= Scullabogue Barn massacre =

Massacre in Ireland during the 1798 rebellion

- Part of the Irish Rebellion of 1798
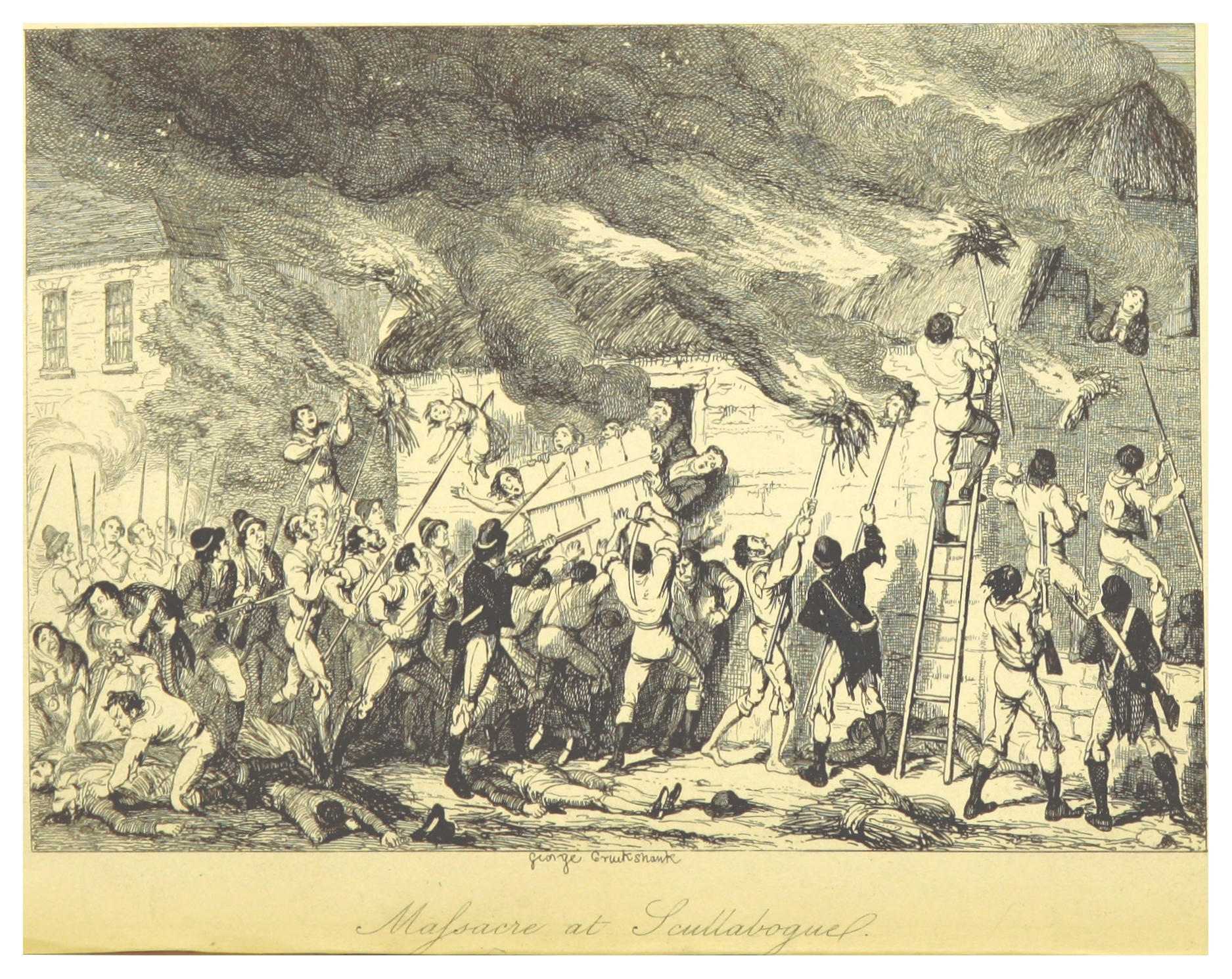
- Massacre at Scullabogue, illustrated by George Cruikshank (1845)

- Scullabogue (island of Ireland)
- Location: 52.359291°N 6.772421°W; Scullabogue, Newbawn, County Wexford, Ireland
- Date: 5 June 1798
- Target: Loyalists
- Attack type: Burning, shooting
- Weapons: Fire, pikes
- Deaths: 100–200
- Injuries: 2
- Perpetrator: United Irishmen rebels

The Scullabogue Barn massacre was a mass murder of loyalist civilians committed in Scullabogue, near Newbawn, County Wexford, Ireland on 5 June 1798, during the 1798 rebellion. A guarding party of United Irishmen rebels massacred up to 200 noncombatant men, women and children, most of whom were Protestant (there were also about 20 Catholics), who were held prisoner in a barn which was then set alight. The massacre was a reaction to reports of atrocities committed by British government forces during the Battle of New Ross. Those killed were prisoners loyal to the British crown and it is the only instance during the rebellion where the rebels killed women and children. A participant in the rebellion, General Thomas Cloney, put the death count at 100.

== Background ==
A farm and outbuildings in the townland of Scullabogue (also spelt Scullaboge; Irish: Scolbóg) were used as a staging post for rebel forces before the 1798 Battle of New Ross. The main camp for the United Irishmen rebels was located a mile from Scullabogue on top of Carrigbyrne Hill. The rebels had rounded perceived loyalists of both sexes and all ages who were mainly held in a barn to prevent their supplying the military with intelligence of rebel movements. At dawn on 5 June, the bulk of the rebel army attacked the nearby town of New Ross leaving behind a small number of guards in charge of the captives. The battle at New Ross was a heavy defeat for the rebels who lost almost 3,000 men. Survivors who had fled the fighting had reached Scullabogue with news of the terrible losses while the battle still raged.

== Massacre ==
Thomas Cloney, a rebel commander with the rank of General, present at the Battle of New Ross, reported:

The wretches who burned Scullabogue Barn did not at least profane the sacred name of justice by alleging that they were offering her a propitiatory sacrifice. The highly criminal and atrocious immolation of the victims at Scullabogue was, by no means, premeditated by the guard left in charge of the prisoners; it was excited and promoted by the cowardly ruffians who ran away from the Ross battle, and conveyed the intelligence (which was too true) that several wounded men had been burned in a house in Ross by the military.

The news had incensed certain elements of the rebel force stationed at Scullabogue, who joined with the deserters in agitating for revenge against the prisoners. The prisoners' guards twice prevented the gathering mob from harming them but eventually gave in to the crowd by allowing the executions by musket-shot of over a dozen particularly hated individuals. However, all semblance of control was quickly lost and the barn was soon torched. People trying to escape the barn were shot, stabbed and beaten to death or forced back into the flames.

Only two men are thought to have escaped the flames of Scullabogue Barn. One was named Richard Grandy, and the other was Loftus Frizzel. At least twelve, and possibly thirteen men alleged to have taken part in the massacre were executed after the rebellion was suppressed; a further two were transported. Although the massacre has been presented in some sources as sectarian in origin, up to 20 of the victims were loyalist Catholics, and three of the seventeen rebel guards linked directly with the massacre by subsequent depositions (John Ellard, John Turner and Robert Mills) were Protestants. Mills gave detailed evidence on the activities of the other guards, and was set free despite having admitted personally attacking prisoners with his pike.

== Memorials ==
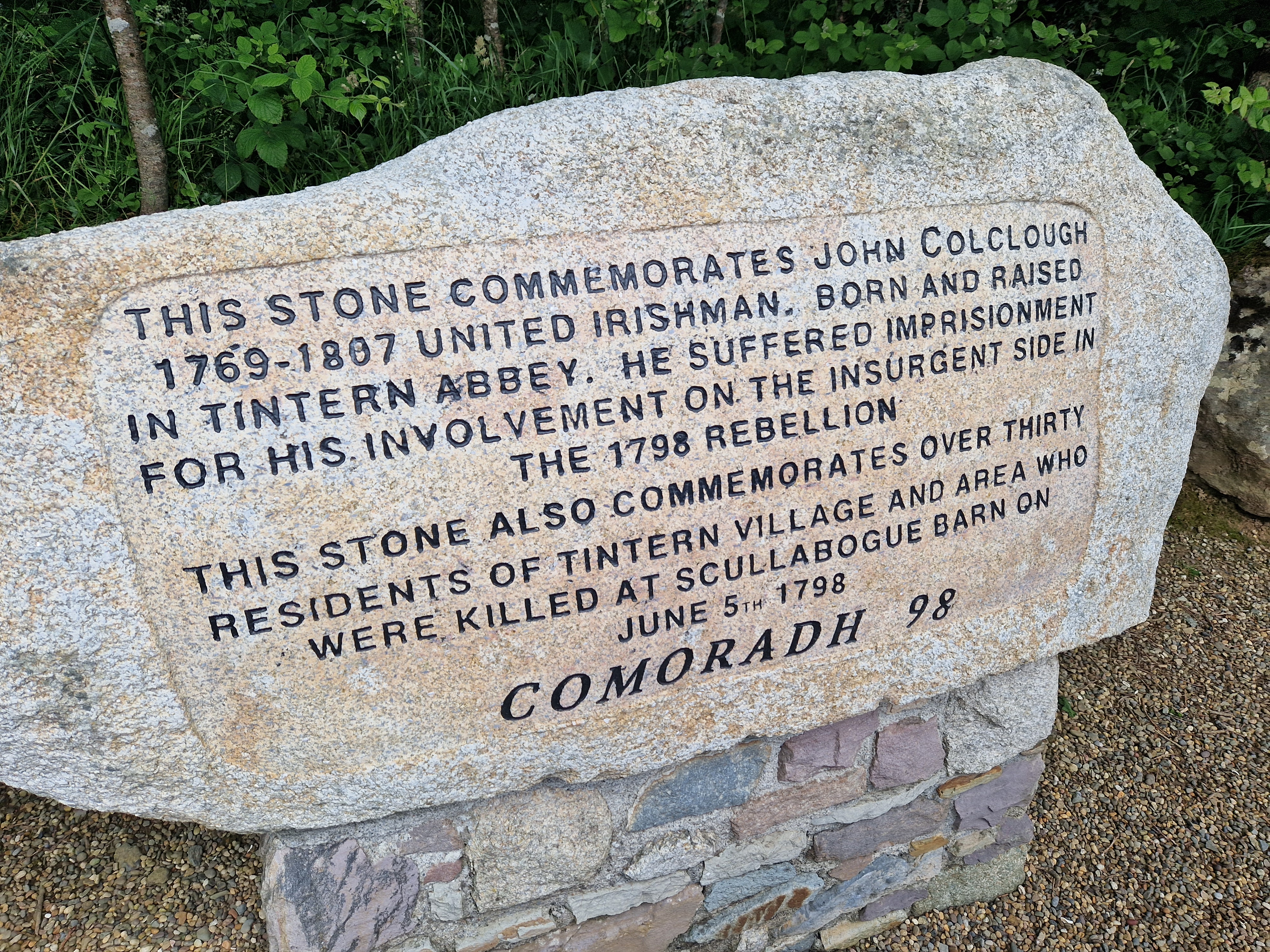
Memorial stone in Tintern Abbey, County Wexford, commemorating the 30+ local people who were among those murdered at Scullabogue.

There is a Scullabogue Memorial stone in the graveyard of Old Ross Church of Ireland church. The theme is one of reconciliation.

== See also ==
- List of massacres in Ireland
- Gibbet Rath executions
- Dunlavin Green executions
- Carnew executions
