= General Dundas =

General Dundas may refer to:

- David Dundas (British Army officer) (1735–1820), British Army general
- Francis Dundas (c. 1759–1824), British Army general
- Henry Dundas, 3rd Viscount Melville (1801–1876), British Army general
- Ralph Dundas (1730–1814), British Army general
- Robert Lawrence Dundas (1780–1844), British Army lieutenant general
- Thomas Dundas (British Army officer) (1750–1794), British Army major general
