= Battle of Newtownmountkennedy =

- Part of the United Irishmen Rebellion
Date	30 May 1798
Location	Newtownmountkennedy, County Wicklow
Result	British victory

Belligerents
United Irishmen	Great Britain

Commanders and leaders
James Doyle Thomas Maguire	Captain Burganey †

Strength
~ 500-1,000	~ 140

Casualties and losses
~ 170	10 killed, more wounded

The Battle of Newtownmountkennedy was fought on 30 May 1798, between forces of the British Crown and a force of Irish Rebels, during the Irish Rebellion of 1798.

The town was base for the Ancient Britons, a British regiment widely reviled in the area for brutality. A rebel force planned an attack from three sides on the town, with each division to be led by Thomas Maguire, James Doyle and Joseph Holt.

Rebel groups were spotted organising and congregating outside the town giving the garrison time to prepare defences. Also, poor co-ordination and an attack on Holts forces near Roundwood meant that only Doyles force commenced the attack.

The attack began after midday with the rebels easily overcoming the outer defences and breaking through to the centre of the town. The main target of the rebels, the barracks, was strongly defended and despite setting fire to the empty military stables to create a smokescreen. The military in response set fire to some cottages to screen a counter-attack which forced the rebels to withdraw, the eventual arrival of Maguires forces meaning the rebels could carry out an orderly withdrawal.

Ten of the garrison, including its commander were killed and more wounded. Approximately 170 Irish rebel forces were killed in the fighting and subsequent mopping up, followed by an execution of the Rebels’ leader, Michael Neil.

== Sources ==
- Musgrave, Richard. Memoirs of the Different Rebellions in Ireland. Third edition. Dublin, 1802.
