= Carnew executions =

1798 execution of alleged United Irishmen by British soldiers in Carnew, Ireland

- Location: Carnew, County Wicklow
- Date: 25 May 1798
- Attack type: Firing squad
- Deaths: 28
- Perpetrator: Irish Yeomanry

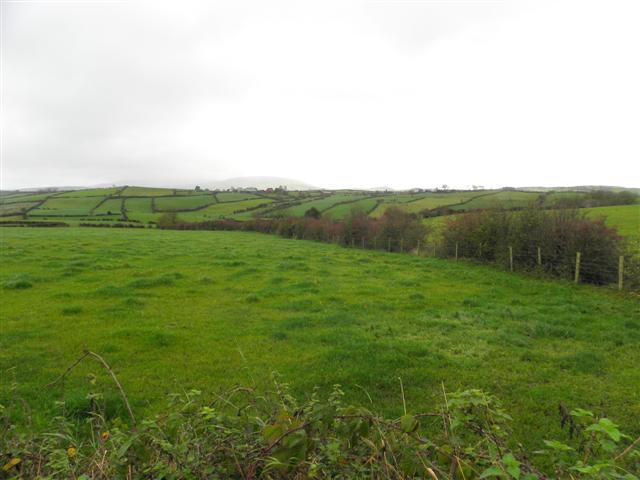
Carnew Townland

The Carnew executions refer to the summary execution of 28 prisoners being held as suspected United Irishmen by yeomanry troops from the Carnew garrison stationed in the barracks of Carnew Castle, County Wicklow, Ireland on 25 May 1798.

== Background ==
The Society of United Irishmen having failed to advance its aims of Catholic emancipation and parliamentary reform by political means, instigated a rebellion against British rule in Ireland. The rebellion took place in May 1798, but the only significant uprisings outside of the province of Ulster occurred in counties Wicklow and Wexford, both south of County Dublin. The rebels were met with a swift response from the Dublin Castle administration and the bulk of the rebellion was suppressed within a year.

== Executions ==
By the morning of the 25 May, news of the long-expected outbreak of the 1798 rebellion in neighbouring County Kildare and of military losses in the battles of Ballymore-Eustace, Naas, and Prosperous had reached the garrison in Carnew, who decided to take preventative measures by assembling the rebel suspects in detention. The suspects were marched from Carnew Castle to the local handball alley and executed by firing squad (consisting of yeomanry soldiers) as a warning to the local populace.

== See also ==
- Dunlavin Green executions
- Gibbet Rath executions
