= Irish Rebellion of 1798 =

Part of the French Revolutionary Wars

- Part of the Atlantic Revolutions and the French Revolutionary Wars
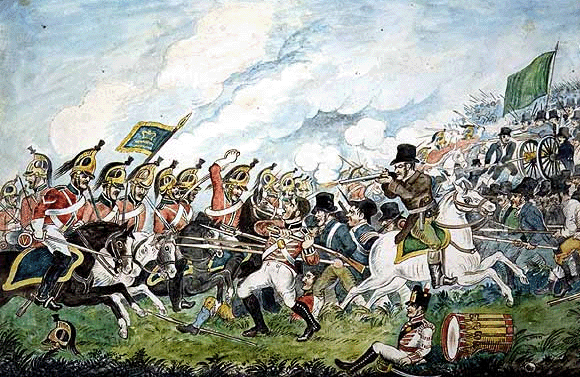
- Battle of Vinegar Hill by William Sadler Kelvin II (1880) "Charge of the 5th Dragoon Guards on the insurgents – a recreant yeoman having deserted to them in uniform is being cut down"
Date	24 May – 12 October 1798 (4 months, 2 weeks, and 4 days)
Location	Ireland
Result	British victory

Belligerents
Irish Republic: United Irishmen; Defenders; (French First Republic) French Republic	Kingdom of Great Britain: Kingdom of Ireland

Commanders and leaders
William Aylmer; Myles Byrne; Thomas Cloney; Lord Edward Fitzgerald (DOW); Edward Fitzgerald (insurgent); James Hope; John Orr; William Byrne (executed); Anthony Perry (executed); Joseph Holt; Bartholomew Teeling (executed); Bagenal Harvey (executed); Henry McCracken (executed); Theobald Tone †; Henry Munro (executed); John Murphy (executed); Michael Murphy †; Philip Roche (executed); Mogue Kearns (executed); (French First Republic) Jean Humbert (surrendered) (French First Republic) Jean Bompart (surrendered)	(Kingdom of Great Britain) Charles Cornwallis (Kingdom of Great Britain) Ralph Abercromby (Kingdom of Great Britain) Gerard Lake (Kingdom of Great Britain) George Nugent (Kingdom of Great Britain) John Warren

Strength
50,000 United Irishmen; 4,100 French regulars 10 French Navy ships	30,000 British regulars ~25,000 yeomanry ~1,000 Hessians; 40,000 Irish loyalists

Casualties and losses
10,000–50,000 estimated combatant and civilian deaths 3,500 French captured 7 French ships captured	500–2,000 military deaths c. 1,000 loyalist civilian deaths

The Irish Rebellion of 1798 (Irish: Éirí Amach 1798; Ulster Scots: "The Turn Out"/"The Hurries") was a popular insurrection against the British Crown in what was then the separate, but subordinate, Kingdom of Ireland. The main organising force was the Society of United Irishmen. First formed in Belfast by Presbyterians opposed to the landed Anglican establishment, the Society, despairing of reform, sought to secure a republic through a revolutionary union with the country's Catholic majority. The grievances of a rack-rented tenantry, and of market-town traders, journeymen and weavers drove recruitment.

While assistance was being sought from the French Republic and from democratic militants in Britain, martial-law seizures and arrests forced the conspirators into the open. Beginning in late May 1798, there were a series of uncoordinated risings: in the counties of Carlow and Wexford in the southeast where the rebels met with some success; in the north around Belfast in counties Antrim and Down; and closer to the capital, Dublin, in counties Meath and Kildare.

In late August, after the rebels had been reduced to pockets of guerrilla resistance, the French landed an expeditionary force in the west, in County Mayo. Unable to effect a conjunction with a significant rebel force, they surrendered on 9 September. In the last open-field engagement of the rebellion, the local men they had rallied on their arrival were routed at Killala on 23 September. On 12 October, a second French expedition was defeated in a naval action off the coast of County Donegal leading to the capture of the United Irish leader Wolfe Tone.

In the wake of the rebellion, Acts of Union 1800 abolished the Irish legislature and brought Ireland under the crown of a United Kingdom through the Parliament at Westminster. The centenary of the rebellion in 1898 saw its legacy disputed by nationalists who wished to restore a legislature in Dublin, by republicans who invoked the name of Tone in the cause of complete separation and independence, and by unionists opposed to all measures of Irish self-government. Renewed in a bicentenary year that coincided with the Good Friday Agreement in 1998, the debate over the interpretation and significance of 1798 continues.

== Background ==
=== The Volunteer movement ===
In the last decades of the 18th century, the British Crown in Ireland faced growing demands for constitutional reform. The Protestant Ascendancy had relaxed the Penal Laws by which, in the wake of the Jacobite defeat in 1691, it had sought to break the power, and reduce the influence, both of the Catholic church and of the remaining Catholic gentry. However, the landed Anglican interest continued to monopolise the Irish Parliament, occupying both the House of Lords and, through the system of pocket boroughs, half of the Commons. The interests of the Crown were meanwhile secured by a Viceregal administration accountable, not to the legislature in Dublin, but to the King and his ministers in London (and which also having boroughs in its pocket reduced to a third the number of Commons seats open to electoral contest). Additionally, the British parliament presumed the right to itself to legislate for Ireland, a prerogative it had exercised to restrict rival Irish trade and commerce.

The revolt of the North American colonies presented a challenge. War with the colonists and with their French allies drew down the Crown's regular forces in Ireland. In their absence Volunteer companies were formed, ostensibly for home defence, but were soon, like their kinsmen in the colonies, debating and asserting "constitutional rights". In 1782, with the Volunteers drilling and parading in support of the otherwise beleaguered Patriot opposition in the Irish Parliament, Westminster repealed its Dependency of Ireland on Great Britain Act 1719.

Volunteers, especially in the north where Presbyterians and other Protestant Dissenters had flocked to their ranks, immediately sought to build upon this grant of legislative independence by agitating for the abolition of the pocket boroughs and an extension of the franchise but the question of whether, and on what terms, parliamentary reform should embrace Catholic emancipation split the movement. The Ancien Régime survived: the Anglican aristocracy remained entrenched under the patronage of a government that continued to take its direction from London.

=== Formation of the United Irishmen ===
The disappointment was felt keenly in Belfast, a growing commercial centre which, as a borough owned of the Marquess of Donegall, had no elected representation. In October 1791, amidst public celebration of the French Revolution, a group of Volunteer veterans invited an address from Wolfe Tone, a Protestant secretary to Dublin's Catholic Committee. Acknowledging his Argument on behalf of the Catholics of Ireland, in which Tone maintained they would not enjoy liberty until banded together with Catholics against the "boobies and blockheads" of the Ascendancy, and styling themselves at his suggestion the Society of United Irishmen, the meeting resolved:

[that] the weight of English influence in the government of this country is so great as to require a cordial union among all the people of Ireland; [and] that the sole constitutional mode by which this influence can be opposed, is by complete and radical reform of the representation of the people in parliament.

The same resolution was carried by Tone's friends in Dublin where, reflecting a larger, more diverse, middle class, the Society united from the outset Protestant, Catholic and Dissenter.

=== The Catholic Convention ===
With the support and participation of United Irishmen, in December 1792 the Catholic Committee convened a national Catholic Convention. Elected on a broad, head-of-household, franchise, the "Back Lane Parliament" was a direct challenge to the legitimacy of the Irish Lords and Commons.

Anticipating war with the new French Republic, George III received a delegation from the convention (including Tone) at Windsor, and the British government pressed the Irish Parliament to match Westminster's Roman Catholic Relief Act 1791. This relieved Catholics of most of their remaining civil disabilities and, where (in the counties) Common's seats were contested, allowed those meeting the property qualification to vote. For Parliament itself the Oath of Supremacy was retained so that it remained exclusively Protestant.

For a measure that could have little appreciable impact on the conduct of government, the price for overriding Ascendancy opposition was the dissolution of the Catholic Committee, a new government militia that conscripted Catholic and Protestant by lot, and a Convention Act that effectively outlawed extra-parliamentary opposition. The government moved to suppress the United Irishmen, who were seeking to revive and remodel the Volunteers along the lines of the revolutionary French National Guard. In May 1794, following the revelation of meetings between a French emissary, William Jackson, and United leaders including Tone and Archibald Hamilton Rowan, the Society was proscribed.

== Mobilisation ==
Provinces of Ireland

=== New System of Organisation ===
A year later, in May 1795, a meeting of United delegates from Belfast and the surrounding market towns responded to the growing repression by endorsing a new, and it was hoped more resistant, "system of organisation". Local societies were to split so as to remain within a range of 7 to 35 members, and through baronial and county delegate committees, to build toward a provincial, and, once three of Ireland's four provinces had organised, a national, directory.

It was with this New System that the Society spread rapidly across Ulster and, eventually, from Dublin (where the abandonment of open proceedings had been resisted) out into the midlands and the south. As it did so, William Drennan's "test" or pledge, calling for "a union of power among Irishmen of every religious persuasion", was administered to artisans, journeymen and shopkeepers, many of whom had maintained their own "Jacobin" clubs, and to tenant farmers and their market-town allies who had organised against the Protestant gentry in secret fraternities.

=== United Irish–Defender alliance ===
In rural Ireland, there was a "varied, energetic and complex structure of agrarian 'secret societies'", commonly referred to as Whiteboyism, after groups that had emerged mid-century in the south. In the north, it had included the Oakboys, Presbyterian led but admitting Catholics, who in 1763 had threatened to pursue fleeing Anglican rectors and tithe proctors into the city of Derry. There had also been the Hearts of Steel: protesting land speculation and evictions, in 1770 they had entered Belfast, besieged the barracks, and sprung one of their number from prison. By the 1790s, borrowing, like the United Irish societies (and, from 1795, their nemesis the Orange Institution), from the lodge structure and ceremonial of freemasonry, this semi-insurrectionary phenomenon had regenerated as the largely but—with some latter-day adjustments to their oaths—not exclusively Catholic, Defenders.

Originating as "fleets" of young men who contended with Protestant Peep o' Day Boys for the control of tenancies and employment in the linen-producing region of north Armagh, the Defenders organised across the southern counties of Ulster and into the Irish midlands. Already in 1788, their oath-taking had been condemned in a pastoral by the Catholic Primate Archbishop of Armagh. As the United Irishmen began to reach out the Defenders, they were similarly sanctioned. With cautions against the "fascinating illusions" of French principles, in 1794 Catholics taking the United test were threatened with excommunication.

Encountering a political outlook more Jacobite than Jacobin, and speaking freely to the grievances of tithes, taxes and rents, United agents sought to convince Defenders of something they had only "vaguely" considered, namely the need to separate Ireland from England and to secure its "real as well as nominal independence". As the promise of reform receded, and as French victories built hopes of military assistance, Catholic emancipation and parliamentary reform became a demand for universal manhood suffrage (every man a citizen), and hopes for accountable government were increasingly represented by the call for an Irish republic—terms that clearly anticipated a violent break with the Crown.

=== Preparation ===
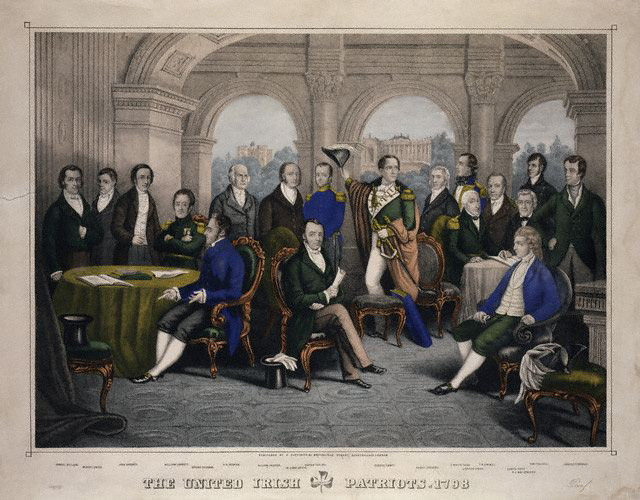
The leadership of the United Irishmen

Beginning with an obligation of each society to drill a company, and of three companies to form a battalion, the New System of Organisation was adapted to military preparation. With only Ulster and Leinster organised, the leadership remained split between the two provincial directories. In June 1797, they met together in Dublin to consider the demands for an immediate rising from the northerners who, reeling from martial-law seizures and arrests, feared the opportunity to strike was passing. The meeting broke up in disarray, with many of the Ulster delegates fleeing abroad. The authorities were sufficiently satisfied with the severity of their countermeasures in Ulster that in August they restored civil law in the province.

The initiative passed to the Leinster directory which had recruited two radically disaffected members of the Patriot opposition: Lord Edward FitzGerald, who brought with him experience of the American war, and Arthur O'Connor (later, undistinguished, as an officer of Napoleon's Irish Legion). In August 1797, their military refinement of the New System retained a measure of democratic practice. Townland societies of 12 men, mustered as platoons, chose their own sergeants; ten sergeants commissioned a company captain, and ten captains—a combined command of 1,200 men—elected a regimental colonel. The directory intervened only at the level the county adjutant-general, the colonels advancing a shortlist of names for their selection. Under this "military constitution", the movement strengthened in existing strongholds such as Dublin, County Kildare and County Meath, and broke new ground in the midlands and the south-east.

In February 1798, a return prepared by Fitzgerald computed the number of United Irishmen, nationwide, at 269,896 but there were doubts as to the number who would heed call to arms and whether they could muster more than simple pikes (over the previous year the authorities had seized 70,630 of these compared to just 4,183 blunderbusses and 225 musket barrels). While the movement had withstood the government's countermeasures, and seditious propaganda and preparation continued, there was hesitation to act without the certainty of French arms and assistance.

== Soliciting French, and British-Jacobin, alliances ==
=== Hoche's expedition December 1796 ===
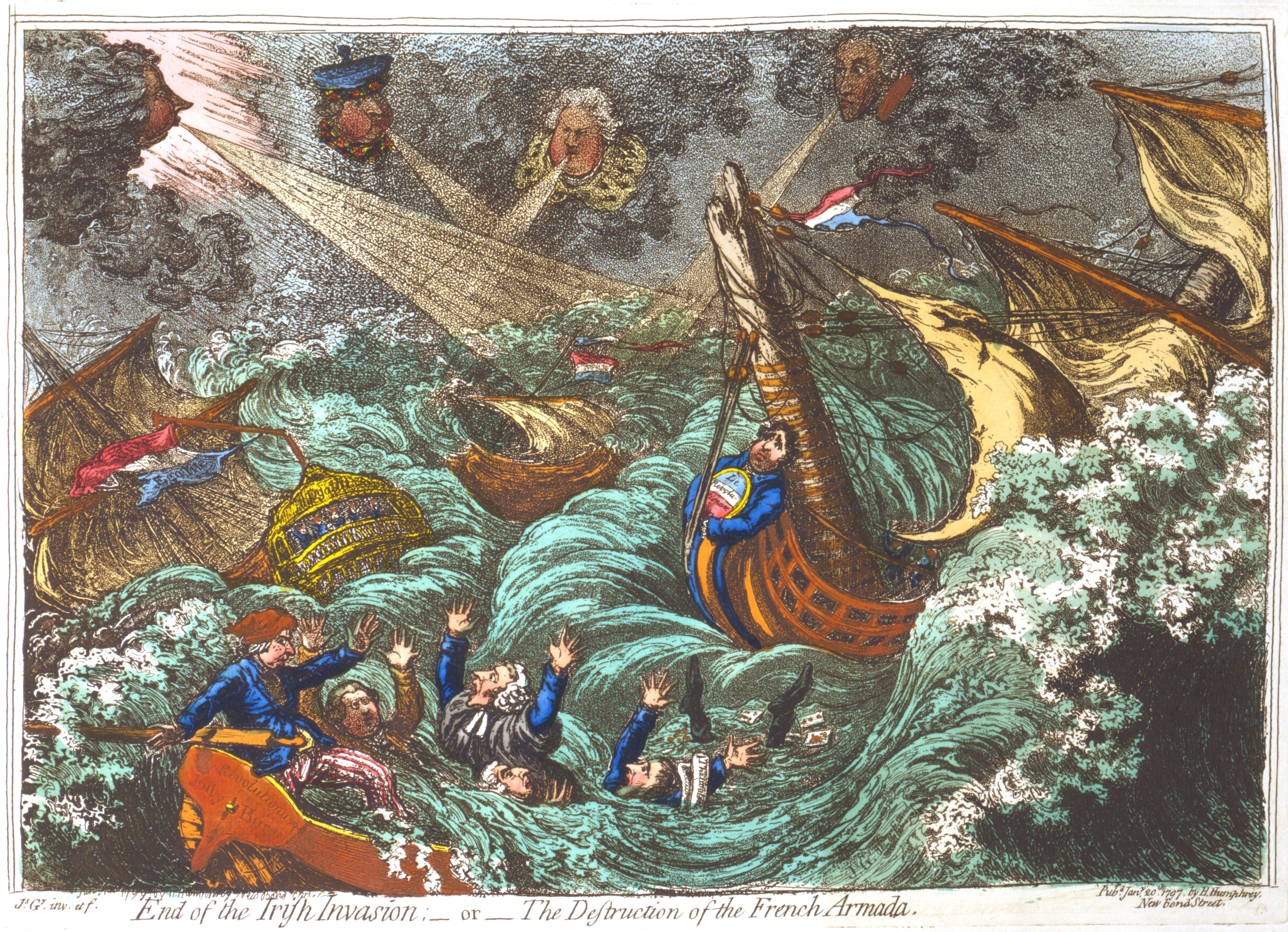
In End of the Irish Invasion–or–the Destruction of the French Armada (1797), James Gillray caricatured the failure of Hoche's expedition.

In 1795, from American exile Tone had travelled to Paris where he sought to convince the French Directory that Ireland was the key to breaking Britain's maritime stranglehold. His "memorials" on the situation in Ireland came to the attention of Director Lazare Carnot, and by May, General Henri Clarke, the Irish-descendant head of the War Ministry's Bureau Topographique, had drafted an invasion plan. In June, Carnot offered General Lazare Hoche command of an Irish expedition that would secure "the safety of France for centuries to come."

Originally, it was to have been accompanied by two diversionary raids on England: one against Newcastle, the other against Bristol. In the event, because of pressing demands in Italy, the forty thousand men called for could not be mustered.

Under Hoche, a force of 15,000 veteran troops was assembled at Brest. Sailing on 16 December, accompanied by Tone, the French arrived off the coast of Ireland at Bantry Bay on 22 December 1796. Unremitting storms prevented a landing. Tone remarked that "England [...] had its luckiest escape since the Armada". The fleet returned home and the army intended to spearhead the invasion of Ireland was split up and sent, along with a growing Irish Legion, to fight in other theatres of the French Revolutionary Wars.

Bantry Bay had nonetheless made real the prospect of French intervention, and United societies flooded with new members. There were increasing reports of Defenders and United Irishmen "marauding" for weapons, and openly parading. In May 1797, Yeomanry, which in the north had begun recruiting entire Orange lodges, charged gatherings near Cootehill in Cavan killing eleven, and in Dundalk killing fourteen.

=== Naval mutinies ===
In advance of Hoche's expedition, Tone told Carnot that there were 80,000 Irishmen in the Royal Navy and prepared an address calling on them to steer their ships into the ports of Ireland, "now an independent nation". When, months later in April and May 1797, mutinies broke out at Spithead and Nore, the British authorities (who estimated the actual number of Irish in the fleet as 11,000, or 11 percent of the total) were quick to see the hand of the United Irish and their radical allies .

The Irish republicans were reportedly behind the resolution of the Nore mutineers to hand the fleet over to the French "as the only government that understands the Rights of Man". Much was made of Valentine Joyce, a leader at Spithead, described by Edmund Burke as a "seditious Belfast clubist". Yet no evidence was brought forth of United Irish sympathisers aboard ship being directed by agents of the Society. It was only after the mutinies that leaders in Ireland began to address compatriots in the fleet, and it was in terms, replicating Tone's purely patriotic appeal, that displayed no interest in, or understanding of, their on-board predicament and grievances.

The mutinies had paralysed the British navy, but the Batavian fleet that the French had prepared for their forces at Texel was again opposed by the weather. In October 1797, after Tone and the troops he was to accompany to Ireland had been disembarked, the fleet sought to reach the French naval base at Brest and was destroyed by the Royal Navy at the Battle of Camperdown.

=== The First Consul ===
In Paris, Tone recognised the rising star of Napoleon Bonaparte but he found the conqueror of Italy incurious about the Irish situation being in need of a war of conquest, not of liberation, to pay his army. In February 1798, British spies did report that the First Consul was preparing a fleet in the Channel ports ready for the embarkation of up to 50,000 men, but the preparations were soon reversed. Bonaparte deemed both the military and naval forces assembled inadequate to the task.

In later exile, the dethroned emperor was to claim that he might have made an attempt on Ireland (instead of sailing in May 1798 for Egypt) had he had confidence in Tone and the other United Irish agents appearing in Paris. He describes them as divided in opinion and constantly quarrelling.

=== British co-conspiracy ===
These agents from Ireland included James Coigly. A Catholic priest who had been active in bringing Defenders into the movement in Ulster, Coigly sought to persuade both French Directory and the leadership in Ireland of a larger project. Beginning in 1796, United Irish agents had helped build networks of United Englishmen and United Scotsmen, societies whose proceedings, oath-taking, and advocacy of physical force "mirrored that of their Irish inspirators". Describing himself as an emissary of the United Irish executive, assisted by a tide of refugees from Ulster, and tapping into protest against the Combination Acts and wartime food shortages, Coigly worked from Manchester to spread the United system across the manufacturing districts of northern England. In London, he conferred with Irishmen prominent in the city's federation of democratic clubs, the London Corresponding Society. With these he drew together delegates from Scotland and the provinces who, as "United Britons", resolved "to overthrow the present Government, and to join the French as soon as they made a landing in England".

In July 1797, the resolution of the United Britons was discussed by the leadership in Dublin and Belfast. Although addressed to the prospect of a French invasion, the suggestion that "England, Scotland and Ireland are all one people acting for one common cause", encouraged militants to believe that liberty could be won even if "the French should never come here".

== The risings ==
=== Eve-of-rebellion arrests ===
In early 1798, a series of violent attacks on magistrates in County Tipperary, County Kildare and King's County alarmed the authorities. They were also aware that there was now a faction of the United Irish leadership, led by Fitzgerald and O'Connor, who felt "sufficiently well organised and equipped" to begin an insurgency without French assistance. The Viceroy, Lord Camden, came under increasing pressure from hardline Irish MPs, led by Speaker John Foster, to crack down on the growing disorder in the south and midlands and arrest the Dublin leadership.

Camden hesitated, partly as he feared a crackdown would itself provoke an insurrection: the British Home Secretary Lord Portland agreed, describing the proposals as "dangerous and inconvenient". The situation changed when an informer, Thomas Reynolds, produced Fitzgerald's report on manpower with its suggestion that over a quarter of a million men across Ulster, Leinster and Munster were preparing to join the "revolutionary army". The Irish government learned from Reynolds that a meeting of the Leinster Provincial Committee and Directory had been set for 10 March in the Dublin house of wool merchant Oliver Bond, where a motion for an immediate rising would be tabled. Camden decided to act, explaining to London that he risked having the Irish Parliament turn against him.

On the 10th, In March 1798, almost the entire committee were seized, along with two directors, the comparative moderates (those who, in the absence of the French, had counselled delay) William James MacNeven and Thomas Addis Emmet, together with all their papers. Meanwhile, in England, O'Connor had been arrested alongside Coigly. Having been found in possession of a further address to the French Directory, Coigly was hanged, and the United network he had helped build in Britain was broken up by internment. In Dublin, Fitzgerald went into hiding.

The Irish government imposed martial law on 30 March, although civil courts continued sitting. Overall command of the army was transferred from Ralph Abercromby to Gerard Lake who turned his attention to Leinster and Munster where from Ulster his troops' reputation for public floggings, half-hanging, pitch-capping and other interrogative refinements preceded him.

=== The Call from Dublin ===
Faced with the breaking-up of their entire system, Fitzgerald, joined by Samuel Neilson (publisher in Belfast of the Society paper Northern Star, recently released from Kilmainham Prison), and by John and Henry Sheares, resolved on a general uprising for 23 May. There was no immediate promise of assistance from France (on the 19th a French expeditionary force had set sail, under Napoleon, but for Egypt, not Ireland). The United army in Dublin was to seize strategic points in the city, while the armies in the surrounding counties would throw up a cordon and advance into its centre. As soon as these developments were signalled by halting mail coaches from the capital, the rest of the country was to rise.

On the appointed day, the rising in the city was aborted. Fitzgerald had been mortally wounded on the 19th, the Sheares brothers were betrayed the 21st, and on the morning of the 23rd, Neilson, who had been critical to the planning, was seized. Armed with last minute intelligence, a large force of military occupied the rebels' intended assembly points, persuading those who had turned out to dump weapons and disperse. The plan to intercept the mail coaches miscarried, with only the Munster-bound coach halted at Johnstown, County Kildare, near Naas. The organisation in the outer districts of the city nonetheless rose as planned and were swiftly followed by the surrounding counties.

=== Leinster ===
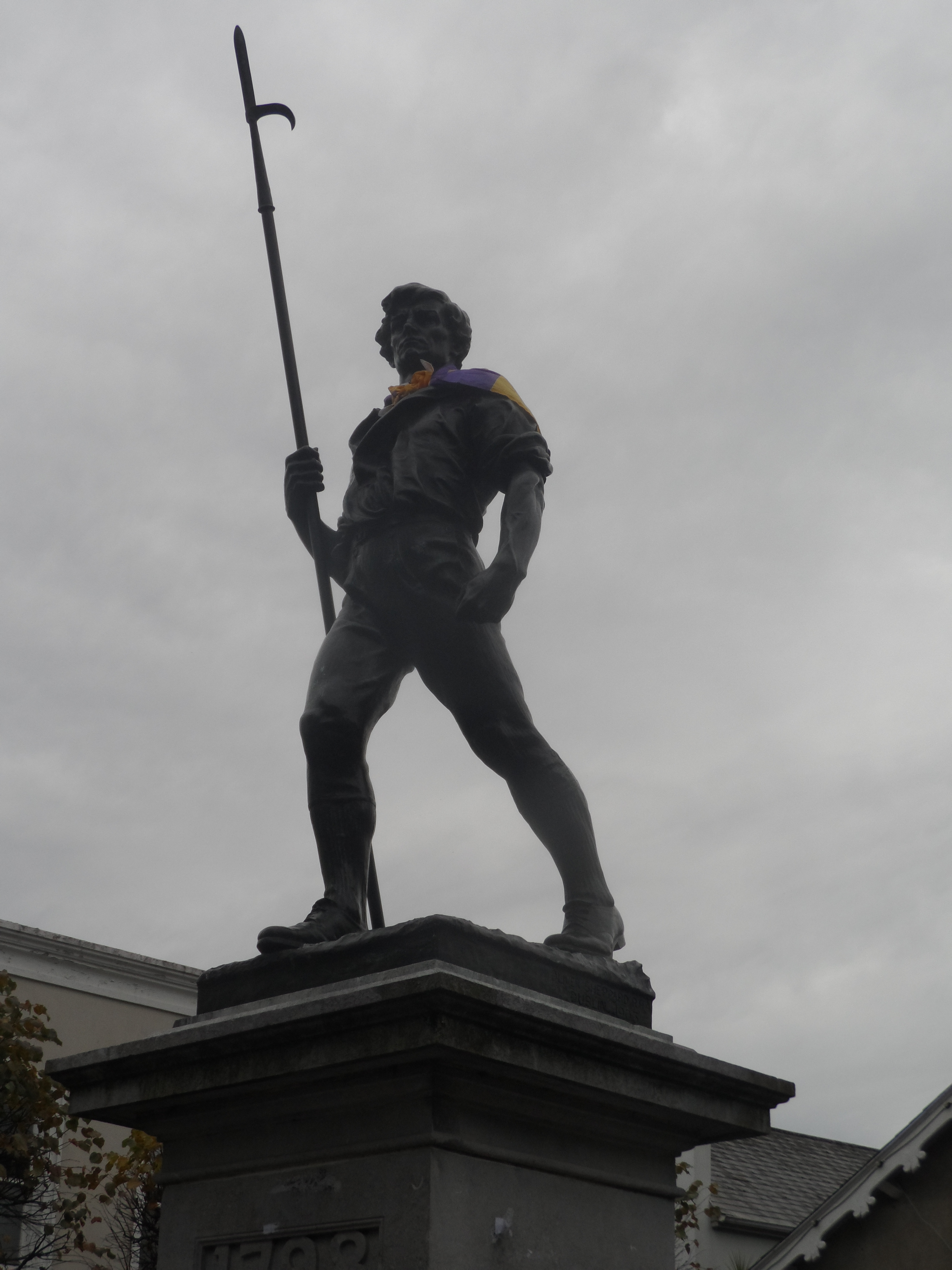
"Pikeman" statue in Wexford Town

The first clashes of the rebellion took place just after dawn on 24 May in County Kildare. After the Munster mail coach was attacked on its approach to Naas on the night of the 23rd, as 1,000 to 3,000 men approached the town. Their pikes could not prevail against grapeshot and steady musket fire. A garrison of less than 200 routed the rebels, with a small cavalry detachment cutting down over a hundred as they fled.

Success did attend a smaller rebel force, commanded by John Esmonde, a Protestant physician who had deserted from the Yeomanry, later that day at Prosperous. The town was not to be re-occupied until after a rebel defeat at Ovidstown on 19 June, but a succession of rebel reversals further afield, including defeats at Carlow (25 May) and of a larger host at the Hill of Tara in County Meath (May 26) persuaded many of the Kildare insurgents that their cause was lost.

Rebels were to remain longest in the field in south-east, in Wexford and in the Mountains of Wicklow. It is commonly suggested that the trigger for the rising in Wexford was the arrival on 26 May of the notorious North Cork Militia. On 27 May, underestimating the hill-top position and resolve of a rebel party hastily assembled under a local priest, John Murphy (who only months before had led his congregation in taking an oath of loyalty to the King) a force of the militia and yeomanry was cut down outside the town of Oulart. The insurgents then swept south through Wexford Town where they released, and gave command to, the local United Irish leader, a Protestant barrister, Bagenal Harvey.

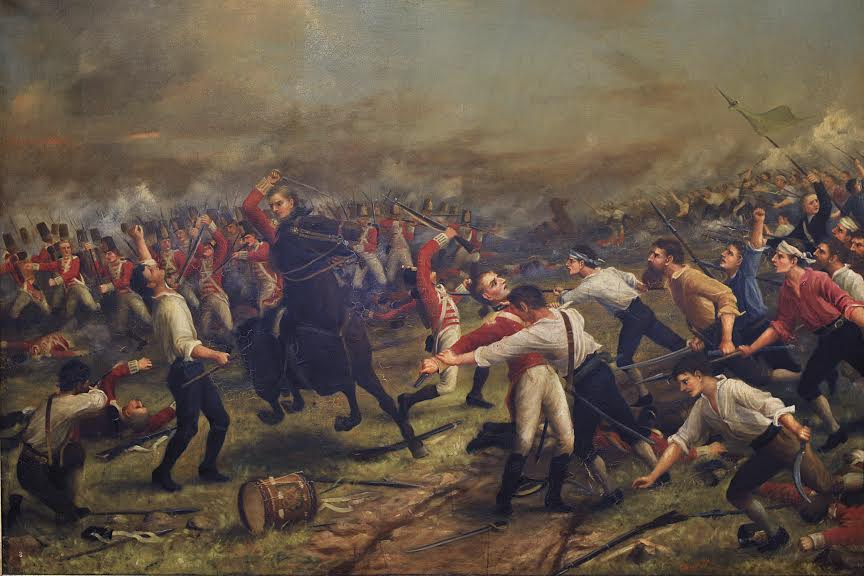
United Irishmen charge at Oulart Hill, 27 May 1798

On 5 June, Bagenel, leading a force of 3,000, failed in an attempt to storm New Ross whose capture might have opened the way to the large bodies of Defenders known to exist in Kilkenny and Waterford. During and after the battle, government forces systematically killed captured and wounded rebels. On news of the defeat, rebels in the rear killed up to 200 loyalist prisoners (men, women and children): the notorious Scullabogue Barn massacre.

Meanwhile, attempts to break northward and open a road through Wicklow toward Dublin were checked 1 June at Bunclody and, despite the deployment of guns captured by Murphy's division in an ambush at Tubberneering, at Arklow on 9 June. The rebels fell back toward the south, meeting the survivors of New Ross and forming a camp of 16,000 on Vinegar Hill outside the town of Enniscorthy. There, on 21 June, they were surrounded, bombarded and routed by a force of 13,000 under General Lake.

The rebel flag at Arklow, 9 June 1798

The remnants of the "Republic of Wexford" established a base in Killaughrim Woods, in the north of the county, under James Corcoran. Others sought action elsewhere. On 24 June, 8,000 men converged in two columns led by Father Murphy and by Myles Byrne on Castlecomer in County Kilkenny where it was hoped the area's militant colliers would join them. Unprepared, the miners did not tip the balance and at the end of the day both garrison and rebels retreated from the burning town. Byrne led his men into the Wicklow Mountains where Joseph Holt and Michael Dwyer commanded a guerrilla resistance. On 28 June, after being routed on Kilcomney Hill near Goresbridge, Murphy's men passed into Kildare. There, after the priest was captured, they joined rebels withdrawn under William Aylmer into the Bog of Allen. After a number of bruising engagements, the "Wexford croppies" moved into Meath making a last stand at Knightstown bog on 14 July. A few hundred survivors returned to Kildare where at Sallins they surrendered on the 21st.

All but their leaders benefited from an amnesty intended by the new Lord Lieutenant, Charles Cornwallis to flush out remaining resistance. The law was pushed through the Irish Parliament by the Chancellor, Lord Clare. A staunch defender of the Ascendancy, Clare was determined to separate Catholics from the greater enemy, "Godless Jacobinism."

=== Ulster ===
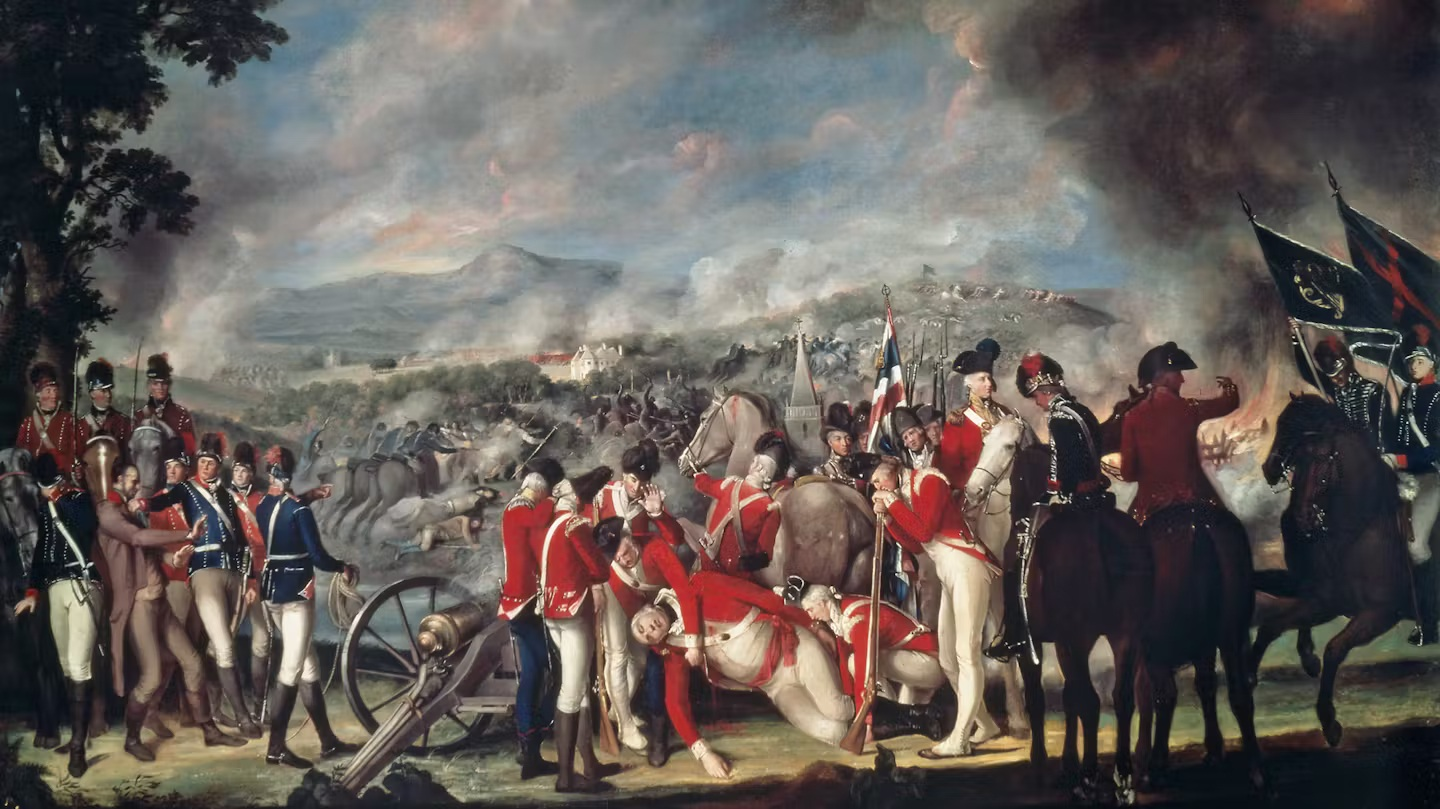
Battle of Ballynahinch, 12–13 June 1798

In the north, there had been no response to the call from Dublin. On 29 May, following news of the fighting in Leinster, county delegates meeting in Armagh, voted out the hesitant Ulster directory and resolved that if the adjutant generals of Antrim and Down could not agree a general plan of insurrection, they would return to their occupations and "deceive the people no more". In response, Robert Simms, who refused to consider action in the absence of the French, resigned his command in Antrim. Amidst charges of betrayal by aristocrats, cowards and traitors, his colonels turned to the young Henry Joy McCracken. Fearful that the "hope of a union with the south" was otherwise lost, McCracken proclaimed the First Year of Liberty on 6 June.

On 7 June, there were local musters across the county, and west of the Bann at Maghera. The green flag was raised in Ballymena, and there were attacks on Larne, Glenarm, Carrickfergus, Toomebridge and Ballymoney. But by the following morning, before any coordination had been possible, those who turned out had begun to dump arms and disperse on news of McCracken defeat. Leading a body of four to six thousand, their commander had failed, with heavy losses, to seize Antrim Town.

From the point of view of the military, the insurrection in County Antrim ended on 9 June with the surrender of Ballymena (under an amnesty that spared it the fate of Randalstown, Templepatrick and Ballymoney—all set ablaze). A diminishing band under McCracken dispersed when, on the 14th, they received news of the decisive defeat of the Army of the Republic in County Down.

Plans for a simultaneous rising in Down on the 7th had been disrupted by the arrest of the county's adjutant general, William Steele Dickson, and all his colonels. But beginning on the 9th younger officers took the initiative. An ambush outside Saintfield, an attack upon Newtownards, and the seizure of guns from a ship in Bangor harbour, persuaded General Nugent to concentrate his forces for a counteroffensive in Belfast. The republic in north Down, which extended down the Ards peninsula to Portaferry from which the rebels, under naval fire, were repulsed on the 11th, lasted but three days. Nugent moved on the 12th, and by the morning of the 13th had routed the main rebel conjunction under Dickson's successor, a young Lisburn draper, Henry Monro, outside Ballynahinch.

Stories of Catholic desertion at the Battle of Ballynahinch were common, although a more sympathetic account has Defenders decamping only after Munro rejected their proposal for a night attack on the riotous soldiery in the town as taking an "ungenerous advantage". These were denied by James Hope who had been one of the principal United emissaries to the Defenders. He insisted that Defenders had not appeared among the rebels in separate ranks, and that the body that deserted Munro on the eve of battle had been "the Killinchy people ... and they were Dissenters".

Historian Marianne Elliott notes that, in Down, Catholics had a formal parity in the United organisation. Prior to the final arrests, they accounted for three of the county's six colonels. As they dominated only in the southern third of the county this, she suggests, did not reflect a practice of separate Catholic divisions.

=== Munster ===
In the southwest, in Munster, there were just two confrontations in the field: on 19 June near Clonakilty in West Cork, the Battle of the Big Cross and, after the principal action was over, on 23 July, at Carrickmoclear hill, an outcrop of Slievenamon near Ninemilehouse in County Tipperary, where an informant led 600 men into trap set by the yeomanry. The province had been subject to pacification ten years before: a martial-law regime suppressed a semi-insurrectionary Rightboy agrarian resistance movement. Following the French appearance off Bantry in December 1796, the exercise was repeated. With a license to "treat the people with as much harshness as possible", troops of the line, militia, yeomanry and fencibles, were garrisoned across the region recovering arms, arresting large numbers of United suspects, and dragooning young men into militia service.

In May 1797, the entire committee of the relatively strong United organisation that the Sheares brothers had built in Cork City were arrested. In April 1798, the authorities broke up what remained.

The confrontation on 19 June was between a column of Westmeath Militia and a force of 300–400 lightly armed local peasantry, who, according to one account, appealed to the militia men to join their party and were instead met with fire. The Clonakilty Catholics were afterwards admonished in their chapel by the town's Protestant vicar for being so "foolish" as "to think that ... country farmers and labourers [could] set up as politicians, reformers, and law makers".

== French epilogue ==
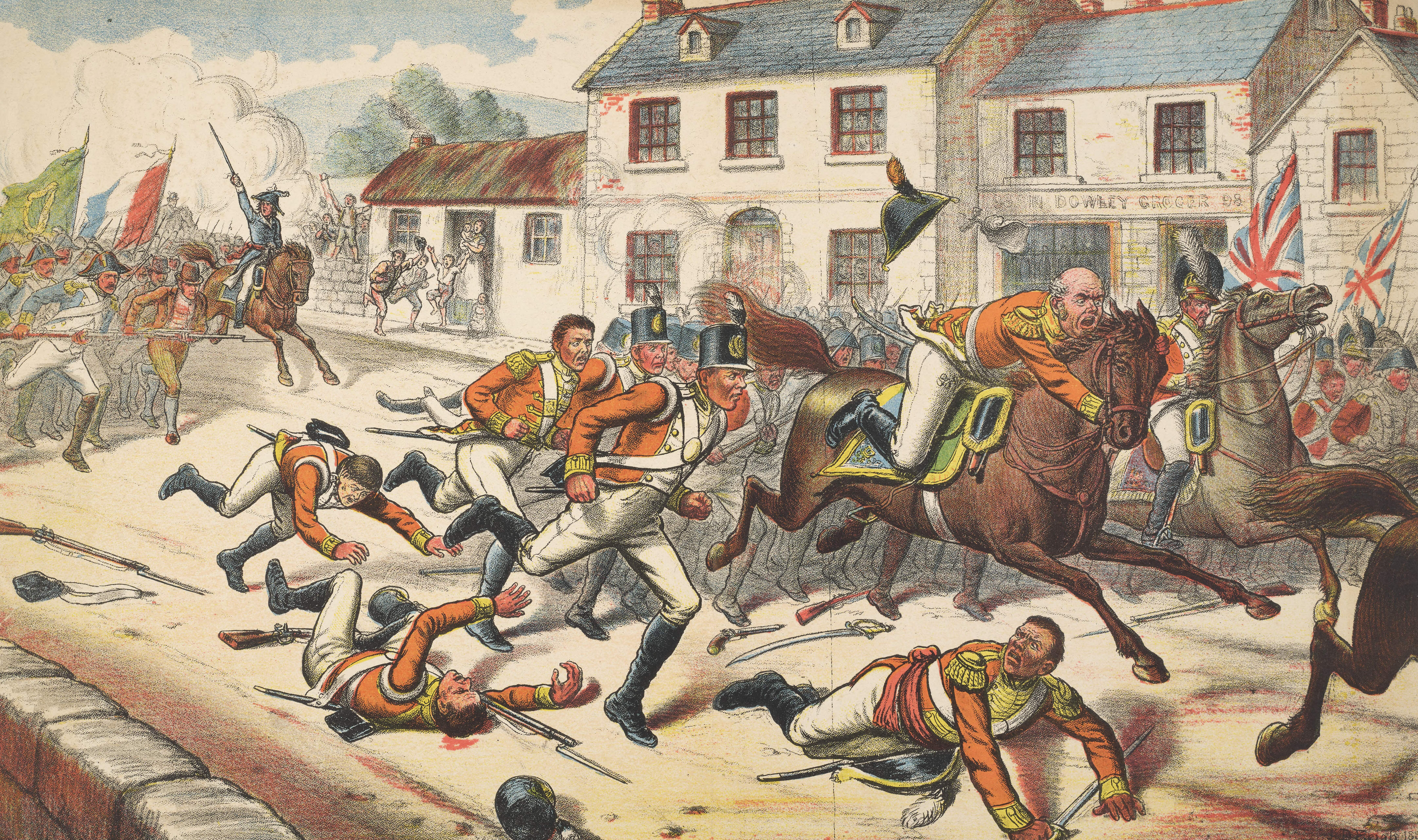
"Races of Castlebar", 27 August

Connacht, in the far west, the poorest of the Irish provinces, was drawn into the rebellion only by the arrival on 22 August of the French. About 1,000 French soldiers under General Humbert landed at Kilcummin, County Mayo. Joined by up to 5,000 hastily assembled "uncombed, ragged" and shoeless peasants, they had some initial success. In what would later become known as the "Races of Castlebar" they set to flight a militia force of 6,000 under Lake.

In the wake of the victory, Humbert proclaimed the Irish Republic with the French-educated John Moore as president of the government of Connacht. But the French commander was unable to make timely contact with new risings sparked in counties Longford, Meath and Cavan (where on 27 August, on the shore of the Castle Lake outside Bailieborough some 300 United men were bayoneted or drowned). After a token engagement with British forces of some 26,000 at Ballinamuck, in County Longford, Humbert surrendered on 8 September, along with 500 Irish under Bartholomew Teeling.

What was recalled in the Irish-speaking region as Bliain na bhFrancach (the year of the French), concluded with slaughter of some 2000 poorly-armed insurgents outside Killala on the 23rd. They had been led by a scion of Mayo's surviving Catholic gentry, James Joseph MacDonnell. Terror ensued with Mayo's High Sheriff, Denis Browne (the future Marquess of Sligo) earning the nickname Donnchadh an Rópa (Denis the Rope).

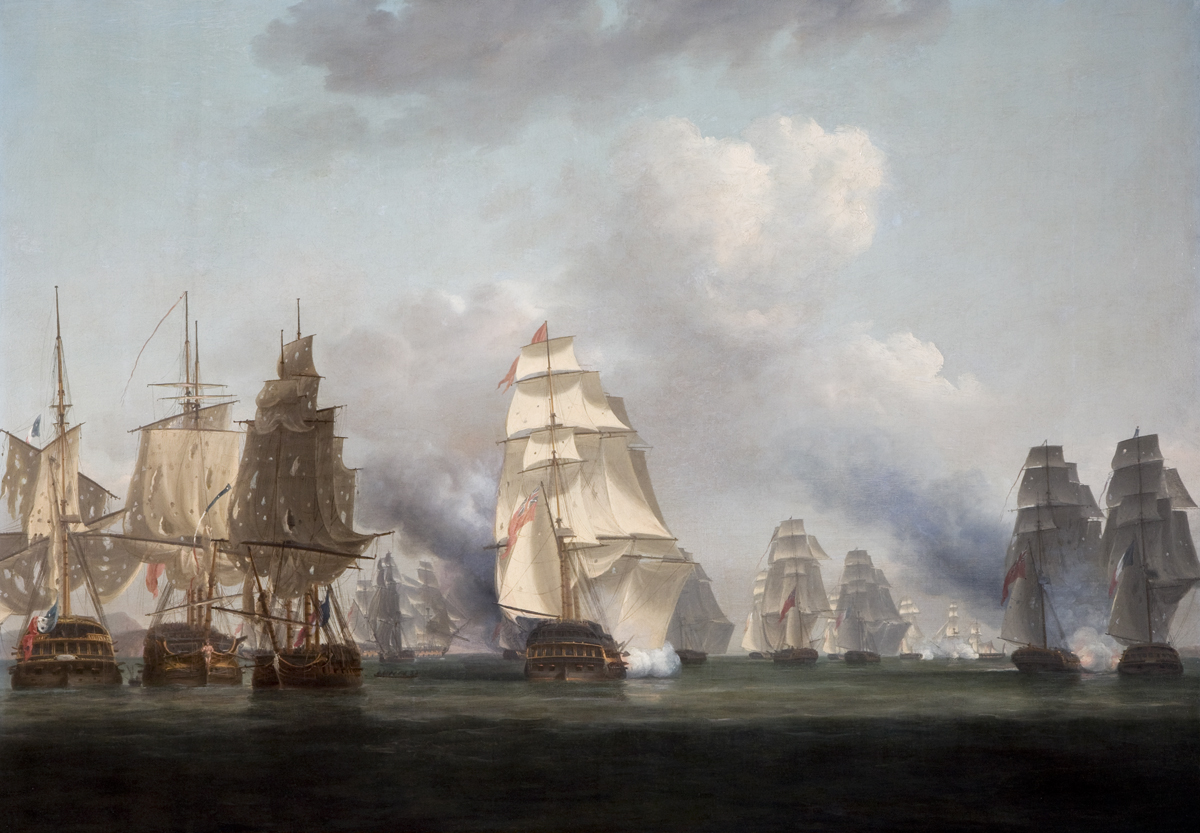
Battle of Tory Island, 12 October 1798, painted by Nicholas Pocock

To Tone's dismay, the French Directory concluded from Humbert's account of his misadventure that the Irish were to be compared with the devoutly Catholic peasantry they had battled at home in the Vendée. He had to rebuff the suggestion that, rather than a secular republic, he consider a restoration of the Jacobite Pretender, Henry Benedict Stuart, as Henry IX, King of the Irish.

On 12 October, Tone was aboard a second French expedition, carrying a force of 3,000 men, that was intercepted off the coast of County Donegal, the Battle of Tory Island. Taken captive, Tone regretted nothing done "to raise three million of my countrymen to the ranks of citizen," and lamented only those "atrocities committed on both sides" during his exile. On the eve of execution, he cut his own throat.

== Human toll ==
=== Casualties ===
In what was to be the most widely read account of the rebellion since its centenary, The Year of Liberty (1969), Thomas Pakenham (overlooking 1741, the famine "year of slaughter") wrote:

The rebellion of 1798 is the most violent and tragic event in Irish history between the Jacobite wars and the Great Famine. In the space of a few weeks, 30,000 – peasants armed with pikes and pitchforks, defenceless women and children – were cut down, shot, or blown like chaff as they charged up to the mouth of the canon.

Thirty thousand is mid range between what had been the contemporary estimates (of which just 2,000 were thought to be Crown forces and 1,000 loyalist civilians). Cullen, in an unpublished 1798-1820 cohort depletion study of County Wexford, where most of the fighting took place, calculated 6,000 killed. Although such studies are highly susceptible to what is called "depletion of susceptibles bias", it is the basis for Bartlett proposing lower death toll of perhaps 10,000 for the entire island. Others insist on the higher numbers, with some arguing that the true toll of rebellion was disguised by relatives hiding their losses for fear of recrimination and reprisal. Given that the deaths occurred over just four months (May to September 1798), R. F. Foster may be correct in suggesting that the rebellion was "the most concentrated episode of violence in Irish history".

=== Rebel outrages ===
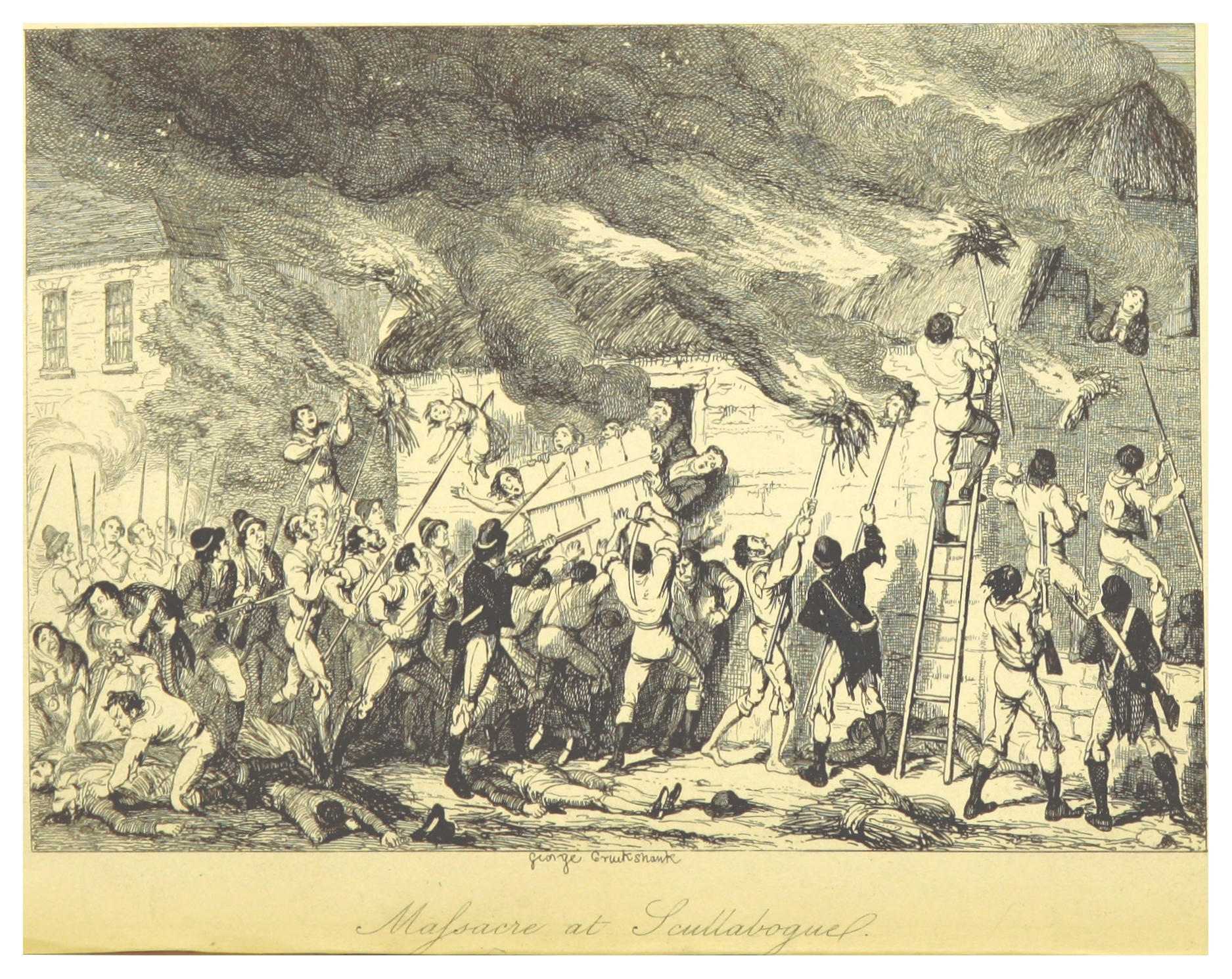
Massacre at Scullabogue, illustrated by George Cruikshank

County Wexford was the only area which saw widespread rebel atrocities. Of these the most notorious were the killings at Scullabogue and on Wexford bridge. After the rebel defeat at New Ross, on June 5 between one to two hundred loyalist hostages, men, women and children, were packed into a barn at Scullabogue that was set alight. Bagenal Harvey resigned his rebel command in protest. In Wexford town on 20 June, after a United Irish "Committee of Public Safety" had been swept aside, seventy loyalist prisoners were marched to the bridge over the River Slaney and piked to death. There were a small number of Catholics among the loyalists killed, and of Protestants among the rebels present. But for government propagandists, the sectarian nature of the outrages was unquestioned.

=== Military atrocities ===
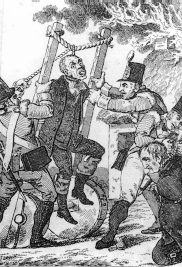
Half-hanging of a suspected rebel, or rebel sympathiser, to extract information.

Accounts of rebel outrages against loyalist civilians circulated widely. These helped secure defections from the republican cause.They also deflected criticism of the military counter terror that had come from otherwise loyal, establishment, figures. Lord Moira (the future Governor-General of India) collated evidence of crimes and abuses by the Crown's forces which he sought to present to the King.

In February 1798, the British commander-in-chief General Sir Ralph Abercromby publicly rebuked his predecessor, Henry Luttrell, Lord Carhampton, for bequeathing an army "in a state of licentiousness, which must render it formidable to everyone but the enemy". But, finding his efforts to restore military discipline and the supremacy of the civil power unsupported by Dublin Castle, he resigned in April. He was replaced by General Gerrard Lake.

With Lake issuing an order to take no prisoners, during the rebellion summary justice was carried into the field. Captured and wounded rebels were killed, sometimes on a large scale, as were camp followers ("the bulk of the dead at Vinegar Hill").

An officer, who has pursued the last of the Wexford fugitives into Meath, reported that in the rebellion "the kings troops never gave quarter . . . hundreds and thousands of wretches were butchered while unarmed on their knees begging for mercy". After accepting their surrender near Curragh, on 27 May Crown forces killed up to 500 Kildare rebels – the Gibbet Rath executions. A further 200 (Wolfe Tone's brother Matthew among them) were executed after Humbert's surrender at Ballinamuck on 9 September.

Civilians in theatres of operation were brutally interrogated and murdered, their houses burned. In county Wexford the military engaged in mass rape and sexual assault of female civilians. Cornwallis, who commanded the response to Humbert's arrival, was moved to threaten his "licentious" soldiery (among whom he counted his Catholic militia the most "ferocious and cruel") with summary execution. During and after the rebellion, using their local knowledge the loyalist Yeomanry engaged in their own reprisals. "Pardoned" rebels were a particular target.

== Women in the rebellion ==
The United Irishmen and the Defenders were male fraternities. There is little record for the Defenders, but for United Irishmen it is clear that women nonetheless played an active role in the movement. By 1797 the Castle informer Francis Higgins was reporting that "women are equally sworn with men" suggesting that some of the women, assuming risks for the United Irish cause, were taking places beside men in an increasingly clandestine organisation. It is in a person named Mrs. Risk, that R.R. Madden, one of the earliest historians of the United Irishmen, summarises their various activities: carrying intelligence, hiding weapons, running safe houses.

In the risings, women came forward in many capacities, some, as celebrated in later ballads (Betsy Gray and Brave Moll Doyle, the Heroine of New Ross), as combatants. At Ballynahinch, where legend has Betsy Gray mounted with a green flag upon white horse, the father of the future Lord Kelvin reported seeing women remain on the field and perform deeds as "valiant as the men". At Vinegar Hill, British officers remarked on "female rebels more vehement than the men", and on the "many women [who] fought with fury". The rebel leader Thomas Cloney claimed that he would have carried the day at New Ross had one tenth of his men had had the "warlike" quality of Molly Doyle of Castlebro.

Women suffered greatly in the counterinsurgency. Abduction and rape were common. Women who "in their hundreds, who crisscrossed the country, seeking help for, or news of, their menfolk", were particularly vulnerable.

== Aftermath ==
=== Last resistance ===
James Corcoran's final defeat, 1804

On 1 July 1798 in Belfast, the birthplace of the United Irish movement, it was reported that no man appeared in the street without wearing the red coat of the Yeomanry. As he enlisted former radicals into his Portglenone Yeomanry, Anglican clergyman Edward Hudson claimed that "the brotherhood of affection [between Catholic and Protestant] is over". However, the widespread return in the winter 1799–1800 of flogging, arms raids and assassinations to rural east Ulster suggests that in Presbyterian districts the spirit of rebellion was not yet extinguished. The holdouts had organised in Defender cells from whose oaths references to religion had been notably dropped.

The execution in February 1800 of one of these irreconcilables, Roddy McCorley "at the bridge of Toome", enters into Irish republican martyrology through a ballad written in the 1890s by Ethna Carberry. At the time, the name that captured the public imagination was that of McCorley's captain, Thomas Archer, a militia turncoat for whom there could be no amnesty. Archer's execution in Ballymena in March 1800 (with his body left hanging in a cage in terrorem for several months), and of fifteen of his confederates, marked the final end of the insurgency in Antrim.

In the south-east, in County Wicklow, the United Irish General, Joseph Holt, fought on until his negotiated surrender in Autumn 1798. It was not until December 1803, following the construction of a military road into the Wicklow Mountains and the failure of Emmet's rising in Dublin, that the last organised rebel forces under Captain Michael Dwyer capitulated. Small pockets of rebel resistance had also survived within Wexford and the last rebel group under James Corcoran was not vanquished until his death in February 1804.

In the west, after Battles of Ballinamuck and Killala, remnants of the "Republic of Connacht" had held out for some months in the hills of Erris and Tyrawley in County Mayo and in Connemara in County Galway from where James MacDonnell, vanquished at Killala, escaped to France.

In Connacht, and in Munster, while there was a return to agrarian agitation, a "fundamental transformation had occurred". Buoyed by continued hopes of French intervention, the resistance to tithe collection in the winter of 1798-99 was both more violent and, for the first time, was associated with oaths and manifestoes that sought, not a lessening of the burden, but a complete repudiation of the right of the landlord's church to levy taxes on the Catholic tenantry.

=== Fate of the United Irish and rebel leadership ===
Taken prisoner, those who had commanded rebels in the field faced court martial and execution. This was the fate of Bagenal Harvey, Fr. Philip Roche, and five others hanged on Wexford Bridge; John Esmonde hanged in Sallins with his coat reversed to indicate that he was a Yeomanry deserter; Watty Graham whose head was paraded through Maghera; Henry Joy McCracken hanged before the Market House in Belfast; Fr John Murphy, stripped, flogged, hanged, decapitated, his corpse burnt in a barrel of tar and his head impaled on a spike in Tullow; Henry Munro whose piked head was displayed on the Market House in Lisburn; and Bartholomew Teeling, whose body was committed to a mass grave for rebels at what became known as Croppies' Acre in Dublin.

The Sheares brothers had been hanged, drawn and quartered in Dublin in July. Once confident that the rebellion had been contained, Cornwallis, and his Chief Secretary, Lord Castlereagh, resisted pressure from the Irish Parliament to proceed against the other directory leaders held as state prisoners. Under terms negotiated by Thomas Addis Emmet, William James MacNeven, and Arthur O'Connor, and confident that government informers had left little to disclose, the prisoners promised to give a full account of their activities to a secret House of Commons committee in return for exile, into which they were released in 1802.

Michael Dwyer negotiated his surrender in December 1803 on terms that permitted him, and all his party, to be transported to New South Wales, Australia, as unsentenced exiles. Reprieved by Cornwallis, in 1799 John Moore, Humbert's President of Connacht, was also to have been transported, but he died in custody.

=== Rebel ministers and priests ===
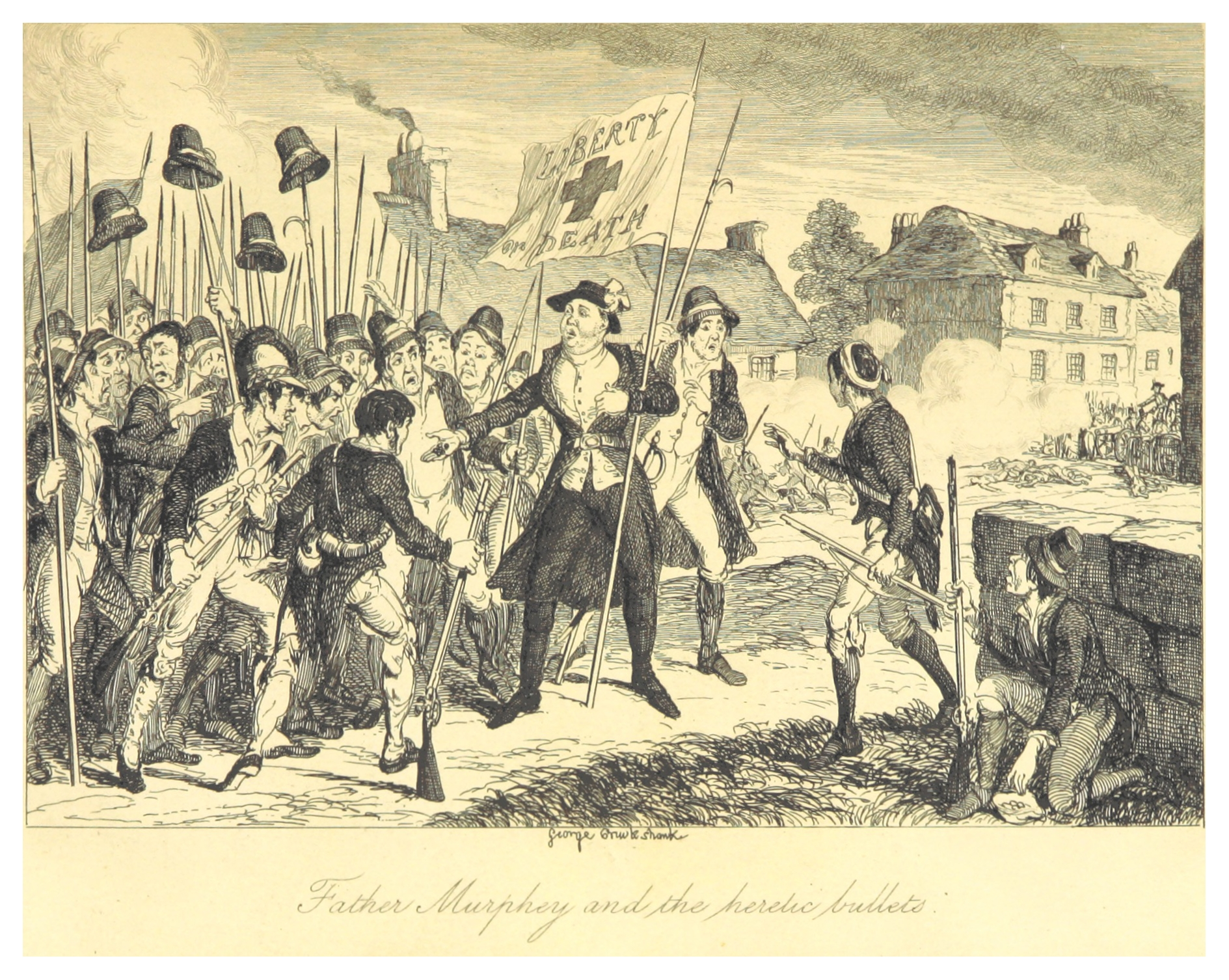
Father John Murphy

In Ulster, some twenty Presbyterian ministers and probationers were implicated in the insurrectionary movement. Two were executed. Others were allowed American exile, including William Steele Dickson, Thomas Ledlie Birch, John Glendy, and, notwithstanding that he had actually led the rebels in the field, the young probationer David Bailie Warden. Reacting to what he identified as "the democratic party in the [Presbyterian] synod, most of whom, if not engaged in the Rebellion, were deeply infected with its principles", Castlereagh moved to condition the size and payment to ministers of the synod's Crown grant (regium donum) upon professions and proofs of loyalty.

In the spirit of reaction, between 1798 and 1800 at least 69 Catholic chapels were destroyed or damaged, mostly in south Leinster. It was not, however, the policy of the government to target the Catholic church. With Cornwallis and Castlereagh, British Prime Minister, William Pitt, was persuaded that, while the Catholic peasantry had been roused, the source of the rebellion had been Jacobinism (of which the Roman Curia was itself a victim) and not Jacobitism.

In February 1798, the French Directory had deposed and imprisoned Pope Pius VI and proclaimed the Roman Republic hardening the opposition of the Irish hierarchy to the republican conspiracy. The Catholic bishops were almost totally united in their condemnation of disaffection, and voiced no criticism of government policy of "the bayonet, the gibbet, and the lash". The ten or so priests involved in the fighting in County Wexford, were rejected by their bishop, James Caufield of Ferns, as "the very faeces of the church", and, indeed, none at the time was accredited to a parish. Two were killed, and four, including Roche and Murphy, were executed. Two priests were also sent to the gallows in Mayo. Their bishop, Dominic Bellew of Killala had served as president of the "committee of public safety" in Ballina but he satisfied Dublin Castle that his sole purpose had been to prevent rebel outrages.

Pitt's plans, conceived in advance of the rebellion, for a legislative union had included a final act of Catholic emancipation. It was only after he had resigned in the face of opposition to admitting Catholic to parliament from the King and court party, that additional measures were thought necessary to secure the loyalty of the Catholic clergy. The government that had since 1795 endowed the Catholic seminary at Maynooth, now proposed that, in return for future episcopal appointments in Ireland being subject to Crown approval, that its graduates enjoy their own regium donum—that, like Presbyterian ministers, priests receive a government stipend. But this too proved too much for the king, and Cornwallis was obliged to withdraw the offer.

=== The Union ===
In August 1800, the Irish Parliament (induced by extensive favours and emoluments) agreed to abolish itself. Under the Acts of Union, Irish representation, purged of many of the pocket boroughs but still narrow and exclusively Protestant, was transferred to Westminster, now styled as the Parliament of the United Kingdom of Great Britain and Ireland.

In seeking to rally support for a renewal of the rebellion in 1803, Robert Emmet argued that if Ireland had cause in 1798, it had only been compounded by subjecting Ireland to "a foreign parliament" in which "seven-eighths of the population have no right to send a member of their body to represent them" and in which the "other eighth part" are "the tools and taskmasters, acting for the cruel English government and their Irish Ascendancy--a monster still worse, if possible than foreign tyranny". Yet at the time, there was no popular protest. This may have reflected the demoralisation that followed the rebellion's crushing defeat, but for the Irish Parliament there was little nostalgia. From exile in Hamburg, Archibald Hamilton Rowan predicted that, in depriving the Anglo-Irish lords of their "corrupt assembly", the union would itself see "the wreck of the old Ascendancy". In opposing the union, this had been the express fear of the Speaker of the Irish House of Commons, John Foster.

=== Emmet's rebellion ===
Emmet and his co-conspirators worked to re-establish the United Irish organisation on strictly military lines, but otherwise planning for a republican rising relied on broadly the same strategy as in '98. Hopes of outside assistance were abandoned in 1802 when what Emmett acknowledged as a "similar attempt in England," the Despard Plot, was crushed, and when French forces under Humbert were assigned by Napoleon, not to the liberation of Ireland, but to the re-enslavement of Haiti. Through a series of mishaps and missteps an attempt in July 1803 to seize Dublin Castle and other key points in the capital, misfired, and rebels in Kildare dispersed. Without promised firearms, Michael Dwyer refused to lead his men down from the Wicklow Mountains. In Ulster, despite being represented by the original Society's two most successful organisers in the north, Thomas Russell and James Hope, the republic proclaimed by Emmet rallied neither former United men nor Defenders.

Many of those arrested or taken prisoner in '98 were transported to penal colonies of New South Wales. In March 1804, when news reached them of Emmet's rising, several hundred convicts mutinied in the hope of capturing ships for a return to Ireland. They were routed in an encounter loyalists celebrated as the Second Battle of Vinegar Hill.

== Contested commemoration ==
=== O'Connell and Young Ireland ===
In 1801, Sir Richard Musgrave's Memoirs of the Different Rebellions in Ireland presented the first "seminal history" of rebellion. "Violently anti-Catholic", it devoted just 12 pages to events in Ulster, compared to 600 on the rebellion in Leinster. Notwithstanding the loyalty of the Catholic Church, the Ascendancy was determined to paint the rebellion as a "Popish" conspiracy. Daniel O'Connell who, enrolled in a yeomanry corps, had sat out the rebellion in his native County Kerry, retorted that the United Irishmen had been the dupes, not of Catholics intent on driving Protestants from Ireland, but of a government seeking a pretext for abolishing the Irish Parliament. Neither in the mass mobilisation he led for Catholic emancipation nor, in the years to the Great Famine, for repeal of the union, did O'Connell invoke the spirit of "'98".

In 1831, Thomas Moore, who, citing the need to engage with the Presbyterian north, refused a parliamentary nomination from O'Connell's a Repeal Association, presented his Life and Death of Lord Edward Fitzgerald as a "justification of the men of '98 – the ultimi Romanorum of our country". His perspective was broadly shared by the Young Irelanders who, on the principle of physical force, broke with O'Connell in 1846. The journalism of the Protestant Young Irelanders Thomas Davis in The Nation, and John Mitchel in the United Irishman, accorded 1798 an honoured place in a nationalist narrative. R. R. Madden's eleven-volume The United Irishmen, their lives and times (1842–1860) advanced the same political rehabilitation.

=== Centenary 1898 ===
In pilgrimages to Wolfe Tone's graveside at Bodenstown, County Kildare, first held in 1873, a new generation of Irish republicans claimed the legacy of the rebellion. But in the sectarian polarisation that marked consideration of the 1886 and 1893 Home Rule bills, narrower interpretations prevailed. "Despite the enthusiastic republicanism expressed by so many of the early organisers" (among them veterans of physical-force Fenianism), the Centenary celebrations in Dublin bore "the stamp" of constitutional nationalism, O'Connell's home-rule successors. The public were assured that the United Irishmen had been established to secure Catholic emancipation and parliamentary reform, and had only taken up arms, and the cause of a republic, once the obstinacy of the Ascendancy had closed all constitutional paths.

Finding Protestants loath to acknowledge their connection to those she saw as having sealed Tone's union of creeds on "the battle field and scaffold", Alice Milligan had to confine her commemorative displays in Belfast to Catholic districts. A processive outing to the grave of Betsy Gray, heroine of the Battle of Ballynahinch, ended in a fracas and the destruction of her memorial stone. Unionists willing to recall the turnout under McCracken and Munro, insisted that had their forefathers been offered a Union under the British constitution as it later developed there would have been "no rebellion".

The centenary year saw the fifth and sixth editions of Fr. Patrick Kavanagh's A Popular History of the Insurrection of 1798 (1874). Kavanagh's did not, as has been suggested, depict the rebellion as "a purely Catholic affair", but neither did he see cause to profile the republicanism of the United directories. Later Wexford historians were to criticise him for advancing "the concept of the priest leader . . . to a degree which did not exist in contemporary accounts", and for remaining silent on the hierarchy's condemnation of those of their priests who did take to the field.

=== Sesquicentennial 1948 ===
In 1948, attempting, post-partition, to organise Protestant participation in a commemoration of the 150th anniversary, writer Denis Ireland, and trade unionists Victor Halley and Jack MacGougan, were denied permission to rally in Belfast's city centre. Instead, it was from nationalist west Belfast, that they led a procession to McArt's Fort, the site overlooking the town where in June 1795 Wolfe Tone and members of the United Irish northern executive took an oath "never to desist in our efforts until we had subverted the authority of England over our country".

In the south, in Éire, the sesquicentennial of the rebellion was background to the consideration and passage of the Republic of Ireland Act 1948, which came into effect on 18 April 1949, Easter Monday, the 33rd anniversary of the beginning of the 1916 Easter Rising.

In 1960, the accidental discovery of the remains of John Moore occasioned a state funeral in Castlebar. President Éamon de Valera (veteran of 1916), together with the ambassadors of France and (Francoist) Spain, honoured Moore as both "Ireland's first president" and (with greater poetic license) (Note: Thomas More's descendants had all died out by 1807, with no link to Ireland.) "a descendant of [the Catholic martyr] St Thomas More".

=== Bicentennial 1998 ===
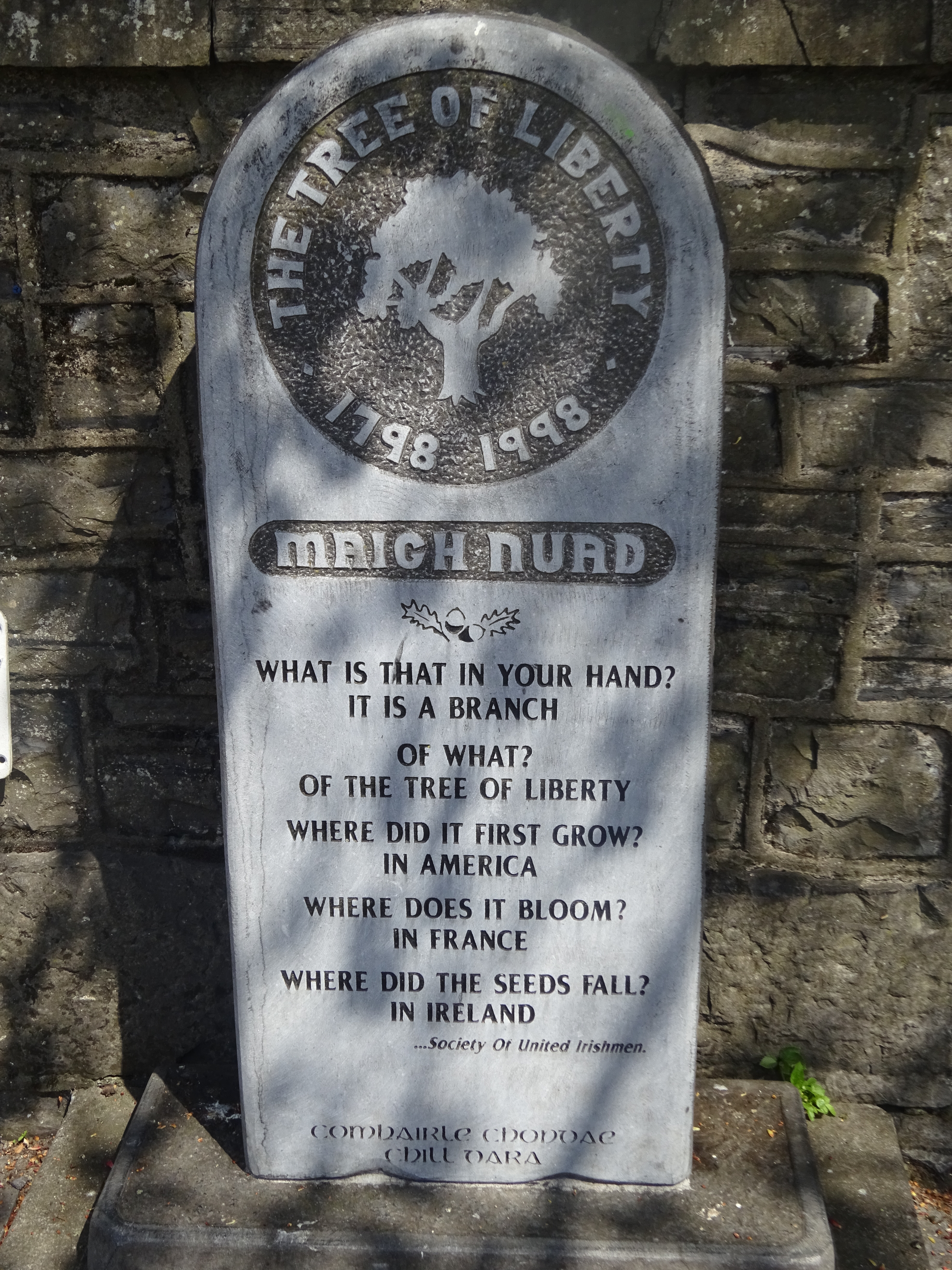
Tree of Liberty monument in Maynooth, noting the influence of the American and French Revolutions

The 1998 bicentenary coincided with the Good Friday, Belfast Agreement and with the hopes entertained for reconciliation after thirty years in Northern Ireland of political violence. Writing against the background of the Troubles, the Ulster historian A. T. Q. Stewart had argued that the United Irish strategy had been a "failure": the course of the rebellion had demonstrated that "sectarian strife was a much stronger tradition than unity". But in the bicentenary year, scholarship reverted to a more "romantic, celebratory style of history writing". There was criticism not only of Kavanagh's "faith and fatherland" interpretation of the rebellion, but also, with its heavy reliance on the available loyalist sources, of Thomas Pakenham's celebrated The Year of Liberty (1969), and of its thesis that the rebellion was essentially a peasant revolt. The official commemorations again emphasised the United Irishmen's' non-sectarian, enlightened, French and American-inspired, democratic ideals, with historians noting that the societies were organised and rose in the east, in Ireland's "the most economically advanced, outward looking, anglophone areas".

In the Republic, the government described itself as having

... set out to avoid what we identified as a flaw in the commemorations of 1898, 1938 and 1948. That is the excessive emphasis on the Catholic Nationalist version of the rebellion which saw 1798 only as a crusade for faith and fatherland. Inevitably, that partisan approach alienated many others, including the descendants of the Ulster United Irishmen who had been so much to the forefront in the 1790s.

Contrary to what it characterised as the "sectarian and narrow-minded folklore" of the rebellion, The Irish Times noted that even in Wexford, typically associated with fighting priests, Protestants had played a leading role. Executed alongside Bagenal Harvey on Wexford Bridge, Matthew Keogh, the United governor of Wexford town, had also been a member of the established Church of Ireland. So had four of the eight members of the town's committee and all three United colonels for the baronies of Forth and Bargy. How, asked the popular historian Kevin Whelan, can we explain the risings occurring in "the Anglophone rich east coast strip from Antrim to Wexford" without an explicit recognition of the "mass politicisation" of the 1790s. If sectarianism was the key, why not in Armagh; if agrarian conditions, why not in poorest counties of the Atlantic coastline or in Tipperary, the centre of peasant unrest.

Not all historians contributed in the spirit of the official commemorations. There were those who continued to argue that "the central sectarian component of popular politics and culture in the 1790s" remained regardless of "the United Irishmen's ideological and organisational presence". As an expression of Presbyterian radicalism, the republicanism of the movement could, in any case, be seen as a "continuation of the war against popery by other means". In the south-east, there was still scholarship supporting Louis Cullen's thesis that the rebellion "was a local sectarian civil war between Catholic and Protestant gentry and large tenant farmers".

=== 1798 in the Ulster-Scots retelling ===
Under the Belfast Agreement, the bicentennial year saw the creation of the Ulster Scots Agency (Tha Boord o Ulstèr-Scotch), which has advanced its own reclamation of 1798. Its publications, including materials for schools, portray the Ulster Scots (broadly the Presbyterians of Ulster) as having been, while not their equal as the victims of the Ascendancy, in advance of Catholics in the demand for change. The rebellion in Ulster is described as "a struggle for fairness, equal rights, and democracy" in which the militancy of the United Irishmen reflects the character of "a people prepared to agitate when faced with discrimination and unfairness".

Enlightenment ideas are acknowledged, but they are those of the Scottish Enlightenment. Through the moral philosophy of an Ulsterman, Francis Hutcheson, these draw on the covenanting tradition of Presbyterian resistance to royal and episcopal imposition. Flowing through various channels, they stiffen the resolve of the American patriots (with the "Scotch-Irish" prominent in their ranks). Once affirmed, first by American independence and then by the French Declaration of the Rights of Man and the Citizen, they return to Ulster in the liberal-patriotic resolutions of the Volunteers and of the United Irishmen.

It is a story (frequently citing the Ulster historian A. T. Q. Stewart) sceptical of the promised unity of creeds. The risings in Leinster are described as having "the paraphernalia of Roman Catholicism ... more in evidence than the symbolism of the United Irishmen". With Catholics enrolled in the militia, it is also proposed that the union of Protestant, Catholic and Dissenter was "more closely realised in the forces of the crown".

The result is an interpretation of the rebellion which remains Protestant-centric without restricting itself to the traditional unionist celebration of British loyalties and identity. Recalled in this manner, sociologist Peter Gardner suggests that the Rebellion of 1798 advances an "ethnicising of Ulster Protestants". They are reimagined as a "disenfranchised and indignant" community "outside of the bounds of colonial power in Ireland", rather than, as they appear in the traditional Irish nationalist historiography, "its custodians".

Broadly the same interpretation was advanced by the education committee of the Grand Orange Lodge of Ireland with a bi-centenary programme that included re-enactments of the battles of Antrim and Ballynahinch. While acknowledging that "members of the [Orange] institution in 1798 supported the forces of the Crown and in many instances whole lodges joined the yeomanry", the institution, nonetheless, commemorates 1798 "because of the elements of shared history, social justice and `disaffection'."

=== Memorials ===
In the Republic of Ireland there are at least 85 public monuments and memorials acknowledging the patriot dead of 1798, including the national Garden of Remembrance in Dublin.

In Northern Ireland, the Down District 1798 Bicentennial Committee installed informational plaques to mark the battles of Saintfield and Ballynahinch.

In 1900, a large monument commemorating those "who suffered for the parts they took in the memorable insurrection in 1798" was erected over the grave of Michael Dwyer in the Waverley Cemetery, Sydney, Australia.

== List of major engagements ==
Date	Location	Battle	Result
24 May	Ballymore Eustace, County Kildare	Battle of Ballymore-Eustace	United Irishmen repulsed
24 May	Naas, County Kildare	Battle of Naas	United Irishmen repulsed
24–28 May	Rathangan, County Kildare	Battle of Rathangan	United Irish victory, rebels repulsed 28 May
24 May	Prosperous, County Kildare	Battle of Prosperous	United Irish victory
24 May	Old Kilcullen, County Kildare	Battle of Old Kilcullen	United Irish defeat Cavalry force and advance on Kilcullen
24 May	Kilcullen, County Kildare	Battle of Kilcullen	British victory
25 May	Carnew, County Wicklow	Carnew massacre	British execute 38 prisoners
25 May	Dunlavin, County Wicklow	Dunlavin Green massacre	British execute 36 prisoners
25 May	Carlow, County Carlow	Battle of Carlow	British victory, rising in Carlow crushed
26 May	The Harrow, County Wexford	Battle of the Harrow	United Irish victory
26 May	Hill of Tara, County Meath	Battle of Tara Hill	British victory, Rising in Meath defeated
27 May	Oulart, County Wexford	Battle of Oulart Hill	United Irish victory
28 May	Enniscorthy, County Wexford	Battle of Enniscorthy	United Irish victory
29 May	Curragh, County Kildare	Gibbet Rath massacre	British execute 300–500 rebels
30 May	Newtownmountkennedy, County Wicklow	Battle of Newtownmountkennedy	British victory
30 May	Forth Mountain, County Wexford	Battle of Three Rocks	United Irish victory, Wexford taken
1 June	Bunclody, County Wexford	Battle of Bunclody	British victory
4 June	Tuberneering, County Wexford	Battle of Tuberneering	United Irish victory, British counter-attack repulsed
5 June	New Ross, County Wexford	Battle of New Ross	British victory
5 June	Scullabogue, County Wexford	Scullabogue massacre	Irish rebels kill 100–200 loyalists
7 June	Antrim, County Antrim	Battle of Antrim	United Irishmen repulsed
9 June	Arklow, County Wicklow	Battle of Arklow	United Irishmen repulsed
9 June	Saintfield, County Down	Battle of Saintfield	United Irish victory
12–13 June	Ballynahinch, County Down	Battle of Ballynahinch	British victory
19 June	Shannonvale, County Cork	Battle of the Big Cross	British victory
19 June	near Kilcock, County Kildare	Battle of Ovidstown	British victory
20 June	Foulkesmill, County Wexford	Battle of Foulksmills	British victory
21 June	Enniscorthy, County Wexford	Battle of Vinegar Hill	British victory
23 June	Carrigmoclear Hill near Grangemockler, County Tipperary	Battle of Carrigmoclear	British victory
30 June	near Carnew, County Wicklow	Battle of Ballyellis	United Irish victory
11 July	Leinster Bridge, Clonard, County Meath	Battle of Clonard	British Victory
25 July	Rathcroghan, County Roscommon	Battle of Rathcroghan	United Irish victory
27 August	Castlebar, County Mayo	Battle of Castlebar	United Irish/French victory
5 September	Collooney, County Sligo	Battle of Collooney	United Irish/French victory
8 September	Ballinamuck, County Longford	Battle of Ballinamuck	British victory
23 September	Killala, County Mayo	Battle of Killala	British victory
12 October	near Tory Island, County Donegal	Battle of Tory Island	British victory

== See also ==
- Atlantic Revolutions
- Battles during the 1798 rebellion
- Castle Hill convict rebellion in Sydney, Australia
- French Revolutionary Wars
- Irish issue in British politics
- List of Irish rebellions
- List of monuments and memorials to the Irish Rebellion of 1798
- Society of United Irishmen
- United Irish Uprising in Newfoundland
- Wars of national liberation

== Notes ==
Preceded by French campaign in Egypt and Syria	French Revolution: Revolutionary campaigns Irish Rebellion of 1798	Succeeded by Quasi-War
