= James Corcoran =

Irish rebel leader

James Corcoran (c. 1780–1804) was an Irish rebel leader who following the suppression of the Irish Rebellion of 1798, maintained a guerrilla resistance to the British Crown in County Wexford and County Kilkenny until his final defeat and death in 1804.

== Rebel activities ==
Corcoran proclaimed December 1798

Corcoran played an active part in the 1798 rebellion and led a party of rebels at the battle of New Ross. It is thought he participated in Father Murphy's march into Kilkenny and Carlow following the defeat at Vinegar Hill and that during the retreat back into Wexford following defeat at Kilcumney he was a leading figure in the rearguard made up of locals. Their knowledge of the area tied down pursuing British forces at the Scullogh Gap allowing the bulk of the rebel army to escape.

Following the collapse of the rebellion, he and a group of survivors established a base in Killaughrim Woods, north County Wexford from where they launched raids in the area and into County Carlow. In December 1798 a reward of £500 was announced for "repeated acts of High Treason, and for furthering the Rebellion that lately broke out in Ireland".

In August 1801, an upsurge in Corcoran's activities saw him and his men being declared "dangerous in case of invasion" by Dublin Castle and consequently, a force of 200 soldiers was sent to find and destroy the group. However, they met with little success as the populace shielded them from the military.

Corcoran's men were distinguished by their willingness to allow deserters from the military in their ranks and actively sought to subvert soldiers billeted among the populace or at least rob them of their arms. Their fearlessness was demonstrated in an incident near Mount Leinster in June 1802 when they turned to attack a number of pursuing Newtownbarry yeomen who were defeated and soon under pursuit themselves.

The defeat of Robert Emmet's rising in July 1803, saw renewed British intent to wipe out all remaining rebel activity in Ireland and a new campaign was launched against Corcoran. This time account was taken of the fact that Corcoran's men enjoyed support from the population in areas where they operated and also that their permanent bases were in remote localities. Consequently, arrests and severe penalties were handed out to those suspected of harbouring rebels, and the building of military roads and barrack were planned to cover the area between Mount Leinster and the Blackstair mountains.

== Defeat and death ==
James Corcoran's last stand 11 February 1804

The surrender of Michael Dwyer in December 1803 left Corcoran and his men as the only rebel faction still active in Ireland as 1804 began. The ongoing military offensive had by now forced Corcoran to relocate to south Kilkenny from where he continued operations and further incensed the government by targeting mail coaches. However the pressure soon forced him to split his group into smaller factions and return to his old base at Killaughrim Woods outside Enniscorthy. The end finally came on 11 February 1804 an informer betrayed the location of Corcoran and his remaining few comrades who were surrounded by a party of yeomen at Killaughrim Woods. After fierce resistance all of the unit were killed or captured, Corcoran dying of his wounds shortly after the fighting. His body and that of his comrades were brought to Wexford where they were hung outside the town gaol and left on display for a time.

== Sources ==
- O'Donnell, R. (1998). The Rebellion in Wicklow, 1798. ISBN 0-7165-2659-X.
- O'Donnell, R. (2000). Aftermath: Post-Rebellion Insurgency in Wicklow, 1799–1803. ISBN 0-7165-2638-7.
