= Battle of Bunclody =

- Part of the Irish Rebellion
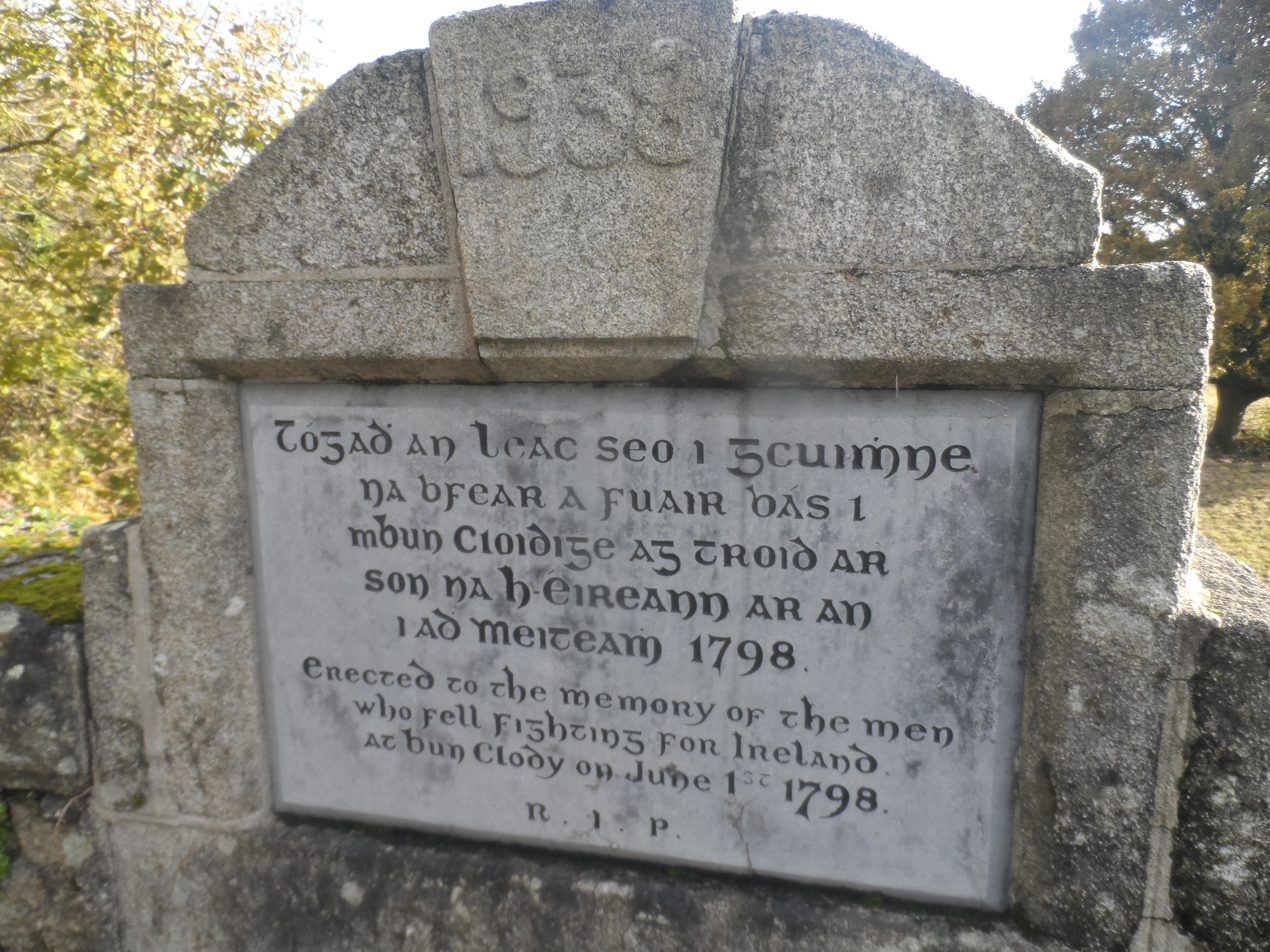
- Memorial erected in 1938
Date	1 June 1798
Location	Bunclody, County Wexford
Result	Rebels seize Bunclody but are then repelled by British.

Belligerents
United Irishmen	(Kingdom of Great Britain) British Army: (Kingdom of Ireland) Loyalists

Commanders and leaders
Mogue Kearns	?

Strength
5,000	?

Casualties and losses
400 killed	1 killed 1 wounded (Government claim)

The battle of Bunclody or Newtownbarry as it was then called, was a battle in the Irish Rebellion of 1798, which took place on 1 June 1798 when a force of approximately 5,000 rebels led by Catholic priest Fr. Mogue Kearns attacked the garrison at Bunclody.

The garrison was forewarned of the approaching rebels and had prepared defensive outposts facing the rebel line of advance. The rebel army occupied high ground to the west and stationed an artillery piece, captured in their victory over the military at the battle of Three Rocks, facing the approaches to town. As the bulk of the rebel army formed for the attack, their gunners opened an accurate fire on the exposed lines of soldiers who retreated into the cover of the town.

Seizing the moment, the rebels quickly moved in, forcing the garrison to flee across the bridge into County Carlow but crucially, failed to occupy this approach to the town. The rebels now had an almost bloodless victory and numbers of them began to celebrate, roaming the town in search of plunder and enemies. As rebel discipline began to waver, trapped units of yeomen, some of whom had barricaded themselves into their own houses, opened fire on the unsuspecting rebels milling in the streets outside.

Meanwhile, the garrison had paused in their retreat and upon hearing the sound of gunfire from the town, turned about and launched a surprise attack back across the bridge, which caught the rebels, distracted by the unexpected pockets of resistance, completely by surprise. In the rout that followed, 400 of the rebels were killed and their army scattered for the loss of just one killed and one wounded according to official report.
