= Battle of Ballyellis =

Clash during the Irish Rebellion of 1798

- Part of the Irish Rebellion
- Depiction of the battle.
Date	30 June 1798
Location	near Carnew, County Wicklow
Result	Irish victory

Belligerents
United Irishmen	(Kingdom of Great Britain) British Army: (Kingdom of Ireland) Irish loyalists

Commanders and leaders
Joseph Holt	Colonel Puleston

Strength
~1,000 (including civilians)	~200

Casualties and losses
None	62 killed

The Battle of Ballyellis on 30 June 1798 was a clash during the Irish Rebellion of 1798 (Éirí Amach 1798 in Irish), between a surviving column of the dispersed Wexford rebel army and pursuing British forces which resulted in a victory for the rebels.

== Background ==
The British victory at Vinegar Hill on 21 June had denied the rebels static bases of operation but had not finished the rebellion and at least three major columns of rebels were operating throughout the southeast, moving outwards from county Wexford in an effort to spread and revive the rebellion.

One such column, numbering about 1,000 but accompanied by a number of women and juveniles was mobile in north county Wexford, continually altering course to elude combined movements of pursuing British forces. The column was led by Joseph Holt, and under his command Denis Taaffe. It headed in the direction of Carnew, County Wicklow toward the security offered by its mountain ranges when one of its foraging parties was intercepted and destroyed by a cavalry patrol. It quickly became evident to the British authorities that this party was a detachment from the main body of rebels and a mounted force of 200 troops consisting of Ancient Britons, dragoons, and three yeomanry corps, assembled near the neighbourhood of Monaseed to begin a pursuit of the rebels.

== Battle of Ballyellis ==
However, the approaching British had been spotted and a force of rebels then moved ahead of the main force to prepare an ambush at the townland of Ballyellis. The spot chosen was behind a curve in the road flanked by high ditches and estate walls; wagons were then placed on the road and access points cut into the ditches. The main force arrived and deployed itself behind the wagons, on the wall and ditches with a small force left to stand on the road ahead of the barricades standing to face and lure in the approaching soldiers.

Upon spotting the small force standing on the road, the pursuing British quickened their pace and charged forwards, assuming that they were facing only the rearguard of the fleeing column. Upon reaching the turn, they were met by a barrage of gunfire and hemmed in by the rebels on three sides. As more mounted troops arrived they pressed their comrades further into the trap making effective manoeuvre impossible and many were easily picked off by the long pikes of the rebels.

The rear-ranks quickly fled with a few more soldiers escaping by jumping their mounts over the ditch but the rebels organised a relentless pursuit of the soldiers who were tracked and killed through the adjoining fields. At the end of the action about 60 troops (including a French émigré) and two officers were killed for no rebel casualties.

== Aftermath ==
The news of this rebel victory came as a shock to the authorities in Dublin Castle who had assumed that the offensive capabilities of the rebels had been finished at the battle of Vinegar Hill. Reports of the defeat were downplayed and the scale of losses withheld from the general public, but the military now recognised Wicklow as the main theatre of rebel operations and began to transfer troops there in anticipation of a new anti-insurgency campaign.

== Sources ==
- O'Donnell, Ruan (1998). The Rebellion in Wicklow, 1798. Irish Academic Press. ISBN 978-0-7165-2659-9.
- Cullen, Luke (1998). O'Donnell, Ruan (ed.). Insurgent Wicklow, 1798: The Story as Written by Luke Cullen O.D.C. Kestrel Books. ISBN 978-1-900505-55-0.
- Holt, Joseph (1998). O'Shaughnessy, Peter (ed.). Rebellion in Wicklow: General Joseph Holt's Personal Account of 1798. Four Courts Press. ISBN 978-1-85182-366-6.
