= Ralph Dundas =

British Army general

General Ralph Dundas (1730 – 7 February 1814) was a Scottish officer of the British Army.

== Early life ==
Ralph Dundas was the son of John Dundas of Manour (1701–1780) and Anne Murray, daughter of John Murray of Polmaise. In 1730 his father bought the Airthrey estate and built Airthrey House there in 1747. They sold the house in 1759 to the Haldane family (who rebuilt it as Airthrey Castle).

== Military career ==
He was appointed cornet in the 4th Regiment of Dragoons in 1755, and in February 1762 he obtained the command of a troop in the 11th Regiment of Dragoons, then serving in Germany under Prince Ferdinand of Brunswick. His regiment returned to England in the following year; in 1770 he was appointed to the majority, and in 1775 to the lieutenant-colonelcy of that distinguished corps. His zealous attention to all his duties, as commanding officer of the 11th Dragoons, was rewarded in 1781 with the rank of colonel; in 1790, with that of major-general; He was sent by Horse Guards to command the Army Corps of the Irish Midlands with the rank of lieutenant-general based at Castle Martin, County Kildare. During May 1798 he was involved in many rebel encounters around Kilcullen, during the United Irishmen's rebellion when as many as 1,000 of the enemy were under arms. They were beaten at Turnpike Hill, but the British, and Dundas in particular had a nasty initial shock on 23–24 May at Ballymore. He arranged surrender terms with the rebels who had now amassed on Knockaulin Hill. General Lake, commander-in-chief of British troops in Ireland, then arrived to assist the surrender. He insisted the rebels came down to the avenue of Castlemartin House to surrender (which they refused) and would not be bound by the term ending free quartering on the populace. To avert a breakdown Dundas took it upon himself to go up Knockaulin Hill with two dragoons and the rebel negotiators to take surrender of arms on 27 May, Whit-Monday, ensuring the rebel surrender on humane terms. Unfortunately his efforts were not completely successful as men under the command of General James Duff later massacred a large number of rebels at Gibbet Rath in the Curragh of Kildare on 29 May 1798.

=== Battle of Courtrai ===
Ralph Dundas was appointed to replace Edward Mansel as commanding officer of The Blues and The Royals, encamped west of Tournai. The French under Pichegru advanced with 30,000 men in three columns in thick mud, leaving his right flank unprotected along the Lille-Tournai Road. the Duke of York and General Harcourt saw an opportunity to unleash the Heavy Brigade to the south. The French infantry settled on the village of Willems, and although the French cavalry tried to go to their aid, they were cut off. British artillery bombarded the small French squares, which broke. The British cavalry pursued them over the boggy plain killing 2000 French, taking 400 prisoners, and 14 guns. The British casualties were very light. Early in the battle, Dundas ordered a detachment to capture artillery at the village of Basisieux. A fleeing French General tried to get away, was confronted and run through by Pvt Joseph White, to great acclaim.

=== Later military career ===
On 30 July 1794, he received the colonelcy of the 8th, or the King's Regiment of Foot. He was promoted to the rank of lieutenant-general in 1797, and to that of general in 1802: he was also rewarded with the government of Duncannon Fort.

== Personal life and death ==
His Edinburgh home was at Ravelrig House, south-west of the city. He died in London on 7 February 1814, aged 84.

== Family ==
In 1780 he married Diana Moies in Fulford, North Yorkshire. He divorced her in 1796 due to her adultery with Dr Craven Foulis Brown of Beverley in Yorkshire.

His son, Ralph Peter Dundas, was Commissioner of Excise at Dublin, and died there in 1828.

He was uncle to Sir Ralph Abercromby and maternal grandfather to John Ramsay of Ochtertyre.
