= Dunlavin Green executions =

1798 summary execution of alleged rebels by the Irish Yeomanry in Dunlavin

- Location: Dunlavin, County Wicklow, Ireland
- Date: 26 May 1798
- Attack type: Firing squad
- Deaths: 36
- Injuries: 3
- Perpetrator: Irish Yeomanry

The Dunlavin Green executions was summary execution of 36 suspected United Irishmen rebels in County Wicklow, Ireland by the Irish Yeomanry shortly after the outbreak of the rebellion of 1798. There are several accounts of the events, recorded at differing times and differing in detail.

== Background ==
Beginning in 1796, the British government had begun raising yeomanry forces in Ireland. These forces, composed of both Catholics and Protestants, were raised to help defend against a possible French invasion of Ireland and to aid in the policing of the country. The United Irishmen had long threatened a rebellion in Ireland, which finally occurred in late May 1798. Major uprisings of the rebellion only occurred in Ulster, Wicklow and Wexford, a county in the province of Leinster. For several months prior to May 1798, Wicklow and many other areas of the country had been subject to martial law which had been imposed in an effort to prevent the long threatened rebellion.

The campaign against the United Irishmen extended the military itself as some corps of yeomanry and militia, especially those with Catholic members, were suspected as United Irishmen infiltrators who had joined to get training and arms. Several days after the outbreak of the rebellion, the yeomanry and militia at Dunlavin were called out on parade and informed by their commanding officer that he had information on the identities of those in the corps who were affiliated with the United Irishmen among them. The officer did not actually have such information, but twenty-eight men fell for his bluff and came forward in hopes of receiving clemency.

The twenty-eight who came forward were immediately arrested and imprisoned, several of them being subjected to flogging in an effort to extract information about the plans and organization of the United Irishmen. Those who were outed as affiliates of the United Irishmen were imprisoned in the Market House of Dunlavin, while their officers decided what to do with them.

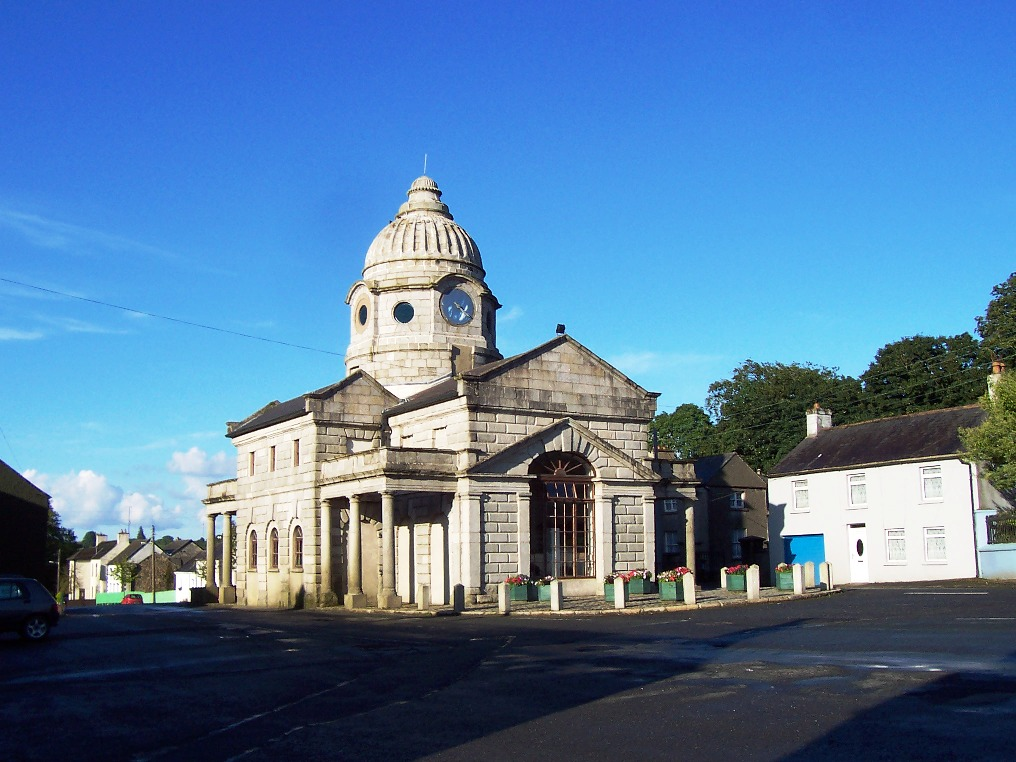
Dunlavin Market House, where the victims were held before being executed

== Executions ==
The following day, Captain William Ryves of the Rathsallagh yeomanry had his horse shot from under him by rebels while on patrol. Ryves rode to Dunlavin the next day and brought eight suspected rebels imprisoned by his corps with him. There he met with Captain Saunders of the Saunders-grove yeomanry. It was decided that their prisoners, a total of 36 men, should be summarily executed. On 26 May, Market Day, the 36 were taken to the green, lined up and shot in front of the townspeople, including, in some cases, their own families.

The firing squad returned to the Market House where others were flogged or hanged. Before the bodies of the shot men were removed, soldiers' wives looted them of valuables; one wounded man protested but he was finished off by a soldier. The bodies were either removed for burial by their families or interred in a common grave ("large pit") at Tournant cemetery. One man survived, despite grievous wounds, and lived to "an advanced age". Two more men, either hanging or about to be, were saved by the intervention of a "respectable Protestant" and escaped.

One loyalist account details the events leading up to the execution differently.

According to this account, Captain Ryves, a yeomanry commander at Dunlavin, received word that a large number of rebels were set to attack Dunlavin and he observed that many Protestant houses had been set on fire in the surrounding countryside. Under the circumstances, he expected that the rebels' intention was a pogrom of Protestants and loyalists in the town and its environs. A foray by the troops into the countryside failed and the garrison's officers were aware that they were outnumbered by the prisoners held in the Market House.

=== Analysis ===
The executions appear to have been motivated by simple revenge and intimidation, rather than fear of the prisoners and the ongoing rebellion. Though the public exhibition may have been designed to intimidate and discourage rebels in the immediate area from taking to the field, news of the executions, as well as those at Carnew spread rapidly and played a part in the rapid mobilization of rebels in northern County Wexford over the next few days.

== Commemoration ==
The story of Dunlavin Green was quickly commemorated in the famous ballad "Dunlavin Green", which tells the story from the view of a sympathetic local eyewitness. In 1998, a commemorative stone was installed in St Nicholas of Myra Roman Catholic church, adjacent to the green.

== See also ==
- Carnew executions
- Gibbet Rath executions
