= Battle of Ballymore-Eustace =

Battle during the Irish Rebellion of 1798

- Part of the Irish Rebellion
Date	24 May 1798
Location	Ballymore Eustace, County Kildare
Result	British victory

Belligerents
(Kingdom of Great Britain) Great Britain	Ireland

Commanders and leaders
Captain Beevor	Unknown

Strength
80	200

Casualties and losses
12 dead, 5 wounded	50 dead, unknown wounded

The Battle of Ballymore-Eustace was one of the events in the United Irish rebellion of 1798. It took place on 24 May 1798 after the stationing of the 9th Dragoons, and members of the Tyrone, Antrim and Armagh Militias at Ballymore in County Kildare near the Kildare-Wicklow border on 10 May. The town had been recently garrisoned by almost 200 soldiers and militia who had been sent to repress sedition in the area. The troops had been dispersed in billets among the populace as per counter-insurgency practice of "free-quarters" where responsibility for the provisioning and sheltering of militia was foisted onto the populace. During this time a quantity of arms were surrendered and letters of protection issued.

On 23 May 120 soldiers were recalled, leaving a garrison of around 80 men. At around 1 a.m. on 24 May, the rebel force of approx. 200 attacked the town. As in the attacks on Naas and Prosperous, the rebels sought to surprise and overwhelm the garrison by coordinated attacks before it could react and rally against them. The houses containing troops of the 9th Dragoons and the Tyrone Militia were to be attacked simultaneously.

However, the attack on garrison headquarters was miscarried due to lack of coordination and numbers so that the building became a rallying point for the Government troops. Captain Beevor was attacked in his own bedchamber by two rebels. Lieutenant Parkinson and some dragoons came to his aid and both rebels were slain. Other isolated billets were attacked but some units managed to cut themselves free and fight their way through the streets to the headquarters. A number of properties, including the Protestant church, were set on fire.

For two hours, the rebels attacked the strongpoint but without artillery, were unable to take the building and lost many men in the process. The momentum had by now slipped away from the rebels and they drew off their attack leaving behind around 50 dead but at a cost to the garrison of at least 12 dead and 5 wounded.

The battle led directly to the Dunlavin Green massacre , in which fears of a possible rebel attack on the garrison at nearby Dunlavin led to the summary execution of rebel prisoners.
