= Joseph Holt (rebel) =

Irish general, farmer and leader of a large guerrilla force

- Holt in military uniform.
- Born: 1756; Ballydaniel, Redcross, County Wicklow, Ireland
- Died: 16 May 1823 (aged 66–67); Kingstown (now Dún Laoghaire), County Dublin
- Occupation: Farmer
- Military career
- Allegiance: United Irishmen; Convict rebels
- Known for: Prominent leader of 1798 Rebellion

Joseph Holt (1756 – 16 May 1826) was a United Irish general and leader of a large guerrilla force which fought against British troops in County Wicklow from June–October 1798. He was exiled in 1799 to the colony of New South Wales (since 11 Jan 1800, Australia) where he worked as a farm manager for NSW Corp Paymaster Captain William Cox and later returned to Ireland in 1814.

== Background ==
Holt was one of six sons of John Holt, a farmer in County Wicklow. The Holt family were Protestant loyalists in Ballydaniel (Ballydonnell) near Redcross who arrived in Ireland as Elizabethan or planters under James I.

Holt, upon marrying Hester Long [maternally of the Manning ("Oranger") family] in 1782, set himself up as a farmer in the vicinity of Roundwood. He joined the Irish Volunteers in the 1780s and held a number of minor public offices such as an inspector of wool and cloth but became involved in law enforcement as a sub-constable, billet master for the militia and a bounty hunter. Holt was involved in The Battle of Vinegar Hill which was an engagement during the Irish Rebellion of 1798 on 21 June 1798 when over 15,000 British soldiers launched an attack on Vinegar Hill outside Enniscorthy, County Wexford.

== First trial ==
Despite Holt's apparent loyalism, he became a member of the Society of United Irishmen in 1797 and gradually began to attract suspicion until finally in May 1798, his house was burned down by the militia of Fermanagh, instigated by the local landlord, Thomas Hugo, who owed Holt a sum of money. Holt then took to the Wicklow mountains, gradually assuming a position of prominence with the United Irish, mostly Catholic, rebels. Avoiding pitched battles, Holt led a fierce campaign of raids and ambushes against loyalist military targets in Wicklow, striking at will and reducing government influence in the county to urban strongholds. The defeat of the County Wexford rebels at Vinegar Hill on 21 June saw surviving rebel factions heading towards the Wicklow Mountains to link up with Holt's forces.

Emerging to meet them, Holt was given much of the credit for the planning of the ambush and defeat of a pursuing force of 200 British cavalry at Ballyellis on 30 June 1798. However, the subsequent Midlands campaign to revive the rebellion was a disaster, and Holt was lucky to escape with his life back to the safety of the Wicklow Mountains.

Holt rallied the remaining rebels and continued his United Irish guerrilla campaign as before allegedly even solving gunpowder shortages by inventing his own concoction known as 'Holt's Mixture'. Eluding a number of large-scale sweeps into the mountains by the army following the collapse of the rising, Holt together with his younger rebel Captain Michael Dwyer, tied down thousands of troops and his forces were augmented by a steady supply of recruits, a significant proportion of whom were deserters from the militia.

== Surrender ==
Holt had largely held out in expectation of the arrival of French aid but news of the defeat of the French at the Ballinamuck together with his ill health brought about by the hardships of his fugitive life, age and family considerations prompted Holt to initiate contact through intermediaries as his wife, Hester Long's sister worked at Powerscourt for Lord Richard Wingfield, 4th Viscount Powerscourt with the Dublin Castle authorities with a view to a negotiated surrender. Dublin Castle was eager to end the rebellion in Wicklow and allow him exile without trial to New South Wales, after incarceration in the Bermingham Tower. Bank of Ireland Peter La Touche paid for the passage of Holt's pregnant wife and firstborn son Joshua, and for their daughter Maryanne to be educated in Ireland.

== Transportation ==
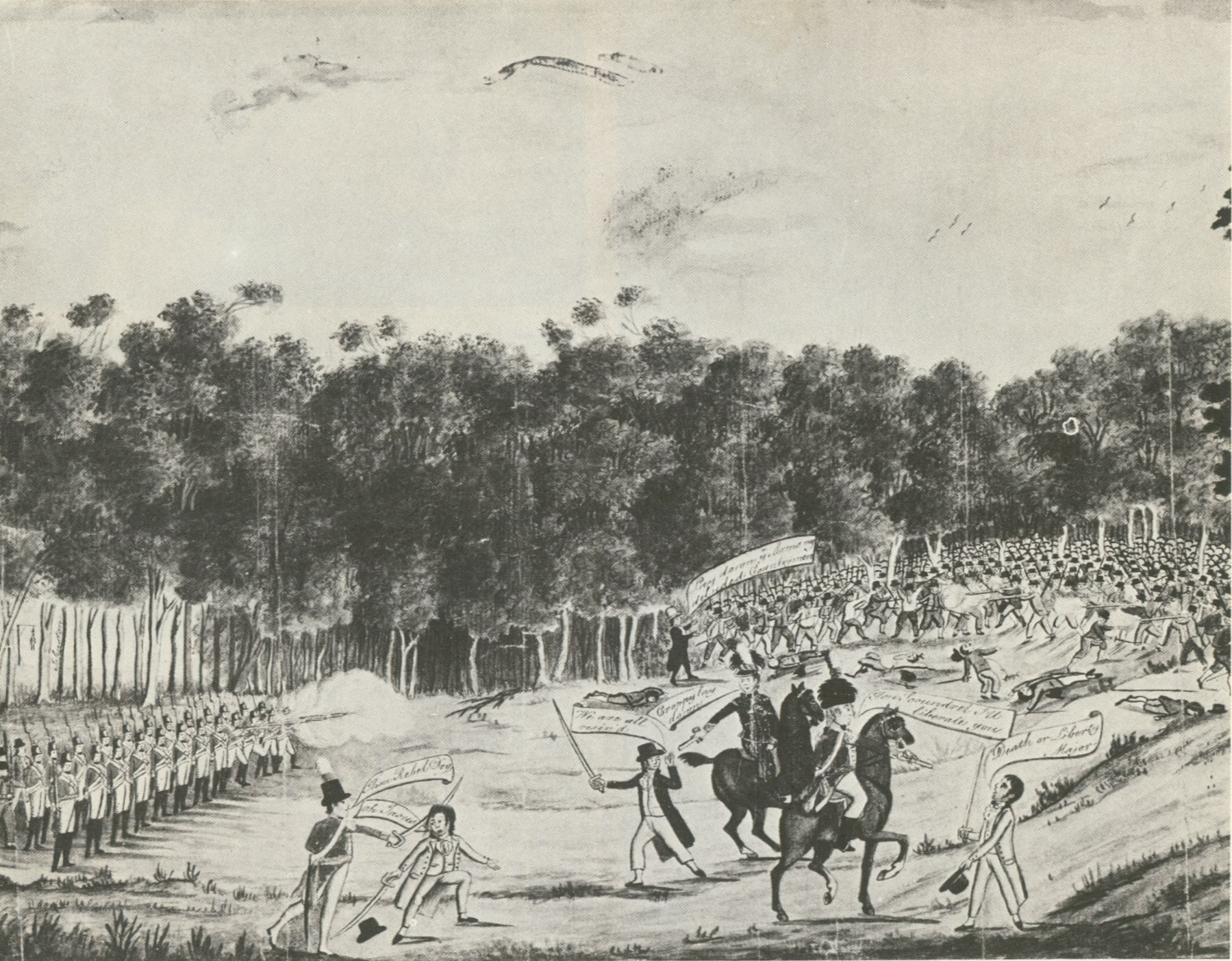
Castle Hill rebellion 1804

In 1804 when the Castle Hill uprising occurred Holt, who was not involved, had been warned that evening that it was about to happen. During the night he set up a defense of Captain Cox's house. He was nonetheless afterwards hounded by Governor King and many false witnesses brought against him. Although there was no plausible evidence at all against him, he was in April 1804 exiled by King to Norfolk Island, and there put to hard labour. In his Memoirs, Holt wrote a considerable amount on the horrors he saw at Norfolk Island under Commandant Joseph Foveaux. Whereas other histories merely describe Foveaux as some able and efficient administrator who became Lieutenant-Governor at Norfolk Island, Holt saw him far less blandly than that. Holt graphically described Foveaux as the greatest tyrant that he (Holt) had ever known. Holt described the joy of the inhabitants of Norfolk Island on the day when Foveaux departed. He wrote in his Memoirs (Edited by Croker, 1838): "If I could have bought or borrowed a pistol, the world, I think, would soon have been rid of this man-killer, Foveaux, and with as short a warning as he gave to the two men he hung without trial."

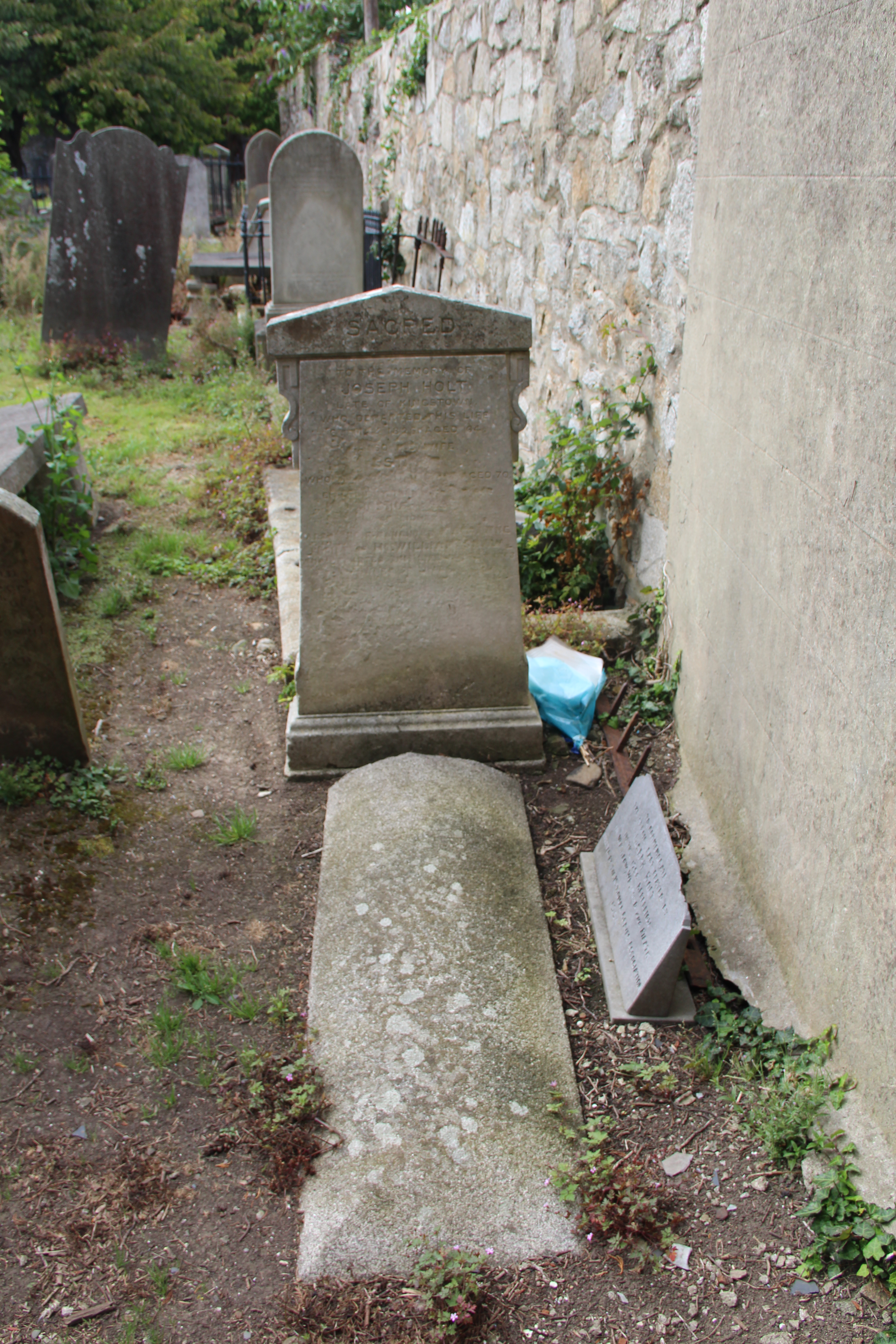
Grave of United Irishman Joseph Holt (1756–1826), Carrickbrennan Cemetery, Monkstown, Co. Dublin.

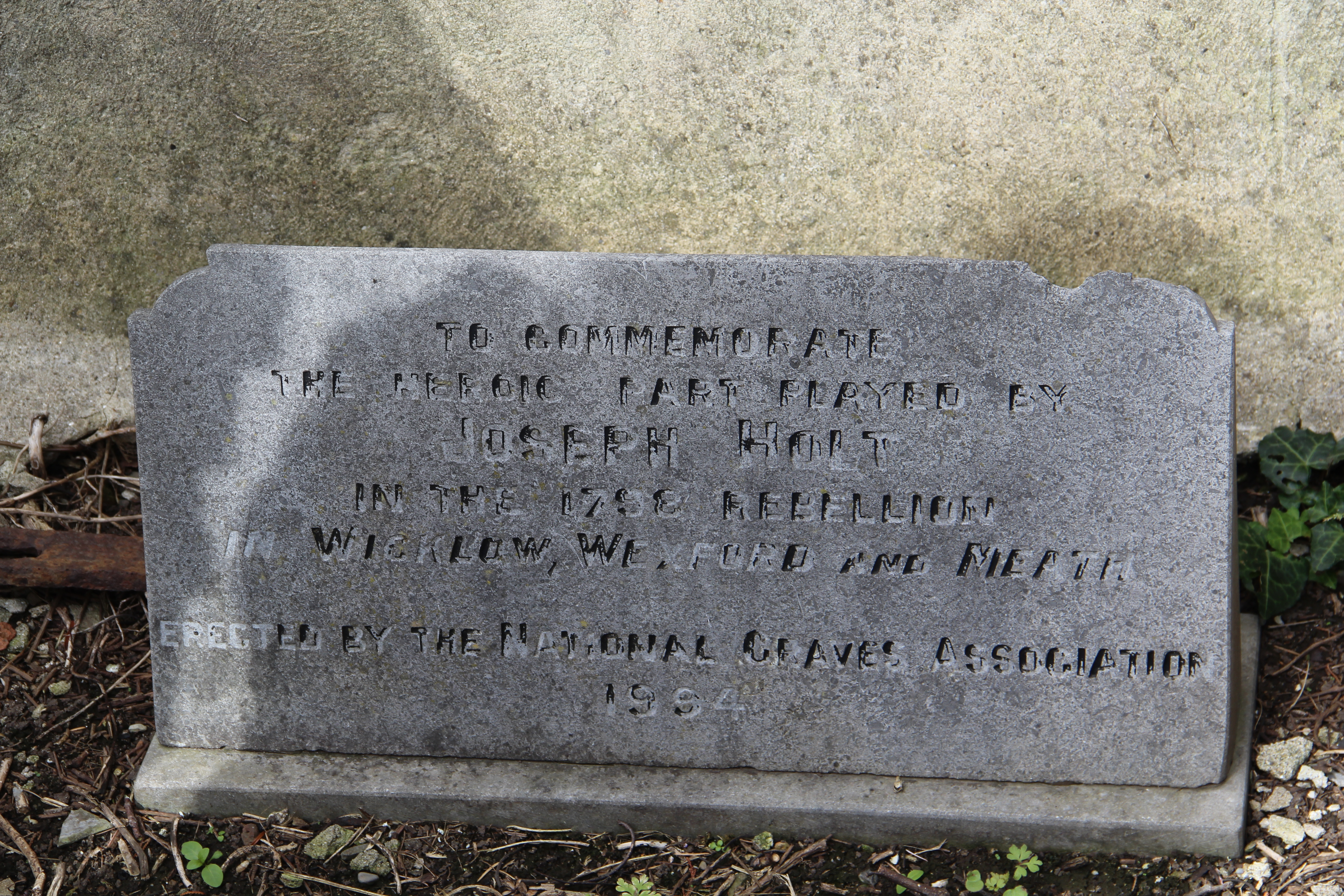
1994 memorial erected at the grave of United Irishman Joseph Holt (1756–1826), Carrickbrennan Cemetery, Monkstown, Co. Dublin.

== Pardon ==
also on board was Henry Browne Hayes. The ship was wrecked by a reef so the passengers and crew were landed at Speedwell Island, one of the Falkland Islands.

== Death ==
He died at Kingstown (now Dún Laoghaire) near Dublin on 16 May 1826 and is buried in Carrickbrennan Churchyard at Monkstown. His elder son Joshua Holt married and remained in New South Wales, and the younger son Joseph Harrison Holt also went there via the United States after his father's 1826 death.

== Sources and further reading ==
- A Rum Story – The adventures of Joseph Holt – thirteen years in New South Wales. Edited by Peter O'Shaughnessy. Kangaroo Press, 1988
- Rebellion in Wicklow: General Joseph Holt's personal account of 1798. Edited by Peter O' Shaughnessy. Four Courts Press, Dublin 1998.
- The Year of Liberty: the great Irish rebellion of 1798. Thomas Pakenham. Granada 1982.
- Memoirs of Joseph Holt, General of the Irish Rebels in 1798, vols 1–2. T. C. Croker (editor), London, 1838.
- 'Keeping up the flame' General Joseph Holt. Ruan O' Donnell. History Ireland. Vol. 6. No. 2. 1998.
- Papers of Peter O'Shaughnessy, National Library of Australia.
