= Gibbet Rath executions =

Mass execution of rebels during the Irish Rebellion of 1798

Gibbet Rath massacre/executions
- Part of the Irish Rebellion of 1798
- Gibbet Rath executions (Ireland)
- Location: 53.152197°N 6.859748°W; Gibbet Rath, Curragh, County Kildare
- Date: 29 May 1798; Morning
- Attack type: Summary execution of prisoners of war
- Deaths: 300–500
- Perpetrators: Militia, dragoons and yeomanry under the command of Sir James Duff

The Gibbet Rath executions /ˈdʒɪbət ræθ/, sometimes called the Gibbet Rath massacre, refers to the execution of several hundred surrendering rebels by government forces during the Irish Rebellion of 1798 at the Curragh of Kildare on 29 May 1798.

== Background ==
News of the outbreak of the rebellion had prompted Major-General Sir James Duff, Military Commander in Limerick, to gather a force of about 600 men, mainly Dublin militia members, backed up by seven artillery pieces, and set out on a forced march to Dublin on 27 May. His twin objectives were to restore communications between the two cities and to crush any resistance encountered on the way. As the soldiers entered County Kildare, they discovered the bodies of several rebel victims, among them Lieutenant William Giffard, the son of the commander of the Dublin militia, Captain John Giffard, which reportedly inflamed the soldiers.

However, by the time Duff's column arrived in Monasterevin in County Kildare, at 7.00 a.m. on 29 May, the bulk of the rebel forces had already accepted a government amnesty from Generals Gerard Lake and Ralph Dundas, following their defeat at the battle of Kilcullen and had surrendered at Knockaulin Hill, several kilometres to the east of the Curragh on 27 May. Not aware that the rebels were gathering to surrender on the Curragh plain, Duff reinforced his column and marched to the nearby town of Kildare, and on to the adjacent southwest corner of the Curragh.

== Massacre ==
Duff's force had by now grown to 700 militia, dragoons and yeomanry with four pieces of artillery (three having been presumably left at Monasterevin). The designated place of surrender, the ancient fort of Gibbet Rath, was a wide expanse of plain with little or no cover for several kilometres around but neither the rebels nor Duff's force had seemingly any reason to fear treachery as a separate peaceful surrender to General Dundas at Knockaulin Hill, who was accompanied only by two dragoons, had been successfully accomplished without bloodshed.

By the time of Duff's arrival at Gibbet Rath on the morning of 29 May, an army of between 1,000 and 2,000 rebels was waiting to surrender in return for the promised amnesty. They were subjected to an angry tirade for their treason by Duff who ordered them to kneel for pardon and then to stack their arms. Shortly after the weapons were stacked an infantry and cavalry assault resulted in the death of about 350 men. Accounts of why the massacre began differ. Rebel claims that Duff ordered his troops to attack the disarmed and surrounded men were denied by Duff himself who claimed that the rebels fired on his men, while another source recorded “one man in the crowd, saying he would not hand over his fire-lock loaded, blazed it off in the air”.

However, Duff redrafted his own official report of the engagement before submission to Dublin Castle, his final draft was transmitted without references to his knowledge of the surrender preparations. The original report read as follows with the items in brackets excised from his final report;

"My Dear Genl. (I have witnessed a melancholy scene) We found the Rebels retiring from this Town on our arrival armed. We followed them with Dragoons; I sent on some of the Yeomen to tell them, on laying down their arms, they should not be hurt. Unfortunately some of them Fired on the Troops; from that moment they were attacked on all sides, nothing could stop the Rage of the Troops. I believe from Two to Three hundred of the Rebels were killed. (They intended, we are told, to lay down their arms to General Dundas). We have 3 men killed & several wounded. I am too fatigued to enlarge. I have forwarded the mails to Dublin."

The grieving Captain John Giffard expressed his own satisfaction as follows;

"My troops did not leave my hero unavenged – 500 rebels bleaching on the Curragh of Kildare—that Curragh over which my sweet innocent girls walked with me last Summer, that Curragh was strewed with the vile carcasses of popish rebels and the accursed town of Kildare has been reduced to a heap of ashes by our hands."

== Aftermath ==
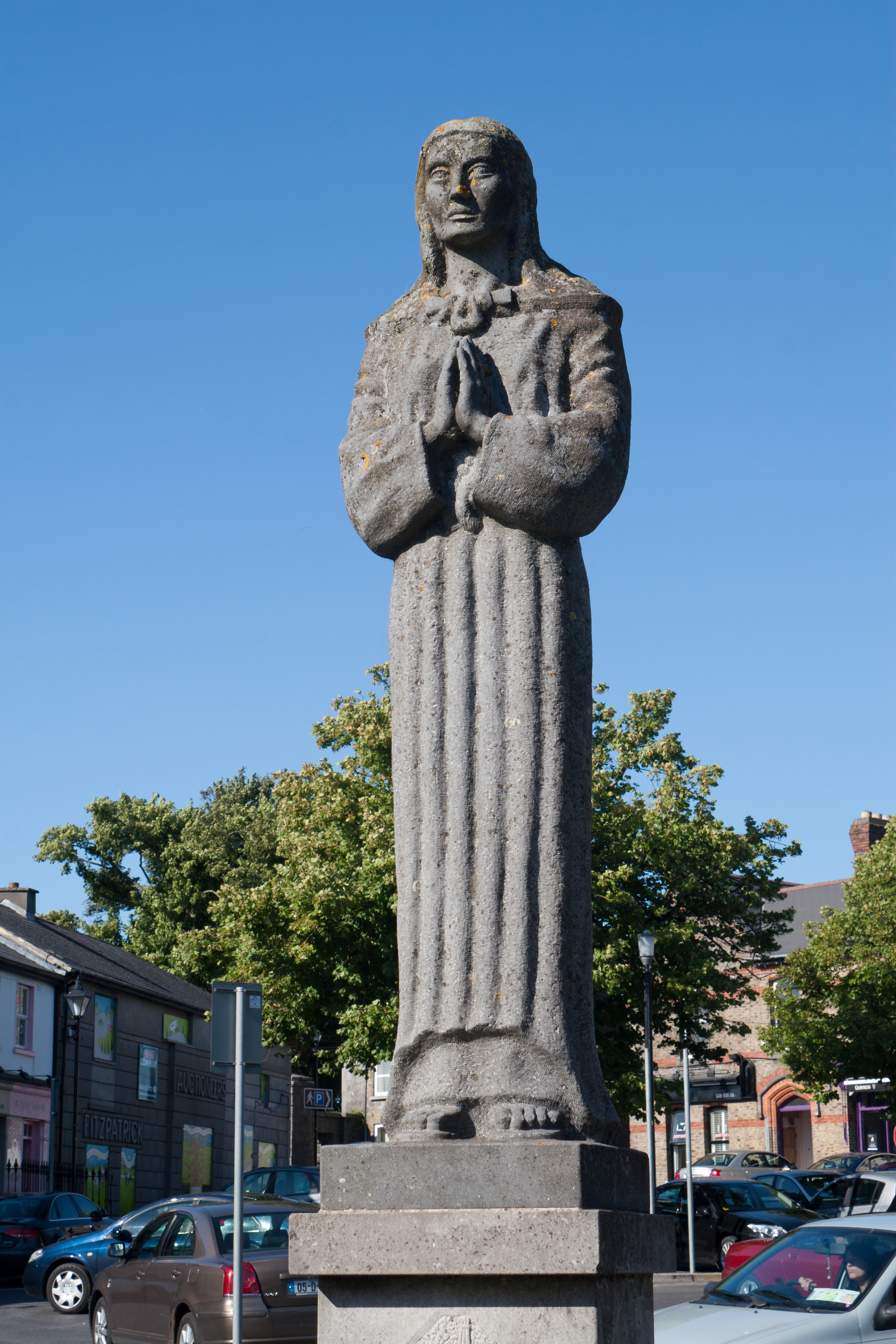
The statue of Saint Brigid at the Market Square of Kildare is dedicated to the memory of the victims at Gibbet Rath

General Duff received no censure for the massacre and, upon his arrival in Dublin the following day, was feted as a hero by the population who honoured him with a victory parade. General Dundas, by contrast, was denounced for having shown clemency towards the rebels. However, because of the massacre, wavering rebels were discouraged from surrendering and there were no further capitulations in county Kildare until the final surrender of William Aylmer in July. Dr Chambers (see below) considers that Lake and Duff were not in communication about the surrenders, being on opposite sides of the Curragh. Duff and his 500 men had arrived in Kildare town after a forced march from Limerick and found it sacked by the rebels, along with the piked body of Duff's nephew.

Duff was later involved in an unsuccessful campaign after the battle of Vinegar Hill to trap and destroy a surviving rebel column in Wexford led by Anthony Perry who fought and eluded Duff's forces at the battle of Ballygullen/Whiteheaps on 5 July.

== Sources ==
- "The Year of Liberty" (1969) by Thomas Pakenham; ISBN 0-349-11252-5
- "All that delirium of the brave – Kildare in 1798" (1998) by Mario Corrigan; OCLC 38331826
