= History of County Wexford =

History of County Wexford, Ireland

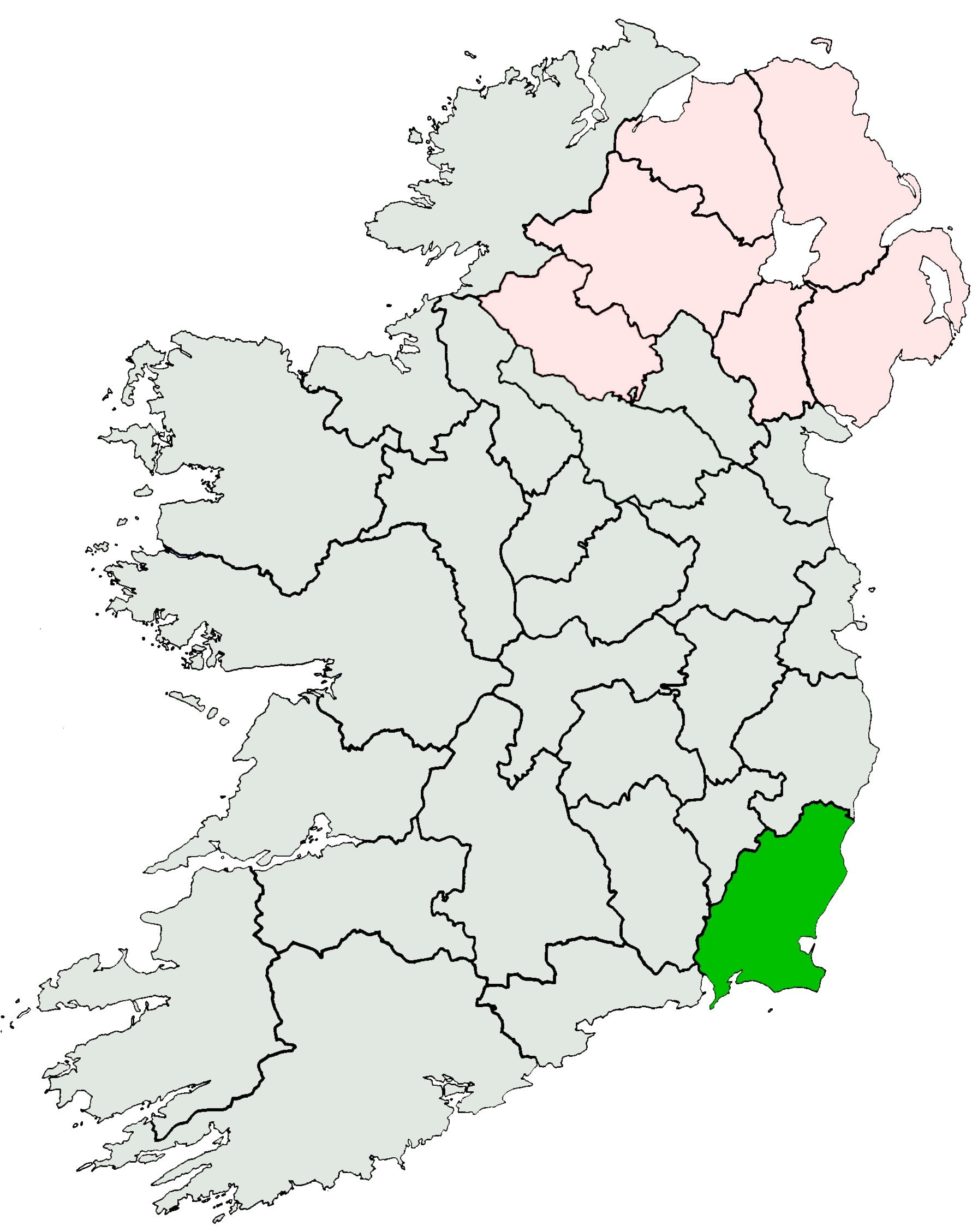
County Wexford highlighted in green

County Wexford (Irish: Contae Loch Garman) is a county located in the south-east of Ireland, in the province of Leinster. It takes its name from the principal town, Wexford, named 'Waesfjord' by the Vikings – meaning 'inlet (fjord) of the mud-flats' in the Old Norse language. In pre-Norman times it was part of the Kingdom of Uí Cheinnselaig, with its capital at Ferns.

The county was formed in Norman times. It was created in 1210 by King John during his visit to Ireland.

== Pre-history ==
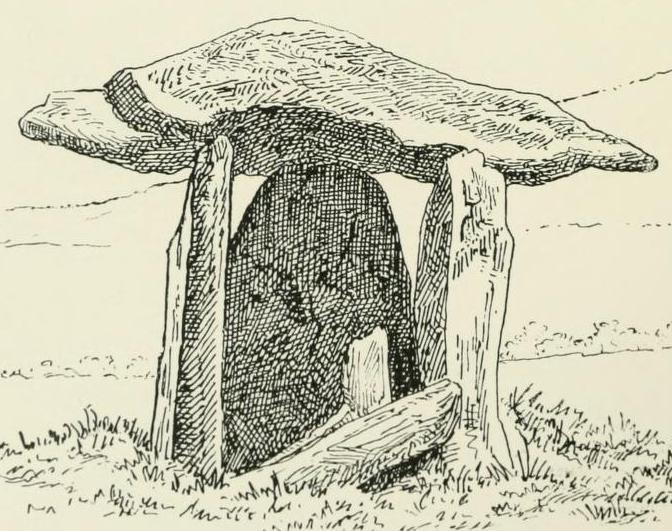
Bree Portal tomb.

Evidence of early human habitation of County Wexford is widespread.

Ireland was inhabited sometime shortly after the ending of the Last ice age, approximately 10,000 – 8000 BC Conservative estimates place the arrival of the first humans in County Wexford as occurring between 5000 BC – 3000 BC, referred to as the Mesolithic period in Ireland, though they may have arrived slightly earlier. Its proximity to Britain and Europe means that County Wexford was probably one of the earliest areas of Ireland to be inhabited by humans. Evidence of this period is scarce, and much remains to be discovered through archaeology and research.

Cinerary Urn from Late Bronze Age, found near Gorey.

Portal tombs (sometimes called Dolmens) exist at Ballybrittas (on Bree Hill) and at Newbawn – and date from the Neolithic period.

Evidence of the Bronze Age period is far more widespread – an early Bronze Age axehead was found at Bree and a gold disc at Kilmuckridge, for example. Cist burials (also dating from the Bronze Age period) have been discovered in many locations – such as at the Deeps, Enniscorthy, and Misterin. There are also numerous standing stones in the county and one stone circle (at Robinstown Great – classified as a four poster monument).

The remains of numerous raths are scattered throughout rural County Wexford. An ogham stone was found on the Hook Peninsula in the 19th century. Ogham stones have also been found elsewhere in the county. Pre-Christian Ireland worshipped a variety of deities, including the sun. Druidism survived in Ireland much longer than Britain and Gaul, as Ireland was never conquered by the Romans.

== Classical references ==
South-Eastern Ireland – based on Ptolemy's Map of Ireland – circa AD 150

On Ptolemy's mid-2nd century 'Map' of Ireland – dating from c. AD 150 – Carnsore point appears as Hieron, the Sacred Cape, the river Barrow as the Birgos (or Birgus), most of the area of County Wexford is shown as inhabited by a tribe called the Brigantes, and a tribe called the Coriondi (or Koriondoi) are shown as occupying north County Wexford.

Some authorities also equate the town named Menapia (or Manapia) as Wexford town – others place it further north along the east coast, roughly near Wicklow town. A river called the Modonnu(s), whose estuary is near Menapia, is often said to be the Slaney – others think it is the Avoca river. It is because the Slaney is the only major river in the south-east that many as a result think that it is the Modonnu(s) river, thereby making Menapia equal to Wexford town (this theory only seems to work if Hook Head is made Hieron). Most authorities seem to agree that Menapia is not Wexford, but is a town located further north along the coast. However, this is not certain.

The Roman historian Tacitus in his Life of Agricola, states that the Brigantes tribe was the most populous tribe in Britain in the mid-1st century AD, who then occupied almost all of northern England. Nevertheless, the Irish and English Brigantes tribes may or may not be related – as unconnected Celtic names were often similar.

Tacitus also states, referring to AD 82, that many of Ireland's "approaches and harbours have become better known from merchants who trade there." This almost certainly means that Roman traders from Britain were trading in some of County Wexford's ports at that time.

== Gaelic tribes (or clans) ==
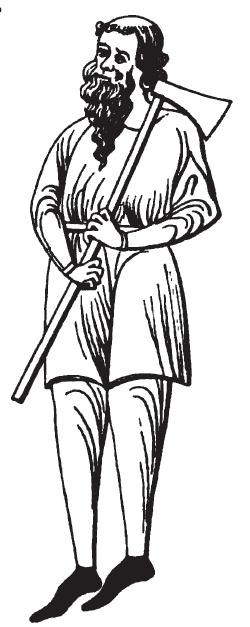
Dermot MacMurrough – last true King of Uí Cheinnsealaig and last Irish King of Leinster.

The Uí Cheinnselaig are believed to have arrived in southern Leinster (from the west, probably through the Pass of Gowran, from Ossory) in the 5th century, first establishing themselves in County Carlow (their main base there was at Rathvilly) and then some time afterwards gaining a foothold in County Wexford. Prior to their arrival the Uí Bairrche are believed to have been the dominant tribe in the region. By the mid-8th century the Uí Cheinnselaig had established their main base at Ferns.

The name Uí Cheinnselaig derives from Énna Cennsalach (in English, Enna Kinsella), King of Leinster in the early 5th century, of whom the tribe were descendants. Énna Cennsalach claimed descent from Cathair Mór, said to have been High King of Ireland in the 2nd century AD, and historically this seems fairly plausible. Cathair Mór was said to have descended from Labhraidh Loingseach, also said by some to have been a much earlier High King of Ireland – this is less certain, however, as at this point history and legend become intertwined.

A famous early King of Uí Cheinnselaig was Brandub mac Echach, who defeated the High King of Ireland at the battle of Dún Bolg, AD 598, thereby halting Uí Néill expansion into Leinster.

Early Irish tribes, forming the Kingdom of Uí Cheinnselaig (named after the dominant and ruling tribe), included the Beanntraige, Uí Dego, Sil mBrain, Uí Bairrche, Fotharta Mara, and the Síl Maíluidir. This list dates from c. AD 900. The area forming the Kingdom of Uí Cheinnselaig was slightly larger than the modern County Wexford.

Common Irish surnames with their origin in the county include Kinsella, Cosgrave, Murphy and Larkin.

== Coming of Christianity ==
Celtic Cross slab at Ferns.

The county was one of the earliest areas of Ireland to be Christianised, under Palladius (who preceded Saint Patrick) in the early 5th century. Prosper of Aquitaine in his Chronicle states that Palladius was sent to the Irish "believing in Christ" as their first bishop, AD 431. This means there were some Christians in Ireland already – before the arrival of Palladius. Ibar and Kierán are often mentioned as possible predecessors of Palladius.

Early churches and monasteries were located at Begerin (formerly an island in Wexford harbour before its reclamation), Taghmon, Adamstown, Camross, Ardlathran, Ferns, Templeshanbo, New Ross, Clonmore, Templeshannon, Donaghmore, St. Kearns, and on the Hook Peninsula. Early missionaries included Ibar, Aidan (Maodhóg or Mogue), Fintan (or Munna, or Munnu), Senan, Abban, Evin, Kierán, and Dubhan.

Aidan (Maodhóg or Mogue) was the first Bishop of the Diocese of Ferns. The Diocese of Ferns was created AD 598, the same year that Aidan was consecrated Bishop. He died AD 632.

The boundaries of the Diocese of Ferns were set at the Synod of Rathbreasail in 1118 – its territory roughly corresponded to that of the Kingdom of Uí Cheinnsealaig as it existed at that time. Grattan Flood, in his History of the Diocese of Ferns, states that at Rathbreasail, the Diocese of Ferns was mapped out as "from Begerin to Mileadhach, on the west of the Barrow; and from Sliabh Uidhe Laighean south to the sea."

== Vikings ==
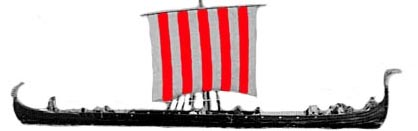
Model of a typical Viking longship

From 819 onwards, the Vikings plundered many Christian sites in the county and Wexford town became a Viking settlement.

The first recorded raid by the Vikings in County Wexford occurred in 819, when Begerin and Camhain's Oak Island (Dairinis Caemhain) in Wexford Harbour were plundered by them. In 835 Ferns was plundered and in 839 it was burned by them.

At least as early as 888, the Vikings had established a settlement of some sort at Wexford, and they fought a battle that year in which they were defeated.

In 917 Ferns and Taghmon were plundered by them. In 919 Ferns was again burned by them. In 919 "the foreigners of Loch Garman" are again mentioned, and again in 1088.

There had been a settlement named Loch Garman at Wexford town prior to their arrival and the Vikings' new settlement was initially a separate one. Initially it would have been a Longphort, over time becoming more permanent – and was called Waesfjord. Eventually the two settlements became one. The name Waesfjord became Wexford, and gave its name to the town. There are many Norse placenames in the county – for example, Saltee islands and Selskar.

== Arrival of the Normans ==
Wexford was the site of an invasion by Normans in 1169 at the behest of Diarmuid Mac Murrough, King of Uí Cheinnsealaig and King of Leinster (Laigin), which led to the subsequent colonisation of the country by the Anglo-Normans.

Áed Ua Crimthainn writing three years earlier, in 1166, wrote the following in the Book of Leinster regarding Diarmuid's (or Diarmait's) expulsion:

O King of Heaven, dreadful is the deed that has been perpetrated in Ireland today [i.e. the kalends of August], namely Diarmait son of Donnchad Mac Murchada, King of Leinster and the Foreigners [i.e. Dublin Danes (Vikings)] has been banished over the sea by the men of Ireland. Alas, alas, O Lord what shall I do?

Diarmait enlisted help abroad and received it principally in Wales. In 1169, a group of Normans commanded by Robert Fitz-Stephen landed near Bannow in three ships (at Bannow Island, since joined to the mainland by the process of silting).

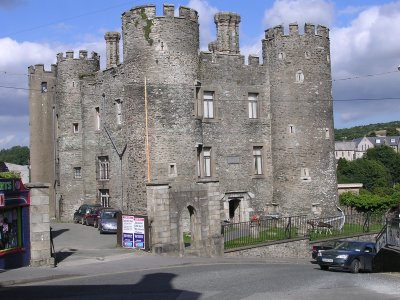
Enniscorthy Castle, County Wexford.

Diarmait himself had returned to Ireland shortly before this, possibly as early as August 1167, with a small force – that included Richard FitzGodebert, and a small number of Knights and Archers. Another force under Raymond le Gros landed at Baginbun (then called Dún Domhnaill) in 1170. Mac Murrough died in 1171 and was buried at Ferns. His Kingdom, since regained, passed to Strongbow (Richard de Clare), contrary to Irish custom. Strongbow had married Aoife (or Eva), Diarmait's daughter, in 1170. Strongbow, after first submitting to the King, parcelled out these lands to his followers according to feudal law.

A 1247 list of Knight's fees includes the following names of the new 'owners': de Heddon (Hayden), Howel, de London, de Bosco, Chever (Cheevers), Brun (Browne), Ketting (Keating), Purcell, de Wythay (Whitty), Cod (Codd), de Prendelgast (Prendergast), and de Rupe (Roche) [this is not the full list]. In 1324 the names Deverous (Devereux), le Poeur (Power), Synod (Synott or Sinnott), Hey (Hay or Hayes), and FitzHenry, are also listed – as are many others not included here. Most of these names are still widespread in the County today. Furlong, Sutton, and Lambert were, and are, also prominent Norman names in County Wexford.

Wexford, particularly the baronies of Bargy and Forth, saw one of the most heavy concentrations of medieval English settlements in Ireland. This area was once known as the 'Wexford Pale'. An old dialect of English, known as Yola, was spoken uniquely in Wexford up until the 19th century. The north of the county remained Gaelic Irish in character, predominantly under the control of the MacMurrough Kavanagh clan.

During the Norman period, important towns existed at Bannow and Clonmines. However, these declined in importance over time. The Norman town of Bannow (erroneously thought by some to have been reclaimed by the sea) was gradually abandoned due to the silting up of Bannow Bay, and an early Norman Church can still be seen there today.

== Templars suppressed and the Black Death ==
In 1307 the Knights Templar were suppressed. In County Wexford the Knights were established at one location – on the Hook Peninsula. Their preceptory there, named Kilcloggan, and its lands, which had been granted to them during the reign of Henry II, were confiscated and a few years later, in 1312, they were granted to the Knights Hospitaller – who already had a manor in the county, possibly at Ballyhoge. The Knights Hospitaller had been introduced to the county by Strongbow about 1175. Pope Innocent III confirmed possession of the church of "St. Mary of Slefculture" to the Knights Hospitaller, 1212 (this was located near Slievcoiltia) – a number of other churches in the county (including many in Wexford town) were confirmed to them on the same date. A County Wexford family, of Norman origin, with strong associations with the Knights Hospitaller during their period of existence in the county and in Ireland was the Keatings.

The Black Death ravaged Ireland 1348–49. One of the most vivid accounts of the plague was written by Friar John Clyn at Kilkenny, who thought that all mankind might die. He reports that particularly in the months of September and October, 1348, people came from all over Ireland to St. Mullins, County Carlow, including many no doubt from County Wexford, out of fear, to seek divine protection from the 'pestilence' as he calls it – as it was then very prevalent. He comments on how it was rare for only one member of a family to die, but that usually the entire family was wiped out. John Clyn himself is believed to have died in 1349 from the plague.

== Gaelic resurgence ==
Art MacMurrough Kavanagh and Earl of Gloucester in 1399. The English appear on the left-hand side.

The native Irish began to regain some of their former territories in the 14th century, especially in the north of the county. This was primarily due to Art MacMurrough Kavanagh, who became King of Leinster in 1377. King Richard II led two expeditions against him. Art MacMurrough Kavanagh claimed descent from Diarmuid Mac Murrough (d. 1171), through an illegitimate son of Diarmuid's named Domhnall. Domhnall was said to have been a student at a monastery dedicated to St. Caomhan, near Gorey – hence the name Cavanagh or Kavanagh came to refer to Domhnall and was used by many of his descendants ever since. The main branch of the MacMurrough Kavanaghs later lived at Borris House, Borris, County Carlow.

The Annals of the Four Masters differ as to the date, and the manner, of Art's death, recording it twice. Either entry in the Annals may be correct. They state that Art died in either 1416 or 1417. The date 1417 is the year given by most authors, who generally state that he died at New Ross. He was buried at St. Mullins, County Carlow. His tombstone there states that he died 1417 – however, this was erected long after his death. The Annals of Ulster state that he died 1417, as do the Annals of Loch Cé – however, neither states that he died at New Ross, and the details agree with the 1416 entry in the Annals of the Four Masters, differing only in date.

== 16th century ==
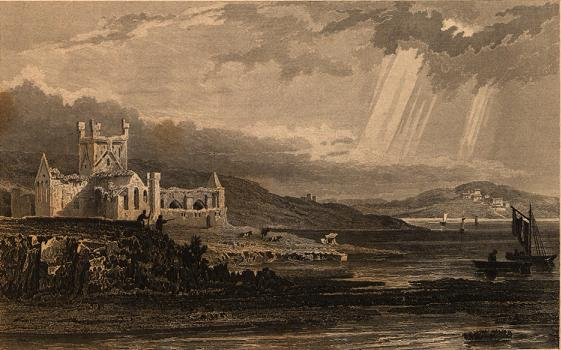
Dunbrody Abbey, County Wexford – A print from an engraved steel plate, dated 1832.

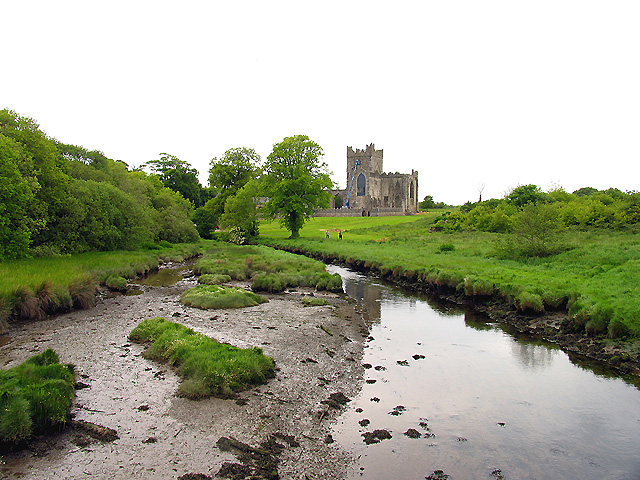
Tintern Abbey, County Wexford.

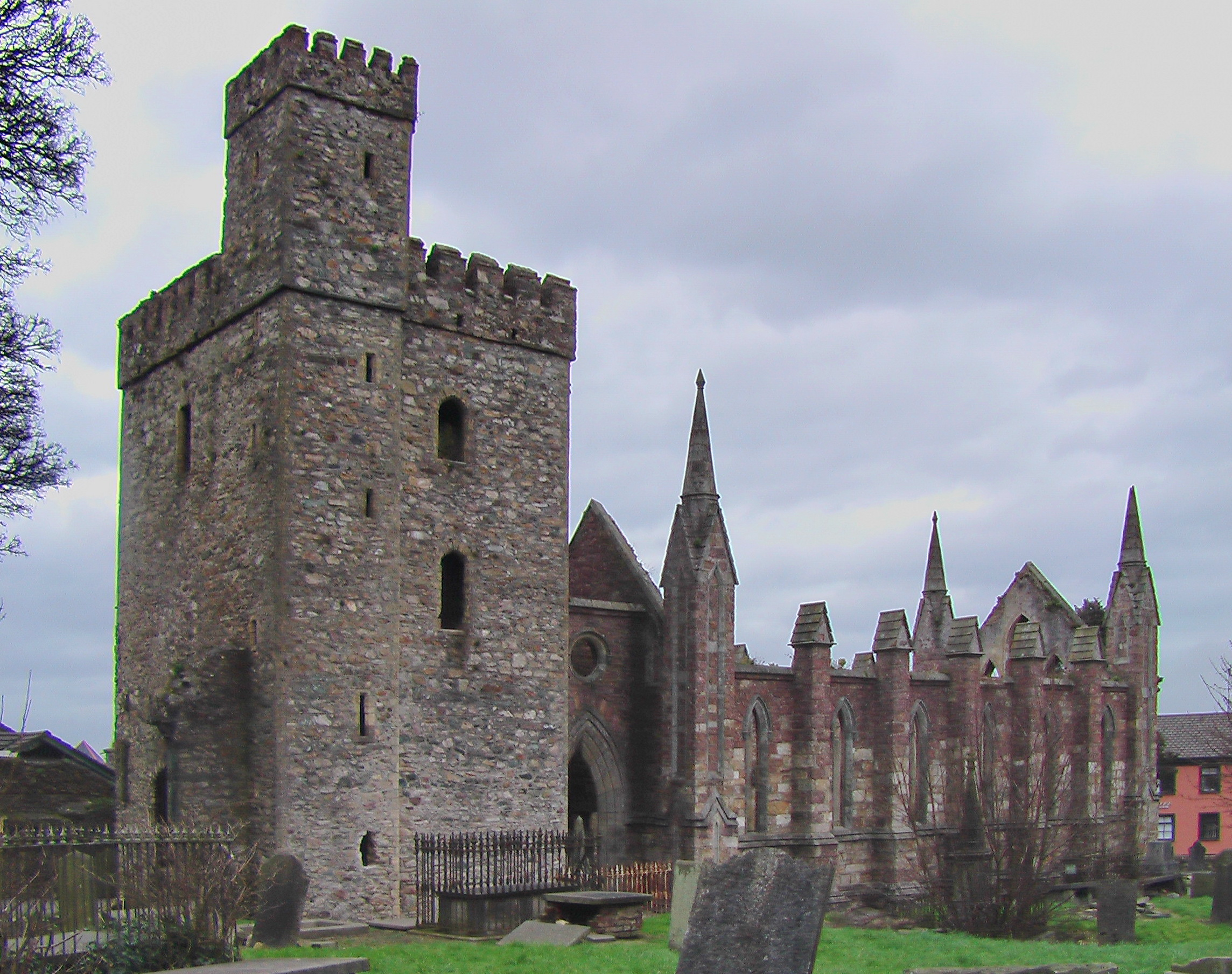
Ruins of Selskar Abbey, Wexford.

Under Henry VIII the great religious houses were dissolved, 1536–41. All their lands and possessions were confiscated and became the King's property, who subsequently granted them to new owners. In County Wexford the following were among the most important of those dissolved:

- Tintern Abbey – a Cistercian foundation. Its possessions were granted to Anthony Colclough in the mid-16th century.
- Dunbrody Abbey – another Cistercian foundation. Its possessions were granted in 1545 to "Osborne Itchingham" (Echingham). In the mid-17th century it passed, through marriage, to Arthur Chichester.
- The Augustinian Priory of Clonmines. In 1546 the silver mines at Clonmines were re-opened and were worked for the state. The rest of the Priory's lands (small in extent) were divided up and passed through several owners over time.
- The Knights Hospitaller's manor of Kilcloggan – became the possession of Dudley Loftus (son of Adam Loftus) near the end of the 16th century.
- Glascarrig Priory.
- Selskar Abbey.

In the Calendar of Carew Manuscripts there is a description of County Wexford in 1596, as follows:

That part of the county north of the river Slane is possessed chiefly by the Irish called the Cavenaghes. "It hath on that north side also many English inhabitants;" sc., Synot of Clelande, Roth of Roth, Synot of Ballynerah in the Murros, Masterson at Fernes Castle (where also the Bishop's see is), Peppard at Glascarrig.

The Irish on that side the Slane are these: Donell Mortagh, Edmund O'Morowe of the O'Morowes' country, and others, "ever bad neighbours and rebellious people, under the government of William Synot, by lease from her Majesty."

"Other Irish nations are by east them to the sea. The countries are called the Kinshelaghes, Kilconelin, Kilhobock, Farinhamon, inhabited by Art McDermot, McDa More, Mc-Vadock, Darby McMorish, all under the government of Mr. Masterson."

On the south-west of the Slane are four English baronies, called Fort, Barge, Shelberre, and Shelmalen, and an Irish barony called the Duffree. The principal men in the English are Browne of Malrancon, Devoureux of Balmagir, Chevers of Ballyhale, Forlong of Horton, FitzHarryes of Kilkevan, [the] Bishop of Fernes, Sir Thomas Colclough of Tyntern, Sir Dudley Losthowse of Kilclogan. In the Durffey dwell Sir Harry Wallop at Iniscorth, Piers Butler, the Viscount Mountgarret.

== 17th-century wars and confiscations ==
A Plantation of English settlers took place, 1612–13, east of the River Slaney in County Wexford. The lands were distributed in pockets over various parts of this large area – roughly 1,000 Irish (or Plantation) acres on average were granted to each individual (though some received more). Some of those granted land were: Francis Annesley, Francis Blundell, Richard Cooke, Lawrence Esmond, Edward Fisher, Adam Loftus, Henry Pierse and George Trevelyan – however, this is just a partial list.

On 23 October 1641, a major Rebellion broke out in Ireland. In 1649, Oliver Cromwell and his English Parliamentarian Army first arrived in County Wexford to deal with the rebels located there. Ferns and Enniscorthy were captured by them near the end of September 1649. Wexford town was sacked by Cromwell and his Army, 11 October 1649 – hundreds of civilians were killed in the process. Cromwell was blamed for the massacre by the people of County Wexford and of Ireland in general. Reports of the numbers killed vary considerably.

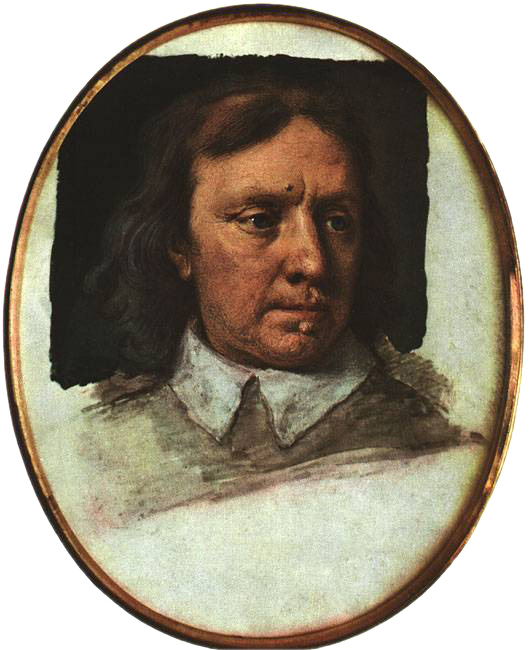
Oliver Cromwell

New Ross, under the command of Lucas Taffe, surrendered to Cromwell 19 October 1649. Taffe and most of the garrison were allowed to march away as part of the terms of surrender. Taffe also wrote to Cromwell requesting "liberty of conscience as such shall stay" However, Cromwell wrote a noteworthy reply, indicative of what was to come in subsequent years:

"For that which you mention concerning liberty of conscience, I meddle not with any man's conscience. But if by liberty of conscience you meane a liberty to exercise the masse, I judge it best to use plaine dealing, and to let you know where the Parliament of England hath power that will not be allowed of."

— Oliver Cromwell, 19 October 1649, "Oliver Cromwell's Letters and Speeches", p. 395.

The capture of Ross meant that all of County Wexford was effectively in Cromwell's hands, with the exception of the Fort of Duncannon – which held out until August 1650, before surrendering.

About 1655 the county was mapped under the Down Survey. The county was also covered by the Civil Survey, which was conducted 1654–56 (but which recorded land ownership in 1640–41). These surveys were conducted to aid the confiscation and re-distribution of lands. The lands of the Irish and Anglo-Normans were confiscated and given to Cromwell's soldiers as payment for their service in the Parliamentarian Army. In other counties Adventurers were allotted lands, but the lands in County Wexford were to go primarily to soldiers. It was only the landowners who were ordered west of the Shannon and who went into exile on the Continent – the ordinary people were allowed to stay on in their homes to serve as tenants for their new landlords. However, many soldiers (though not all) sold their lands almost immediately. Cromwell's death in 1658 meant that some of the grants of land that he had made were cancelled and a small number of the old proprietors were restored to their estates under Charles II. Other beneficiaries were Charles II's supporters, especially those who had helped 'restore' him to the English throne. All this is borne out by the Books of Survey and Distribution. More dispossessions were made when James II was defeated and dethroned, near the end of the 17th century, primarily the lands of his supporters. It was at Duncannon, in the south-west of the county that James II, after his defeat at the Boyne, embarked for Kinsale and then to exile in France.

Also in this century, the first magpies in Ireland were recorded as having appeared in the County of Wexford about 1676. Robert Leigh, of Rosegarland (near Clongeen), writing 1684 states:

About 8 yeares agoe there landed in those parts [the Baronies of Forth and Bargy] a new sort of planters, out of Wales, a parcell of Magpies (forced I suppose by stormey weather), which now breed in severall places in ye Barony of Forth, and at a place called Baldinstowne, in the Barony of Bargy, and in the wood off Rose Garland, before menconed, in ye Barony of Shilmaleere.

Wolves were very common at the time of Cromwell in Ireland. However, government rewards offered to kill them and for their capture meant they became very rare within fifty years and extinct in Ireland before the end of the 18th century. The most reliable evidence suggests that wolves became extinct in County Wexford in the 1730s, and that the last wolf in Ireland was killed near Mount Leinster in County Carlow in 1786.

== The Penal Laws and the 18th century ==
Though there had been many earlier laws enacted against Catholics in Ireland, the year 1695 marked the real beginning of what were called the Penal Laws. These laws primarily discriminated against Catholics, and did not begin to be relaxed until the end of the 18th century.

In late 1709 a number of Protestant families from the Palatinate region of Germany were settled on the lands of Abel Ram of Gorey, a large landowner, at Old Ross and at Gorey. Some of the surnames of these new settlers included names such as Fissel, Hornick, Jekyll, Poole, and Rhinehardt. They had travelled via Rotterdam to London, and arrived at Dublin, 10 September 1709. Another large group were settled at County Limerick, and others were settled elsewhere in Ireland. They are referred to as 'Palatines'.

In 1752, Richard Pococke travelled through a large part of County Wexford and left a written record of his tour.

In the early 1770s, the Whiteboys were briefly active in north-west County Wexford – though they are said to have had little impact on the rest of the county. According to George Taylor they first appeared in County Wexford in 1774 but "they were soon quelled, and two of the ringleaders, named Owen Carroll and John Daggan, were found guilty of some heinous offence, and executed near Newtownbarry, on 28 September 1775." Their chief grievance seems to have been the payment of Tithes – a tax towards the upkeep of the Established Church. The Established Church was Protestant and the Whiteboys were Catholic.

In 1777 there were only three post offices in the county – Gorey, Enniscorthy, and Wexford. The Royal Mail from Dublin entered the county only two days in the week, and returned on each succeeding day.

In 1778, the Colclough family formed the first Volunteer Company in Ireland, at Enniscorthy.

Arthur Young travelled throughout Ireland at this period. His book, A Tour in Ireland, 1776–1779, includes many details on County Wexford – which he visited during that time.

In 1793 a serious 'incident' took place near Wexford town. A large group of people, who had recently joined a secret organization called the Right Boys, from the north-west and west of County Wexford approached the town in an attempt to free two prisoners. On 11 July 1793, a large body of them approached the town – armed with guns, pikes, scythes, and similar weapons. They had a Lieutenant Buckby as their prisoner, who they had captured earlier. At about two o'clock on the same day, the military – the 56th Regiment, commanded by Major Vallotton – were sent out to meet them, "at the sight of which it was imagined they would disperse". They met near John street. A parley was agreed and Valloton stepped forward on his side and the Right Boys sent forward, as their leader, John Moore of Robinstown. For some reason Valloton lost his cool and struck Moore with his sword, wounding him severely. Moore wounded him in the groin with a scythe – Vallotton died a few days later. The soldiers opened fire and the group dispersed – 11 of the protestors were killed on the spot but many more later died from their wounds in the fields around the town (perhaps another 90 or so) – some of these were killed by local militia under the command of James Boyd. Lieutenant Buckby escaped. Moore died that day and was buried at Carnagh. He was only 22 years old. Many of the Right Boys were made prisoners, "five of whom, James Kenney, Patrick Flannery, Patrick Neil, Michael Carty, and John Crawford, were found guilty at the ensuing assizes and executed", 26 July 1793. Valloton had a monument erected to his memory at Wexford town. Within the county this whole affair is sometimes referred to as the 'First Rebellion' (1798 being the second).

The Irish language continued to be spoken in much of County Wexford until about the end of the 18th century, when it began to decline in areas where it was spoken, while Yola, spoken in the baronies of Forth and Bargy, began to decline. By 1850, there were only 800 Irish speakers left in the county and Yola had died out completely, with English dominant.

== The 1798 Rebellion ==
Profile of a pike

County Wexford saw the heaviest fighting of 1798 rebellion was fought, with significant battles at Enniscorthy and New Ross and numerous 1798 memorials are scattered throughout the county. The famous ballad Boolavogue was written in remembrance of the Wexford Rising. Numerous 1798 memorials are scattered throughout the county. The French Revolution was a big influence on many of the rebels who took part and many were also United Irishmen. A common weapon used by the Wexford rebels was the pike, made by local blacksmiths – one modification usually included was a hook, used primarily to cut a horse's reins. The iron or steel spearhead was attached to a long wooden shaft – made of ash. Blacksmiths were especially targeted as suspected United Irishmen prior to the rebellion and type of torture known as pitchcapping was widely employed by government forces (in particular the militia and yeomanry) in County Wexford to obtain information.

The rebellion in Wexford began on the evening of 26 May 1798. All through that night and the morning of 27 May 1798 several incidents took place, the first of which occurred just north of Scarawalsh Bridge, on the River Slaney. The area of countryside around Ferns and Camolin was principally involved in the initial outbreak. Fires were lit on nearby hills (including Carrigrew Hill) this night to signal to those in the surrounding countryside that the Rebellion had commenced. The famous John Murphy, a Catholic priest, emerged as an important Rebel leader at this early stage of the Rebellion.

The Rebels were victorious at the Battle of Oulart Hill on 27 May 1798 and took Enniscorthy the next day, establishing one of their main camps at Vinegar Hill, adjacent to the town where thousands flocked to join the rebellion. On 30 May 1798 the rebels defeated a British force on its way to reinforce the garrison at Wexford town at the Battle of Three Rocks. The government forces stationed in the town Wexford panicked and almost the entire garrison fled by a circuitous route, avoiding the rebels, towards Duncannon Fort. The Rebels entered the town in triumph – now almost all of the county was theirs.

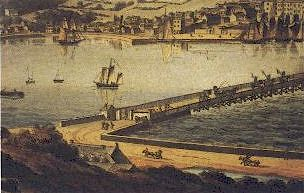
Wexford – circa 1800.

An attempt to spread the rebellion into Carlow led to defeat on 1 June 1798 at the Bunclody (or Newtownbarry) but on 4 June 1798 a British counterattack was repulsed at Battle of Tubberneering and Gorey was taken the same day.

On 5 June 1798, the Rebels fought for ten hours at the Battle of New Ross, but failed to take the town. There was huge loss of life and blood literally ran in the streets. Later that day about 120 loyalist prisoners, were killed at Scullabogue, near the Rebel Camp on Carrigbyrne Hill.

On 9 June 1798, Wexford Rebels, joined by Rebels from County Wicklow, were defeated at the Battle of Arklow, County Wicklow. On 20 June 1798 a number of loyalists were piked to death on Wexford bridge. Also on 20 June 1798 the Rebels were defeated at the Battle of Foulksmills (or Goff's Bridge). At this stage, government forces were now closing in on the Rebels from all sides.

The United Irishmen were defeated at the Battle of Vinegar Hill, 21 June 1798. That was the last major action in County Wexford. However, a detachment of government forces, consisting of Ancient Britons, Fifth Dragoon Guards, Gorey Yeoman Cavalry, Ballaghkeen Yeoman Cavalry, and some supplementary mounted Yeomen, was ambushed and defeated at Ballyellis, County Wexford (near the border with County Wicklow), on 30 June 1798. The number killed was probably around 60 – of whom 25 were Ancient Britons. A number of others were wounded. There were no Rebel casualties. This engagement became known as the Battle of Ballyellis.

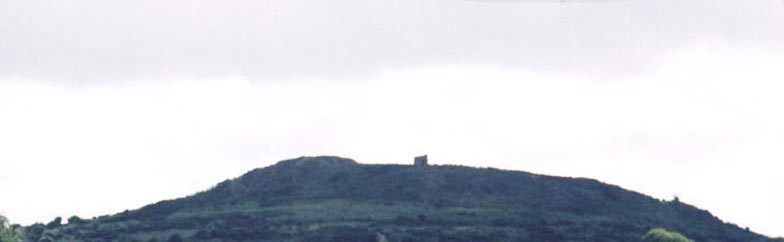
Vinegar Hill – view from Enniscorthy

On the morning of 5 July 1798 the Rebels fought the Army (under James Duff) for two hours at the Battle of Ballygullen (near Craanford), where a large number of Rebels were killed and wounded. This was the last pitched battle of the rebellion in Wexford as the surviving active rebels sought to spread the rebellion by marching towards Ulster and Munster until their defeat on 14 July. Some groups stayed in Wexford carrying on guerrilla warfare with the last faction, led by James Corcoran, surviving until their eventual destruction in February 1804. Others, like Miles Byrne fought on in a different way. After Emmet's failed Rebellion of 1803, in which Byrne was involved, he escaped to France. There he enlisted in the French Army and fought the British in this guise on many subsequent occasions.

== 19th century ==
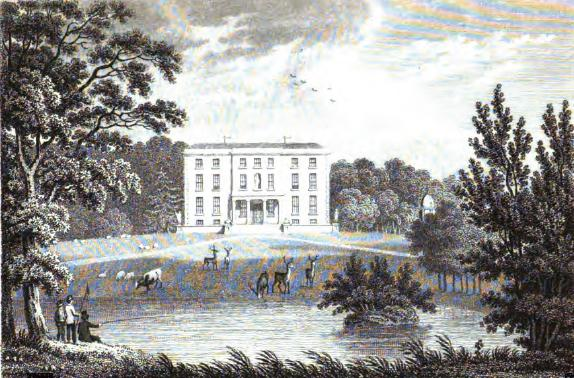
Ballynastragh House, County Wexford – From a drawing published 1826. Home of the Esmonde family.

In 1803, Edward Hay, of Ballinkeele, published one of the first accounts of the 1798 Rebellion, along with a detailed map of the county.

In 1807, a famous duel took place at Ardcandrisk between John Colclough and William Alcock. The main cause was an election that was about to be held – each being opposing candidates. Colclough was killed and a huge crowd subsequently attended his funeral at Tintern Abbey. This was mainly because the Colcloughs were generally popular and considered liberal landlords and also because Colclough was the people's candidate. The Colclough family had been granted the former Abbey (part of which they used as a dwelling) and its extensive lands in the mid-16th century.

In 1811, Valentine Gill published his map of the county. He published another edition in 1816. He was a brother of John Gill, killed on Vinegar Hill during the 1798 Rebellion.

Edward Hay, of Ballinkeele, died at Dublin, 1826.

Many areas of the county were very much involved in the Tithe War (1831–36). This can be seen from the many people, from many areas of the county, included in the lists of those who refused to pay tithes, known as the Tithe Defaulter Schedules. County Wexford wasn't as badly affected as some other areas by the Famine in the 1840s, but it still had a major impact on the county.

Nicholas Furlong, illustrating the effects of the Famine, states "In 1841 the population of County Wexford was 202,033. In 1851 it was 180,158, a drop of 21,875. The population continued to decline for the rest of the century."

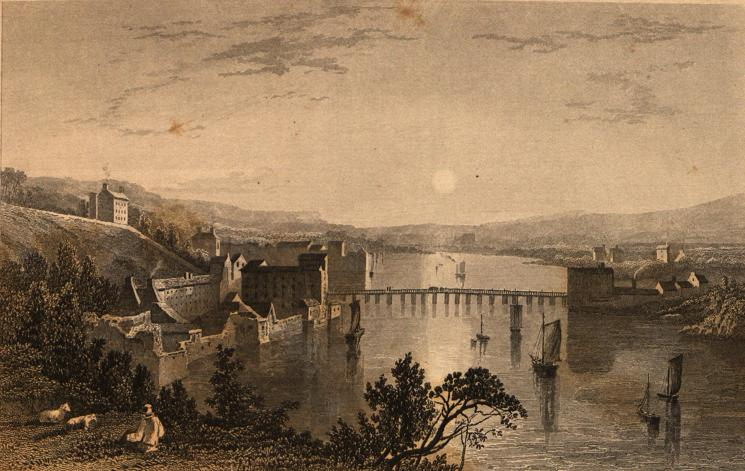
New Ross, County Wexford – A print from an engraved steel plate, dated 1832.

Griffiths' Valuation for County Wexford was published in 1853 – it now serves as an important Census substitute, as almost all the 19th century Census returns have since been destroyed.

Newspapers became widespread in this century – for example, the Wexford People began around 1853.

In 1859 the Pomona, an emigrant ship, sank off the Wexford coast and all on board were killed – estimated at 400 people.

In the mid-19th century many of the county's towns received gas lighting for the first time – Enniscorthy, for example, around the 1850-60s. The 19th century also saw the arrival of the Railways in the county.

The Bridge at New Ross, over the River Barrow, was carried away by a flood and a great flow of ice, 1867.

Later in the 19th century, the Land War had a widespread impact on the county. A large number of tenants were famously evicted at Coolgreany, 1887.

== 20th century to present ==
The first fully surviving Census of Population for County Wexford dates from 1901.

In the early decades of the 20th century, many people from County Wexford emigrated to the United States – most travelled from Cobh (then called Queenstown), County Cork, via passenger ship to Ellis Island, New York. Some remained in the US, but many others later returned home.

=== County Wexford (1914–1923) ===
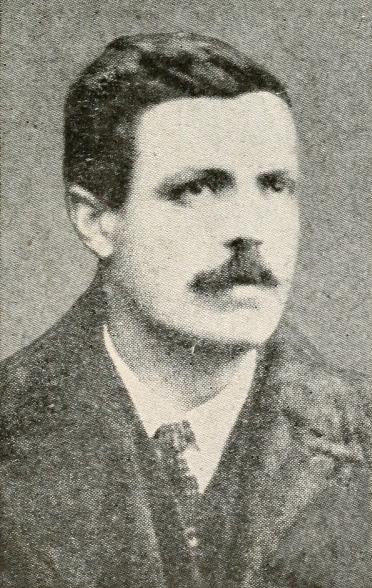
Michael O'Hanrahan.

John Redmond.

In 1916, a small Rebellion occurred at Enniscorthy on cue with that at Dublin. On Thursday, 27 April 1916, Enniscorthy town was taken over by about 600 armed rebels. The government responded by sending a force of more than 1,000 men to retake Enniscorthy. On Monday, 1 May 1916, the Enniscorthy rebels surrendered unconditionally. There had been no fatalities and relatively little damage to property. Some of the leaders were sentenced to death, but all had their sentences commuted. Furlong and Hayes state, "270 were arrested, of whom 150 were interned at Frongoch in north Wales". Frongoch internment camp, three miles from the town of Bala in Merionethshire, North Wales.

Michael O'Hanrahan of New Ross, who played a prominent role in the Easter Rising at Dublin, was executed 4 May 1916 at Dublin.

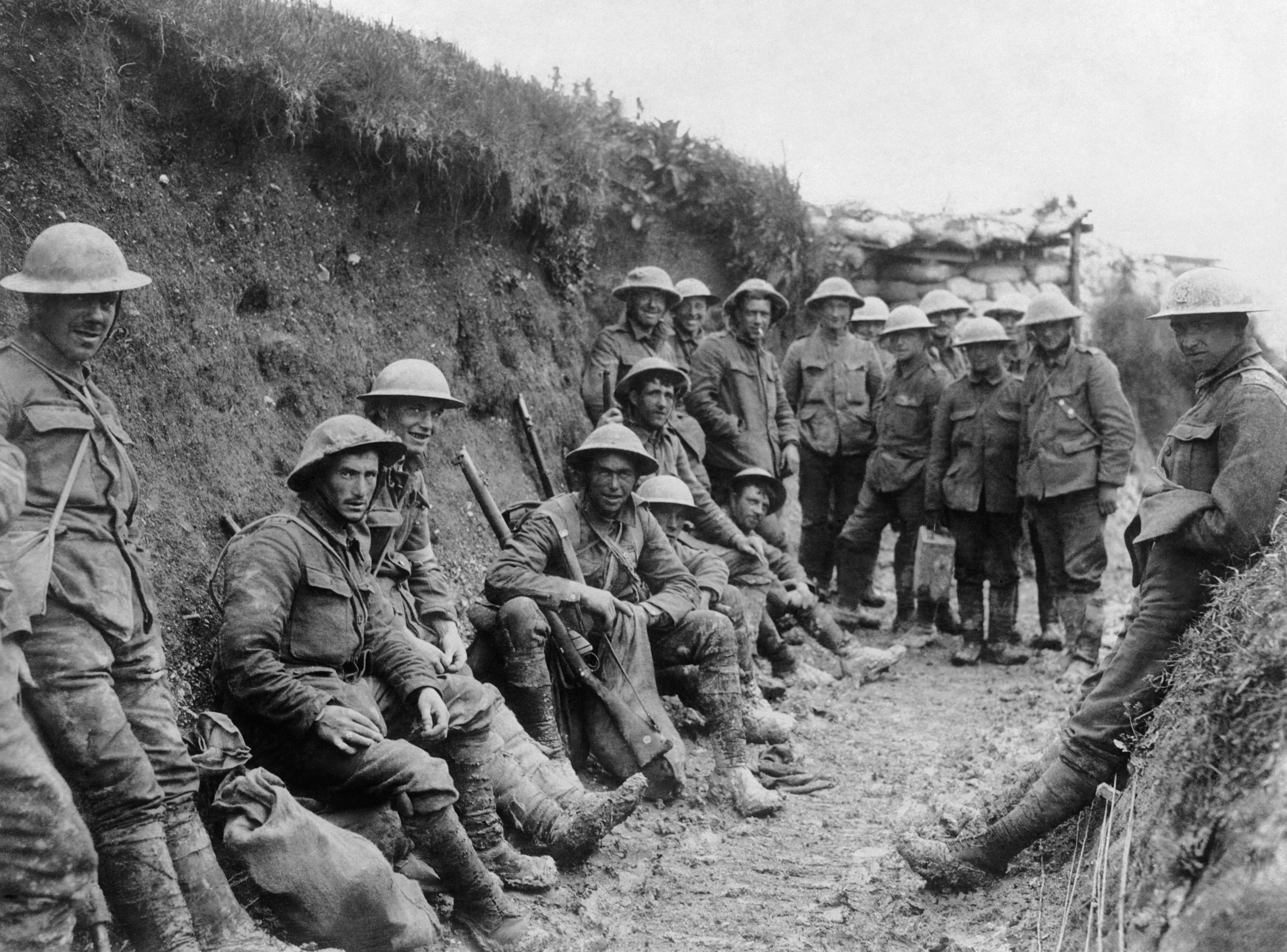
In the trenches: Royal Irish Rifles in a communications trench on the first day on the Somme, 1 July 1916. Many men from County Wexford belonged to this Regiment.

During World War I, at least 504 men from County Wexford, who were enlisted in the British Army, died fighting in the land War. German U-boats were very active off Wexford's southern coast during the War. Zeppelins were based at Johnstown Castle, and used to deal with the U-boat threat. The first US Naval Aviation Forces to arrive were eight men under Radio Officer Charles A (Gunner) Rogers on 25 February 1918. The US Naval Air Station Wexford received the Curtiss H-16s seaplanes on 18 September 1918. One famous U-boat that operated off Wexford's coasts was U-20, commanded by Walther Schwieger. On 6 May 1915 it torpedoed and sunk both SS Centurion and SS Candidate off the south Wexford coast, but the crews were unharmed. The next day, this same U-boat torpedoed and sunk RMS Lusitania, a large passenger liner, off the coast of County Cork. The main shipping route between Britain and America passed through Wexford coastal waters. Britain was incredibly dependent on this route for supplies. A huge number of ships were sunk off Wexford's coasts during the War. The area of sea around Tuskar Rock came to be referred to as "The Graveyard" – the graveyard of Allied ships. A number of German U-boats were also sunk in Wexford coastal waters. One of these was UC-44, sunk off the Hook Peninsula on 4 August 1917 by a mine. The only survivor was the U-boat's commander. The rest of the crew – 28 men – died.

John Redmond, leader of the Irish Parliamentary Party, died at London, 6 March 1918. He was interred in the Redmond family vault at St John's Graveyard, John Street, Wexford, later that same month. At the 1918 General Election for the House of Commons at Westminster, County Wexford returned two Sinn Féin candidates, James Ryan and Roger Sweetman – who replaced the Redmondites who had previously held these seats, Peter Ffrench and Thomas Esmonde. However, Sinn Féin refused to take their seats in the British Parliament, instead setting up their own parliament, Dáil Éireann, at Dublin. It met 21 January 1919 for the first time. Only members of Sinn Féin attended. The Dáil set up a Department of Defence, represented by the Irish Republican Army (I.R.A.). Michael Collins and Cathal Brugha were the main leaders of the I.R.A. World War 1 had effectively ended 11 November 1918 with the signing of the armistice of that date. However, while peace came to Europe, troubled times lay ahead for County Wexford and Ireland as a whole. On the same day that the First Dáil met, the Irish War of Independence began.

The Irish War of Independence (1919–1921) was a guerrilla war fought by the I.R.A. in an attempt to end British rule of Ireland and thereby establish an independent Irish state. The War in County Wexford saw numerous attacks on Royal Irish Constabulary (R.I.C.) Barracks – some of which were abandoned by the R.I.C. Post Offices were also attacked and some attacks on the Railways also occurred. A force called the Black and Tans were soon introduced to Ireland and County Wexford, by the British, to deal with the problem. The Black and Tans, because of how they mistreated people, quickly became extremely unpopular. Many people were imprisoned. Probably the most high-profile death of the War in County Wexford was that of Percival Lea-Wilson, a District Inspector in the R.I.C. who was stationed at Gorey. He was shot dead by the I.R.A. outside his Gorey home on 15 June 1920. The greatest number of casualties of the War in County Wexford occurred on 12 October 1920, when 5 men were killed and 9 others injured, when explosives being prepared by the I.R.A. accidentally detonated in an old unoccupied house located at St. Kearns, Saltmills. On 4 January 1921, County Wexford was placed under Martial law. The Irish War of Independence ended on 11 July 1921 – when both sides agreed to a truce. The conflict had reached a stalemate.

Michael Collins visited Wexford town 8–9 April 1922. During a speech he made at Wexford, Collins stated:

It is the departure of British troops that matters. It is this departure that makes us free from their interference, this departure is the one indispensable factor in our freedom. No good can come of a division among ourselves, from civil war, from mutiny ...

On 28 June 1922 the Irish Civil War (1922–1923) began. County Wexford's Civil War was far more viciously fought than its War of Independence – with many more deaths (on both sides). Again it was a guerrilla war. After the signing of the Treaty, the I.R.A. as a whole in County Wexford was divided. The North Wexford and South Wicklow Brigade of the I.R.A., led by Joseph Cummins, supported the Treaty, but the South Wexford Brigade of the I.R.A., led by Thomas O’Sullivan, opposed it. Anti-Treaty I.R.A. units in the county were organized into the Enniscorthy, Murrintown, Kyle, and New Ross Flying Columns, consisting of about 12–20 men each. Numerous attacks on the county's Railways by anti-Treaty I.R.A. units were a major feature of the War in County Wexford. A vicious circle of reprisal killings soon ensued – a sample of these are as follows. On 24 July 1922, an anti-Treaty I.R.A. unit ambushed a train near Killurin's railway station and three Free State soldiers were killed. On 10 October 1922, a senior Free State army officer, Commandant Peter Doyle, of Ballinakill, Marshalstown, was shot in the grounds of St. Aidan's Cathedral, Enniscorthy, by anti-Treaty I.R.A. On 13 March 1923, the Free State side executed 3 anti-Treaty I.R.A. prisoners held in Wexford Jail – James Parle, John Creane, and Patrick Hogan. In a reprisal killing, on 23 March 1923 anti-Treaty I.R.A. took 3 Free State soldiers from a Public House at Ballagh, parish of Adamstown. They were taken to the village of Adamstown where they were shot dead early next morning, on 24 March 1923. The 3 men were Parick Horan, Edward O'Gorman, and Thomas Jones. A fourth Free State soldier, John Croke, was also wounded at the Pub. There were many other killings also. Some of these were stated to be 'accidental'. A number of large houses were burnt down by anti-Treaty I.R.A. units – most notably Castleboro House (February 1923), owned by the Carews, Wilton (March 1923), owned by the Alcocks, and Ballynastragh (March 1923), owned by the Esmondes. The Free State side also imprisoned many suspects.

The anti-Treaty side declared a nationwide ceasefire, 30 April 1923. On 24 May 1923 the war ended, as anti-Treaty I.R.A. units were ordered to dump their arms, which most of them did. The Free State side had won. Normal political activity began to take hold in Ireland from this point forward. Political parties such as Fianna Fáil, Fine Gael, the Labour Party, and others, eventually began to dominate Irish politics.

=== World War II ===
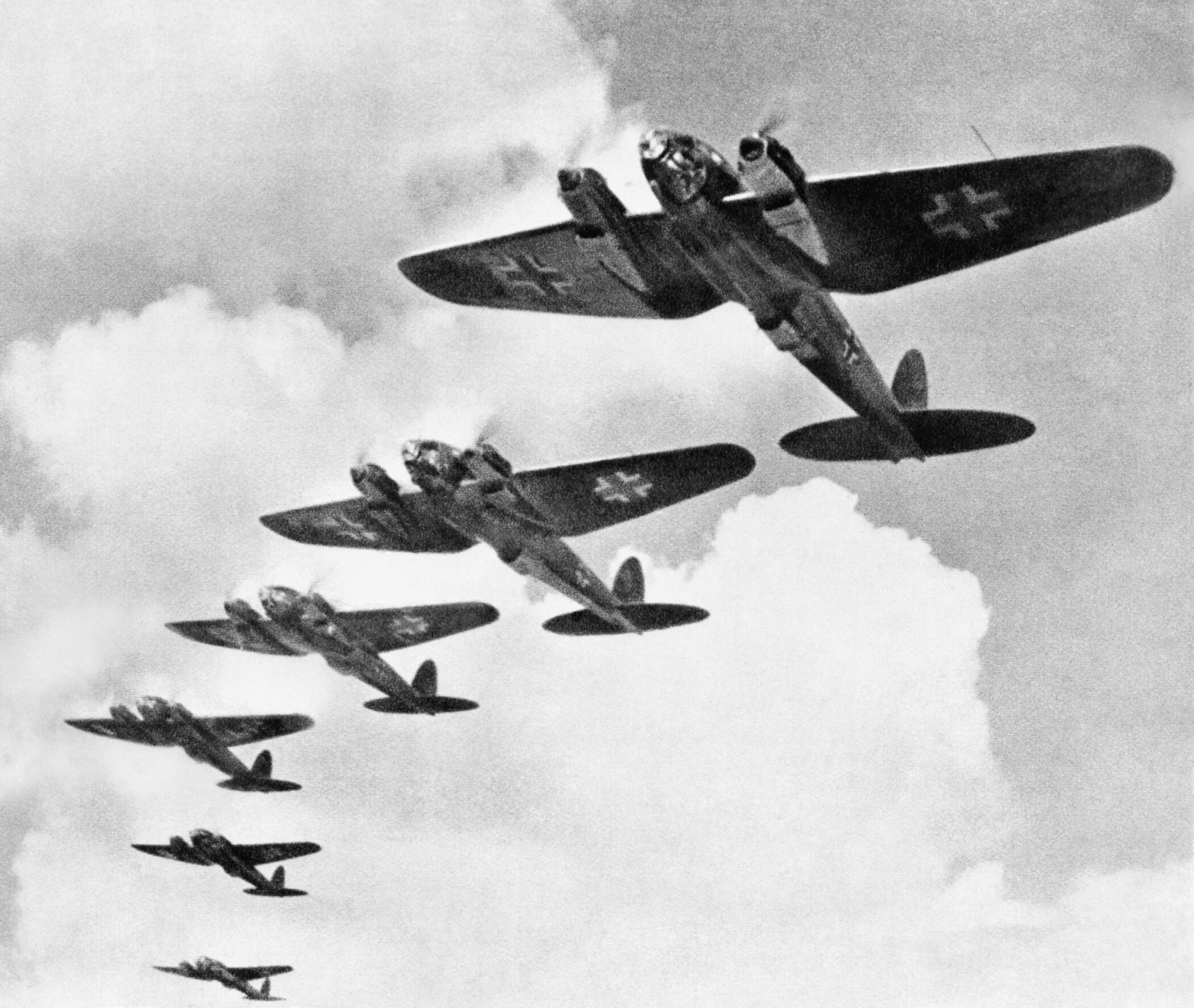
German bombers (Heinkel He 111) over Britain during WW2 – similar to the type that bombed Campile and that crashed near Kiltealy.

Ireland remained officially neutral during World War II. During the war, on 26 August 1940, the German Luftwaffe bombed Campile. Three women were killed. On 11 October 1941 a German Luftwaffe Bomber (Heinkel He 111H-6) crashed into the Blackstairs mountains near Kiltealy, killing all of its four-man crew, having taken off earlier from France. A number of other planes – German and Allied – crashed on County Wexford soil and in its coastal waters during the War, and in many cases there were fatalities. German U-boats were again active in Wexford's coastal waters in World War II. On 11 November 1940, SS Ardmore struck a mine near the Saltee Islands – all of the 24-man crew died.

In Ireland, the Wartime period is referred to as The Emergency. There was a scarcity of goods, as trade between Britain and Ireland was badly disrupted – though some households had stocked up on certain supplies before the outbreak of War. Most of Ireland's imports at that time, unlike today, then came from Britain.

=== Post 1950 ===
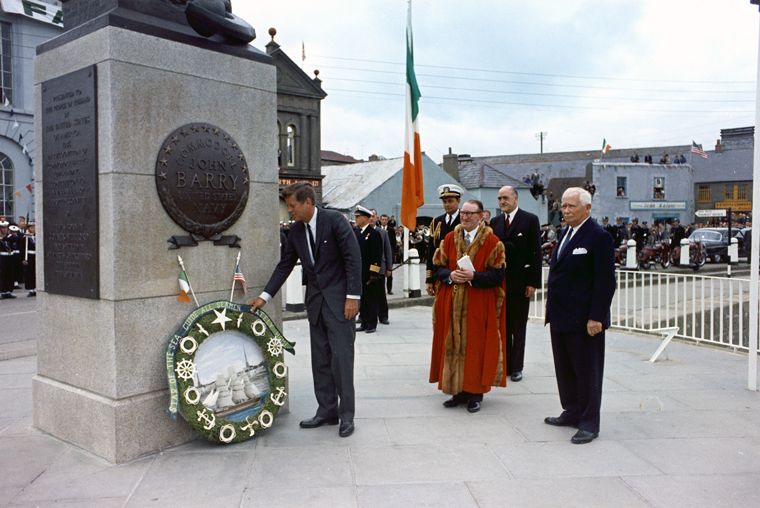
John F. Kennedy visiting the John Barry Memorial at Crescent Quay, Wexford town, Ireland – 27 June 1963.

A huge change came in the 1950s, when most rural areas of the county received electricity for the first time – though some had received it earlier, these were relatively few in number.

In 1963 John F. Kennedy, then president of the United States, visited the county and his ancestral home at Dunganstown, near New Ross. His great grandfather left County Wexford in 1848 and settled at Boston, United States.

Some of the county's railway-lines were closed in the 1960s – Ballywilliam Station, for example, closed in 1963.

On Sunday, 24 March 1968, an Aer Lingus aircraft (called Saint Phelim) crashed into the sea near Tuskar Rock on its way from Cork to London. The exact cause of the crash is to some extent left unexplained – though a 'structural failure of the port tailplane' is the generally stated reason. All 61 people on board, consisting of 57 passengers and 4 crewmembers, were killed. The crash is often referred to as the Tuskar Rock Air Disaster.

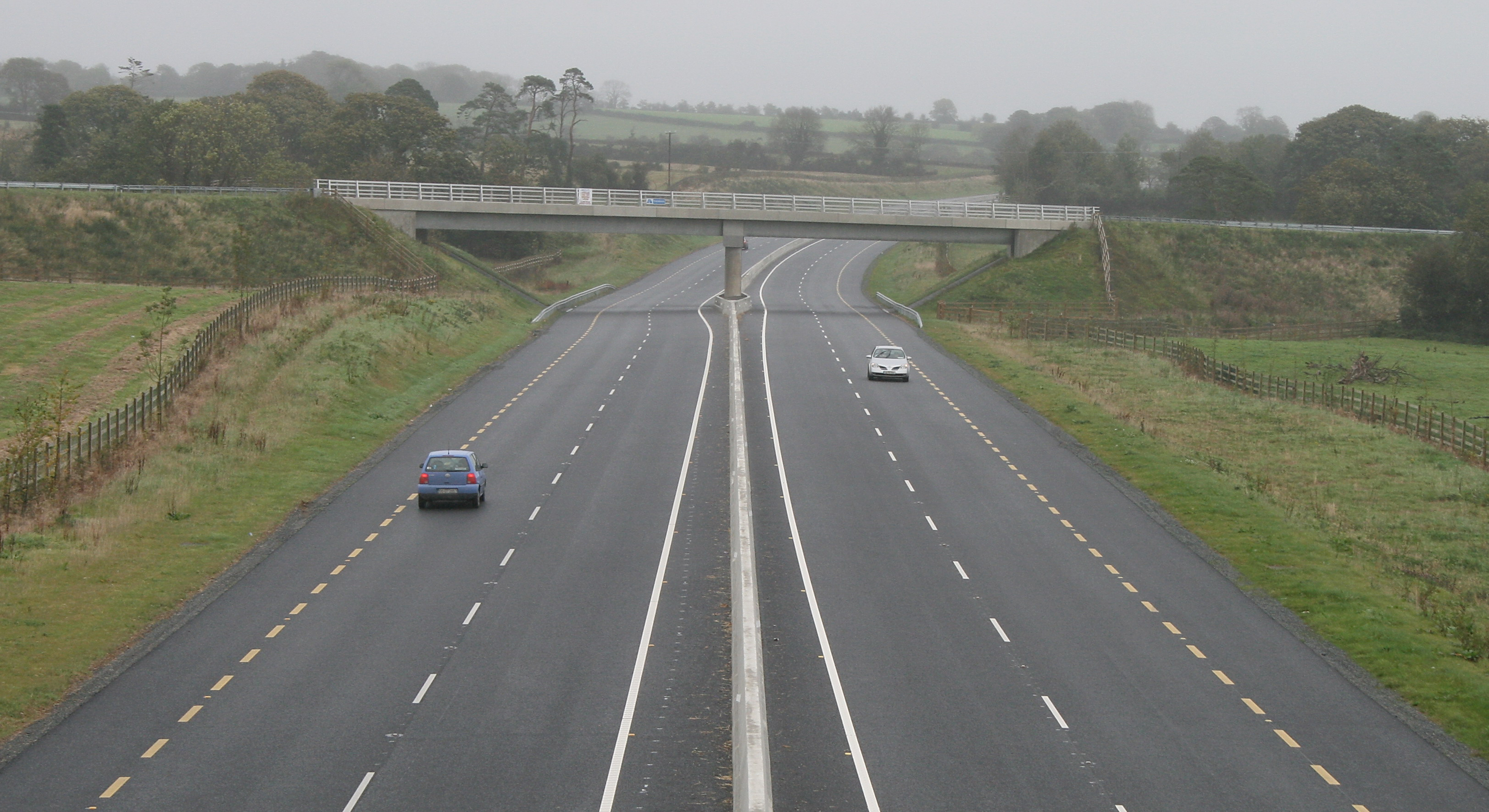
Gorey Bypass – A new road opened September 2007.

Ireland joined the European Economic Community (E.E.C.), now known as the European Union (E.U.), in 1973.

In the late 1970s, plans to build a nuclear power station at Carnsore were abandoned after extensive protests from the public resulted due to environmental and health concerns.

Emigration was also heavy during the 1960s, 1970s, and early 1980s – mainly due to unemployment. The numbers involved in agriculture steadily declined from that period onwards.

In March 1993, Jim Bolger, then Prime Minister of New Zealand visited his parents' homes at Ballyconran and Knockbrandon, County Wexford.

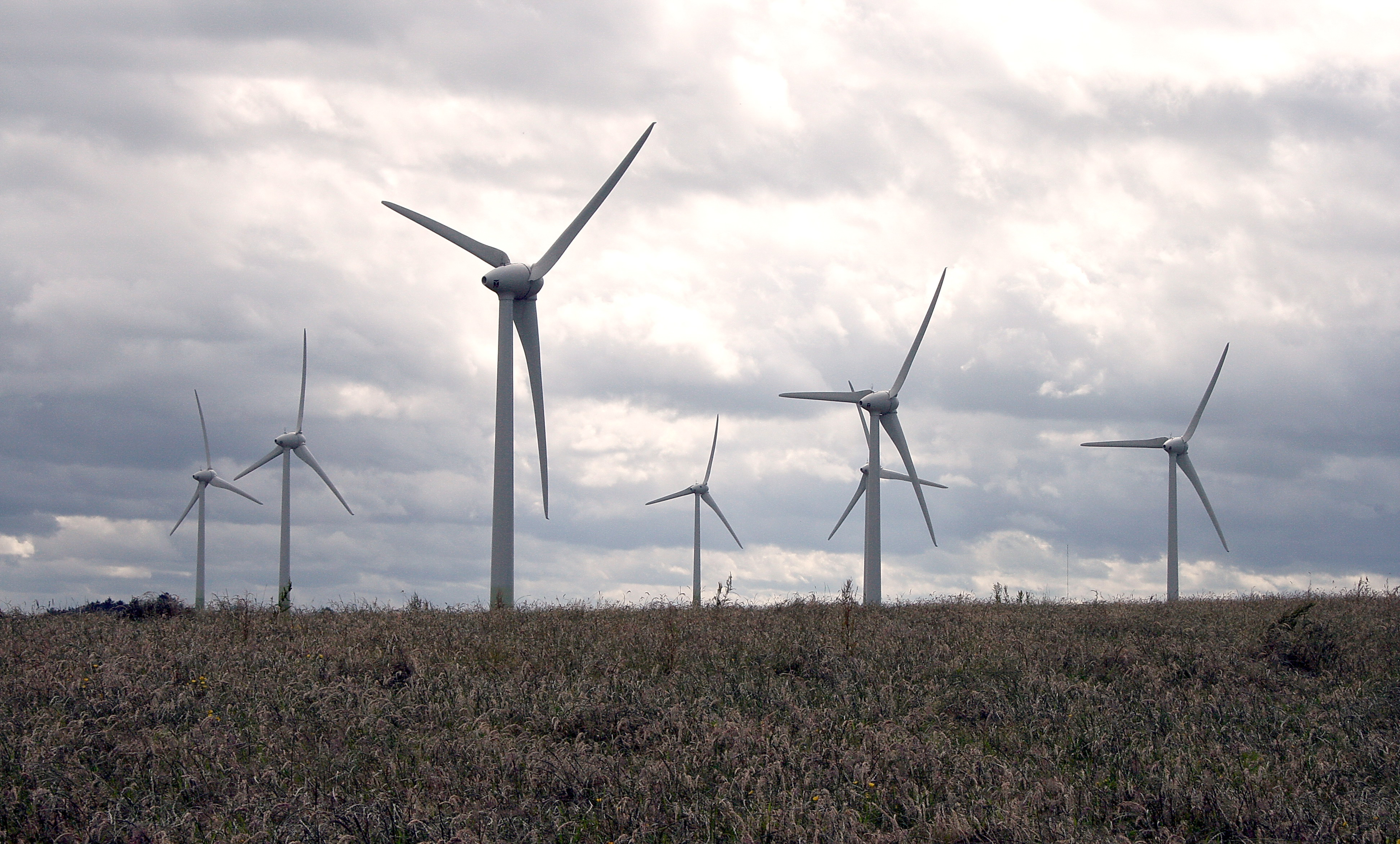
Wind Farm near Kilmuckridge.

In 1998 the 200th anniversary of the 1798 Rebellion was commemorated by Wexford people throughout the year, in a variety of different ways.

The President of Ireland, Mary McAleese, visited New Ross, January 2007.

The last 10–15 years has seen an increase in prosperity. One change is the noticeable improvement in many of the county's major roads. It has also seen a huge influx of immigrants – immigration being previously almost non-existent. A huge number of 'holiday homes' have also been built in the coastal areas of the county. Another change is the decline in the emphasis placed on organized religion.

A number of wind farms have been recently constructed in the county and are now generating electricity.
