= Thomas Cloney =

Irish rebel (1773–1850)

Thomas Cloney (1773 – 20 February 1850) was a United Irishman, and leader of the rebellion in County Wexford in 1798, and with Robert Emmet a co-conspirator in the attempt to renew the republican insurrection in 1803.

== Rebel ==
Thomas Cloney was born to Catholic parents: Denis Cloney, a prosperous middleman, of Moneyhore, Wexford, and his wife, Mary Kavanagh (d. 1782), a native of Ballybeg, County Carlow. Thomas had three sisters but no male siblings.

As a young man, Cloney was appointed a Colonel in the United Irish ranks shortly before the outbreak of the 1798 rebellion. During the insurrection in Wexford he fought at the battles of Three Rocks, New Ross, Foulksmills/Goff's Bridge and led the attack on Borris House. He was often subsequently referred to as "General Cloney".

Following the failure of the rebellion, Cloney was imprisoned at Wexford and, briefly, at the notorious Geneva Barracks and was condemned to death. This sentence was later commuted to banishment for life to the Penal Colony of New South Wales. Later, after spending twenty-one months in gaol, he was released on condition that he leave Ireland for two years, which he primarily spent in Liverpool. (T. Cloney, A narrative of those transactions in the county of Wexford in which the Author was engaged in the awful year of 1798,(Dublin), 1832).

On his return to Ireland in May 1803, Cloney immediately involved himself with Robert Emmet and his associates. In Byrnes's Memoirs, he describes a meeting he arranged between himself and Emmet and Cloney at Harold's Cross Green, Dublin shortly before Emmet's uprising. Circumstantial evidence would suggest that Emmet had appointed Cloney to act as his General for County Wexford, had the anticipated success of the rising in Dublin come about. Following the collapse of Emmett's rising, Cloney was again arrested and lodged in Dublin Castle and later in Kilmainham Gaol from where he was released on health grounds in November 1804.

After his release, Cloney went to live at Graiguenamanagh, County Kilkenny, where his home was nicknamed "Whitehall". Of the principal leaders of the 1798 rebellion, he, along with Joseph Holt was only one of two rebel leaders to survive and remain in Ireland.

== Historian ==
Cloney wrote a history of the 1798 Rebellion which was one of the first written from the perspective of the defeated rebels."A Personal Narrative of those Transactions in the County of Wexford, in which the author was engaged, during the awful period of 1798.". It contains an Appendix which includes a report of Cloney's trial by Court Martial which began on 5 July 1799. He had wished to publish his book earlier but was advised against it by his attorney, Peter Burrowes.

== Later life ==
Cloney continued his involvement in political affairs, becoming one of the most active and enthusiastic supporters of Daniel O'Connell in his efforts to secure Catholic Emancipation and Repeal of the Union. Cloney was visited at his home at "Whitehall" by many prominent Irish figures of the period, including Father Theobald Mathew, Daniel O'Connell and Archibald Hamilton Rowan. In 1848, he was visited there by William Smith O'Brien, Thomas Francis Meagher and John Blake Dillon, just prior to the Young Irelander Rebellion of 1848. In 1849, Charles Gavan Duffy visited him. Cloney never married but played a prominent role in the parochial and political life of Graiguenamanagh and lived there for the remainder of his life. He died on 20 February 1850, aged 76 or 77, and was interred at St Mullin's Cemetery, County Carlow, where a large tombstone marks his final resting place, overlooking the River Barrow.

== Sources ==
- Edward Hay, "History of the Insurrection of the County of Wexford, A. D. 1798" (Dublin, 1803)
- Stephen Gwynn (ed.), "Memoirs of Miles Byrne - edited by his Widow", 2 vols. (Dublin & London, 1907).
- K. Whelan (ed) & W. Nolan (assoc. ed.), "Wexford: History and Society" (Dublin: Geography Publications, 1987)
- Joyce, John. General Thomas Cloney: A Wexford Rebel of 1798 (Dublin: Geography Publications, 1988)
