= Bargy Castle =

Castle in County Wexford, Ireland

- Near Tomhaggard, County Wexford in Ireland
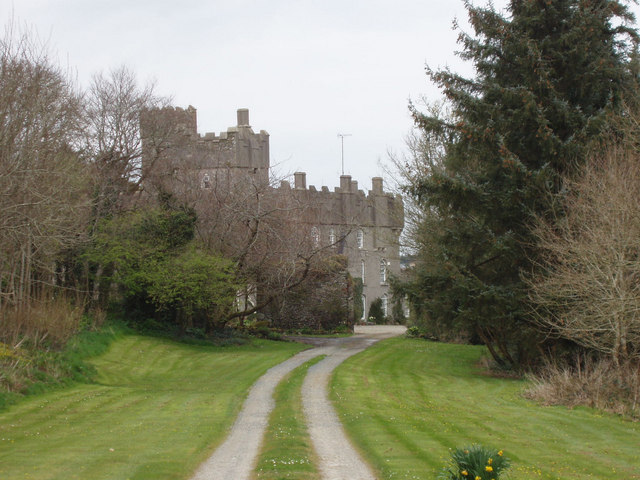
- Bargy Castle

Site information
- Type: Norman fortress
- Owner: Chris de Burgh
- Open to the public: Yes

Location
- Location within island of Ireland
- Coordinates: 52°13′21.8″N 6°29′33.0″W

Site history
- Built: 15th century
- Built by: Rossiter family
- In use: 1667-present

Bargy Castle is a Norman fortress near the village of Tomhaggard in the Barony of Bargy, County Wexford, Ireland, some 12 kilometres (7.5 mi) south-west of Wexford town. The name Bargy derives from Ui Bhairrche, the name of a local tribe.

The building is a square keep to which two wings have been added at right angles during the fifteenth and seventeenth centuries. The keep itself is in good condition, having been renovated several times.

== History ==
=== Rossiters and Harveys ===
From the 15th century, the castle was occupied by the Rossiter family until 1667, when it was confiscated by Cromwell in response to Rossiter's part in the defence of Wexford. It was then granted to William Ivory, who sold it to the Harvey family. It came down to Beauchamp Bagenal Harvey, the commander of the Wexford insurgents in the Wexford Rebellion of 1798. After the suppression of the uprising, and Harvey's execution on Wexford bridge, the castle was again confiscated and used as a barracks until 1808, after which it was handed back to James Harvey, Bagenal's brother. He, however, lived in London and allowed the castle to deteriorate. After his death, it passed to Councillor John Harvey, who restored it. He died in 1880 and is entombed in a mausoleum in front of the hall door. The castle was afterwards let to a Mr Leared, who re-roofed and improved it. The last Harvey family member to own this castle was James Harvey, with his wife Henrietta; their daughter, Antoinette Harvey, was born in the castle in 1945.

=== Davisons and de Burghs ===
Bargy Castle was purchased in 1960 by Colonel Charles Davison, the father of Chris de Burgh, and the family moved into the castle on 1 December 1960. Within three weeks of occupation, on 18 December, Chris and his older brother Richard Davison discovered explosives, including sticks of gelignite and gunpowder, in a secret passage in a tower within the castle as they were exploring. Their father stated that judging by the paper on the gelignite, it was made in Glasgow in 1880. In July 1961, a licence was granted to Maeve Davison (née de Burgh) for the castle to be run as a hotel, which she ran with her husband and her father, Eric de Burgh.
