= John Henry Colclough =

John Henry Colclough (/ˈkoʊkliː/, COKE-lee; c. 1769 – 28 June 1798) was a United Irishman, who was executed in Wexford following the Irish Rebellion of 1798.

== Life ==
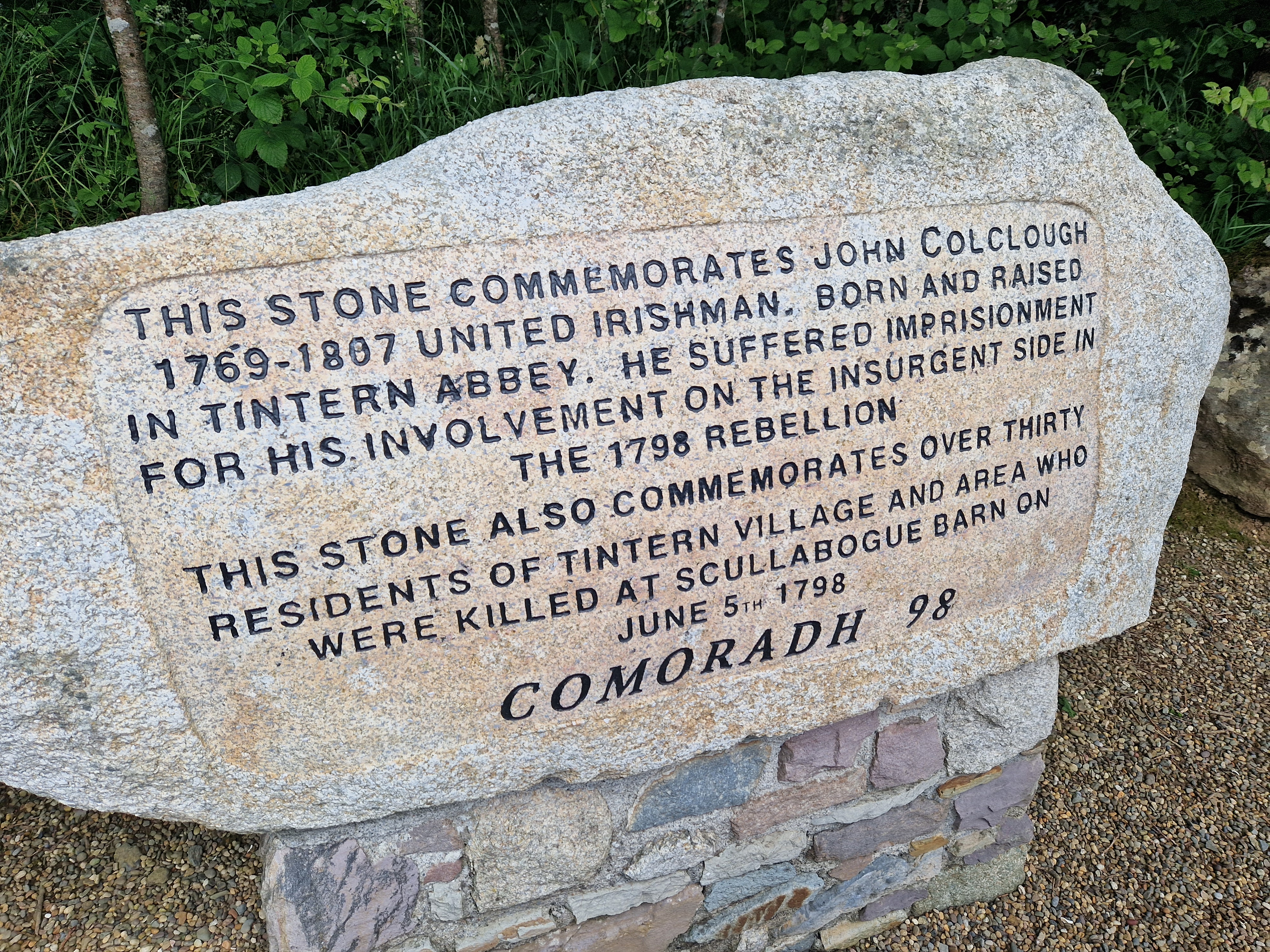
Memorial stone in Tintern Abbey, County Wexford

He was born circa 1769 into an old landowning Wexford family, the son of Thomas Francis Colclough and lived at Ballyteigue, Kilmore. He went abroad to study medicine and qualified as a doctor. On his return to Wexford he married Elizabeth Berry.

Colclough became involved with the United Irishmen who, seeking to secure for Ireland a representative national government, determined upon a republican insurrection against the British Crown. Responding, it was later claimed, to pressure from his tenants, he was then seen in the company of the rebels at the Battle of New Ross.

After the rebel defeat, he fled with his wife and Bagenal Harvey to the Greater Saltee Island, from whence they planned to escape to republican France. They were betrayed under torture by a local farmer, arrested, and brought to Wexford town to be court-martialled. Found guilty, they were hanged on Wexford bridge on 28 June 1798, their heads afterwards put on spikes and their bodies thrown into the River Slaney. Colclough's body was recovered by his supporters during the night and buried in St. Patrick's burying ground, Wexford.

== See also ==
- Wexford Rebellion of 1798
- Bagenal Harvey, Cornelius Grogan, Matthew Keogh, Philip Roche, John Kelly of Killanne - Rebel leaders hanged on Wexford bridge, 28 June 1798

== Sources ==
- "Leaders of 1798". National 1798 Centre, Enniscorthy, Co. Wexford, Ireland. Archived from the original on 23 March 2012.
- Webb, Alfred (1878). "John Henry Colclough". A Compendium of Irish Biography. Library Ireland.
- Henderson, Thomas Finlayson (1887). "Colclough, John Henry" . In Stephen, Leslie (ed.). Dictionary of National Biography. Vol. 11. London: Smith, Elder & Co. p. 260.
- Kelly, James (2004). "Colclough, John Henry (1769/70–1798)". Oxford Dictionary of National Biography. Oxford Dictionary of National Biography (online ed.). Oxford University Press. doi:10.1093/ref:odnb/5839. (Subscription, Wikipedia Library access or UK public library membership required.)
