= Battle of Three Rocks =

Battle in the 1798 Irish Rebellion

Coordinates: 52°19′53.91″N 6°32′39.85″W

- Part of the Irish Rebellion
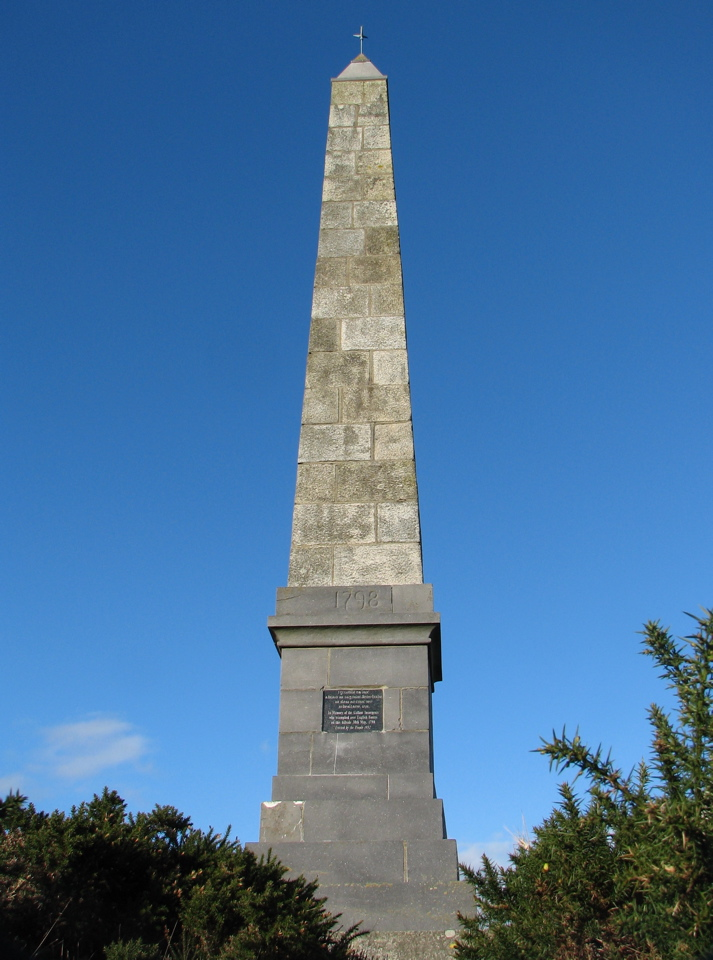
- Monument at the site of the battle. Erected in 1952.
Date	30 May 1798
Location	Forth Mountain, County Wexford
Result	Irish victory.: British abandon Wexford.

Belligerents
United Irishmen	(Kingdom of Great Britain) British Army: (Kingdom of Ireland) Loyalists

Commanders and leaders
Thomas Cloney; Robert Carty; John Kelly; Michael Furlong	Captain Adams; Lieutenant Birch

Strength
1,000–2,000	100

Casualties and losses
Unknown	70 dead, 18 captured

The Battle of Three Rocks was a United Irish victory during the Wexford Rebellion, a part of the 1798 rebellion, against a British artillery column marching to reinforce Wexford town against anticipated rebel attack.

== Background ==
By 29 May, patriot victories at Oulart Hill and Enniscorthy had spread the rising throughout county Wexford, with patriot camps amassing at several locations and confining British troops to a few towns now vulnerable to attack, such as Wexford, Gorey, and Bunclody/Newtownbarry.

Upon receipt of these reports, General Fawcett, commander of the British garrison at Duncannon fort, led a column of 200 soldiers to bolster the garrison at Wexford town. Orders were given for a supporting artillery column of almost 100 militia and gunners with two howitzers to follow and link up with the infantry column halfway between Wexford and Duncannon at the village of Taghmon.

Making rapid progress and encountering no opposition, Fawcett's column arrived about dusk at Taghmon and free-quartered his troops for the night among the inhabitants of the village. Sometime after two o’clock in the morning, the slower artillery column arrived at Taghmon but inexplicably continued without stopping towards Wexford for reasons that remain unclear.

== Rebel preparations ==
A large group of rebels, aware of the advancing British redcoats prepared an ambush at the eastern end of Forth Mountain, where the ground receded to the "Three Rocks". In the pre-dawn darkness, rebel musket men were stationed immediately parallel to the anticipated line of advance, backed by hundreds of pikemen concealed behind the rock outcrops and scrub. Rebel signallers with flags watched the approaches and gave signal to fire when the troops reached the chosen killing ground.

As dawn broke, the British column walked unsuspectingly into the trap and suffered a close-range volley of musket fire followed by a massed pike charge into the line, giving the soldiers no chance of regrouping. The fighting was over in a matter of minutes, leaving around 70 of the militia dead, most of the gunners captured, and the two howitzers in the hands of the rebels.

== British retreat and withdrawal ==
A few survivors of the rout reached Fawcett's force in Taghmon about an hour later, bringing news of the disaster. Unnerved by the annihilation of his support column and by the prospect of attack from United Irishmen armed with artillery, Fawcett ordered his men to retreat to Duncannon, thus abandoning his original mission to relieve Wexford.

Meanwhile, the commander of the British garrison at Wexford, General Maxwell, concerned by the non-arrival of the troops from Duncannon and by reports of fighting, led a force of cavalry in the direction of the Three Rocks to meet the expected reinforcements. They soon encountered United Irishmen drawing up the captured artillery to use against Wexford and fled back to the town but lost a cavalry captain to rebel gunfire before escaping.

== Fall of Wexford ==
The retreat of the cavalry, news of defeat at Three Rocks, the prospect of facing patriots with artillery, and the visible massing of more patriots north across Wexford bridge sapped the garrison's will to resist, and envoys suing for peace were dispatched to parley with the approaching patriots. Though the intention to surrender the town was genuine, the garrison had no intention of being held prisoner by the patriots and sneaked away while the United Irishmen were distracted by the peace envoys, wreaking revenge by indiscriminately burning, raping and murdering as they fled to Duncannon.

The garrison was well away before the United Irishmen forces entered the town, freeing prisoners such as Bagenal Harvey, setting up a Committee of Public Safety derived from the French model, and even organising a makeshift navy to protect the harbour. Any British military personnel or prominent loyalists who failed to escape were quickly rounded up to be lodged in the town jail, a prison ship, or makeshift prisons.

The United Irishmen now had control of almost all County Wexford, and were in a powerful position to launch offensives against the few remaining foreign garrisons in the county at Bunclody, Gorey, and New Ross.

== Commemorations ==
Commemorations for the Battle of Three Rocks were held near Barntown in 2023, marking the 225th anniversary of the event. Maura Bell, mayor of Wexford, started the event with an invocation, followed by a talk by a historian, and a laying of wreaths at the battlefield monument.
