= John Kelly of Killanne =

Leader in the Irish Rebellion of 1798

John Kelly (Kelly of Killanne) (1773 – c. 25 June 1798) lived in the town of Killanne in the parish of Rathnure, west of Enniscorthy, in County Wexford in Ireland, and was a United Irish leader who fought in the Irish Rebellion of 1798. Kelly was obviously well known to rebels and loyalists alike during the short duration of the Wexford Rebellion but very little is known of him outside this time. Research near the rebellion's bicentennial showed that Kelly was a churchwarden at the local St Ann's for many years before the rebellion. He was one of the leaders of the rebel victory at the Battle of Three Rocks which led to the capture of Wexford town but was later seriously wounded while leading a rebel column at the Battle of New Ross.

Robert Gogan describes how Kelly was under orders from the Wexford commander Bagenal Harvey to attack the military outposts around New Ross but on no account to attack the town itself. The rebels outnumbered the government forces and so Harvey sent a messenger to give them an opportunity to surrender. The messenger was shot while carrying a white flag. This angered the rebels who began the attack without receiving the official order from Harvey. Kelly's column of 800 men attacked and broke through Ross's "Three Bullet Gate" and proceeded into the town itself. After initial success, they were eventually beaten back by the government forces and Kelly was wounded in the leg. He was moved to Wexford to recuperate but, after the fall of Wexford on 21 June, was dragged from his bed, tried and sentenced to death. He was hanged on 25 June 1798 along with seven other rebel leaders on Wexford bridge, after which his body was decapitated, the trunk thrown into the River Slaney and the head kicked through the streets before being set on display on a spike.

== In popular culture ==
His exploits are commemorated in the famous Irish ballad Kelly the Boy From Killane written by Patrick Joseph McCall (1861–1919). Liam Gaul describes how McCall wrote the song to commemorate the centenary of the 1798 Rebellion, although it was not published in book form until it appeared in McCall's Irish Fireside Songs in 1911. Gaul says the origin of the melody used in the song is uncertain. There is no known reference to it before it was used in Kelly the Boy From Killane but it may have been written by McCall's friend and collaborator, Arthur Warren Darley, who is also said to have written the airs for "The Boys of Wexford" and "Boolavogue". Don Partridge recorded a solo acoustic version of the song in 1964, and would later regularly play the song during street busking, before and after his hit records in the late 1960s.

=== Lyrics ===
What's the news, what's the news oh my bold Shelmalier
With your long-barrelled guns from the sea
Say what wind from the south brings a messenger here
With the hymn of the dawn for the free
Goodly news, goodly news do I bring youth of Forth
Goodly news shall you hear Bargy man
For the boys march at dawn from the south to the north
Led by Kelly the boy from Killane

Tell me who is that giant with the gold curling hair
He who rides at the head of your band
Seven feet is his height with some inches to spare
And he looks like a king in command
Ah my boys that's the pride of the bold Shelmaliers
'Mongst greatest of heroes a man
Fling your beavers aloft and give three ringing cheers
For John Kelly the boy from Killane

Enniscorthy's in flames and old Wexford is won
And tomorrow the Barrow we will cross
On a hill o'er the town we have planted a gun
That will batter the gateway to Ross
All the Forth men and Bargy men will march o'er the heath
With brave Harvey to lead in the van
But the foremost of all in that grim gap of death
Will be Kelly the boy from Killane

But the gold sun of freedom grew darkened at Ross
And it set by the Slaney's red waves
And poor Wexford stripped naked, hung high on a cross
With her heart pierced by traitors and slaves
Glory-o, glory-o to her brave sons who died
For the cause of long down-trodden man
Glory-o to Mount Leinster's own darling and pride
Dauntless Kelly the boy from Killane

== See also ==
- Wexford Rebellion of 1798
- Bagenal Harvey, John Henry Colclough, Cornelius Grogan, Matthew Keogh, Philip Roche – Rebel leaders hanged on Wexford bridge, 25/28 June 1798
