= Cornelius Grogan =

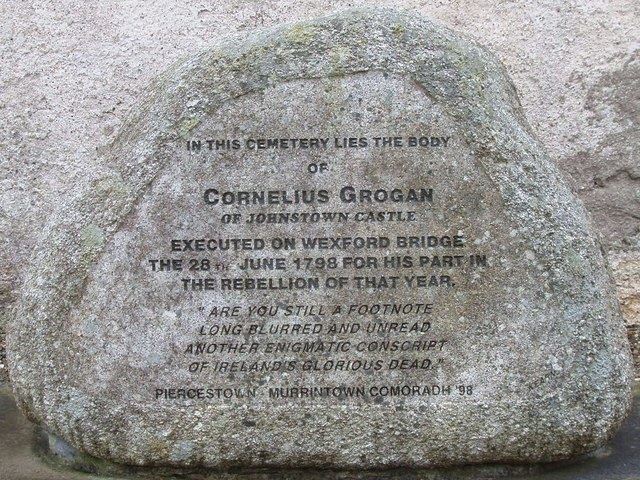
Cornelius Grogan memorial at Redmondstown church

Cornelius Grogan (1738?–1798), was a United Irishman and commissary-general in the insurgent army of Wexford in the Rebellion of 1798.

== Biography ==
Grogan was born about 1738, the eldest son of John Grogan of Johnstown Castle, Wexford, by his wife Catherine, daughter and heiress of Major Andrew Knox of Rathmacknee. His father, a Protestant landlord, was a member of the Parliament of Ireland. His mother was the heiress of a well-known Scots family, which produced two bishops of the Church of Scotland. Grogan succeeded to the family estates, was High Sheriff of Wexford for 1779 and was from 1768 to 1776 M.P. for Enniscorthy (his father's old seat) in the Irish parliament. He was a popular landlord, but due to failing health, he rarely left home in his last years. He never married.

On the outbreak of the Irish rebellion of 1798, Grogan joined the insurgents (whether willingly or under compulsion was later the crucial issue at his trial), and became commissary-general in their army. When Wexford was taken by the government forces Grogan was tried by court-martial.

He pleaded that he had been forced to take a nominal lead, but had been guilty of no overt act of treason. His plea was rejected, and he was hanged and beheaded on Wexford bridge on 28 June 1798. Two other landlords of Wexford who had taken the same action as himself, John Henry Colclough and Bagenal Beauchamp Harvey, suffered with him, as well as other rebel leaders. Harvey to the end maintained that Grogan was an innocent man. Their heads were set up on the courthouse, and their bodies flung into the River Slaney, but Grogan's body was recovered by his followers, and secretly buried at Rathaspick, near Johnstown.

His estates were escheated by the Crown, but were restored on the payment of a heavy fine to his youngest and only surviving brother, John Knox. Another brother, Thomas, a lieutenant in the British army, was killed at the battle of Arklow on 9 June 1798. A cousin from the Dublin branch of the family, Edward Grogan (1802–1891), M.P. for Dublin City from 1841 to 1868, was created a baronet on 23 April 1859.

== See also ==
- Wexford Rebellion of 1798
- Bagenal Harvey, John Henry Colclough, Matthew Keogh, Philip Roche, John Kelly of Killanne - Rebel leaders hanged on Wexford bridge, 25/28 June 1798
