= Margaret Ó hÓgartaigh =

Irish author (1967–2014)

- Picture of Margaret Ó hÓgartaigh
- Born: 10 July 1967; Killaloe, County Clare, Ireland
- Died: 17 December 2014 (aged 47); Blackrock, Dublin, Ireland
- Occupations: Historian, Lecturer, Author
- Spouse: Ciarán Ó hÓgartaigh

Margaret Ó hÓgartaigh (born Margaret Whelan; 10 July 1967 – 17 December 2014) was an Irish historian and author.

== Early life ==
Ó hÓgartaigh was born Margaret Whelan on 10 July 1967 in Killaloe, County Clare to James and Eileen Whelan. She attended St Anne's Secondary School in Killaloe and went on to study history and English at NUI Galway, where she was also awarded a first class honours MA in 1991 for her research on the historian Edward Hay. She went on to complete her doctoral thesis in University College Dublin in 1999, entitled "‘Far from Few’; Professional Women in Ireland, 1880-1930".

== Career ==
As a historian her work focused primarily on the contribution of women to Irish society, and their work in many professions, including accountancy, medicine, nursing, sport and education, as well looking at their contribution in religion.

She taught in Ireland at the University of Limerick, St Patrick's College Drumcondra, All Hallows College, and NUI Maynooth. Internationally she was awarded a Fulbright scholarship in 2000 and worked at Boston College. She was would frequently return to teach at Boston College and Harvard, and from 2006 to 2008 she lectured on the history of medicine in New Zealand.

Her publications included, her seminal biography on Kathleen Lynn, "Kathleen Lynn: Irishwoman, Patriot and Doctor" (2006); "Gender and Medicine in Ireland, 1700-1950 (edited with Margaret Preston) (2012); "His Grace is Displeased: The Selected Correspondence of John Charles McQuaid, 1940-1972 (edited with Clara Cullen) (2013). She also contributed to bibliographies and wrote articles in reference works such as the Encyclopaedia of Ireland (2003), the Oxford Dictionary of National Biography (2004) and the Dictionary of Irish Biography (2009).

=== Books ===
Some of her publications include:

- Kathleen Lynn, Irishwoman, Patriot, Doctor (Irish Academic Press, Dublin and Portland, Oregon, 2006).
- Edward Hay, Historian of 1798. Catholic Politics in an Era of Wolfe Tone and Daniel O’Connell (The History Press, Dublin, 2010).
- Business Archival Sources for the Local Historian (Four Courts Press, Dublin and Portland, Oregon, 2010). [with Ciarán Ó hÓgartaigh, University College, Dublin].
- Quiet Revolutionaries: Irish Women in Education, Medicine and Sport, 1861-1964 (The History Press, Dublin and London, 2011).
- Gender and Medicine in Ireland: 1700-1950 by Margaret Preston and Margaret Ó hÓgartaigh ( Syracuse University Press Nov 2012)
- His Grace is Displeased: The Selected Correspondence of John Charles McQuaid, Roman Catholic Archbishop of Dublin, 1940-1972 by Clara Cullen and Margaret Ó hÓgartaigh (Merrion, 2012).

== Interests ==
Ó hÓgartaigh was a cross-country runner and field-eventer, and won athletics titles in New Zealand and five All Ireland medals, and gained a silver medal for Ireland in the hammer at the European Masters Games in Sweden (2008).

== Death ==
She died on 17 December 2014, aged 47, after a six-month battle with cancer.

== Legacy ==
A 5000m memorial race, the Margaret Ó hÓgartaigh Women’s Memorial Race, was held in the Nelson Mandela Stadium, Kampala on 30 May 2015 in her honour.

In 2016 the Irish History Students' Association announced the creation of the Dr. Margaret Ó hÓgartaigh Memorial Prize For The History Of Medicine And Society for the best paper on the topics of Medicine, Gender, Education, Irishwomen, Religion, or Athletics
