= Philip Roche =

18th century Irish Catholic priest and revolutionary

Philip Roche (died 1798) was an Irish Roman Catholic priest who in the Irish Rebellion of 1798 commanded insurgents in Wexford and was subsequently executed.

== Life ==
He was a priest attached to the parish of Poulpeasty, County Wexford, and formerly of Gorey. He apparently joined rebels encamped at the foot of Corrigrua Hill, under the command of Father John Murphy (1753?–1798), shortly before the battle of Tubberneering, on 4 June 1798. Information given to him helped the rebels to anticipate and frustrate the attack of Major-general Loftus and Colonel Walpole. His bravery at Tubberneering won him a reputation with the insurgents, and when Beauchamp Bagenal Harvey was three or four days later deposed from his command, Roche was elected commander of the rebels encamped at Slyeeve-Keelter, near New Ross.

After unsuccessful attempts to intercept the navigation of the river, Roche moved his camp to Lacken Hill, where he remained for some time almost inactive. On 19 June he was surprised, and compelled to retreat from Lacken Hill to Three Rocks, near Wexford. On the following day, he intercepted a detachment under Sir John Moore, who was moving up to join in the attack on Vinegar Hill, at a place called Goffsbridge, or Foulkes Mill, near the church of Horetown. His disposition of his forces was skilled, but after a fierce engagement, which lasted four hours, was compelled to fall back on Three Rocks, effecting a retreat in good order.

After the battle of Vinegar Hill and the surrender of Wexford, Roche, seeing that further resistance was hopeless, decided to capitulate, and went alone and unarmed to Wexford. On entering the town he was seized, dragged from his horse, kicked and beaten. He was tried by court-martial, and hanged on Wexford bridge on 25 June 1798, along with Matthew Keogh and seven others, and his body was thrown into the river.

== See also ==
- Battle of New Ross (1798)
- Battle of Foulksmills
- Wexford Rebellion
- Bagenal Harvey, John Henry Colclough, Cornelius Grogan, Matthew Keogh, John Kelly of Killanne - Rebel leaders hanged on Wexford bridge, 25/28 June 1798
