= Foulkesmill =

Village in County Wexford, Ireland

Foulkesmill Muileann Fúca
- Village
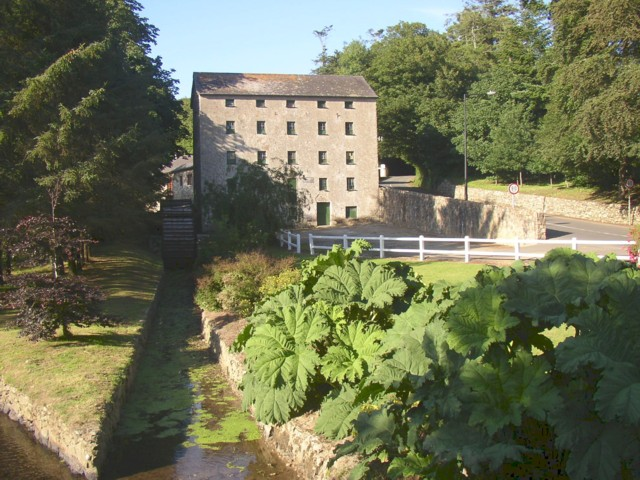
- Corn mill at Foulkesmill in County Wexford

- Location in Ireland
- Coordinates: 52.3142°N 6.753°W
- Country: Ireland
- Province: Leinster
- County: Wexford

Foulkesmill or Foulkesmills (Irish: Muileann Fúca) is a small village located in the south of County Wexford, Ireland.

== History ==
The Irish name Muileann Fúca was historically anglicised as Mullinfooky. The English name comes from Sir Foulkes Furlong (fl. 1410) who was Seneschall of Bree.

A battle was fought near here on 20 June 1798, during the Irish Rebellion of 1798. It is known as the Battle of Horetown (or Goff's Bridge, or Foulksmills). A large contingent of United Irishmen armed with pikes engaged in battle a smaller British Crown force armed with rifles and cannon, commanded by General John Moore; both sides withdrew after heavy fighting.

Lewis’s Topographical Dictionary of Ireland (1837) has the following entry regarding Foulkesmill:

FOOK'S MILLS, a village, partly in the parish of CLONGEEN, and partly in that of HORETOWN, barony of SHELMALIER, county of WEXFORD, and province of LEINSTER, 3½ miles (S. W.) from Taghmon, on the old mail road to New Ross : the population is returned with the respective parishes. It contains about 30 houses, including a good country inn, where the meetings of the South Wexford Agricultural Association are occasionally held. In the immediate vicinity are Rosegarland, the seat of F. Leigh, Esq., and Horetown Glebe, the residence of the Rev. E. Bayley.

== Public transport ==
Three Bus Éireann routes serve Foulkesmill; route 370 provides a commuter service to Waterford via New Ross Mondays to Saturdays inclusive with a return journey in the evening. This route continues to Rosslare Europort offering the possibility of connecting with sailings to Wales and Cherbourg in France. Monday-only route 372 and Friday-only route 371 provide a link to/from Wexford.

== See also ==
- List of towns and villages in Ireland
