= Wexford Rebellion =

1798 Irish rebellion against British rule

- Wexford Croppie Pikemen
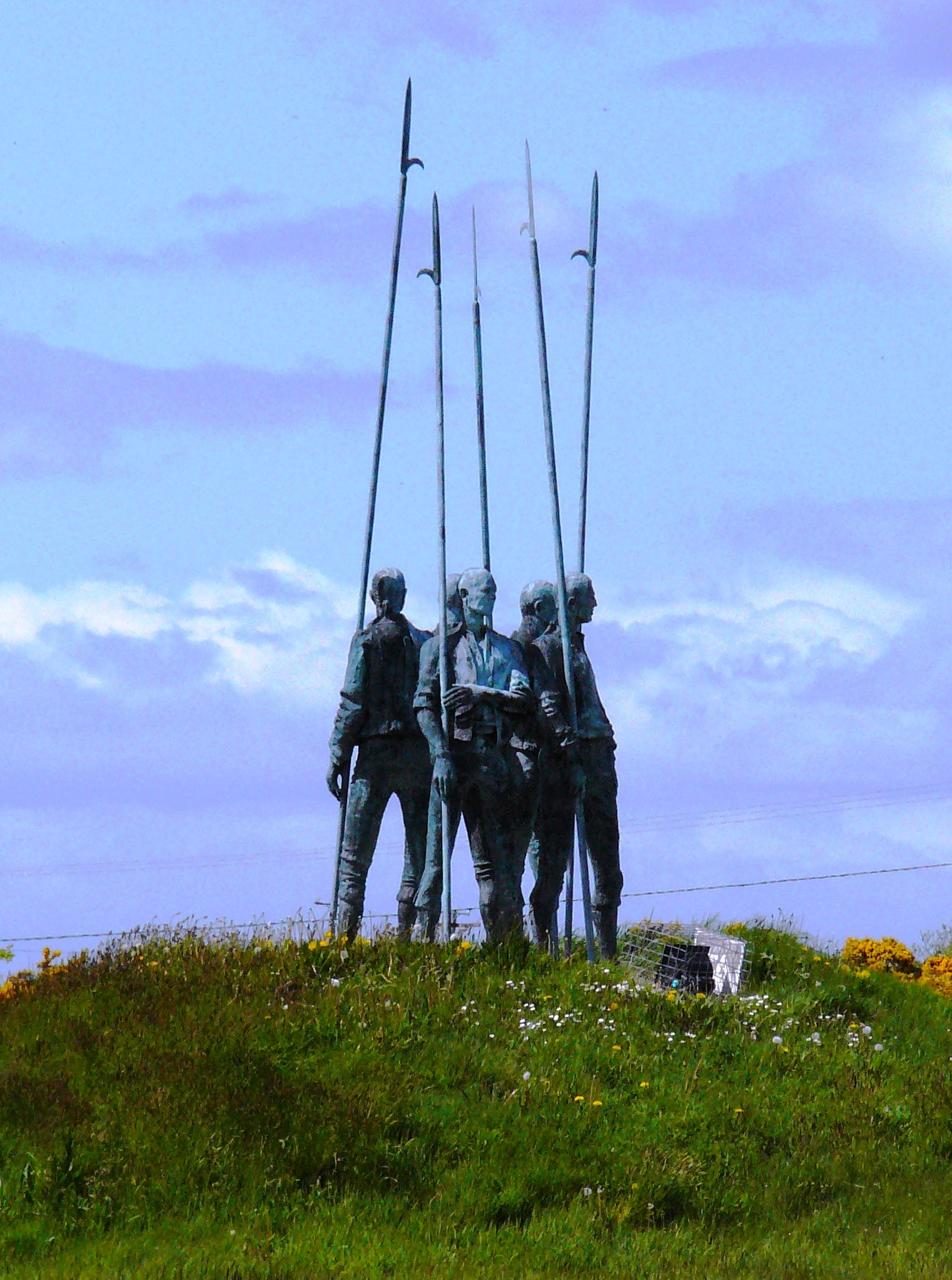
- Society of United Irishmen
- Location: N25 road to New Ross
- Designer: Éamonn O'Doherty
- Material: Bronze
- Completion date: 1798
- Dedicated to: 1798 Rebellion

The Wexford Rebellion refers to the events of the Irish Rebellion of 1798 in County Wexford. From 27 May until 21 June 1798, Society of United Irishmen rebels revolted against British rule in the county, engaging in multiple confrontations with Crown forces. The most successful and destructive rising in all the counties of Ireland, United Irishmen rebels experienced a number of early successes in the county despite being seen as a relatively loyal county by the Dublin Castle administration due to a series of military victories. However, the tide soon turned against the United Irishmen in Wexford as Crown forces poured into the region, engaging in a brutal counterinsurgency which indiscriminately targeted suspected rebels and eventually suppressed all rebel activities in the county.

== Background ==
The County Wexford branch of the Society of United Irishmen had remained relatively intact during the government repression by the Dublin Castle administration which saw neighbouring branches in other counties of Ireland severely weakened. However, in May 1798, just as the Irish Rebellion of 1798 erupted in County Kildare, militia troops arrested yeomanry veteran and senior United Irishmen leader Anthony Perry in Inch, County Wexford. Perry was taken to Gorey and interrogated; after enduring a session of torture, including pitchcapping, he identified a number of people as United Irishmen leaders, including Bagenal Harvey, all of whom were arrested by Crown forces.

== Rebellion ==
News of the arrests and of the Dunlavin Green executions in County Wicklow spread throughout Wexford, and, on the night of 26 May, rebels (known as Croppies for their short haircut) mobilised throughout north county Wexford and attacked military and loyalist targets for arms. The government rushed in troops, generally known as "Yeomen". Next morning, the rebels gathered at Oulart Hill and Ballyminaun Hill. The rebels were crushed at Ballyminaun, but they won a significant victory at Oulart Hill, led by Father John Murphy and others, defeating a company of soldiers. On the way to Enniscorthy, the Croppies increased their numbers to about 6,000. They won victory in Enniscorthy on 28 May, and, two days later, took Wexford town from one Colonel Maxwell. When the rebels entered Enniscorthy on 28 May, they found that one of the leading merchants, William Barker, had been a captain in Walsh's Regiment of the Irish Brigade in the service of King Louis XVI and had returned to the town to manage the family business on the dissolution of the Irish Brigade at the Revolution in 1798. They persuaded him to join them. Following the Battle of Three Rocks, the seizure of Wexford town and county on 30 May by the United Irishmen Insurgent forces under Colonel Thomas Cloney closed the first phase of the Wexford Rising and increased the rebels' numbers to 10,000.

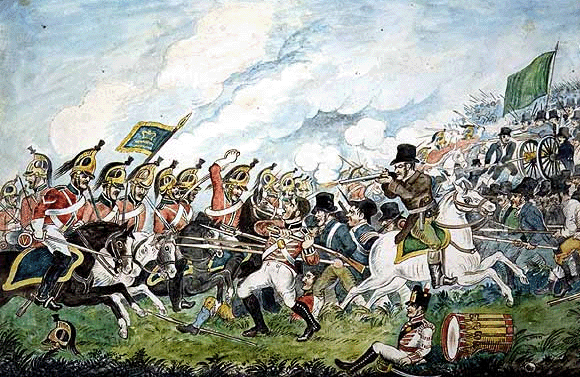
Battle of Vinegar Hill, 21 June 1798

The second phase of the Rising occurred between 1 June and 21 June 1798. The citizens of County Wexford established a republican regime with civilian leadership. This republic decided to split up the rebels of Wexford; one group was to move north toward Dublin, the other west toward New Ross. The group sent toward New Ross suffered nearly 2,000 deaths. They attacked on 5 June and took most of the town. Fierce street fighting commenced, with huge casualties. The Croppies retreated after a counterattack when they ran out of ammunition. This group was practically dismantled after the Battle of New Ross and gradually dwindled.

John Kelly of Killanne was under orders from Bagenal Harvey to attack military outposts held by Crown forces around New Ross but on no account to attack the town itself. The rebels outnumbered the Crown forces and so a messenger was sent out under a white flag to give them a chance to surrender. When this messenger was shot carrying the white flag, the rebels attacked.

Kelly's column of 800 men attacked and broke through New Ross's "Three Bullet Gate" and into the town. Kelly was wounded in the groin as they retreated. He was brought to his sister's house in Wexford, but after the fall of Wexford on 21 June, he was dragged from his bed, and was hanged on 25 June 1798 along with seven other rebel leaders, on Wexford Bridge. His body was decapitated, the trunk thrown into the River Slaney and the head kicked through the streets before being set on display on a spike. According to Jonah Barrington's memoirs, Kelly's sister looked out through her lace curtains on hearing a commotion and saw the Yeomen playing football with her brother's head.

It was after this battle that the infamous massacre of Scullabogue occurred. Rebel soldiers had previously gathered approximately 200 civilian men women and children in an outbuilding on a farm close to the battle, suspecting them of being loyal to the Crown. Word came from New Ross that the Yeomen had attacked and burned rebel first aid stations in New Ross. On hearing this, one of the prisoners is said to have played the mocking tune Croppies Lie Down on the uilleann pipes. Some of the rebels barred the doors and set the barn alight, burning to death all but two of those trapped inside. After several victories, the second rebel group was defeated at Arklow, which would have been a significant victory, but was lost on 9 June due to a lack of ammunition.

== End and aftermath ==
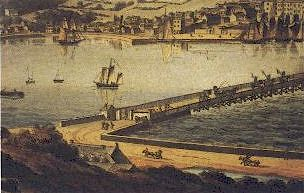
Wexford bridge

The Wexford Croppies finally faced defeat after General Lake launched several attacks. As rain poured on the county for the first time since the rebellion began, General Lake's men entered the county from five points: Duncannon, New Ross, Newtownbarry, Carnew and Arklow. By 20 June, the surviving rebels were pushed back to Vinegar Hill. During this period one of the rebel leaders, Thomas Dixon, based in Wexford Town, killed 100 local people suspected of being loyalists, rounding them up on Wexford bridge and running them through with pikes and throwing their corpses in the river.

General Lake took Enniscorthy and Vinegar Hill on 21 June, despite a gallant defence led by William Barker and Fr Moses Kearns, and eventually pushed all the way into Wexford town where the republic was dismantled and rebels fled. Many of the significant leaders of the Rising, both politically and on the battlefield, were captured and executed. This included Father John Murphy who was hanged at Tullow, Matthew Keogh the rebel governor of Wexford Town, hanged on Wexford bridge on 25 June, and Bagenal Harvey the commander-in-chief in Wexford, Cornelius Grogan and John Henry Colclough who were hanged on Wexford Bridge on 28 June 1798. William Barker escaped back to France.

Local historian William Sweetman published a collection of the transcripts of the 1798 trials in 2013.

== Causes of the rebellion ==
After the suppression of the rebellion by the British Crown, it was widely held in Ireland that the Wexford Rebellion was fuelled by sectarian tensions between Catholics and Protestants. However, throughout the rebellion, prominent rebel leaders claimed that the rebellion was motivated by purely political reasons and not an issue of religion. Although some massacres that occurred throughout the duration of the rebellion do suggest sectarian tensions as motives, the fact that the United Irishmen were both Protestant and Catholic, in addition to the republic formed in county Wexford, suggests that this rebellion was indeed political. Grain prices collapsed in 1797 and 1798, in part due to the imposition of new taxes on the malt industry, causing hardship in many regions, but Wexford especially. Primarily, the rebels fought for a reform of legislature and the redistribution of political power.

== See also ==
- Bagenal Harvey, John Henry Colclough, Cornelius Grogan, Matthew Keogh, Philip Roche, John Kelly of Killanne - Insurgent leaders hanged on Wexford bridge, 25/28 June 1798
- Anthony Perry, Mogue Kearns, John Murphy, Michael Murphy - Other insurgent leaders.
