= Matthew Keogh =

Matthew Keogh or Keugh or Keough (c. 1744 – 25 June 1798) was the United Irish governor of Wexford town during the Irish rebellion of 1798. Held responsible for a massacre of loyalists in the town, he was hanged following its recapture by Crown forces.

He was born in Ireland around 1744 and joined the British Army as a private soldier. He was promoted to Ensign and gazetted to the King's 60th Regiment of Foot in 1763. He was promoted to Lieutenant in the King's 45th Regiment of Foot in 1765 and finally transferred to the 27th (Inniskilling) Regiment of Foot in 1772, retiring as a captain-lieutenant in 1774. He saw action in North America.

When the Wexford Rebellion began in 1798 he was living in Wexford as a freeman of the town, possibly engaged in shipping. He had been appointed a justice of the peace for County Wexford but deprived of his seat on the bench in 1796 for alleged revolutionary sympathies. On 31 May 1798, when the rebel forces of the United Irishmen occupied the town of Wexford, a representative Directory, or Council of the People, was formed to administer the town and county. Matthew Keogh was elected Cathaoirleach or presiding officer, effectively Military Governor of the county. He subsequently failed however, in spite of his good intentions, to prevent a mob from slaughtering nearly 100 local loyalists with pikes after mock trials on Wexford bridge on 20 June.

When the British force retook the town a few days later he was put on trial with other local leaders and sentenced to death. The sentence was carried out on 25 June 1798 when he and the other defendants were hanged on Wexford bridge and their bodies thrown into the River Slaney. Keogh's corpse was beheaded and his head stuck on a spike at the courthouse.

== See also ==
- Wexford Rebellion of 1798
- Bagenal Harvey, John Henry Colclough, Cornelius Grogan, Philip Roche, John Kelly of Killanne – Rebel leaders hanged on Wexford bridge, 25/28 June 1798
