= Bagenal Harvey =

Barrister and United Irishman commander

Beauchamp Bagenal Harvey (died 28 June 1798) was a barrister and a commander of the United Irishmen in the Battle of New Ross during the 1798 Rebellion.

Portrait of Harvey, 19th century.

He was the eldest son of Francis Harvey of Bargy Castle, Wexford, who was one of the six Clerks in Chancery, and his wife and cousin Nartha Harvey. Bagenal was educated at Trinity College, Dublin. During his years in Dublin he entered a relationship with Elizabeth Smith, with whom he had two sons.

He was a Protestant who was known for his liberal principles and as a supporter of Catholic emancipation. From June 1792 he was a member of the Dublin Society of United Irishmen, founded by James Napper Tandy and Archibald Hamilton Rowan.

Just before the outbreak of the 1798 Rebellion Harvey was arrested at his home on 26 May 1798 at 11.00 p.m. A rebel colonel, Anthony Perry, divulged the information after giving in to torture by Crown forces. He was imprisoned at Wexford Gaol until its occupation by the rebels, and on his liberation, he was appointed Commander-in-Chief of the rebel forces, perhaps against his will. His first plan was to advance westwards via New Ross into County Kilkenny in hope of finding new supporters for the rebellion.

== Battle of New Ross ==
Harvey was in command at the Battle of New Ross on 5 June 1798, in which the rebels were defeated. The rebels outnumbered the Crown forces and had a rebel emissary Matt Furlong deliver surrender terms. While bearing a flag of truce Furlong was shot, prompting 500 of the rebels under John Kelly of Killanne to charge. The attack had some initial success with two-thirds of the town in possession of the United Irishmen. They quickly ran out of ammunition and were forced to rely on their pikes. With the arrival of government reinforcements, the rebels were defeated.

== Flight, arrest and execution ==
On 7 June Harvey resigned at Sliabh Coillte, disgusted with his defeat and the ensuing Scullabogue Barn massacre. He was replaced as Commander-in-Chief by Philip Roche and returned to Wexford where he was appointed President of the town committee. Confident that a treaty would be negotiated on the rebels' behalf by Lord Kingsborough, the loyalist captured with some of the North Cork Militia, he retired to his family home at Bargy Castle. Shortly afterwards he and John Henry Colclough, dressed as peasants, travelled to a cave on the Greater Saltee Island from whence they planned to escape to republican France.

Depiction of Harvey’s capture on the Saltee Islands by British soldiers.

They were, however, betrayed and Harvey was arrested by Ralph James, an officer of the Irish Yeomanry, and brought to Wexford town. He was tried, convicted and hanged on Wexford bridge on 28 June 1798, with Colclough, Roche and Cornelius Grogan. His body was afterwards beheaded, the trunk thrown into the River Slaney and the head displayed on a spike on the courthouse.

His corpse was recovered by his friends and buried in Mayglass cemetery, near Mountpleasant House, the house he lived in before he died. He was unmarried and succeeded by his brother James, who recovered the attainted family estates 12 years later.

In his memoirs Jonah Barrington listed Harvey as a rebel supporter in April 1798, before the rebellion started. Thomas Collins, the government spy in the Dublin Society of United Irishmen, had also informed Dublin Castle about his republican views as early as 1793.

The Rev John Graham wrote in his diary for 16 June 1798, "The Wexford Rebels have taken the command away from Bagenal Harvey and given it to one Clinch, a Popish Priest", so it may be that Harvey did not resign his commission. Father Clinch of Enniscorthy was killed on 21 June on the retreat from Vinegar Hill.

== Family ==
Harvey secretly married in 1797 Judith Dockrell, but his only known children were from his liaison with Elizabeth Smith. He was a cousin of the founder of Bagenalstown in County Carlow, and was an ancestor of General Beauchamp Doran.

== See also ==
- Wexford Rebellion of 1798
- John Henry Colclough, Cornelius Grogan, Matthew Keogh, Philip Roche, John Kelly of Killanne - Rebel leaders hanged on Wexford bridge, 25/28 June 1798
