= Edward Hay (County Wexford) =

Edward Hay (1761–1826) was the author of a book on the Irish Rebellion of 1798, and a witness to many of the events of that time.

== Early life ==
Edward Hay was born, about 1761, at Ballinkeele, Ballymurn, County Wexford, Ireland, into a Catholic family. His family were large landowners and were long-established in the County. Hay was educated in France and Germany. His father was Harvey Hay.

== Rebellion ==
Hay was witness to many of the events in Wexford town during the Rebellion. Hay's brother, John, was a prominent Rebel leader, who was executed near the end of the Rebellion on Wexford bridge, 26 June 1798. John Hay was buried in Kilmallock graveyard, County Wexford. Another brother, Philip, was a member of the British Army, and was buried in England.

Edward Hay was tried for involvement in the Rebellion but was acquitted. It is clear from Hay's own account and from Miles Byrne's Memoirs that Edward Hay himself had little involvement in the actual fighting, but his actual role in organizing and promoting the Rebellion is far less certain.

== Book ==
Hay's book was first published in 1803 as "History of the Insurrection of the County of Wexford, A. D. 1798". This was one of the first accounts of the Rebellion. It was reprinted many times, usually under the slightly altered title of "History of the Irish insurrection of 1798", presumably to appeal to a wider audience. Most of these reprints omit Hay's 1803 Introduction and Appendix, as well as his large fold-out map of County Wexford. Hay's original 1803 book is now scarce, but is now available on the Internet - less the map. However, an exact copy of his map was reprinted in Wheeler and Broadley's, "The War in Wexford: An Account of the Rebellion in the South of Ireland in 1798" (London & New York, 1910).

== Dublin ==
Hay lived in Dublin in his later years and was a prominent member of the Catholic Committee and a very active member of the Catholic Association. He was Secretary of the Catholic Association, 1806 - 1819.

== Biographies ==
Margaret Ó hÓgartaigh produced both a thesis and a biography of Edward Hay.

The Wexford historian, William Sweetman, published a biography of Edward Hay in 2019

== Death ==
Edward Hay died at Dublin on 13 October 1826, and is buried in St. James' graveyard, Kilmainham, Dublin, where his headstone can still be seen.
