= Battle of Foulksmills =

- Part of the Irish Rebellion of 1798
Date	20 June 1798
Location	Foulkesmill, County Wexford
Result	British victory

Belligerents
United Irishmen	Kingdom of Great Britain: Kingdom of Ireland

Commanders and leaders
Philip Roche	John Moore

Strength
~2,000	~2,500–5,000

Casualties and losses
~300 killed or wounded	~300 killed or wounded

The Battle of Foulksmills, known locally as the Battle of Horetown and also known as the Battle of Goff's Bridge, took place during the Irish Rebellion of 1798. 2,000 Crown troops under John Moore defeated a force of 3,000 United Irishmen rebels in County Wexford.

== Background ==
By 19 June the threat of the United Irish rebellion spreading outside county Wexford had been largely contained and Crown forces were positioned to move against rebel held territory. A force of about 2,500 men under Sir John Moore moved out of New Ross towards Wexford as part of an overall encirclement operation in conjunction with General Gerard Lake's forces moving from the north.

Moore's force was to link up and combine with the isolated garrison holding Duncannon before moving deeper into County Wexford, but after waiting several hours with no sign of their arrival, Moore decided to press ahead to the village of Taghmon alone. Upon nearing Goffs Bridge at Foulkesmill, his scouts reported a rapidly moving force of some 3,000 rebels moving quickly along the road with the intent to give battle. Moore despatched a detachment of the 60th Regiment of Foot to hold the bridge until artillery could be brought up in support.

== Battle ==
The rebel force, led by Philip Roche, spotted this move and moved away from the road to the high ground on the left intending to outflank Moore's troops. The 60th Foot were forced to engage the rebels on the roads, fields and forests of the area and the rebel flanking move briefly threatened to overturn Moore's left. Moore had to personally rally his fleeing troops to hold the line and led them in a successful counter-attack. As more troops began to arrive the rebels were flushed out of their concealed positions, allowing the artillery to be brought into play and the rebels' move was foiled. The rebels were gradually pushed back field by field but were able to withdraw the bulk of their force safely.

== Aftermath ==
Both sides suffered approximately 300 killed or wounded. As a result of the victory, the road to Wexford was opened and the town was recaptured the next day, but during this battle, rebels under the rebel commander Thomas Dixon massacred between 35 and 100 loyalist prisoners at Wexford bridge.

== Sources ==
"The Peoples Rising -Wexford in 1798" (1995) - Daniel Gahan ISBN 0-7171-2323-5
"Ireland 1798: The Battles" - Art Kavanagh, ISBN 0-9524785-4-4
