= Battle of New Ross (1798) =

Battle of the Irish Rebellion of 1798

Coordinates: 52.3956°N 6.9450°W

- Part of the Irish Rebellion of 1798
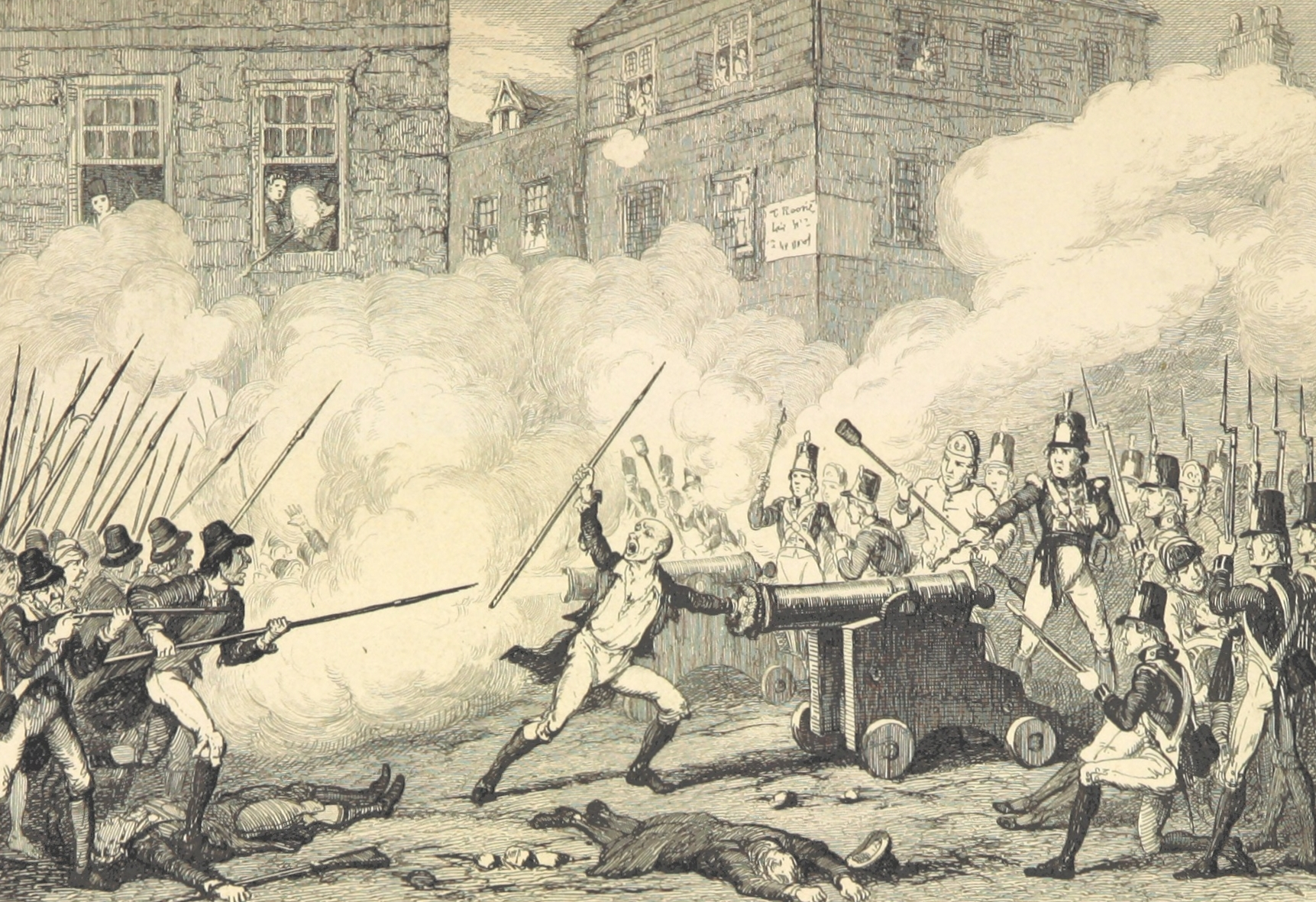
- 1845 illustration of the battle
| Date | 5 June 1798 |
| Location | New Ross, County Wexford |
| Result | British victory |

Belligerents
| Ireland; Great Britain | United Irishmen |

Commanders and leaders
| Sir Henry Johnson; Lord Mountjoy † | Bagenal Harvey; John Kelly (WIA); Philip Roche |

Strength
| 2,000 | 3,000 |

Casualties and losses
| c. 230 | c. 1,000–2,800 |

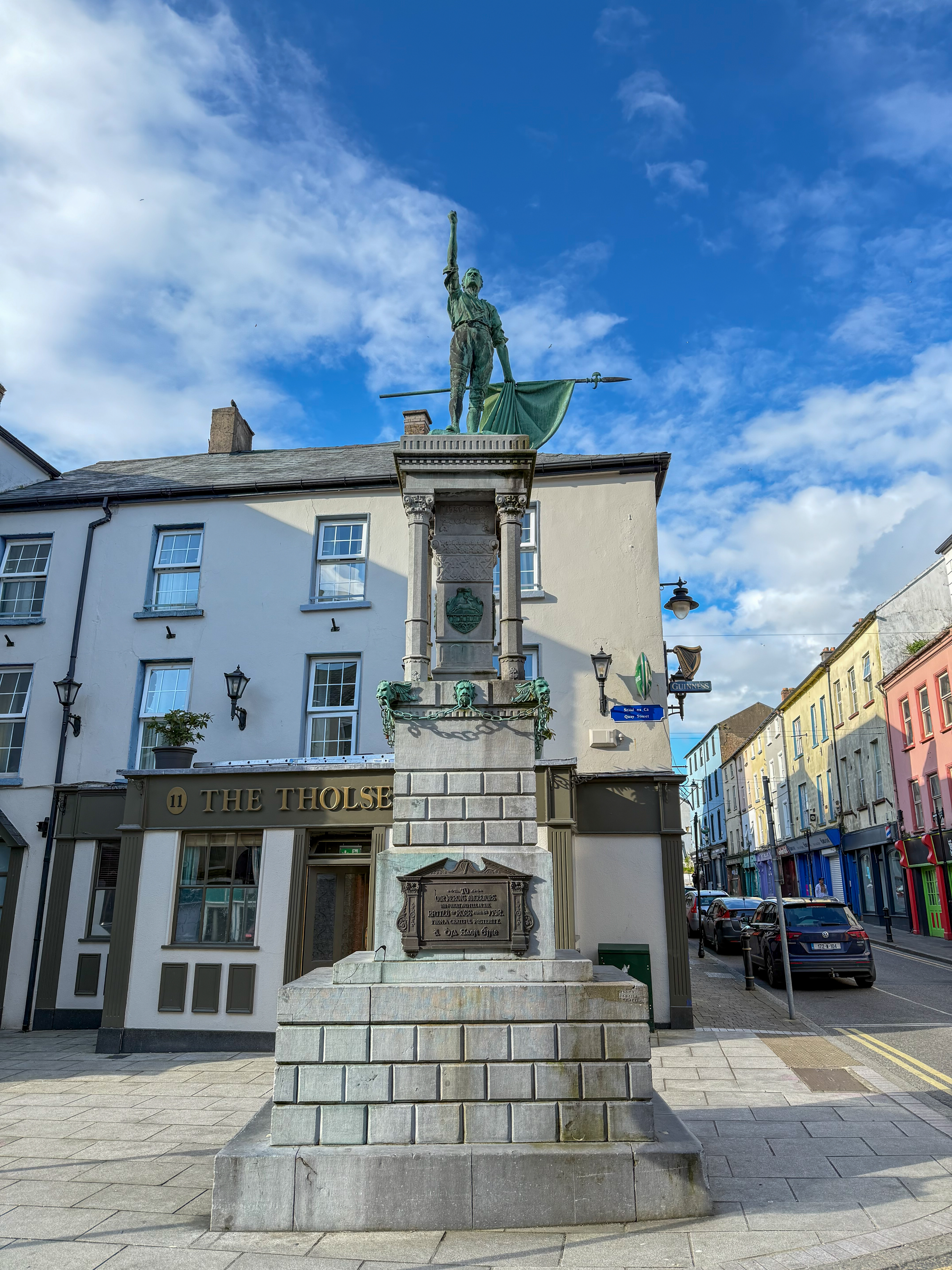
1798 Monument, New Ross

The Battle of New Ross was a military engagement which took place in New Ross, County Wexford during the Irish Rebellion of 1798. It was fought between the Society of United Irishmen rebels and government forces garrisoning the town. The attack on the town of New Ross on the River Barrow, was an attempt by the recently victorious rebels to break out of county Wexford across the river Barrow and to spread the rebellion into county Kilkenny and the nearby province of Munster.

== Background ==
On 4 June 1798, the rebels advanced from their camp on Carrigbyrne Hill to Corbet Hill, just outside New Ross town. The battle, the bloodiest of the 1798 rebellion, began at dawn on 5 June 1798 when the Crown garrison was attacked by a force of approximately 3,000 rebels, massed in three columns outside the town. The attack had been expected since the fall of Wexford town to the rebels on 30 May and the garrison, consisting of 2,000 troops, had prepared defences both outside and inside the town. Trenches were dug and manned by skirmishers on the approaches to the town while cannon were stationed facing all the rapidly falling approaches and narrow streets of the town to counter the expected mass charges by the rebels, who were mainly armed with pikes.

== Battle ==
The Three Bullet Gate

Bagenal Harvey, a United Irishmen commander who had recently been released from captivity following the capture of Wexford by a rebel force, attempted to negotiate the surrender of New Ross. However, the emissary he sent, Matt Furlong, was killed by government forces while approaching an outpost outside the town bearing a flag of truce. His death provoked a furious charge by an advance guard of 500 rebels led by John Kelly, who had instructions to seize the Three Bullet Gate and wait for reinforcements before pushing into the rest of the town. To aid their attack, the rebels first drove a herd of cattle through the gate. Another rebel column attacked the Priory Gate but the third pulled back from the Market Gate intimidated by the strong defences. Seizing the opportunity the garrison sent a force of cavalry out the Market Gate to attack and scatter the remaining two hostile columns from the flanks. However the rebel rump had not yet deployed and upon spotting this manoeuvre, rallied the front ranks who stood and broke the cavalry charge with massed pikes.

The encouraged rebel army then swept past the Crown outposts and seized the Three Bullet Gate causing the garrison and populace to flee in panic. Without pausing for reinforcement, the rebels broke into the town attacking simultaneously down the steeply sloping streets but met with strong resistance from well-prepared second lines of defence of the well-armed soldiers. Despite horrific casualties the rebels managed to seize two-thirds of the town by using the cover of smoke from burning buildings and forced the near withdrawal of all Crown forces from the town. However, the rebels' limited supplies of gunpowder and ammunition forced them to rely on the pike and blunted their offensive. The military managed to hold on and following the arrival of reinforcements, launched a counterattack before noon which finally drove the exhausted rebels from the town.

During and after the battle, government forces systematically killed captured and wounded rebels. As noted by American historian Daniel Gahan, both rebels and government troops had perpetrated such atrocities in the past, though sixty-nine rebels were burned alive when a rebel-held aid station, a large house on Mary Street, was set on fire by government troops. James Alexander, an officer in the garrison, wrote in a later account of the battle that "the screams of the terrified doomed men could be clearly heard, despite the noise of the battle, over much of the town." Reports of such atrocities brought by escaping rebels are believed to have influenced the murder of over 100 loyalists in the Scullabogue Barn massacre.

== Aftermath ==
Casualties in the Battle of New Ross are estimated at 2,800 to 3,000 rebels and at least 230 members of the garrison dead, wounded or missing. An Augustinian Friar at New Ross on 5 June 1798, the day of the Battle, entered in the Augustinian Church Mass Book the following in Latin: "Hodie hostis rebellis repulsa est ab obsidione oppidi cum magna caede, puta 3000", ("today, the rebel enemy was driven back from the assault of the town with great slaughter [carnage], estimated at 3000".) A loyalist eye-witness account stated; "The remaining part of the evening (of 5 June 1798) was spent in searching for and shooting the insurgents, whose loss in killed was estimated at two thousand, eight hundred and six men."

The second figure is probably the most accurate of all figures given – it indicates that an attempt to make an accurate count had been made. However, one of the rebel commanders, Thomas Cloney, claimed the rebels had at most 300 killed. Most of the dead rebels were thrown in the River Barrow or buried in a mass grave outside the town walls, a few days after the battle. The remaining rebel elements reorganised and established a camp at Sliabh Coillte some five miles (8 km) to the east but never attempted to attack the town again. They later attacked a column of troops led by General John Moore at the battle of Foulksmills on 20 June 1798 but were defeated.

== Primary sources ==
- John Alexander "A Succinct Narrative of the Rise and Progress of the Rebellion in the County of Wexford, especially in the vicinity of Ross" (1800)
- Thomas Cloney "A Personal Narrative of those Transactions in the County of Wexford, in which the author was engaged, during the awful period of 1798" (1832)
- Edward Hay "History of the Insurrection of County Wexford" (1803)
- Richard Musgrave "Memoirs of the different rebellions in Ireland" (1801)

== Secondary sources ==
- Charles Dickson "The Wexford Rising in 1798: its causes and course" (1955) ISBN 0-09-478390-X
- Daniel Gahan "The Peoples Rising -Wexford in 1798" (1995) ISBN 0-7171-2323-5
- Thomas C. Butler, O.S.A., "Near Restful Waters – The Augustinians in New Ross and Clonmines" (Dublin & Kildare, 1975).
- H.F.B. Wheeler & A.M. Broadley. The War in Wexford – An Account of the Rebellion in the South of Ireland in 1798. London & New York: John Lane, 1910.
