= Wexford Bridge =

Coordinates: 52.34222°N 6.45667°W

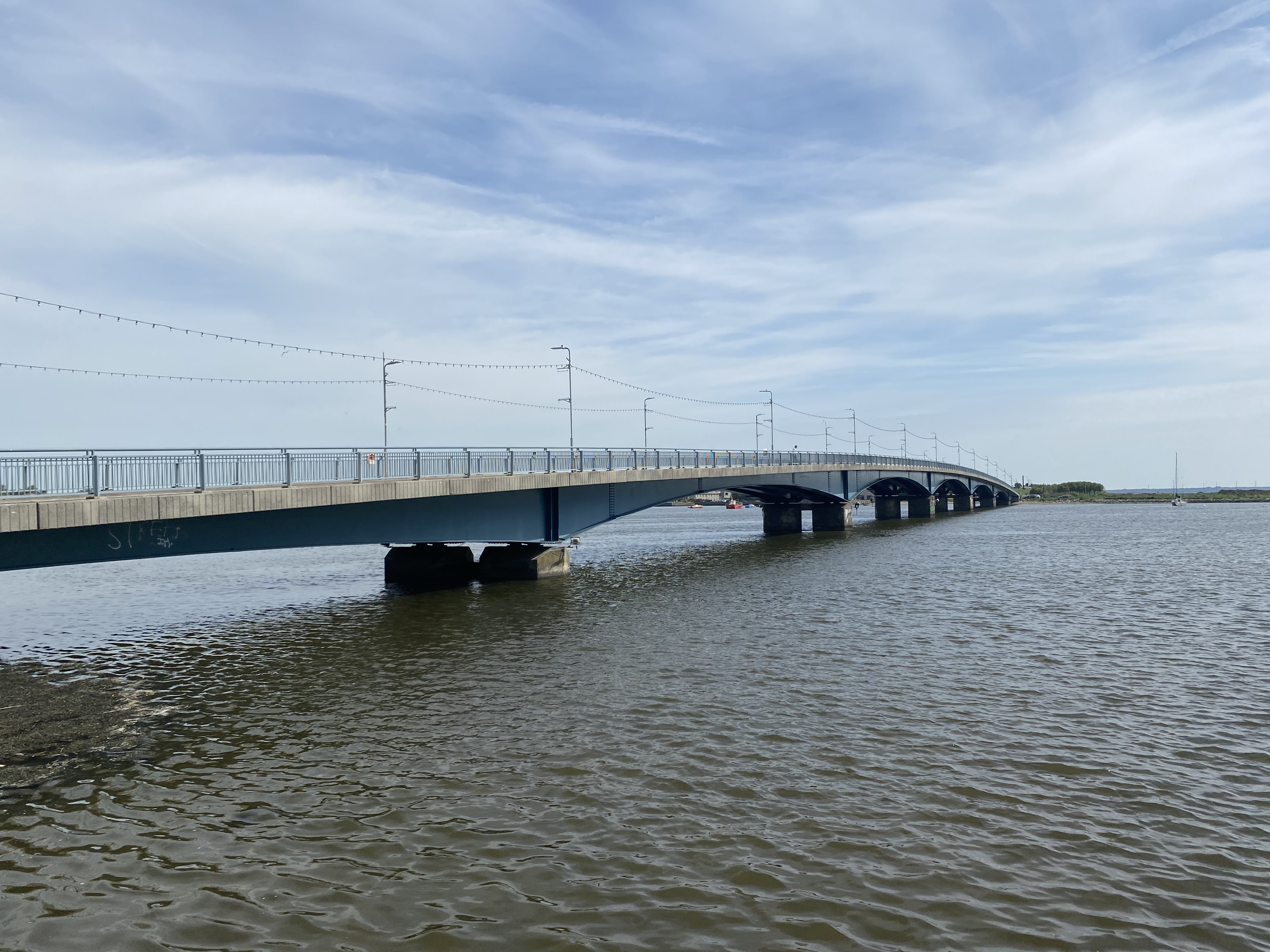
Wexford Bridge, 2021

Wexford Bridge is a road bridge in Wexford, the county town of County Wexford in Ireland. It crosses the mouth of the River Slaney from Wexford town on the west bank to Ferrybank on the east bank. It carries the R741 road from Wexford towards Dublin and the north. The bridge consists of 7 spans of maximum length 63 metres and 12 metres wide, made of continuous steel girders carrying composite concrete slabs. Including the approach roads, the total length of the bridge is 590 metres, of which 380 metres are over water.

The current bridge, the third to be built, was originally opened on 10 September 1959. The first person to cross the bridge after its official opening was the Most Rev. Dr. J. Staunton, Lord Bishop of Ferns. By the 1990s, the bridge was suffering from severe corrosion. In 1997, therefore, over a 10-week period, the whole superstructure was broken up, the piers and abutments reconstructed, and the roadway replaced by composite concrete slabs.

== History ==
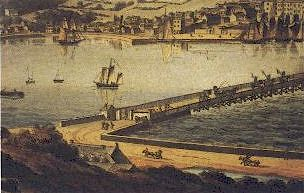
Wexford Bridge circa 1800

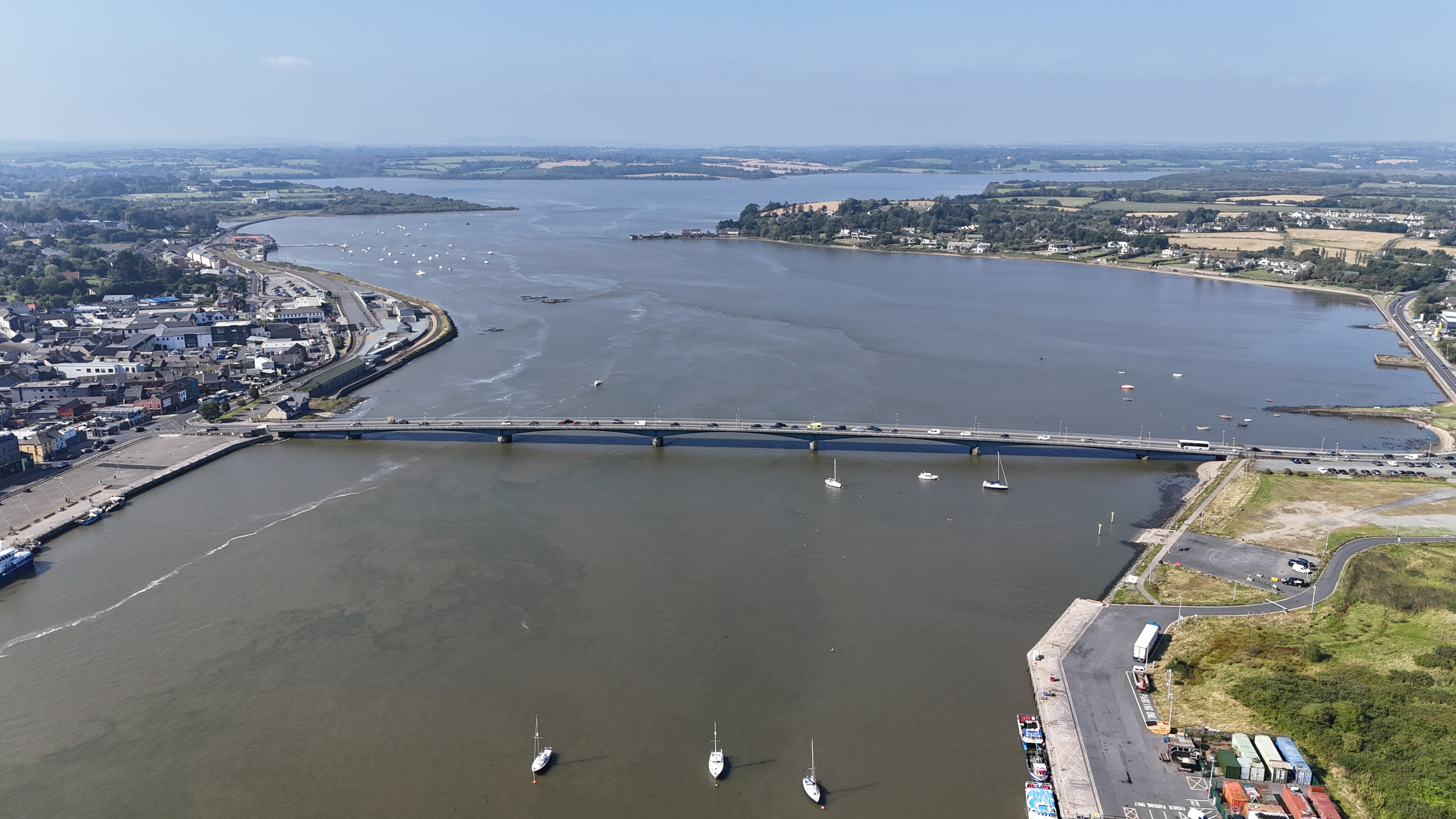
Aerial photograph of Wexford Bridge, 2024

Before the first bridge was built the nearest bridge crossing of the River Slaney was at Enniscorthy, approximately 20 km upstream, although a number of ferry crossings operated at various points.

Construction of the first bridge by Lemuel Cox, an American, started in June 1794 and was completed the following year. It was constructed in wood with a breadth of some 10 metres. In 1827 a portion of the bridge collapsed into the river and in 1866 the whole structure was demolished after a new bridge had been built.

The first bridge became infamous as the setting for a massacre of nearly 100 local Loyalists by pikemen of the Society of United Irishmen during the Irish Rebellion of 1798. The victims were taken from custody to the bridge, speared by pikes and thrown into the river. As part of the recriminations after the rebellion had been put down, a number of rebel ringleaders were hanged on the bridge, beheaded and their corpses thrown into the river.

The new bridge was constructed about a kilometre upstream at Carcur, where the river was much wider. By the 1950s, however, the new bridge was unable to support heavy motor traffic and was itself demolished in 1959. In the meantime a third bridge, the current bridge, was constructed by a Dutch firm on the site of the original first bridge and completed by 1959. Following corrosion problems, the superstructure of this bridge was replaced in 1997 by Ascon Ltd, using prefabricated units made in Italy.

== See also ==
- Wexford Rebellion of 1798
- Bagenal Harvey, John Henry Colclough, Cornelius Grogan, Matthew Keogh, Philip Roche, John Kelly of Killanne - Rebel leaders hanged on Wexford bridge, 25/28 June 1798
