= Wicklow Town Hall =

Municipal building in Wicklow, County Wicklow, Ireland

- Halla an Bhaile Cill Mhantáin
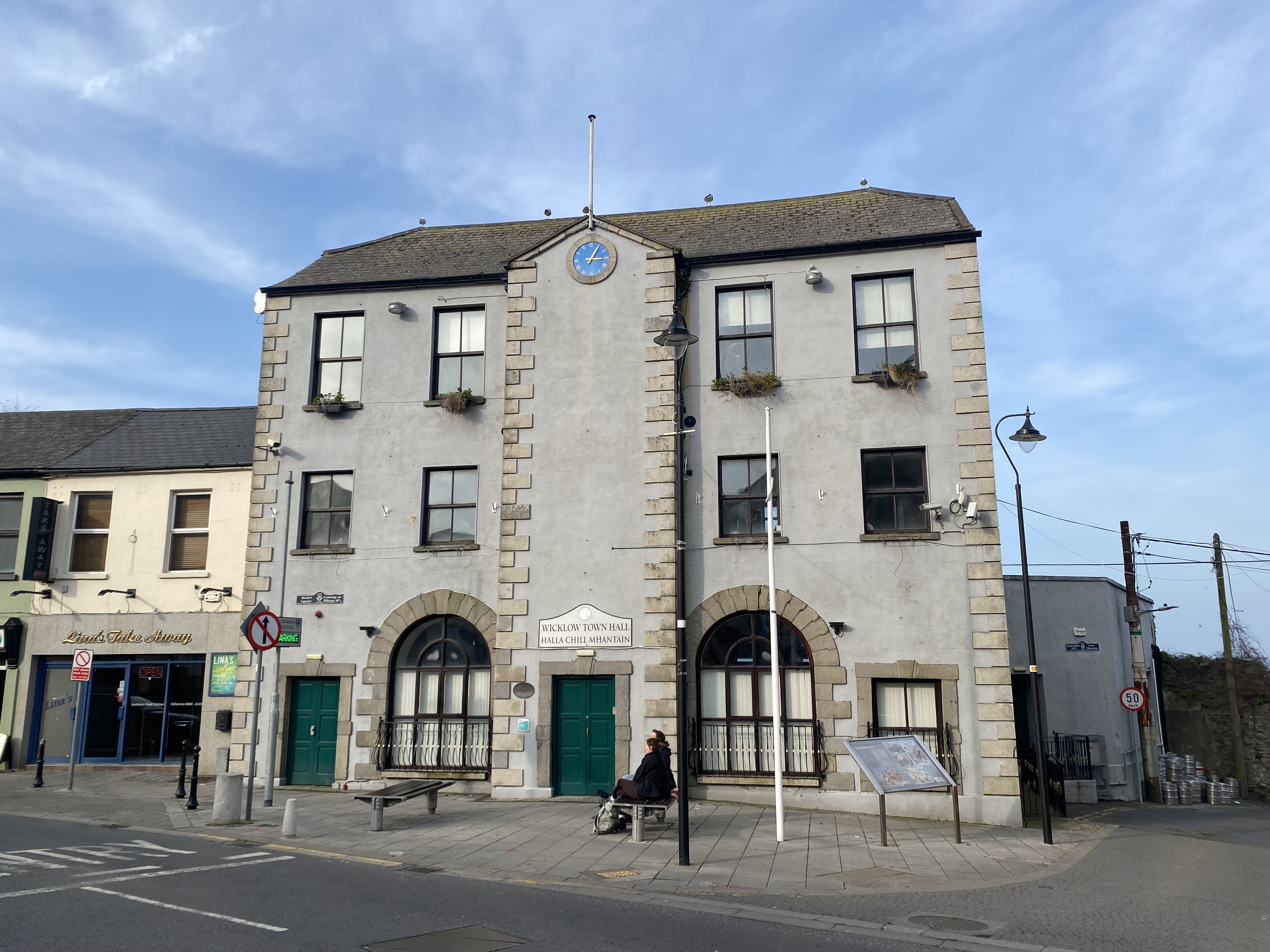
- Wicklow Town Hall in 2025

- Location within Ireland

General information
- Architectural style: Neoclassical style
- Location: Market Square, Wicklow, Ireland
- Coordinates: 52.9798°N 6.0374°W
- Completed: c.1690

Wicklow Town Hall (Irish: Halla an Bhaile Cill Mhantáin), is a municipal building in the Market Square, Wicklow, County Wicklow, Ireland. The building currently accommodates the local offices of Wicklow County Council and the offices of Wicklow County Tourism.

== History ==
The building was commissioned as a market hall and, in part, to accommodate the local free school. It was designed in the neoclassical style, built in brick with a cement render finish and was completed in around 1690. The design involved a symmetrical main frontage of five bays facing onto the Market Square. The central bay, which was slightly projected forward, featured a square headed doorway with an architrave and a keystones on the ground floor, but was blind on the upper two floors and was gabled above. The bays flanking the central bay contained round headed openings with voussoirs on the ground floor and sash windows on the upper floors, while the outer bays contained doorways with architraves and keystones on the ground floor and sash windows on the upper two floors. Internally, the principal room was the market hall.

By the mid-19th century, the market hall was seldom used, farmers preferring to take their trade to other market towns, and the building became the offices and meeting place of the town commissioners. It also became a significant venue for public meetings: the member of parliament and leader of the Home Rule League, Charles Parnell, spoke in the town hall during the 1885 general election. A telephone system was installed in the building in 1898.

In 1899, the town commissioners were replaced by an urban district council, with the town hall becoming the offices of the new council. A statue depicting the local leader of the United Irishmen, Billy Byrne, who was executed for his part in the Irish Rebellion of 1798, was unveiled in front of the town hall, in 1900. A meeting was held in the town hall in April 1915, during the First World War, to instigate a recruiting drive to find local men to join the Royal Dublin Fusiliers.

In July 1920, councillors started to fly the Irish Tricolour from the town hall in a show of support for the Dáil Éireann and then, in November 1920, in the aftermath of Bloody Sunday, when the Black and Tans killed or fatally wounded 14 civilians and wounded at least sixty others at a Gaelic football at Croke Park, the town hall was searched by troops from the Cheshire Regiment, seeking incriminating evidence of councillors supporting the Dáil Éireann.

The building continued to be used as the offices of the urban district council until 2002, and then as the offices of the successor town council. In 2014, the council was dissolved and administration of the town was amalgamated with Wicklow County Council in accordance with the Local Government Reform Act 2014. After some four years, during which the building remained empty and deteriorating, a major programme of refurbishment works was completed in 2018, allowing the building to re-open as the local offices of Wicklow County Council and the offices of Wicklow County Tourism.
