= Wicklow =

Town in County Wicklow, Ireland

Wicklow Cill Mhantáin (Irish)
- Town
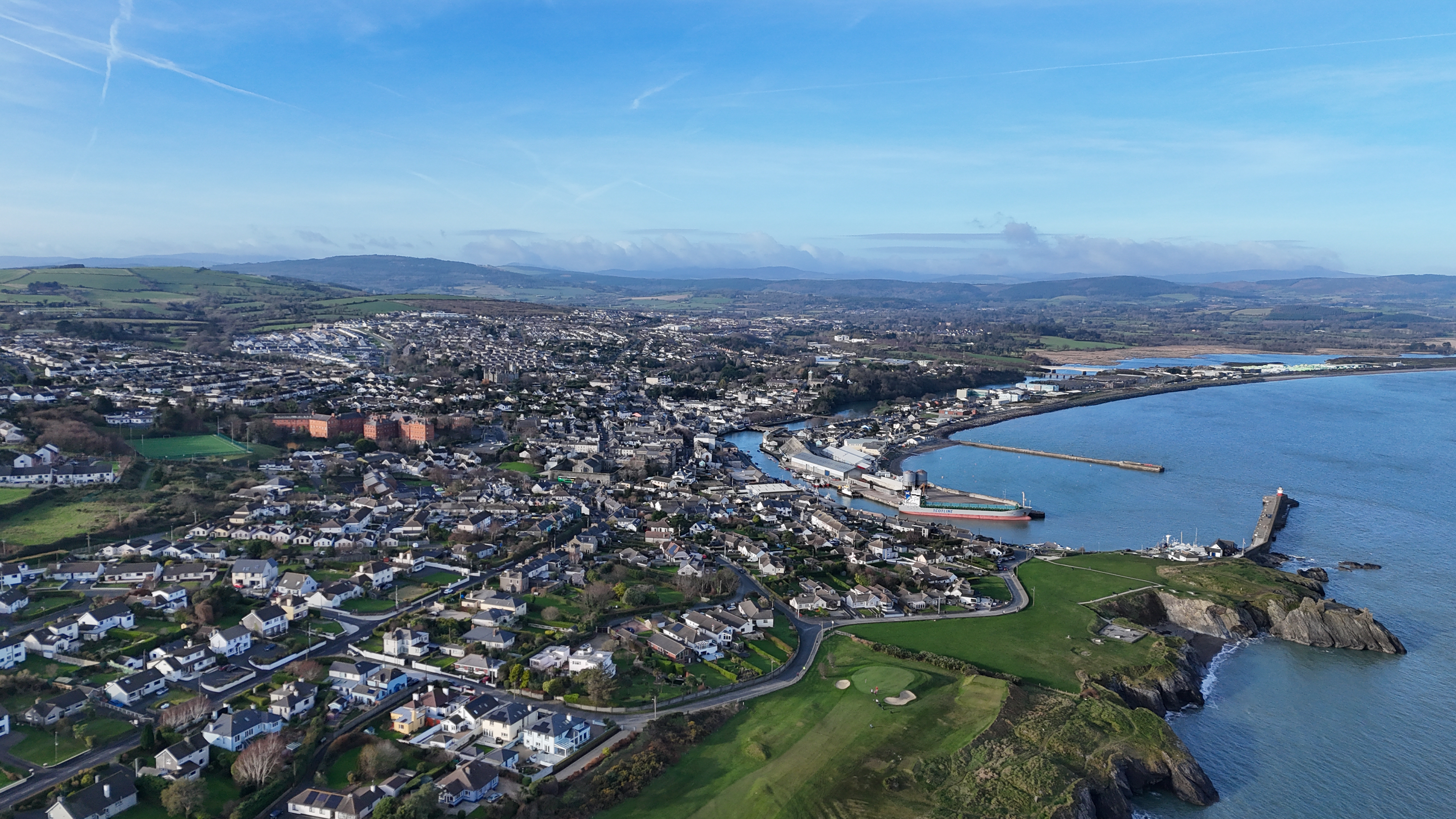
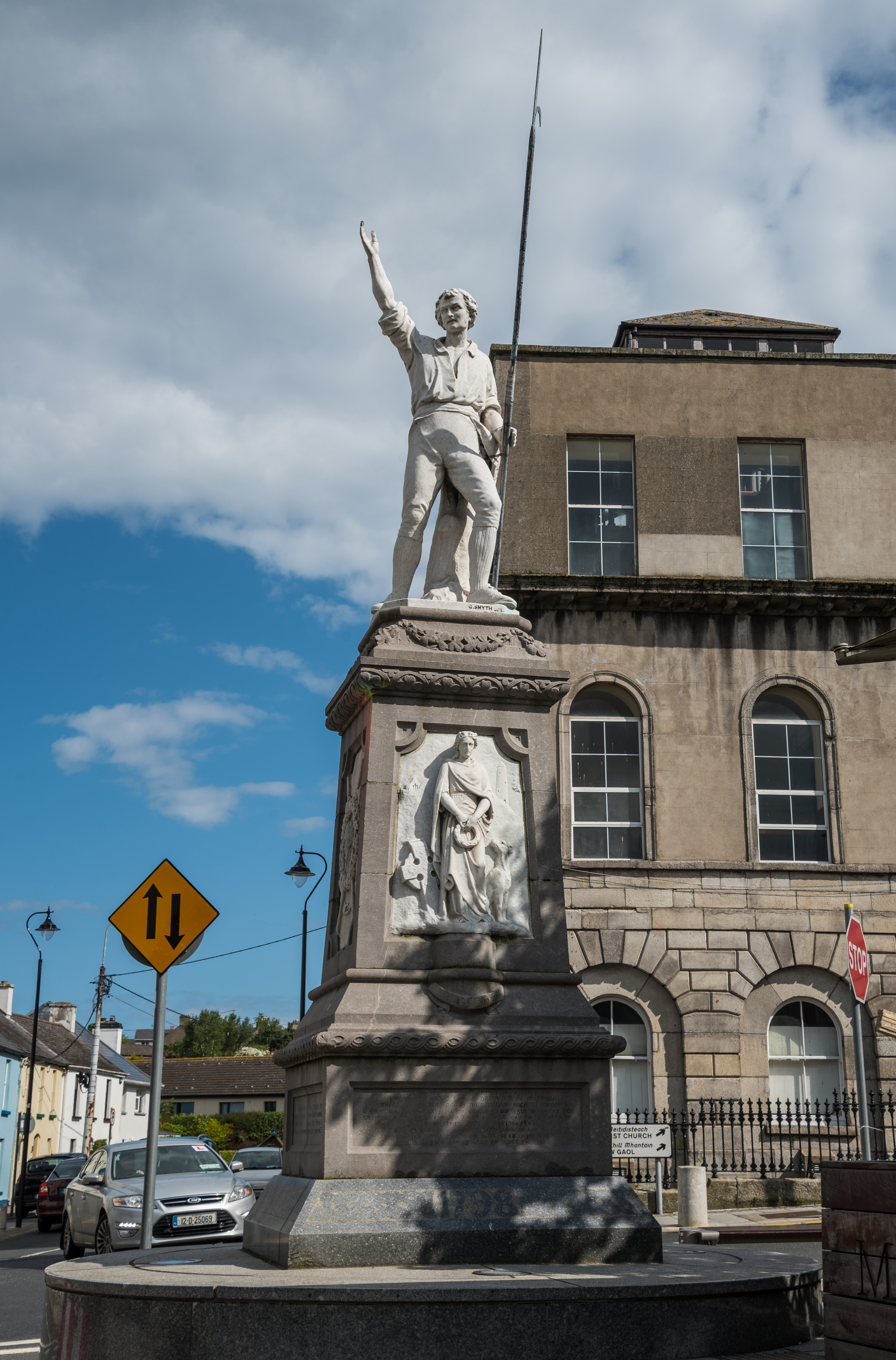
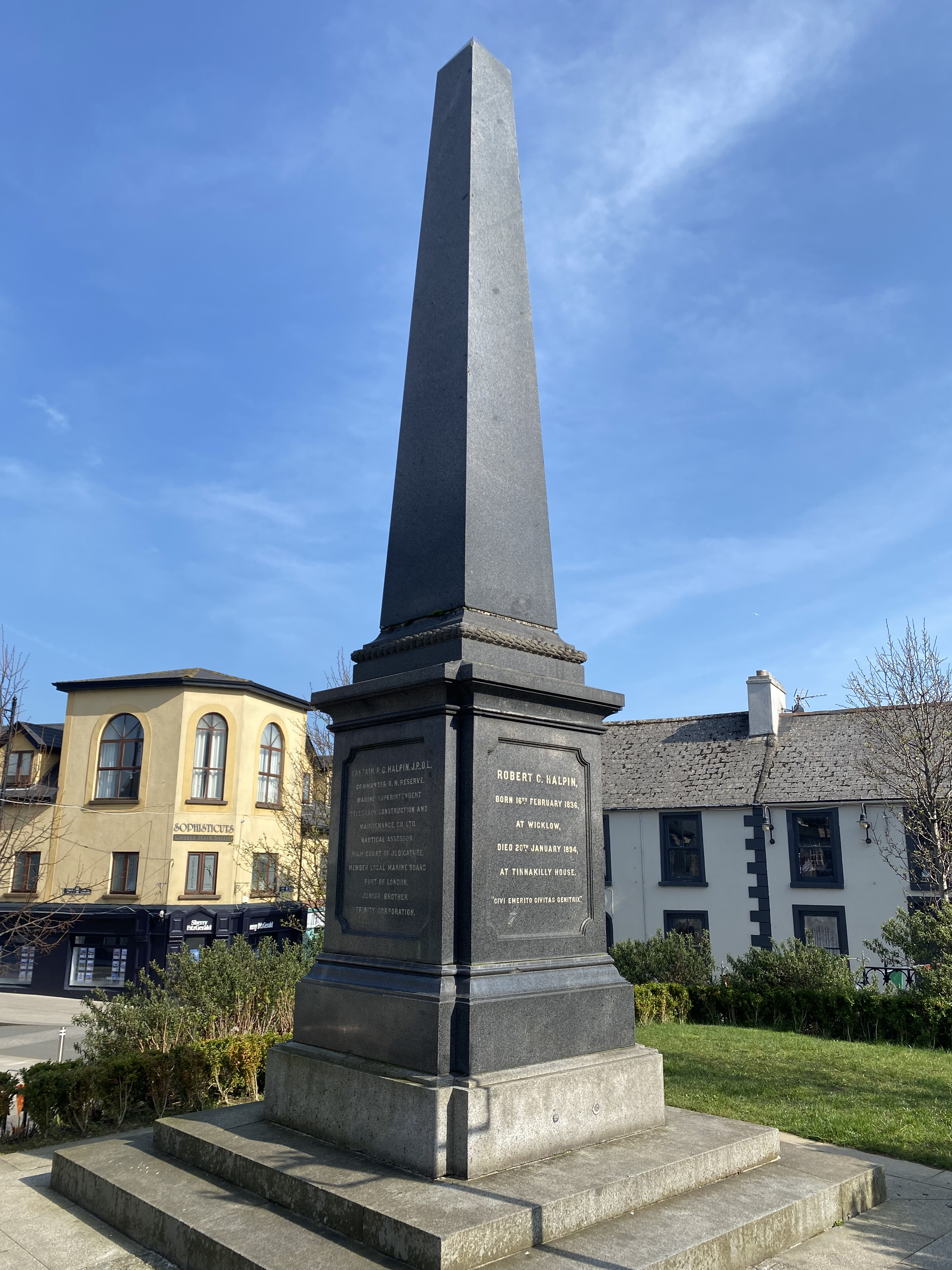
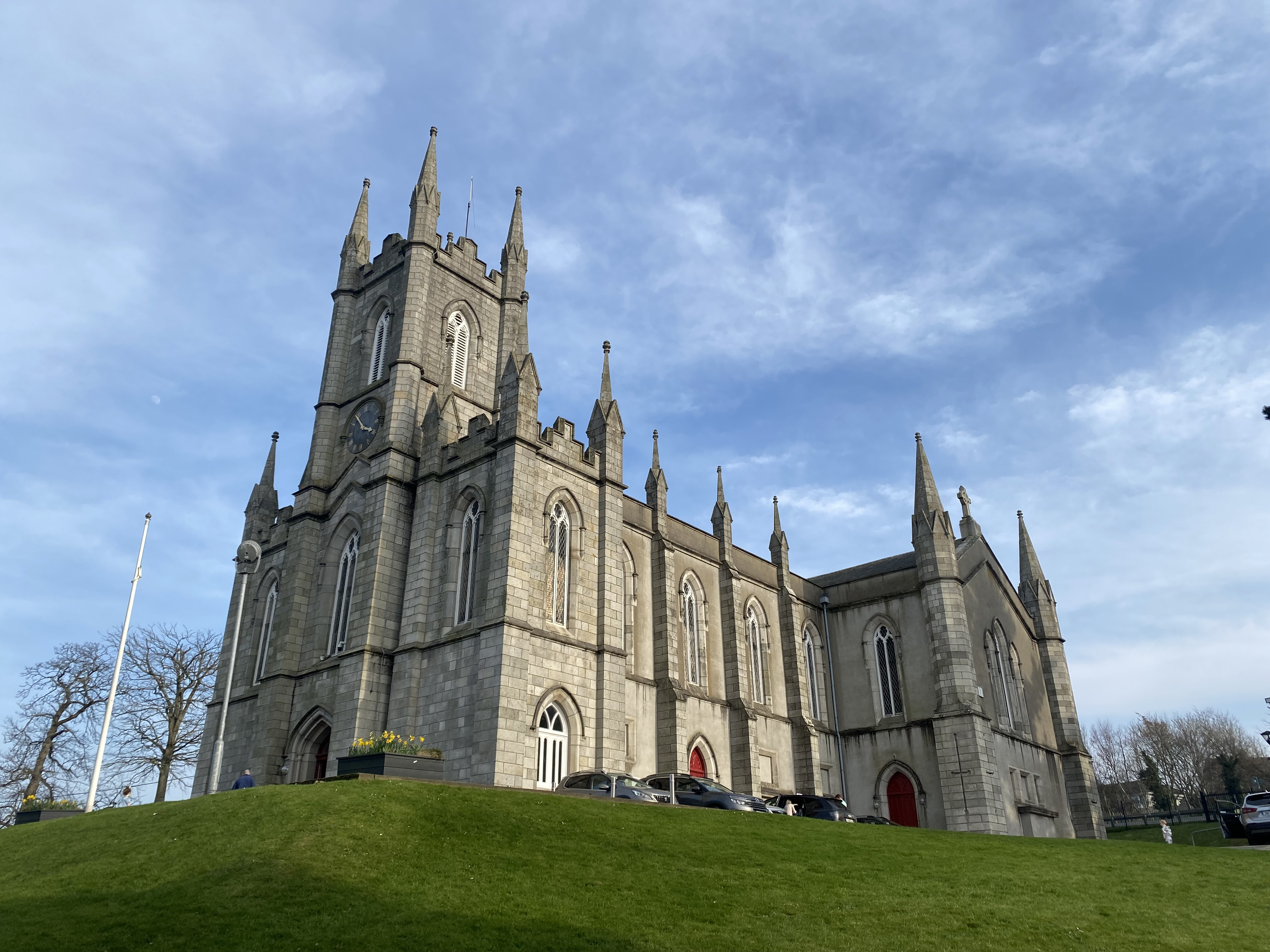
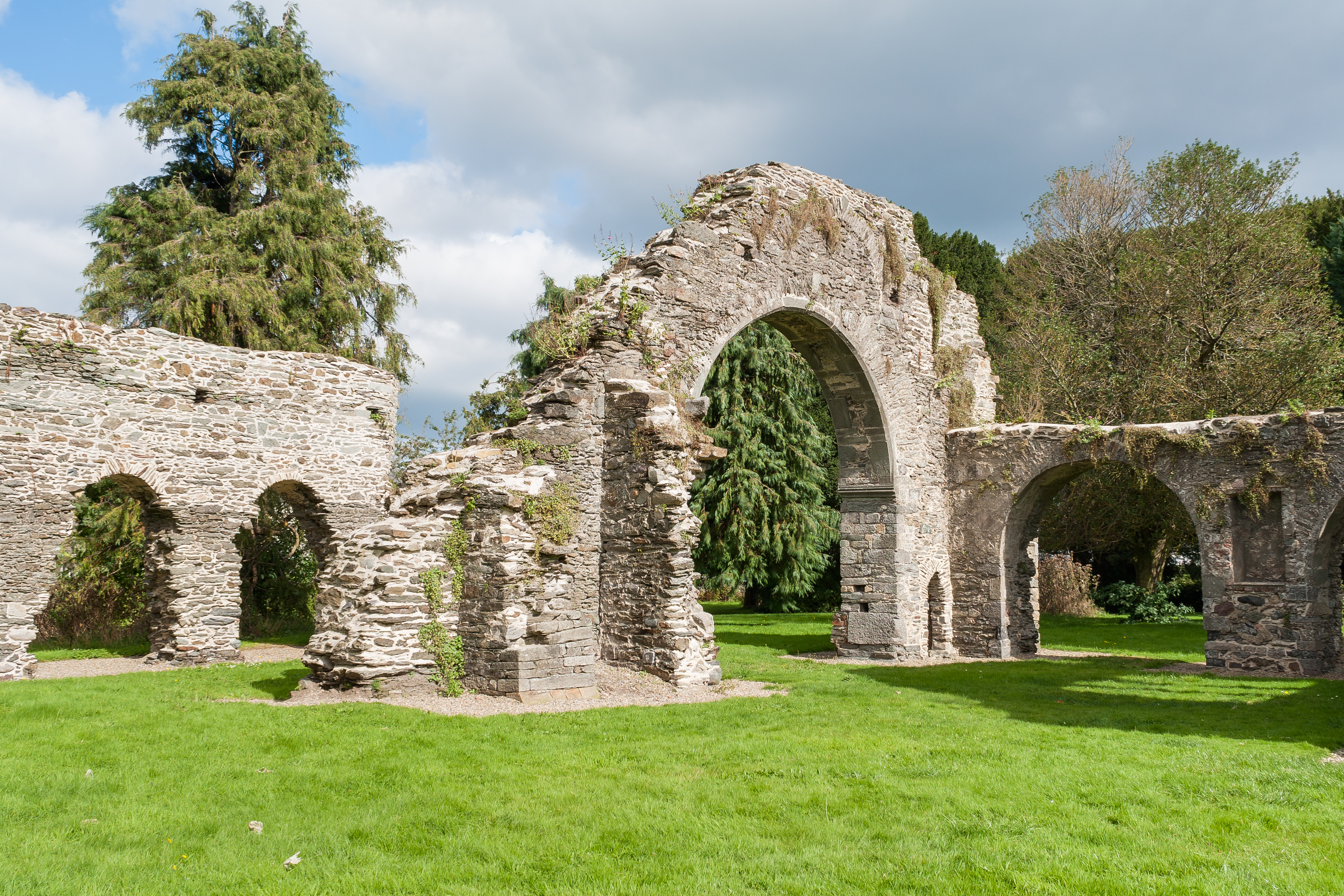
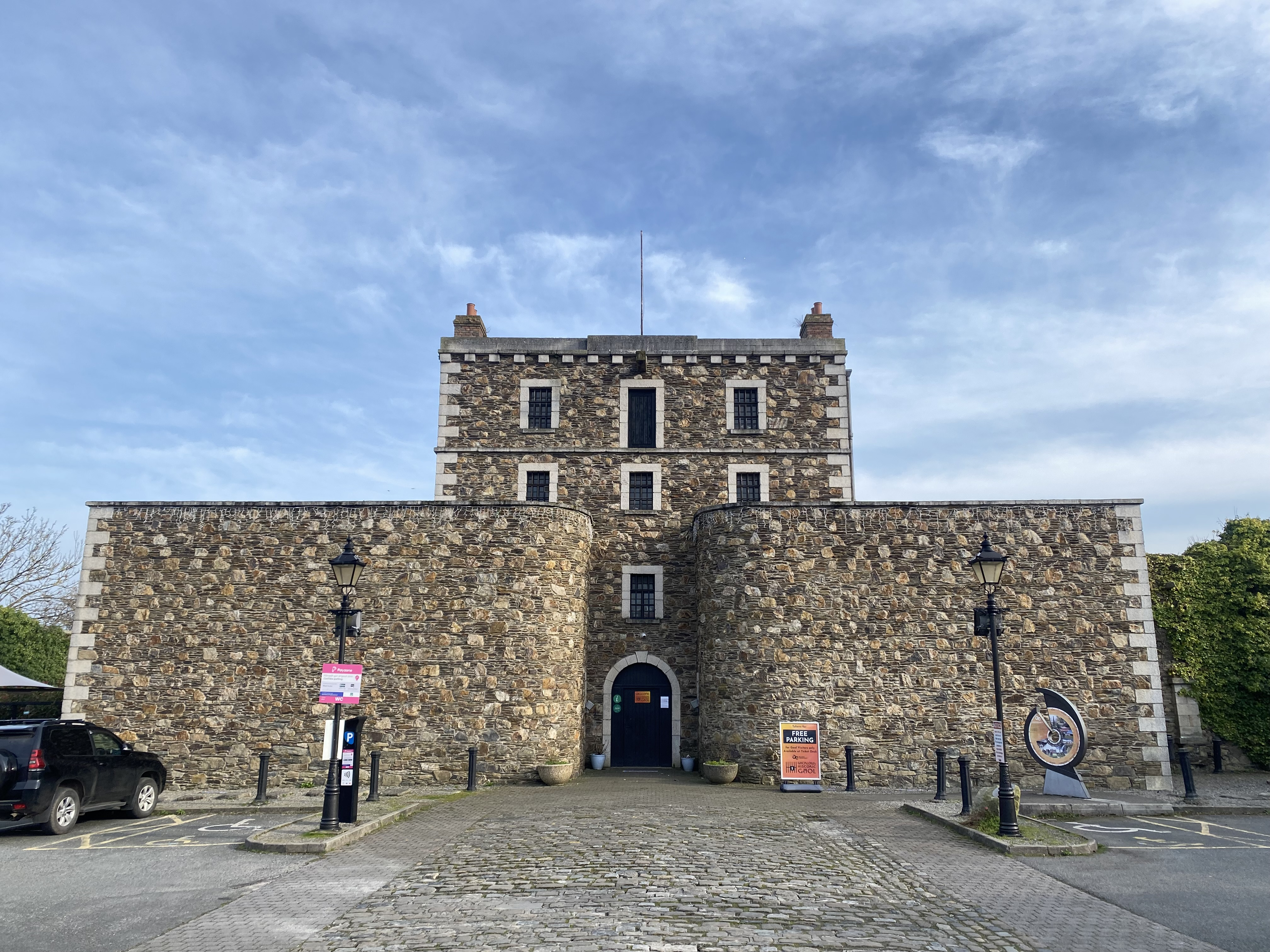
- Town skyline Billy Byrne Monument Halpin Memorial St Patrick's Church Wicklow Friary Wicklow Gaol

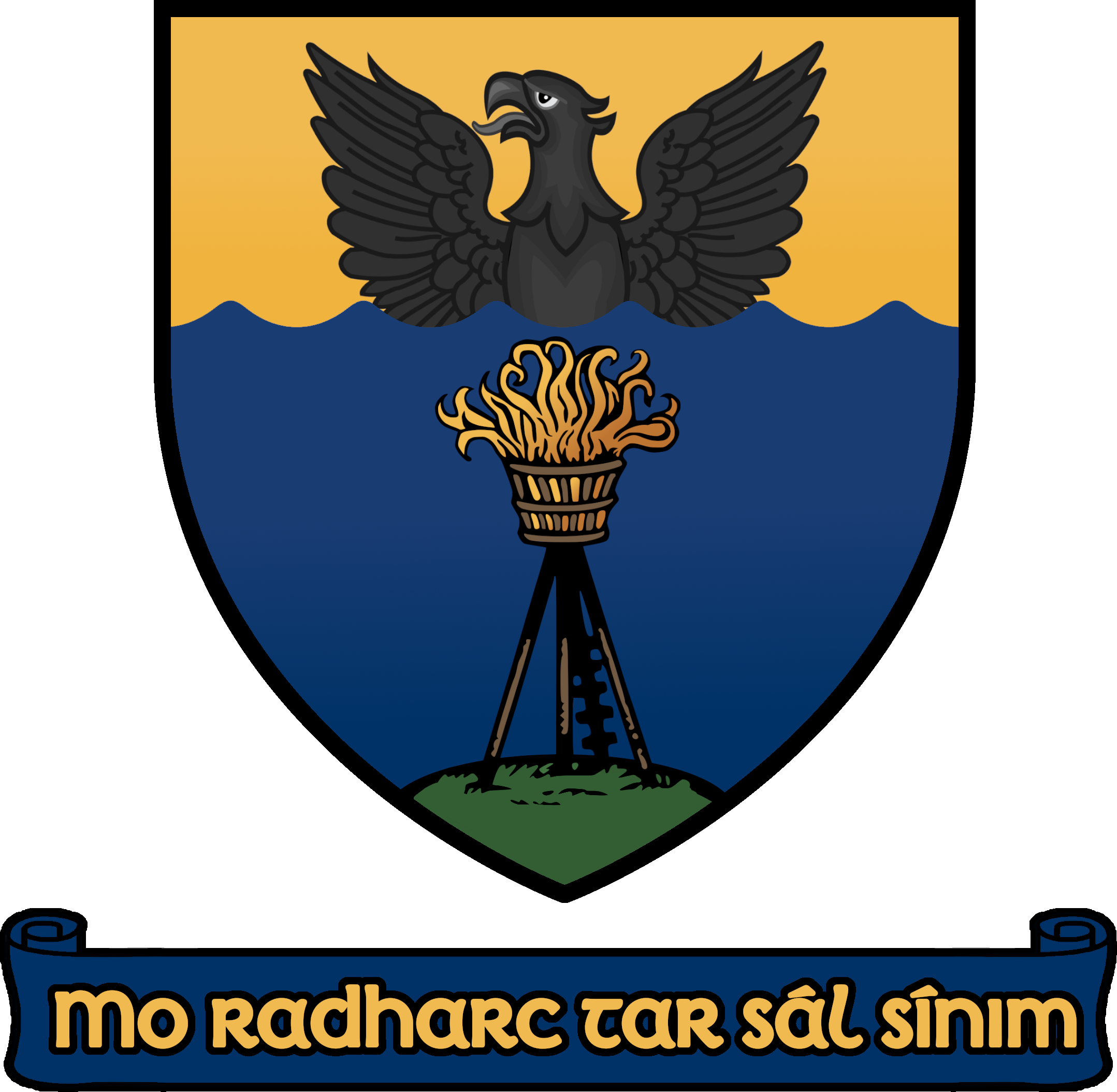
- Coat of arms
- Motto: Mo radharc tar sál sínim
- Location in Ireland
- Coordinates: 52.9779°N 6.033°W
- Country: Ireland
- Province: Leinster
- County: County Wicklow
- Elevation: 69 m (226 ft)

Population (2022)
  - Total: 12,957
- Time zone: UTC±0 (WET)
  - Summer (DST): UTC+1 (IST)
- Eircode routing key: A67
- Telephone area code: +353(0)404
- Irish Grid Reference: T312940
- Website: www.wicklow.ie

Wicklow (/ˈwɪkloʊ/ WIK-loh; Irish: Cill Mhantáin [ˌciːl̠ʲ ˈwan̪ˠt̪ˠaːnʲ], meaning 'church of the toothless one'; Old Norse: Víkingaló) is the county town of County Wicklow in Ireland. It is located on the east coast of Ireland, south of Dublin. According to the 2022 census, it had a population of 12,957 people. The town is to the east of the M11 route between Dublin and Wexford. It also has railway links to Dublin, Wexford, Arklow, and Rosslare Europort. There is also a commercial port for timber and textile imports. The River Vartry is the main river flowing through the town.

== Geography ==
Wicklow town forms a rough semicircle around Wicklow harbour. To the immediate north lies 'The Murrough', a grassy walking area beside the sea, and the eastern coastal strip. The Murrough is a place of growing commercial use, so much so that a road by-passing the town directly to the commercial part of the area commenced construction in 2008 and was completed in summer of 2010. The eastern coastal strip includes Wicklow Bay, a crescent shaped stone beach approximately 10 km in length.

Ballyguile Hill is to the southwest of the town. Much of the housing developments of the 1970s and 1980s occurred in this area, despite the considerable gradient from the town centre. From Wicklow the land rises into rolling hills to the west, going on to meet the Wicklow Mountains in the centre of the county. The dominant feature to the south is the rocky headlands of Bride's Head and Wicklow Head, the easternmost mainland point of the Republic of Ireland. On a very clear day, it is possible to see the Snowdonia mountain range in Wales.

=== Climate ===
Similar to much of the rest of northwestern Europe, Wicklow experiences a maritime climate (Cfb) with cool summers, mild winters, and a lack of temperature extremes. The average maximum January temperature is 9.2 °C (48.6 °F), while the average maximum July temperature is 20.4 °C (68.7 °F). On average, the sunniest month is May. The wettest month is October with 118.9 mm (4.6 in) of rain, and the driest month is April with 60.7 mm (2.4 in). With the exceptions of October and November, rainfall is evenly distributed throughout the year with rainfall falling within a relatively narrow band of between 60 mm (2.4 in) and 86 mm (3.4 in) for any one month. A considerable spike of moisture occurs in October and November, each of which records almost double the typical rainfall of April.

Wicklow is sheltered from moisture locally by Ballyguile Hill and, more distantly by the Wicklow Mountains. This causes the town to receive only about 60% of the rainfall the west coast receives. In addition, because Wicklow is protected by the mountains from southwesterly and westerly winds, it enjoys higher average temperatures than much of Ireland. While its location is favourable for protection against the prevailing westerly and southwesterly winds that are common to much of Ireland, Wicklow is particularly exposed to easterly winds. As these winds come from the northern European landmass Wicklow can, along with much of the east coast of Ireland, experience relatively sharp temperature drops in winter for short periods.

Climate data for Ashford, County Wicklow (1999–2020), 12 mAOD
Month	Jan	Feb	Mar	Apr	May	Jun	Jul	Aug	Sep	Oct	Nov	Dec	Year
Record high °C (°F)	17.8 (64.0)	17.4 (63.3)	19.6 (67.3)	20.4 (68.7)	24.1 (75.4)	27.0 (80.6)	29.2 (84.6)	27.1 (80.8)	25.3 (77.5)	21.6 (70.9)	18.5 (65.3)	16.4 (61.5)	29.2 (84.6)
Mean daily maximum °C (°F)	9.2 (48.6)	9.4 (48.9)	11.2 (52.2)	12.8 (55.0)	15.7 (60.3)	18.7 (65.7)	20.4 (68.7)	19.8 (67.6)	18.1 (64.6)	14.9 (58.8)	11.6 (52.9)	9.6 (49.3)	14.3 (57.7)
Daily mean °C (°F)	6.1 (43.0)	6.1 (43.0)	7.1 (44.8)	8.8 (47.8)	11.4 (52.5)	14.0 (57.2)	15.6 (60.1)	15.5 (59.9)	13.9 (57.0)	11.3 (52.3)	8.2 (46.8)	6.4 (43.5)	10.4 (50.7)
Mean daily minimum °C (°F)	2.9 (37.2)	2.8 (37.0)	3.4 (38.1)	4.7 (40.5)	6.9 (44.4)	9.5 (49.1)	11.3 (52.3)	11.2 (52.2)	10.0 (50.0)	7.4 (45.3)	4.8 (40.6)	3.1 (37.6)	6.5 (43.7)
Record low °C (°F)	−7.1 (19.2)	−5.4 (22.3)	−6.6 (20.1)	−1.8 (28.8)	−0.8 (30.6)	1.8 (35.2)	4.6 (40.3)	4.3 (39.7)	1.9 (35.4)	−1.1 (30.0)	−6.4 (20.5)	−6.8 (19.8)	−7.1 (19.2)
Average rainfall mm (inches)	86 (3.4)	61.8 (2.43)	63.6 (2.50)	60.7 (2.39)	65.8 (2.59)	72.1 (2.84)	67 (2.6)	69.8 (2.75)	72.1 (2.84)	118.9 (4.68)	110.9 (4.37)	85.6 (3.37)	935 (36.8)
Average precipitation days (≥ 1 mm)	14	10	9	10	10	10	10	10	9	13	13	11	129
Mean monthly sunshine hours	68.0	83.2	136.8	180.4	204.0	197.7	171.0	158.5	135.9	103.3	77.7	65.9	1,582.4
Source 1: Met Éireann
Source 2: Ashford Weather Station

== Economy ==
Since 1995, the town has undergone significant change and expansion reflecting the simultaneous growth in the Irish economy. Residential developments have taken place to the west of the town along Marlton Road (R751). More recently, housing developments have been concentrated to the northwest of the town towards the neighbouring village of Rathnew. The completion of the Ashford/Rathnew bypass in 2004 meant that Wicklow is now linked to Dublin (42 km north) by dual carriageway and motorway. These factors have led to a steady growth in population of Wicklow and its surrounding townlands while its importance as a commuter town to Dublin increases.

== Toponymy ==
Earlier spellings of the town's name include Wykinglo in the late 12th century, and Wykinglowe in the 14th century.

The name is usually explained as coming from the Old Norse words Víkingr ("Viking") and ló ("meadow"), that is to say "the Vikings' meadow". Norwegian toponymist Magne Oftedal criticizes this, saying that -ló was never used outside Scandinavia nor in such a combination. He argues that the first element is Uikar- or Uik- ("bay"), and that the intermediate -n- of the old forms is a mistake by clerks. However, all early recorded forms show this -n-. For this reason, Liam Price and A. Sommerfelt derive it from Víkinga-ló ("the Vikings' meadow").

Nevertheless, the Irish patronymics Ó hUiginn and Mac Uiginn (anglicised O'Higgins and Maguigan) could bring a key for the meaning "Meadow of a man called Viking".

The origin of the Irish name Cill Mhantáin bears no relation to the name Wicklow. It has an interesting folklore of its own. Saint Patrick and some followers are said to have tried to land on Travailahawk beach, which is to the south of the harbour. Hostile locals attacked them, causing one of Patrick's party to lose his front teeth. Manntach ("toothless one"), as he became known, was undeterred; he returned to the town and eventually founded a church, hence Cill Mhantáin ("church of the toothless one"). Although its anglicised spelling Kilmantan was used for a time and featured in some placenames in the town like Kilmantan Hill, it has gradually fallen out of use. The Anglo-Normans who conquered this part of Ireland preferred the non-Irish placename.

== History ==
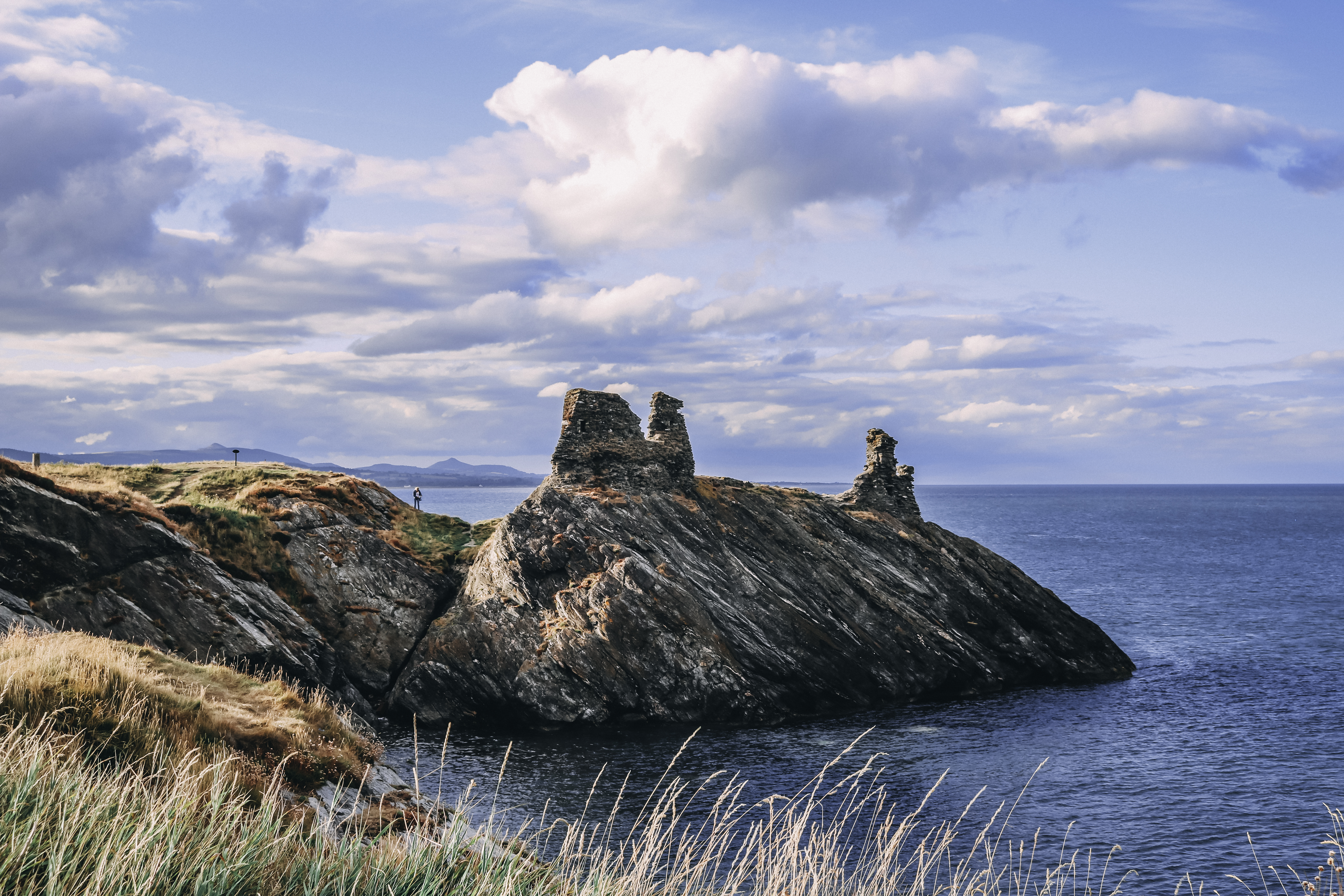
Black Castle

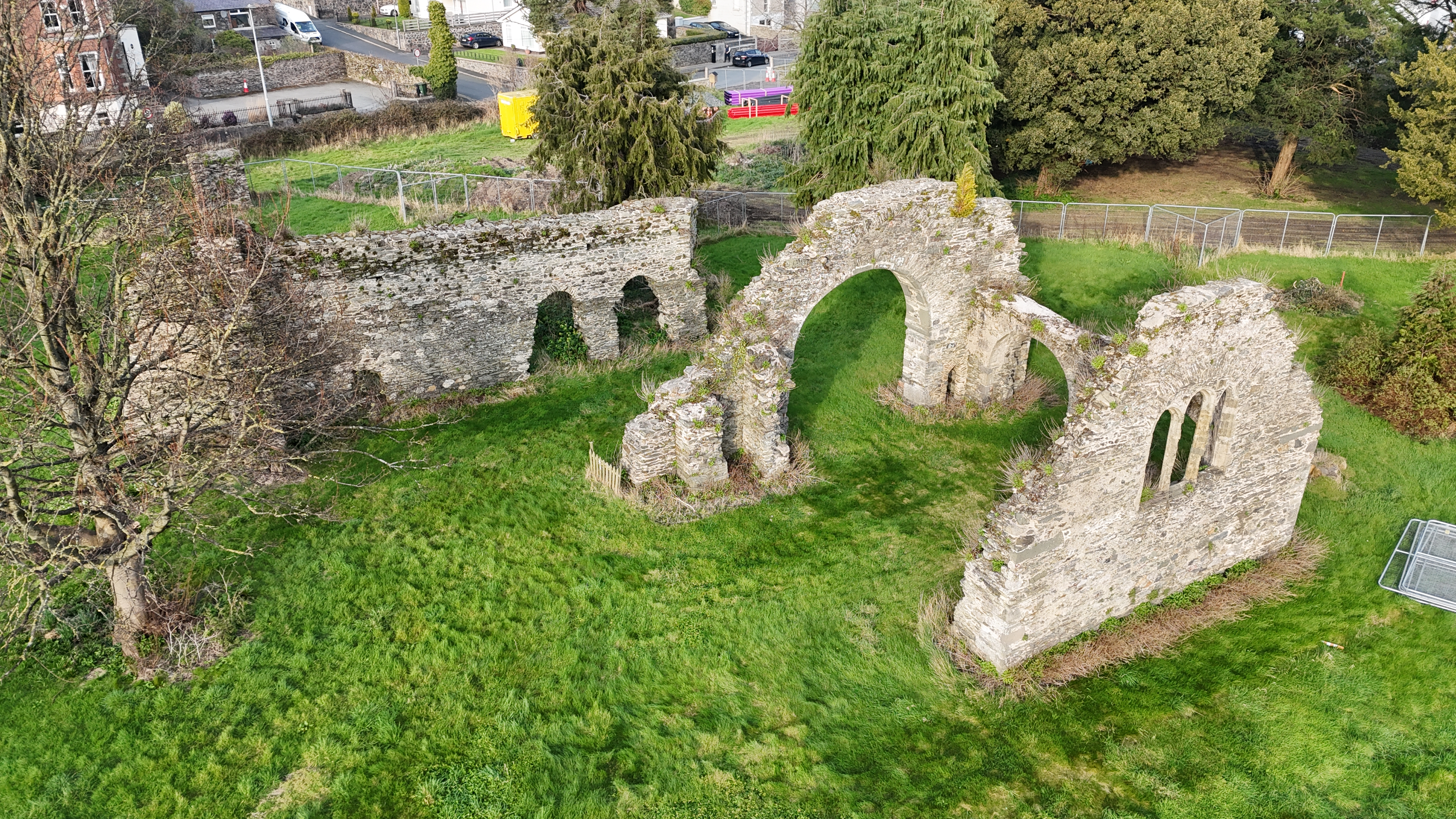
Ruins of the Franciscan friary in Wicklow

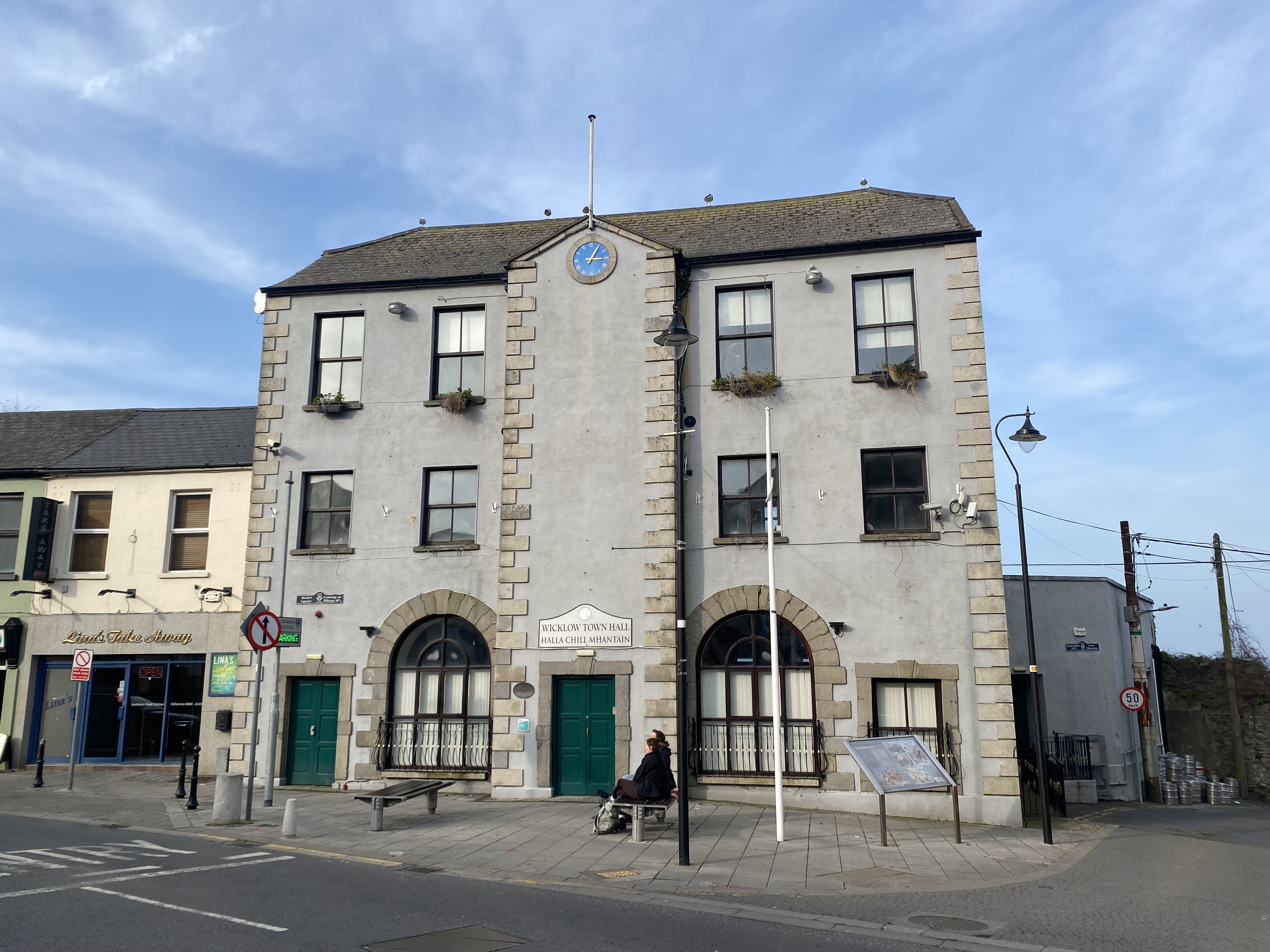
Wicklow Town Hall

Wicklow Harbour Act 1842
- Act of Parliament
- Parliament of the United Kingdom
- Long title: An Act for making and maintaining and improving a Harbour at Wicklow in the County of Wicklow.
- Citation: 5 & 6 Vict. c. cxi

Dates
- Royal assent: 30 July 1842

Text of statute as originally enacted

During excavations to build the Wicklow road bypass in 2010, a Bronze Age cooking pit (known in Irish as a fulach fiadh) and hut site was uncovered in the Ballynerrn Lower area of the town. A radio carbon-dating exercise on the site puts the timeline of the discovery at 900 BC. It has been argued that an identifiable Celtic culture had emerged in Ireland by 600 BC or even earlier. According to the Greek cartographer and historian, Ptolemy, the area around Wicklow was settled by a Celtic tribe called the Cauci/Canci. This tribe is believed to have originated in the region containing today's Belgium/German border. The area around Wicklow was referred to as Menapia in Ptolemy's map which itself dates back to 130 AD.

Vikings landed in Ireland around 795 AD and began plundering monasteries and settlements for riches and to capture slaves. In the mid-9th century, Vikings established a base which took advantage of the natural harbour at Wicklow. It is from this chapter of Wicklow's history that the name 'Wicklow' originates.

The Norman influence can still be seen today in some of the town's place and family names. After the Norman invasion, Wicklow was granted to Maurice FitzGerald who set about building the 'Black Castle', a land-facing fortification that lies ruined on the coast immediately south of the harbour. The castle was briefly held by the local O'Byrne, the O'Toole and Kavanagh clans in the uprising of 1641 but was quickly abandoned when English troops approached the town. Sir Charles Coote, who led the troops is then recorded as engaging in "savage and indiscriminate" slaughter of the townspeople in an act of revenge. Local oral history contends that one of these acts of "wanton cruelty" was the entrapment and deliberate burning to death of an unknown number of people in a building in the town. Though no written account of this particular detail of Coote's attack on Wicklow is available, a small laneway, locally referred to as "Melancholy Lane", is said to have been where this event took place.

Though the surrounding county of Wicklow is rich in Bronze Age monuments, the oldest surviving settlement in Wicklow proper is the ruined Franciscan friary (founded 1252, dissolved 1551). This is located at the west end of Main Street, within the gardens of the local Catholic parish grounds. Other notable buildings include Wicklow Town Hall, which dates back to around 1690, and Wicklow Gaol, which was built in 1702 and later renovated as a heritage centre and tourist attraction. The East Breakwater, arguably the most important building in the town, was built in the early 1880s by Wicklow Harbour Commissioners. The architect was William George Strype and the builder was John Jackson. The north Groyne was completed by about 1909; John Pansing was the designer and Louis Nott of Bristol the builder. Wicklow Gaol was a place of execution up to the end of the 19th century. Billy Byrne, a leader of the 1798 rebellion, was executed at Gallows Hill near Wicklow in 1798. He is commemorated by a statue in the town square. At Fitzwilliam Square in the centre of Wicklow town is an obelisk commemorating the career of Captain Robert Halpin, commander of the telegraph cable ship Great Eastern, who was born in Wicklow in 1836.

== Transport ==
=== Bus ===
Bus Éireann provides services to Dublin Busáras on the 133 route. The route starts at Convent Road in Wicklow, continuing to Rathnew and Dublin.

Bus Éireann also operate the 131 bus route, which provides sixteen daily services from Wicklow to Bray. This route calls at several stops in the town before terminating at Bray DART station.

Wexford Bus operates the 740A route, which provides nine services to Dublin Airport, and eight services from Dublin airport on weekdays, and three services each way on weekends. The service is via Dublin city centre. Wexford Bus's 740A service is one hour each way to Dublin city centre, some 30 minutes shorter than the Bus Éireann service. However, it does not service stops throughout the town. It only drops passengers at the Grand Hotel before continuing on to Arklow.

Wexford Bus also operates the UM11 service which calls at Wicklow's Grand Hotel bus stop and carries on to Maynooth University, via the Intel campus in Leixlip. It operates in college term time only. There is one outbound service each morning, weekdays, and a return service in the evening.

TFI Local Link operate the 183 service which runs between Arklow and Glendalough. It calls at several stops within the town. There are five services per day operating between Arklow and Wicklow, before continuing on to, and returning from Glendalough via several towns and areas in County Wicklow.

=== Rail ===
Iarnród Éireann operate six trains per day in each direction from Wicklow railway station. Services offer connections to most large towns in counties Wexford and Wicklow, as well as a coastal link to Dublin city. Services northbound terminate at Dublin Connolly and southbound terminate at Rosslare Europort.

== Sports and recreation ==
=== Golf ===
Wicklow Golf Club, founded in 1904, is located between the town and Wicklow head, while Blainroe Golf Club is situated about 3.5 km south of Wicklow. Oak Hill Cricket Club is located 7.5 km south of Wicklow. The club plays its home matches at Oak Hill Cricket Club Ground, which was constructed in 2008. The ground has hosted first-class cricket matches for Ireland and Leinster Lightning.

=== Motor racing ===
From 1950 to 1957 Wicklow was the host of the Leinster Motor Club's annual car and motorcycle races over an 8.34-mile circuit that passed through the town as well as the neighbouring village of Rathnew. Among the winners of these races were future Formula One world champion Mike Hawthorn and Grand Prix motorcycle race winner Reg Armstrong. A granite monument to the races was unveiled along their route at Whitegates on the occasion of their 50th anniversary in the year 2000.

== Wicklow Local Electoral Area ==
In local government, the Wicklow local electoral area elects six councillors to Wicklow County Council. The electoral divisions of Wicklow include Altidore, Ballycullen, Brockagh, Calary, Dunganstown East, Glendalough, Glenealy, Killiskey, Moneystown, Newcastle Upper, Oldtown, Togher, Trooperstown, Wicklow Rural and Wicklow Urban.

== News media ==
The Wicklow News was set up on 15 August 2016. Their current partial address is in Wicklow.

== Twinning ==
Wicklow is twinned with the following settlements:

- Eichenzell, Hesse, Germany
- Montigny-le-Bretonneux, Île-de-France, France
- Porthmadog, Gwynedd, Wales

== Notable people ==
- Leo Cullen, Irish rugby union coach
- Josh van der Flier, Irish rugby union player
- Nicholas Ford, Irish-born American politician
- Robert Halpin, captain of the SS Great Eastern
- F. E. Higgins, children's author
- Hybrasil, electronica group
- Jimmy Martin, golfer
- Fionnuala McCormack, runner
- Paul McShane, footballer
- Áine O'Gorman, footballer
- Ursula Stephens, Irish-born Australian politician
- George Drought Warburton, soldier and politician

== Gallery ==
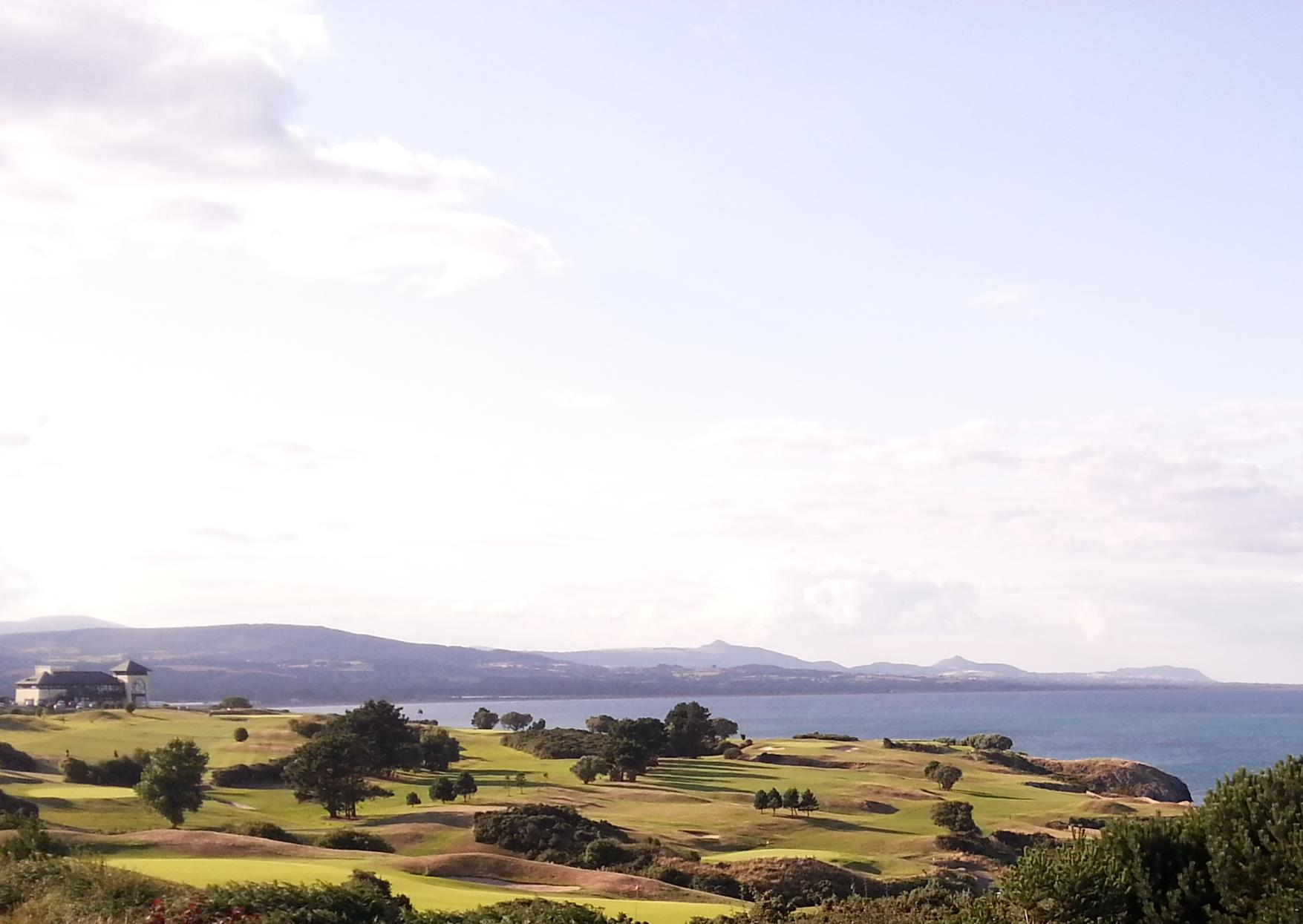
Wicklow Bay with Great Sugar Loaf (centre) and Bray Head (right)

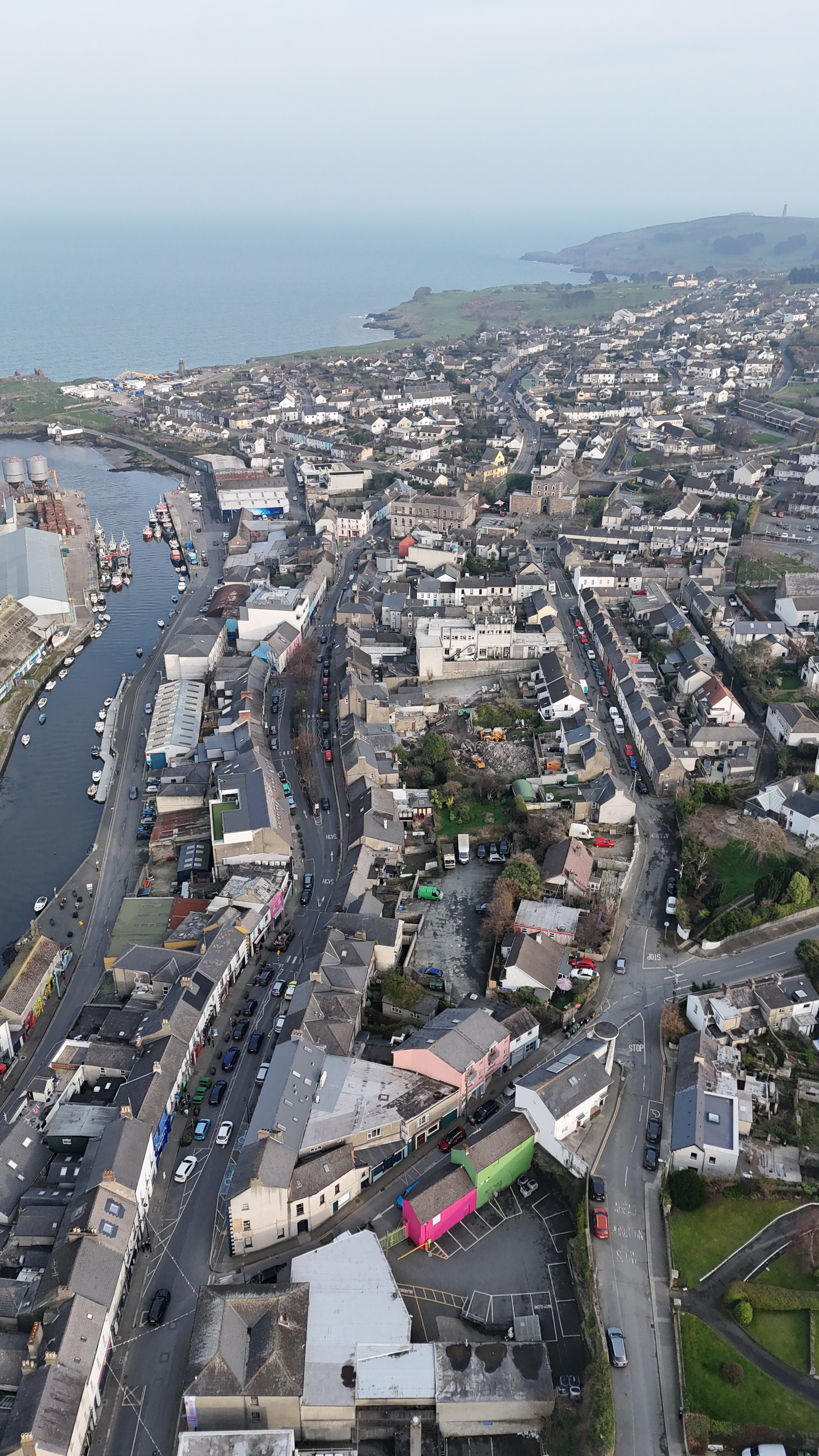
Aerial view of Wicklow

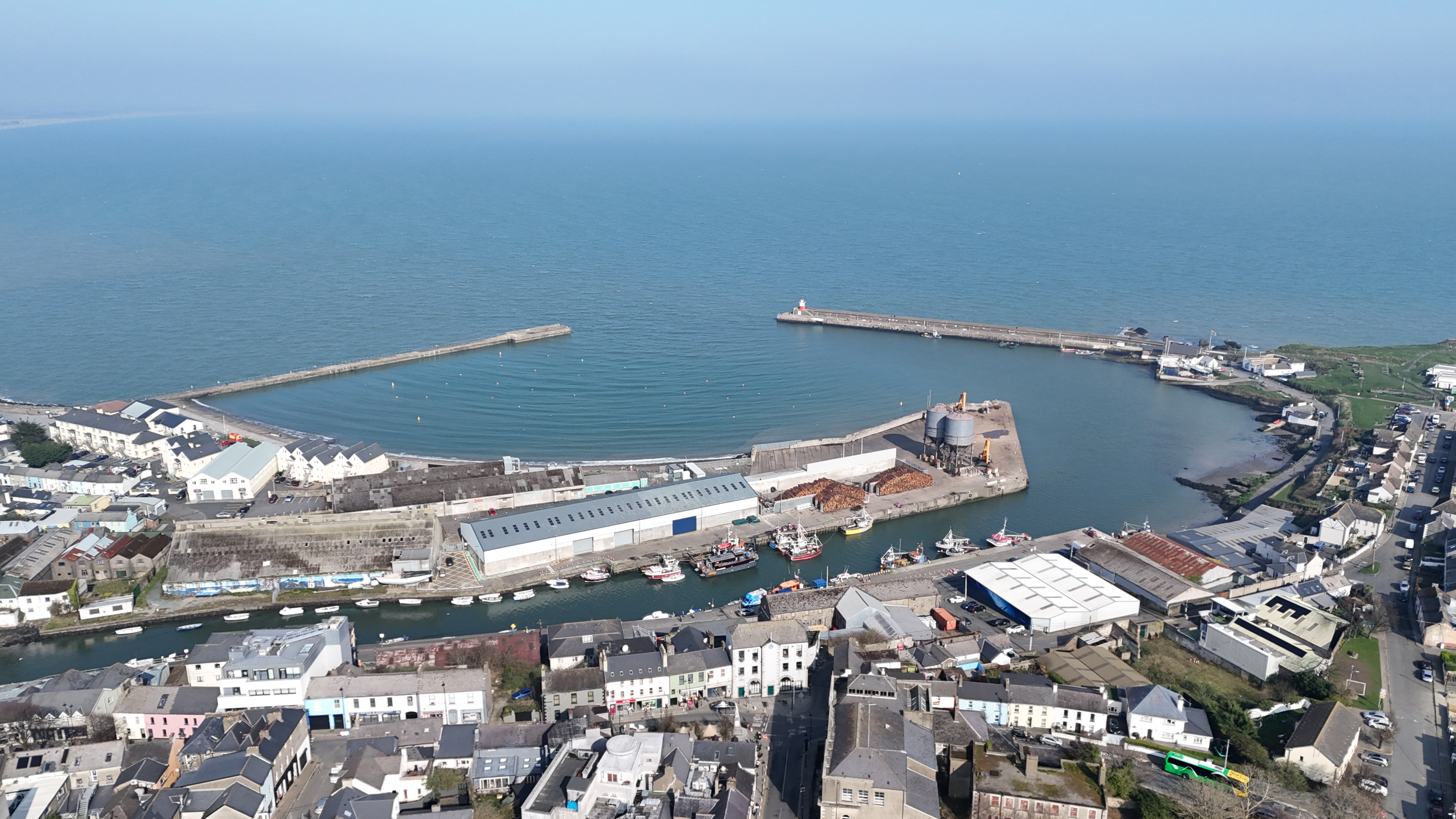
Wicklow Harbour

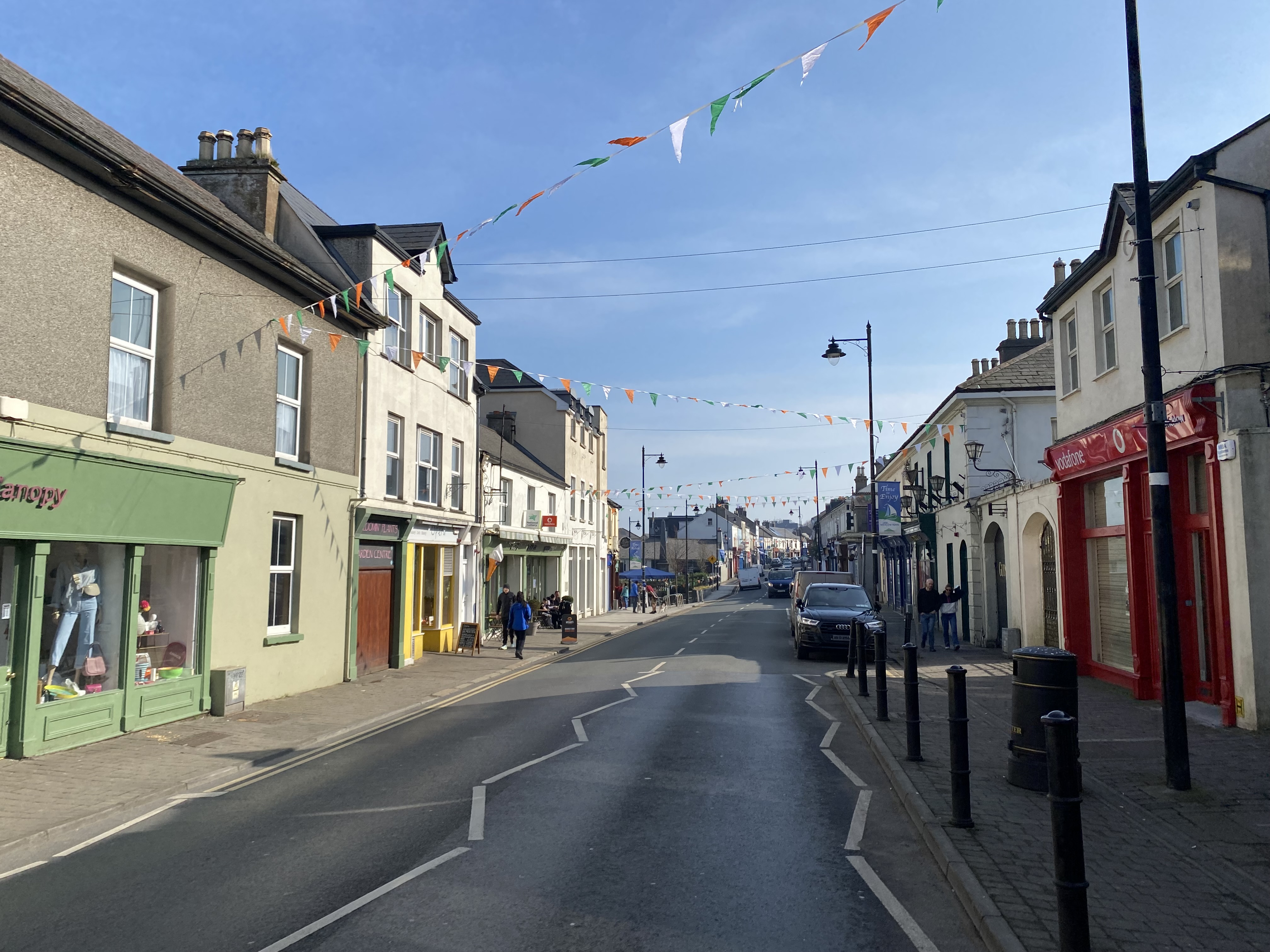
Abbey Street

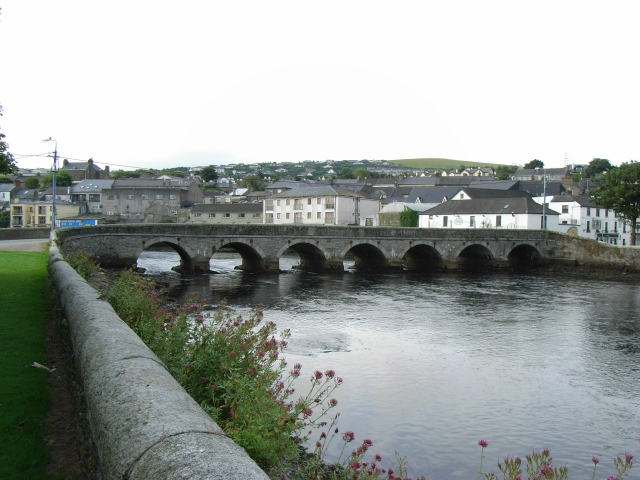
Stone Bridge over the River Vartry

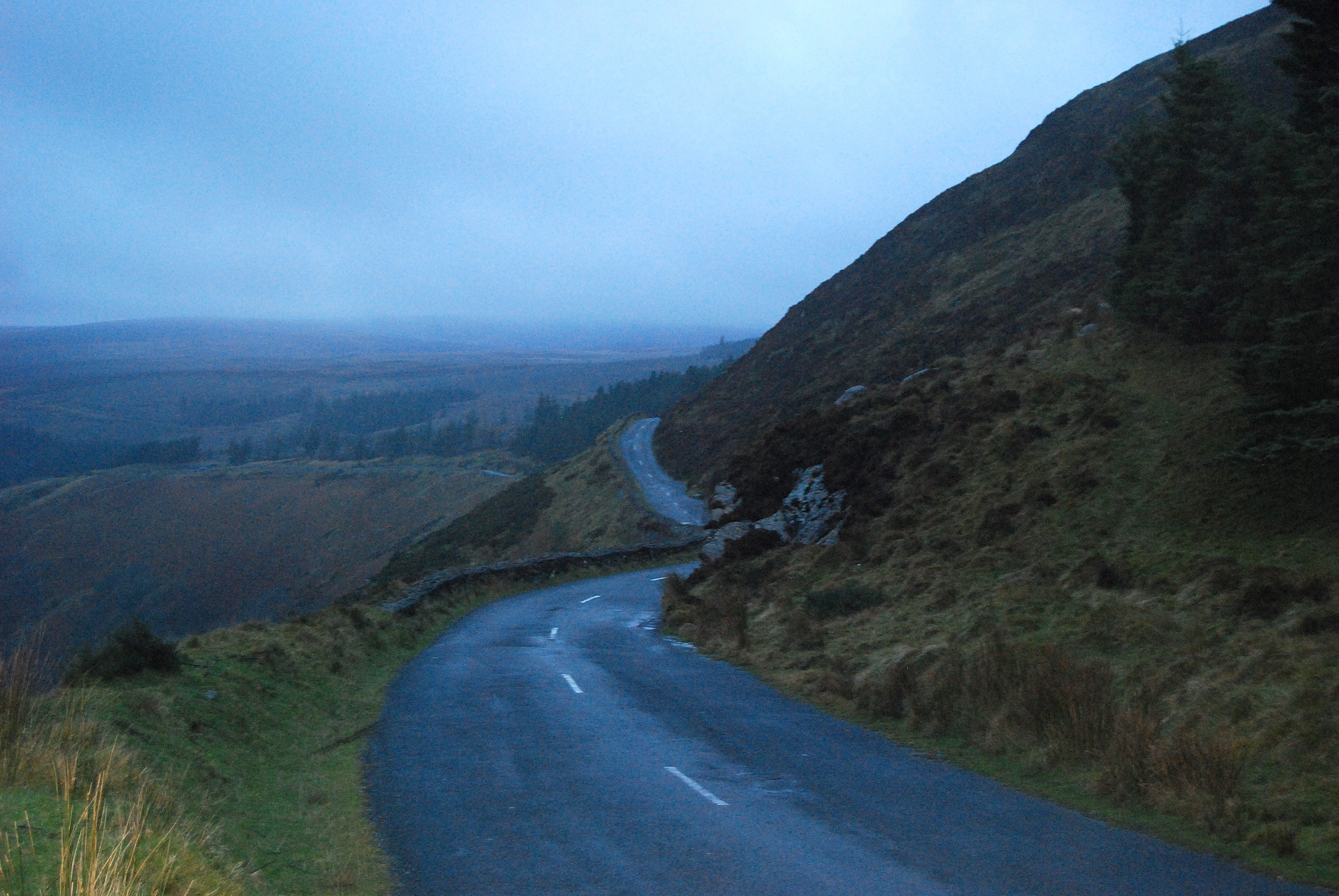
The Wicklow Mountains

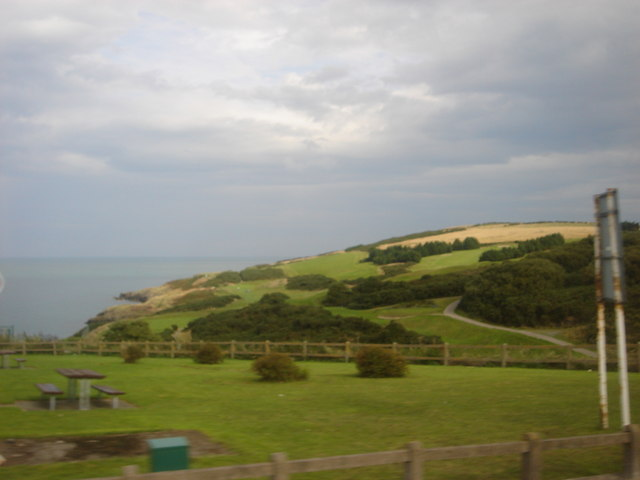
Golf course in Wicklow

== See also ==
- List of towns and villages in Ireland

== Bibliography ==
- Cleary, J and O'Brien, A (2001) Wicklow Harbour: A History, Wicklow Harbour Commissioners
