= Thomas Reynolds (informer) =

Irish informer

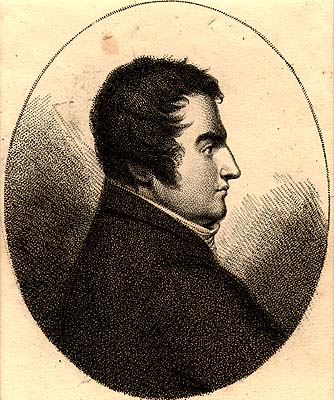
- Reynolds by Henry Brocas
- Born: 12 March 1771; Dublin, Ireland
- Died: 18 August 1836 (aged 65); Paris, France
- Occupations: United Irishman and informer

Thomas Reynolds (12 March 1771 – 18 August 1836) was an informer against the United Irishmen. He was later the British consul to Iceland.

== Early life ==
Reynolds was born on 12 March 1771 at 9 Park Street, Dublin, in which city his father, Andrew Reynolds (1742–1788), had acquired a considerable fortune as a manufacturer of poplins. His mother was Rose (died 1797), eldest child of Thomas Fitzgerald of Kilmead, County Kildare, and it was at Kilmead that Reynolds spent the first years of his life under the supervision of a Roman Catholic priest. At the age of eight he was sent to a Protestant school at Chiswick, near London, where he remained until the beginning of 1783, when he was removed to a Jesuit seminary at Liège. He returned to Ireland in the spring of 1788, and, his father dying shortly afterwards, he inherited considerable property from him. But falling into dissipated habits, in consequence of which he became seriously ill, he went for the sake of his health by sea to Rotterdam. From Rotterdam he proceeded to Paris, and in the spring of the following year he made a journey through Switzerland into Italy, returning to Paris in July. Becoming alarmed at the progress of the French Revolution, he returned to Dublin, where he speedily relapsed into dissipation. In March 1792 he came of age, and, according to his son's account, into the possession of a fortune of 20,000l., exclusive of his share in the capital and profits of his father's business. Living thus in affluence, he passed his time idly and agreeably to himself. He represented the city of Dublin in the Catholic Convention of 1792, and continued to be a member of the committee till its dissolution, after the passing of the relief act of 1793. On 25 March 1794 he married Harriet Witherington (1771–1851), whose sister Matilda was the wife of Theobald Wolfe Tone. But, in consequence of the dishonesty of a partner, his business had at that time so far declined that he found himself in serious pecuniary embarrassment. His principal creditor was a wealthy Dublin merchant of the name of William Cope, to whom his firm stood indebted for 5,000l.

== United Irishmen ==
Reynolds had previously avoided politics, but in January or February 1797 he yielded to the solicitations of his friends, and became a United Irishman. Shortly afterwards he obtained an advantageous lease of Kilkea Castle in co. Kildare from the Duke of Leinster, through the good offices of Lord Edward Fitzgerald, by whom he was in November induced to accept the post of colonel of the so-called Kildare regiment, and subsequently, in order to enable him to attend the provincial meeting, that of treasurer of the county. On 19 February 1798 there was a provincial meeting of the Leinster directorate at Oliver Bond's house in Dublin, and it was only then, according to his own account, that he became for the first time acquainted with the real designs of his fellow-conspirators, and of their intention to seize Dublin and to subvert the government by force of arms. In terror—real or feigned—at his discovery, he consulted his friend and creditor Cope, and, having disclosed enough to arouse Cope's curiosity, he was invited to play the part of informer. Cope, who was subsequently rewarded with a pension, was authorised by Cooke, the under-secretary, to stick at no sum—not even 100,000l.—in order to induce him to turn approver. Reynolds was willing to assent on less exorbitant terms. His name was to be kept a secret, and he was to be substantially indemnified for any loss he might sustain. Whether his readiness to reveal the conspiracy was due, as his son and biographer argues, to a desire to save his country from the horrors of a bloody revolution, or to less honourable motives, it is beyond a doubt that he was at the time, except for his lease of Kilkea Castle, practically a bankrupt. In consequence of information furnished by Reynolds, government was able to arrest the provincial committee at Bond's house on 12 March, and so practically to kill the conspiracy. That Reynolds had betrayed them was certainly the opinion of some of the United Irishmen, and it is said that only his coolness and intrepid bearing on being challenged with his deceitfulness by Samuel Neilson saved him from being shot dead on the spot. Others were not so credulous as Neilson, and more than one attempt seems to have been made to assassinate him; and, in order to disarm suspicion, he took an oath before a county member that he had not betrayed the meeting at Bond's.

For a time his secret was so well kept that his property at Kilkea suffered severely from the military, who were freely quartered there, in consequence of his supposed ‘croppy’ politics. On 5 May he was actually arrested on a charge of harbouring Lord Edward Fitzgerald, and it was not till he had been taken to Dublin, and his identity revealed to Under-secretary Cooke, that he was set at liberty. It was impossible to return to his house, and so, having promised to give evidence at the forthcoming trials, he was accorded shelter in Dublin Castle till the storm had blown over. The terms of the bargain were arranged by his wife, and, in addition to a pension of 1,000l. a year, to commence on 25 June 1798, with 5,000l. in hand, it was agreed that he might settle in any part of England he liked, and receive from government letters of introduction, recommending him and his family to the particular attention of the gentry of the place. He was the principal crown witness at the trial of John McCann on 17 July, but it was said that under the fierce cross-examination of John Philpot Curran, it was Reynolds rather than McCann who was on trial. Reynolds was, again, the principal witness at the trial of William Michael Byrne on 21 July, and of Oliver Bond on the 23rd, and was on the last occasion scornfully denounced by Curran.

== Later life ==
After the suppression of the rebellion and the restoration of the metropolis to some degree of tranquillity, Reynolds emerged from his quarters in the castle and took a house in Leinster Street. By the influence of government he was on 15 October made free of the guild of merchants of Dublin, and on 19 October received the freedom of the city. But the feeling of the populace was extremely hostile to him, and one night, when Major Sirr was dining with him, his house was attacked by the mob. The assailants were driven off; but Reynolds, not feeling secure, removed shortly afterwards to England, going in the first place to Allonby in Cumberland, and subsequently to London. After a short time he was compelled, by his habitual extravagance, to retire to Usk in Monmouthshire; but, returning to London, he eventually, in 1810, succeeded in getting himself appointed postmaster or packet agent at Lisbon. The emoluments of the office during the four years he held it amounted to 5,600l., but on the withdrawal of the British army from the Peninsula they sank so low that he resigned it, and in September 1814 returned with his wife to London. Early in 1817 he was offered the post of British consul in Iceland, and after some hesitation, and stipulating that he should not be obliged to reside there, he accepted it. The appointment occurred about the time of the trial of Wilson and others for high treason in connection with the Spa-fields meeting. True bills were found against the prisoners by the grand jury of Middlesex; but, Reynolds's name appearing on the panel, public feeling was greatly aroused against government. ‘He should retire,’ said Curran, ‘from public view, hid beneath the heap of his own carnage.’ Lord Castlereagh, who suffered acutely from the untoward incident, evidently took this view of the situation, and in July Reynolds was quietly shipped off to Copenhagen to take up the duties of his consulship. The salary attached to the post was barely 300l., and after a brief trial, including a visit in the summer of 1818 to Iceland, he determined to resign it. Returning for that purpose to London, he was allowed to transfer the consulship to his son, and to travel for his health on the continent. After Lord Castlereagh's death in 1822 he was informed by Canning that government desired to have as little to do with him and his family as possible, and that the consulship would be abolished but an adequate allowance allotted him. He retired permanently to Paris, where he loved to parade his pompous person in the Champs-Elysées. He is said to have undergone a religious conversion in 1831. In the following year he was attacked by cholera, to the effects of which he eventually succumbed on 18 August 1836. He was interred in the family vault in Welton church, Yorkshire. In 1839 his younger son, Thomas (died 1848), undertook the task of vindicating his father's character; but the investigations of Richard Robert Madden, and more recently of William John Fitzpatrick, do not tell in Reynolds's favour. A more judicial and less hostile view is taken by William Edward Hartpole Lecky.
