= Wicklow Friary =

Ruined Franciscan abbey in Wicklow, Ireland

- Prióireacht Chill Mhantáin
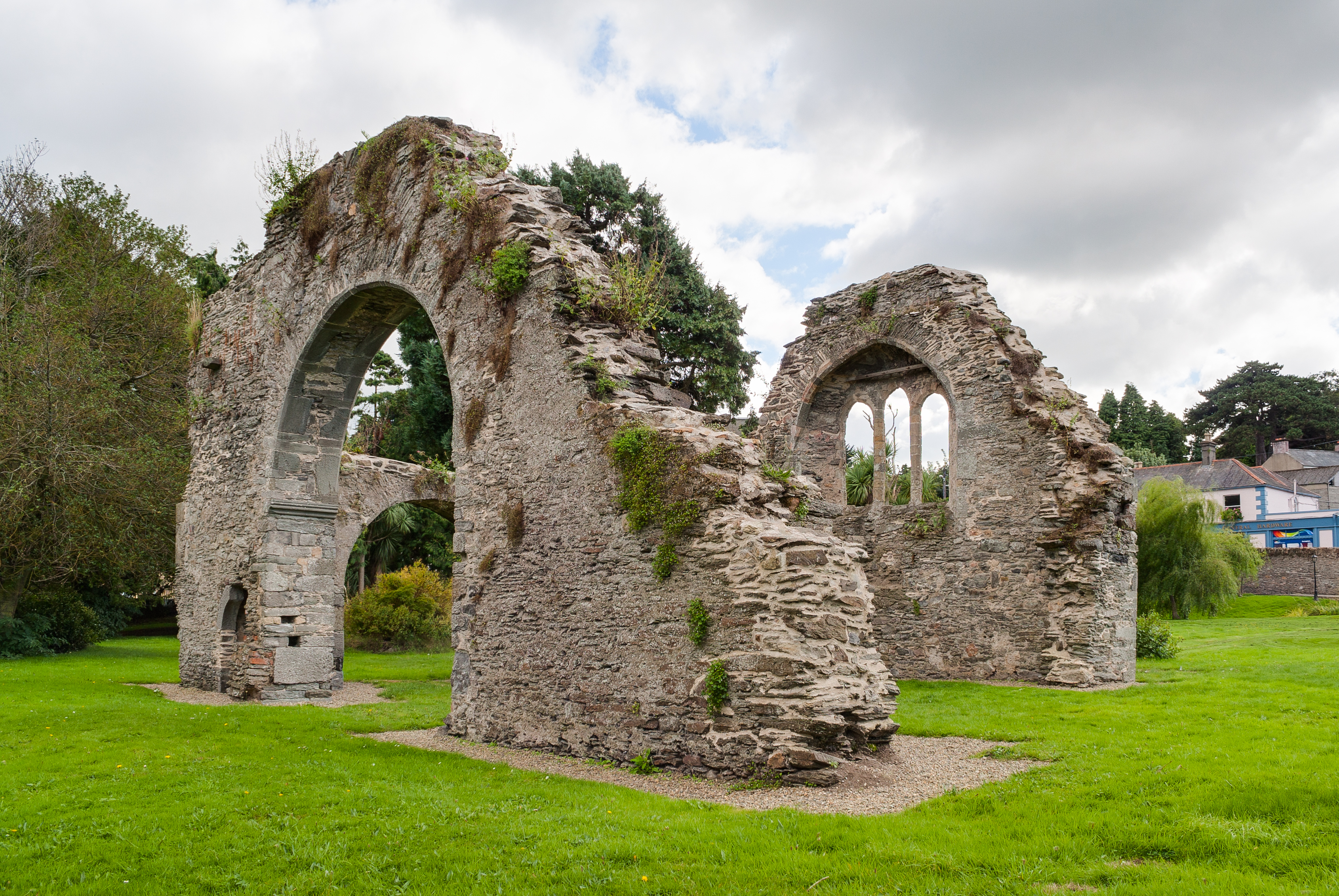
- South transept of the friary, looking south-east.

- Location within Ireland

Monastery information
- Other names: Monisharlee; Cell-mantain; Cell-mentain; Bachilow; Bichilo; Wykynlow
- Order: Order of Friars Minor Conventual; Observant Franciscan Friars
- Established: 1252
- Disestablished: c. 1551
- Diocese: Dublin

Architecture
- Functional status: Ruined
- Style: Gothic

Site
- Location: Abbey Street, Wicklow, County Wicklow, Ireland
- Coordinates: 52°58′53″N 6°02′47″W
- Visible remains: south transept (without west wall), part of north wall of the nave
- Public access: No

Wicklow Friary, also called Wicklow Abbey, is a ruined Franciscan friary located in Wicklow, Ireland, active in the 13th to 16th centuries.

== History ==
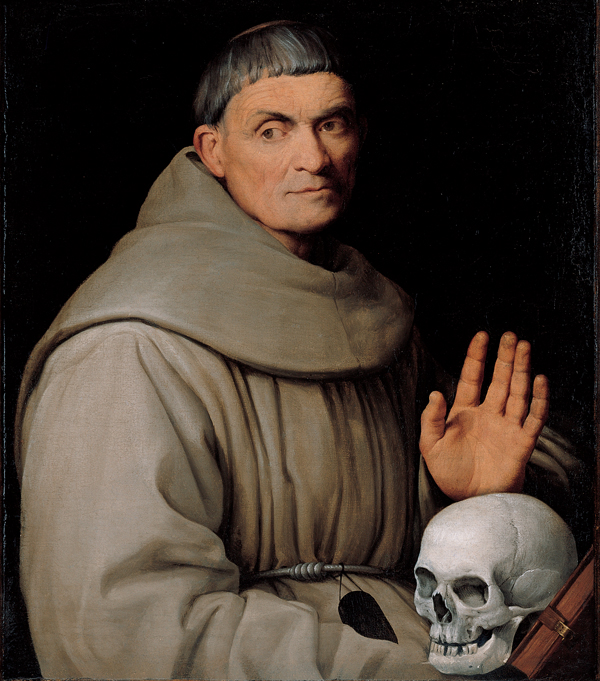
"Portrait of a Franciscan Friar" with characteristic grey habit and tonsure (Jacopo Bassano, Italy, c. 1541)

Wicklow Friary was founded in 1252, during the reign of Henry III of England as Lord of Ireland, for the Order of Friars Minor Conventual (Grey Friars). Dundry stone was used in the three-light window. It had only 9 acres (3.6 ha) of land and a meadow as an endowment; the monastery was partly funded by the sale of burial rights and bequests; in 1356 it is recorded that the friary received ten cows and a vat of beer (worth 102 shillings) from a donor.

About 1436 the monastery adopted the strict observance of the Observant Franciscans. It was dissolved during the reign of Edward VI (r. 1547–53), with the last guardian Dermot O'Moore being expelled. The land was leased to Henry Harrington in 1575. It was used as an armoury and a courthouse, before falling into ruin by the 17th century. Today it forms part of the gardens of the town's parochial house.

The abbey grounds were excavated in 2022–23; remains of several monks were found.

== Buildings ==
The church was originally 115–135 ft (35–41 m) in length.

All that remains today of the abbey church is the south transept (without its west wall), and a section of the north wall of the nave.

== Gallery ==
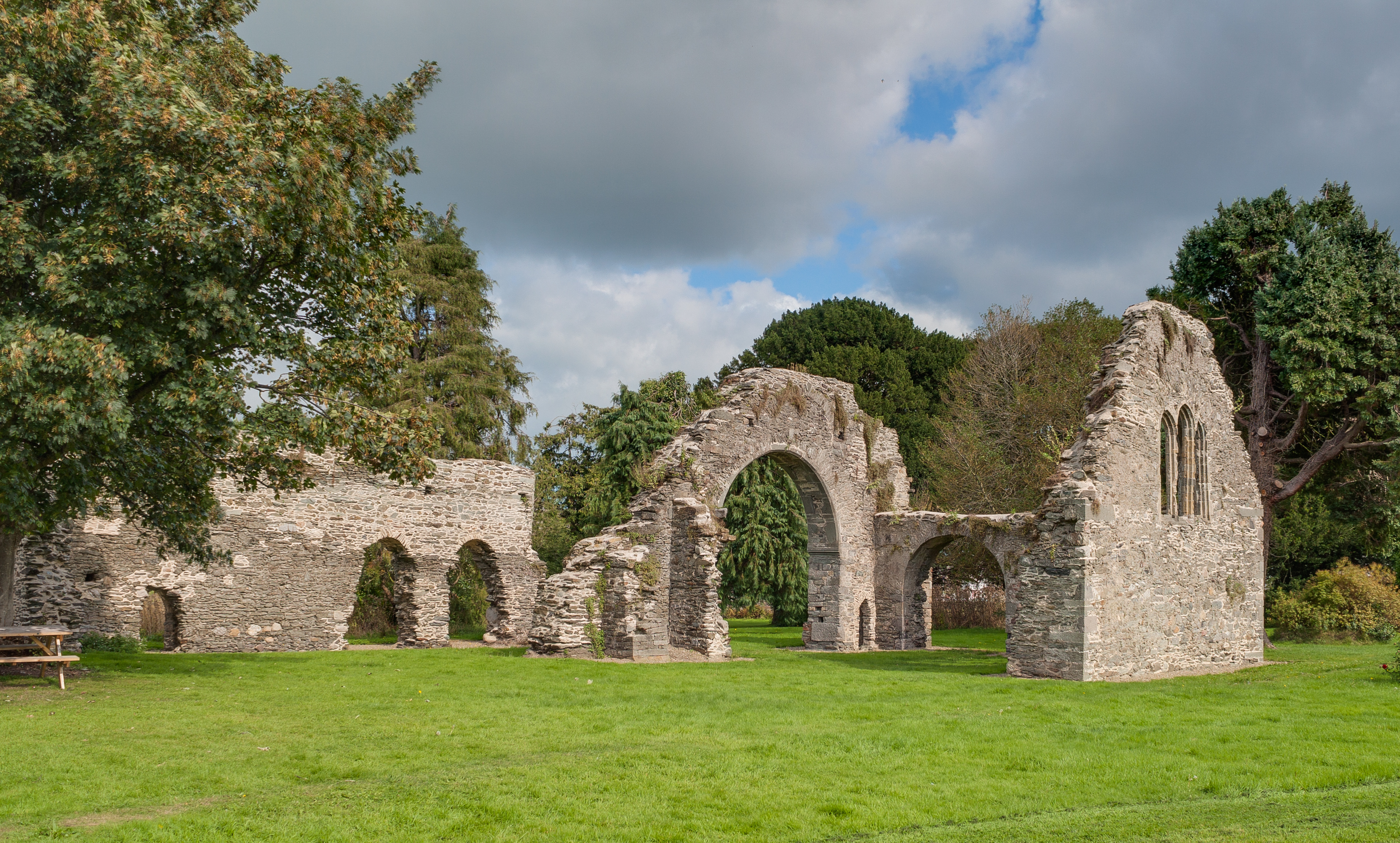
Friary buildings seen from the southwest.

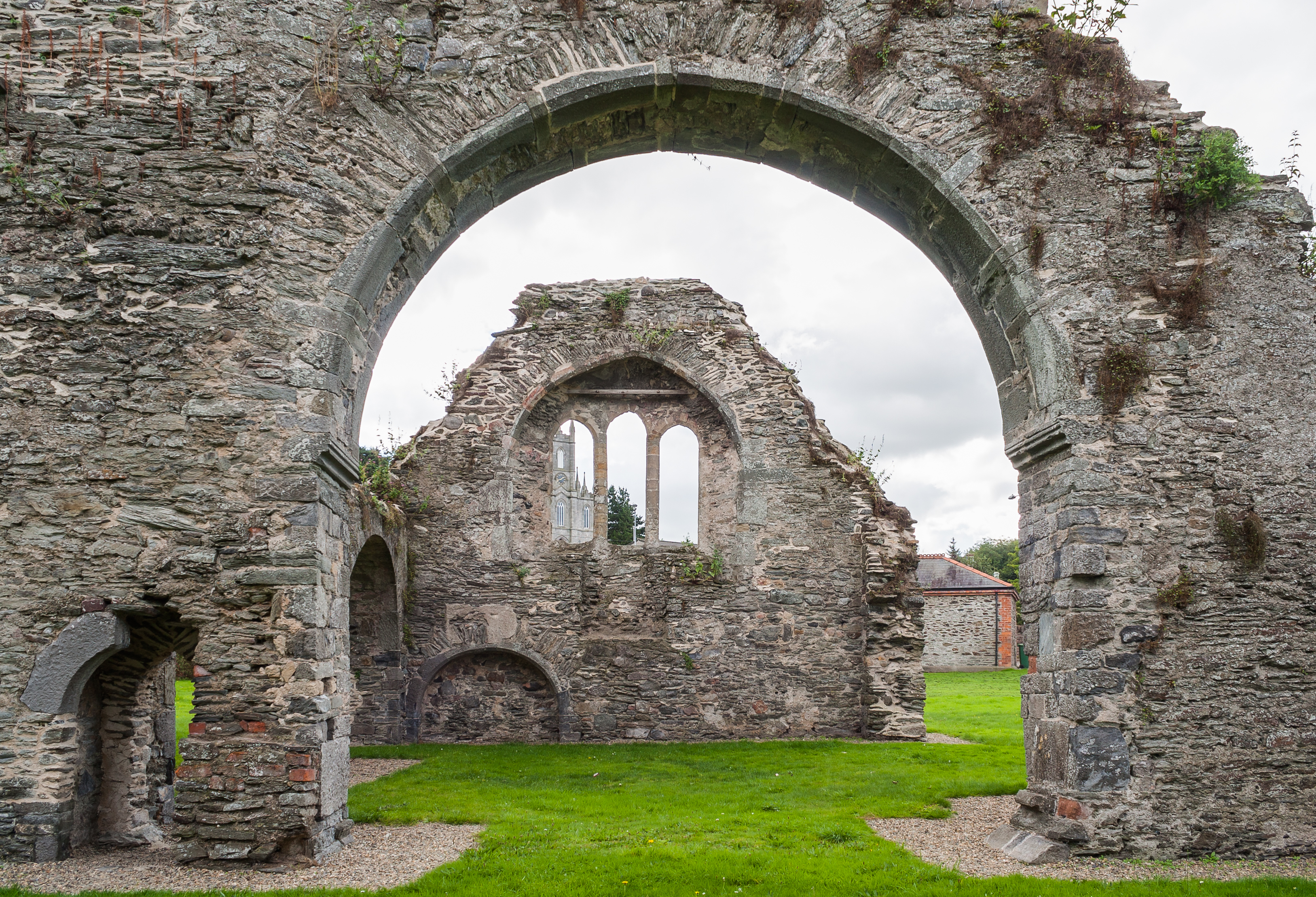
South transept of the friary as seen from the nave, looking south.

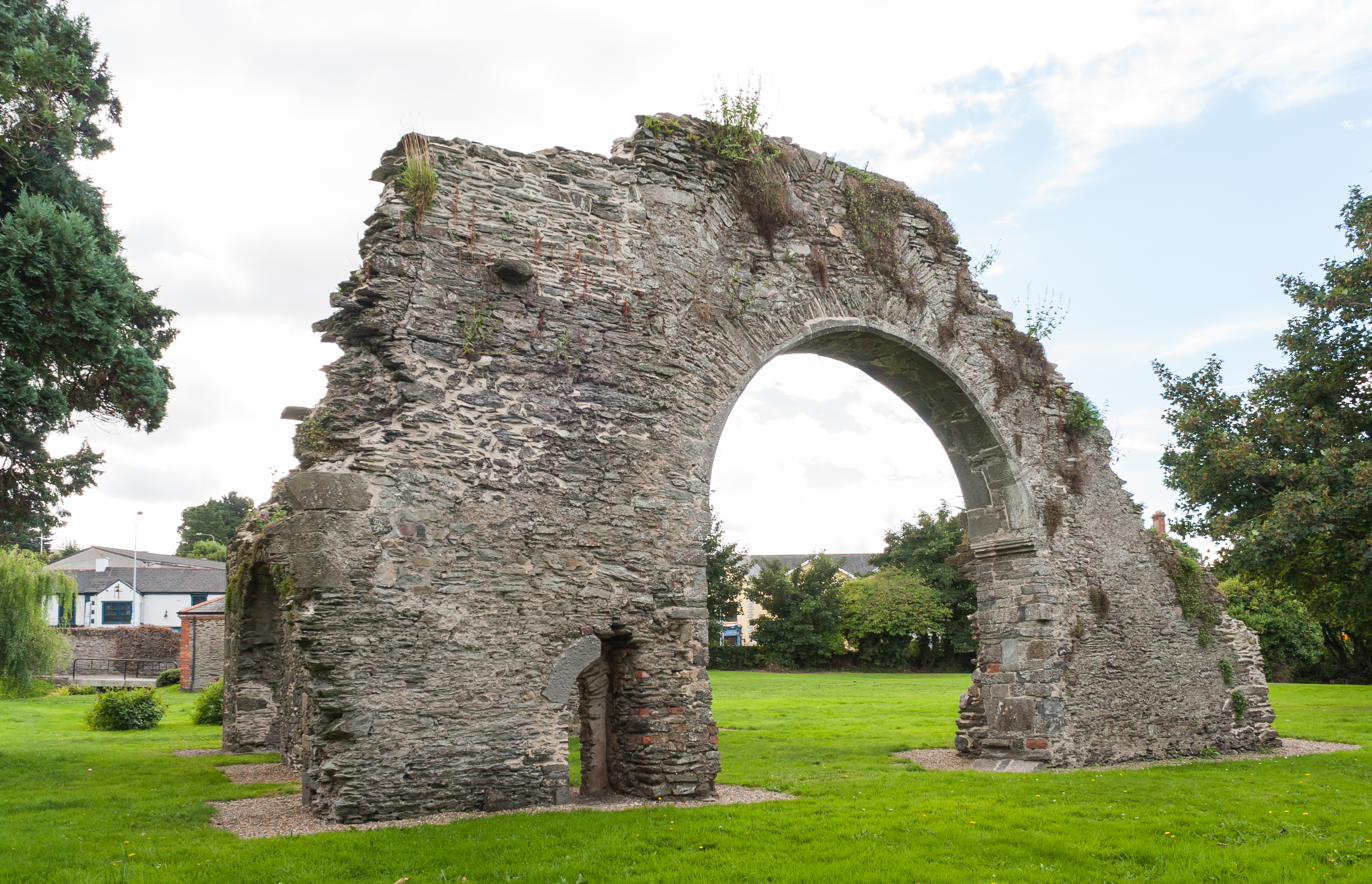
Arch of the south transept as seen from north, looking southwest.

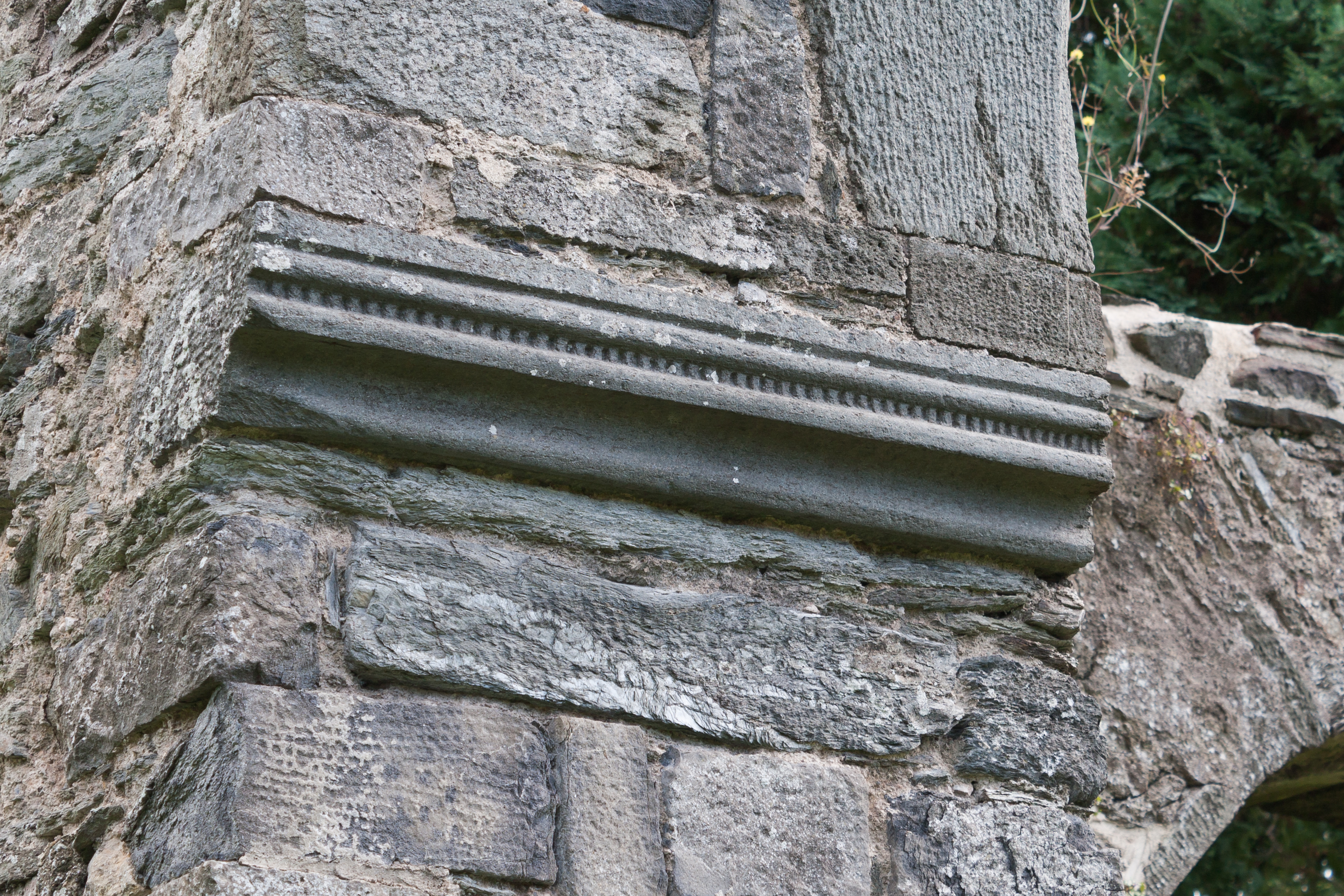
Capital

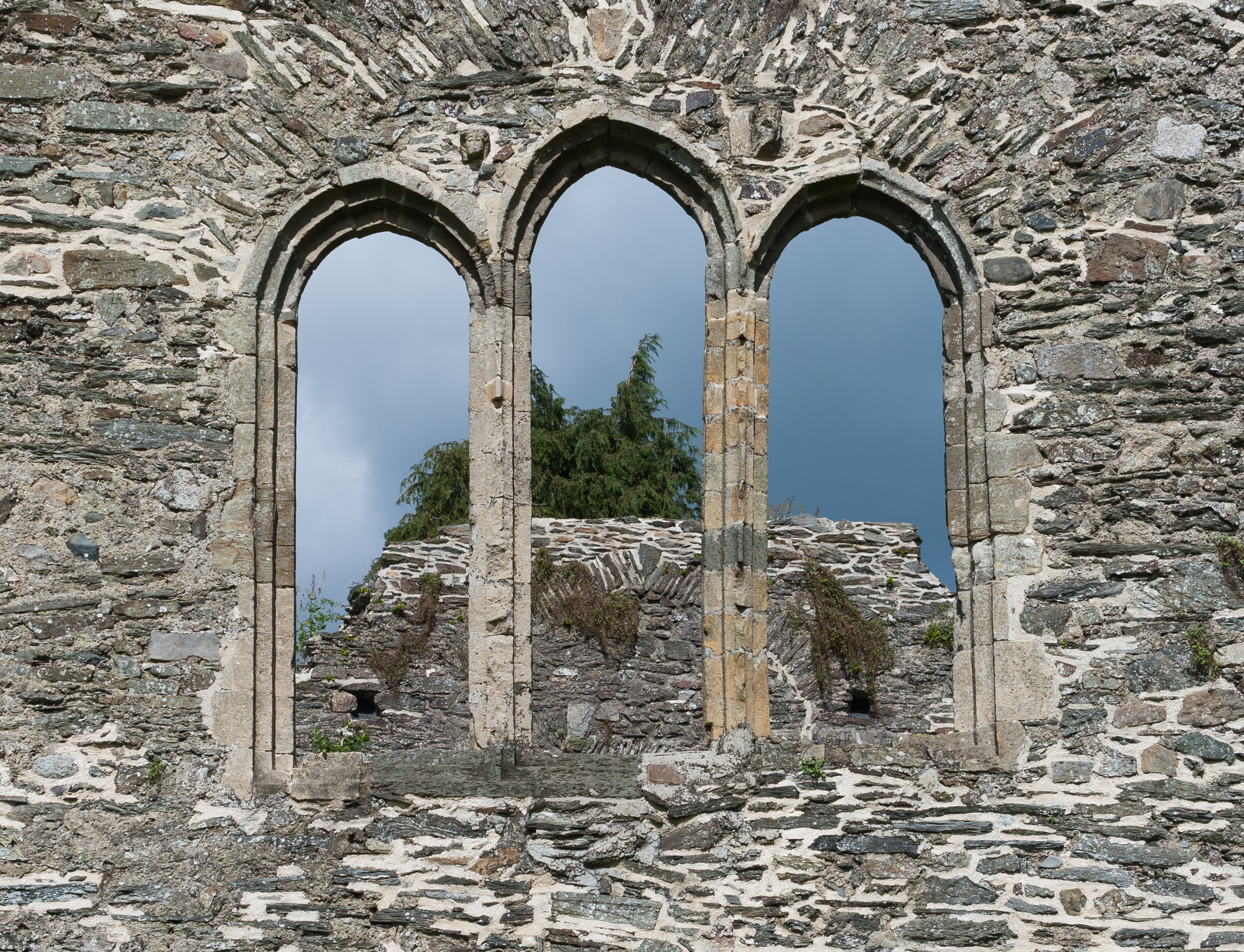
Three-light window in the south wall of the south transept.

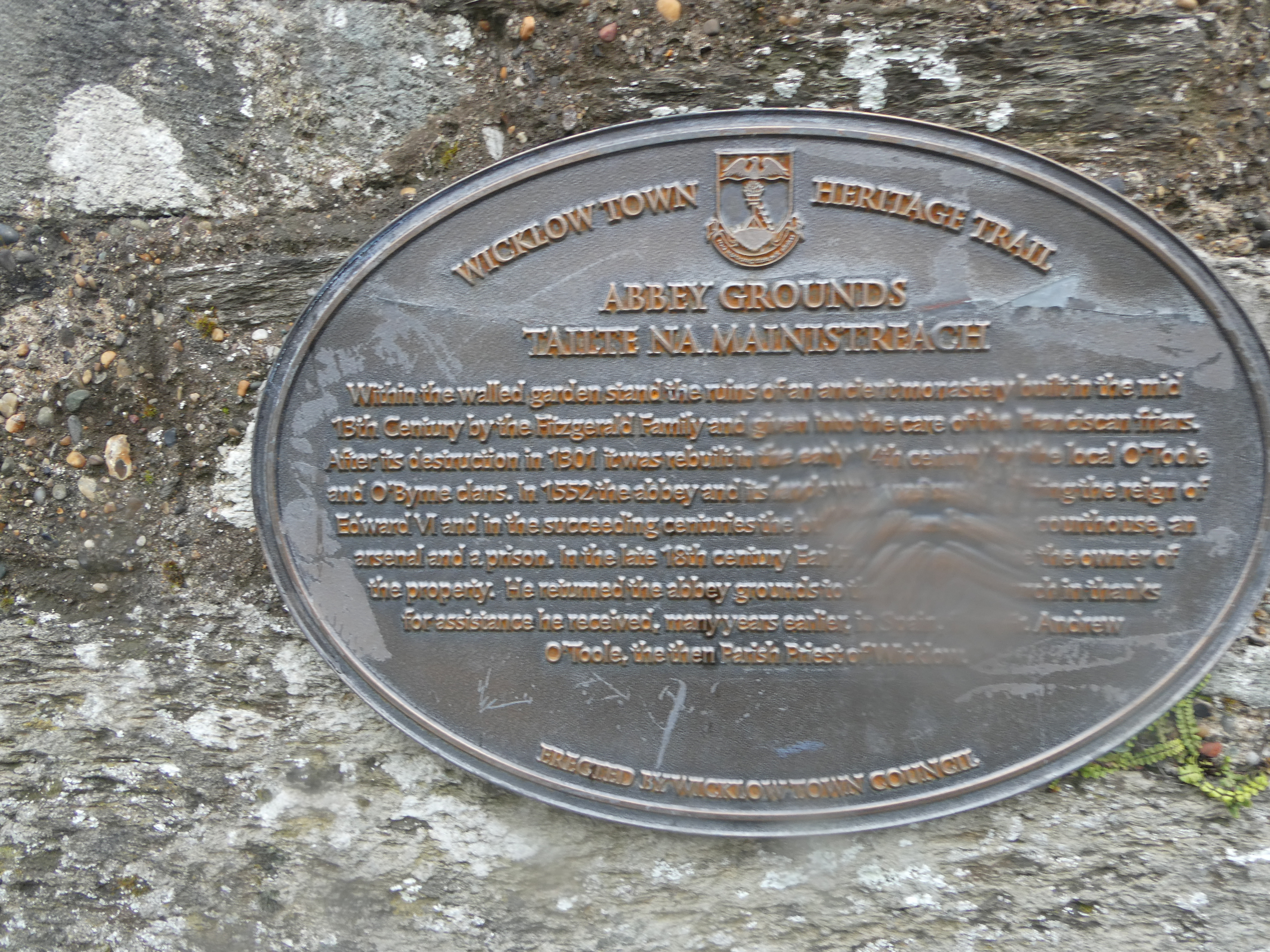
Information sign

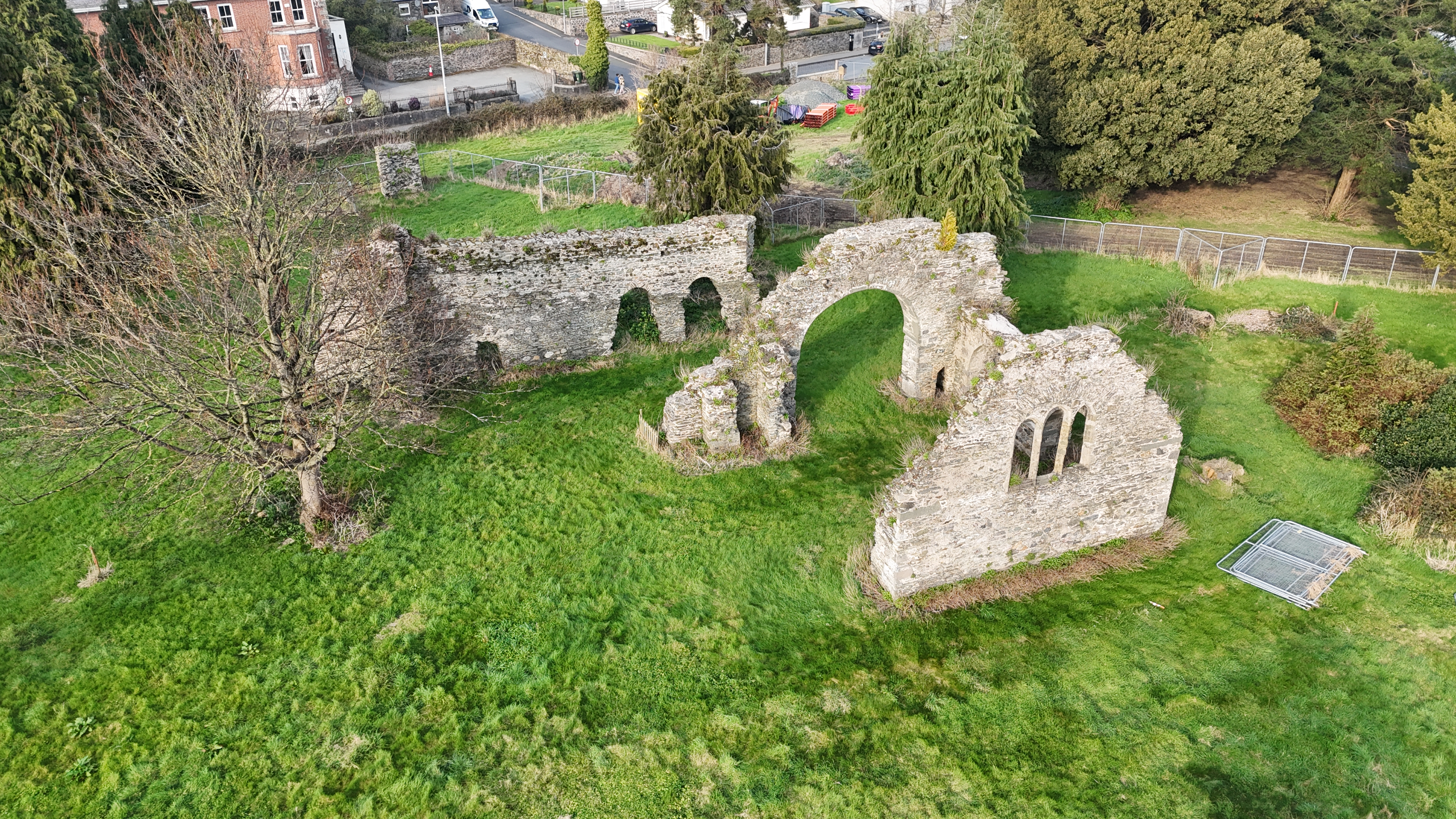
Aerial view
