= William Michael Byrne =

Irish political activist (1775–1798)

William "Billy" Michael Byrne (1775–1798) from Glen of the Downs, County Wicklow, Ireland was a key figure in the United Irishmen in the years leading to the 1798 Rebellion against the British government.

== Early life ==
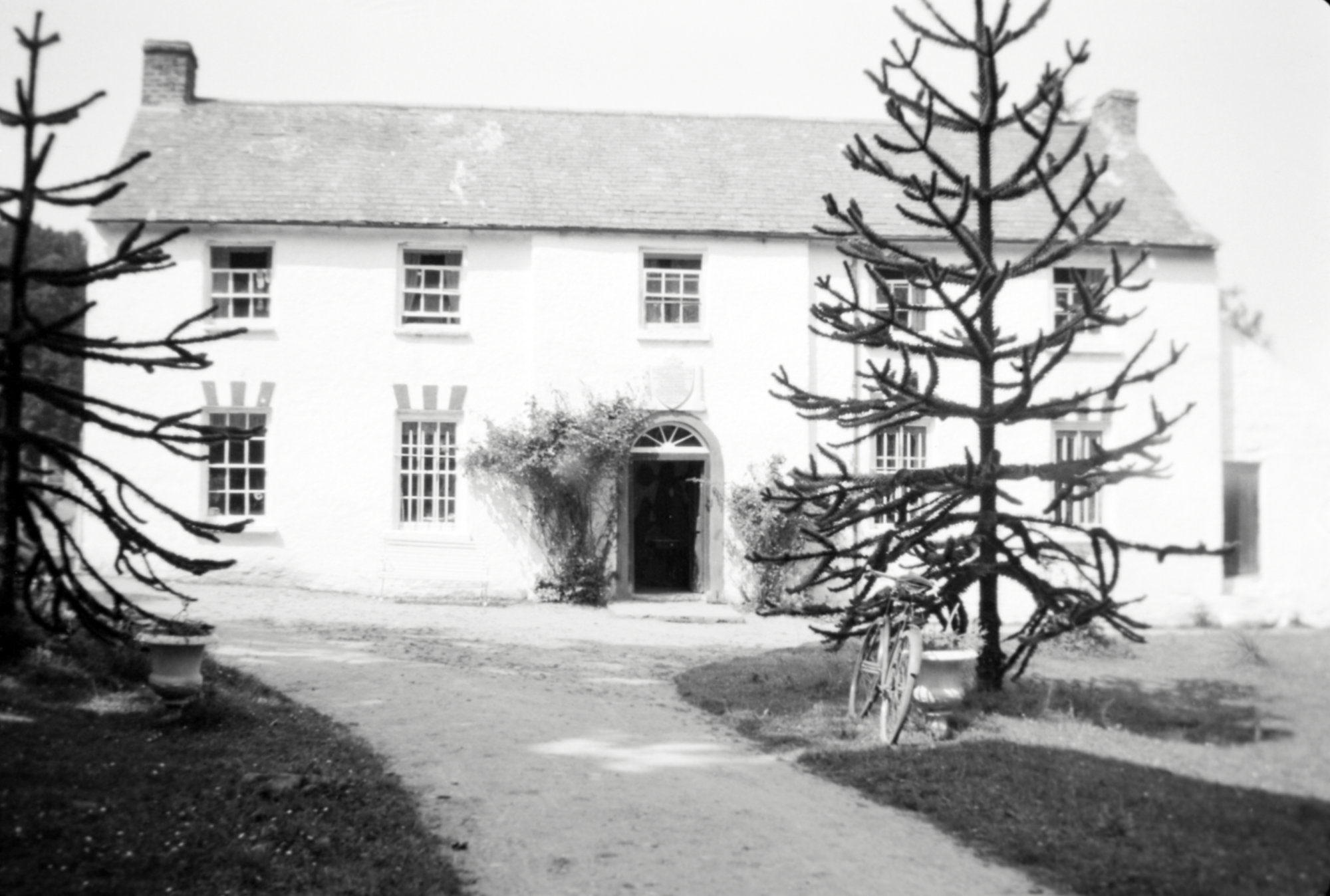
Billy Byrne's residence at Ballymanus House

Byrne was one of the two sons of Colclough Byrne of Drumquin, Hackettstown and Mary Galway of Cork, a great grand-niece of James Butler, 1st Duke of Ormond. William though was to live most of his adult life at Park Hill in the Glen of the Downs. In late 1796, he enlisted in the yeomanry - serving in the Newtown Mount Kennedy cavalry.

== Revolutionary ==
Byrne joined the Society of the United Irishmen in spring 1797 and later that same year was appointed by the Leinster committee to organise the half barony of Rathdown. As a delegate for Rathdown barony, Byrne was a well-respected and competent figure. And with the assistance of his protestant friend Thomas Miller of Powerscourt, he undertook the organisation of military and civil branches of the United Irishmen in Rathdown - recruiting 2,000 men by late 1797. In October of that year, Byrne was forced to resign from the yeomen after refusing to swear the oath of loyalty and his activities began to come to the attention of Dublin Castle. According to the informant A.B. (Thomas Murray), William had attended the inaugural meeting of the United Irishmen's Wicklow county committee in December. It was held in the Annacurra home of William's first cousin, John Loftus.

At this meeting, Byrne and was as Head Delegate for the Wicklow Committee. Thomas Murray's information tells that Byrne established networks of contacts between the Leinster committee and the Cork United Irishmen along with other contacts in Munster. Sometime in 1797, Byrne married Rosanna Hoey by whom he fathered a daughter, Mary.

== Arrest and imprisonment ==
Byrne's career came to an end when he with fourteen other Leinster delegates were arrested on 12 March 1798 at the house of Oliver Bond. They had been betrayed by Thomas Reynolds, treasurer of Kildare United Irishmen and member of the provincial committee. Reynolds had been informed that plans for an insurrection were about to be finalised by the committee. Byrne was arrested in possession of incriminating documents which were described by Attorney-General Arthur Wolfe as being: ' ... very treasonable printed papers'.

On 4 July, Byrne with four others was brought before a commission of oyer and terminer on charges of high treason. The case mounted by the state against him was based principally on the evidence of Reynolds and also that given by his former comrade William Miller of Powerscourt. The weight of the evidence was overwhelming, rendering an effective defence impossible.

Byrne's lawyer, John Philpot Curran KC, the leading defence counsel of the age, attempted to cast Reynold's character and motives in a foul light but it was futile.

== Execution ==
Byrne was convicted of high treason and executed on 25 July 1798 at Gallows Hill near Wicklow.

In his last days, efforts were made to spare Byrne's life if he would only express regret for his actions and accuse Lord Edward Fitzgerald for having led him to this point. He refused, meeting his end with great dignity and stoicism. The Dublin Magazine noted that William: ' ... met his fate with a degree of courage perhaps unequalled'. For his service to the state, Reynolds was honoured by Dublin Corporation with the freedom of the city on October 19, 1798, spending much of his life thereafter in fear of assassination.
