= Oliver Bond =

Irish merchant

- Born: circa 1760; St. Johnston, County Donegal, Ulster, Kingdom of Ireland
- Died: 6 September 1798; Dublin, Ireland
- Resting place: St. Michan's Church, Dublin
- Occupation: Merchant
- Organization: United Irishmen
- Movement: Irish Rebellion of 1798
- Criminal charge: High treason
- Criminal penalty: Death (commuted)
- Spouse: Eleanor Jackson (m. 1791)

Oliver Bond (circa 1760–1798) was an Irish merchant and a member of the Leinster directorate of the Society of United Irishmen. He died in prison following the Irish Rebellion of 1798.

== Life ==
Born around 1760 into an Ulster-Scots family in St. Johnston, a village in the Laggan district in the east of County Donegal in Ulster, in the north of the Kingdom of Ireland, he was the son of a dissenting minister, and was connected with several respectable families. In his early years, he worked as an apprentice haberdasher in nearby Derry, before relocating to Dublin.

In the capital, he was in business as a merchant in the woollen trade, and became wealthy. Initially, he was based in Pill Lane (now Chancery Street), before moving to 9 Lower Bridge Street in 1786. In 1791, he married Eleanor 'Lucy' Jackson, daughter of the iron founder Henry Jackson, who like Bond was to become a leading United Irishman.

Bond was an early member in the movement planning for a union in Ireland across religious lines to press for reform of the Irish Parliament and for an accountable government independent of the British Privy Council and cabinet. When, following the Belfast example, the Society of United Irishmen formed in Dublin in November 1791, Bond became a member.

Bond was secretary of the meeting, with the barrister Simon Butler presiding, when in February 1793 the society passed resolutions which, in addition to the call for Catholic Emancipation and parliamentary reform, condemned as unconstitutional the repressive measures of the government, and deplored war against the new French Republic. A result was a summons to appear before the bar of the House of Lords in Dublin where, in consequence of their defiant performance, Bond and Butler were charged and convicted of libel, fined and confined for six months in Newgate Prison.

Despairing of their efforts to secure full emancipation and advance parliamentary reform, and in anticipation of French assistance, the United Irishmen resolved on an insurrection to depose the Crown's Dublin Castle executive and the Protestant Ascendancy Lords and Commons, and to establish Ireland as an independent republic. Bond became a member of the United Irishmen's northern executive committee and of the Leinster directorate, the meetings of which were generally held at his house on Lower Bridge Street.

There, on 19 February 1798, the famous resolution was passed: "We will pay no attention to any measure which the Parliament of this kingdom may adopt, to divert the public mind from the grand object we have in view; as nothing short of the entire and complete regeneration of our country can satisfy us."

Through the treachery of Thomas Reynolds, Bond's house was surrounded by the military on the morning of 12 March 1798, and fourteen members of the Leinster Directory were seized. The insurrection went forward in their absence to defeat in the early summer. Following the suppression of the rebellion, Bond went to trial. The efforts of his defence counsel, John Philpot Curran, to discredit Reynold's testimony were unavailing. On 27 July 1798, Bond was convicted of treason and sentenced to hang.

It was mainly to prevent his execution that Thomas Addis Emmet and other state prisoners entered a compact with the government whereby (without incriminating further individuals) they agreed to testify on the activities of Union Irishmen before a parliamentary committee, and to accept permanent exile. With the endorsement of Lord Cornwallis, the Commander-in-Chief, Ireland, Bond's sentence was commuted. He survived, however, but five weeks, dying in prison of apoplexy on 6 September 1798, aged 36.

Bond was buried in the cemetery of St. Michan's Church, Dublin. The "enlightened republican" principles of Bond were eulogised by his political associate and fellow prisoner, William James MacNeven. Bond's widow Lucy moved with her family from Ireland to the US, and died at Baltimore in 1843.

The Oliver Bond flats in the Liberties area of Dublin are named after him.
