= Battle of Clonard =

Battle of the Irish Rebellion of 1798

- Part of the Irish Rebellion
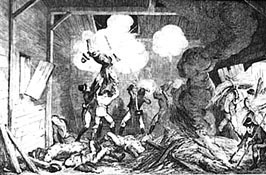
- Rebels storming the turret at Tyrrells house 1798 by George Cruikshank in 1864
Date	11 July 1798
Location	Clonard 53.437973°N 6.997854°W
Result	British victory

Belligerents
United Irishmen	Great Britain; Ireland

Commanders and leaders
Anthony Perry	Lieutenant Thomas Tyrrell

Strength
2,000–4,000	27

Casualties and losses
150 dead and around 200 wounded	3 dead and 8 wounded

The Battle of Clonard occurred on 11 July 1798 near Leinster Bridge in the townland of Clonard New, County Kildare during the Irish Rising of that year. A combined force of between 2,000 and 4,000 United Irishmen engaged a force of 27 British loyalist militia troops led by Lieutenant Thomas Tyrrell over 6 hours in an attempt to cross the River Boyne. The defenders held the fortified house until they were reinforced by a Sergeant and 11 men of the Northumberland Fencibles and 15 men of the Kinnegad Cavalry under the command and including Lt Edward Haughton when the rebels were routed and retreated to Carbury, County Kildare. The attack on Clonard was a disastrous failure and a severe blow to the surviving rebels. Many of the County Kildare rebels returned to their homes while many of the Meath men were dissuaded from joining the rebellion by the defeat and due to much of their existing stocks of ammunition being wasted in the battle.

== Background ==
After the rebel defeat at the battle of White Heaps/Ballygullen, the last major engagement in County Wexford, the surviving rebel forces moved into County Kildare on the 9th of July and sought to spread the rebellion on their way north to Ulster under the command of Anthony Perry, Garret and William Byrne, Edward Fitzgerald, and a local priest named Kearns they reinforced the army formerly under the command of Michael Reynolds who died at the Battle of Naas in late June.

While in Newbridge the rebels captured some kegs of fresh gunpowder. It was then decided amongst the rebel leaders that they would attack the small garrison at Clonard and cross the River Boyne and instead make their way west to join up with other rebel forces. Clonard was chosen as it was believed there was a store of arms at the garrison and to also to avoid the thousands of British troops who were combing Kildare for them.

== Prior to the battle ==
=== Fox's Hill ===
Late in June Lt. Tyrrell received reports from locals that a large body of around 600 rebels had stationed themselves at Fox's Hill just outside of Rathmolyon and had set about raiding the locals.

Tyrrell set out to Kinnegad to gather reinforcements and sent a rider to Edenderry for additional men once gathered they set out for Fox's Hill. The Clonard Cavalry & Clonard Supplementaries under the command of Lt. Tyrrell in conjunction with the Kinnegad Yeoman Cavalry under Lt. Houghton and a small party of the Northumberland Fencibles began the attack with the Supplementaries in the lead supported by the Fencibles and Yeomen, the Edenderry force which consisted of the Canal Legion under Captain Wakely, a detachment of the Limerick Militia under Colonel Gough and the Coolestown Cavalry under Lt. Williams pressed the rebels from the opposite side attempting to surround the rebels. The rebels were routed and many slaughtered in the vicious fight which resulted in a British victory and saw the rebel leader Casey, his brother and another leader killed and their bodies brought to Edenderry where they were left exposed for several days.

In the aftermath of Fox's Hill the Clonard Cavalry & Supplementaries returned to Tyrrell House in Clonard and kept guard over the bridge, receiving no intelligence of local rebels they were vigilant each night and throughout the day frequently returned to Clonard village for recreation. Tyrrell House had since the beginning of the rebellion been fortified, the house was owned by Thomas' brother Captain John Tyrrell, magistrate of counties Kildare and Meath, who having a confirmed a threat on his life retired with his family to England leaving his brother Thomas in charge of the Clonard forces with the house becoming the barracks.

== The battle ==
On the morning of Wednesday 11 July, Richard Allen nephew to Lt. Thomas Tyrrell and a member of Clonard Cavalry rode into the courtyard of Tyrrell House around 11 o'clock and reported that he had been pursued by a piquet guard of rebels he managed to evade the force and reported that he was sure a considerable force was approaching. The alarm was raised and an attempt made to gather the men in the surrounding area not all were at the barracks, in total only 27 men were raised including Thomas and his 3 sons Thomas jnr aged 15, George aged 16 and Adam aged 17.

As the approaching force was expected along the Dublin road six members of the corps including Richard, Thomas jnr and George took position in an old turret at the very edge of the garden by the road to the bridge, some other outposts were established around the property and ammunition provided, the bulk of the force including Lt. Tyrrell setting up in the main house. Lt. Tyrrell chose the best marksmen of the corps setting them up in windows with the best view for harassing the rebels and set the other men about the task for reloading the muskets and carabines, the marksmen had orders to fire only when they had a clear shot. As soon as the main gate was closed and the defenders in position the advanced guard of around 300 rebel cavalry led by a rebel commander called Farrell came up the road approaching the turret at full trot.

The 1st shot was fired by Thomas Tyrrell jnr killing Farrell this was then followed by a volley from the defenders and the cavalry scattered for cover beyond the range of the defenders fire. The rebel infantrymen came up next using the cover of the wall to pass by the turret while some took position behind a dense hedgerow opposite the main wall were they began a constant barrage of fire upon the turret to suppress the defenders. A second group of infantry approached from the south attempting to surround the house were joined by the men who had passed the turret and they stationed around 20 men on the bridge to block reinforcement from the west and capture the bridge within moments of stationing the men the marksmen in the house focused fire on the bridge killing a dozen of the men on it and scattering the rest the rebels didn't attempt to take the bridge again during the engagement and communication along the western road was preserved.

The rebels regrouped after the two failed attacks and resolved to storm the house. A large portion attacked the house from the south penetrating into the gardens while a small group attacked the turret directly gaining access to the ground floor were they found the ladder had been pulled up the rebels. They attempted to access the loft of the turret by climbing upon each other's shoulders but they were killed by the defenders as fast as they appeared, some rebels fired their muskets through the roof at the defenders whilst others ran their pikes up through the gaps with no effect in total 27 rebels lay dead in the attempt to access the loft and so they decided to burn the defenders out piling hay from the neighboring hay yard under the tower and setting it alight. Two of the defenders Michael Cusack and George Tyrrell attempted to fight their way out through the smoke and were shot and piked to death. Richard Allen, Thomas Tyrrell Jnr and 2 others jumped 20 feet from one of the upper windows into the hay yard and made their way to the main house safely avoiding the rebels.

The rebels set fire to the toll house at the bridge and some of the cabins along the river to confuse the defending garrison and draw their attention away from the rebels pouring into the gardens and approaching the house but the defenders continued firing in all corners. The battle had raged for nearly 6 hours now and the rebels continued their attack with no sign of abating when in west was seen loyalist reinforcements approaching. That morning one of the corps who, being in the village at the time the battle began, couldn't reach the barracks and so went to Kinnegad for reinforcements. He returned with 11 men of the Northumberland Fencibles led by a Sargent and 14 men of the Kinnegad infantry under Lt. Houghton, the reinforcements set up on the bridge and with a few volleys cleared the road and proceeded toward the house firing volley after volley while Lt. Tyrrell and some of his men sallied out the house to engage the rebels which numbered around 400 in the gardens the marksmen in the house continued their volleys from the upper floors and both forces began route the rebels from the gardens. Some of the rebels were posted on a small hill in the gardens topped with old fir trees which gave them good protection and the other group of rebels were in the hedgerows. Lt. Tyrrell and the loyalists charged the rebels in the hedgerows defeating them the remainder fled to their comrades on the hill and into the surrounding countryside, the loyalists pressed their momentum up the hill to engage the last of the rebels still within the walls Richard Allen was shot through the left arm with the bullet passing through to his side and he died on the hill while 5 other loyalists were wounded during a fierce fight for the hill. In the end the loyalists won the hill and the day with the remaining rebels outside the walls still under constant fire from the house and the reinforcements retreating in defeat.

Though the day was won Lt. Tyrrell pressed on south as his wife Martha never made it to the barrack house at the beginning of the day, she had been en route south to their own house at Kilrainy when she hearing of the attack attempted to get back to Tyrrell House she was captured on the way by rebels and taken to the edge of Clonard where she was held captive for the duration, there was debate among the rebels as to how she would be treated in the end she wasn't mistreated. During the rebel retreat she was taken by the rebel commander Perry and others as a hostage and they journeyed for a few miles she begged to be let go and after the rebel Captain Garret Byrne of Ballymanus escorted her to the rear of the retreating group and released her where she thanked Captain Byrne and promised to help him if it was ever required and she walked back to Clonard and reunited with her husband and surviving sons.

== Aftermath ==
The rebels after the defeat retreated to Carbury and spent the night at Lord Harberton's house. On the 12th of July they marched through Johnstown and nineteen-mile-house while being pursued by Lt. Col. Gough and a party of the Limerick Militia and Edenderry Yeomen who engaged them and defeated a large portion of the surviving rebels who were pursued then by General Myers with some detachments of the Dublin Yeomanry and Buckinghamshire Militia though they didn't engage the rebels they drove them toward Slane where they were attacked by General Meyrick and others finally defeating the rebel army. Some of the rebel leaders Anthony Perry and the priest Kearns were captured attempting to cross the bog at Clonbullogue they were taken prisoner and interrogated it is noted that throughout his imprisonment Perry was upbeat, polite and helpful were as Kearns was sullen and morose, they were then both executed under martial law.

== Bibliography ==
- Jones, John (1799). An Impartial Narrative Of The Most Important Engagements Which Took Place Between His Majesty's Forces And The Rebels, During The Irish Rebellion, 1798. Jone Jones, 91 Bride Street, Dublin.
- Musgrave, Richard (1802). Memoirs of the different rebellions in Ireland from the arrival of the English: also, a particular detail of that which broke out the XXIIID of May, MDCCXCVIII; with the history of the conspiracy which preceded it. Robert Marchbank, Dublin.
