= Naas Town Hall =

Municipal building in Naas, County Kildare, Ireland

- Halla an Bhaile Nás na Ríogh
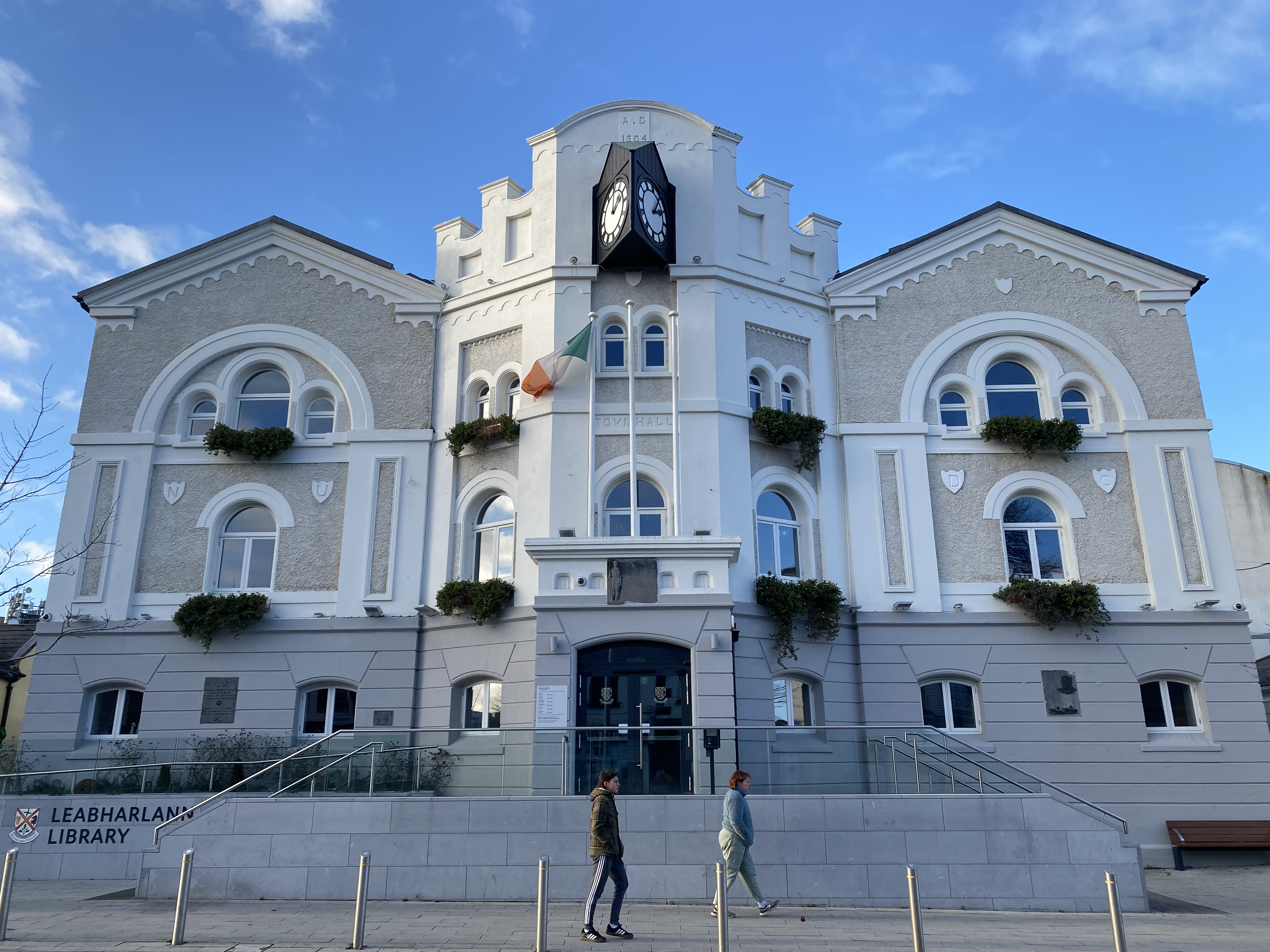
- Naas Town Hall

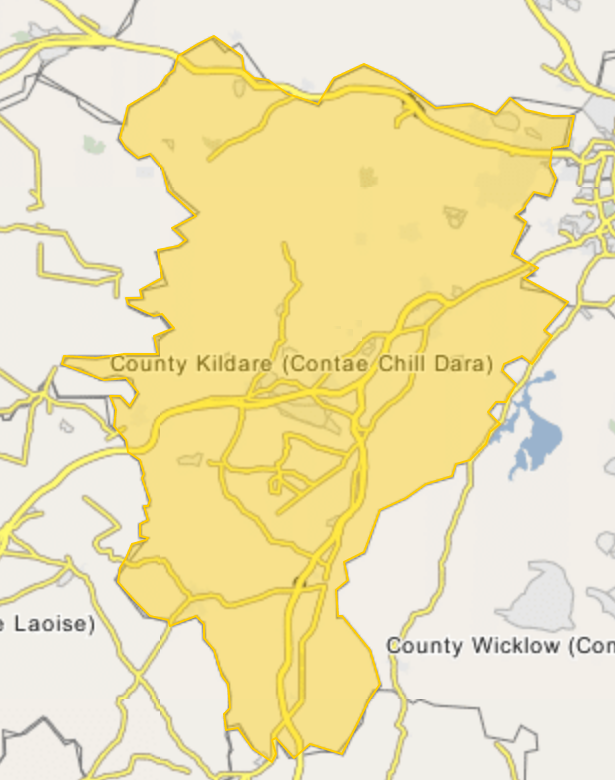
- Location within County Kildare

General information
- Architectural style: Italianate style
- Location: 29 Main Street North, Naas, Ireland
- Coordinates: 53.2181°N 6.6638°W
- Completed: 1796

Naas Town Hall (Irish: Halla an Bhaile Nás na Ríogh) is a municipal building in Main Street North, Naas, County Kildare, Ireland. The building accommodated the offices of Naas Town Council until 2014 but has subsequently been converted into a public library and cultural centre.

== History ==
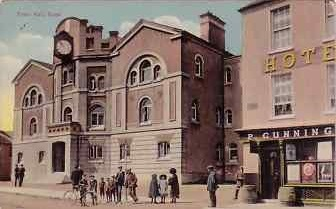
Naas Town Hall in early 20th century

The building was commissioned by Naas Corporation as a gaol in the late 18th century. The site selected by the corporation had been occupied by a 14th century fortified house, known as White's Castle, which was demolished in around 1786. The new building was designed in an austere and plain style, built in stone and completed in 1796. The original design involved a symmetrical main frontage of five bays facing onto Main Street North with the end bays projected forward as pavilions. The central section of three bays contained a doorway with voussoirs and a keystone on the ground floor, and had small sash windows on all three floors. The end bays were decorated by large arches on the second floor but were devoid of any windows. The gaol was extensively used during the Battle of Naas, in which the town was defended from rebels led by Michael Reynolds during the Irish Rebellion of 1798.

Naas Corporation was abolished under the Municipal Corporations (Ireland) Act 1840 and the building became empty until it was acquired by the newly-formed town commissioners in 1854. It was converted into a town hall and offices for the town commissioners in 1861, and a distinctive triangular projecting clock with two faces, designed and manufactured by John Chancellor of Dublin, was paid for by public subscription and installed on the front of the building in 1866. The building became the offices and meeting place of Naas Urban District Council when it was formed in 1900.

The building was re-faced by a local contractor, John Eacret, to a design by John Joseph Inglis of Dublin in the Italianate style in the early 20th century. The central bay was canted forward and given a porch with a segmental headed doorway; there was a round headed window on the first floor and a pair of small round headed windows on the second floor, all surmounted by a segmental gable. The bays flanking the central bay were fenestrated in a similar style and were surmounted by castellated parapets. Meanwhile, the end bays were fenestrated by segmental headed windows on the ground floor, by round headed windows on the first floor and by Venetian windows on the second floor, all surmounted by the original open pediments. A Carnegie library was established on the ground floor to the right of the doorway. Following completion of the works, the building re-opened on 1 November 1905.

On 18 May 1915, the Irish songwriter, Percy French, gave a concert in the town hall. Then, on 15 April 1918 as part of the Irish anti-conscription movement of 1918, a demonstration was held outside the town hall to protest proposals by the Lloyd George government to introduce conscription in Ireland: attendees included the local member of parliament, John O'Connor.

The building continued to be used as the offices of the urban district council until 2002, and subsequently as the offices of the successor town council. However, it ceased to be the local seat of government in 2014, when the council was dissolved and administration of the town was amalgamated with Kildare County Council in accordance with the Local Government Reform Act 2014.

An extensive programme of refurbishment works, intended to allow the library service to relocate from Harbour View, commenced on site in November 2020. The works, which created a new cultural centre as well as a new library, were undertaken by Duggan Lynch at a cost of €5.9 million to a design by Deaton Lysaght Architects, and were substantially complete by late 2023.
