= Augustinian Friary, Naas West, County Kildare =

Monastery in County Kildare, Ireland

The Augustinian Friary of Naas West, County Kildare, Ireland was founded in the late 14th century. No details of its founding or history are known to exist in the historical record. By 1540, only some of its buildings remained intact. It last appears in the historical record in 1584, as a property leased to Nicholas Alymer. It is no longer extant and its exact former location is not known. It has been suggested "that it 'may have been in the vicinity of Friary river, whose name suggests that there was a religious house here.'"
