= Moat Theatre =

Theatre and arts centre in Naas, County Kildare, Ireland

- Amharclann an Mhóta

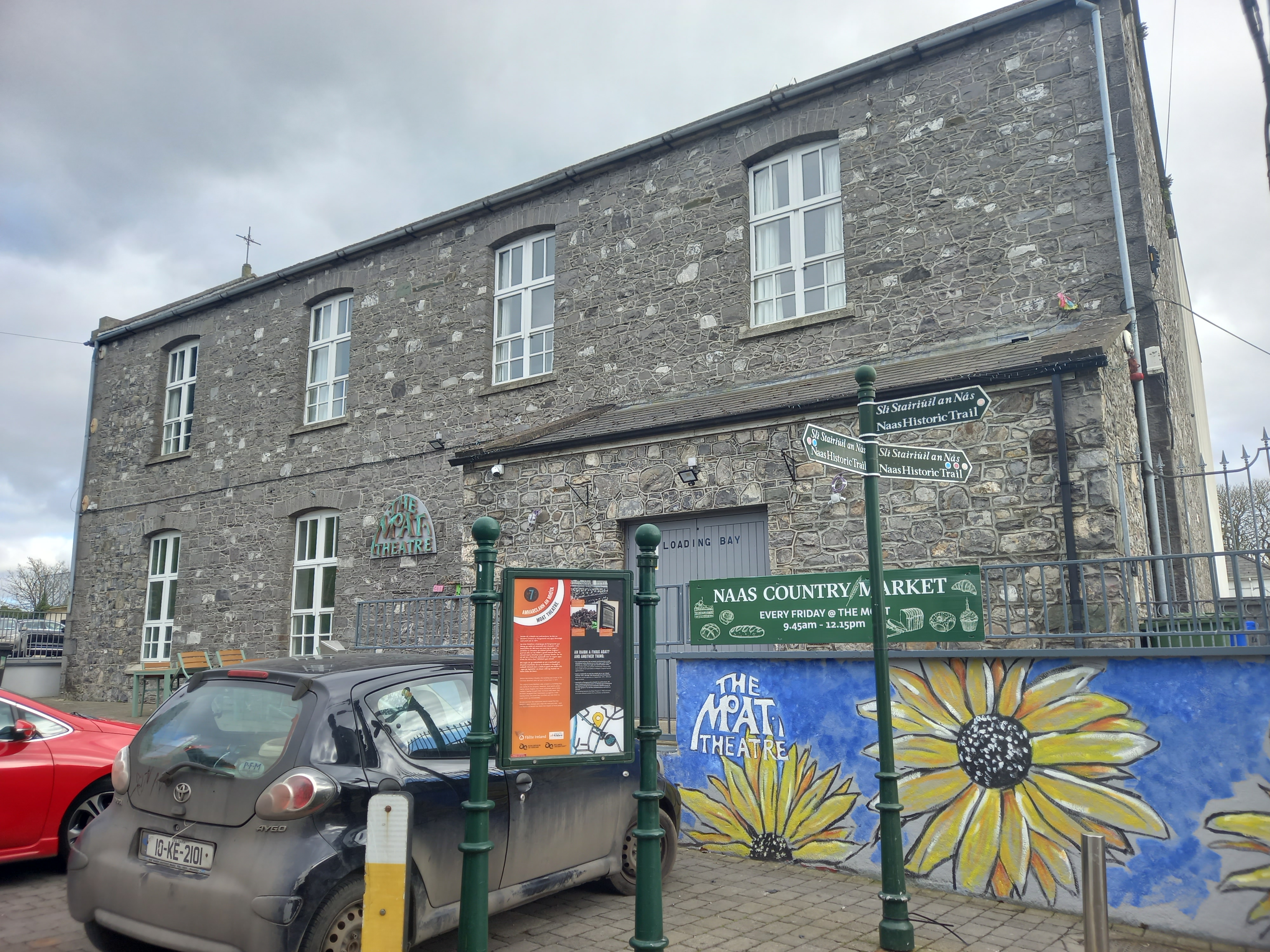

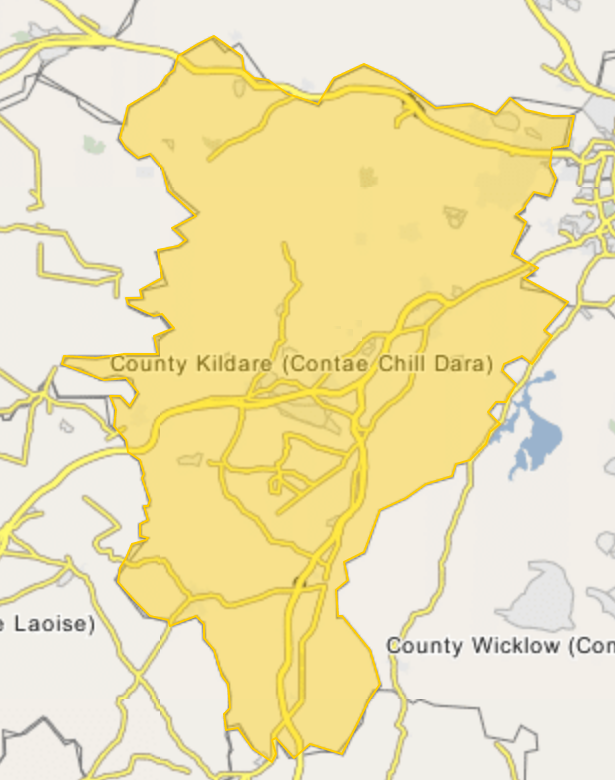
- Location within County Kildare
- Address: Abbey Road
- Location: Naas, County Kildare, Ireland
- Coordinates: 53.218531°N 6.664107°W
- Capacity: 200
- Public transit: Naas bus stop (opposite post office)

Construction
- Opened: 1963
- Expanded: 11 April 2003

Website
- www.moattheatre.com

The Moat Theatre (Irish: Amharclann an Mhóta) is a theatre and arts centre in Naas, County Kildare, Ireland.

== History ==
The theatre is owned by 'The Moat Club', which was formed in 1954 with the intention of providing the Naas area with facilities to be used for dramatic theatre and table tennis. In 1960 the Moat Club purchased the Christian Brothers school and converted the upper rooms into a hall for table tennis.

The lower rooms were converted into a 125-seat theatre in 1963, and called The Moat Theatre. It was renovated in the early 2000s, re-opening in 2003 as an accessible, 200-seat studio/black box theatre with funding from the Department of Arts, Sports and Tourism and Naas Town Council.

The Moat Club and Moat Theatre derive their names from the ancient motte, a reputed meeting-site of the Kings of Leinster.

== Events ==
The theatre hosts local, national and international stage productions, live music and comedy, children's theatre, art exhibitions, classes and workshops. A country market has been held in the foyer on Friday mornings since 2019.

The "Brigid 2025, Spirit of Kildare Festival" took place from 24 January to 3 February 2025, with the St Brigid's Day performance taking place at the Moat Theatre.
