= Michael Reynolds (United Irishmen) =

Michael Reynolds (c. 1771–1798) was the leader of the United Irish Kildare rebels during the Battle of Naas.

== Life ==
Reynolds was a farmer from Johnstown near Naas in County Kildare. Described by Madden as "a great man of muscular strength and activity, of a short stature and dark complexion and somewhat celebrated in the country for his horsemanship." At some point before 1798 Reynolds joined the United Irishmen, a secret society whose aim was to overthrow British rule and establish an independent, democratic republic in Ireland.

== Rebellion ==
In March 1798, most of the leadership of the Leinster branch of the Society met at the house of Oliver Bond in Dublin. They were arrested here, causing the crippling of the organization. Many of its leaders, such as Russell and Thomas Addis Emmet, were already in prison, while others like Tone and Arthur O'Connor were away in Europe. Meanwhile, Lord Edward Fitzgerald was hiding within from a government net that was closing in around him.

One of the men arrested during this raid was George Cummins, an apothecary and Society leader in Kildare. The remaining members of the Leinster directory appointed Reynolds as his replacement. Finger-pointing soon began as many suspected betrayal. Much of the suspicion fell on Thomas Reynolds (a distant relative to Michael) who was at Bond's during the raid, yet had not been arrested. A few days later, the new leaders met at The Brazen Head pub in Dublin. At the meeting, Michael named his relative Thomas Reynolds as the traitor. Although the committee agreed with him, they rejected Michael's request to execute Thomas Reynolds himself. Thomas Reynolds would live until 1836.

In May, the uprising finally began at Ballymore-Eustace.

== Battle of Naas ==
On 22 May, an arrest warrant was issued with rewards offered for some remaining United Irish leaders in Leinster. Among those leaders were Samuel Neilson and Reynolds.

The Battle of Naas was one of the first engagements of the rebellion. On the night of 23 May a force of over 1000 rebels under Michael Reynolds' command attacked Naas, the strongest Crown garrison in County Kildare, following the successful mobilisation of the United Irishmen, the Defenders and various rebels throughout county Kildare. The garrison at Naas numbered approximately 250 men, supplemented by some local yeomen, some of whom had already deserted to the rebels. Importantly, the defenders had a number of cannons.

The rebel attack was launched from three directions at around 2:30 a.m, achieving a degree of surprise. The onslaught drove Naas' garrison to a barricade outside the gaol which was located on a slight hill at the centre of the town's main street. Rebel assaults on the barricade were eventually beaten back as the military brought two artillery pieces to bear. They then fired at the mass of rebels at close-range as the insurgents advanced on the gaol from the north. Hemmed in by buildings, the rebels were unable to manoeuvre, and cavalry were sent in to take advantage of the confusion. The rebels then began to retreat. The bulk of their casualties (allegedly 135) were inflicted at this stage for the loss of about 25 of the military.

Reynolds escaped, linking up with dispersed United men in the Wicklow Mountains. Later in May, he was one of seven men, led by Samuel Neilson, chosen to try and liberate Lord Edward from Newgate Prison.

== Battle of Hacketstown ==
Hacketstown was a small village in County Carlow with a strategically placed bridge over the River Deneen. The bridge was occupied by the British Army. Trying to cross on 25 June, the United Irishmen lost 12 of their party to British defences. In response, Anthony Perry mobilised a considerably sized force of rebels, gaining the opposite side with minimal loss. The bridge was crowded with men, and with British troops firing at the United men from the ground on either side, Reynolds led a charge of his followers under the bridge and across the river.

The government troops were pushed back to the nearby barracks, which was then besieged by rebels. Reynolds again led a troop of Kildare men, this time in an attempt to scale the barrack walls with ladders. While scaling the walls, Reynolds was hit by a shot in the belly, mortally wounding him. He died a few days later.
