= Naas Presbyterian Church =

- Séipéal Preispitéireach Nás na Ríogh
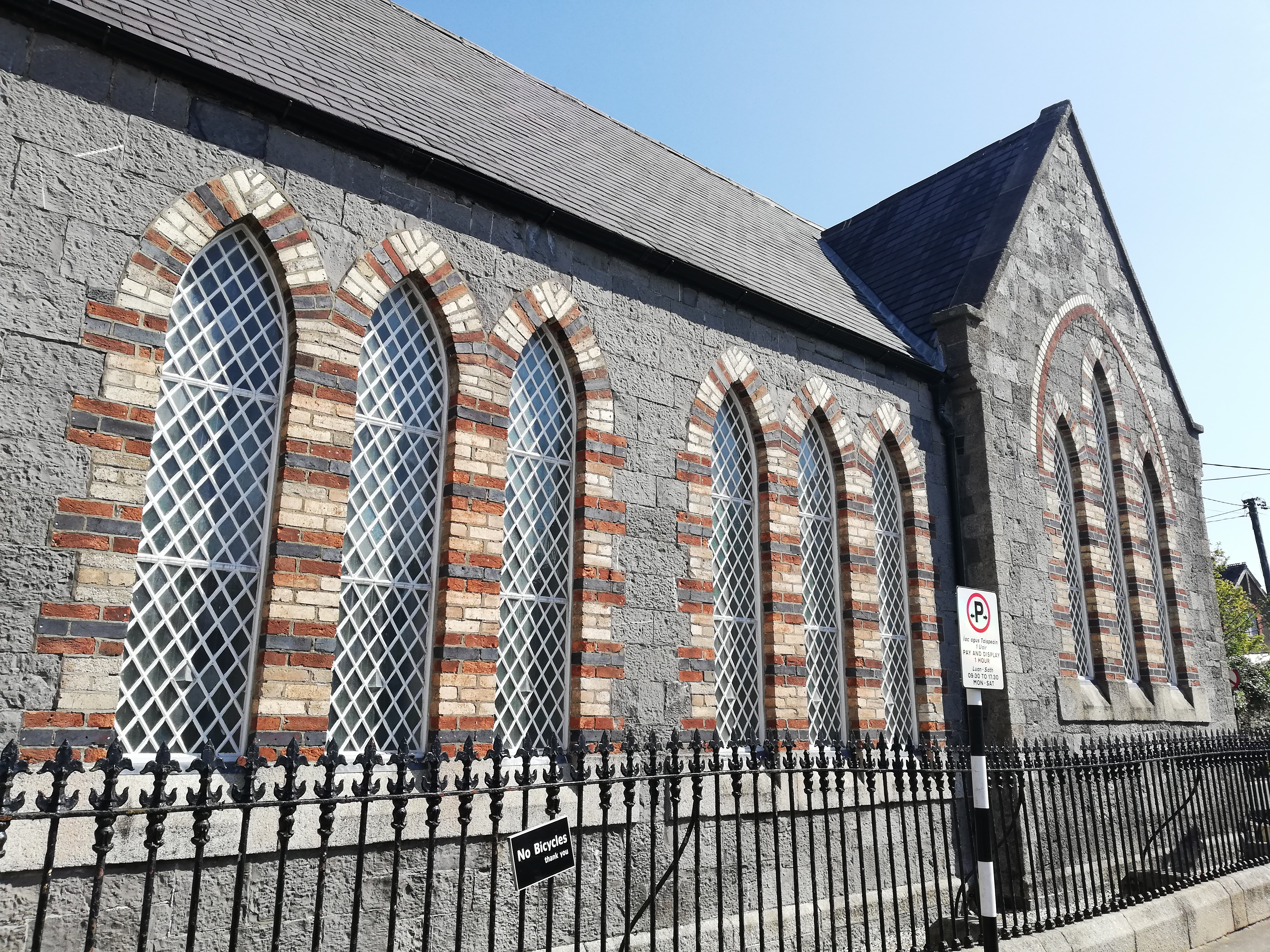
- South wall

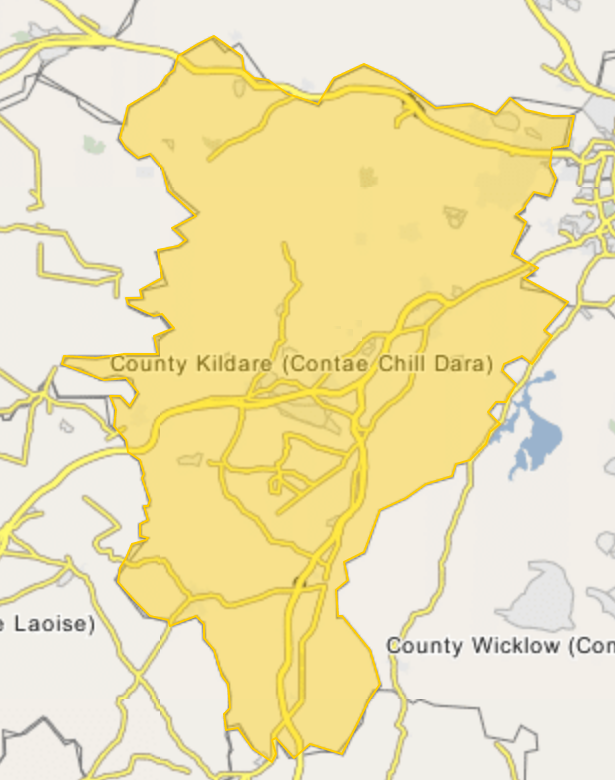
- 53°13′04″N 6°39′49″W
- Location: Main Street North, Naas, County Kildare, Ireland
- Language: English
- Denomination: Presbyterian
- Churchmanship: Reformed and Evangelical

History
- Status: Active

Architecture
- Architect: Duncan Ferguson
- Style: Victorian
- Groundbreaking: 1868
- Completed: 1868

Specifications
- Materials: limestone, granite, vitrified red and yellow brick, timber, iron, glass, slate

Administration
- Province: Presbyterian Church in Ireland

Naas Presbyterian Church is a Presbyterian church in Naas, Ireland.

== Architecture ==
The building is a four-bay structure. The use of limestone, granite and brick create a polychrome brickwork effect, popular at the time.

== History ==
The church was built in 1868 on the site of the former tholsel, John La Touche of Harristown laying the foundation stone. Rose La Touche worshipped there in 1872.

In 1916, a Boyle's patented air-pump ventilator was installed.
