= George Cummins (United Irishmen) =

George Cummins (1768/1770 – 1830), also spelt George Cummings, was a Scotch-Irish American, active in Ireland in the revolutionary Society of United Irishmen and following his return to the United States after the Irish Rebellion of 1798, in the politics of the Democratic-Republican Party.

== Life ==
Cummins was born in North Carolina in either 1768 or 1770 to a wealthy Scotch-Irish American landowning family who had emigrated to America in the early 1700s. With ties across the Atlantic, his family owned lands in Ireland as well as America. When he was about 22 years old, he inherited land in County Down, Ireland, and moved there permanently. As an aspiring apothecary, he attended medical college in Edinburgh & studied to become a doctor. After graduating he removed to Kildare to practice his apothecary trade.

== The United Irishmen ==
Inspired by American independence and by Thomas Paine's defence of the French Revolution, The Rights of Man, the Society of United Irishmen was founded in Belfast and Dublin in 1791 by liberal Presbyterians ("Dissenters") and Anglicans ("Protestants") committed to work with Ireland's Catholic majority to secure a representative parliament in Dublin. Founding members included members included Wolfe Tone, Samuel Neilson and William Drennan.

In the mid-1790s Lord Edward Fitzgerald resettled close to Kildare town. Fitzgerald, a veteran of the American Revolutionary War, was not yet a member of the United men, but his home quickly became a hotbed of local radical opinion. His sister Lucy wrote that Cummins, as well as national organisers like Fitzgerald’s close friend Arthur O’Connor, became regular visitors. When the government, at war with the new French Republic, refused further reform, Fitzgerald and the United leadership began organising for an insurrection. In spring 1798 Lord Edward, by then the Society's Secretary was on the run and nominated Cummins to be his replacement while he was in hiding.

== 1798 rebellion and the United States ==
In March 1798, Cummins went to Dublin for a meeting with the other senior members of the Society's Leinster Directory. At the house of Oliver Bond, he and the other leaders, including Peter Ivers debated the impending insurrection and the potential for French assistance. However, one of the attendees, Thomas Reynolds, was a government informant and alerted the authorities to the meeting. Major Sirr, the man who would apprehend Lord Edward two months later entered the house and placed them all, apart from Reynolds, under arrest. This crippled the organisation. Many of its leaders, such as Russell and Emmet were already in prison, while others like Tone and Arthur O'Connor were in Europe.

Nonetheless, in May, the uprising finally began. Cummins was replaced as Kildare leader by Michael Reynolds. Beginning in Kildare, the rebellion spread to other counties in Leinster before finally consuming Ulster. Ultimately, the rising failed with enormous bloodshed.

Cummins's trial was held in Dublin. Thomas Reynolds gave evidence against him and the other men arrested at Bond's. Convicted of treason, he was held for two years at Fort George in Scotland with 19 other rebels before being released in 1800. In 1802, he emigrated from Newry, County Down, to the United States where he settled in New York City with his family. There, he joined a cadre of former United Men such as William James MacNeven and Thomas Addis Emmet. He was an active member of the United Irish Society in Brooklyn and was active in their functions, giving an oration to them in 1810.

Immersing himself in the politics of his birth country, he became an active member of the fledgling Democratic-Republican party in New York. He supported James Madison in the 1812 Presidential Election as he couldn't countenance DeWitt Clinton's Federalist leanings.

He practised as a Manhattan physician until his death and served as New York City Health Inspector during this time. He died there in 1833, and he and Emmet are buried in St. Mark's Church in-the-Bowery.
