= Battle of Naas =

1798 battle of the United Irish Rebellion

- Part of the Irish Rebellion
Date	24 May 1798
Location	Naas, County Kildare
Result	Anglo-Irish victory

Belligerents
Irish Republic: United Irishmen; Defenders	(Kingdom of Ireland) British Ireland

Commanders and leaders
Michael Reynolds	coronel lord Gosford

Strength
800-1,000	250

Casualties and losses
~135 killed	~25 killed

The Battle of Naas took place in Ireland on 24 May 1798.

== Background ==
One of the first engagements of the 1798 rebellion, a force of over 1,000 rebels, led by Michael Reynolds attacked Naas, the strongest Crown garrison in County Kildare, following the successful mobilisation of United Irishmen, Defenders and rebels throughout county Kildare on the night of 23 May. The garrison at Naas numbered approximately 250 men, supplemented by a number of local yeomen, some of whom had already deserted to the rebels. Importantly, the defenders had some cannon.

== Attack ==
The rebel attack was launched from three directions at around 2:30 a.m and achieved a degree of surprise, driving the garrison back to a barricade outside the jail, on a slight hill at the centre of the town's main street. Rebel assaults on the barricade were eventually beaten back when the military managed to bring two artillery pieces to bear, firing at close range into the mass of rebels advancing on the then jail from the north. Hemmed in by buildings, the rebels could not manoeuver, and cavalry were sent in to take advantage of the confusion. The rebels then began to retreat and the bulk of their casualties, about 135, were inflicted at this stage for the loss of about 25 of the military.

On the same night the Battle of Prosperous about 6 miles north of Naas resulted in a rebel success.
