= Clonard, County Meath =

Village in County Meath, Ireland

Clonard Cluain Ioraird
- Village
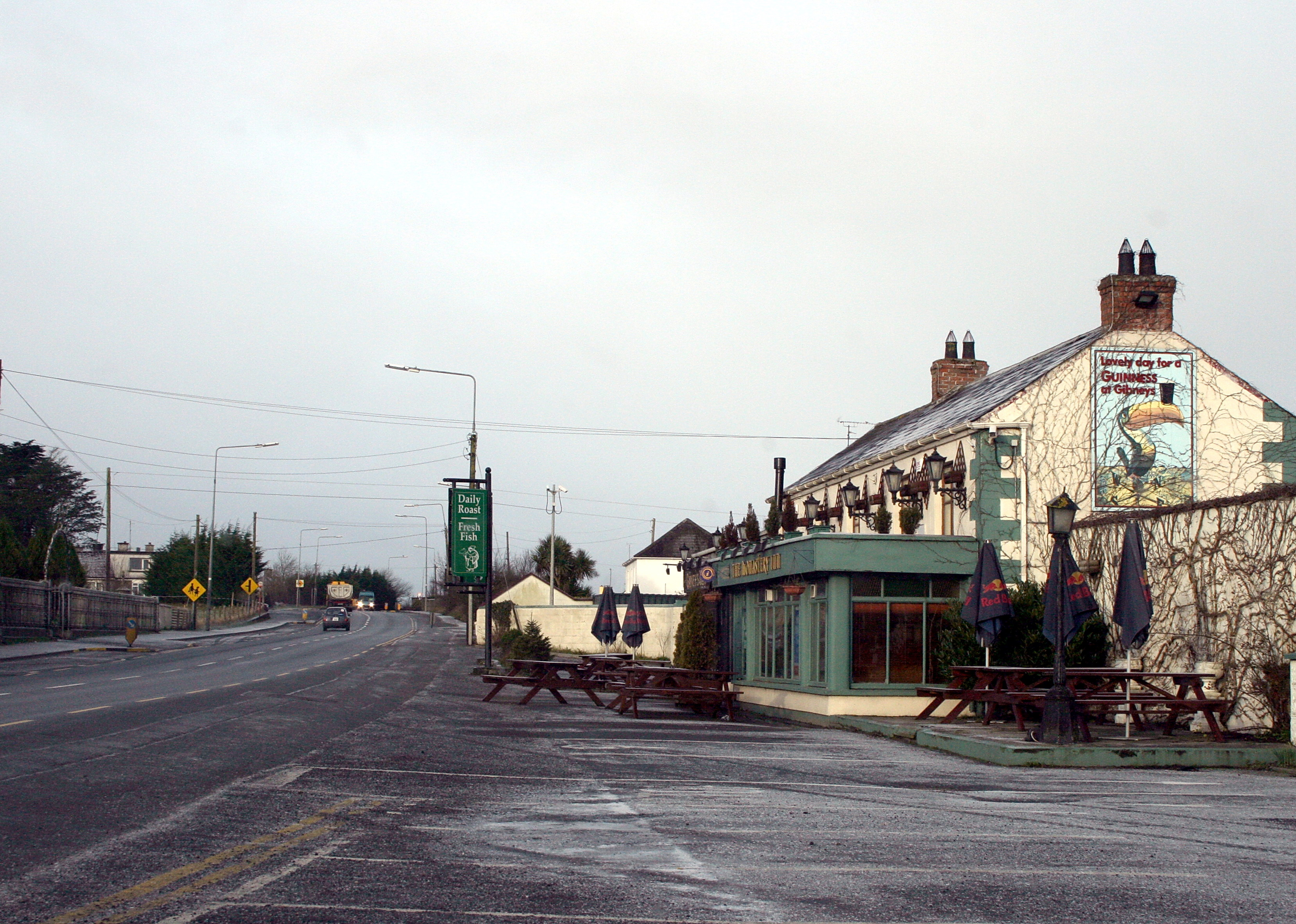

- Location in Ireland
- Coordinates: 53°27′07″N 7°01′19″W
- Country: Ireland
- Province: Leinster
- County: County Meath

Population (2022)
  - Total: 364
- Time zone: UTC+0 (WET)
  - Summer (DST): UTC-1 (IST (WEST))

Clonard (Irish: Cluain Ioraird, meaning 'Iorard's meadow') is a small village in County Meath, Ireland. It lies on the R148 regional road between the towns of Kinnegad and Enfield. This road was the main road between Dublin and Galway until the construction of the M4 motorway. It is still used by traffic avoiding the toll on the M4.

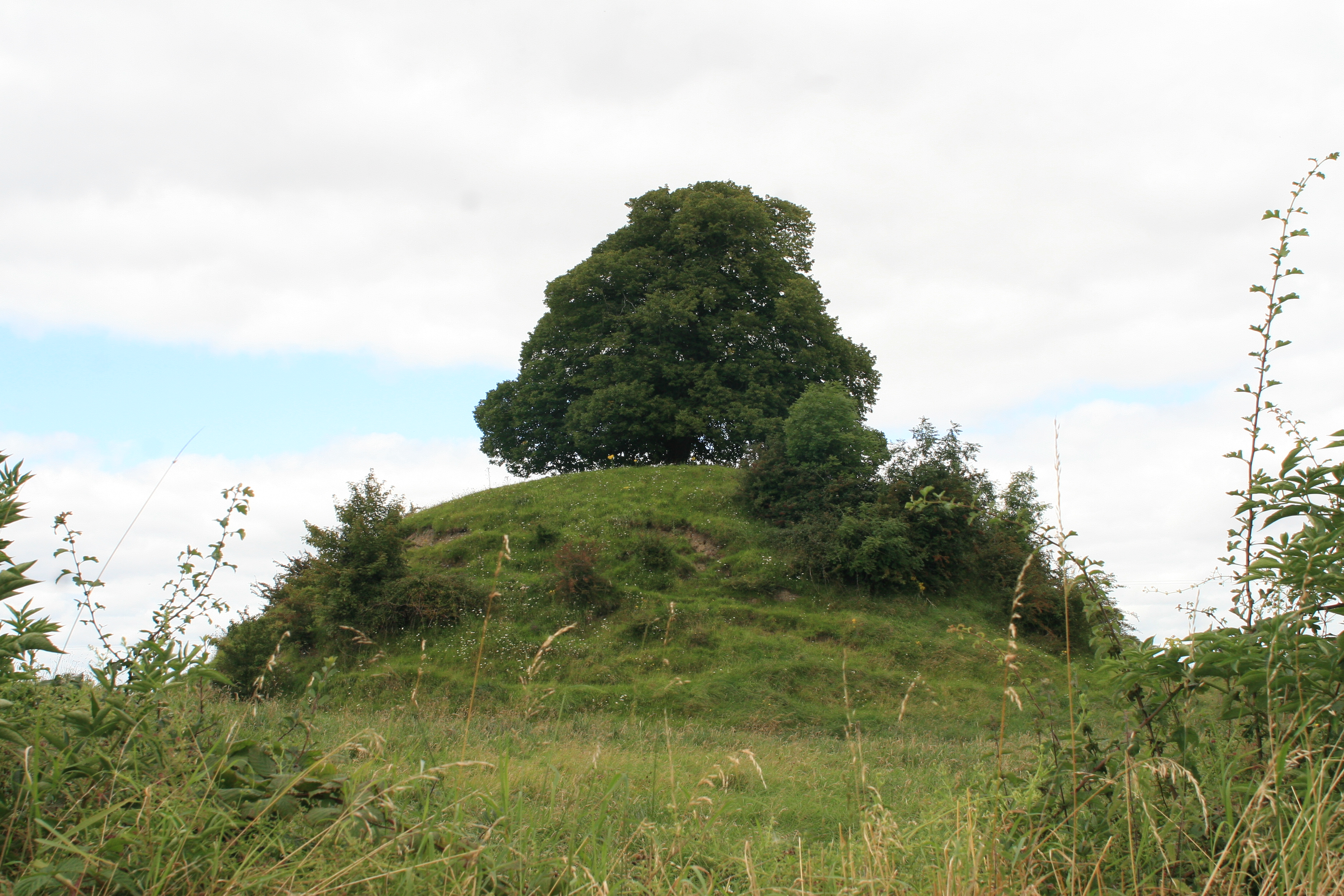
Clonard Motte

Clonard is notable for being one of the earliest Christian sites in Ireland, being linked with the first Irish bishop Palladius c. 450 and as the location of a major early medieval monastery Clonard Abbey, founded in the 6th century by St. Finnian. The village is in a civil parish of the same name.

Around 1177, Hugh de Lacy, Lord of Meath, built a motte-and-bailey fortification at Clonard.

During the 1798 Rebellion on 11 July 1798 the Battle of Clonard took place at the Tyrrell fortified house (now in ruins) beside Leinster Bridge between around 2,000 United Irishmen and 27 British loyalists, the battle ended in a decisive British victory.

The village contains a Catholic church, a graveyard and a primary school.

It is served by Bus Éireann services to Dublin and West of Ireland.

== See also ==
- List of towns and villages in Ireland
