= Anthony Perry =

Irish rebel leader

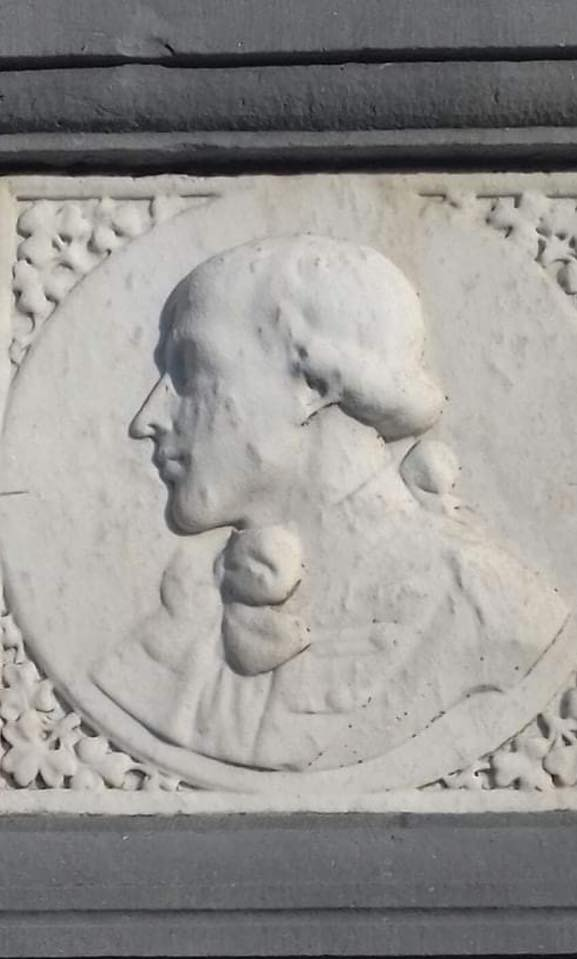
A sculpted image of Anthony Perry of Perrymount, Inch, Co. Wexford, upon the Fr. Michael Murphy memorial in Arklow, County Wicklow. The image of Perry is placed in the position of Wolfe Tone's name and vice versa.

Anthony Perry (c. 1760– 21 July 1798), known as the "screeching general", was one of the leaders of the United Irish Wexford rebels during the 1798 rebellion.

== Background ==
Perry was born in County Down, Ireland to a Protestant family and lived a prosperous life at Inch, near the Wexford/Wicklow border as a gentleman farmer.

He enlisted in the local yeomanry corps as a second lieutenant responding to the Government's appeal to save the kingdom from radicalism during the height of anti-Jacobin paranoia in the mid-1790s. He took the United Irish Oath in 1797 and was made a colonel.

== Arrest and torture ==
The arrival of the counter-insurgency campaign in Wexford, embodied by the dispatch of the North Cork Militia, ensured that high-profile radicals like Perry would be the first to be subjected to arrest and interrogation. On 23 May Perry was arrested and taken by the North Cork Militia to Gorey for interrogation. After enduring 48 hours of torture including being pitchcapped, Perry broke and revealed some names of leaders in south Wexford. These leaders were quickly arrested, and Perry was released on 26 May.

== The rebellion erupts ==
While the authorities concentrated on extracting intelligence about the rebel organisation from southern leaders such as Bagenal Harvey, Edward Fitzgerald, and John Henry Colclough, the rebellion erupted rapidly after being sparked off by a clash at The Harrow where rebels under Fr. John Murphy attacked and defeated a small yeoman cavalry force. A bloody series of raids for arms and attacks on loyalist forces ensued across the northern half of the county countered by roaming bands of yeomen burning and killing indiscriminately. Victories at battle of Oulart Hill and Enniscorthy followed, leaving the rebels in total control of the area between Enniscorthy and Gorey by 29 May.

Despite his horrific wounds, Perry reported to the rebel camp at Vinegar Hill, Enniscorthy on 29 May and was appointed as second in command to the northern army. His first command ended in defeat when indiscipline and lack of firearms led to a bloody defeat by the militia at Ballyminaun Hill. However, he was then instrumental together with Fr. Edward Roche in planning the devastating counterattack upon an advancing British spearhead at the Battle of Tuberneering on 4 June which destroyed half of the British army in North Wexford in one fell swoop.

== 4–9 June ==
The victory at Tuberneering shocked the military who withdrew as far as Wicklow town to regroup in safety and gave Perry his nickname the "screeching general" from his practice of screaming at the enemy when leading rebel attacks. The rebels failed to follow up the victory despite the fact that much of County Wicklow, including Arklow town, was left unoccupied by the British during these critical days.

Part of the reason for this failure to effectively follow up the victory was undoubtedly down to the fact that the rebel forces lacked military discipline, but also that the victorious rebels took advantage of their new power to settle old scores by hunting down and taking revenge upon local enemies. For example, on 7 June, Perry led a raid upon Carnew, the scene of the Carnew executions of rebel suspects on 25 May, burning most of the town to the ground. He also executed two of his yeomen torturers at the Gorey camp on 8 June.

== Battle of Arklow ==
When the decision was finally taken to march on and capture Arklow, Perry's position of leadership was weakened by disagreement over tactics with Fr. John Murphy whose units refused to take part. The march on Arklow was also a leisurely affair with Perry having to personally plead with his men to desist from delaying by countless pausing for hurrahs as they passed his house en route. The disastrous defeat threw the rebels back on the defensive and Perry spent the following days re-organising the scattered rebel forces and skirmishing with probing British units.

== Vinegar Hill and aftermath ==
By 18 June the British had built up a force of some 20,000 troops poised to strike from the north and west. Rebel forces under Perry withdrew from their base at Mountpleasant to meet the threat and formed a large camp at Kilcavan Hill in the north of the county. The British had not expected a large rebel force opposing them until Enniscorthy was reached and Perry's men threatened to throw the British plans into disarray after holding off several British attacks around Kilcavan Hill on 19–20 June. However, a decision was taken by the Rebel council on 20 June to consolidate all rebel forces in Wexford at the main Vinegar Hill camp for the looming battle and Perry withdrew as ordered.

The subsequent defeat on 21 June eliminated rebel control of territory in Wexford but left at least 10,000 armed men willing to fight on. Perry managed to withdraw a force of some thousands to the south towards Wexford town and with other leaders such as Garret Byrne, Edward Fitzgerald and Esmonde Kyan fought their way through Wexford reaching Kilcavan Hill again by 28 June and defeated a pursuing cavalry force at Ballyraheen Hill on 2 July.

== Midlands campaign ==
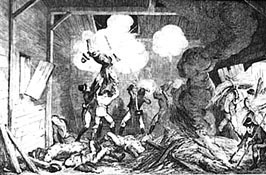
Rebel attack on Clonard (painted by George Cruikshank)

Perry and the surviving column then left Wexford and reached the Wicklow hills on 5 July, having fought off a pursuit led by General James Duff (who ordered the Gibbet Rath executions) at the battle of White Heaps/Ballygullen. Some rebels took to the hills to fight on in a protracted guerrilla war; some returned to their homes; but the bulk set off on a march into the midlands to revive the rebellion under the effective leadership of Perry and Fr. Mogue Kearns.

Crossing into Kildare on 9 July, the rebels captured a keg of gunpowder near Newbridge and linked up with remnants of the Kildare rebels under William Aylmer. Following consultation with their Kildare comrades, it was then decided to swing northwards and some 4000 rebels attacked Clonard in County Meath, partly because they believed stores of arms were located there, but also to elude the thousands of soldiers combing Kildare for rebels.

== March on Ulster ==
The attack on Clonard was a disastrous failure and a severe blow to the surviving rebels. Many Kildare rebels returned to their homes, Meath men were discouraged from joining by the defeat and much of their existing stocks of ammunition were wasted in the futile attack.

A desperate decision was taken to hook up with the rebels in Ulster and the surviving column of no more than 1,000 men was constantly harried by pursuing Government troops until forced to stand and fight on 14 July at Knightstown Bog some miles north of the River Boyne in Co Meath, where they were scattered and defeated. Some rebel units managed to reform and the decision was made to head back to Wexford but the surviving column was intercepted and met final defeat on the evening of the same day at Ballyboghill (County Dublin). Perry probably lost contact with the main rebel force before the final battle and fled towards the west in the company of Fr. Mogue Kearns and others. They reached Edenderry in County Offaly before being captured by the local yeomanry and were both summarily hanged on 21 July. He and Kearns were buried together in the cemetery of Monasteroris, where a large Celtic cross now marks their grave.
