= Naas =

County town of Kildare, Ireland

Naas An Nás / Nás na Ríogh (Irish)
- Town
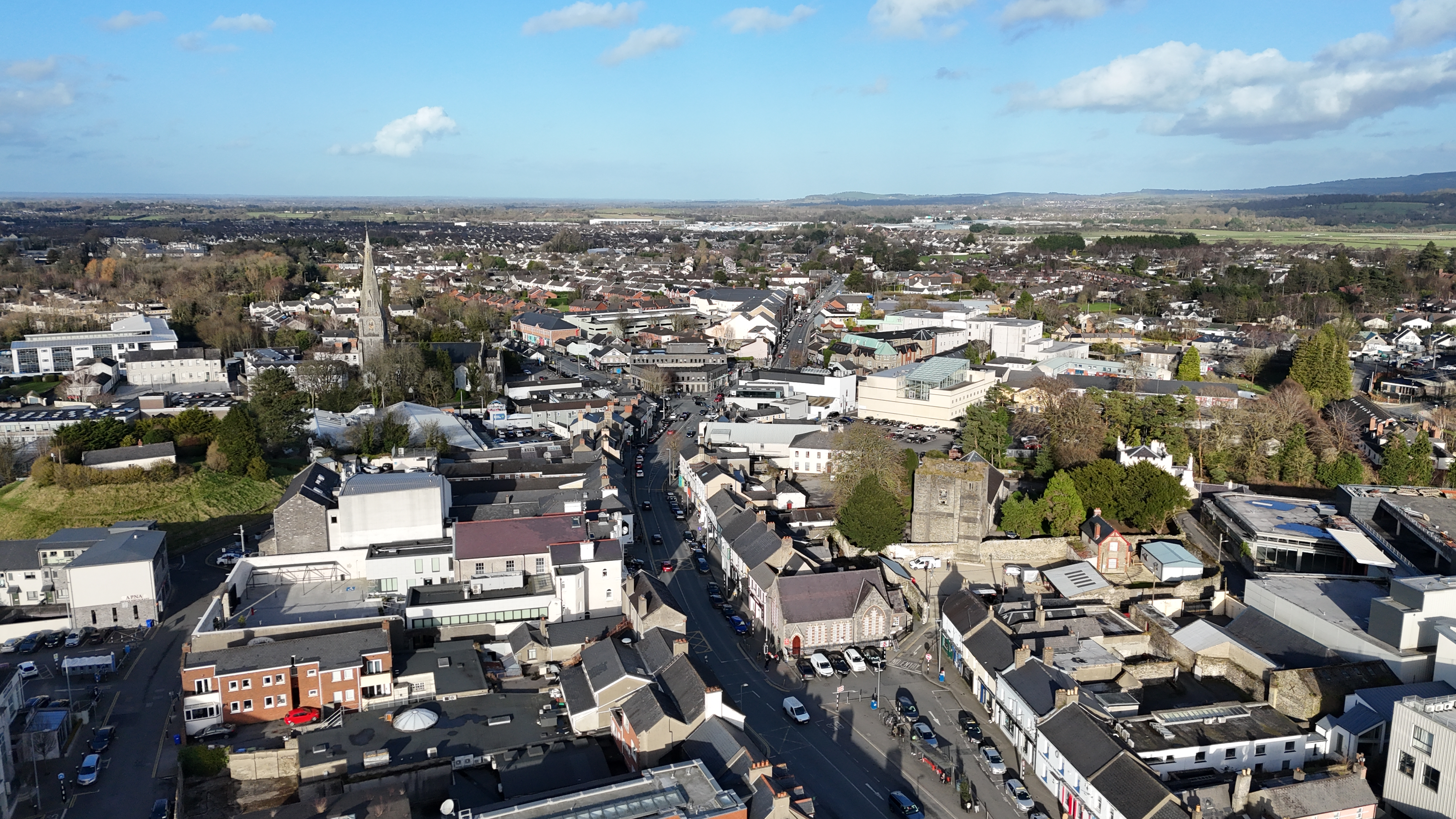
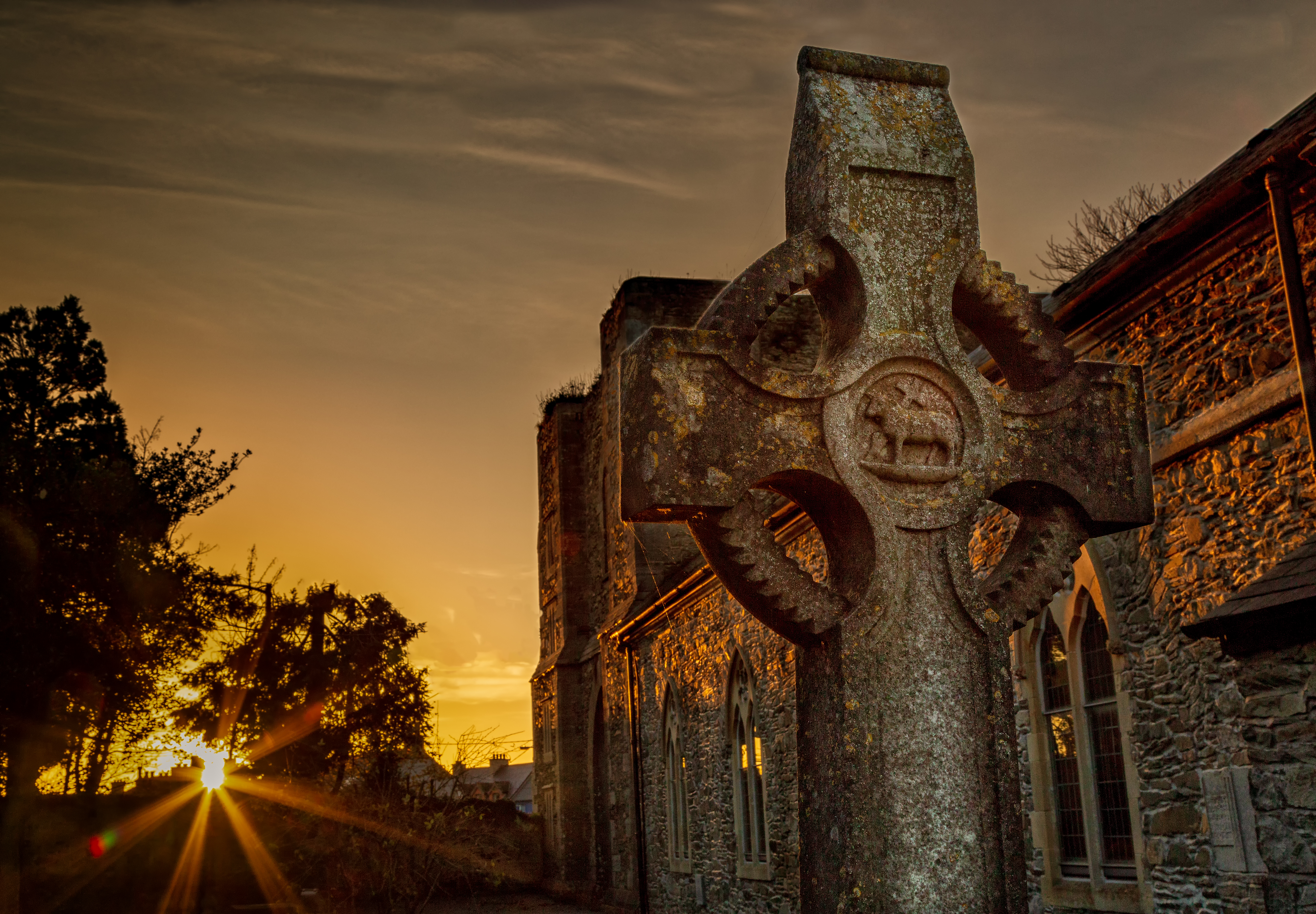
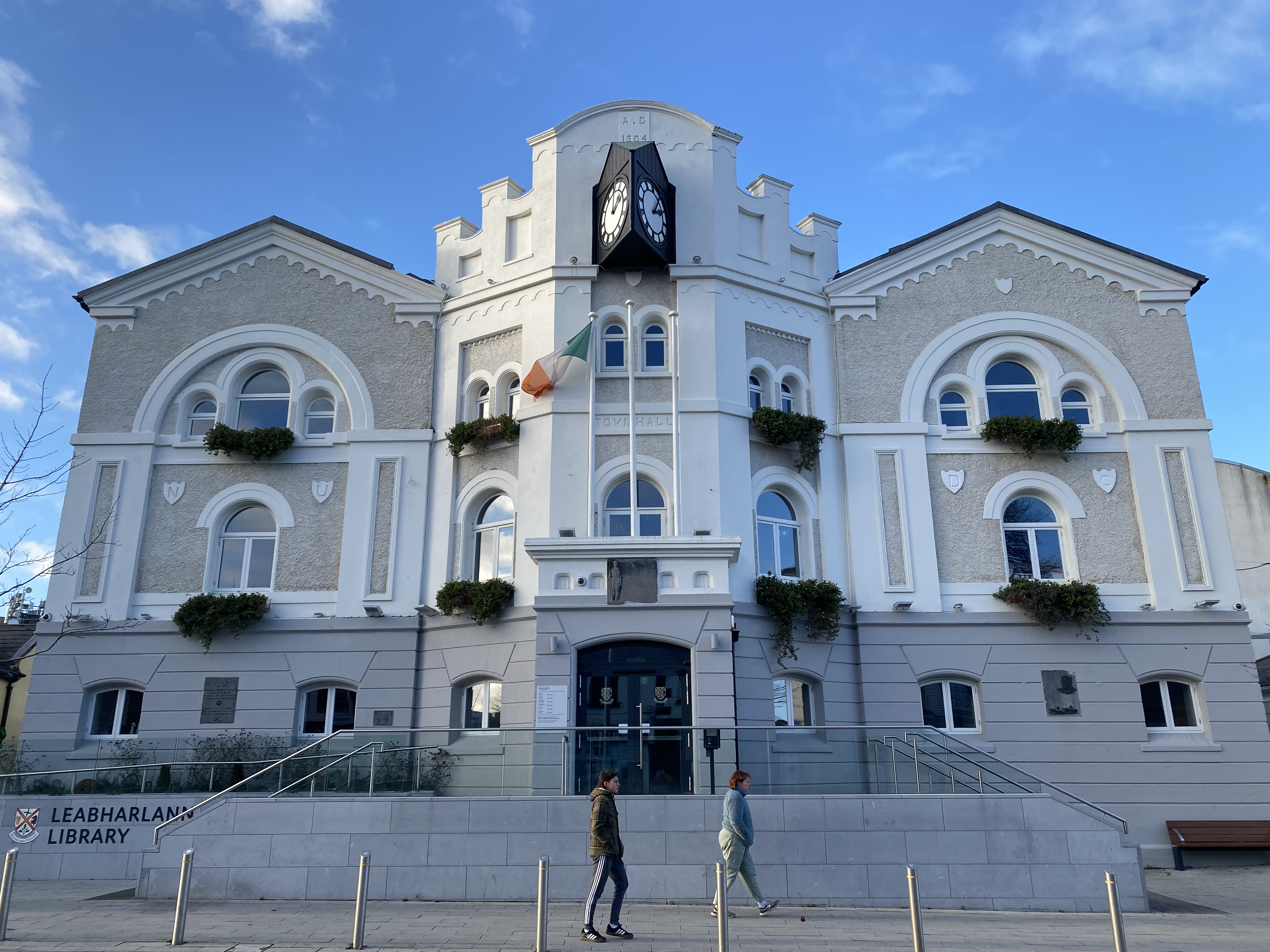
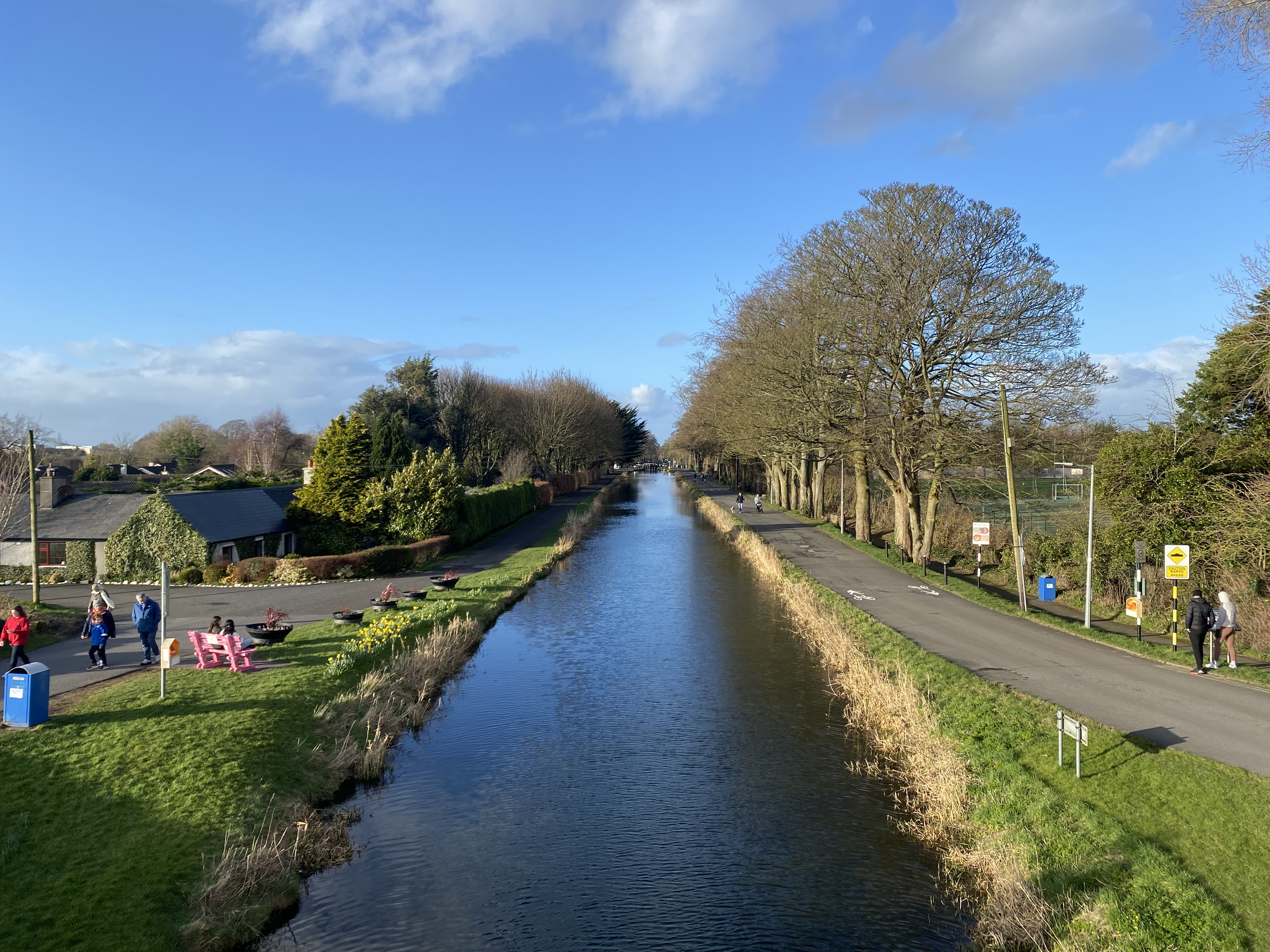
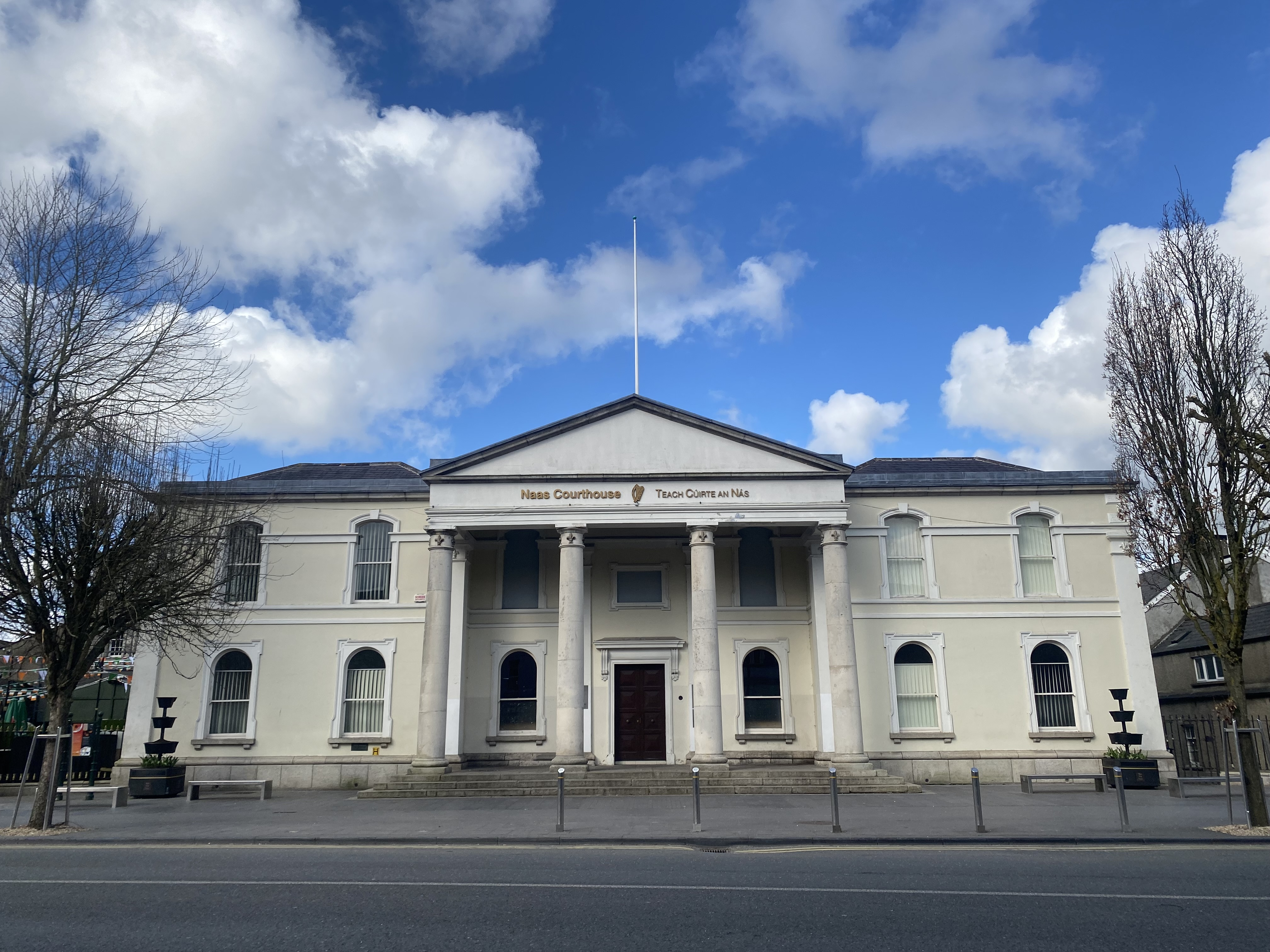
- Town skyline St David's Church Naas Town Hall Grand Canal Naas Courthouse

- Seal
- Motto: Prudens ut Serpens (Latin); Wise as a Serpent
- Location in Ireland
- Coordinates: 53.217°N 6.663°W
- Country: Ireland
- Province: Leinster
- County: Kildare
- Council: Kildare County Council
- Dáil Éireann: Kildare North
- European Parliament: Midlands–North-West
- Elevation: 114 m (374 ft)

Population (2022)
  - Total: 26,180
- Time zone: UTC±0 (WET)
  - Summer (DST): UTC+1 (IST)
- Eircode: W91
- Telephone area code: 045
- Irish Grid Reference: N893196
- Website: www.naas.ie

Historical population
Year	Pop.	±%
1813	2,018	—
1821	3,073	+52.3%
1831	3,808	+23.9%
1841	3,571	−6.2%
1851	3,010	−15.7%
1861	2,966	−1.5%
1871	3,660	+23.4%
1881	3,808	+4.0%
1891	3,735	−1.9%
1901	3,836	+2.7%
1911	3,842	+0.2%
1926	3,442	−10.4%
1936	3,290	−4.4%
1946	3,774	+14.7%
1951	3,731	−1.1%
1956	3,915	+4.9%
1961	4,023	+2.8%
1966	4,529	+12.6%
1971	5,078	+12.1%
1979	7,739	+52.4%
1981	8,345	+7.8%
1986	10,017	+20.0%
1991	11,141	+11.2%
1996	14,074	+26.3%
2002	18,312	+30.1%
2006	20,044	+9.5%
2011	20,573	+2.6%
2016	21,393	+4.0%
2022	26,180	+22.4%

Naas (/neɪs/ NAYSS; Irish: Nás na Ríogh or an Nás [ən̪ˠ ˈn̪ˠaːsˠ]) is the county town of County Kildare in Ireland. In 2022, it had a population of 26,180, making it the largest town in County Kildare (ahead of Newbridge) and the fourteenth-largest urban centre in Ireland.

== History ==
The name of Naas has been recorded in three forms in Irish: Nás na Ríogh, translating as 'Place of Assembly of the Kings'; An Nás, translating to 'the Place of Assembly'; and Nás Laighean, translating to 'Place of assembly of the Leinster Men'.

Irish mythology suggests that the name arose as the burial site of Nás (a wife of Lugh of the Tuatha De Danann). It is also said to be where Lugh held his royal court. Nás was said to have been buried on The Moat Hill (Dún Nás). The Book of Leinster contains the Dindsenchas (lore of places) of Naas with the following verses discussing where the name supposedly came from:

"(Nás)... claims of right the brow and the beauty of the spot, since she is gone, with the noise of combat, how should ye know at all the spot where she died?

"Nás took in hand a deed unwise: (truth and not folly) death o’erwhelmed her; 'tis from her Nás was named, famous perpetually for stern law.

"Nás of the Leinstermen, bright with splendid bounty, ‘tis there the lady was buried; from her it is called with clear certitude: the lore of the ancient hides not this."

In the Middle Ages, Naas became a walled market town and was occasionally raided by the O'Byrne and O'Toole clans from the nearby area which became County Wicklow. To guard against this danger, town walls were built in around 1415. Naas features on the 1598 map by Abraham Ortelius as Nosse.

In 1409, Henry IV granted Naas its first charter as a corporation, consisting of Portreeves, Burgesses and Commonality. In 1413 King Henry authorised the town to collect tolls at all entrances to the town, with the money being used for fortification of town walls and gates.

A mayor and council were selected by local merchants and landowners. Naas became known as the "county town" of County Kildare because of its use as a place for trading, public meetings, local administration including law courts, racecourses and the army's Devoy Barracks (closed 1998). In the Middle Ages, before it settled permanently in Dublin, the Parliament of Ireland occasionally met in Naas, as in 1441. Saint David's Castle, a 13th-century Norman castle, was first built c. 1210, although the present structure is a fortified house of the 18th century.

In 1568, Elizabeth I granted the town a new charter, creating the role of Sovereign of the town. On 3 March 1577, Lord Rory O'More burnt Naas, to avenge his relatives who had been killed by English authorities. Lord Deputy Sir Henry Sidney wrote later the same month:

Rory Oge O'More and Cormock M'Cormock O'Conor have burnt the Naas. They ranne thorough the towne lyke hagges and furies of hell, with flakes of fier fastned on poles ends.

In 1595, Robert Ashe, Sovereign of Naas, says on oath that the charter granted the town by Elizabeth I had been accidentally burned. In 1609, James I granted the town a new charter as well as granting the Sovereign powers to appoint a Serjeant-at-mace to carry the mace before him within the limits of the borough. In 1628, a further charter of James I granted the corporation the right to pass byelaws provided that they are consistent with the laws of the kingdom. The Sovereign of Naas was to be a justice of the peace. In 1671 Charles II of England issued an updated charter. Naas Town Hall was commissioned as a gaol and completed in 1796. As a chartered town, the parliamentary borough of Naas sent two MPs to the Irish House of Commons until its abolition in 1801.

One of the first battles of the rebellion of 1798 took place in Naas on 24 May 1798. During the Battle of Naas, a force of about 1,000 rebels was defeated in an unsuccessful attack on the town.

Naas Corporation was dissolved under the Municipal Corporations (Ireland) Act 1840 and replaced by a Grand Jury until 1854. Naas Urban District Council was established under the Local Government (Ireland) Act 1898, becoming a town council under the Local Government Act 2001. Naas Town Council was abolished in June 2014, when the Local Government Reform Act 2014 dissolved town councils and designated Kildare County Council as the administrative local authority for the entire county.

== Amenities ==
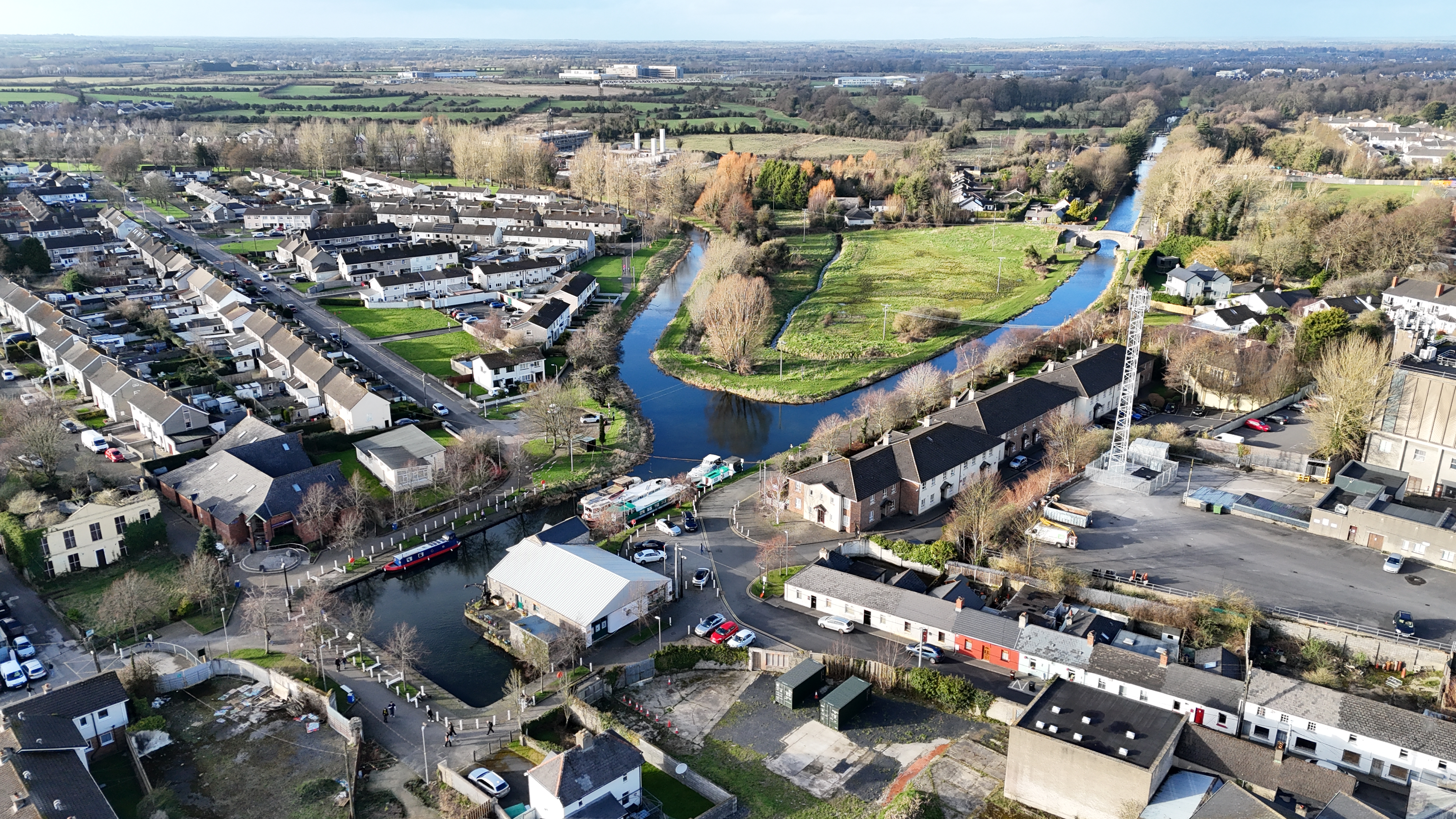
Canal Harbour

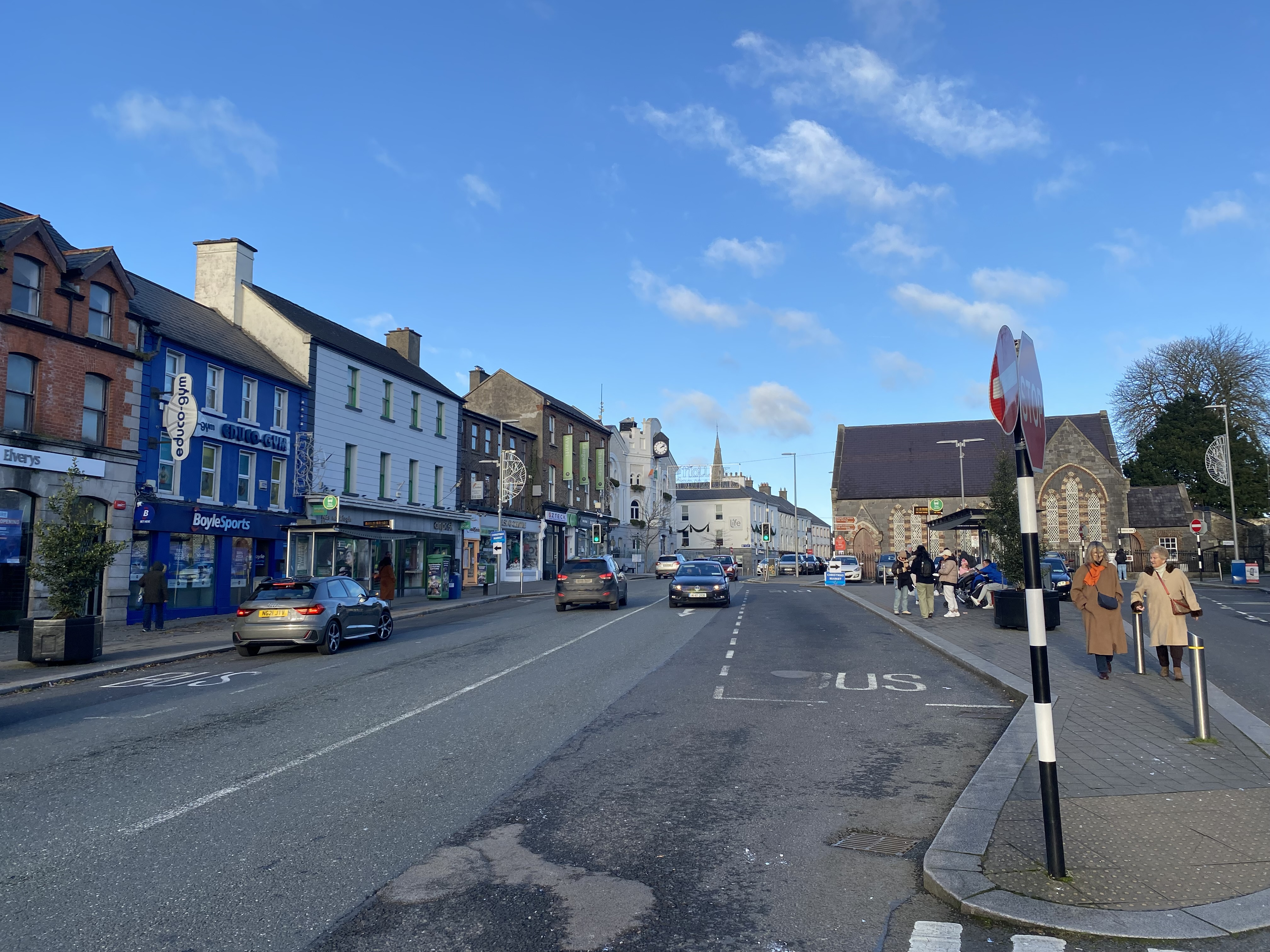
South Main Street

Naas has a hospital Naas General Hospital, Naas Racecourse, Mondello Park International Motor Racing Circuit, a library, the 200-seat Moat Theatre, five-screen 3D Odeon cinema, RSA driving test centre, a tax office, a district court, local authority offices, five supermarkets, several pubs, and a number of schools, hotels and nightclubs.

== Economy ==
Local industrial enterprises include Kerry Group's Global Technology and Innovation Centre, and International Fund Services (a State Street company).

The town centre of Naas includes shops, restaurants, nightclubs, boutiques and shops. Other retail outlets have been developed in new retail parks and shopping centres on the outskirts of the town.

A shopping centre on Monread Road was completed in 2010. Danish home retail group JYSK, a competitor to Sweden's IKEA, opened its first Irish store at Newhall Retail Park in April 2019.

As of August 2019 a new Dunnes Stores food hall opened Aldi has a distribution centre in Jigginstown, Naas. Several smaller foodstores are scattered around the town.

== Religion ==
The town has two Roman Catholic churches, one Church of Ireland church, and one Presbyterian church. The original parish church, St David's Church, is a Church of Ireland church. The Roman Catholic parish church, the Church of Our Lady and St. David, dates from 1827. The Augustinian Friary was founded in the late 14th century. In 1997, the second Catholic Church opened in Ballycane on the east side of town and is dedicated to the Irish Martyrs. Naas is part of the Diocese of Kildare and Leighlin which is run by Bishop Denis Nulty since August 4, 2013. Naas Presbyterian Church was built in the Victorian period on the site of the old tholsel. Maudlin's Cemetery, a Church of Ireland graveyard near the town, is noted for its two Victorian-era pyramids.

== Media ==
County Kildare's local radio station Kfm 97.3FM – 97.6FM is based in Naas. The Leinster Leader, a regional newspaper, and Kildare TV, a local station, are also based in the area.

== Transport ==
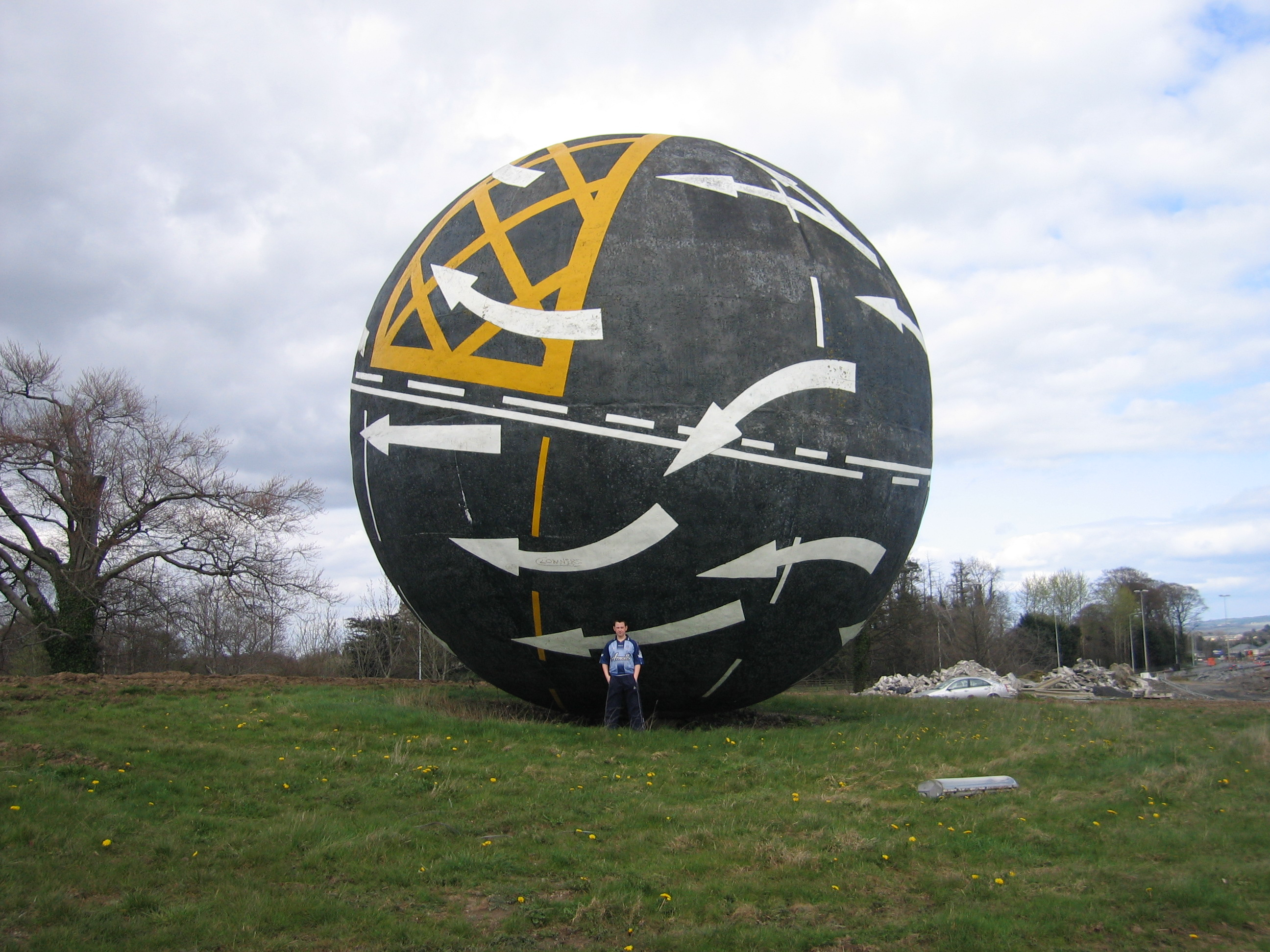
"Perpetual Motion", located at the north end of the Naas bypass, created by Rachel Joynt and Remco de Fouw in 1995.

The nearby N7 Naas Road connects Naas with Dublin and the M50 motorway (Ireland). Additionally, the M7 Motorway connects Naas with the South and South West.

Naas railway station, which opened on 22 June 1855, closed for passenger traffic on 27 January 1947 to be re-purposed for goods trains. It reopened on 10 March 1947 but was closed 12 years later on 1 April 1959. The Sallins and Naas railway station, located in nearby Sallins, is used by residents of the Naas area who commute to Dublin.

The main bus transportation companies serving the area are Go-Ahead Ireland, JJ Kavanagh and Sons and Dublin Coach. Naas's main bus routes include the Go-Ahead Ireland route 126 from Kildare to Dublin city centre (which passes through Naas), a JJ Kavanagh route to Blanchardstown, and Dublin Coach and JJ Kavanagh services to Dublin Airport.

The N7 Naas Road was upgraded in 2006 to a six-lane carriageway with grade-separated interchanges. As of April 2021, Junction 9a of the M7, a new junction for Clane, Millennium Park, and the Sallins Bypass, has been completed and is now open for public use.

- M7 Motorway – Connects Naas with Limerick, as well as Cork (via M8) and Waterford (via M9)
- N7 (R448 N From Monread Boulevard to Maudlins Interchange) – Connects Naas with Dublin.
- R410 – Connects Naas with Blessington
- R411 – Connects Naas with Ballymore Eustace
- R448 – Connects Naas with Kilcullen
- R445 – Connects Naas with Newbridge
- R409 – Connects Naas with Caragh
- R407 – Connects Naas with Sallins, Maynooth, Clane and Celbridge.
- (South Outer Ring) – Connects Limerick Road at Primrose (West Naas) with Blessington Road at Mountain View (East Naas)
- (Millennium Blvd Ring Road) – Connects Limerick Road at Newhall Interchange M7 with Monread Road at Millennium Roundabout

== Education ==
Naas has five secondary schools, St. Mary's College Naas, a girls' convent school, Meanscoil Iognáid Rís Nás na Riogh (Naas CBS) for boys, Piper's Hill College (formerly St. Patrick's Community College), Naas Community College and Gaelcholáiste Chill Dara, a mixed Irish speaking Secondary School. Naas has several primary schools, including the Convent of Mercy (a girls' school), St. Corban's Boys National School (a school for boys), Scoil Bhríde, Ballycane, and St. David's (each mixed schools), Gaelsoil Nás na Ríogh (located at the Piper's Hill campus), Killashee National School and Naas Community National School is located at Craddockstown.

Naas has a public library which reopened in 2024 in the town centre.

== Climate ==
Naas has an oceanic climate (Köppen: Cfb).

Climate data for Naas
Month	Jan	Feb	Mar	Apr	May	Jun	Jul	Aug	Sep	Oct	Nov	Dec	Year
Mean daily maximum °C (°F)	7.6 (45.7)	8.3 (46.9)	10.0 (50.0)	12.3 (54.1)	15.2 (59.4)	17.8 (64.0)	19.1 (66.4)	18.6 (65.5)	16.8 (62.2)	13.5 (56.3)	9.9 (49.8)	8.0 (46.4)	13.1 (55.6)
Daily mean °C (°F)	5.2 (41.4)	5.6 (42.1)	6.6 (43.9)	8.6 (47.5)	11.5 (52.7)	14.2 (57.6)	15.6 (60.1)	15.2 (59.4)	13.4 (56.1)	10.5 (50.9)	7.3 (45.1)	5.6 (42.1)	9.9 (49.9)
Mean daily minimum °C (°F)	2.7 (36.9)	2.9 (37.2)	3.4 (38.1)	4.9 (40.8)	7.6 (45.7)	10.4 (50.7)	12.1 (53.8)	11.8 (53.2)	10.1 (50.2)	7.6 (45.7)	4.7 (40.5)	3.2 (37.8)	6.8 (44.2)
Average precipitation mm (inches)	66.4 (2.61)	62.3 (2.45)	61.9 (2.44)	61.8 (2.43)	76.7 (3.02)	72.0 (2.83)	80.4 (3.17)	77.6 (3.06)	68.5 (2.70)	83.9 (3.30)	81.8 (3.22)	77.1 (3.04)	870.4 (34.27)
Source: Weather.Directory

== Sport and leisure ==
The Moat Theatre is a 200-seat performance and visual arts centre in Naas, which hosts local and national stage productions, live music and other events.

The local Gaelic Athletic Association club is Naas GAA, which has won several senior county football and hurling championships.

Local association football (soccer) clubs include Naas AFC Soccer Club, Redwood Naas FC, Monread FC Soccer Club, and Naas United FC Soccer Club, several of which play in the Kildare and District Football League.

Other sports clubs include Naas Rugby Club, Naas Hockey Club, Naas Cycling Club, Naas Panthers Gymnastics Academy, Naas Lawn Tennis Club (with 11 courts) and Naas Athletic Club on the Caragh Road.

Naas Golf Club, one of three local golf clubs, is actually located in Sallins.

There are several equestrian facilities in the area, with Naas Racecourse (about 1 km (0.62 mi) from the town centre), and Punchestown Racecourse (just to the south-west of the town at Eadestown). Osborne Stables is also based at Craddockstown, Naas. The annual Punchestown Race Festival is a major event for a full week in April. The Oxegen music festival was held at Punchestown during the summer for a number of years but has not been rescheduled since it was cancelled in 2014.

There are also several swimming pools and leisure centres in the area.

== Notable people ==
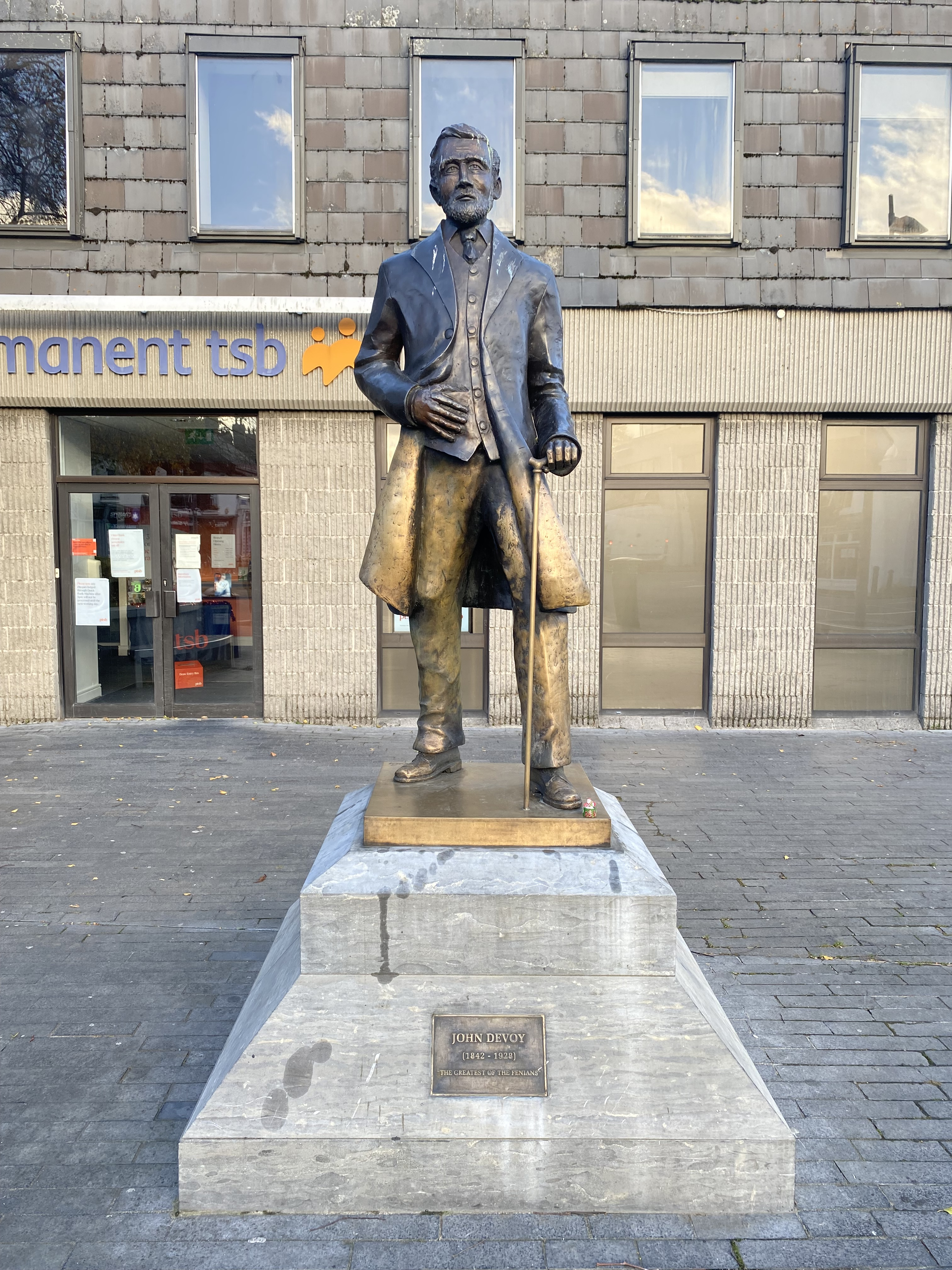
Statue of John Devoy at Naas

- Joseph Bourke (c.1740–1794), 3rd Earl of Mayo
- Hubert de Burgh (1879–1960), cricketer
- Thomas Burgh (1670–1730), architect and Member of Parliament for Naas
- Mother Teresa Ellen Dease (1820–1889), foundress of the Institute of the Blessed Virgin Mary (Loretto Sisters) in North America (at Toronto)
- Charlie Donnelly (b.1983), racing driver
- Marian Finucane (1950–2020), radio presenter and television host, lived in Naas
- Jamie Heaslip (b.1983), rugby union player, Ireland, Naas and Leinster
- John Lyons (1824–1867), a Victoria Cross recipient, was originally from Carlow and died at Naas in 1867
- Jenny McCudden, journalist and television producer
- Major Leonard Greenham Star Molloy (1861–1937), Harley Street doctor and politician
- Desmond Morris (1928–2026), zoologist
- Gormflaith ingen Murchada (c.960–1030), third wife of Brian Ború
- Geordan Murphy (b.1978), rugby union player, Ireland and Leicester Tigers
- Sir John de Robeck (1862–1928), Admiral of the Fleet, Royal Navy, 1925–1928
- Michael Roe (b.1955), racing driver
- James Roe Jr. (born 1998), racing driver
- Andrew Strong (b.1973), singer and actor, famous for his role in The Commitments, was brought up in Naas
- Larry Tompkins, (b.1963), Gaelic football manager

== Twinning ==
Naas is twinned with the following places:

- Allaire, Brittany, France
- Casalattico, Lazio region, Italy
- Dillingen an der Donau, Bavaria, Germany
- Omaha, Nebraska, United States
- St David's, Pembrokeshire, Wales, United Kingdom

== See also ==
- List of abbeys and priories in Ireland (County Kildare)
- List of towns and villages in Ireland
- Earl of Mayo
