= Kilcullen (barony) =

Kilcullen Cill Chuillinn (Irish)
- Barony
- Interactive map of Kilcullen
- Sovereign state: Ireland
- County: Kildare

Area
  - Total: 34.37 km^{2} (13.27 sq mi)

Kilcullen (Irish: Cill Chuillinn) is a barony in County Kildare, Ireland.

== Etymology ==
Kilcullen derives its name from the villages of Old Kilcullen and Kilcullen Bridge (Irish Cill Chuillinn, "holly church").

== Location ==
Kilcullen barony is found in southeast County Kildare, reaching from Dún Ailinne to the border with County Wicklow.

== History ==
Kilcullen barony was part of the ancient lands of the Ó Cuilen (Cullen) sept. These were part of the ancient lands of the Ua Tuathail (O'Tooles) before the 13th century, retaken in the 14th.

== List of settlements ==
Below is a list of settlements in the Kilcullen barony:

- Kilcullen
