= Cross & Passion College =

Cross & Passion College may refer to:

- Cross & Passion College (Ballycastle), Northern Ireland
- Cross and Passion College (Kilcullen), County Kildare
