= Kilcullen =

Town in County Kildare, Ireland

Kilcullen Irish: Cill Chuilinn
- Town
- Location in Ireland
- Coordinates: 53.13042°N 6.74563°W
- Country: Ireland
- Province: Leinster
- County: County Kildare
- Elevation: 114 m (374 ft)

Population (2022)
  - Total: 3,815
- Time zone: UTC+0 (WET)
  - Summer (DST): UTC-1 (IST (WEST))
- Irish Grid Reference: N839095

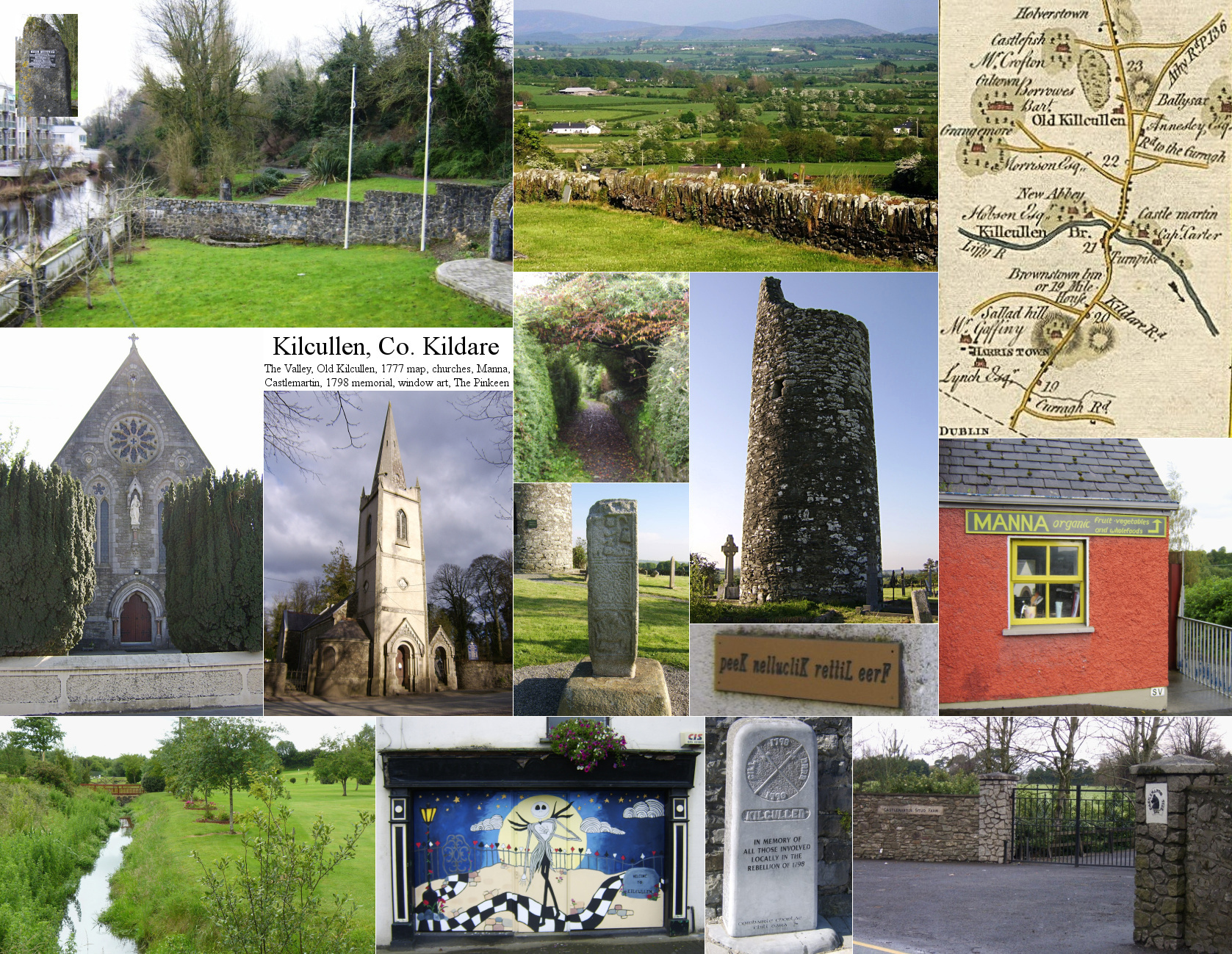
Kilcullen images, inc. 1780s roadmap, The Valley Park and River Liffey, RC and CoI churches, features of and view from Old Kilcullen, gates to Castlemartin, and the Pitch and Putt Club

Kilcullen (Irish: Cill Chuilinn), formally Kilcullen Bridge, is a small town on the River Liffey in County Kildare, Ireland. Its population of 3,815 at the 2022 census made it the 13th largest settlement in County Kildare. From 2002 to 2011, it was one of the fastest-growing towns in the county, doubling its population from 1,483 to 3,473. It is situated primarily in the Barony of Kilcullen (in the Civil Parish of Kilcullen), with a part in the Barony of Naas South (Civil Parish of Carnalway). Subsidiary areas include Logstown, Harristown, Carnalway, Brannockstown, Gilltown, Nicholastown, and Castlemartin.

Kilcullen Bridge replaced the original settlement of Kilcullen, now Old Kilcullen, in the centuries following the building of the great bridge at the future site of the town. Other local historical features include Dun Ailinne, New Abbey and Castlemartin, for many years the home of media magnate Tony O'Reilly and his wife, horse-breeding shipping heiress Chryss Goulandris, and now owned by US billionaire John Malone. In the town's hinterland are a number of stud farms.

== Location and Natural Features ==
Kilcullen is situated off the Dublin to Waterford (M9) motorway, between Naas and Kilkenny, and is centred on the crossroads of the R413 and R448 regional roads (the R448 was part of the main road from Dublin to Carlow, Kilkenny and Waterford until the M9 motorway was opened in 1995, bypassing the town).

Kilcullen straddles the River Liffey and is 40 km (25 mi) from the centre of Dublin, 6 km (4 mi) from the centre of Newbridge, and also close to Kildare town and Naas. There is just one bridge in the town (on the site of the historic bridge which gave rise to the settlement), and none to the northwest for some distance until Athgarvan. However, there are three to the south/east,-in Harristown / Branandockstown, one on a public road, one on a road bridge hidden on the old Harristown estate, and one on a former railway viaduct, also on private land. First built in the 1310s, the six-arch bridge over the Liffey was last reconstructed c. 1850 and renovated and widened in the early 1970s; the upstream face is modern, while viewed from downstream, the historic style is visible.

Upstream of the town the Liffey is joined by what is called locally the Mill Stream, coming from the direction of New Abbey, and forming the last stage of the substantial Kilcullen Stream (flowing north through Yellow Bog), a nationally monitored waterway. At the western edge of the town is the Pinkeen Stream, a minor tributary of the Liffey, which forms one boundary of Castlemartin Estate. At least two small streams lie further downstream in the Castlemartin area.

The town comprises one main street, with a few connecting roads. The main street slopes from Old Kilcullen and the Athy Road and motorway access, after joining with the Newbridge Road, down to the Liffey, and back up again, more steeply. Schools and churches are concentrated at the southwestern edge; businesses spread along the main street and near the old market square; and the town hall, theatre (former cinema), heritage centre, and a bank lie just to the northeast of the bridge.

== History ==
=== (Old) Kilcullen ===
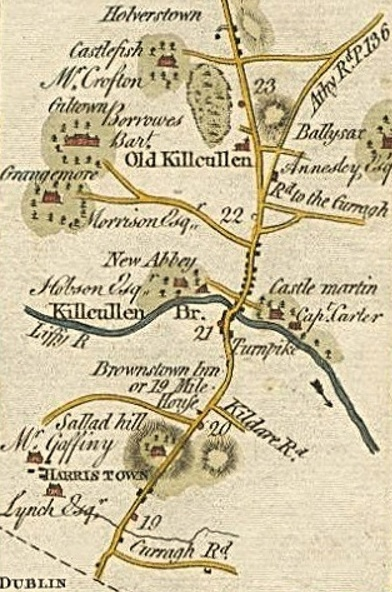
(Old) Kilcullen and Kilcullen Bridge on one of Ireland's first road maps, with Castlemartin and other local features, 1777–1783

The current town and the barony of the same name are named for an earlier settlement, Kilcullen, on a hilltop a few kilometres to the south, now known as Old Kilcullen. Begun as a monastic settlement in the mid-5th century, it reached its peak as an Anglo-Norman walled town with seven gates and seven, or perhaps eight, roads. Little now remains visible beyond a damaged round tower and a churchyard. This town may have been related to the nearby Dun Ailinne, a ceremonial and possibly palatial site associated with the kings of Leinster. However, Dun Ailinne predates any known settlement at Old Kilcullen. Old Kilcullen was raided by Vikings at least twice, in 936 and 944, landing at the site of the modern town.

=== Foundation ===
The current town, officially known, mapped, and recorded in legal documents as Kilcullen Bridge, developed after 1319, when a bridge was constructed here across the River Liffey by a canon, Maurice Jakis, of Kildare Cathedral. It took over, over succeeding centuries, from the previous settlement. Originally, as shown on maps even as late as the late 18th century, the new settlement was wholly on the eastern bank of the Liffey, outside the Barony of Kilcullen.

=== (Fitz)Eustace Family ===
The Eustace family influenced Kilcullen for much of its history, with one of its seats at Castlemartin.

=== 18th to 19th Century ===
The town was in the vicinity of the Battle of Kilcullen in the 1798 Rebellion, and Castlemartin was the base of operations for the British Army in Kildare, under Dundas.

In 1837, the official town area had a population of 699, one principal street of 112 buildings, chiefly on the western bank of the Liffey, a market on Saturdays, and fairs on 2 February, 25 March, 22, 8 June, and 29 September, 2 October, and 8 December. There was a police station and a dispensary, and petty sessions were held. At that time, the population of the rural area of Old Kilcullen still exceeded that of the town by a multiple.

=== Historic Remains ===
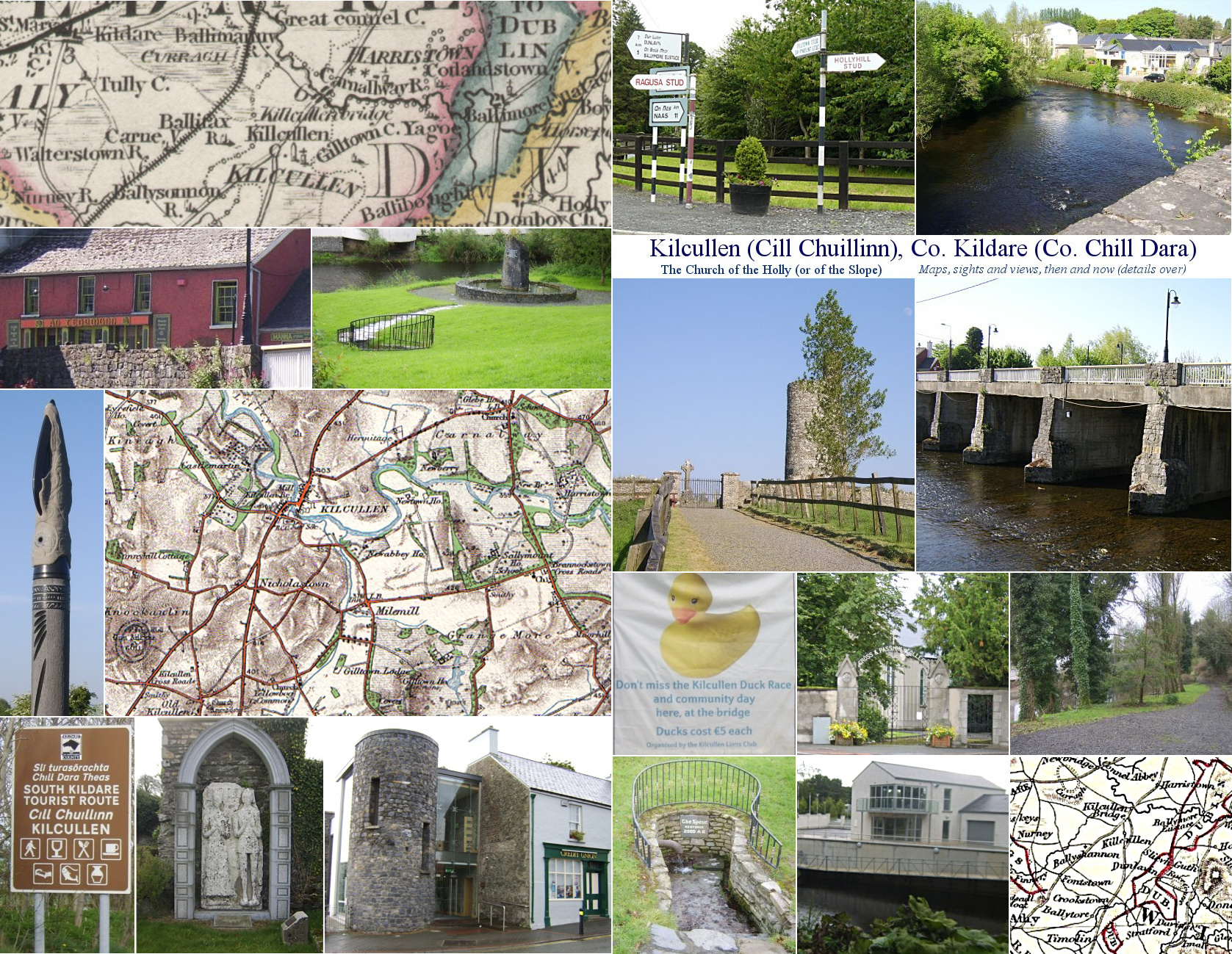
Kilcullen images, including 18th- and 19th-century maps, Liffey, charity cafe and bookshop, round tower at Old Kilcullen, The Bridge, The Spout, Dun Ailinne memorial, Portlester Monument, credit union

On a hill around three kilometres south and east from Kilcullen (Bridge) is the site of the original settlement, now known as Old Kilcullen, featuring an historic church and graveyard, with an extant round tower.

Old Kilcullen may have been related to the reputed site of a palace or ceremonial place of the Kings of Leinster at Dun Ailinne, on an adjacent hill. Local groups have constructed an interpretative site for Dun Ailinne at Nicholastown, about a kilometre from the modern town centre, featuring a sculpture by local sculptor and art teacher Noel Scullion (at Kilcullen's Cross and Passion College). The site was informally launched at the Spring Equinox and formally in summer 2008. In April 2009, it was announced that Dun Ailinne might be part of a bid for World Heritage Site status, along with other royal sites across Ireland.

To the west of the town is Castlemartin Estate, where, to the north-northwest, is situated Castlemartin House. This 18th-century mansion, said to have around thirty rooms, is owned by American billionaire, John Malone. The house is a successor to a series of older dwellings, perhaps dating back to the 13th century. The estate also includes St. Mary's Church ("Castlemartin Chapel"), a dependent chapel of Kilcullen Church, founded c. 1200, ruined for centuries and restored in 1979–1980, and a number of other houses. Two of these, and outlying buildings, opening off the northern part of Main Street, were planned to be redeveloped as apartments, restaurants and shops, with permission granted on 15 February 2008. While the estate itself is largely closed to the public, the new development must be without gates, and it was a condition of restoring the old church that reasonable public access to it also be available.

Kilcullen has an early church of its own, around 1 km (0.62 mi) outside the town, the New Abbey, commenced in 1486 by Rowland FitzEustace, 1st Baron Portlester and Lord Chancellor of Ireland. The abbey's remnants today lie in a church and graveyard and feature some notable tombstones. They can be reached via a Mass path within Valley Community Park, which also passes St. Bridget's Well. Lord Portlester is buried here, as is his daughter, Lady Kildare.

In the Brannockstown / Harristown area, near the five-way crossroads, is Harristown House, originally built in 1740 by Whitmore Davis as the country seat of the La Touche family, gutted by fire in 1891 (while some furniture was saved, most artworks was lost) and rebuilt by James Franklin Fuller in reduced form. The house was sold in 1920, refurnished, and is now open to the public as a tourist attraction. Features include a walled garden and formal walk, the library, French and Italian furniture and 18th-century Chinese wallpaper. Notably, Harristown, although it had no real settlement, was once an electoral borough. Harristown once had its own railway station on the terminated Naas–Sallins–Tullow Branch Line, and a railway bridge over the Liffey, built in 1885. The line has since been lifted, but the bridge remains, out of the way of the roads.

=== Turnpike ===
Kilcullen Bridge and Old Kilcullen were pivotal to the first toll road in Ireland, founded in 1729, and initially running to "the Bridge at Kilcullen" and later to a point west of this, passing the fair green at Old Kilcullen. The road's administration and maintenance were at times questionable, and amending legislation was made at least twice in its history. (Note: Dublin, Ireland, The House of Parliament: 38th Geo 3 c 83, 6 October 1798, "An Act to explain and reduce into one Act the several laws for making improving and repairing the Turnpike Road leading from the city of Dublin to Kilcullen Bridge in the county of Kildare and to the 2ist mile stone westward of the said bridge and...")

=== Birth of Motor Racing ===
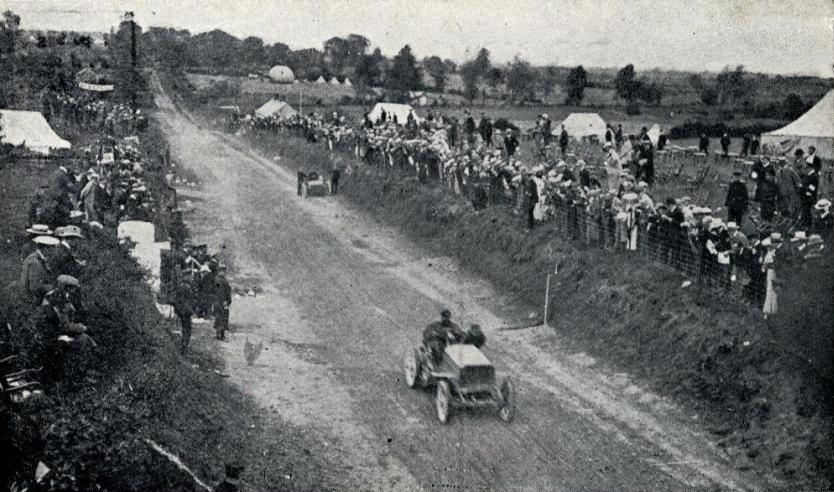
1903 Gordon Bennett Trophy. René de Knyff, driving his Panhard to second place, passes Alexander Winton repairing the Winton Bullet 2 on the first lap

On 2 July 1903, the Gordon Bennett Cup race ran through Kilcullen. It was the first international motor race to be held anywhere in what was then the United Kingdom of Great Britain and Ireland. The Automobile Club of Great Britain and Ireland wanted the race to be hosted in the United Kingdom, and Ireland was proposed as racing was illegal on British public roads. After some lobbying, a number of local laws were changed, and Kildare was chosen as the venue – partly because the straightness of the roads was deemed a safety benefit. As a compliment to Ireland, the British team chose to race in Shamrock green (Note: According to Leinster Leader, Saturday, 11 April 1903 Deprecated link archived 6 January 2017 at archive.today, Britain had to choose a different colour to its usual national colours of red, white and blue, as these had already been taken by Italy, Germany and France respectively. It also stated red as the color for American cars in the 1903 Gordon Bennett Cup.) which thus became known as British racing green. The route consisted of several loops which passed through Kilcullen, Kildare, Monasterevin, Stradbally, Athy, Castledermot, and Carlow. The 328 miles (528 km) race was won by the Belgian racer Camille Jenatzy, driving a Mercedes. Modern signs mark both the route and the old inn that was used as a base.

=== Town Hall and Heritage Group ===
Today, the town hall has historical displays, formed and maintained in cooperation with the active Kilcullen Heritage Group and with the Kildare County Library Service. The town hall displays include photographs, prints, maps and some objects. The Heritage Group holds regular meetings and talks.

== Community and Amenities ==
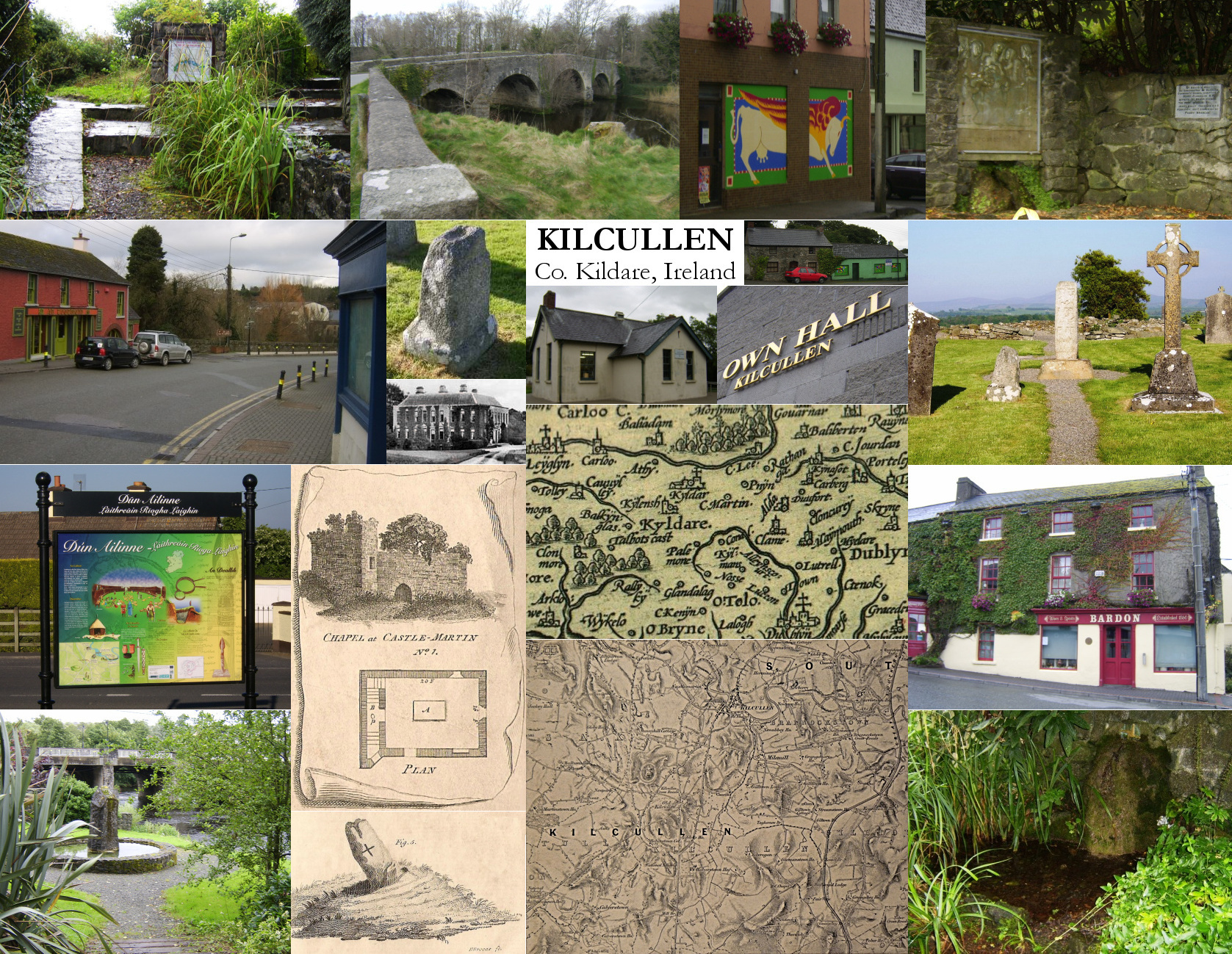
Kilcullen images, inc. the Valley Community Park and St. Brigid's Holy Well there, parts of Main Street, historical maps, the Dun Ailinne interpretative board, an early sketch and floorplan of St. Mary's Church, Castlemartin

A major feature of the town is the narrow but extensive Valley Community Park, which runs along the River Liffey, and related walks, one of which goes all the way to New Abbey. The Valley includes the restored historic main water source for the town, the Spout, and the Holy Well of St. Brigid, ornamented with a sculpture of "St. Brigid feeding the poor", by Fr Henry Flanagan, OP.

There is also the small Riverside Walk behind the Town Hall.

Kilcullen Library, a branch of Kildare County Libraries on New Abbey Road, provides service to the greater Kilcullen area. Located in the former boys' schoolhouse, built in 1925 and operating until 1980, it holds adult, reference and junior sections, some local history information, and a public access internet PC.

=== Civic Groups ===
On a number of occasions from the mid-20th century, community groups have been formed, most notably Kilcullen Community Council, Kilcullen Community Development, and the current formation, Kilcullen Community Action (KCA). These groups have achieved much for the town, including the establishment and preservation of the Valley Community Park under charitable trustees.

Kilcullen has an active Lions Club, meeting regularly and driving and wholly or partly funding a number of community initiatives, such as the Youth Cafe due to open at the Tennis Club building, and the Photographic Competition, designed to capture a record of scenes and personalities, to be kept in the Heritage Centre. One of their major fund-raising events is the Duck Race in the Liffey, which, since 2010, has formed part of a larger community-led River Festival.

There is an active local Scout group, a well-established credit union with a large office near the town bridge, and the Kilcullen Flower and Garden Club.

Kilcullen was among a number of County Kildare places awarded a gold medal in the 2025 Tidy Towns competition.

==== Camphill ====
Kilcullen district is home to two Camphill Communities, one at Dunshane and one in the town itself, which operates the An Tearmann facility, including a coffee shop and Ireland's only Anthroposophical Bookshop, with an organic food shop behind.

=== Education ===
The town and area have a number of primary schools, and one secondary school, the Cross and Passion College. There is also a Steiner method school in nearby Grangebeg, about five miles from Kilcullen, on Dunlavin Road.

=== Media ===
There is a long-running local magazine, The Bridge, published monthly, and the area is also covered with a section in the Kildare Nationalist newspaper. There is also an established online journal, A Kilcullen Diary.

=== Religion ===
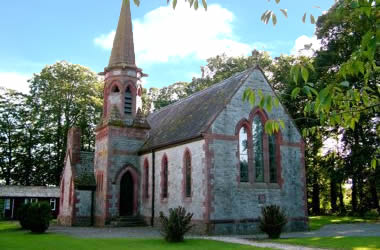
Brannockstown Baptist Church, built in 1882.

Kilcullen is the main element in the Parish of Kilcullen and Gormanstown in the Roman Catholic Church, with two churches managed by the parish of which the parish church, dedicated to the Sacred Heart and St. Brigid, from 1872, lies at the western end of the town proper, while the other, St. Joseph's, is at Yellow Bog. There is also a church on private land, at Castlemartin Estate, St. Mary's Church.

Kilcullen is part of the Union of Newbridge in the Church of Ireland (along with Newbridge town, Athgarvan, and Brannockstown), and has one of that Union's three churches, St. John's.

Kilcullen also has a Baptist church in Brannockstown (near Harristown), Brannockstown Baptist Church. It was founded in 1873 by John La Touche who was influenced by Charles Spurgeon.

== Business ==
The town has more than thirty shops and service outlets, including a petrol station, several convenience stores (one of which includes the local post office), a bookshop, suppliers of farm, hardware & building equipment, and a bank branch. There are small restaurants, several fast food stores, at least three pubs serving food, and a coffee shop (and bookshop) run by the local Camphill Community. On Lower Main Street is Berney Bros. Saddlery, founded in the mid-nineteenth century.

Slightly to the east of the town, in parts of Brownstown and Carnalway, is a private refuse disposal facility, KTK. The owner of the facility made available funding over many years, notably from 2000 to 2006, from a levy on dumping there, to support the work of local groups such as the Tidy Towns Committee. As of late 2008, this facility had begun closure processes, being more or less full.

== Sport ==
Kilcullen GAA is the local Gaelic Athletic Association club, and Kilcullen AFC is the local soccer group. The GAA club adjoins the Kilcullen Community Centre Sports Complex, near the entrance to Castlemartin Estate, and includes an all-weather pitch and an 18-hole pitch-and-putt club (St. Brigids). On the opposite side of the town, opposite Hillcrest housing estate, is Kilcullen Tennis Club, in Logstown.

There is also a successful badminton club in the area, which has both junior and senior members competing in inter-county tournaments and competitions such as the Westside and the county championships. It has a fierce rivalry with Naas badminton club, which it competes against.

There is a 4.1 km (3 mi) Sli na Slainte healthy walking route around the area, passing the graveyard, St. Bridget's Well, the bridge and Bishop Rogan's Park.

=== Horse Breeding ===
Kilcullen is about 6 km (3.7 mi) from the Curragh, the centre of Ireland's horse racing industry and is home to the Aga Khan's horse breeding operation, the Gilltown Stud, and to stud and cattle breeding operations belonging to Tony O'Reilly and his wife. Horse riding is available, and horses can be stabled locally.

=== River Activities ===
The area historically enjoyed a number of swimming locales in the Liffey (one at Carnalway, one in The Valley and one opposite Castlemartin House) and walking routes along its banks (at least one of which is a right-of-way). Still, access has become more difficult in recent years. A bitter dispute over riverbank access took place at Carnalway from 2005 to 2007, featuring unauthorised construction of fencing and obstruction of rights of way.

The Liffey at Kilcullen is known for trout angling, and the North Kildare TSAA manages fishing rights from Harristown through to the town centre.

Kilcullen is also home to the oldest canoe club in the country. Established in 1957 by Paddy Maloney, it has been the home of Olympic and international kayak athletes. Kilcullen Canoe Club are the current holders of the Irish Marathon Canoeing Cup (aka the Riba De Sella Cup), as well as the Irish Junior Series Cup. On 27 July 2008, the club opened its new clubhouse, just over half a century after it was founded. It is dedicated to the memory of Pat Dunlea, who played a major role in the building and financing of the facility. It lies just upstream of The Bridge and actively encourages locals to get involved.

== Government and Representation ==
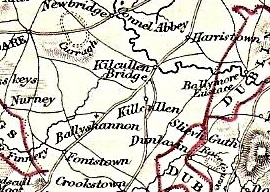
(Old) Kilcullen and Kilcullen Bridge, with the Curragh, in context in County Kildare, 1838, with exclaves of County Dublin to the east and of County Offaly to the west

Kilcullen is within the remit of Kildare County Council; it does not elect councillors for itself or its broader area, but parts of the town and surrounds fall within the Naas Local Electoral Area and parts within the Athy Local Electoral Area.

For national elections, Kilcullen is today in the Kildare South Dáil constituency. It was controversial, for a period, in a Wicklow constituency.

=== Local Government Services ===
The council operates a covered reservoir almost a kilometre north of the bridge, with outlying areas served by group water schemes (many originally arranged by Kilcullen Community Council). There is a small sewage plant by the river, a few hundred metres north of the bridge, and increased capacity is to be provided at a new plant in 2008 or 2009. There is also a large county council reservoir near Old Kilcullen.

Following protests in 2007–2008, the County Council began providing a limited street-cleaning service in mid-2008.

== Notable residents ==
- Abraham Boulger, Victoria Cross recipient
- Hazel Gaynor, English author
- Teresa Lambe, Irish scientist and co-developers of Oxford–AstraZeneca COVID-19 vaccine

== See also ==
- List of abbeys and priories in Ireland (County Kildare)
- List of towns and villages in Ireland
