= Teresa Lambe =

Vaccinologist

Teresa Lambe OBE MRIA
- Education: University College Dublin
- Scientific career
- Workplaces: University of Oxford
- Doctoral advisor: Finian Martin
- Website: https://www.jenner.ac.uk/team/teresa-lambe

Teresa "Tess" Lambe OBE is an Irish scientist working at Oxford University's Oxford Vaccine Group. She is one of the co-developers of the Oxford–AstraZeneca COVID-19 vaccine against the new coronavirus causing COVID-19.

== Early life and education ==
Teresa Lambe is from Nicholastown, in Kilcullen, County Kildare, where she attended Cross and Passion College. Lambe studied pharmacology and molecular genetics at University College Dublin, where she completed her PhD in 2002 with Prof Finian Martin.

== Career ==
Lambe is a scientist working at Oxford University's Jenner Institute. She is one of the co-developers of the Oxford vaccine against the new coronavirus causing COVID-19.

Previously, she worked on vaccines for Crimean Congo hemorrhagic fever, ebola, Lassa fever, MERS, and Nipah virus.

In 2021, she was awarded the UCD Alumni Award in Science 2021.

In 2021, she was appointed an Honorary Officer of the Order of the British Empire (OBE), for services to Science and Public Health.

In 2022, she was announced as one of the recipients of the Presidential Distinguished Service Award for the Irish Abroad for 2022 in the category of Science, Technology & Innovation.

Lambe was elected a Fellow of the Academy of Medical Sciences in 2024.

On St. Brigid's Day, February 1, 2026, at the inaugural Spirit of Kildare Awards, hosted by Kildare County Council at Naas, County Kildare, Ireland, Lambe won the Woman in Leadership Award. In 2026, she was made a member of the Royal Irish Academy.
