= Old Kilcullen =

Townland with religious historical site in County Kildare, Ireland

Old Kilcullen Sean Chill Chuilinn
- Town
- Location in Ireland
- Coordinates: 53°06′25″N 6°45′45″W
- Country: Ireland
- Province: Leinster
- County: County Kildare
- Time zone: UTC+0 (WET)
  - Summer (DST): UTC-1 (IST (WEST))
- Irish Grid Reference: N830071

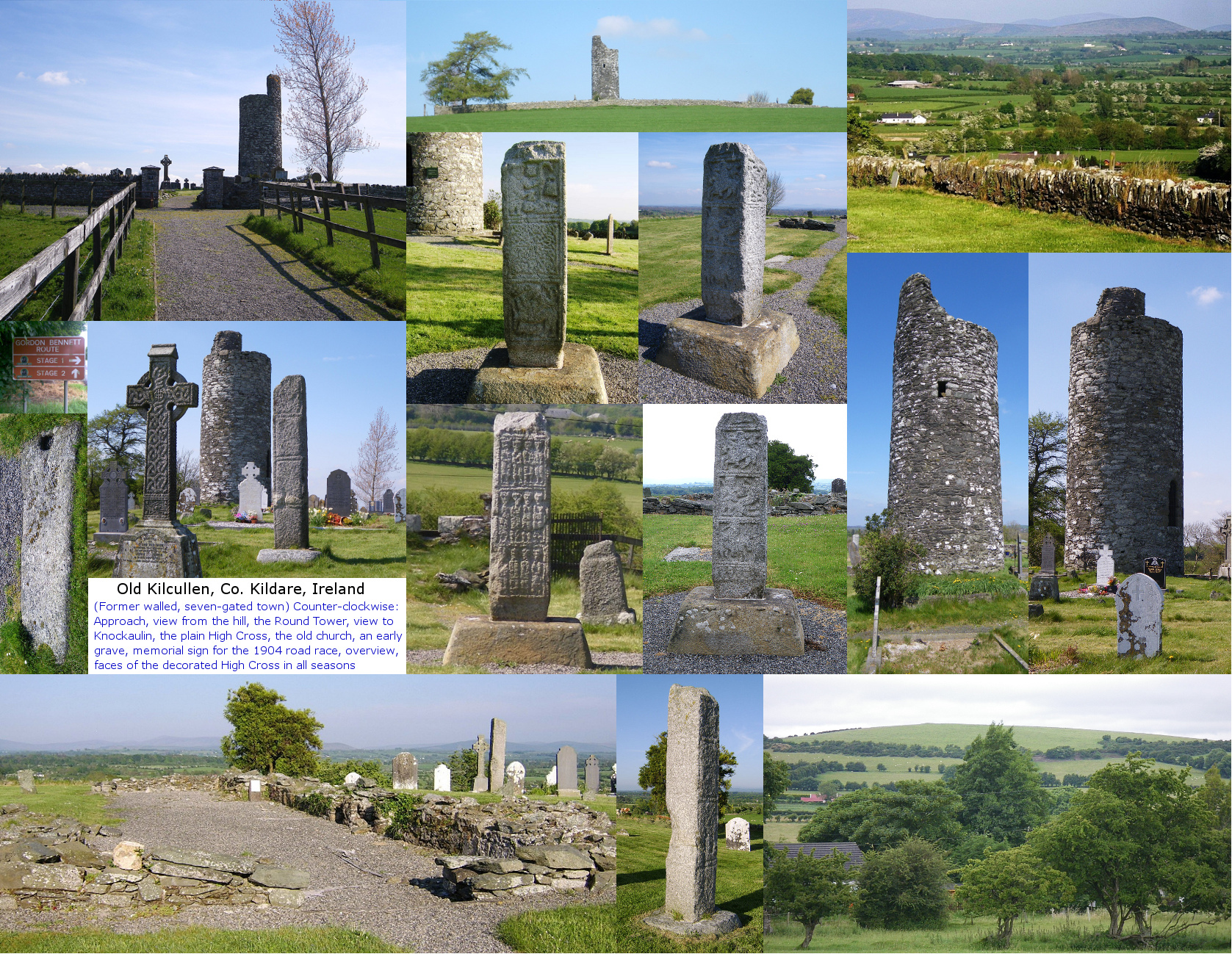
Images of Old Kilcullen in postcard form, including the Round Tower and the "plain" and decorated High Crosses

Old Kilcullen, formerly Kilcullen (Cill Chuilinn, "the Church of the Holly" in Irish), is a townland in County Kildare, Ireland, which includes a noted religious archaeological site within its boundary. As a townland it is relatively large (792 acres) but lightly populated (79 premises). The location of the townland is roughly contained within the R418 and R448 routes starting at its most northerly point, a crossroads known locally as Thompson's Cross https://www.townlands.ie/kildare/kilcullen/kilcullen/kilcullen/oldkilcullen/. The townland continues south from this point as far as Harklow and is intersected in its north east corner by the M9 motorway at Abbeyaun. Old Kilcullen was formerly the site of a walled town, and before that of an ecclesiastical settlement dating from the 5th century. The original settlement gave its name to the substantial surrounding civil parish and barony.

The urban centre of the area moved 2 km north-east to Kilcullen Bridge on the River Liffey, often now simply known as Kilcullen, following the construction of a bridge there in 1319. Old Kilcullen is just under 5 km from Newbridge and approximately 13 km from Naas.

Old Kilcullen is the site of a round tower and a decorated High Cross. Another, much older, historic site, Dun Ailinne, is located approximately one kilometre away to the north at Knockaulin.

== Archaeological site location and access ==
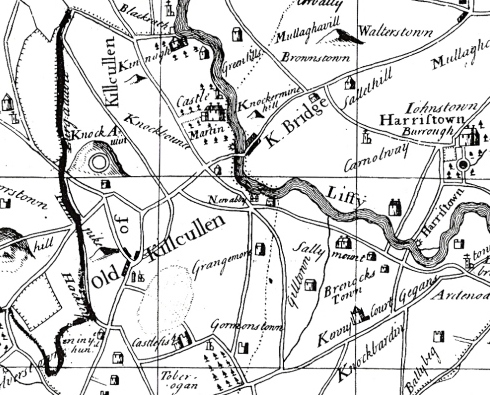
Location of Old Kilcullen and Kilcullen (Bridge), from 1752 map.

The religious archaeological site of Old Kilcullen is situated on a hill around 2 kilometres from Kilcullen Bridge. The site can be reached from a number of minor roads to the north off the R418 (Kilcullen to Athy road) or to the east off the R448 (formerly the N9 Dublin to Waterford road). The R418 and R448 can be accessed from the M9 motorway at exit 2 which is approximately one kilometre from the archaeological site.

At ground level today, the site appears to be confined to a churchyard with surviving stone features at the top of a gently sloping hill, but aerial and ground surveys have shown a far greater extent to the former settlement, including embankments on the slopes of the hill.

The site has no immediate public transport access but Kilcullen Bridge is served by two long-distance bus services, operated by Bus Éireann Teo. and JJ Kavanagh Ltd.

== History ==
Kilcullen began as a monastic settlement, in the period around 448, and is believed to have been assigned clergy by St. Patrick. The choice of location for the settlement was perhaps related to the nearby Dun Ailinne, a ceremonial site related to the kings of Leinster, though Dun Ailinne long predates any known settlement at Old Kilcullen.

The settlement was assigned a bishop, (St.) Iserninus or Isernine, together with (St.) (Eoghan) MacTail or Mactalius, who later took sole responsibility. Whether these two were contemporaries is uncertain, as MacTail's date of death is usually given as 11 June 548, and on the other hand, one source mentions only Mac Tail as founding bishop and one gives his death as occurring in 549

Old Kilcullen was raided by Vikings, landing at the location of the modern town, at least twice, in 936 and 944. In the former raid, it is reported that a thousand prisoners were taken, which suggests that the population at the time was substantial. Other mentions in the Annals include reference to the deaths of key church figures, including Bishops and Abbots (sometimes the one person).

The town reached its peak in early Anglo-Norman times, as a walled town with seven gates and seven, or perhaps eight, roads, and regular markets. There was also some form of castle, which was by the time of Henry VIII held by the (Fitz-)Eustace family, who held for a time the title Baron of Kilcullen.

=== Kilcullen Bridge ===
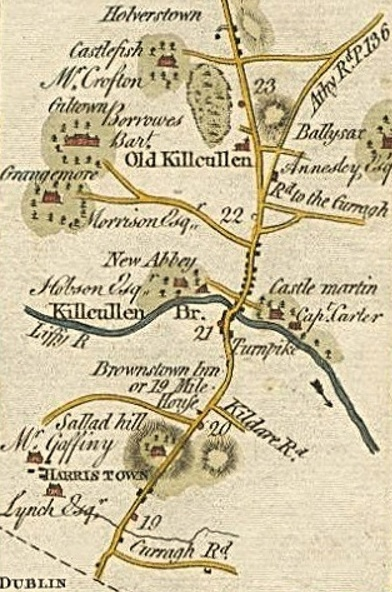
The two Kilcullens on an early Irish roadmap

The new town officially known and mapped as Kilcullen Bridge began to develop after 1319 when a bridge across the River Liffey was constructed at that place by a canon, Maurice Jakis (or Jacquis or Jakes), of Kildare Cathedral. Until the late 19th century, Old Kilcullen townland had a greater population than Kilcullen Bridge. Originally, as shown on maps even as recently as the late 18th century, the new settlement was wholly on the eastern bank of the River Liffey.

=== Later years ===
==== 1641 disturbances ====
The fortification here was initially held by the parliamentary forces in 1641, but later taken by the Royalist army, and then recaptured and burned by the parliamentarians in 1647.

==== 1798 rebellion ====
Old Kilcullen was the site of the Battle of Kilcullen on 27 May 1798, the first phase of which was won by the rebels, before they were driven out, and back to Knockaulin (Dun Ailinne) by General Dundas. During the battle, the round tower was damaged, with, for example, the four windows mentioned in an account of 1782 being reduced to one. It was subsequently stabilised in its current form.

==== 19th century ====
At some point, the settlement, now just a small village, lost the market, whose licence was by then in clerical hands, to Kilcullen Bridge, retaining a small twice-yearly fair. It retained a small church, by then Church of Ireland, until some time in the 19th century (after 1836), and revenue from this went to support two canons of Christchurch Cathedral, Dublin.

Activity was also lost as the main road from Dublin to Carlow (via Athy) diverted away from the hill.

The round tower was taken under State care in the late 19th century.

==== Gordon Bennett Road Race of 1903 ====
One of the earliest international motor races, the Gordon Bennett Road Race, had its third running in Ireland, in 1903, and started in the district of Old Kilcullen, with the Grand Stand at Ballyshannon Crossroads. It was won by a German, followed by a Frenchman.

At this race Old Kilcullen marked the birthplace of what is now known as British Racing Green. Britain had to choose a different colour to its usual national colours, red, white and blue, because those colours had already been taken by Italy, Germany and France respectively. As a mark of respect for their Irish hosts the English Napier cars were painted shamrock green. In keeping with these Irish/Napier roots, many of the earliest greens used on British racing cars were of a lighter olive, moss or emerald green. Later, darker shades became more common.

== Current situation ==
Little now remains visible of the original town site beyond the low-walled churchyard, which contains the damaged round tower, the remnants of a church, two Irish High Crosses, the base of another large cross, and many graves. However, further traces of structures can be seen in aerial photography.

In addition to the historic area, the townland of Old Kilcullen includes homes, farms, a public house, and a Kildare County Council reservoir. A section of the M9 motorway, opened in December 2009, passes through the north east corner of Old Kilcullen.

=== Round Tower ===
The round tower is now just over 10m high at the lowest point of its uneven top remaining course, stabilised after damage during the Battle of Kilcullen. One window, of at least four large windows seen in earlier illustrations and mentioned in descriptions, remains. The round-headed doorway, which is about 1.7m high at maximum, is about 2m above ground level. Beside the door is a plaque declaring the tower's protected status.

=== High Crosses ===
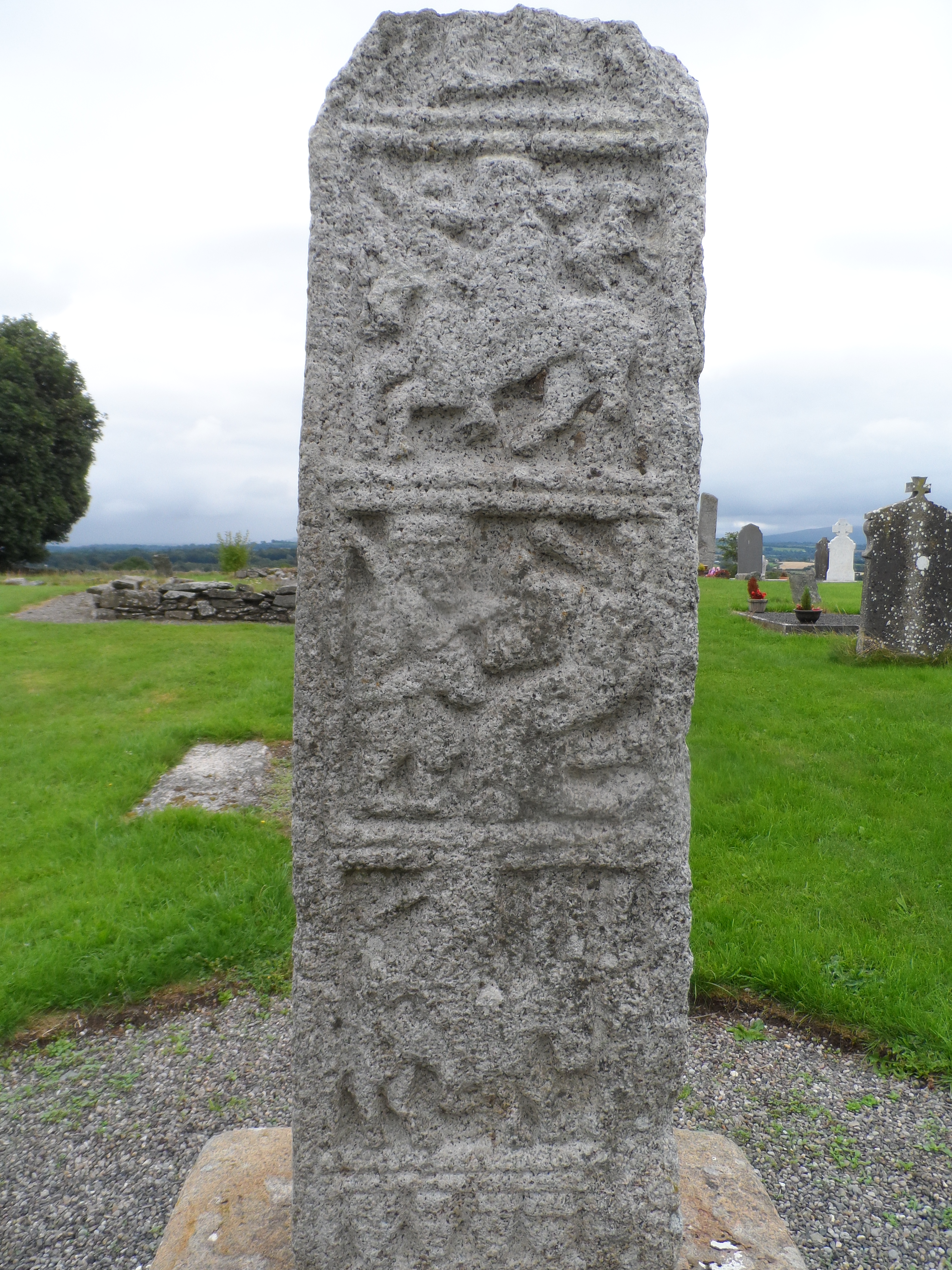
High cross

There are two distinct Irish High Crosses shafts, and what may be the base of a third, at different locations within the churchyard.

The "decorated high cross" has four illustrated faces, with a range of panels showing scenes from the Old Testament. It did not survive intact – it is known that it was leaning by 1862, and later lay on the ground for some years, and when it was remounted in the late 19th century, parts of at least one panel were lost, and parts of the panel which had been facing upwards had been badly eroded.

The "plain high cross" may have had the beginnings of decoration, but has no finished ornamentation.

=== Church ===
The remains of the church now extend only slightly above ground level.

=== Structures formerly present ===
Until at least the late 18th century, one of the reputed "seven gates" remained.

== External sources ==
- Kilcullen(-Bridge), Co. Kildare, Ireland: The Bridge (monthly publication, 1970s to today), various issues, various committee members / editors
- Grose, Francis: Antiquities of Ireland, Vol. 2 (of 2), preface illustration and pp. 27–28 with second illustration (illustrations by Lieut. Daniel Grose)
