= Cross and Passion College (Kilcullen) =

Private secondary school in Kilcullen, Ireland

- Coláiste na Croise agus na Páise

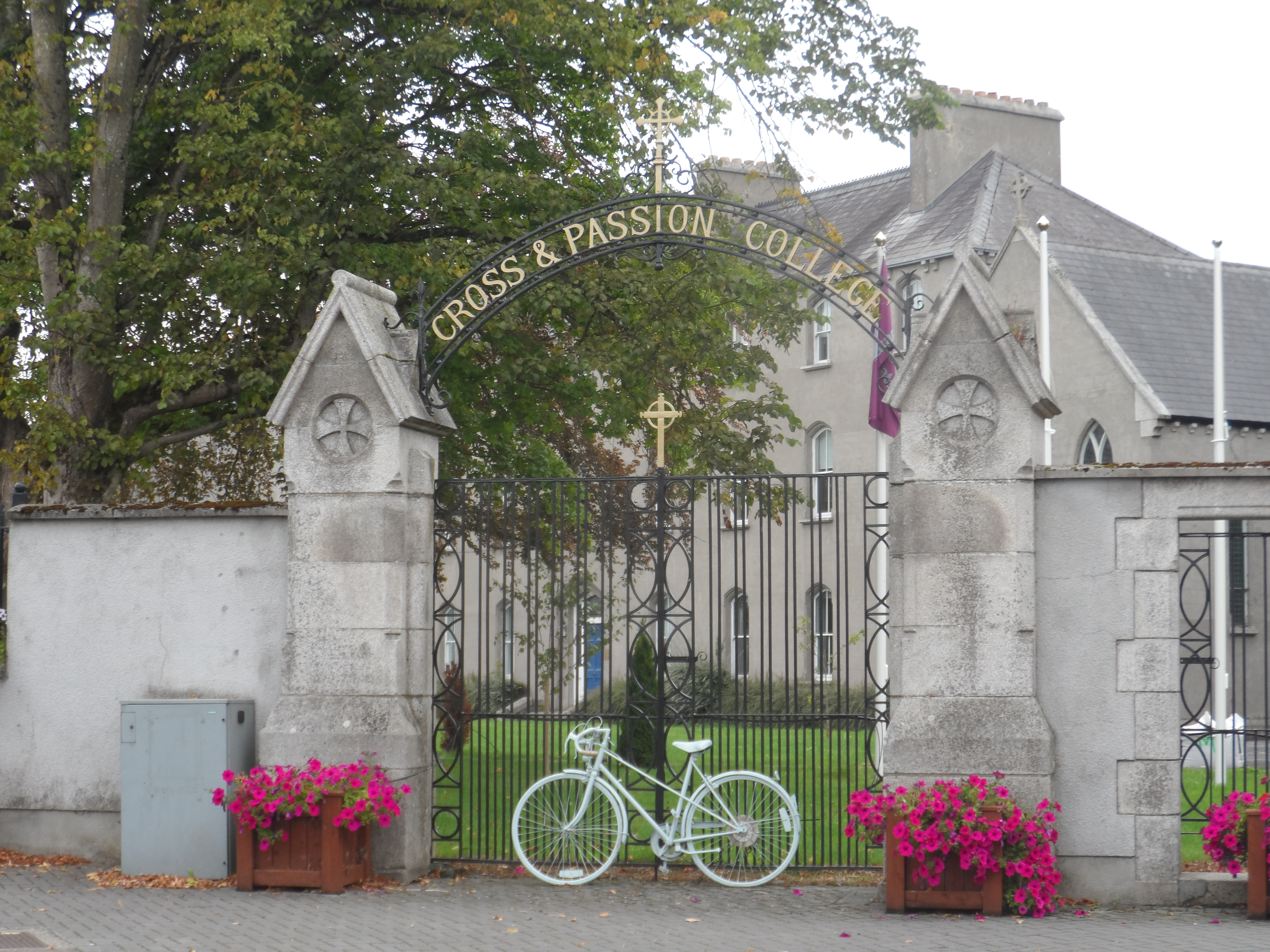

Location
- Main Street, Kilcullen, County Kildare; R56 E673; Ireland; 53.1297°N 6.747385°W

Information
- Motto: Domine noverim te (Lord, let me know you (Latin))
- Denomination: Catholic
- Established: 1886
- Trust: Le Chéile Schools Trust
- Principal: Joe Leonard
- Gender: Mixed
- Enrollment: 816
- Language: English
- Campus size: 5 ha (12 ac)
- Campus type: Urban
- Colors: Blue, black, gold
- Website: cpckilcullen.com

Cross and Passion College is a voluntary Catholic secondary school for students ages 12–19 around the County Kildare village of Kilcullen in Ireland.

It became a secondary school in 1924, originally admitting exclusively female students; however, in 1986 it became a voluntary secondary school and began admitting male students.

== History ==
Canon James Langan of Kilcullen invited the Sisters of the Cross and Passion under the leadership of Mother General Margaret Mary (Elizabeth Prout) to open a convent and schools in his parish in the early 1880s. Local resident Mr Quinn donated land, first for a large house situated on extensive grounds and then, 10 years later, for a new convent, with an interest-free loan for building, if needed for education. The Sisters arrived to Kilcullen on 14 September 1878 and began teaching in the local National School. The convent also served as the novitiate for the Cross and Passion Sisters. The curriculum in the early days consisted of Religion, Irish, English, French, German, Italian and Mathematics. Lessons were also offered in cooking, singing, dancing, decorum, etiquette and elocution.

The school grew in numbers to 68 students in 1922 (48 boarders and 20 day pupils) when the Irish Free State came into existence; application was made to the Department of Education for recognition. The school was among the first in the country to make Irish the common language in instruction; the school’s medium of instruction changed to English in 1942-43. An Army hut was bought for £25 in 1926 and served as a school concert hall and drill hall. On 15 February 1929 electric light from a private generator was turned on, before official electrification came in 1937.

== Free education ==
The Irish Free Education Scheme was established in 1967 and this brought increased numbers of students. Prefabricated classrooms were added in 1971 to provide adequate classroom space. The College moved to a ‘five day week’ at that point with the consequential challenge of the provision of extra-curricular activities. Sr. Joan was appointed Principal in 1977 and the first lay Vice-Principal, Mr. John Kinane was also appointed at that time. Negotiations began about the school becoming a Co-educational Voluntary Secondary School and these culminated in 1986 when Cross and Passion College welcomed its first boys in September of that year, with consequential growth in the student population.

The first lay principal, Mr Paul Tyrrell, was appointed in 1996.

== 21st century ==
In 2004, Sr Máire O'Sullivan, the last teaching Sister in the college, left the school to pursue further study; she was later appointed Provincial Leader of the Cross and Passion Congregation. Sr Carmel Miley continued to serve on the administrative staff of the college, before joining the public service in 2002. Sr Carmel rejoined the staff in 2012, and worked as chaplain and the 'invisible presence' of the Cross and Passion Sisters.

2009 saw the formation of the Le Chéile Schools Trust, bringing together schools of a similar tradition committed to serving and supporting Catholic Post Primary Education.

As of 2024, the principal was Joe Leonard. The school has over 800 students and offers Junior Cycle and a compulsory Transition Year, as well as three Leaving Certs (LCE, LCA and LCVP).

== Alumni ==
- Teresa Lambe - biomedical scientist; one of the co-developers of the Oxford–AstraZeneca COVID-19 vaccine.
- Ryan Sheridan – professional footballer
- Brendan Greene - video game developer
- Dennis Hogan - professional boxer
- Martin Heydon - Office Teachta Dála of Ireland
