= Dún Ailinne =

Archaeological site in County Kildare, Ireland

- Dun Aulin
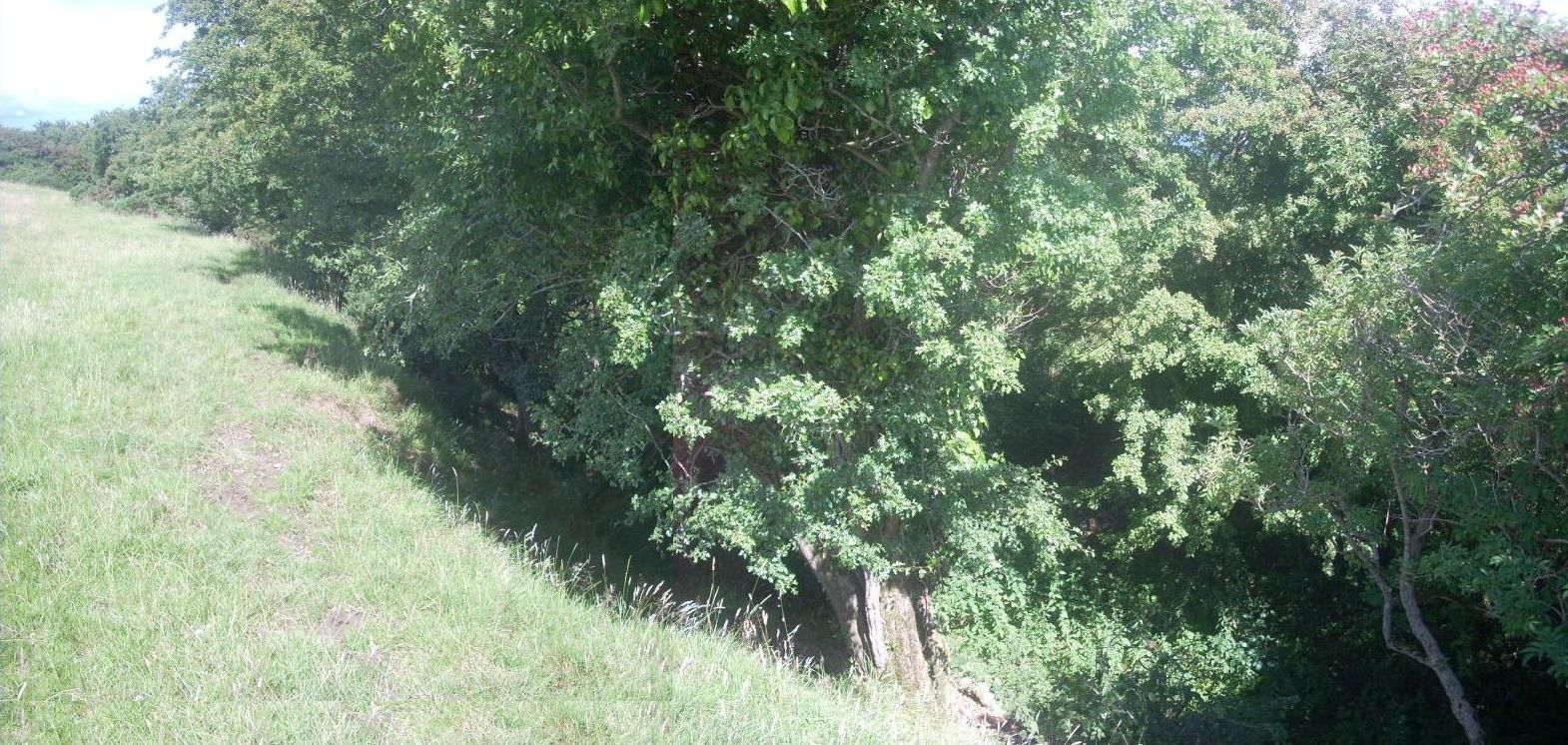
- A view of the ditch

- Location within island of Ireland
- 53°6′54″N 6°46′30″W
- Type: Ancient ceremonial site
- Periods: Iron Age–Middle Ages
- Cultures: Gaelic
- Location: County Kildare, Ireland

Site notes
- Material: Earth, timber
- Height: 183 metres (600 ft)
- Area: 13 hectares (32 acres)

Dún Ailinne (pronounced [ˌd̪ˠuːnˠ ˈalʲən̠ʲə]; sometimes anglicized Dun Aulin) is an ancient ceremonial site on the hill of Cnoc Ailinne (Knockaulin) in County Kildare, Ireland. It is southwest of Kilcullen, near the R418 road to Athy. It is a large circular enclosure covering most of the hilltop; about 13 hectares. While there is no longer anything visible on the ground surface, archeological investigations show that there were once circular timber structures (or rings of upright timbers) inside the enclosure during the Irish Iron Age (ca 400 BCE – 400 CE).

According to Irish mythology, Dún Ailinne was one of the great royal sites of early Gaelic Ireland and was believed in the early medieval period to have been where the Kings of Leinster were inaugurated. These documents were written long after the site was in common use, however, and the site's relationship to early medieval kings remains unclear. It is similar to the other royal sites of Tara (Kings of Meath), Navan Fort (Kings of Ulster) and Rathcroghan (Kings of Connacht).

The site is on private property and is not open to public access. The hill is 183 metres (600 ft) above sea level and so visible from many places in the surrounding area. The best view of the site is from the Old Kilcullen churchyard in Old Kilcullen (where there is also a round tower), which is free and open to the public. Dún Ailinne should not be confused with the Hill of Allen (Cnoc Alúine), which is to the northwest.

== History and purpose ==
The site is circular, about 13 ha (32 ac) in area, ringed by an earth bank and ditch (or "henge"). As with most henges, the ditch is on the inside, meaning that it was likely to have been symbolic rather than defensive. It is believed that Dún Ailinne was a royal centre and inaugural or ceremonial site for the Kings of Leinster. In terms of its ritual use, the internal structures and layout, and its location and association, is similar to the other royal sites of Tara, Navan Fort and Rathcroghan (Johnston 2006). Indications of earliest use are from the Neolithic period, but the main activity there was during the Iron Age. It does not seem to have been dwelt in year-round, but was instead mostly used for short-term activity, including ritual. It seems to have been occupied during the Spring/Summer months and there is evidence of cooking, which include a great deal of bone from cows, sheep, pigs, deer and horses (Crabtree 2007, in Johnston and Wailes 2007). A La Tène style sword and Roman bronze fibulae have also been found at the site (Johnston and Wailes 2007). While it figures in some early historical references, Dún Ailinne was mostly abandoned about the time the nearby early Christian settlement at Old Kilcullen was established in the 6th century.

== Structures ==
Excavations during the 1960s and '70s found that there were once timber structures within the ring. There were three phases of construction, each including rings of upright timber posts. One of these, the Rose phase, had a figure of eight layout, with one large ring, an annexe to the south, and an elaborate funnel-shaped entrance. The later Mauve phase had a stakewall, within which were a timber ring and smaller, closed, circular structure. The last phase was characterized by ceremonial feasting, indicated by a large amount of animal bone (Johnston and Wailes 2007).

== Study ==
Dún Ailinne was the subject of archeological research between 1968 and 1975 by a team from the University of Pennsylvania led by Bernard Wailes. More recently, a geophysical survey of the interior was carried out by a joint American and Irish team (Johnston, Campana, and Crabtree 2009). This revealed a large number of new subsurface features whose character is unclear.

Following some scholarly journal publications, a book was released by an American university publisher in 2007, by Bernard Wailes and Susan Johnston.

In 2008, an interpretative site was opened at Nicholastown, a townland just south of Kilcullen, featuring a bilingual information panel (Irish and English) and a small-scale reproduction of the mound, topped by a sculpture.

== Current status and access ==
The whole site is on private farmland and casual access is restricted due to difficulties with livestock; if there are cattle on the hill then access is not possible. If they are not there, however, you can ask the landowner and you may be given permission to have a stroll around the site.
