= Thomas McCabe (United Irishmen) =

- Born: c. 1739
- Died: 1820; Belfast, Ireland
- Occupations: merchant, abolitionist
- Known for: Defeating a proposal for Middle Passage ships, member of the Society of the United Irishmen
- Notable work: Founding member of the Belfast Charitable Society, Clifton House
- Spouse: Jean Woolsey (m. 1761; died 1790)
- Children: William Putnam McCabe

Thomas McCabe (1739–1820), a merchant in Belfast, was an abolitionist credited with defeating a proposal to commission ships in the town for the Middle Passage. Alongside his son William Putnam McCabe, he was an active member of the Society of the United Irishmen.

== Early life and family ==
Born to a working-class Protestant family in Lurgan in the north-east of County Armagh, McCabe became a watchmaker in North Street in Belfast. He was also involved in cotton manufacture with the Joy and McCracken families. Along with the Joys and the McCrackens, he was also a member of the First Presbyterian Church in Belfast. Similar to other future United Irelanders, such as Henry Haslett and William Tennant, he was a Freemason and a member of Lodge 684. He married Jean Woolsey, daughter of John Woolsey, a merchant of Portadown, and together they had four children. Their third child was William Putnam McCabe, a fellow Freemason, who would also join the United Irishmen, and was important in organising Ulster prior to the 1798 Rebellion. Jean died in 1790.

== Industrialist and abolitionist ==
Thomas was one of the founding members of the Belfast Charitable Society, Clifton House, Belfast in 1774. In the 1770s, McCabe and John McCracken installed machinery in the Clifton House, known then as Belfast Poor House, enabling it to become the first cotton spinning mill in the town. An important member of Belfast's mercantile and industrial middle class, he donated £100 to the building of a new White Linen Hall in 1782, to act as a centre for the bustling linen industry in the city. Another important benefactor to the building of the hall was fellow future United Irishman, Gilbert McIlveen.

Prior to the founding of the United Irishmen, McCabe was heavily involved in Belfast's liberal and radical community, being a leading figure in the city's anti-slavery circle. He clashed routinely with the plans of Waddell Cunningham and others to form a Belfast-based slave trading company of which he wrote, ‘May God eternally damn the soul of the man who subscribes the first guinea’. In 1786, he prevented a slave-owning shipping company from setting up business in Belfast. These exploits led Theobald Wolfe Tone to style him as the 'Irish Slave'.

== The United Irishmen ==
In April 1791, McCabe resolved with Samuel Neilson, John Robb, Alexander Lowry and Henry Joy McCracken:

to form ourselves into an association to unite all Irishmen to pledge ourselves to our country, and by that cordial union maintain the balance of patriotism so essential for the restoration and preservation of our liberty, and the revival of our trade.

In October, the group invited Theobald Wolfe Tone, author of the tract Argument on Behalf of the Catholics of Ireland and his friend Thomas Russell to address a broader meeting. Fully persuaded of Tone's case that London-appointed Irish executive exploited sectarian division to balance “the one party by the other, plunder and laugh at the defeat of both,” McCabe and his friends formed themselves as the Society of United Irishmen. They would oppose "the weight of English influence" by securing an Irish parliament in which "all the people" would have "equal representation".

Anticipating government repression, two days later McCabe joined a secret directory including Neilson, William Tenant, Robert Simms and Henry Haslett. McCabe house and farm (behind the Belfast Poor House) became a regular meeting place for the United Irishmen and was attacked by Dragoons in March 1793.

As the society replicated among working men and women who there had maintained their own democratic ("Jacobin") clubs, and among tenant farmers long organised in secret fraternities, McCabe and others determined upon a republican insurrection for which they hoped to obtain French assistance. McCabe was involved in procuring arms including canon that belonged to the Belfast Volunteer companies. By 1797, having neglected his business affairs and facing financial difficulties he moved back to Lurgan.

== 1798 Rebellion and later life ==
In March 1798, most of the leadership of the Leinster branch of the Society, meeting at the house of Oliver Bond in Dublin, were arrested. This crippled the organisation. Many of its leaders, such as Russell and Thomas Addis Emmet were already in prison, while others like Tone and Arthur O'Connor were in Europe. Meanwhile, Lord Edward Fitzgerald was in hiding, with a government net closing around him.

In May, the rising began in Kildare. It spread to other counties in Leinster before rousing United men in Ulster. The meetings to plan the attack on Antrim were held in McCabe's house. During and after the insurrection, his shop in North St was repeatedly attacked by government troops. His son, William, acted as bodyguard to Lord Edward before his capture, and escaped to France after the revolution.

At the age of 59, Thomas would have been too old to fight. Although still highly involved in the organisation during the insurrection, he appears to have been unmolested by the authorities in the aftermath. His son William later was involved in the uprising of Robert Emmet in 1803.

Thomas is buried in Clifton Street Cemetery along with other United men such as Henry Joy McCracken, William Drennan, William Steel Dickson, the Sinclair brothers.

A Blue Plaque to Thomas and his son, William, was erected by the Ulster History Circle on the wall of St. Malachy's College, Antrim Road, Belfast, which was built on the site of the McCabe home.
