= Belfast Charitable Society =

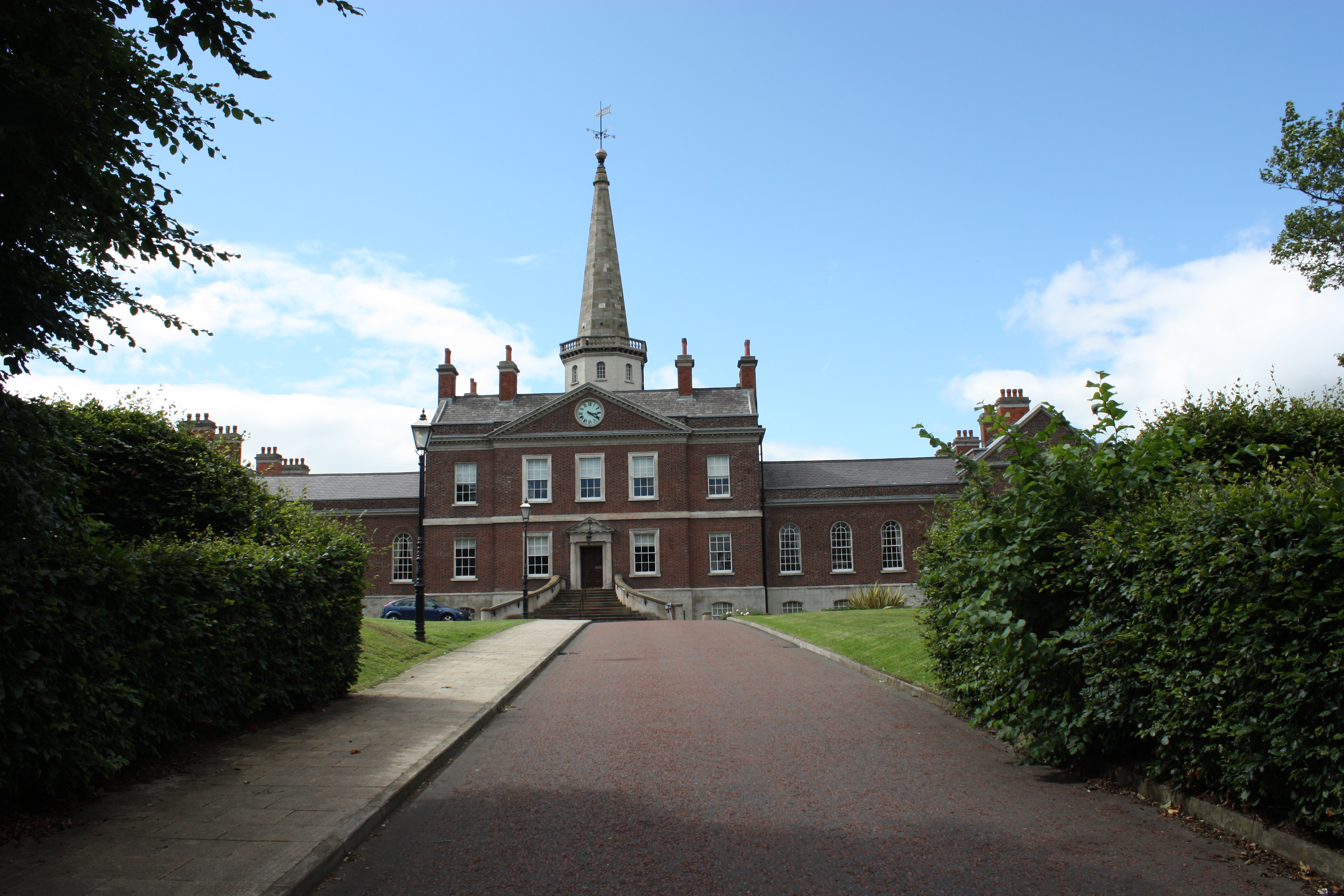
Clifton House, 2010.

The Belfast Charitable Society, founded in 1752, is Belfast's oldest charitable organisation. It continues its philanthropic work from Clifton House which the society opened, originally as the town's poorhouse and infirmary, in 1774.

== History ==
In 1752 a group of Belfast's leading merchants agreed that "a poor-house and hospital are greatly wanted in Belfast for the support of vast numbers of real objects of charity in this parish, for the employment of idle beggars who crowd to it from all parts of the North, and for the reception of infirm and diseased poor". The growth of the town's port and the textile industry had been drawing in poor, often destitute, labourers and their families, from the surrounding districts. The town's burgesses, the exclusive nominees of the Earls (later Marquesses), of Donegall, had made little or no provision to alleviate their frequent and chronic distress.

The society raised money through a lottery scheme and subscription and, following formal recognition by act of Parliament, opened the doors of Clifton House in 1774. Erected on land donated by Arthur Chichester, the first Marquess of Donegall on the northern edge of the town, it combined 36 person poorhouse and 24 bed infirmary.

Although it was not an issue for the society, in 1786 members were divided by the attempt of two of the charity's "founding fathers", Waddell Cunningham and Thomas Greg, to float a Belfast slave-trading company. The partners owned a sugar estate on the island of Dominica, as did the physician to the Poor House, Dr William Haliday. The visit of the celebrated escaped slave and author, Olaudah Equiano in 1791 capped the success of the abolitionist opposition in the town, led by another of the Society's principal subscribers, Thomas McCabe.

That same year, with fellow subscribers and abolitionists, Dr William Drennan, John Campbell White, William Tennant, Robert Simms and Samuel Neilson, McCabe formed the Society of United Irishmen. Proclaiming the union of Protestant, Catholic and Dissenter it sought the overthrow of Ireland's Anglican Ascendancy (represented in Belfast by prerogatives of Lord Donegall) and the establishment in Dublin of a representative government. The resulting association of the Charitable Society with political "subversion", emboldened the government to requisition Clifden House during the 1798 rebellion as a military barracks. Society did not to recover use of the building until 1800.

As a visiting physician to the poor house, in 1782 Drennan had trialled smallpox variolation, the practice of inoculating the skin of healthy people with smallpox to prevent a more serious case of the disease. When in 1800, the Poor House quickly filled again to full capacity, the Society permitted Haliday to conduct trial smallpox vaccination (Edward Jenner's much safer practice of using cowpox) on the Poor House children, provided the consent of parents was obtained.

In 1827, following a visit to Belfast by the social reformer Elizabeth Fry, Mary Ann McCracken (sister to the executed rebel leader, Henry Joy McCracken) formed the Ladies Committee of the Belfast Charitable Society. Thanks to the efforts of the committee, and over objections of more conservative subscribers to the society, a school and nursery were set up for the poorhouse children. McCracken insisted on teachers of high quality and special ability and on play hours in which children would have free use of their time. She and the committee also established a system of industrial apprenticeships.

The exponential growth in Victorian Belfast led to the foundation of other philanthropic bodies who also sought to address disadvantage and by 1882 the last child had left the Poor House. Through the 20th century Clifton House was a residential and nursing home. After the Belfast Charitable Society celebrated its 250th anniversary in 2002, it decided to build a new nursing home at nearby Carlisle Circus. This allowed for a redevelopment of Clifton House. The historic buildings now include a residential home and sheltered accommodation apartments (operated by Radius Housing) and a heritage and conference centre which the Society operates as a social enterprise.

== See also ==
- Irish Poor Laws

== Sources ==
- McCabe, Ciarán (2019). Begging, Charity and Religion in Pre-famine Ireland. Liverpool University Press. ISBN 978-1-78694-157-2. JSTOR j.ctvt6rjk8. OCLC 1101270031.
- Owen, David John (1921). History of Belfast. Belfast: W. & G. Baird. OCLC 1046055401.
- Strain, R. W. M. (May 1953). "The History and Associations of the Belfast Charitable Society". The Ulster Medical Journal. 22 (1): 31–60. ISSN 0041-6193. PMC 2479841. PMID 13078026.
