= John Campbell White (United Irishman) =

Irish activist (1757–1847)

- Born: 1757; Templepatrick, County Antrim, Kingdom of Ireland
- Died: 1847 (aged 89–90); Baltimore, Maryland, United States of America
- Education: University of Glasgow
- Occupation: Physician
- Movement: Society of United Irishmen

John Campbell White (1757–1847) was an executive member of the Society of United Irishmen in 1798 as it prepared in Ireland for insurrection against the British Crown and Protestant-landed Ascendancy. In American exile, he became a leading physician, and prominent anti-Federalist, in the city of Baltimore.

== Ireland 1757–1798 ==
White was born in Templepatrick, County Antrim, where his father Robert (previously of Larne) had been ordained minister of the Presbyterian congregation in 1755. His father was also a schoolmaster. Among his father's pupils were David Manson who, in his own school in Belfast, was to pioneer the use of play in teaching basic literacy, and Rev. William Steel Dickson who later, with the younger White, was to be a United Irishman. After a "useless run of Irish country schools", Dickson credited the Rev. White with teaching him "to think". It is possible with other Presbyterian ministers of his generation the elder White, either at an academy in Dublin or at the University of Glasgow, had studied with "the father of the Scottish Enlightenment", Francis Hutcheson.

In 1778, while working as the apothecary to the Poor House in Belfast, White married Elizabeth Getty (1760–1839). He pursued medical studies at the University of Glasgow (MB 1782), at the University of Edinburgh and at Middlesex Hospital in London. In Belfast he became the attending physician to the Belfast Dispensary, which he had helped to establish in 1792; was an active member of the Belfast Reading Society, serving on its committee; and was a strong campaigner for the establishment of a Free School for poor children.

In the midst of early enthusiasm in Belfast for the revolutionary events in France and the revival of the Irish Volunteer movement, White's fellow Glasgow-trained physician, William Drennan, proposed to his friends "a benevolent conspiracy—a plot for the people", the "Rights of Man and [employing the phrase coined by Hutcheson] the Greatest Happiness of the Greater Number its end—its general end Real Independence to Ireland, and Republicanism its particular purpose." White gathered with Drennan's friends in Belfast in October 1791. Moved by an address from Theobald Wolfe Tone, the Protestant secretary of the Catholic Committee in Dublin, and calling themselves at Tone's suggestion the Society of United Irishmen, they resolved to form "a cordial union among all the people of Ireland" to oppose "the weight of English influence in Ireland" and to secure a "complete and radical reform" of representation in the Irish Parliament. The society rapidly reproduced itself in Dublin and across Ulster and the Irish midlands.

In a first test of this resolve, at a town meeting in January 1792, White helped propose and defend a petition calling for immediate Catholic Emancipation. After hopes for emancipation and of parliamentary reform were dashed first in by the onset of war with the French Republic in 1793 and by the recall of William Fitzwilliam as Lord Lieutenant of Ireland, the society began to prepare for what members hoped would be a French-assisted insurrection. White served in Belfast on the society's northern (Ulster) executive alongside Henry Joy McCracken, William Tenant, Samuel Nielson, and the Simms brothers in seeking to coalesce members in militia companies, masonic lodges, reading societies, Jacobin clubs and Defender cells.

From heavily garrisoned Belfast, White does not appear to have taken to the field in 1798 when rebel forces were defeated north of the town at the Battle of Antrim on 7 June, and to the south at the Battle of Ballynahinch on 12 June. How he and his family made it to the United States is unclear, but by October 1798 they were in Baltimore.

== United States 1798–1847 ==
Baltimore was home to other prominent United Irish exiles, including William Sinclair, Henry Jackson, John Devereux and John Glendy (White's minister in the city's Second Presbyterian Church). White practiced medicine (on the corner of East and Holliday Streets), He was naturalised as a U.S. citizen in 1801 (albeit as "John Campbell", a clerical error corrected in 1839); was an officer of the Medical and Chirurgical Faculty of Maryland in 1802; a founder and first president of the Baltimore Benevolent Hibernian Society in 1803; a founder and trustee of Baltimore College in 1803; and a consulting physician for the Baltimore Hospital in 1812 and 1818. During the War of 1812 he played a leading role in the defence of Baltimore against the British, serving as a member of the ‘committee of supply’ which had at its disposal $20,000 for defensive purposes.

Hailing the United States (in a letter to Robert Simms) as "a young country where civil, religious and political liberty are enjoyed to the fullest extent, and where no more taxes are levied on the Citizens than are barely necessary … to the interests and security of the state", White positioned himself as an anti-Federalist and as a supporter of Thomas Jefferson. It was a politics shared by other Irish immigrants whom the Benevolent Hibernian Society sought to assist. An advertisement placed by the society in a Baltimore paper in 1803 speaks of many of these arriving "in a friendless and forlorn condition, deprived of health and an asylum" but with "a claim upon those who have preceded them". The republican sympathies, both American and Irish, of the Society were made plain in a series of St Patrick’s day toasts following White's re-election a president in 1804: "Our Native Land", ‘Our Adopted Country", "Thomas Jefferson", "Lately Imported Patriots", "United States as Asylum for the Persecuted", "Civil and Religious Liberty to All Mankind", "Our Distressed Brethren in Ireland", and "Fair Daughters of Erin, may they never smile on the enemies of their country". White remained as president of the Society until 1811–12.

In addition to practising as a doctor, White established a successful gin-producing distillery in Baltimore. With his older sons, he extended his business interests to New York where he invested in property including extensive tracts of land.

White died in 1847. An obituary appearing in the Freeman's Journal in Dublin read, in part:

As an ardent philanthropist and sincere patriot, whose aspirations were always directed to the best interests of mankind and the promotion of the freedom of his native land, his name is intimately associated with the political history of Belfast, during the eventful years of the Volunteers, and the subsequent period of excitement. Nearly fifty years ago, Dr White, disgusted with the state of public affairs in Ireland, abandoned his professional prospects here, and emigrated to America, then in the early enjoyment of freedom, where he enjoyed a long career of prosperity and happiness, and with better fortune than many of his compatriots, survived the recognition of Great Britain, of those great measures of civil and religious liberty for which he had, in early life, unsuccessfully contended.

White's grandson, William Pinkney Whyte (1824–1908) was the 35th Governor of Maryland and a United States Senator.
