= William Tennant (United Irishmen) =

Irish revolutionary and banker (1759–1959)

- Born: 26 June 1759; County Antrim, Kingdom of Ireland
- Died: 20 July 1832 (aged 73); Belfast, County Antrim, United Kingdom
- Occupation: Banker
- Known for: Irish Revolutionary
- Political party: United Irishmen

William Tennant (1759–1832), often spelt William Tennent, was an Ulster Presbyterian banker and a leading member in Belfast of the Society of the United Irishmen who, in 1798, sought by insurrection to secure a representative and independent government for Ireland. After a period of imprisonment, he returned to the commercial and civic of Belfast, in 1810 helping to found what is today the Royal Belfast Academical Institution.

== Early life ==
William Tennant was born in 1759 near Ballymoney, County Antrim, in the Kingdom of Ireland, the eldest eight children born to Reverend John Tennant and his wife Ann Patton. Reverend John Tennant was the first Minister of Roseyards Presbyterian Church which was founded in 1751. William's father had been among the first Scottish Anti-Bugher Presbyterian ministers to settle in Ulster. Seceders from the Church of Scotland, they refused to accept a sacramental test (the Burgher Oath), as a condition of public office. It was a position that had radical implications in Ireland where such tests secured the Anglican ("Protestant") Ascendancy their monopoly of position and influence against both Presbyterians ("Dissenters") and the kingdom's dispossessed Roman Catholic majority. Rev. Tennant was an early subscriber to the Northern Star, the newspaper of the Society of United Irishmen.

As a young man, William served as an apprentice with John Campbell, a Belfast merchant and banker. He joined the Belfast Chamber of Commerce in 1783, and was junior manager in the New Sugar House in Waring Street. He eventually became a partner in this business, and he held partnerships in the distilling firm of John Porter & Co. and the Belfast Insurance Co. By the time he reached adulthood, Tennant was a very prosperous businessman.

== The United Irishmen ==
The Society of United Irishmen, originally proposed by Tennant's friend in Dublin, William Drennan, was formed in Belfast by a group of the town's more radical Presbyterian reformers, enthused by the French Revolution and Thomas Paine's vindication of The Rights of Man. They had read Theobald Wolfe Tone's Argument on Behalf of the Catholics of Ireland in which he argued that that division between Catholics and Protestants was being used by English and landed interests to balance "the one party by the other, plunder and laugh at the defeat of both." Tone put forward the case for unity between Catholics, Protestants and Dissenters. In October 1791 they invited Tone and his friend Thomas Russell for what proved to be the Society's inaugural meeting.

Despairing of the prospects for reform, by 1795/6 Tennant was convinced of the case for a revolutionary insurrection against the British Crown and the Ascendancy. He served Society's northern (Ulster) executive alongside Henry Joy McCracken, John Campbell White, Samuel Nielson, Henry Haslett, Samuel McTier and the Simms brothers in seeking to coalesce members in militia companies, masonic lodges, reading societies, Jacobin clubs and Defender cells.

According to Wolfe Tone, Tennant had been a member of a pre-United Irishmen secret society in Belfast which included McTier and Haslett, as well as Samuel Neilson and Gilbert McIlveen. This was the Jacobin Club described by William Drennan's sister Martha McTier in 1795 as an established democratic party in Belfast, composed of "persons and rank long kept down" and chaired by a "radical mechanick".

In April 1795 Earl Fitzwilliam, Lord Lieutenant for just fifty days, was recalled to London for publicly urging support for Catholic Emancipation. With hopes for reform buried, these Jacobins, who had also organised in Dublin and Derry, flooded United Irish societies.

== Arrest and Imprisonment ==
On the eve of the rebellion of 1798, Tennant was arrested and held on a prison ship in Belfast Lough with William Steel Dickson, Robert Hunter and Robert Simms. On 25 March 1799, they were transferred to Fort George in Scotland, where they were joined by Samuel Neilson, Arthur O'Connor, Thomas Russell, William James MacNeven, and Thomas Addis Emmet.

Unlike the more high-profile prisoners like O'Connor and MacNeven who would not be released until June 1802, together with Dickson and Simms, Tennant was permitted to return to Belfast in January 1802

== Later career ==
On his release from Fort George, Tennant retained sufficient capital to quickly re-establish himself in business. By 1807, he was one of the owners and directors of London and Liverpool New Traders, a partnership that commanded 12 ships. In 1809 he helped found the Commercial Bank, in which he worked until, enlarged, it became Belfast Banking Co. in 1827. He was on the Board of the Spring Water Commissioners and the Belfast Banking Company, and was vice-president of the Chamber of Commerce. Tennant eventually became the town's richest merchant and banker.

With William Drennan, Tennant and his brother Dr Robert Tennent were co-founders in 1810 of the Belfast (later Royal Belfast) Academical Institution. Established on progressive principles, its mission was to render "less expensive the means of acquiring education; to give access to the walks of literature to the middle and lower classes of society; [and] to make provision for the instruction of both sexes."

== Later life ==
In 1817, Tennant was appointed treasurer of the First Belfast Presbyterian Church, a "bastion of liberal 'new light' Presbyterianism" of which Drennan's father, Thomas Drennan, had been minister. When Tennant died of cholera in 1832 aged 73, he bequeathed to the Presbyterian Church the village and demesne of Tempo, County Fermanagh which he had purchased in 1814. He left behind at least 13 illegitimate children, all of whom he recognised and supported.
