= Waddell Cunningham =

Irish merchant, politician and military officer (1729–1797)

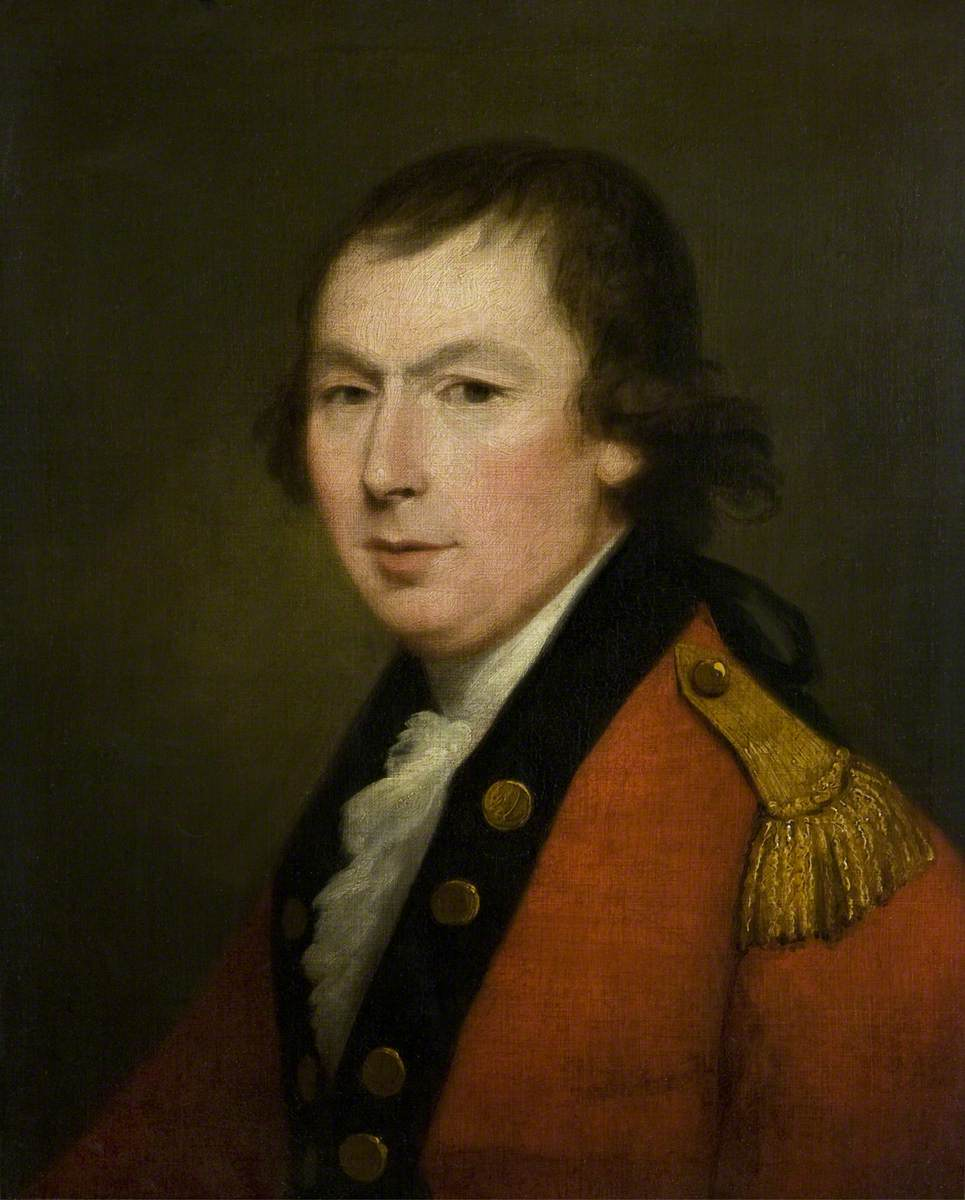
- Portrait by Robert Home, 1784
- Born: c. 1729; Killead, County Antrim
- Died: 15 December 1797 (aged 67–68); Belfast, Ireland
- Occupations: Merchant, politician, military officer
- Political party: Northern Whig Club
- Board member of: Belfast Charitable Society, Belfast Ballast Board, Belfast Chamber of Commerce
- Military career
- Allegiance: Kingdom of Ireland
- Branch: Irish Volunteers
- Rank: Captain
- Unit: Belfast Volunteer Company

Captain Waddell Cunningham (c. 1729 – 15 December 1797) was an Irish trans-Atlantic trader, Dominican slave-holder and local merchant, prominent in the commercial and civic life of Georgian-era Belfast. In a town much agitated by the American struggle for independence he was seen a friend of reform. He was a patron of the Belfast Charitable Society and its Poor House; a commander of the patriot Volunteer militia; and a leading subscriber among Presbyterians to the costs of erecting Belfast's first Catholic chapel. But his commercial interests and opposition to immediate Catholic Emancipation placed him at odds with the more democratic elements of the town and surrounding districts.

In retaliation for rent increases and evictions, in 1771 his house in Belfast was attacked and destroyed by tenant "Steelboys" from his home region north of the town. In 1786 public protest forced him to abandon plans to commission ships in the port for the Atlantic slave trade. In 1792, following Bastille Day celebrations, his attempt to water down a town resolution in favour of political coalition with Ireland's Catholic majority was defeated by fellow Volunteers styling themselves the United Irishmen. As preparations were laid for the 1798 Rebellion, Cunningham was prominent among the town's loyalists in volunteering his services to the local yeomanry.

== New York ship owner and privateer ==
Waddell Cunningham was born in Killead, County Antrim c. 1729, the youngest son of John Cunningham and his wife Jane. Both of Cunningham's parents came from families who were involved in farming and the linen and overseas trades. By 1752, he had started working as a ship-owner who was involved in the triangular trade. His merchant ships carried rough linen clothing and salted provisions from Belfast to the British West Indies, where they were sold to slave plantations; sugar and rum from the West Indies to Baltimore and New York City; and flaxseed from the Thirteen Colonies (where, in contrast to Belfast and its hinterlands, the relative scarcity of labour made it unprofitable to process flax into linen fibre) back to Ireland.

Dealings in New York brought him into contact and partnership with Thomas Greg, another Belfast Presbyterian. Benefitting from the rise in the prices of provisions during the Seven Years’ War (1756–1763) and, although themselves trading illicitly with the French and Spanish, from licence to attack and plunder enemy vessels, Greg & Cunningham became one of New York's largest shipping companies.

After the war, the partners invested some of their new found wealth in acquiring a sugar plantation on Dominica, which they called "Belfast". Greg's brother John, already established on the island, supplied slaves. (On Dominica, their enterprise has lent the name Belfast to an elevated neighbourhood above the coastal village of Mahaut and to the adjacent Belfast River).

== Belfast merchant ==
Facing legal sanctions in New York for his illicit trading, Cunningham returned to Belfast in 1763 where, with Greg, he acted to improve the town's commercial infrastructure. They invested in the Lagan navigation canal (1763), in new docks and quays (Cunningham was the first president of the Belfast Ballast--later Harbour--Board), and in the construction of the White Linen Hall (1785) which, together, attracted the linen trade to Belfast that had formerly gone through Dublin. Cunningham was additionally engaged in sugar-refining, flour-milling, glass manufacturing, new techniques for salting Donegal herring for export, finance ("Cunningham's Bank", 1785), insurance, and tobacco smuggling.

Commensurate with his position as the town's wealthiest merchant, Cunningham assumed broader civic responsibilities. He was a founding member, and principal benefactor, of the Belfast Charitable Society, (1774) which established the "Poor House" (Clifton House) just outside the town. He was also a promoter of the Belfast Academy and the Belfast Society for Promoting Knowledge (the Linen Hall Library).

For many, however, such beneficence was poor compensation for the hardship that Cunningham visited upon his own countrymen, and co-religionists. Townspeople and countryfolk alike decried his eviction of poor tenants from lands in which he and Greg had speculated. In 1771, members of the secret agrarian society, the Hearts of Steel were able to enter the town, burn Cunningham's house, besiege the barracks, and spring one of their number from prison.

== Irish Volunteer and Whig reformer ==
Although secretly engaged in the supply of linen uniforms to the insurgent American colonists, following the raid upon Belfast Lough by the American privateer John Paul Jones in April 1778, Cunningham was among the first to organise his own Volunteer company. Ostensibly formed to defend the Ireland against the Americans and their French allies, the large Presbyterian contingent in the Volunteer movement demonstrated sympathy for their kinfolk in the colonies. Cunningham was a delegate to Volunteer conventions in Dungannon and Dublin which echoed American discontents in calling for legislative independence and freedom from the restrictions of Britain's Navigation Acts. After these were conceded by London, Cunningham (following the example of the "African Company" in Limerick) proposed to commission ships in Belfast for the Middle Passage, previously a preserve of British ports.

The prosperity of Belfast was heavily invested in trade with the West-Indian plantation economy, but for public opinion in the town the actual carriage of human chattel proved a step too far. The outcry was led from within the First Presbyterian Church in Rosemary Lane (to which Cunningham, a congregant of the neighbouring Second Presbyterian Church had made a generous subscription), by his fellow Charitable Society board member, Thomas McCabe. In 1785, plans for a "Belfast Slaveship Company" were abandoned. The victory of the abolitionists was sealed by the popular reception given to Olaudah Equiano who, promoting his memoir of slavery in West Indies, visited Belfast in 1791.

When, in the wake of the French Revolution, calls for reform revived, Cunningham became a member of the Northern Whig Club. The club proposed reforming the system of "pocket boroughs" whereby most members of the Irish House of Commons were nominees of kingdom's largest landowners (already seated in the House of Lords). After the borough proprietor, Lord Donegall, ignored a petition to nominate Cunningham as one of Belfast's two Members of Parliament in the general election of 1783, Cunningham stood on a platform of parliamentary reform in neighbouring Carrickfergus. He was returned by 474 votes to 289. A rare victory for a Presbyterian, the result was overturned by a committee of the House of Commons on the grounds that Belfast Volunteers had exercised undue influence on his behalf.

Cunningham favoured relieving the kingdom's Catholic majority of their civil disabilities under the Penal Laws. In May 1784, his Belfast Volunteer Company opened its rank to Catholics and under Cunningham paraded for the opening for the town's first Catholic chapel, St Mary's, for which they had made "a handsome collection". But on his visit to Belfast in 1791, Wolfe Tone found Cunningham was not among the northern reformers convinced by his Argument on behalf of the Catholics of Ireland—Tone's insistence that a national government for Ireland would never be secured without engaging Catholics on the basis of complete equality.

== Government loyalist ==
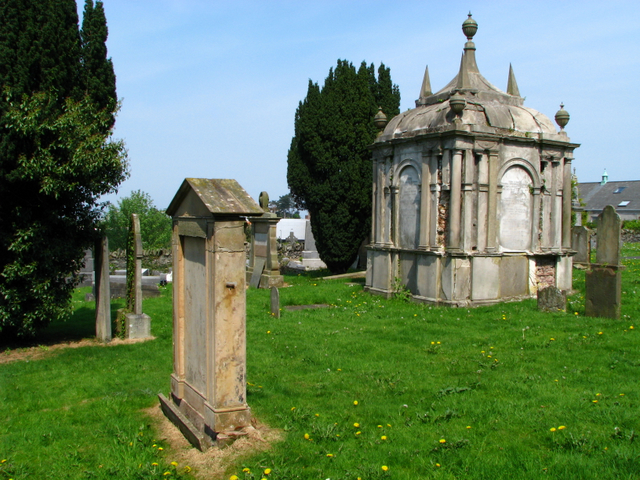
Mausoleum of Waddell Cunningham, Kbockbreda Cemetery, Belfast

On Bastille Day 1792, celebrating what he and his fellow Whig reformers still regarded as a French reprise of England's Glorious Revolution, Cunningham led his Volunteers in a muster and parade in Belfast. He was alarmed, however, by the knowledge the day was to end in a public banquet and meeting at which Tone's supporters, the United Irishmen, would move an Address to the People of Ireland. Samuel Neilson, publisher of the Painite paper, the Northern Star, found Cunningham the previous evening in an inn haranguing Volunteers up from the country against Catholics "and talking of some sedition to be broached next day".

The Address's offending passage proved to be the declaration that "no reform, were even such attainable, would answer our ideas of utility or justice, which should not equally include all sects and denominations of Irishmen". Cunningham, together with his church minister, William Bruce, and the publisher of the Star's rival title, The News Letter, Henry Joy, proposed, rather, "the gradual emancipation of our Roman Catholic brethren". Their caution was swept aside, with Neilson expressing "astonishment at hearing ... any part of the address called a Catholic question." The only question was "whether Irishmen should be free."

As the United Irishmen prepared, under growing martial-law repression, for a republican insurrection, Cunningham declared his loyalty to the Crown and to the government in Dublin, now entrusted to the least compromising representatives of the Anglican Ascendancy. He captained the town's yeomanry corps.

== Death and memorial ==
Cunningham died in December 1797 at his restored house in Hercules Street (now Royal Avenue), seven months before the risings in Antrim and Down. In November 1765 he had married Thomas Greg's sister-in-law Margaret (d. 1808), daughter of a Belfast merchant, Samuel Hyde. They had no children. His name was carried by Cunningham Waddell Greg, the son of his business partner, who, with his sister Jane Greg a committed republican, were in 1798 attacked by loyalists for assisting United Irish prisoners.

Cunningham was interred under an imposing memorial, attributed to Roger Mulholland, in Knockbreda Church cemetery overlooking Belfast. The inscription reads: "Here are deposited the remains of Waddell Cunningham, Esq. whose integrity as a merchant, generosity as a patron and whose steadiness and hospitality as a friend will long be the objects of the most respectful and grateful rememberance. He died the 15th of December 1797 aged 68 years".
