= Robert Tennent (physician) =

Irish physician, merchant and philanthropist

Robert Tennent (Tennant)
- Robert Tennent, MD, RN, circa 1815
- Born: 1765; Ballymoney, County Antrim, Kingdom of Ireland
- Died: 1837 (aged 71–72); Belfast, County Antrim, United Kingdom of Great Britain and Ireland
- Occupations: Physician; ship's surgeon; merchant; philanthropist
- Movement: Friends of Civil and Religious Liberty

Robert Tennent (sometimes spelled Tennant) (1765–1837) was an Irish physician, merchant and philanthropist in Belfast. Representative of a politically radical Presbyterian current in Ireland, in the years following the Acts of Union he was renowned for his confrontations with the local Tory establishment. Among the numerous civic initiatives with which he was associated, the most lasting proved to be Royal Belfast Academical Institution and what is today the Royal Victoria Hospital, Belfast.

== Biography ==
=== 'Old Light' religion, radical politics ===
Tennent was born 9 August 1765 in Ballymoney, County Antrim, the son of the Reverend John Tennent and Ann Patton and brother to Isabella (Tennent) Shaw, William Tennent, Anna Tennent, Margaret Tennent, John Tennent, James Tennent and Samuel Tennent. The Rev John Tennent had been one of the first Scottish Anti-Bugher Presbyterian ministers to settle in Ulster. Seceders from the established Church of Scotland, they had refused to accept a sacramental test (the Burgher Oath), affirming the religion "presently professed in this kingdom", as a condition of public office. In Ireland, where such tests secured the Anglican ("Protestant") Ascendancy their monopoly of position and influence against both Presbyterians ("Dissenters") and the kingdom's dispossessed Roman Catholic majority, such defiance had potentially radical implications.

Rev. Tennent was an early subscriber to the Northern Star, the paper of Belfast's first United Irishmen, Presbyterians frequently of a New Light latitudinarian persuasion. Robert (active in the Hibernian Bible Society) was to maintain his father's Old Light theological views, while championing the Star's patriotic and reform agenda.

During the 1790s, a decade in which the French Revolution contributed to the democratic agitation and, ultimately, insurrectionary designs of the United Irishmen, he was overseas. After medical training had gone to the West Indies (with which Belfast maintained an extensive trade) and worked as an agent for several properties in Jamaica. In 1793, he joined the Royal Navy as a surgeon. In that capacity he was, by his own account, a sympathetic witness to a naval mutiny at Table Bay, on the South African Cape, in November 1797. Just as in English waters the Nore mutiny followed the relative success of the "floating republic" at Spithead, so the mutiny of four ships of the line at Table Bay followed on the concessions won by the crews of eight warships further along Cape coast at Simon's Bay. Again as at Nore, the mutiny Tennent recorded witnessed tested the outer limits of command and were severely dealt with.

=== Philanthropist and reformer ===
In 1799, the year after the suppression of the United Irish rebellion, he returned to Belfast. His younger brother John was in exile in France enrolled in the service of Napoleon. His elder brother William was a state prisoner at Fort George, in Scotland. In his brother's absence, he looked after his business interests, becoming a partner in the New Sugar House in Waring Street. After William's release in 1802, he established himself in practice, becoming with doctors James MacDonnell, James Lawson Drummond and William Drennan (an original instigator of the United Irishmen), a pillar of the town's medical establishment.

Together with his brother, who recovered his position as Belfast's leading merchant banker, the four doctors became active as trustees, committee members and treasurers of in a variety of philanthropic societies including the Belfast Charitable Society, the Belfast Dispensary and Fever Hospital (forerunner to Royal Victoria Hospital, Belfast), the Society for Promoting Knowledge (the Linen Hall Library), the Mechanics Institute and House of Industry, the Belfast Harp Society, the Belfast Historic Society, and the Belfast (from 1835, Royal Belfast) Academical Institution. At the centre of a group of former Volunteers, unrepentant United men, and veteran reformers, they saw themselves as "natural leaders" of a townspeople still at odds with the Ascendancy.

In 1808, with Drennan, the botanist John Templeton and the dissident Quaker John Hancock, Tennent began publication of the Belfast Monthly Magazine. In what it described as "the spirit of true constitutional patriotism", the journal (which was to run for 77 issues) detailed and protested rack-renting and absentee landlordism, slavery in the colonies, the continued war with France, the government's corrupting "courtship" of the Presbyterian clergy, and failure to deliver on the promise of political equality for Catholics.

=== Confrontation with the Tory establishment ===
In 1813 Tennent and Drennan formed the Friends of Civil and Religious Liberty which demanded inquiry into the disturbances that marked that year's Twelfth of July Orange celebrations (the town's first serious sectarian riots). They were outraged at the comparatively lenient six-month prison sentences handed to two Orangemen for killing two counter demonstrators Their victims, among a largely Catholic crowd, happened to be Protestants, likely Presbyterians. Many Presbyterians viewed the still largely Anglican (Church of Ireland) Orange Order as auxiliaries of the landowners and, in Belfast, of the Chichesters (the proprietary Lords Donegall) who had the corporation in their "pocket".

At a heated town meeting, the Rev. Edward May – vicar of Belfast, brother of Lady Donegall, and agent of the Chichester estate – dismissed Tennent's attempt to raise the issue of Orange violence with a disparaging remark about his brother William's revolutionary past. Tennent coming forward grasped May's arm and was arrested. Charged with assault he helped seal his own fate when, on bail, he encouraged the prosecution of the magistrate who was to try his case, Lady Donegall's brother-law, and the town's appointed Sovereign, Thomas Verner, for the attempted rape of a poor Catholic women, a pedlar, who had brought wares to his house. Tennent was committed for three months to the Carrickfergus goal. When he was released September 1814, Drennan complained bitterly that there was no public dinner or demonstration.

Tennent's subsequent behaviour as chairman of the Belfast Academical Institution's board of trustees, suggests that he was not intimidated. The Institution ("Inst"), which opened its doors in 1814 had been an expression of Drennan's resolve, after 1798, to "be content to get the substance of reform more slowly" and with "proper preparation of manners or principles". As originally devised by Drennan, the constitution of the school embodied broadly liberal principals of the kind he had hoped the United Irishmen would have advanced nationally. The school was to be open to pupils regardless of sex, class or religion; discipline would rely on "example" rather than on corporal punishment; and direction would be entrusted, not to an autocratic headmaster, but to a board of senior teachers. Although the land for the Institution had been granted by Lord Donegall, all of this aroused establishment suspicion. For the government, Lord Castlereagh was especially alarmed by the collegiate department that, for the first time allowed for the certification of candidates in Ireland for the Presbyterian ministry. He discerned "a deep laid scheme again to bring the Presbyterian Synod within the ranks of democracy".

Presiding over a St. Patrick's Day eve banquet attended by member of Inst's staff, management and board of visitors, Tennent spoke of passing onto a new generation the spirit of 1782 (the Volunteers) and 1792 (the Rights of Man celebrant United Irishmen). There followed a series of radical toasts: to the French and South American Revolutions, to Catholic Emancipation, to a "Radical Reform of the Representation of the People in Parliament", and, perhaps most controversially, to "the exiles of Erin" under "the wing of the republican eagle" in the United States. Despite Tennent's resignation and that of other board members present, it was five years before the government was persuaded to restore the annual £1,500 it had granted, reluctantly, for the college's seminary.

=== Free trade liberal ===
As with other professional men and merchants in his philanthropic circle, Tennent's democratic-reform politics was accompanied by an embrace of liberal political economy. In 1829, Tennent with his "impeccable humanitarian credentials" refused a subscription in support of distressed weavers' families. To do so, he believed, would be to subsidise low wages and so distort the local labour market. The emphasis, even in philanthropy, was on cultivating what he understood as habits of industry, thrift and self-help.

=== Family and death ===
Robert Tennent married Eliza McCrone, who died following the birth of their son, Robert James Tennent, in 1803. In 1824, citing "black consequences of slavery" that he had learned "too feelingly" from his own country, in 1824 Robert James volunteered to join the Greeks in their War of Independence. On his return to Belfast, he married a niece of the Henry Joy McCracken (executed in 1798), became a leader of the Friends of Civil and Religious liberty, and campaigned for Catholic Emancipation. He ran as a Whig in parliamentary elections against the Donegall interest for Parliament in 1832 and, with success, in 1847.

Robert Tennent died on 9 January 1837. He was preceded by his brother William (1832) and by his brother John. John, an officer in the service of Napoleon, was killed in battle in Germany, as it happened, on the same day, 18 August 1813, as his brother Robert was arrested at the town meeting in Belfast.
