= Clifton House, Belfast =

Historic building in Belfast, Northern Ireland

Clifton House
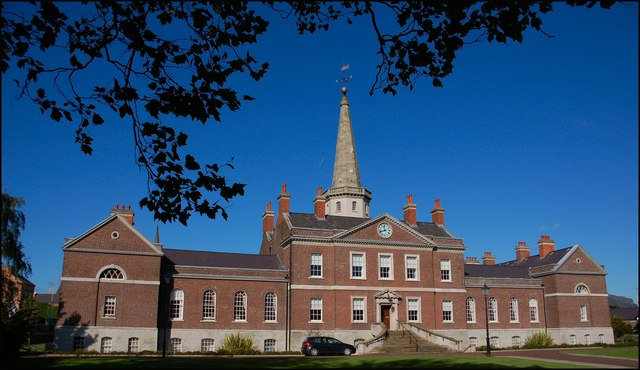
- Clifton House, October 2007
- Interactive map of the Clifton House area

General information
- Status: Open, Old Peoples Home
- Location: Belfast, Northern Ireland
- Coordinates: 54°36′22.96″N 5°55′59.86″W
- Construction started: 7 August 1771
- Opened: 17 September 1774
- Owner: Belfast Charitable Society

Design and construction
- Architect: Mr Cooley
- Designations: GradeA

Website
- www.cliftonbelfast.com

Clifton House is an 18th-century Grade A listed building located in Belfast, Northern Ireland. Originally built as a poor house by the Belfast Charitable Institution. Today it is houses a heritage centre alongside a residential home and sheltered accommodation apartments.

== Foundation ==
The Belfast Charitable Society was founded in August 1752, with the aim of setting up a poorhouse and a charitable hospital infirmary. The Society was financed by subscriptions collected from leading inhabitants of the then town of Belfast, and a nationwide lottery. After over 20 years, land was donated by Arthur Chichester, the first Marquess of Donegall to the north of the town, and a plan was drawn up by Mr Cooley for a combined 36 person poorhouse and 24 bed infirmary, estimated at £3,000 to construct.

In the centre of the final approved design were large assembly rooms. The foundation stone was laid on 7 August 1771, with the building opening on 17 September 1774.

== History ==
Quickly becoming full and continually operating at full capacity, the Society agreed in March 1800 to permit Dr William Haliday to try the first trials of inoculation and vaccination in Ireland. Subject to the condition of approval of their parents, poorhouse children were given vaccinations to protect them against diseases. The funds generated allowed the building to be extended, adding a lunatic ward. Doctor William Drennan, although never one of the Poor House's physicians, was a strong supporter of the Belfast Charitable Society, and gave sound medical advice, especially on the advantages of public inoculation against small pox to the Board. Drennan lodged in the house of Henry Joy McCracken and Mary Ann McCracken who had strong links to the Society. Edward Bunting (1773–1843), an Irish musician and folk music collector, asked the Committee to support him in organising a festival, the proceeds of which were donated to the Charitable Society.

A small sub-group of the Society's committee went to England to establish high-value trades which the poor should be trained in, and having studied the Lancashire cotton trade, came back to Belfast with the plan of training all inmates in the skills of the same industry. Hence training was set up on weaving, spinning, knitting, and net-making. The result was the foundation of Belfast's cotton industry.

== Present ==
After Belfast Charitable Society celebrated its 250th anniversary in 2002, it decided to build a new nursing home at Carlisle Circus. This allowed them to lease Clifton House to Helm Housing Association for 75 years, allowing funding of required renovation work. Clifton House is now shared by Helm who operate sheltered accommodation, and the Society who run an old persons home.

The Clifton House Interpretative Centre offers tours of the building and the associated Clifton Street Cemetery, Belfast which can be booked via their website. The cemetery includes the burials of many associated with Clifton House including Mary Ann McCracken, Thomas McCabe and William Drennan.
