= John Tennant (Irish Legion) =

- "John Tennent" circa 1810
- Born: 18 August 1777; Roseyards, County Antrim, Kingdom of Ireland
- Died: 18 August 1813 (aged 36); Goldberg, Silesia, Kingdom of Prussia
- Burial place: near Goldberg, Silesia
- Relatives: William Tennant, Robert Tennent
- Military career
- Allegiance: United Irishmen; French First Republic; First French Empire
- Service years: 1799 and 1803-1813
- Rank: Chef de bataillon
- Unit: Irish Legion
- Conflicts: Anglo-Russian invasion of Holland; German campaign of 1813
- Awards: Légion d'honneur

John Tennant (1777–1813) (often spelt John Tennent) was an Ulster Presbyterian and a militant member of the Society of the United Irishmen and its northern executive. Facing the prospect of joining his brother William in prison, and hoping to join Wolfe Tone in expediting French assistance, he left Ireland in the summer of 1797. After the crushing of the risings in Ireland in 1798, he took service in the French army under Napoleon serving with distinction in the Irish Legion. He was killed in battle in Silesia in August 1813.

== Early life ==
John Tennant was born in 1777 at Roseyards near Ballymoney, County Antrim, in the Kingdom of Ireland, the sixth of eight children born to Reverend John Tennant and Ann Patton. His father had been one of the first Scottish Anti-Bugher Presbyterian ministers to settle in Ulster. Seceders from the Church of Scotland, they refused to accept a sacramental oath (the Burgher Oath) as a condition of public office. It was a position that had radical implications in Ireland where such oaths secured the Protestant [Anglican] Ascendancy their monopoly of position and influence against both Presbyterians and the kingdom's dispossessed Roman Catholic majority. Rev. Tennent was an early subscriber to the Northern Star, the newspaper of the Society of United Irishmen.

At age fourteen John entered a four-year apprenticeship with a grocer's merchant in Coleraine. At the end of this unhappy experience he moved to Belfast where, through his elder brother William, a sugar merchant, he made the acquaintance of leading United Irishmen, including the Dublin attorney Theobald Wolfe Tone. While he readily sympathised with the cause of civil and religious liberty and of national independence, he attributed his decision to take the United Irish test or pledge in March 1793 to his indignation at the sight of dragoons dragging people through the streets many of them maimed and gashed. Reportedly provoked by their displays of the likenesses of Dumouriez, Mirabeau and Franklin, the soldiers had attacked taverns in the town as well as the homes and businesses of those associated with the democratic cause.

== The United Irishmen ==
The unsuccessful French expedition to invade Ireland in December 1796 alerted the Crown authorities to the real and present danger posed by the United Irishmen. Throughout 1797, severe measures were taken to break up and disarm the United organisation which, in the hope of French assistance, was increasingly intent on insurrection. John's brother William and other leaders were caught in a dragnet. William was later to suggest his arrest was due to his being mistaken in an informant's report for his younger brother who had been in the chair at a meeting of the United Irish northern executive at which a rising was discussed.

With two other Ulster delegates, Alexander Lowry and Bartholomew Teeling, John Tennant urged the movement's leaders in Dublin to act upon an offer presented by a conspiracy within the government's Clare, Kilkenny and Kildare militias to seize Dublin Castle. When this was rejected, and anticipating their own arrest, the three decided to leave Ireland and help solicit French assistance.

Via Hamburg, Tennant reached Texel with Lowry on 5 August, where they met Tone aboard a Dutch fleet that was readying to carry a French and Dutch invasion force—but not, it seemed, to Ireland. When interviewed by General Daendels, the new Irish arrivals found themselves being closely questioned about Scotland. They assured him that, with Irish assistance, the United system had taken hold in some of the principal manufacturing towns, such as Paisley and Glasgow, but they were unable to say whether Scottish patriots were ready to rise in the case of an invasion.

To Tone, they reported that the revolutionary spirit in Ireland was waning. The failure of the French to strike during the five weeks in the spring when the British navy was paralysed by the mutinies at Spithead and Nore had caused United men to almost suspect their leaders of having deceived them. Many who had held out until June, were now taking an oath of allegiance to the government and surrendering their arms.

When in October the British naval victory at Camperdown dispelled any hopes of a Franco-Dutch assault, Tennent and Lowry accompanied Tone to Paris. On 23 December they had an audience with Napoleon. For reasons that remain unclear, Tennent did not accompany Tone on his ill-fated expedition to Ireland under Admiral Bompart in October 1798 (two months after the last significant rebel resistance in the country had been broken).

== The Irish Legion ==
In 1799, Tennant enlisted with the French, serving first, with the provisional rank of chef de bataillon, in the Army of the North under General Brune. His corps helped drive the combined Anglo-Russian army out of Holland. He then temporarily returned to civilian life in Paris. By a decree dated 13 Fructidor, Year 11 (31 August 1803), Bonaparte created the formation of a battalion that would be composed entirely of Irishmen or sons of Irishmen. Tennant was commissioned in this "Irish Legion" with the rank of captain on 22 Frimaire, Year 12 (13 December 1803).

In May of the following year, Bonaparte was proclaimed Emperor. The coronation took place in December 1804. Each regiment in the army sent two representatives to Paris for the ceremonies and celebrations. Recognised as the two senior captains in the Legion by virtue of their prior service with the army, Tennent and William Corbet had the honour of representing the regiment. From Napoleon, they received the only Eagle that the emperor was to give to a foreign regiment in his service.

The Legion was based at Lesneven, then Quimper in Brittany. It was still made up almost exclusively of officers, with only a few NCOs and soldiers. Early December 1806 they were moved to Mayence and the Legion became a true military unit. Twelve hundred Polish and Irish prisoners of war volunteered to join the French Army. In early 1807 they were on the move to the island of Walcheren. Throughout the autumn of that year the Legion suffered the drastic effects of malaria. In the November of that year it was reorganised into two battalions. The 2nd Battalion was sent to Spain to join the army commanded by Marshal Murat that marched to Madrid in 1808. Tennant was one of those who needed to remain behind with the 1st Battalion since he was suffering the effects of the fever.

In the spring of 1809, the Irish Legion was given a new name and organisation. By a decree dated 13 April, the Emperor established the 3rd Foreign Regiment as a French light infantry regiment. About the same time it was decided to raise a 3rd Battalion and Tennant, as the senior captain, with four officers from the 1st Battalion, was ordered to Landau to form the nucleus of the new battalion. As such he missed the English landing on 30 July 1809. On 9 November he was promoted to the rank of chef de bataillon and named commandant of the new 4th Battalion.

By imperial decree dated 1 January 1811, the regiment was re-organised, and a week later moved from Landau to Bois-le-Duc (s’Hertogenbosch) in The Netherlands. Tennant's 4th Battalion was consolidated into the 1st. of which he was given the overall command. Fortunately, given the enormous losses and hardships the Grand Army was to suffer during the Russian Campaign of 1812, the Irish Regiment remained in Holland until February 1813. On the other hand, they were stationed on the island of Goree and the towns of Bergen op Zoom, and Willemstadt, all three in the low-lying, malaria-stricken, district of southwest Holland.

Early in 1813 the Irish Regiment was ordered to merge the three existing battalions into two full-strength war battalions. Command of the 1st Battalion went to Tennant and that of the 2nd Battalion to Chef de Bataillon Hugh Ware. On 1 February they broke camp and made a long winter march to Magdeburg. The Irish Regiment made forced marches to arrive on the battlefield of Bautzen during the morning of 21 May, the second day of the battle. At the head of Puthod's Division they attacked Barclay's Corps on the extreme allied right.

On 26 May they fought with distinction at the Battle of Haynau under the direct command of the emperor. The Irish were rewarded by being given the honour of posting guard at the town of Lignitz (Legnica) for Napoleon until the Imperial Guard arrived and relieved them.

== Death in battle ==
On 16 August, at the end of the brief armistice, Puthod's Division, including Vacherau's Brigade (The Irish Regiment, 134th & 143rd Regiments), were assembled at Goldberg in Silesia. On the eighteenth, Blucher's cavalry made contact with Puthod. The regiment formed squares to repel a cavalry attack: the squares held fast, and after a number of attempts to break them, the enemy backed off and brought forward artillery. They were then easy targets for cannon fire, losing 400 men before retiring in good order. This affair was the most bloody that the Irish Regiment had seen since it had joined the army in March. Three hundred men had been killed or wounded. Two officers were killed and ten wounded.

poor Tennant was giving orders to have the ranks closed and the gaps filled, which had been opened by the artillery, when he fell. He was cut completely in two; the cannon ball striking a belt in which he carried his money served as a knife to separate the body. The soldiers dug his grave with their bayonets, and when burying him found several pieces of gold that fell out of his entrails and part of his gold watch.

Few of Tennent's comrades survived the rearguard action they were now obliged to fight against combined Prussian and Russian forces. Just eight Irish Legionnaires escaped a final stand at Löwenberg on the 29th—carrying with them the regimental eagle.

== Brothers in Belfast ==
On the day John Tennent was killed, 18 August 1813, in Belfast his brother Robert Tennent MD was dragged from a public meeting to the town goal (the "Black Hole"). As he had pressed forward in the meeting to raise the issue of a deadly Orange Order outrage in the town, he was accused of assaulting a prominent member of the local Tory establishment (and subsequently served three months).

John Tennent was also survived in Belfast by his eldest brother, William Tennant. After his release as a state prisoner in 1802, William re-established himself as a merchant banker. Together with his brother Robert, he was the patron of various liberal and philanthropic causes, including—with William Drennan and a number of other former United Irishmen—the foundation of the Belfast (later Royal Belfast) Academical Institution.
