= Gilbert McIlveen =

United Irishmen founding member

Gilbert McIlveen (17? – 1833) was a Belfast linen draper and founding member of the Society of the United Irishmen, a revolutionary organisation in late 18th century Ireland. He took no part in the rebellion of 1798 and in 1803, in response to rumours of a further republican insurrection, he joined the loyalist yeomanry.

== Life ==
McIlveen was a linen draper in Belfast, described as fabulously wealthy. An important member of Belfast's mercantile and industrial middle class, he donated £100 to the building of a new White Linen Hall in 1782, to act as a centre for the bustling linen industry in the city. Another important benefactor to the building of the hall was fellow future United Irishman, Thomas McCabe.

== The United Irishmen ==
The United Irishmen were initially founded as a group of liberal Protestant and Presbyterian men interested in promoting Parliamentary reform, and later became a revolutionary movement influenced by the ideas of Thomas Paine and his book ‘The Rights of Man’. In 1791 Theobald Wolfe Tone published the pamphlet ‘Argument on Behalf of the Catholics of Ireland’ where he set out that religious division was being used to balance “the one party by the other, plunder and laugh at the defeat of both.” He put forward the case for unity between Catholics, Protestants and Dissenters.

This pamphlet was read by McIlveen and a group of eight other prominent Belfast Presbyterians interested in reforming Irish Parliament. They invited Tone and his friend Thomas Russell to Belfast where the group met on October 14, 1791. It was there that the Belfast Society of the United Irishmen was formed, with McIlveen as a founding member.

== 1798 Rebellion and later life ==
In March 1798, most of the leadership of the Leinster branch of the Society were meeting at the house of Oliver Bond in Dublin, when they were arrested. This crippled the organisation. Many of its leaders, such as Russell and Thomas Addis Emmet were already in prison, while others like Tone and Arthur O'Connor were in Europe. Meanwhile, Lord Edward Fitzgerald was in hiding, with a government net closing around him.

Nonetheless, in May, the rising finally began. First in Kildare, it spread to other counties in Leinster before finally consuming Ulster. Ultimately, the rising failed with enormous bloodshed.

McIlveen seems to have taken no part in the plans or execution for the rebellion, and he was never imprisoned, unlike fellow founders like Henry Haslett and Thomas Russell.

On 5 April 1803, responding to rumours of a renewed rebellion (the conspiratorial plans of Robert Emmet and Anne Devlin for which Russel and Jemmy Hope vainly sought to raise northern support) citizens in Belfast proclaimed their readiness to repel the attacks of foreign or domestic enemies. Two new corps were raised and, with another former United Irishman, Robert Getty, McIlveen was one of three lieutenants appointed.

Indeed, by 1809 he was painted by Thomas Robinson in his work 'A Military Procession in Belfast in honour of Lord Nelson', appearing as a loyal servant to the British crown Thomas McCabe. Like other early members of the United Irishmen, such as William Drennan, it is possible that McIlveen was put off by the growing radicalism of the organisation. With Drennan, and other former United Irishmen, he was active in the Belfast Harp Society, acting from 1808 as its chairman. McIlveen died in 1833 in Belfast.
