= Belfast River =

Belfast River may refer to:

- Belfast River (Dominica), a river in Dominica
- Belfast River (Georgia), a river in the United States
