= William Steel Dickson =

Irish Presbyterian minister (1744–1824)

- Born: 25 December 1744; County Antrim, Ireland
- Died: 27 December 1824 (aged 80); Belfast, County Antrim, Ireland
- Resting place: Clifton Street Cemetery, Belfast
- Occupation: Presbyterian church minister
- Known for: Irish Revolutionary
- Political party: United Irishmen
- Spouse: Isabella Gamble

William Steel Dickson (1744–1824) was an Irish Presbyterian minister and member of the Society of the United Irishmen, committed to the cause of Catholic Emancipation, democratic reform, and national independence. He was arrested on the eve of the United Irish rising in his native County Down in June 1798, and not released until January 1802.

== Early life ==
Dickson was born on 25 December 1744, the eldest son of John Dickson, a tenant farmer of Ballycraigy, in the parish of Carnmoney, County Antrim. His mother was Jane Steel and on the death (13 May 1747) of his uncle, William Steel, the family added his Mother's maiden name to their own.

In his boyhood, Dickson was educated by Robert White, a Presbyterian minister from Templepatrick and entered University of Glasgow in November 1761. On leaving graduating he seems to have been employed for a time in teaching, and in 1771 he was ordained as a Presbyterian minister. Until the outbreak of the American War of Independence he occupied himself mainly with parochial and domestic duties. His political career began in 1776, when he spoke and preached against the “unnatural, impolitic and unprincipled” war with the American colonies, denouncing it as a “mad crusade”. On two government fast-days his sermons—on “the advantages of national repentance” (13 December 1776), and on “the ruinous effects of civil war” (27 February 1778) created considerable excitement when published. Government loyalists denounced Dickson as a traitor.

Political differences were probably at the root of a secession from his congregation in 1777. The seceders formed a new congregation at Kirkcubbin, in defiance of the authority of the general synod.

In 1771 he married Isabella Gamble, a woman of some means, who died on 15 July 1819. Dickson had at least 8 children, but outlived them all. One of his sons was in the Royal Navy and died in 1798.

== Volunteers and politics ==
Dickson entered with zest into the volunteer movement of 1778, being warmly in favour of the admission of Roman Catholics to the ranks. This was resisted “through the greater part of Ulster, if not the whole”. In a sermon to the Echlinville volunteers (28 March 1779) Dickson advocated the enrolment of Catholics, and though induced to modify his language in printing the discourse, he offended “all the Protestant and Presbyterian bigots in the country”. He was accused of being a papist at heart, “for the very substantial reason, among others, that the maiden name of the parish priest's mother was Dickson”.

Though the contrary has been stated, Dickson was not a member of the Volunteer conventions at Dungannon in 1782 and 1783. He threw himself heart and soul into the famous election for County Down in August 1783, when the families of Hill and Stewart, competed for the county seat in Parliament. Dickson, with his forty-shilling freeholders, failed to secure the election of Robert Stewart. But in 1790 he successfully campaigned for the election of Stewart's son (also Robert), better known as Lord Castlereagh. Castlereagh proved his gratitude by referring at a later date to Dickson's popularity in 1790, as proof that he was "a very dangerous person to leave at liberty".

== Society of the United Irishmen ==
In December 1791, Dickson joined Robert White's son, John Campbell White, taking the “test” of the first Society of United Irishmen, organised in October in Belfast following a meeting held with Theobald Wolfe Tone, Protestant secretary of the Catholic Committee in Dublin. According to Dickson himself, he attended no further meetings of the Society, but devoted himself to spreading its principles among the volunteer associations, in opposition to the 'demi-patriotic' views of the Whig Club.

At a great volunteer meeting in Belfast on 14 July 1792 he opposed a resolution for the gradual removal of Catholic disabilities, and assisted in obtaining a unanimous pledge in favour of total and immediate emancipation. Parish and county meetings were held throughout Ulster, culminating in a provincial convention at Dungannon on 15 February 1793. Dickson had been a leading spirit at many of the preliminary meetings, and, as a delegate from the Barony of Ards, he had a chief hand in the preparation of the Dungannon resolutions. Their avowed object was to strengthen the throne and give vitality to the constitution by “a complete and radical reform.” Dickson was nominated on a committee of thirty to summon a national convention. The Irish parliament went no further in the direction of emancipation than the Roman Catholic Relief Act 1793, which received the royal assent on 9 April, and remained unextended till 1829; while the passing of Lord Clare's Convention Act, still in force, made illegal all future assemblies of delegates “purporting to represent the people, or any description of the people.”

== Rebellion of 1798 and imprisonment ==
In March and April 1798 Dickson was in Scotland arranging some family affairs. During his absence a plans were made for an insurrection in Ulster, and soon after his return Dickson agreed to take the place of Thomas Russell, who had been arrested, as adjutant-general of the United Irish forces for county Down. A few days before the county was to rise Dickson was himself arrested at Ballynahinch.

Dickson was conveyed to Belfast, and lodged in the 'black hole' and other prisons, till 12 August when he was removed to a prison ship with William Tennant, Robert Hunter and Robert Simms, David Bailie Warden and Thomas Ledlie Birch, and detained there amid considerable discomfort. On 25 March 1799, Dickson, Tennant, Hunter, and Simms joined the United Irish 'State Prisoners' on a ship bound for Fort George, Highland prison in Scotland. This group, which included Samuel Neilson, Arthur O'Connor, Thomas Russell, William James MacNeven, and Thomas Addis Emmet arrived in Scotland on 9 April 1799. Dickson would spend two years there.

Unlike the more high-profile prisoners like O'Connor and MacNeven who would not be released until June 1802, Tennant, Dickson, and Simms were permitted to return to Belfast in January 1802.

== Later life and death ==
Dickson returned to liberty and misfortune. His wife had long been a helpless invalid, his eldest son was dead, his prospects were ruined. His congregation at Portaferry had been declared vacant on 28 November 1799. William Moreland, who had been ordained as his successor on 16 June 1800, at once offered to resign, but Dickson would not hear of this. He had thoughts of emigration, but decided to stand his ground. At length, he was chosen by a seceding minority from the congregation of Keady, County Armagh, and installed minister on 4 March 1803.

Dickson’s political engagement ended with his attendance on 9 September 1811 of a Catholic meeting in Armagh, on returning from which he was cruelly beaten by Orangemen. In 1815 he resigned his charge in broken health, and henceforth subsisted on charity. Joseph Wright, an Episcopalian lawyer, gave him a cottage rent-free in the suburbs of Belfast, and some of his old friends made him a weekly allowance. His last appearance in the pulpit was early in 1824. He died on 27 December 1824, having just passed his eightieth year, and was buried 'in a pauper's grave' at Clifton Street Cemetery, Belfast.
