= Clifton Street Cemetery =

Cemetery in Belfast, Northern Ireland

Coordinates: 54.6079°N 5.9353°W

Clifton Street Cemetery, Belfast, holds the graves of a number of Belfast's most distinguished figures. The cemetery, whose entrance is at Henry Place in Belfast, is cared for by Belfast City Council and can only be accessed by prior arrangement with council officials. The cemetery contains the graves of members of the United Irishmen and social reformers as well as industrialists. There are also approximately 8,000 people buried in the cemetery's poor ground.

The cemetery contains one war grave burial registered by the Commonwealth War Graves Commission – that of Major William Basil Ewart (late Royal Irish Rifles) who died in 1920. He was accepted for belated commemoration by the CWGC in 2011, it being established he died of illness contracted serving in the First World War.

== Notable interments ==
- Henry Joy McCracken (United Irishman)
- Mary Ann McCracken (United Irishwoman and social reformer)
- William Drennan (founder of United Irishmen)
- William Steel Dickson (United Irishman)
- Thomas McCabe (United Irishman)
- Francis Dalzell Finlay (founder of the Northern Whig newspaper)
- Alexander Henry Haliday, physician and politician
