= Belfast River (Dominica) =

River in Dominica

Coordinates: 15°22′N 61°25′W

The Belfast River is a river on the Caribbean island of Dominica. Parts of the river flow at near-boiling temperatures due to geothermal activity near the river's midpoint.

The name possibly derives from the sugar plantation owned, in the late 18th century, by Waddell Cunningham and Thomas Greg, merchants in Belfast, Ireland.

== Geography ==
The Belfast River originates on the western slope of the Morne Trois Piton. Its catchment area is wide, mainly between the Morne Boyer and Mount Joy/Deux Jardins.

It borders the catchment areas of Massacre River and Mahaut River. The spring streams from the height of the Morne Trois Pitons, or from the plateau at Middleham Estate first run west, then turn almost at right angles to the north and unite at Corona Estate to turn west again after about 2 ½ km.

The river passes Deux Saisons in the north and turns at Belmont, where it receives inflow from several small tributaries from the left and south, again to the north, but at Bon Repos receives inflow from another source river from the right and east and turns from there to the southwest again.

At Charrurier, it receives numerous tributaries from Mount Joy from the right and north, but also from Bon Repos in the south and also forms a dividing course in the lowlands on the coast before it forms a small river delta between Mahaut and Jimmit and flows into the Caribbean Sea there.

To the north, the catchment area of the Layou River adjoins. A tributary forms the small Salton Waterfalls.

== See also ==
- List of rivers of Dominica
