= Henry Haslett (United Irishmen) =

Hennry Haslett
- Born: 1758; Kingdom of Ireland
- Died: 1806 (aged 47–48); Belfast, County Antrim, United Kingdom
- Resting place: Knockbreda Cemetery, Belfast
- Occupation: Draper
- Known for: Irish Revolutionary
- Political party: United Irishmen

Henry Haslett (1758 – 1806) was in 1791 a founding member in Belfast of the democratic-revolutionary Society of the United Irishmen, and one of the twelve original proprietors of its Painite newspaper, the Northern Star. He had been representative of a group of merchants in the city who had chafed at the Navigation Acts and other measures enacted under the British Crown that restricted Irish trade and industry. He was released from fourteen months detention just before the Irish Rebellion of 1798 in which he played no role. After the 1800 Acts of Union incorporating Ireland in a United Kingdom with Great Britain, he was again active in the commercial life of Belfast promoting its growth as a port.

== Free trader and Volunteer ==
Born in Limavady, in Belfast Haslett initially set up business as a woollen draper but soon diversified with investments in Whitbread Porter, shipping and insurance. In the 1790s he was a leading member of a shipping syndicate known as the "New Traders". The New Traders (who commissioned several ships from William Ritchie's yard in Belfast) protested English restrictions on Irish trade and industry and called for "free trade". Together with parliamentary reform. This was a demand taken up by the Volunteer movement.

The Volunteers formed in the American War as a reserve militia in the event of a French invasion, mobilised Protestants but, more especially in the north of Ireland, Presbyterians in opposition to the landed Ascendancy and its deference to English interests represented by the government of the London-appointed Lord Lieutenant.

With many other men of his class, Haslett joined the Volunteers becoming a captain in a Belfast corps. He shared in the general patriotic enthusiasm for liberties seen as secured in America through independence, in France by the Revolution, and vindicated in Thomas Paine's Rights of Man. When, nationally, the Volunteer movement split over the question of whether to broaden its membership and appeal to the Kingdom's disenfranchised Catholic majority, Haslett took a more radical course.

== The United Irishmen ==
In October 1791 Haslett was among the group of nine Belfast Presbyterians, Volunteers and Freemasons, who gathered in Belfast to meet Theobald Wolfe Tone and his friend Thomas Russell. Tone had published an "Argument on Behalf of the Catholics of Ireland" in which he maintained that the Crown exploited the division between Protestant and Catholic in Ireland so as to balance “the one party by the other, [and to] plunder and laugh at the defeat of both.” He called for a patriotic union to break the connection with England which maintained the Ascendancy and blocked the path to a national and representative government. Convinced of his case, those gathered convened themselves as the Society of United Irishmen.

Haslett became one of twelve shareholders in the Society's paper, the Northern Star, edited in Belfast by Samuel Neilson. In June 1794, with the Crown at war with the French Republic, as a proprietor Haslett was convicted of seditious libel. The paper's presses were destroyed and publication suppressed in May 1797. The Society had replicated in the market towns around Belfast in the north-east, in Dublin and, in alliance with the Catholic Defenders across the Irish midlands and into the south-east. Despair at the prospects for reform and hopes of French invasion, encouraged preparations for insurrection. The government used martial law measures that gave its forces virtual impunity to break up and disarm the movement.

== Imprisonment and the Rebellion ==
In September 1796, Haslett was arrested along with Russell and Neilson, understood by the Lord Lieutenant, Earl Camden to be "the most leading characters in Belfast" and "all men of abilitys". Haslett was held for 14 months in Dublin's Kilmainham Gaol before his release in December 1797. While he was in jail two of his children died, as well as his sister who was taken ill in Dublin while coming to visit him. She was 23.

Haslett took no part in the insurrection when it finally came, beginning in May in the south and in June in the northeast. In spite of having done much to counsel moderation and calm tensions in his native Limavady and Roe Valley, he was again arrested and held until December 1799

== Last years ==
After his release from prison, Haslett, possibly to allay suspicion, made a public donation to the loyalist Belfast yeomanry. The early historian of the United Irishmen, R. R. Madden, does say that, after the rebellion, Haslett supplied the government with information.

Haslett's business survived and in 1802 and 1804 he served on the Belfast Chamber of Commerce, concerned particularly with issues concerning Lagan navigation and improvement to the port.

Haslett died in 1806, at the age of 48, and was buried in Knockbreda Cemetery, Belfast. His oration was given by his old comrade in the United Irishmen, Reverend William Steel Dickson.
