= Robert Simms (United Irishmen) =

Robert Simms (20 March 1761 – 1843) was an Irish radical, and a founding member in Belfast of the Society of United Irishmen. Opposed to insurrection in the absence of French assistance, he resigned his military commission in the Society on the eve of the 1798 rebellion.

A Presbyterian born in Belfast, Simms was the owner of a paper mill in Ballyclare with his brother William Simms, one of twelve proprietors of the Northern Star newspaper. A close friend of Wolfe Tone who nicknamed him 'the Tanner', he was one of the founders of the Society of United Irishmen in Belfast in 1791 and the author of "Declaration and Resolutions of the Society of United Irishmen of Belfast." Simms served as the first Secretary of the Society, drafting many of its early letters, pamphlets and papers.

Following the French declaration of war on Britain in February 1793, the movement was outlawed and went underground from 1794 as they became more determined to force a revolt against British rule. Simms, along with his brother William and Thomas Addis Emmet were arrested, but swiftly acquitted. The leadership was divided into those who wished to wait for French aid before rising and the more radical elements that wished to press ahead regardless. However, the suppression of a bloody preemptive rebellion, which broke out in Leitrim in 1793, led to the former faction prevailing and links were forged with the revolutionary French government with instructions to wait sent to all of the United Irish membership.

In 1795, along with Tone, Samuel Neilson and Thomas Russell met atop the summit of McArt's Fort, overlooking Belfast, and, in Tone's words, "took a solemn obligation...never to desist in our efforts until we had subverted the authority of England over our country and asserted her independence." The Simms brothers were again arrested in 1797 and held in Newgate Prison. From there he was transported along with Russell and Emmett to Fort George, Scotland. In his absence, the press of the Northern Star was burned.

Upon his release, he was appointed as Commander of the United Army in Antrim. The appointment was met reluctantly, however, as Simms felt his lack of military experience counted against him being an effective leader. In addition, many leaders were beginning to agitate for a rising without French aid. Simms was unwavering in his rejection of this idea. He resigned his position on 1 June 1798 after falling out with the leadership on this issue when most had changed their minds. He was replaced by Henry Joy McCracken who would lead the society in the Battle of Antrim. Simms was accused by many of cowardice and indecision for his refusal to launch an insurrection in Antrim.

He was nonetheless arrested and again imprisoned in Fort George with Emmet and William James MacNeven and was released in 1802. When Robert Emmet's failed coup was launched in 1803, the Simms brothers did not participate. He died in 1843, at the age of 82.

Robert Simms was a friend of the naturalist John Templeton and his son, also Robert Simms, was one of the founders of the Belfast Natural History Society.
