= William James MacNeven =

Irish-American writer and physician

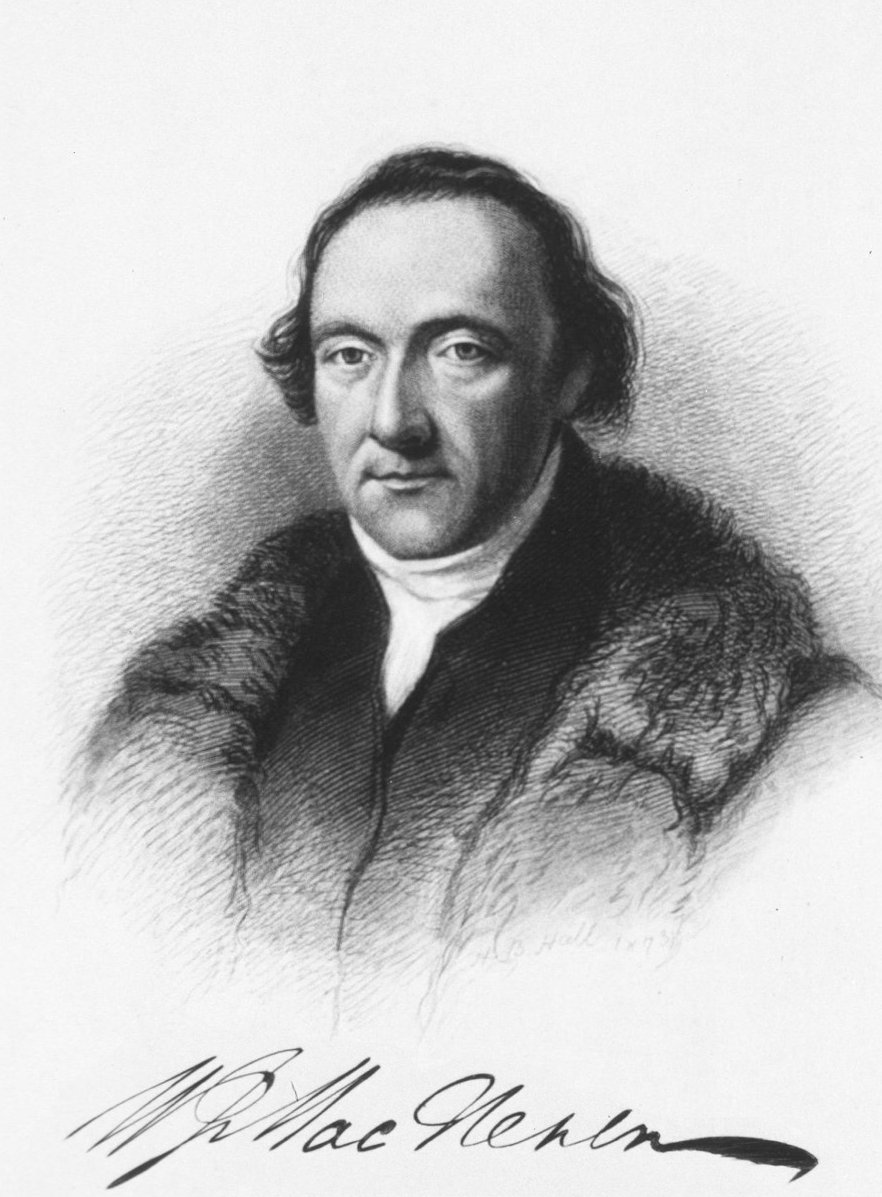
- Born: 21 March 1763; Aughrim, County Galway, Ireland
- Died: 13 July 1841 (aged 78); New York City, United States
- Occupation: physician

William James MacNeven (also sometimes rendered as MacNevin or McNevin) (21 March 1763 Ballinahown, near Aughrim, County Galway, Ireland – 12 July 1841 New York City) was an Irish physician who, having sought assistance in France for the United Irish Rebellion of 1798, was forced into American exile. In the United States, he became a champion of religious and civil liberty, and a "father of American chemistry". Alongside his fellow Irish exile and abolitionist, Thomas Addis Emmet, in New York City, MacNeven is commemorated with a public memorial, an obelisk, at St. Paul's Chapel, Broadway.

== Republican conspirator in Ireland ==
The eldest of four sons, at the age of 12 he was sent by his uncle Baron MacNeven, to receive his education abroad, for the penal laws rendered education impossible for Catholics in Ireland. This Baron MacNeven was William O'Kelly MacNeven, an Irish exile physician, who for his medical skill in her service had been created an Austrian noble by the Empress Maria Theresa. Young MacNeven made his collegiate studies at Prague. His medical studies were made at Vienna where he was a pupil of Pestel and took his degree in 1784. The same year he returned to Dublin to practise.

He became a member of the Catholic Committee, and in December 1792 he was returned from Navan as a delegate to the Catholic Convention held in the Tailor's Hall, Back Lane. In this "Back Lane Parliament" he joined Committee chairman, John Keogh, and secretary, Wolfe Tone, in pressing for full and immediate Catholic Emancipation.

At the same time, he joined the United Irishmen at the solicitation of Arthur O'Connor and Lord Edward Fitzgerald. He took the society's test or oath to advance, in the cause of a national and representative government for Ireland, a union of Catholic and Protestant, from Fitzgerald's friend and protector, Mary Moore. With Oliver Bond, Richard McCormick (McCormack) and Bernard MacSheehy (Tone's aide-de-camp), he conspired to solicit French assistance for a republican insurrection.

After returning from Paris, where he had conferred with Tone, in March 1798 MacNevan was arrested in March 1798 and confined in Kilmainham Jail. After the suppression of the rebellion in the summer of 1798, he was held with other senior United Irish leaders as a state prisoner in Fort George, Scotland. On condition of exile, he was released in 1802. The following year he was in Paris seconding the efforts of Robert Emmet to persuade Napoleon Bonaparte to commit troops to Ireland. In anticipation, MacNevan joined Irish Legion as a captain. But following the failure of Emmet's rising in Dublin in July 1803 and despairing of the intentions of the now Emperor Napoleon, he decided, as did others in the Legion, to leave for the United States.

== Reflections on the rebellion ==
MacNeven arrived in New York on 4 July 1805. While he resumed his practice of medicine, MacNeven continued to identify himself publicly with Irish affairs.

In 1807 he published and edited Pieces of Irish History, a volume which included essays by him and Thomas Addis Emmet, as well as state papers, memoirs and letters relevant to the history of the United Irishmen. Its publication, according to MacNeven, was necessitated by "abusive misrepresentation" by "hirelings" of the British crown, and by prominent Federalists such as Rufus King, the former minister to Great Britain. Against the charge that United Irish had been agents of republican France, and that in the United States, he and his fellow exiles should be regarded as subversives, MacNeven argued that soliciting French assistance Irish patriots had made the same pragmatic calculation as had the Continental Congress in courting Louis XVI--and indeed the same calculation as had English patriots when in 1688 they invited the armed intervention of William of Orange. At the same time, and in line with an established United Irish narrative, MacNeven maintained that the Irish had been victims of a conspiracy by the Crown to foment rebellion as a pretext for destroying in the Acts of Union the remaining vestiges of their independence.

While he had been critical of Daniel O'Connell, the completion of Catholic Emancipation in 1829, and subsequent reforms, persuaded MacNeven that there was no longer a role in Ireland for physical-force republicanism. "We must all prefer to the most successful use of physical violence", he declared in his last public address, "the moral, peaceful revolution which O'Connell is now effecting by the masterly employment of his powers acquired to his country since 1798".

== Career in the United States ==
In 1807, he delivered a course of lectures on clinical medicine in the recently established College of Physicians and Surgeons. Here in 1808, he received the appointment of professor of midwifery. In 1810, at the reorganization of the school, he became the professor of chemistry, and in 1816 was appointed in addition to the chair of materia medica. In 1823, MacNeven was elected to the American Philosophical Society. Sometime during these years, he taught chemistry to a fellow Irish immigrant named John Emmet, who received an appointment by Thomas Jefferson to establish a chemistry lab at the University of Virginia. Built around 1825 in the Lower East Oval Room of the University’s Rotunda, it was modelled after MacNeven's lab in New York with the intention of providing students with hands-on learning opportunities.

In 1826 with six of his colleagues, he resigned his professorship because of a misunderstanding with the New York Board of Regents, and accepted the chair of materia medica in Rutgers Medical College, a branch of the New Jersey institution of that name, established in New York as a rival to the College of Physicians and Surgeons. The school at once became popular because of its faculty, but after four years was closed by legislative enactment on account of interstate difficulties. The attempt to create a school independent of the regents resulted in a reorganization of the University of the State of New York.

For having "overhauled US university teaching of chemistry", MacNeven has been hailed (in competition with the discoverer of oxygen, Joseph Priestley) as "the father of American chemistry".

With William Sampson, MacNeven formed the Society of Friends of Religious and Civil Liberty. When on St Patrick's Day 1829, the society gathered in Tammany Hall in anticipation of Daniel O'Connell's imminent victory at Westminster (the King signed the Catholic Relief Act ending the Protestant monopoly of parliament a month later), MacNeven linked Catholic emancipation to the cause of abolition. In his presidential address, he told the banqueting members that they had convened for the same purpose that assembled "good men of all nations and creeds" to give "their voices against the enslavement of the Africans".

MacNeven is buried on the Riker Farm in the Astoria section of Queens, New York. He was honoured with a commemorative obelisk on the grounds of St. Paul's Chapel's graveyard in Lower Manhattan, matching one to his friend and fellow exile, Robert Emmet's elder brother, Thomas Addis Emmet.

== Family ==
MacNeven married, on 15 June 1810, Mrs. Jane Margaret (née Riker) Tom (1782–1868), widow of John Tom, merchant, of New York, and daughter of U.S. Representative Samuel Riker of New Town, Long Island, by whom he had several children.

== Works ==
MacNeven's best-known contribution to science is his "Exposition of the Atomic Theory" (New York, 1820), which was reprinted in the French Annales de Chimie. In 1821 he published with emendations an edition of Brande's "Chemistry" (New York, 1829). Some of his purely literary works, his "Rambles through Switzerland" (Dublin, 1803), his Pieces of Irish History (New York, 1807), and his numerous political tracts attracted wide attention. He was co-editor for many years of the "New York Medical and Philosophical Journal".
