= Henry Joy McCracken =

Irish republican (1767–1798)

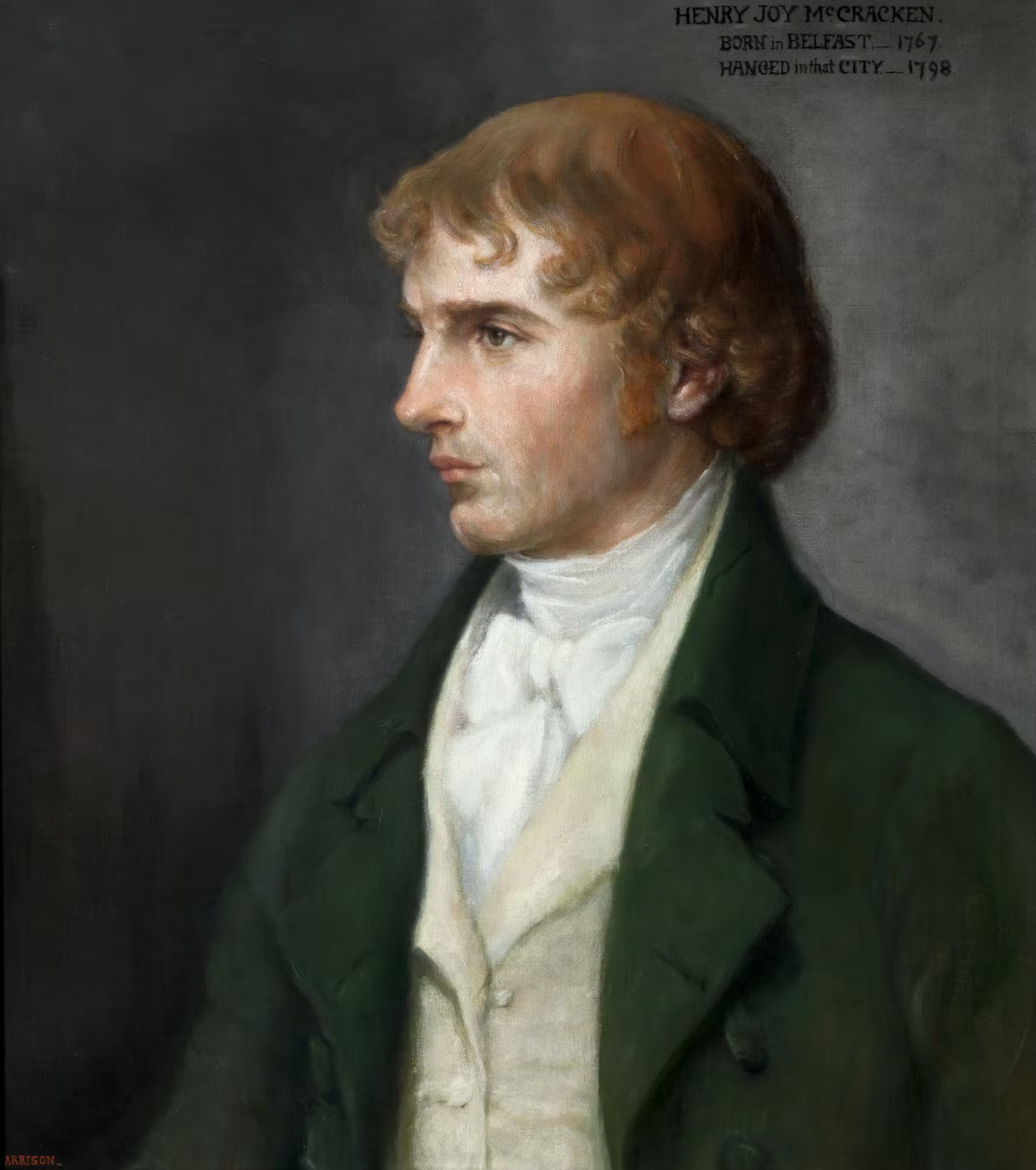
- Portrait by Sarah Cecilia Harrison, 1926
- Born: 31 August 1767; High Street, Belfast, Ireland
- Died: 17 July 1798 (aged 30); High Street, Belfast, Ireland
- Cause of death: court-martialled and hanged for treason
- Occupation: Textile manufacturer
- Movement: Society of United Irishmen

Henry Joy McCracken (31 August 1767 – 17 July 1798) was an Irish republican executed in Belfast for his part in leading United Irishmen in the Rebellion of 1798. Convinced that the cause of representative government in Ireland could not be advanced under the British Crown, McCracken had sought to forge a revolutionary union between his fellow Presbyterians in Ulster and the country's largely dispossessed Catholic majority. In June 1798, following reports of risings in Leinster, he seized the initiative from a leadership that hesitated to act without French assistance and led a rebel force against a British garrison in Antrim Town. Defeated, he was returned to Belfast where he was court-martialled and hanged.

== Early life and influences ==
Henry Joy McCracken was born at 39 High Street, Belfast into two of the town's most prominent Presbyterian merchant families. He was the son of a shipowner, Captain John McCracken and of Ann Joy, daughter of Francis Joy, of French Huguenot descent. The Joys, who made their money in linen manufacture, had founded the Whig paper Belfast News Letter in 1737, and were closely associated with the rise of the Volunteer movement during the American War.

With his younger sister, Mary Ann McCracken, he attended David Manson's school in Donegall Street. Through peer tutoring and play, Manson sought to banish "drudgery and fear" from children's education. His arranged his pupils in rank from kings and queens to tenants and subtenants, but in contrast to the hierarchy of Crown and landed Ascendancy against which McCracken was later to rebel, the role play was entirely meritocratic; involved mutual obligation (as the rent or tribute paid to rank was a certain portion of reading or a spelling lesson, to receive their due the higher ranks were induced to assist the lower, with all accounts settled at a Saturday "parliament"); and was not coerced. William Drennan noted that the key to the scheme was the "liberty of each to take the quantity [of lessons] agreeable to his inclination".

In 1788, McCracken and his sister attempted a school of their own: a Sunday morning reading and writing class for the poor. Their decision to omit religious instruction and hold the school open to children of all sects proved a provocation. They were not long in session before they were visited in the Market House by the Revd William Bristow, Belfast's Anglican vicar and Lord Donegall's sometime nominee as town Sovereign. Together with several stick-wielding women, he put the “young pioneers” to flight.

The family's minister at the Third Presbyterian Church in Rosemary Street, Sinclair Kelburn was a strong supporter of the Volunteer movement. On the pretext of securing the Kingdom against the French in the American War, the citizens' militia or "National Guard" as it was later styled, allowed Presbyterians to arm, drill and convene independently of the Anglican Ascendancy. Kelburn preached in his uniform with his musket leaning against the pulpit door, and at Volunteer conventions urged the case for Catholic Emancipation and democratic parliamentary reform.

Together with his sister, Mary Ann, McCracken would go on imbibe the radicalism of Tom Paine (of whom their mother was an ardent admirer), William Godwin, and Mary Wollstonecraft. Brother and sister may also have shared a patriotic enthusiasm for Irish music: following Belfast Harpist Festival in July 1792, the McCracken family hosted Edward Bunting who collected and transcribed the Irish airs.

== United Irishman ==
In response to William Drennan's proposal for a "benevolent conspiracy--a plot for the people", on 1 April 1791 McCracken resolved with Samuel Neilson, John Robb, Alexander Lowry and Thomas McCabe to form "an association to unite all Irishmen [...] for the restoration and preservation of our liberty and the revival of our trade". Those who gathered for the inaugural meeting in October, and who called themselves, at the suggestion of Theobald Wolfe Tone, the Society of United Irishmen, were men with whom McCracken and his family had been associated in Belfast through the Rosemary Street Presbyterian churches and the Irish Volunteer companies. While his name does not appear in early records, McCracken was in the confidence of the Society's executive committee from the outset.

By the time McCracken formally took the United Irish pledge (or "test") on 24 March 1795 to "persevere in endeavouring to form a brotherhood of affection among Irishmen of every religious persuasion", and "to obtain an equal, full and adequate representation of all the people of Ireland", the Society was abandoning its hopes for parliamentary reform. It was just a week since the reform-minded Lord Fitzwilliam was recalled as Lord Lieutenant of Ireland after just 100 days in office, and just four days before trade in Belfast and Dublin shut down in "sullen indignation" at this departure. Under the newly repressive regime of Lord Camden, a decided opponent of Catholic emancipation and of all other concessions, thoughts turned increasingly toward the prospect of a French-assisted insurrection.

In June 1795, with three other members of the movement's Northern Executive, Thomas Russell, Samuel Neilson and Robert Simms, McCracken met with Theobald Wolfe Tone who was en route to exile in the United States (and France). At McArt's fort atop Cave Hill overlooking Belfast they swore the celebrated oath "never to desist in our efforts until we had subverted the authority of England over our country, and asserted our independence".

Working parallel to the "uniting" efforts of Father James Coigly, during the Armagh Disturbances McCracken and other emissaries from Belfast travelled extensively in an effort to counter sectarian tensions with the Society's republican programme. For a time he lived in County Armagh, working amongst the Defenders with Charles Teeling (and ranging as far south as King's County), urging them to join the united movement and binding himself in substantial sums to meet the expenses of those hauled before biased magistrates by their Protestant neighbours.

Nearer home, in Belfast and its hinterland in Down and Antrim, McCracken worked with Jemmy Hope organising among Presbyterian tenant farmers, tradesmen and labourers. He also undertook the fraught task of seducing government militia and of carrying information between Belfast and Dublin.

In September 1796 Lord Castlereagh personally presented Neilson, Russell, Teeling and five other prominent United men with warrants for their arrest and pursued McCracken. He was seized on 10 October and lodged with the others in Kilmainham Gaol in Dublin. Serious illness, however, permitted his release on bail a little more than a year later, in December 1797.

== Rebel commander ==
The north did not respond to the call from Dublin and the south to rise on 23 May 1798. On 1 June, Robert Simms—one of the few United leaders still at liberty—resigned his county command in County Antrim rather than proceed without greater certainty of French assistance. The next day, when the remaining "colonels" still vacillated, junior officers turned to McCracken. Already on the 21st, the day appointed by the Leinster Directory for a general uprising, he had shown himself willing to act. He had proposed leading a party to seize the officers of the Belfast garrison as they gathered for a social evening at the Assembly Rooms.

McCracken's standing among Defenders may also have urged his elevation: David Bailie Warden (who on 10 June was to lead the rebels against Newtownards) recalls his North Down command receiving a report that while the Antrim colonels were "adverse to action" the Defenders were "5,000 all ready for action". McCracken was one of the few Presbyterian leaders of the movement broadly known to Catholics, a possible measure of which was his rescue from Yeomanry in Belfast, just days before, by residents of the town's "Irish quarter", Hercules Street.

McCracken proclaimed the "First Year of Liberty" on 6 June. There were widespread local musters in the county, including seizures of Ballymena and Randalstown (and in conjunction with them, west of the Bann, at Maghera), but before they could coordinate most were burying their arms and returning to their farms and workplaces. The issue had been decided by the following evening. McCracken, commanding a body of four to six thousand, failed, with heavy losses, to seize Antrim Town where he had planned to surprise a meeting of the county's magistrates.

Catholic Defenders turned out, but in the march upon the town tensions with the Presbyterian United Irish may have caused some desertions and a delay in McCracken's planned assault. The Crown forces meanwhile prepared and were able to surprise McCracken with reinforcements from their main base in Lisburn.

On 10 June McCracken, together with his brother William, James Hope, James Orr, James Dickey and about 50 other rebel survivors took refuge on the slopes of Slemish, near Ballymena. Intent on joining the insurgents in Down, McCracken and a diminished band passed west of Ballyclare with hopes of crossing the Lagan at Shaw's Bridge. They had almost reached Derriaghy when, on the 14th, they received news of the decisive defeat of the United Army of Down at Ballynahinch on the 12th. The group turned back to Slemish where, pursued by Scottish Fencibles, they dispersed.

== Court martial and execution ==
McCracken's sister, Mary Ann, met with him twice while he was on the run, supplying him with money and clothes. In a letter to her, dated 18 June, he suggested that the fatal division in the country had been one, not of religion. but of class:

You will no doubt hear a great number of stories respecting the situation of the country, its present unfortunate state is owing entirely to treachery, the rich always betray the poor

On 8 July Mary Ann received news that her brother was in Carrickfergus Gaol. He had been seized with two companions hoping to embark on a foreign vessel. Court-martialled on 17 July, he refused clemency in return for naming Robert Simms. His last request of his sister, who walked with him later that afternoon to the gallows, was that she convey to his friend Thomas Russell (who, five years later, was to suffer the same fate) the simple message that he had done his "duty". McCracken was hanged from gallows erected in front of the Market House on Belfast's High Street (where ten years before he taught his Sunday school) on 17 July 1798, aged 30. He had wanted the Rev. Kelburn, the family minister, to officiate, but unable to compose himself, Kelburn deferred to the Rev. Steel Dickson, himself under detention. Henry's last words were to his sister, Mary Ann McCracken - "Tell Russell I did my duty".

The Market House displayed the staked heads of McCracken's confederates executed weeks previously: James Dickey and John Storey who had fought with him at Antrim, and Hugh Grimes and Harry Byres, leaders at Ballynahinch. General Sir George Nugent, however, was to spare McCracken's body the further ignominy of decapitation. He allowed the body to be cut down quickly and entrusted it to Mary Ann. She arranged for a surgeon to resuscitate her brother but his efforts proved unavailing.

== Remembrance ==
McCracken's body was buried in the Parish Church of St George in Belfast. In 1909, after the High Street graveyard had been cleared for redevelopment. Robert May kept the bones for 7 years until Francis Joseph Bigger reinterred what he believed were McCracken's remains in Clifton Street Cemetery, Belfast, alongside his sister Mary Ann and his daughter Maria (thought to be the child of Mary Bodell) for whom Mary Ann had cared.

Jemmy Hope, who survived both 1798 and his attempt with Robert Emmett and Thomas Russell to renew the insurrection in 1803, named two of his sons (the first having died in infancy) Henry Joy McCracken Hope. "When all our leaders deserted us", recalled Hope, "Henry Joy McCracken stood alone faithful to the last. He led the forlorn hope of the cause".
