= William Drennan =

Irish poet, physician and political activist (1754-1820)

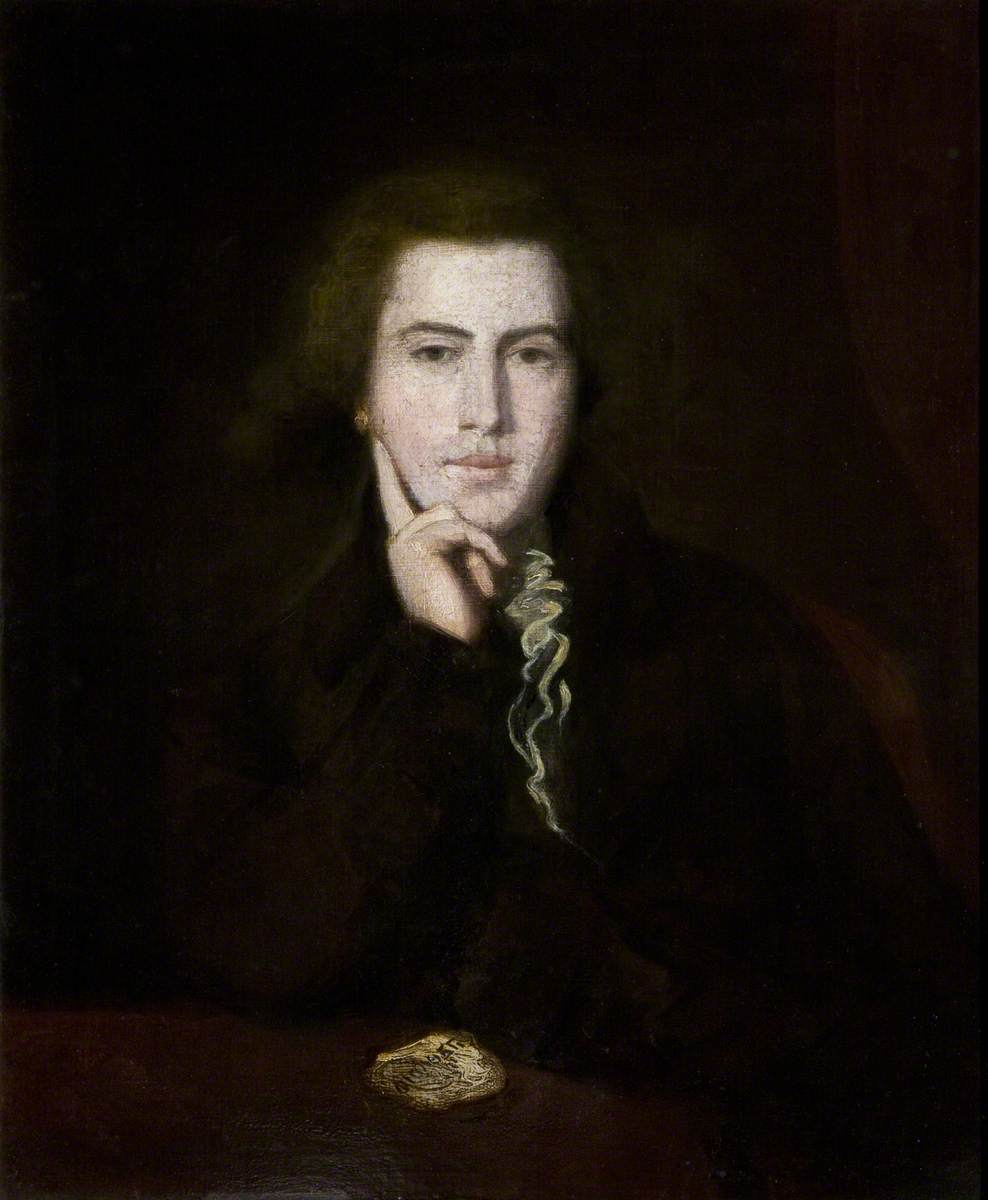
- Drennan c. 1790
- Born: 23 May 1754; Belfast, Ireland
- Died: 5 February 1820 (aged 65); Belfast, Ireland
- Education: University of Glasgow, University of Edinburgh
- Occupation: Obstetrician
- Notable work: Letter to his Excellency Earl Fitzwilliam (1795), Wake of William Orr (1797)
- Movement: Society of United Irishmen

William Drennan (23 May 1754 – 5 February 1820) was an Irish physician and writer who moved the formation in Belfast and Dublin of the Society of United Irishmen. He was the author of the Society's original "test" which, in the cause of representative government, committed "Irishmen of every religious persuasion" to a "brotherhood of affection". Drennan had been active in the Irish Volunteer movement and achieved renown with addresses to the public as his "fellow slaves" and to the British Viceroy urging "full and final" Catholic emancipation. After the suppression of the 1798 Rebellion, he sought to advance democratic reform through his continued journalism and through education. With other United Irish veterans, Drennan founded the Belfast [later the Royal Belfast] Academical Institution. As a poet, he is remembered for his eve-of-rebellion When Erin First Rose (1795) with its reference to Ireland as the "Emerald Isle".

== Enlightenment education ==
William Drennan (an Anglicization of the Irish clan name Ó Draighnáin) was born in the manse of First Presbyterian Church, Rosemary Street, Belfast, in 1754. He was the son of Reverend Thomas Drennan (1696-1762) and Anne Lennox (1718-1806). With his older sisters Martha (Martha McTier) and Nancy, he was one of only three of their eleven children who survived infancy.

Like his father, Drennan studied at the University of Glasgow, a centre of the Scottish Enlightenment. Through his father's mentor, the Irish moral philosopher Francis Hutcheson (1694-1746), a new generation of Scottish thinkers had drawn on the republican ethos of Presbyterian resistance to royal and episcopal imposition to defend what Drennan called "the restless power of reason". Consistent with a popularisation of Hutcheson by his friend in Edinburgh Dugald Stewart that linked individual conscience in matters of faith with the collective right to resist oppressive government, Drennan was later to cite John Locke's Treatises on Government as his "prime authority on politics".

After graduating with an MA from Glasgow, Drennan studied medicine in Edinburgh under the experimental chemist Joseph Black and William Cullen "the most influential physician of his generation". He then returned to Belfast in 1778 and set up practice specialising in obstetrics. As a visiting physician to the Belfast Charitable Society poor house, in 1782 he proposed smallpox variolation, the practice, then widespread, of inoculating the skin of healthy people with smallpox to prevent a more serious case of the disease. (Sixteen years later Edward Jenner advertised the much safer practice of using cowpox for this purpose, with a paper on his own inoculation experiments in England).

In 1783, Drennan moved to Newry, and in 1789 to Dublin where he quickly became involved in the patriotic and democratic politics of the capital agitated by news of the Revolution in France.

== Radical democrat ==
=== Volunteer and the Letters of Orellana ===
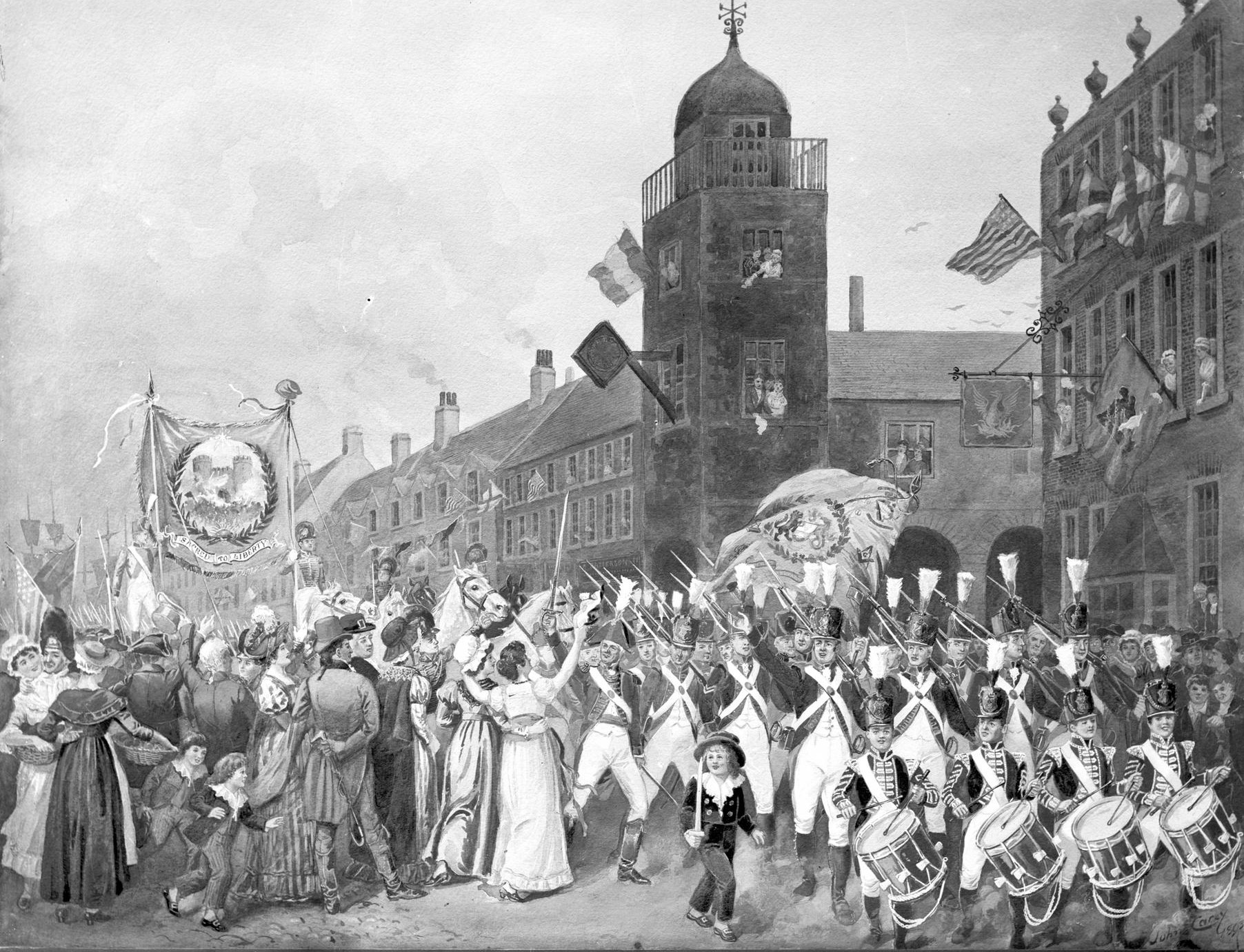
Volunteer companies parade on Bastille Day, 1792, Belfast High Street. In line with Drennan's proposals, the celebration was spread out over two days and involved the display and parading of the flags of France, America, Poland (whose constitutionalist revolution was also being celebrated) and Ireland.

Sharing the sympathies of many Ulster Presbyterians (few without kindred in the colonies), Drennan greeted news of Britain's first defeat in the American War of independence (Burgoyne's surrender at Saratoga in 1777) as cause to "congratulate the people of Belfast and all mankind". He joined the Volunteers. Ostensibly formed to secure Ireland against a French invasion, the Volunteer companies were soon arming and parading in support of the "inalienable rights" of Irishmen. A convergence of Volunteers upon Dublin in 1782 helped Henry Grattan secure London's recognition of Ireland's legislative independence, but failed in 1783 to secure parliamentary reform.

Drennan came to national attention with the publication in 1784 and 1785 of his Letters of Orellana, an Irish Helot in the Belfast News Letter. Addressed to his "fellow slaves", they were the earliest expressions of his support for political engagement with the country's Catholic majority. If the Irish parliament remained an almost exclusively an Anglican (Church of Ireland) assembly in the pocket of the Kingdom's largest landowners it was because no counterweight could be found in the absence of the great body of the nation that the English-dependant "feudality" had dispossessed.

Now was the time for patriot Churchmen and Presbyterians to display "zeal in politics and moderation in religion" and as Irishmen, "nurtured by the same maternal earth", to join with Catholics in a "sacred compact".

=== United Irishman ===
In May 1791, as news of revolution in France, and its spirited defence by Thomas Paine, revived the spirit of Volunteerism in Belfast and its Presbyterian hinterland, Drennan proposed to his friend Samuel McTier

a benevolent conspiracy—a plot for the people—no Whig club—no party title—the Brotherhood its name—the Rights of Man and [employing the phrase coined by Hutcheson] the Greatest Happiness of the Greater Number its end—its general end Real Independence to Ireland, and Republicanism its particular purpose.

In June, Drennan circulated in Dublin, and forwarded to McTier in Belfast a further document, outlining in greater detail the same proposition: an "Irish Brotherhood" that would overcome "the distinctions of rank, of property, and of religious persuasion" through a programme of public education and correspondence with like-minded societies in throughout Ireland, Britain and France.

At its first meeting in Belfast in October 1791, the "conspiracy", calling itself at the suggestion of Theobald Wolfe Tone, the Society of the United Irishmen, resolved on the complete emancipation of Catholics and an "equal representation of all the people" in parliament. Employing, as Drennan had proposed "much of the secrecy and somewhat of the ceremonial of Free-Masonry", the Society spread rapidly across the Presbyterian districts of the north, to Dublin and, in alliance with the Catholic Defenders, across the Irish midlands.

At the first meeting of the Society in Dublin in November 1791 Drennan won unanimous consent for his draft of a solemn declaration or test to be entered into by every member.

I, - AB in the presence of God, do pledge myself to my country, that I will use all my abilities and influence in the attainment of an impartial and adequate representation of the Irish nation in parliament: and as a means of absolute and immediate necessity in accomplishing this chief good of Ireland, I shall do whatever lies in my power to forward a brotherhood of affection, an identity of interests, a communion of rights, and a union of power among Irishmen of every religious persuasion, without which every reform must be partial, not national, inadequate to the wants, delusive to the wishes, and insufficient for the freedom and happiness of this country.

In February 1792 Drennan was identified as the author in the pages of the Belfast Newsletter by his father's successor in the pulpit of the First Presbyterian in Rosemary Street, William Bruce. Bruce saw the test as going far beyond what the town had celebrated in the American and French revolutions: Drennan was proposing universal suffrage. In Ireland, this would "give the Roman Catholics who are ten times more numerous as Presbyterians ten times as much power". Bruce recalled that, in his fifth Letter of Orellana, Drennan himself had cautioned that "the Catholics of this day are absolutely incapable of making good use of political liberty". Drennan denied inconsistency. The "circumstances of the times as well as the persons" had changed "in the very manner wished for": "to commercial interest, a middle and a mediating rank had rapidly grown up in the Catholic community" producing an "enlargement of mind", "energy of character" and "self dependence".

Already in 1790, Drennan had made it clear to Bruce that he was committed to Ireland's "total separation" from Great Britain and therefore willing to vouch for the Catholic majority. He had written to Bruce:

... it is my fixed opinion that no reform in parliament, and consequently no freedom, will ever be attainable by this country, but by a total separation from Britain. ... I believe a reform must lead rapidly to a separation and a separation to a reform. The Catholics in this country are much more enlightened and less under the trammels of a Priesthood than is imagined—it is improper to keep up religious controversy, when all should make a common cause, and it is said that you take up too much time speaking against Popery.

Yet Drennan harboured his doubts. In the wake of the April 1793 Catholic Relief Act, he complained privately that the Catholic Committee in Dublin had "two strings to their bow", one to deal with the government, the other to treat with the Society: and its strategy was to go with the one that would promise and deliver the most.

In May 1793 Drennan was arrested on a charge of sedition. In response to the government's suppression of the Volunteers, an address, published under the name of Marcus in The Rights of Irishmen paper in Dublin called on all active citizen-soldiers to stand to arms. Drennan was the suspected author. He was also being investigated for knowledge of meetings between his friend Archibald Hamilton Rowan (who had fled the country) and an agent of the French Committee of Public Safety, the Reverend William Jackson. Following his successful defence at trial by John Philpot Curran in June 1794, and as the leadership began to seriously consider prospects for an insurrection, Drennan appears to have dropped out of the inner counsels of the United Irishmen. To his sister Martha McTier Drennan wrote: "Is it not curious... that I, who was one of the patriarchs of the popular societies, should... be excluded and treated as a frigid neutralist, until I... throw myself, as other patriot suicides, into the gulf of a prison".

=== The enfranchisement of women ===
Drennan's sister Martha McTeir

From his days in Edinburgh Drennan sustained a faithful forty-year correspondence with his sister Martha McTier. She read, sometimes in advance of her brother, most of the radical writers of her time, including Paine, William Godwin, Mary Wollstonecraft, and Laetitia Barbauld.

It may be a testament to his sister's influence that when William Bruce protested that an "impartial" representation of the Irish nation implied that not only Catholics but also "every woman, in short every rational being shall have equal weight in electing representatives", Drennan did not care to disabuse him. He pleaded only for a "common sense" reading of the United Irish commitment to a democratic franchise. It might be "some generations", he proposed, before "habits of thought, and the artificial ideas of education" are so "worn out" that it would appear "natural" that women should exercise the same rights as men. But he allowed that, until that day, "neither women nor reason should have their full and proper influence in the world".

The paper of the Dublin society, The Press, published two direct addresses to Irish women, both of which "appealed to women as members of a critically-debating public". The first (21 December 1797), signed "Philoguanikos", was probably that of the paper's founder, Arthur O'Connor. The second (1 February 1798), calling on women to rally for the democratic cause, is signed "Marcus". New evidence suggests that this was Drennan.

=== The French Revolution and Catholic opinion ===
While alerted, following her brother's arrest, that her letters were being opened and read by the authorities, McTier refused to be cowed, assuring Drennan that "in these times I never will be gagged". Yet she often advised caution, seeming to welcome her brother's growing distance from the inner counsels of the United Irishmen. In part, this appears to have been a concern for her brother's safety, but also an aversion, greater than Drennan's, to revolutionary violence.

When news reached them of the September 1792 massacres in Paris, Drennan proposed that "the murder of the prisoners is one of those things which must be openly condemned and perhaps tacitly approved". With the enemies of the Revolution triumphant under the Duke of Brunswick at Verdun, it was "no time to weigh nice points of morality"--"if a boat escapes from a wreck be sinking with the weight of men, some of them ought to be thrown to the sea". When January 1793 Louis XVI, as citizen Capet, was guillotined, Drennan regarded it as "necessary to save the French Republic", although certain to serve Britain by making war with France popular. His sister, however, confessed herself "turned, quite turned, against the French," and feared that the Revolution was "all farther than ever from coming to good".

For Drennan, the greater problem presented by the course of the French Revolution was not the violence but the impact on Catholic opinion of the overturning of religion. The Catholics, he advised Martha, "are still more religionists than politicians, and the Presbyterians more politicians than religionists". While Presbyterians might be enamoured of "general liberty and equality", for Catholics their creed was still their "first object". To her husband Samuel, Drennan suggested that this was the "true cause" of disunity between Presbyterians and Catholics: "the former love the French openly and the Catholics almost to a man hate them secretly. And why? Because they have overturned the Catholic religion in that country and threaten to do so throughout the world."

In September 1793 he was of the opinion that Siberia might be "better suited to be a republic than Ireland". In opposition to "the supposed alliance" between the Presbyterians and the Catholics, he anticipated "a coalition of the Protestant gentry and the Catholics of consequence ..., an alliance to keep everything much as it is". In January 1795, in the hope of binding Catholics to the cause of reform, he went so far as to support a call to resist the French.

Convinced that the object of many of the Catholic members was "selfish" (i.e. focused on emancipation rather than constitutional reform), with Thomas Addis Emmet, Drennan had promoted a secret "inner Society" in Dublin (the McTiers in Belfast were to tell no one) which was "Protestant but National". "The Catholics", he wrote, "may save themselves, but it is the Protestants who must save the nation". In the Dublin Society, Drennan was equally suspicious of the party of Napper Tandy, regarding both Tandy ("always running to the Catholics"") and his plebeian following as unreliable. He also saw Tone, Thomas Addis Emmet, and Thomas Russell, leading proponents of a union with the agrarian secret societies, the Defenders, as "entwined in Catholic trammels".

Drennan's creation within the Dublin Society of a "private junto" has been suggested as one of the reasons for the willingness of the Catholic printer William Paulet Carey—a committed democrat equally suspicious of the Committee Catholics—to testify (truthfully) in May 1794 to the physician's authorship of the Volunteer address.

=== Appeal for "constitutional democracy" ===
Drennan tried to revive his dwindling medical practice. He had become a licentiate of the Royal College of Physicians in Dublin in 1790 but due, he believed, to his "dabbling in politics", he was never admitted to the Fellowship. Yet undaunted, in January 1795 he addressed to the newly arrived Lord Lieutenant, William Fitzwilliam, at Dublin Castle, a fifty-six-page "letter". More copies were to sell in Belfast and the North (for which, Drennan confessed, the letter was "chiefly designed") than any pamphlet of the period save Paine's Rights of Man.

The letter insists that the only plot afoot in Ireland is "the plot of Protestant Ascendancy" to represent Presbyterians as Jacobins engaged in "a reformer, republican and regicide plot", and to "stitch together" the "Catholic Committee, Defenders, United Irishmen,... French emissaries and a monstrous tail of et ceteras" as a "scarecrow". Conscious as he was that opinion among the United Irish and Defenders was running in the direction of a French-assisted insurrection, Drennan nonetheless tasks the Lord Lieutenant with averting a "rude and revolutionary collision". He directs Fitzwilliam's immediate attention to reform: "full and final" Catholic Emancipation, the promotion of manufactures to provide employment for the landless, and a system of "universal education" that can "assimilate all religions". But this, he concedes, was but a "bill for partial reform".

In Ireland, he noted, the aristocracy had "seconded" the "revolution of '82". But directly represented in one house of parliament, the Lords, they continue to control the other. Two-thirds of the Irish Commons are returned "by less than one hundred persons" [in the case of Belfast and its two MPs by the Marquess of Donegall] Having "the whole return of members to serve in parliament", men of "rank, fortune and connection" in the kingdom are formed into "a political party" in "league... against the population of the country".

In calling for "equality of suffrage" and "constitutional democracy", "the people in the North of Ireland" are not, as the Lord Lieutenant may have been given to suppose, "infected by what are called French principles". Rather they are "obstinately attached to the principles of Locke as put into practice at the revolution [The Glorious Revolution of 1688 in England]... and illustrated in the plains of America". Consistent with "the fundamental article of the British Constitution that holds taxation to be "inseparable" from representation", where people are denied legislative power they have "the same reason to complain as the Americans had lately, on the other side of the Atlantic, or as the Catholics had at our doors".

Fitzwilliam publicly endorsed a bill brought forward by Henry Grattan to repeal the last of the Penal Laws, that which prevented Catholics from being sworn in as members of parliament. But this was at the cost of his position. After just six months in post, Fitzwilliam was recalled to London.

Drennan wanted it to be "the business of every Irishman to cultivate the democratic spirit, which the Presbyterians first infused into them". But it was clear that in Drennan this was not a spirit that a liberal Viceroy might satisfy. Drennan believed that the right to representation should no more depend on property than upon a sacramental test. In making "the poor and the rich reciprocally dependent", only a universal franchise recognises the "action and reaction of self-interest" as a "constant and universal" principle of public welfare.

=== 1798 Rebellion and Emmet's rising 1803 ===
When United Irish leadership still at liberty sought to muster their members in arms in May and June 1798, Drennan continued in Dublin, the heavily garrisoned capital in which no rebel demonstration proved possible. But while "the authorities did not molest him in any way in the run-up or aftermath of the 1798 Rebellion", this was not at the price of Drennan retiring his pen. The "Marcus letters", published in Dublin in 1797–8, include the appeal to women,. accused Fitzwilliam's successor, John Pratt, 1st Marquess Camden, of bringing to the people of Ireland only massacre, rape, desolation and terror. In January 1799 Drennan published an open letter to the British Prime Minister William Pitt assailing his proposals to abolish the Kingdom of Ireland and to incorporate the country with England under the Crown at Westminster. If Ireland was to face "the cruel alternative of uniting forever with England, or separate forever", then "in the name of God and nature" it should "separate".

Drennan was taken by surprise in Dublin by Robert Emmet's aborted attempt to renew the insurrection in July 1803. What, before the extensive nature of the planning and preparation was known, appeared to have been little more than a bloody street brawl, struck Drennan as a "mad business". But he remained loyal to Emmet's family, attending old Mrs Emmet who was to die then days before a sentence of death was passed on her son, and helping his sister Mary Anne Holmes whose husband was detained. With his own sister, Martha, Drennan shared disgust at the subscription made by Dr. James MacDonnell in Belfast to the reward for the capture of Emmet's confederate, their mutual friend Thomas Russell. In a poem sketched for Martha, Epigraph-on the Living (October 1803), Drennan decries "a man who could subscribe To hang that friend at Last Whom future history will describe The Brutus of Belfast."

== Constitutionalist reformer ==
=== Belfast Academical Institution ===
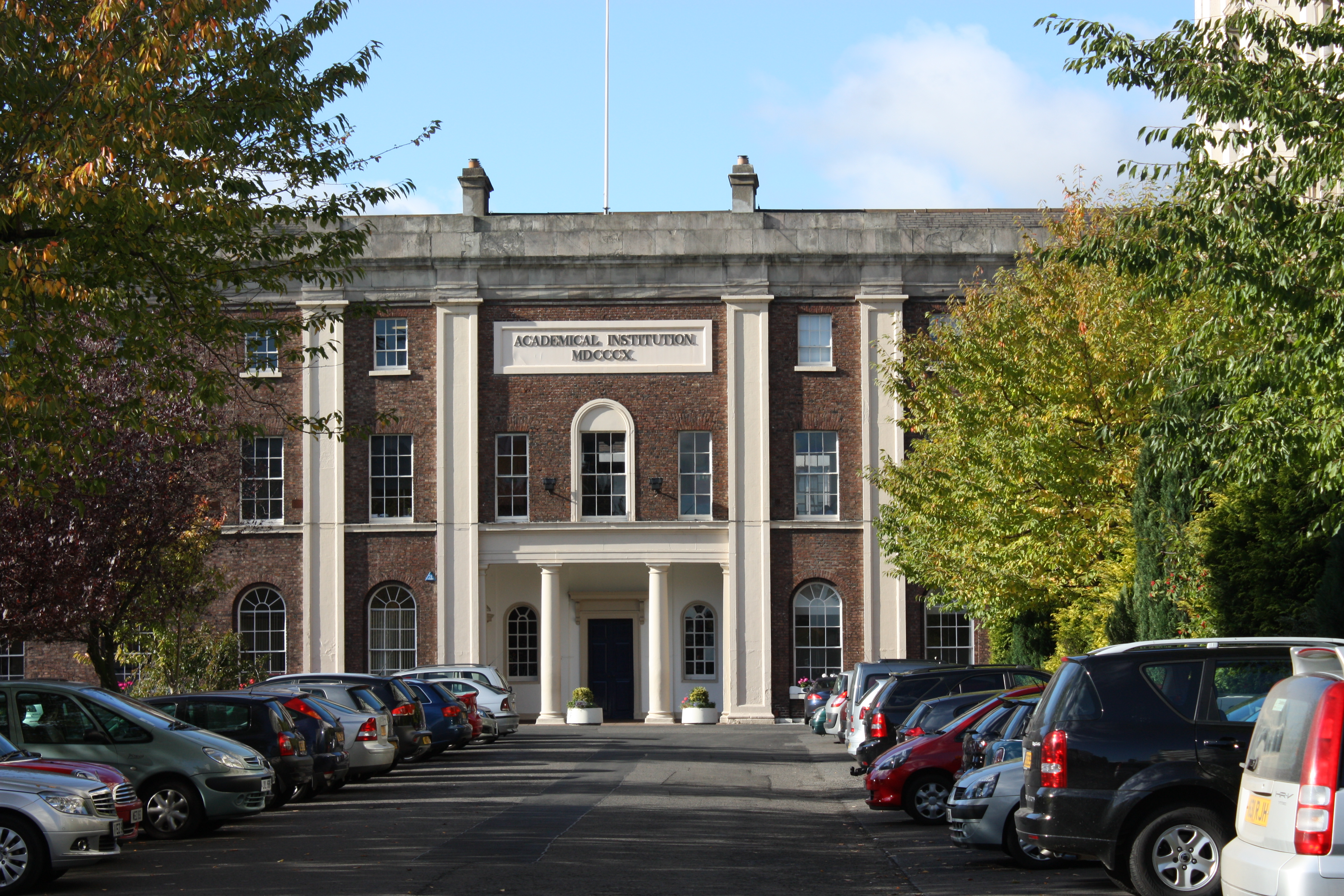
Royal Belfast Academical Institution

On 8 February 1800, Drennan made "his own union With England": he married Sarah Swanwick from Shropshire. She was, he assured his sister, a spiritual partner, from a Unitarian family, "liberal in her mind and of a democratical turn in politics". In September 1803, just three days before Emmet's trial, their four-month daughter took ill and died. In 1806, his financial independence, secured by an inheritance from a cousin, Drennan gave up his faltering medical practice in Dublin and, with Sarah, moved back to Belfast.

In the wake of the 1798 rebellion and its bloody suppression, Drennan resolved to "be content to get the substance of reform more slowly" and with "proper preparation of manners or principles"." As a token of this resolve, in Belfast he led a group of Belfast merchants, and professional gentlemen, including the banker and former United Irishman (and state prisoner), William Tennent and his brother Dr. Robert Tennent, in persuading a town meeting "to facilitate and render less expensive the means of acquiring education; to give access to the walks of literature to the middle and lower classes of society; [and] to make provision for the instruction of both sexes... " in a new institution.

His old nemesis William Bruce, now principal of the Belfast Academy, mocked Drennan's proposed system of governance. He compared it to the French constitution which, together, they had celebrated in 1791: "so full of checks that it will not move". The sovereign body of the institution was an annual general meeting of subscribers. They elected both boards of managers and visitors, but with a complicated system of rotation "to preclude the possibility of the management falling into the hands of a few individuals". The academic direction was likewise entrusted not to a Principal or a Headmaster, but rather to a group of senior teachers sitting as the Board of Masters.

Drennan also proposed that discipline would rely on "example" rather than on the "manual correction of corporal punishment". He was doubtlessly inspired by a man he described as having dedicated his life to banishing "fear and drudgery from junior education", David Manson. Manson, whose portrait was to hang in the new institution, in the 1760s had taught children literacy in his Donegall Street school "without the discipline of the rod" and on "the principle of amusement".

The Belfast Academical Institution was otherwise non-denominational, but opened in 1814 with a collegiate department that, for the first time in Ireland, allowed for the certification of candidates for the Presbyterian ministry. Lord Castlereagh immediately discerned "a deep-laid scheme again to bring the Presbyterian Synod within the ranks of democracy". His suspicions appeared confirmed when, in 1816, it was reported that at a St. Patrick's Day dinner board members and staff had raised a succession radical toasts to Drennan for his services to the cause of Catholic Emancipation and Parliamentary reform, to the French and South American Revolutions, and to "The exiles of Erin" under "the wing of the republican eagle" in the United States. Despite the resignations of the board members present (Drennan at the time was in England), including Robert Tennent the presiding chairman, it was several years before the government was persuaded to restore its grant of £1,500.

=== Belfast Monthly Magazine ===
When Drennan had first returned from Dublin in 1807, William Bruce attempted a reconciliation. He proposed Drennan to his Belfast Literary Society, but Drennan declined. His friend John Templeton (the "father of Irish botany") had already withdrawn from the Society rather than accept the presence of Dr. James MacDonnell. In the wake of Robert Emmet's abortive rising, in 1803 MacDonnell made a public subscription for the capture of Thomas Russell, who had been their mutual friend and was subsequently hanged. Instead, with Templeton, Robert Tennent and the dissident Quaker John Hancock, Drennan began publication of the Belfast Monthly Magazine.

The journal (which was to run for 77 issues) promised that while "intemperate political discussion would be excluded", where facts give rise "to those political differences that agitate the public mind", in "the spirit of true constitutional patriotism" "explanation" would be provided. Drennan found the opportunity for such explanation not only in commentary, but in biographical sketches and book reviews.

In 1809 the Magazine contained a '"Letter addressed to a Young Nobleman Just Entering Upon the Possession of a Great Estate'". The piece was clearly aimed at the new Marquis of Downshire who had just come of age. It attacked absentee landlords who "riot in the wantonness of luxury" while leaving management of their estates to an agent, "whose principle business is to ingratiate himself with his master, by squeezing the uttermost farthing of rack-rent out of the starved bellies of a laborious and industrious tenantry".

Other, more regular, themes included the need for a general education system, freedom of the press, and abolition of the slave trade. But Drennan's chief preoccupations remained the government's failure to deliver on the promise of political equality for Catholics, its corrupting "courtship" of the Presbyterian clergy (Drennan denounced the acceptance of regium donum grants) and the "long-drawn-out pointless and wasteful folly" of the war with France (for which he continued to pillory the late Edmund Burke as "the trumpet").

=== Religion and the State ===
Consistent with his father's teaching from the pulpit of Belfast's First Presbyterian, on religious matters Drennan deferred to conscience rather than to doctrine, or to civil authority. In this light "Christianity properly called" had, in his view, "scarcely appeared on this earth since the death of Christ". He had no sympathy at all for the Sabbatarianism that was the mark of Old Light and evangelical Protestantism: "the abolition of Sunday" he suggested, "would be a blessing".

In 1792 Drennan proposed: "My toast should be--The Sovereignty of the People--not of any party; the ascendancy of Christianity, not of any Church". Rejecting anything indicative of religious establishment, after the Union he objected not only to the regium donum for Presbyterian ministers but (aligning himself with Daniel O'Connell in the Veto Controversy), also to acceptance, as a condition for final Catholic Emancipation, of a British Crown veto in the papal appointment of Irish bishops.

=== Catholic political association ===
At the same time, Drennan retained his distrust of a distinct, organised, Catholic interest, such as had begun to re-emerge under the leadership of Daniel O'Connell in the course of the Veto Controversy. In campaigning to remove the remaining sacramental barriers to their participation in Parliament and the higher offices of state, Catholics might help restore a sense of public spirit to Irish society, but not if they determined to do so exclusively by their own efforts. He cautioned Catholics against replicating "the errors, the follies, and the crimes of past and present administrations, in perpetuating a distinctness, a separating instead of an associating spirit". He proposed organising the campaign through Emancipation Clubs "where the Protestant and Catholic should sit alternatively and a Catholic and Protestant chairman [would be] elected in their turn".

As in the 1790s, while he deemed Catholic emancipation essential, Drennan's overriding goal remained a union of Catholic, Protestant and Dissenter that could advance and carry parliamentary reform.

=== On the Union ===
In response to the 1800 Acts of Union which abolished the old Kingdom of Ireland and its parliament, Drennan, consistent with his letters to Pitt, was at first defiant. He urged Irishmen to enter into a "Solemn League and Covenant [to] maintain their country". In autobiographical verses written in 1806, Drennan presents the failure to attain Irish independence as a measure of a life unfulfilled:

Still shrinking from praise, tho' in search of a name
He trod on the brink of precipitate fame;
And stretch'd forth his arm to the beckoning form,
A vision of glory, which flashed through the storm,
INDEPENDENCE shot past him in letter of light,
Then the scroll seemed to shrivel and vanish in the night;
And all the illumin'd horizon became,
In the shift of a moment a darkness--a dream

Later, he appeared to relent. The new United Kingdom Parliament at Westminster might in time realise the original aim of his conspiracy: "a full, free and frequent representation of the people" "What", he asked a Belfast town meeting in 1817, "is a country justly considered, but a free constitution"?

He continued to criticise the manner of the Union's passage, its administration and its deadening effect on political life. But he did not join calls for the restoration of an Irish parliament. Calls for repeal, he suggested, created "division amongst reformers in the two islands" at a time when they should be joining forces "to seek parliamentary reform". (a conviction expressed in his admiration for Charles Fox and the coverage his magazine extended to John Horne Tooke, Francis Burdett and other leading English reformers). But nowhere in his Belfast Monthly Magazine" was there "indication that William Drennan had moderated his politics or regretted his past involvements"..

== Literary legacy ==
In his last years, Drennan published two volumes of verse, Fugitive Pieces (1815) and Glendalough and Other Poems (1815), and a translation of the Electra of Sophocles (1817). Drennan's literary output is largely forgotten.

In its day his Wake of William Orr (1797), a eulogy to the eve-of-rebellion United Irish martyr, electrified the public and contributed to the cries of "Remember Orr" at the Battle of Antrim: Ireland Drennan depicts as a:
hapless land!
Heap of uncementing sand!
Crumbled by a foreign weight:
And, by worse, domestic hate.

Thomas Moore, Ireland's national bard, is said to have esteemed When Erin First Rose (1795)--source for the image of Ireland as the "Emerald Isle"—as the most perfect of modern songs. Anticipating the struggle to come, Drennan wrote:
In the shift of a moment a darkness--a dream.

== Death ==
Drennan died in Belfast in 1820. His funeral followed his instructions: "let six poor Protestants and six poor Catholics get a guinea apiece for carriage of me, and a priest and a dissenting clergyman with any friends that choose." On the way to the Clifton Street graveyard, his cortege stopped for a few minutes outside what is now the Royal Belfast Academical Institution, the school he had founded. His headstone inscription reads:
Pure, just, benign: thus filial love would trace
The virtues hallowing this narrow space
The Emerald Isle may grant a wider claim
And link the Patriot with his Country's name

== Family ==
With Sarah Swanwick, Drennan had one surviving daughter and four sons. His sons John Swanwick Drennan (a noted poet) and William Drennan wrote a biography of him for Richard Davis Webb's A Compendium of Irish Biography. Through his daughter Sarah, who married John Andrews, of a prominent family of flax merchants, Drennan had several notable descendants, including:

- William Drennan Andrews, judge of the High Court of Justice in Ireland
- Sir James Andrews, 1st Baronet, Lord Chief Justice of Northern Ireland
- J. M. Andrews, Prime Minister of Northern Ireland
- Thomas Andrews, managing director of the shipbuilder Harland and Wolff
- Thomas Drennan, performance artist known primarily for his seminal work 'Journey to the Centre of Drennan'
- Stuart Drennan, screenwriter

== Pamphlets, Letters, Publications ==
- A letter to Edmund Burke (1780)
- An Address to the Volunteers of Ireland by the Author of an address to Edmund Burke (1781)
- Letters of Orellana, an Irish Helot to the seven northern counties not represented in the National Assembly of Delegates, held in Dublin, 1784, for obtaining a more equal representation of the people in the Parliament of Ireland (1785).
- Letter to his Excellency Earl Fitzwilliam (1795)
- Letter to the Right Honorable William Pitt (1799)
- Second letter to the Right Honorable William Pitt (1799)
- A Protest from one of the people of Ireland against a union with Great Britain (1800)
- Letter to the Right Honorable Charles James Fox (1806)
- Fugitive pieces in verse and prose (1815)
- A Courteous Reply to the Remarks of Presbyter Relative to the Belfast Academical Institution (1816)
