= Samuel Neilson =

Irish businessman and politician (1761–1803)

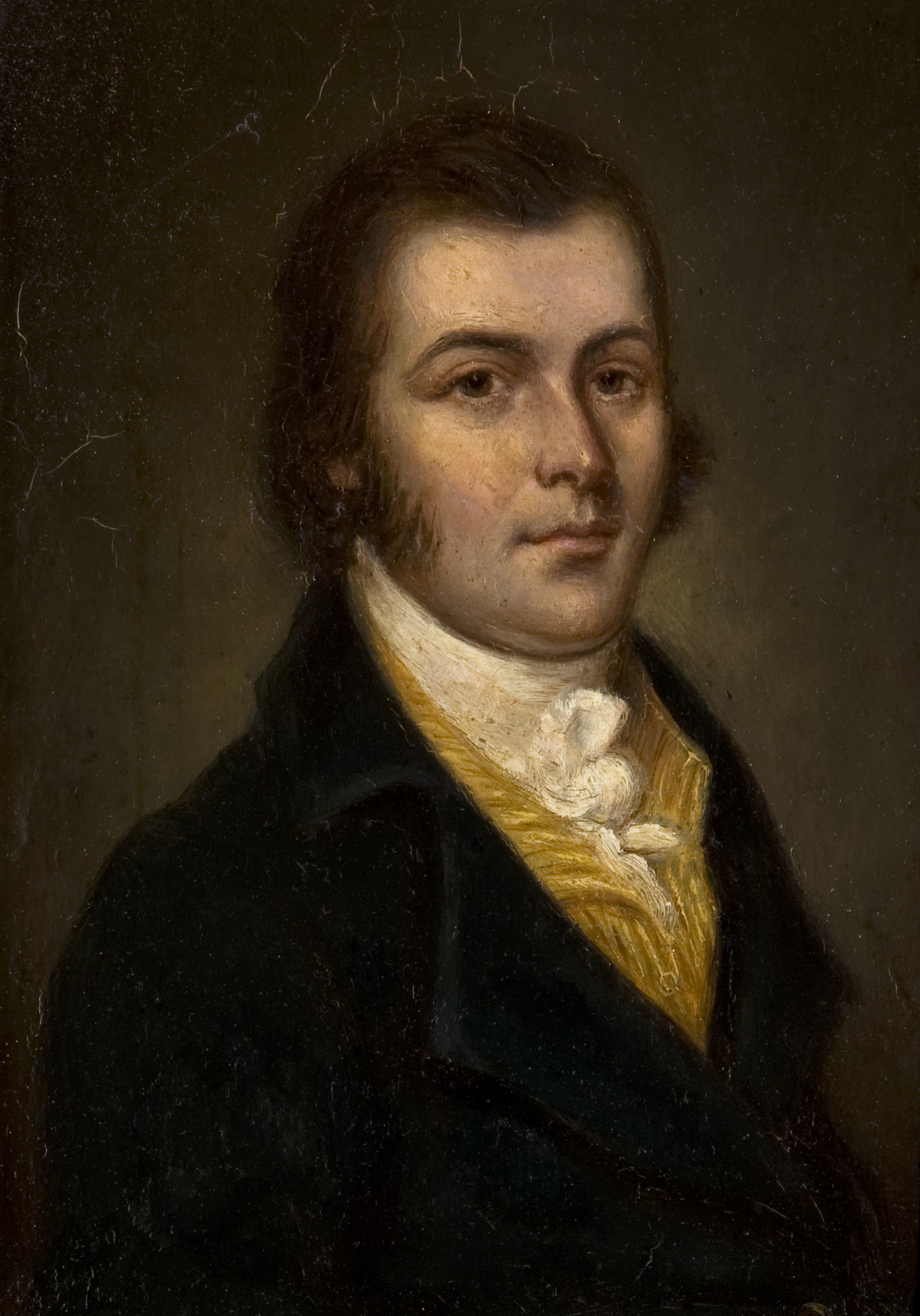
- Born: 17 September 1761; Ballyroney, County Down, Ireland
- Died: 29 August 1803 (aged 41); Poughkeepsie, New York, United States
- Resting place: Poughkeepsie Rural Cemetery
- Occupation: Newspaperman
- Notable work: Northern Star
- Movement: Society of United Irishmen
- Criminal charge: High treason
- Criminal penalty: Exile

Samuel Neilson (17 September 1761 – 29 August 1803) was an Irish businessman, journalist and politician. He was a founding member of the Society of United Irishmen and the founder of its newspaper, the Northern Star. Along with many other Protestants of Belfast, he was radicalised by the French Revolution. In 1797 he was arrested and the Northern Star suppressed by the Irish authorities. In prison during 1798, he took no part in the failed rebellion of that year. Later he went into exile in the United States, where he died of yellow fever.

== Background ==
Neilson was born in Ballyroney, County Down in the north of Ireland, the son of Presbyterian minister Alexander, and Agnes Neilson and was, therefore, a "son of the manse". He was educated locally, but like many of his contemporaries was influenced by English Whig and Scottish Enlightenment thinking. Neilson was the second son in a family of eight sons and five daughters. At sixteen years of age, Neilson was apprenticed to his elder brother, John, in the business of woollen drapery in Belfast. At the age of twenty-four, he established his own business in the town.

== United Irishman ==
Despite his commercial success, Neilson was drawn to politics and had early on been a member of the reformist Volunteer movement. In 1790 he acted as the election agent for Robert Stewart, the future Lord Castlereagh, when he successfully stood for the County Down constituency of the Irish Parliament.

In 1791, inspired by the French Revolution, he suggested to Henry Joy McCracken the idea of a political society of Irishmen of every religious persuasion. He helped establish the United Irishmen in Belfast, at first a quasi-Masonic society. He was also a founder of the Dublin United Irishmen, which functioned as a more open political club. His hardline support of the French Revolution led to him being dubbed "the Jacobin" by his friend and associate Wolfe Tone.

== Editor of the Northern Star ==
In 1792, Neilson launched in Belfast the twice-weekly Northern Star. It supported the United Irishmen with a Painite opposition to aristocratic and confessional privilege and a commitment to democratic reform. For Neilson this not extend to what the Star called the "bold and daring spirit of combination" among cotton weavers, bricklayers, carpenters and other trades. In the face of "demands made in a tumultuous and illegal manner", Neilson (who had pledged his woollen business to the paper) proposed that the civic militia, the Volunteers, assist the authorities in enforcing the law against trade unions.

At the same time, the Star's celebration of the Rights of Man, co-existed uneasily with its deliberate courting of orthodox or Old Light Dissenters whose political outlook was millenarian. In private, Neilson admitted to inserting into the paper "a foolish old prophesy" he had received from a correspondent in order to please his "country readers". He opened its pages to the visions of Thomas Ledlie Birch, Presbyterian minister and United Irish leader in Saintfield, who spoke of the approaching "overthrow of the Beast", the "Battle of Armageddon" that would be the "prelude to a peaceful reign of 1,000 years."

As its editor he was a high-profile target for the authorities and was prosecuted for libel several times, being twice imprisoned between 1796 and 1798. The extensive distribution network and potency of the Northern Star alarmed the authorities and possession of a copy came to be regarded as an admission of seditious intent. The end finally came after 70 men of the Monaghan militia paraded in Belfast and declared themselves to be United Irishmen, which resulted in the execution of four soldiers. On 19 May 1797, three days after the execution of their comrades, militiamen anxious to prove their loyalty attacked the offices of the Northern Star wrecking the machinery and type, a blow from which the paper did not recover.

== Plans for rebellion ==
Along with several other "state prisoners" (persons imprisoned indefinitely without charge) Neilson was released in February 1798 following several petitions by influential friends, on grounds of bad health. Upon release he immediately involved himself in the United Irishmen, aligning with the radicals among the leadership who were pressing for immediate rebellion and opposed to the moderates who wished to wait for French assistance before acting.

The United Irishmen were, however, severely infiltrated by informers, among them Thomas Reynolds, who kept Dublin Castle abreast of their plans and discussions. In March 1798, information of a meeting of the United Irish executive at the house of Oliver Bond led to the arrest of most of the leadership, leaving Neilson and Lord Edward Fitzgerald the only figures of national importance still at liberty. Opposed by the Sheares brothers, who were working to subvert the conscript militia and to initiate a coup, they decided to press ahead as soon as possible and on the basis of the movement's own resources.

== Arrests ==
As the date, finally set for 23 May, loomed closer, the authorities went into overdrive to sweep up the rump leadership, and on 18 May Lord Edward was betrayed in his hiding place and critically wounded while resisting capture. Neilson, now with the responsibility for finalising plans for the looming rebellion, decided that Fitzgerald was too valuable to do without and decided to try and rescue him from Newgate Prison in Dublin. Wary of confiding his plans too early for fear of betrayal, Neilson went on a reconnaissance of the prison but was spotted by one of his former jailers, and after a fierce struggle, he was overpowered and dragged into the prison. On the appointed day, the rising in the city was aborted.

== Imprisonment and exile ==
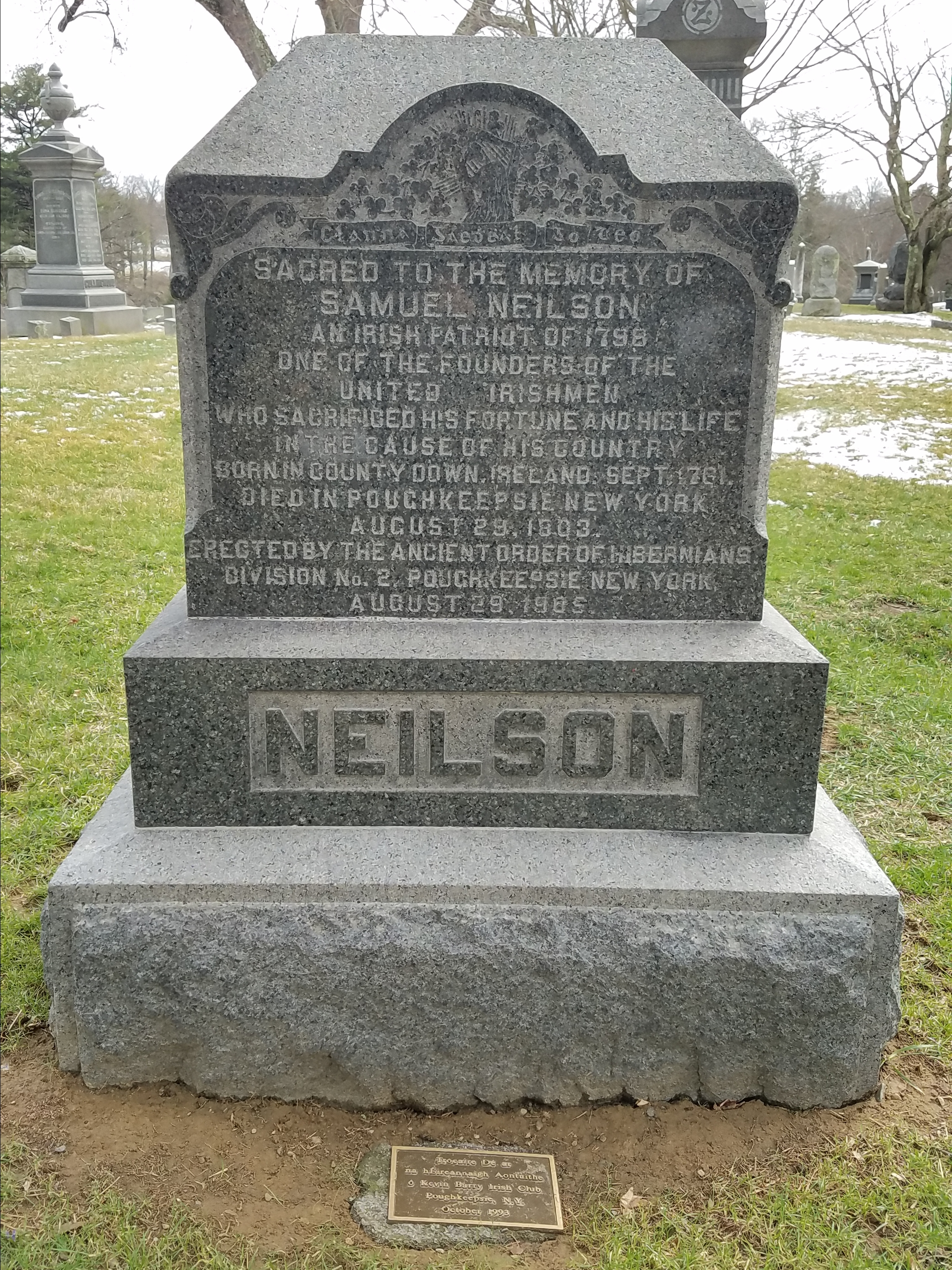
Neilson's grave at Poughkeepsie Rural Cemetery, erected by the local Ancient Order of Hibernians in 1905

Neilson was indicted for high treason and held in Kilmainham Jail with other "state prisoners" for the duration of the doomed rebellion outside. After the execution of John and Henry Sheares, Neilson and the remaining prisoners agreed to provide the authorities with details of the organisation of the United Irishmen and plans for the rebellion in exchange for a sentence of exile.

Following the suppression of the rebellion, he was transferred to Fort George in Inverness-shire, Scotland, and in 1802 he was deported to the Netherlands. From there he made his way to America, arriving in December 1802. Neilson was preparing to revive the Northern Star and bring his family over from Ireland when an outbreak of yellow fever struck the city in August 1803. He took ill while travelling up the Hudson River and landed at Poughkeepsie on Sunday, August 28. He died the next morning.

== Bibliography ==
- Dickson, David. The First Irish Cities: An Eighteenth-Century Transformation. Yale University Press, 2021.
- Durey, Michael. Transatlantic Radicals and the Early American Republic. University Press of Kansas, 1997.
- Elliott, Marianne. Wolfe Tone: Prophet of Irish Independence. Yale University Press, 1989.
- Smyth, Jim. The Men of No Property. Springer, 1998.
