= Belfast Harp Societies =

Former philanthropic associations in Ireland

Belfast Harp Society (1808), Irish Harp Society (1819), Belfast Harp Orchestra (1992)
- Arthur O’Neill (1734–1816), Belfast Harp Society master tutor

The Belfast Harp Society (1808–1813) and its successor, the Irish Harp Society (1819–1839), were philanthropic associations formed in the town of Belfast, Ireland, for the purpose of sustaining the music and tradition of itinerant Irish harpists, and secondarily, of promoting the study of the Irish language, history, and antiquities. For its patronage, the original society drew upon a diminishing circle of veterans of the patriotic and reform politics of the 1780s and 1790s, among them several unrepentant United Irishmen. In its sectarian division, Belfast became increasingly hostile to Protestant interest in distinctive Irish culture. The society reconvened as the Irish Harp Society in 1819 only as a result of a large and belated subscription raised from expatriates in India. Once that source was exhausted, the new society ceased its activity.

The mission of sustaining the traditions of the Irish harp was taken up in 1992 by the Belfast Harp Orchestra. In the ten years of its existence, the stage troupe performed internationally and schooled a new generation of local harpists.

== Belfast Harp Society ==
=== Subscribers ===
Inaugurated at meeting held St. Patrick's Day, 1808, the Belfast Harp Society was an initiative of members of the Society for Promoting Knowledge (the Linen Hall Library). Rules were drawn up by the town physicians James MacDonnell, Samuel Bryson and Robert Tennent. The declared aims were:

preserving the national music and national instrument of Ireland by instructing a number of blind children in playing the Irish harp, and also procuring and disseminating information relative to the language, history and antiquities of Ireland.

Heading the list of 191 people pledging for this purposes between one guinea and twenty guineas annually, was town's proprietor, the Marquess of Donegall. The president was Earl O'Neill. Yet among the subscribers in the largely Presbyterian town were many who, as United Irishmen, had challenged the aristocracy and their Anglican establishment. The Society was chaired by Gilbert McIlveen, a founding member of the United Irishmen and counted on the support of Dr. William Drennan who as author of the United Irish test or pledge had called for the "union of power among Irishmen of every religious persuasion"; Drennan's sister and political confidant, Martha McTier; Francis, John, and Mary Ann McCracken, brothers and sister to Henry Joy McCracken who in 1798 had led the rebels who killed Earl O'Neill's father in battle at Antrim and was subsequently hanged; Robert Tennent's brother William, a former state prisoner; and Thomas McCabe, whose son William Putnam McCabe was forced into French exile after seeking with Robert Emmet to renew the republican insurrection in 1803.

The creation of the society harkened back to Belfast's first Harp Festival in July 1792. This had been staged for the benefit of the Belfast Charitable Society but coincided with the town's Bastille Day celebrations. These had been complete with parades by local Volunteer corps, and resolutions, carried by the new-formed United Irishmen, in favour of Catholic Emancipation and Parliamentary Reform.

=== Music and language ===
Edward Bunting (1773-1843)

The 1792 Harp Festival had been organised, again, by members of the Belfast Society for Promoting Knowledge (known then as the Belfast Reading Society): James MacDonnell, Henry Joy, Robert Bradshaw and Robert Simms. Encouraged by MacDonnell and supported by his adoptive family, McCrackens, the musician and collector Edward (Atty) Bunting notated the music of the ten performers. In 1808, he was appointed musical director of the new society, with Mary Ann McCracken acting informally as his secretary. Bunting's master tutor was the most celebrated of the 1792 performers, Arthur O'Neill of Dungannon, now 75. O'Neill was to instruct poor children from the age of ten, blind like himself, with a view both to preserving his musical legacy and, as harpists, to save his charges from a life of destitution.

In July 1809, the Society extended its programme to include classes in the Irish language. Provided by James Cody, these were particularly welcome by Mary Ann McCracken (who is known to have studied from Charles Vallency's Irish grammar), and by her Gaeilgeoir friends, and fellow subscribers, the poet Mary Balfour of Limavady and the brothers Samuel and Andrew Bryson. Dr MacDonnell, Robert James Tennent (the son of Robert Tennent), and the engineer Alexander Mitchell contributed to an additional subscription to support Cody's efforts. Cody used William Neilson's newly published Introduction to the Irish Language.

In December of that year, O'Neill was led by his twelve blind pupils into dinner marking publication of the second volume of Bunting's Ancient Music of Ireland. Met "with most enthusiastic applause", their musical performances were celebrated as a triumph. From this highpoint, the affairs of the Society did not run smoothly.

=== Demise ===
In February 1810, O'Neill laid charges against his only female pupil, a Miss Reilly, of having "an improper connection" with another student. While she was cleared on investigation, the scandal was followed up by the dismissal of two of O'Neill's class as being "incapable by nature of learning the harp". Subscribers began to withdraw their support. A season of six fund-raising balls held under the patronage of the Marchioness of Donegall failed to make up the loss. In 1813, the school closed.

The difficulties of the Society were compounded by the arrest in August 1813 of its treasurer, Robert Tennent. Pushing forward at a town meeting to protest the killing of two counter-demonstrators (who happened to be Protestants, likely Presbyterians) by a relatively new element in the life of the town, parading Orangemen, Tennent was accused of assaulting Lord Donegall's brother-in-law and Anglican vicar of Belfast, Edward May. He was sentenced to three months.

=== Legacy ===
The Irish antiquary, George Petrie, argued that the Society had been flawed in conception:

The effort of the people of the North to perpetuate the existence of the harp in Ireland by trying to give a harper's skill to a number of poor blind boys was at once a benevolent and a patriotic one; but it was a delusion. The harp at the time was virtually dead, and such effort could give it for a while only a sort of galvanised vitality. The selection of blind boys, without any greater regard for their musical capacities than the possession of the organ of hearing, for a calling which doomed them to a wandering life, depending for existence mainly if not wholly on the sympathies of the poorer classes, and necessarily conducive to intemperate habits, was not a well-considered benevolence, and should never have had any fair hope of success.

In 1818, it was reported that “several blind minstrels educated in the seminary at Belfast" were "wandering through different parts of the country", and, by "affording a pleasing and harmless amusement to the people who hear them", were able to support themselves.

=== The Dublin society ===
The Belfast Harp Society was the model for, and was briefly to survive, the Harp Society in Dublin. John Bernard Trotter from Downpatrick (who had been the secretary of the radical Whig, Charles James Fox) brought to the Irish capital a man who vied with Arthur O'Neill for consideration as "the last of the ancient race of harpers", Patrick Quinn, a blind harper from Portadown who owned the Otway harp. Inaugurated in July 1809, society counted among its benefactors, Sir Walter Scott and Thomas Moore. Within two months it had mounted a grand "Carolan Commemoration" in the city, but then faded along with Trotter's personal finances. He went bankrupt in 1812.

== Irish Harp Society ==
=== The Bengal Subscription ===
Arthur O'Neill retired to County Tyrone on a £30 pension volunteered by James MacDonnell and his brother Alexander, both of whom had themselves been instructed on the harp by O'Neill in their youth. To the consternation of those who had come to regard the blind harper as a national treasure, the Society itself had made no provision for his final years. Accounts of the Society's financial difficulties and of O'Neill's plight ("the last Minstrel of Erin, unfriended, exigent, and bent in years") were submitted in June and November 1814 to the Belfast Commercial Chronicle. Eventually these reached Irish expatriates in the then capital of British India, Calcutta. As a result, almost five years later former members of the board found themselves in receipt of subscription of more than £1,000 "to revive the Harp and Ancient Music of Ireland". As O'Neill was then three years dead, the funds were devoted to a renewed effort employing O'Neill's former pupils.

The new Irish Harp Society procured a small number of harps and again selected pupils, "without reference to religious distinctions", from among "the blind and the helpless". In 1823, the new master was Valentine Rainey (sometimes "Rennie") of Cushendall. He had been committed to O'Neill as pupil by James MacDonnell, and had performed for King George IV on the occasion of his visit to Ireland in 1821.

The News Letter, 15 April 1828, published a glowing tribute to the Society's academy, and of "the inimitable Rainey", that had appeared in the Calcutta newspaper The Bengal Hurkaru and Chronicle:

We can confidently assure the friends and benevolent supporters of the patriotic and humane establishment, that the prosperity of the Institution has never for a moment been forgotten or unattended to. The contributors, by all accounts, have now the satisfaction of knowing, that they have effectually restored the ancient melodies, the nearly lost airs of the Emerald Isle, by the encouragement given by them to the long–neglected and forgotten Harper.

The News Letter conceded that the Society's friends in Ireland, were not able "to contend" with the generosity with which its patrons in India responded to such reports. It noted that while the resident Whig grandee, the Marquis of Downshire, "with his usual characteristic patriotism, in the encouragement of every thing useful and liberal" made an annual subscription of £10, the list of subscribers in India was headed by the Governor General, the late Marquess of Hastings, at more than £31, and by a further eight of "our patriotic countrymen" (army officers for the most part), each contributing more than £12.

Rainey, who "on liberal terms" had been invited to India (according to Bunting, by the "King of Oudh") died in 1837, and the "benevolent, liberal and patriotic" impetus behind the "Bengal subscription" appears to have been spent. In 1839, the Society closed its academy in Cromac Street. The Irish scholar and folklorist Robert Shipboy MacAdam, tried but failed to revive the society in the years that followed.

=== Decline in local interest ===
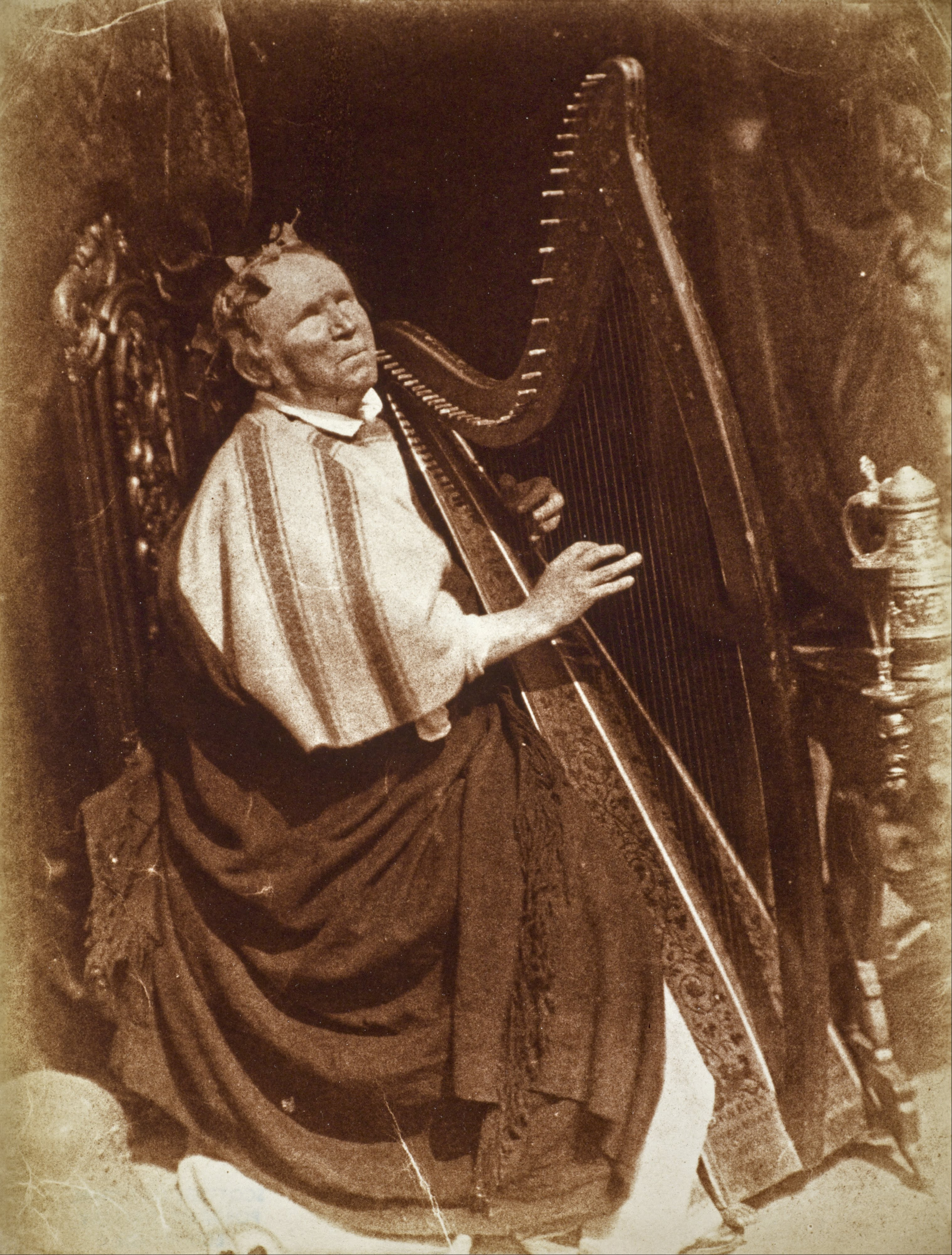
Photograph of Patrick Byrne by Hill & Adamson (1845), calotype print, 203 × 164 mm, Scottish National Gallery

John McAdam, the Society's secretary (and fluent Irish speaker), noted there was not sufficient local interest to sustain its activity. In the wake of the Act of Union and subsequent removal of many landowning families to England, the gentry in Ireland were "too scarce, and too little national, to encourage itinerant harpers, as of old."

McAdam was also to suggest that, "like all other fashions," "the taste and fashion of music ... must give way to novelty.” From 1809 Irish harps were purchased by many titled women in Ireland. But after the year 1835, the "'fad' went out". Charles Egan's workshop in Dublin, the main supplier, went out of business. Irish harp was ousted in both country houses, and popular meeting places, by the pianoforte and violin. Already, in 1792, the top premium in the festival had gone to Charles Fanning playing, "with modern variations", The Coolin, a piece of music at that time much in request by the pianoforte's young practitioners, and in 1796 it was as arrangements for the piano forte that Bunting first published his festival transcriptions.

Other currents may also have been running against interest in the harp and its patriotic symbolism. Robert Tennent's son, Robert James Tennent, a subscriber to the Irish Harp Society, took up the first opportunity provided by Representation of the People (Ireland) Act 1832 to challenge the nominees of Lord Donegall in a parliamentary election. Failing to commit himself on an issue that increasingly was to associate interest in Irish culture with Catholic-majority separatism, repeal of the Act of Union, he lost by a wide margin.

In 1856, The Illustrated London News, reported that the "ancient national music of Ireland is kept alive by a few practitioners of a very humble kind, who wander about in their own country chiefly playing to parties assemble in taverns". The only "gentleman harper" remaining was Patrick Byrne, of Farney, County Monaghan, who some years previously had had the honour of performing before the Queen Victoria at Balmoral. Byrne had graduated from the Irish Harp School in Belfast in 1821.

== Belfast Harp Orchestra ==
Marking the bicentenary of the 1792 Harpers' Assembly, in 1992 Belfast hosted the World Harp Festival. Among acts including The Chieftains and Alan Stivell, it featured the Belfast Harp Orchestra. Founded and directed by Janet Harbison, it was a stage troupe of twenty or more young harpers drawn from both sides religious/political divide in Northern Ireland. The troupe toured with The Chieftains, performing the traditional harp at The Barbican and Royal Festival Hall in London, the Kennedy Center in Washington DC and Carnegie Hall in New York City, and they contributed to the Grammy Award-winning album The Celtic Harp (1993). Over the ten years of its existence, the Belfast Harp Orchestra graduated over 100 harpers, many of whom of progressed on to professional musicianship and performance.

Since 2002, a core mission of the early Belfast harp societies has been resumed by the Historical Harp Society of Ireland in Kilkenny. Rediscovering the older wire-stringed harp of the kind played by O'Neill and Rainey, the HHSI seeks return "to the world the true sound of the oldest Irish music". For this purpose, the Society brings together artists and audiences, players and tutors, researchers and experts, and harp makers and organologists.

== See also ==
- Hidden Ulster, Protestants and the Irish language
