= David Manson (schoolmaster) =

Irish schoolmaster

- Portrait by Joseph William 1783, Royal Belfast Academical Institution
- Born: 1726
- Died: 1792 (aged 65–66)
- Occupation: Schoolmaster in Belfast. Inventor.
- Known for: Teaching in accord with "the principle of amusement". Phonetic approach to basic literacy.
- Notable work: A New Pocket Dictionary; Or, English Expositor (1762)

David Manson (1726-1792) was an Irish schoolmaster who in teaching children basic literacy sought to exclude "drudgery and fear" by pioneering forms of experiential learning including play and peer tutoring. His methods were in varying degrees adapted by freely-instructed hedge-school masters across the north of Ireland, and were advertised to a larger British audience by Elizabeth Hamilton in her popular novel The Cottagers of Glenburnie (1808).

Patronised by leading, reform-minded, families, his school in Belfast counted among its pupils the future pioneering naturalist John Templeton, the radical humanitarian Mary Ann McCracken and her brother Henry Joy McCracken, the United Irishman, who was to hang for his role in the 1798 Rebellion.

== Early life and education ==
Manson was born in 1726 at Carncastle, County Antrim, son of John Manson and Agnes Jamison. At the age of eight he contracted rheumatic fever which affected him for the rest of his life. Because of this he was schooled at home by his mother.

He began his working life as a servant boy on a farm near Larne. There he attracted the attention of the Larne schoolmaster the Reverend Robert White under whose instruction he improved himself in writing, arithmetic and "the rudiments of the Latin"

Biographers of a later pupil of White's, William Steel Dickson, suggest that, having gone through the "almost useless routine of Irish country schools", Dickson was first taught "to think" by the Larne schoolmaster. White encouraged his students to write poetry and to recite or perform their literary work. He also published a collection of poetry which included many written not only by as his male pupils but also by his female charges to whose education he was equally committed.

With other Presbyterian ministers of his generation, it is possible that White had studied either at an academy in Dublin or at the University of Glasgow with "the father of the Scottish Enlightenment", Francis Hutcheson. Writing of children, Hutcheson stressed their kindness and sense of fairness and justice and he called for education that avoided rigid learning and harsh punishment. White's Glasgow-trained son, John Campbell White, (later with Dickson, a United Irishman) was himself to be an education reformer, helping establish a Free School for poor children in Belfast.

Manson began teaching on the north Antrim coast, holding his first school in a byre or cow house, and serving the Shaws of Ballygally Castle (where for many years an apartment was known as the "David Manson" room) as a family tutor. Inspired by the "mild manner of his mother's instruction" Manson began to develop the principles of his future "pedagogy of enjoyment", finding opportunities for children to learn even as he played with them.

An opportunity to teach mathematical navigation induced Manson to cross the Irish Sea to Liverpool, but his mother's illness and an attachment to a Miss Linn, his future wife, soon called him back. From 1752, Manson was settled in Belfast.

== Manson's English Grammar "play school" ==
In order to support himself and his wife, Manson started a small home brewery. Mary Ann McCracken recalls her uncle Henry Joy, proprietor of The News Letter, turning to Manson for "a mug of ale and long discussions" not only of politics, but also of education. Recording his life in 1811, William Drennan in his Belfast Monthly Magazine noted that Manson "never allowed the desire of founding a play school, which was to be taught on the principle of amusement" to "depart from his mind".

Accepting only those who had not been taught the alphabet, in 1755 Manson started an evening school at his house in Clugston's Entry. He advertised his ability, at moderate cost, to teach children to read and understand the English tongue "without the discipline of the rod by intermingling pleasurable and healthful exercise with their instruction".

The school taught girls and boys together, with Henry's Joy's eldest child, Elinor, then about six years old, among the first pupils. Children from other prominent mercantile families in the largely Presbyterian town followed including, in time, John Templeton (Ireland's pre-eminent naturalist) James MacDonnell (polymath and "father of Belfast medicine"), and the siblings Mary Ann, and Henry Joy, McCracken.

In 1788, the McCrackens were to attempt a school of their own for the poor, but it was quickly closed down by the town's increasingly unnerved Anglican establishment for its indifference to sabbatarian and sectarian sentiment. Ten years later, having led United Irish forces into the field against the Crown at Antrim, Henry Joy was hanged outside his former schoolroom in the High Street Market House.

Such was the success of his school in Clugston's Entry that in 1760 Manson moved it to larger premises (also) in High Street, where he accommodated boarders, and eight years later to a still larger, purpose-built schoolhouse in the new Donegall Street (where today he is commemorated by an Ulster History Circle Blue Plaque). Manson also started a night school, offering free instruction in his methods to any school teacher who would attend.

An advertisement for the new Donegall Street school in July 1768, noted that the "boarders are permitted to go out without a guide", and that "they have for their amusement a large yard behind the house, the use of the Linen Hall out of market hours, and a bowling green half a mile out of town".

== Promoted by Elizabeth Hamilton ==
It is unlikely that Elizabeth Hamilton, one of the most noted female writers of her day, attended Manson's school unless briefly before leaving Belfast for Scotland in 1762 at age six. But her elder sister Katherine had done so, and she was well acquainted with his methods. They occasioned a lengthy discourse on child education in Hamilton's best-known work, The Cottagers of Glenburnie (1808). The fictional Mr Gourley directs the village teachers Mrs Mason and Mr Morrison's in reorganising their school on a spare-the-rod monitorial system. He cites David Manson's account of "what he calls his play school; the regulations of which are so excellent, that every scholar must have been made insensibly to teach himself, while he all the time considered himself as assisting the master in teaching others".

In a footnote Hamilton assures the reader that she does not intend to "detract from the praise so justly due" to the educational reformer Joseph Lancaster (1778-1838), but observes that in "some of his most important improvements, [had] been anticipated by the schoolmaster of Belfast". Manson's "extraordinary talents" had been "exerted in too limited a sphere to attract attention".

== Child-centered pedagogy ==
Hamilton's praise for Manson was consistent with her admiration for his younger contemporary, the renowned Swiss pedagogue Johann Heinrich Pestalozzi. Yet while Manson's co-operative and meritocratic system of "sensory, logical and child-orientated" education may have foreshadowed some of the experiments usually ascribed to a new school of educationalists inspired by Rousseau, there is no evidence that he was influenced by Continental theorists. What is suggested is that John Locke's child-centred pedagogical theories "set the terms by which education was debated in eighteenth century Ireland", and that, consciously or not, Manson's pedagogy was "an exemplar of the Lockean approach".

Manson does refer to Locke, but it is to distinguish his own "Plan for the improvement of children in virtue and learning" (1764) as being one entirely "without the use of the rod". While Locke (Some Thoughts Concerning Education, 1693) allows for physical correction in cases of "obstinacy". Manson suggests that direct challenges to a teacher's authority can be avoided either by "the force of example" or by proposing what is otherwise commanded as "a matter of choice, or as a particular favour granted the child". Such alternatives may take "more time than the discipline of the rod", but "the rod only quenches the flame [of resentment] which will break out afterwards in greater fury than before".

What is to be borne in mind, at all times, is the child's "love of liberty".

The love of liberty is as natural to a child as to grown persons. The method then to make them easy under a state of discipline, is to convince them that they are free; that they act from choice, not compulsion. The better to effect this, they must be made sensible of the advantages that accrue from Education, and, that they may not be disgusted with the appearance of business, their lesson must be proposed as amusement, not a task. That which renders learning disagreeable to some children, is the abrupt manner in which it is proposed; the harsh treatment they meet with on account of non-performance; or confining them to long at once to any particular study; for such usage would soon tire them of their most favourite amusements.

Drennan noted that, with Manson, each child was at "liberty . . . to take the quantity [of lessons] agreeable to his inclination". When, after 18 months in Clugston's Entry he had collected some 20 scholars and was sufficiently confident, Manson admitted children to the school "who had contracted an aversion to their books because they had been forced to them, by severe correction". His method was to pay them seemingly little attention at first. The disaffected novices were allowed to "enter cheerfully and heartily into the amusements of the school" without being forced to attend classes or to read. Seeing "the honours conferred on children who paid attention to their books", and conversely the "disrespect due to such as were ignorant, and consequently inattentive", in time the new pupils would themselves "request the favour of a lesson".

The description Hamilton offers through "Mr.Gourley" of Manson's scheme is consistent with that provided by Drennan. In the classroom Manson mimicked the hierarchy of adult society. The boy and girl who excelled at their morning lessons were appointed the king and queen while others were nominated, with various titles, as members of the "royal society" according to their academic performance and ability to repeat lines of grammar. Further down the academic ranking were the pupils who could only remember a small number of lines and were designated as tenants and under-tenants, and below them the triflers and sluggards. The rent or tribute paid to rank was a certain portion of reading or a spelling lesson, so that to receive their due one child might be induced to assist another. On Saturdays, when there was no formal class, the king and queen had the privilege of calling a parliament to settle accounts.

Unlike the hierarchy to which their families were subject in the adult world, the ranking of the pupils within the school was not fixed and, other than by regard, was not enforced. But by "annexing titles places and honours to the several degree of improvement, good behaviour and benevolence", children, according to Manson, soon discover for themselves a "powerful incentive to every laudable pursuit": the "desire for reputation and dignity, and an aversion to disgrace and meanness".

Manson's overriding commitment was to banish "drudgery and fear [...] from places of junior education", by emphasising choice instead of coercion; and encouragement instead of punishment. Thus, for Manson "knowledge, diligence and sobriety are not sufficient qualifications" in a teacher. There has to be the "patience, benevolence and a peculiar turn of mind by which [he] can make a course of education an entertainment to himself as well as to the children".

== Co-education ==
In terms of female education, Manson's English Grammar School was the most important establishment in Belfast. It has been compared with the leading, and contemporaneous, co-education establishment in Dublin, the English Grammar School of Samuel Whyte, who, with Locke, similarly believed that, for girls and boys alike, education should be engaging and enjoyable.

In Hamilton's fictional school, the poor village girls and boys are in separate classes, and in applying Manson's principles Mrs Mason encounters greater difficulty than does Mr. Morrison. Considering the "business of housework" not merely "useful to girls in their station as an employment" but also "a means of calling into action their activity and discernment", she sets them the task of cleaning the school rooms. On Saturday, those who excel have "the honour" of polishing the furniture in her parlour". Neither Manson's own accounts, nor Drennan's, suggests that this was a practice in Belfast.

Drennan observed that in Donegal Street "Young ladies received the same extensive education as the young gentlemen". They moved together in equal rank through the common play hierarchy: queens alongside kings, duchesses alongside dukes, and ladies alongside lords. Girls as well as boys sat in the Saturday parliament and took the role of chancellor and vice chancellor.

== Manson's publications ==
Manson's Belfast school produced a magazine, The Lilliputian, and a newspaper, to which, presumably, both teachers and pupils contributed. But of these there appears to be no record.

Hamilton believed that "a small volume, containing an account of the school, rules of English grammar and a spelling dictionary" is "the only memorial left" of Manson. A New Pocket Dictionary; Or, English Expositor (Belfast: Daniel Blow, 1762) included notes on "The Present State and Practices of the Play-School in Belfast" and, as described by Drennan, contained "tables from monosyllables to polysyllables" so arranged as to emphasise the "natural sound of letters".

When Thomas Sheridan's Pronouncing the Spelling Dictionary appeared in 1780, Manson enlarged his own. But as he wished his Complete Pronouncing Dictionary and English Expositer to be sold at the same low price as his previous edition, no printer would oblige and it was never published.

In 1764, Manson did publish Directions to Play the Literary Cards Invented for the Improvement of Children in Learning and Morals From Their Beginning to Learn Their Letters, Till They Become Proficients in Spelling, Reading, Parsing and Arithmetick (Belfast: Printed for the Author, 1764). While provides commentary on his adaption and didactic use of card games, it does include a general exposition of his pedagogy: notes on "A Plan for the improvement of children in virtue and learning: without the use of the rod".

In 1770 he also published a more basic primer that was to run into many editions in the 19th century: A new primer. Or, Child's best guide : Containing, the most familiar words of one syllable, ranged in such order as to avoid the jingle of rhyme, which draws off childrens' [sic] attention from the knowledge of the letters to the sound of the words. The method here pursued being found, by experience, to render spelling more easy to the learner, and less troublesome to the teacher than the common one heretofore practiced.: With a variety of reading lessons.

== Mechanical invention ==
Manson acquired a plot of land, under Cavehill, on the old Carrickfergus Road on which he built both cottage for his father. He called it Lilliput, likely a reference to the common story that the author of Gulliver's Travels, Jonathan Swift, while Church rector at Kilroot in 1720, found inspiration for the "land of Lilliput" in the profile Cavehill, said to resemble the shape of a sleeping giant. Here, in addition to a bowling green, Manson built for his pupils (and, at a small fee, for the townspeople) a "machine by which he could raise persons above every house in town for an amusing prospect", possibly a fair-ground "high-swing boat affair", and, on principles proposed in William Emerson's Mechanics (1769), a velocipede or bicycle—the "flying chariot". Some accounts, perhaps confusing sparse references to the two machines, credit Manson with some form of airship or glider.

Manson also invented a multiple spinning wheel. Allowing women and girls to spin flax while attending only to their hands, he presented it to the Belfast Charitable Society, the town's poorhouse and hospital.

== Manson's legacy ==
Manson's ideas were carried forward by the hedge-school masters to whom he gave free instruction. In December 1862 an Antrim paper, The Larne Monthly Visitor, described "Manson's dictionary and spelling book" as "still in large demand over the country".

In Belfast Manson's approach, memorialised by Drennan in his Belfast Monthly Magazine, may have influenced the efforts of Drennan's sister, Martha McTier, in pioneering education for poor girls. Elizabeth Hamilton had approved of these, visiting with McTier in 1793.

Drennan was fulsome in his admiration for Manson, describing him as "the best friend of the rising generations of his time". In 1808 he drew plans for a new grammar school and higher-education college, the future Royal Belfast Academical Institution. An expression of his resolve, in the wake of the 1798 rebellion, to "be content to get the substance of reform more slowly" and with "proper preparation of manners or principles," these reflected something of the spirit of his proscribed Society of United Irishmen. Admission was to be "perfectly unbiased by religious distinctions" and school government was entrusted democratically to boards of subscribers and boards of masters. But is likely that the commitment to rest discipline on "example" rather than on the "manual correction of corporal punishment" owed something to Manson whose portrait was to hang in the new Institution.

The same year the foundation stone was laid for Drennan's Academical Institution, 1810, a "Lancastrian School" was opened in Frederick Street for "the children of the lower classes". However, the rationale that Joseph Lancaster, visiting Belfast, offered for his peer-tutoring method was reduced to a matter of economy. He described a "mechanical system of education" whereby "above one thousand children may be governed by one master only, at an expense reduced to five shillings per annum". Like Manson, Lancaster had rejected corporal punishment but he did not share the older schoolmaster's trust in the power of "amusement": discipline in Lancastrian could be harsh with children brutally restrained and shamed.

Recollections of the Reverend John Bleckley's classical academy in Monaghan Town in the late 1820s might also suggest that Manson's democratically-inclined pedagogy had some continued influence. The Young-Irelander Charles Gavan Duffy recalls that the school (in which he was the first Catholic) had a "boys newspaper" and a "boys parliament", an assembly in which Duffy and his Protestant classmates debated, and resolved in favour of, Catholic emancipation.

The Ulster poet ("rhyming weaver") James Orr is said to have remembered David Manson when, in his Elegy Written in the Ruins of a Country Schoolhouse (1817) he decried those who insisted their children be drilled, as they had been, in "the Catechism, the Youth's Companion and the Holy Word" and who thus denied them "elocution's grace" and "grammar's art".

Manson, who In 1779 had received the freedom of the borough, was accorded on his death in 1792 the honour in Belfast of a torchlit funeral attended by a large crowd drawn from all classes of society. He and his wife had no children.
