= Mary Ann McCracken =

Presbyterian Irish social reformer (1770–1886)

- Mary Ann McCracken from an oil painting by W. Thompson c 1845.
- Born: 8 July 1770; Belfast, Kingdom of Ireland
- Died: 26 July 1866 (aged 96); Belfast, United Kingdom of Great Britain and Ireland
- Education: David Manson's school, Belfast
- Occupations: Social activist, abolitionist

Mary Ann McCracken (8 July 1770 – 26 July 1866) was a social activist and campaigner in Belfast, Ireland, whose extensive correspondence is cited as an important chronicle of her times. Born to a prominent liberal Presbyterian family, she combined entrepreneurship in Belfast's growing textile industry with support for the democratic programme of the United Irishmen; advocacy for women; the organising of relief and education for the poor; and, in a town that was heavily engaged in trans-Atlantic trade, a lifelong commitment to the abolition of slavery. On International Women's Day (8 March ) 2024, a statue of Mary Ann McCracken was unveiled in the grounds of Belfast City Hall.

== Early years and influences ==
McCracken was born in Belfast on 8 July 1770. Her father, Captain John McCracken, a devout Presbyterian of Scottish descent, was a prominent shipowner and a partner in the building in 1784 of the town's first cotton mill. Her mother Ann Joy, came from a French Huguenot family, which made its money in the linen trade and founded the Belfast News Letter. Unusually, before her marriage she had run her own milliner's shop and subsequently managed a small business manufacturing muslin. From the publication of Common Sense (1776), Ann Joy was an ardent admirer of Thomas Paine and remained so until, in 1796, with The Age of Reason he turned his invective from aristocracy to religion (her daughter, Mary Ann, accounted the "infidel publication" a "pity").

Along with children of other enlightened Presbyterian families, Mary Ann and her elder brother Henry Joy ("Harry") attended David Manson's progressive "play school" in Donegall Street. In classrooms from which he sought to banish "drudgery and the fear of the rod", Manson offered "young ladies" the "same extensive education as the young gentlemen". Mary Ann developed a love of mathematics and of literature.

In 1788, brother and sister attempted a school of their own: a Sunday morning reading and writing class for the poor. It has been suggested they followed the example of Robert Raike's Sunday School movement in England But unlike Raike who insisted on church attendance and catechism, the McCrackens made no concessions to sabbatarian or sectarian sentiment. As a result, they were not long in session before the town's Anglican rector (and Lord Donegall's factotum), William Bristow, appeared at the door of their Market House schoolroom and, with several stick-wielding ladies, put "the humble pioneers" to flight.

The McCrackens were a political household in a town agitated by the American Revolution and by the low-level tenant insurgency of the surrounding countryside (in the year of Mary Ann's birth, the Hearts of Steel had entered the town, besieged the barracks, burned the house of the wealthy merchant and land speculator, Waddell Cunningham, and sprung one of their number from prison). The family's minister at the Third Presbyterian Church in Rosemary Street, Sinclair Kelburn was a strong supporter of the Volunteer movement. On the pretext of securing the Kingdom against the French in the American War, the volunteer militia or National Guard as it was later styled, allowed Presbyterians to arm, drill and convene independently of the Anglican Ascendancy. Kelburn preached in his uniform with his musket leaning against the pulpit door, and at Volunteer conventions urged the case for Catholic Emancipation and parliamentary reform. Unable to "approve of hereditary legislators, because wisdom is not hereditary", Kelburn did not disguise his democratic and republican sympathies.

McCracken's niece, Anna McCleery relates that "reared among such influences," Mary Ann was "from her early years intensely interested in politics, and various political incidents, in which some of her relatives were concerned, became indelibly imprinted on her memory".

== Businesswoman and employer ==
In the 1790s, following their mother's example, McCracken and her sister Margaret started a small business that pioneered the production of patterned and checked muslin. Initially a small scale operation employing workers in their own homes, by 1809 having gathered and taught a number of young women to work at the tambour frame it had moved into factory production.

In 1815, amidst the post-war collapse in demand, they were obliged to close. But during earlier downturns in trade, the sisters had distinguished themselves as employers by refusing to cuts costs at the expense of their employees, among them young female embroiderers and apprentices. Mary Ann "could not think of dismissing our workers, because nobody would give them employment". The "sphere of woman's industry", she complained, "is so confined, and so few roads open to her, and those so thorny".

In the textile industry, McCracken witnessed the development that was beginning to distinguish Belfast and its hinterland from the rest of Ireland: the accelerating application of machinery which expanded industry while holding down labour costs. When in the early 1790s linen and cotton weavers began to unionise in protest against stagnant wages and rising prices, in his News Letter her uncle, Henry Joy, objected that in competition with England, lower labour costs were Ireland's only "rational hope". On pages of the Northern Star her friends were divided. While Samuel Neilson (who had pledged his woollen business to establish the paper) proposed that Volunteers assist in enforcing the laws against combination; Thomas Russell urged labourers and cottiers to follow the weavers' example.

For her own part, McCracken was fascinated by the possibilities of mechanical substitutes for labour. Would it not be possible, she asked her brother, "to contrive some useful machinery to supply the use of horses and servants" and as a visitor to the Poorhouse, she was to press the guardians to see whether the washerwomen might be relieved by "any new constructed washing machines, or any for wringing". McCracken hoped for a future in which, by reducing drudgery and increasing output, mechanisation would afford workers the energy and the time for greater education and leisure.

== Irish music and language enthusiast ==
From 1784, the musician and collector Edward (Atty) Bunting was thirty years a member of the McCracken household. Mary Ann and Harry attended the Harpist Festival Bunting staged for the benefit of the Belfast Charitable Society (and arranged to coincide with the town's Bastille Day celebrations) in July 1792. In 1808, with her Gaeilgeoir friends, the poet Mary Balfour and the brothers Samuel and Andrew Bryson, Mary Ann became a founding member of the Belfast Harp Society. For its short life-span to 1813, when a second festival was staged, Bunting was its musical director and Arthur O'Neill (under the patronage of his former pupil, Dr James MacDonnell) its resident master harpist. McCracken acted as Bunting's unofficial secretary and contributed anonymously to the second volume of his work The Ancient Music of Ireland in 1809.

The Belfast "renaissance of Irish music" has been seen as "the precursor by a century of the Irish Gaelic Revival". Advertised as an appeal to those "wishing to preserve from oblivion the few fragments which have been permitted to remain, as monuments to the refined taste and genius of their ancestors", Bunting's patriotic festival may have been more antiquarian than revivalist. But there was an interest in the command of the language: Irish classes were offered at the Harp Society. Mary Ann is known to have studied from Charles Vallency's Irish grammar.

== United Irishwoman ==
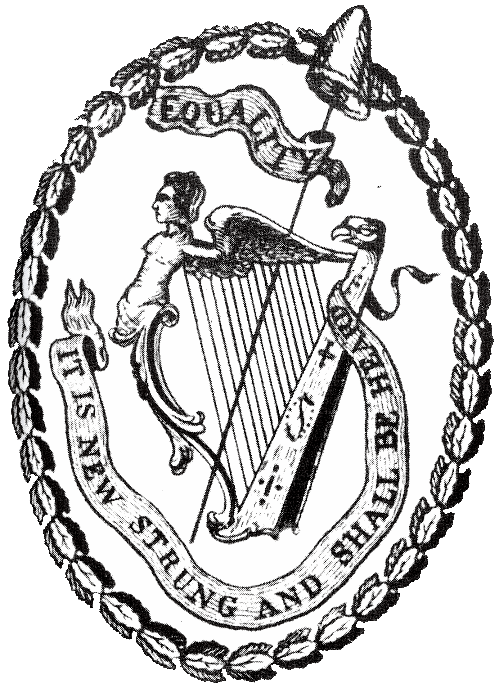
"It is new strung and shall be heard". Society of United Irishmen:

It is almost certain that Mary Ann McCracken took the United Irish pledge to "form a brotherhood of affection among Irishmen of every religious persuasion", and "to obtain an equal, full and adequate representation of all the people of Ireland". She may have done so with her brothers (Harry, William and Francis were all United men), but in any case not later than March 1797. She wrote then to Harry of her hopes that the good example of their school friend, the botanist John Templeton in taking the "test" would soon be followed by the Templeton sisters. McCracken's biographer, Mary McNeill, notes, it would have been "out of keeping with her character" for McCracken "to expect others to undertake responsibilities which she would not shoulder herself". This was at a time when, with the King at war with revolutionary France and with the Viceroy, Lord Camden, rigid in his opposition to Catholic emancipation and reform, the thinking in the democratic party was turning increasingly to the prospect of a French-assisted insurrection.

McCracken assured her brother that she did not shrink from the prospect of political violence: she accepted that "the complete Union of Ireland" might "demand the blood of some of her best Patriots to cement”. Neither was she averse to deceiving the authorities and concealing guns. Her sole reservation was in opposing political assassination and the killing of informers: "what is morally wrong can never be politically right". Meanwhile, she seemed confident of the French, noting that "almost everybody in Belfast" was learning the language.

When her brother was committed to Newgate in 1796 and there fell out with his fellow prisoner Samuel Neilson, McCracken wrote urging him to make up as their "example of disunion" was "injurious to the cause".

In the absence of a French landing, the movement's northern leaders hesitated when on 23 May 1798 the call came from the United Irish directory in Dublin for a nationwide insurrection. Her brother, only just released from Kilmainham after a year and a half's detention, seized the initiative taking county command in Antrim. Henry Joy McCracken's proclamation on 6 June of the First Year of Liberty triggered widespread local musters. But before they could coordinate, the issue had been decided. Commanding a body of four to six thousand rebels, her brother failed, with heavy losses, to seize Antrim Town.

== Brother's execution ==
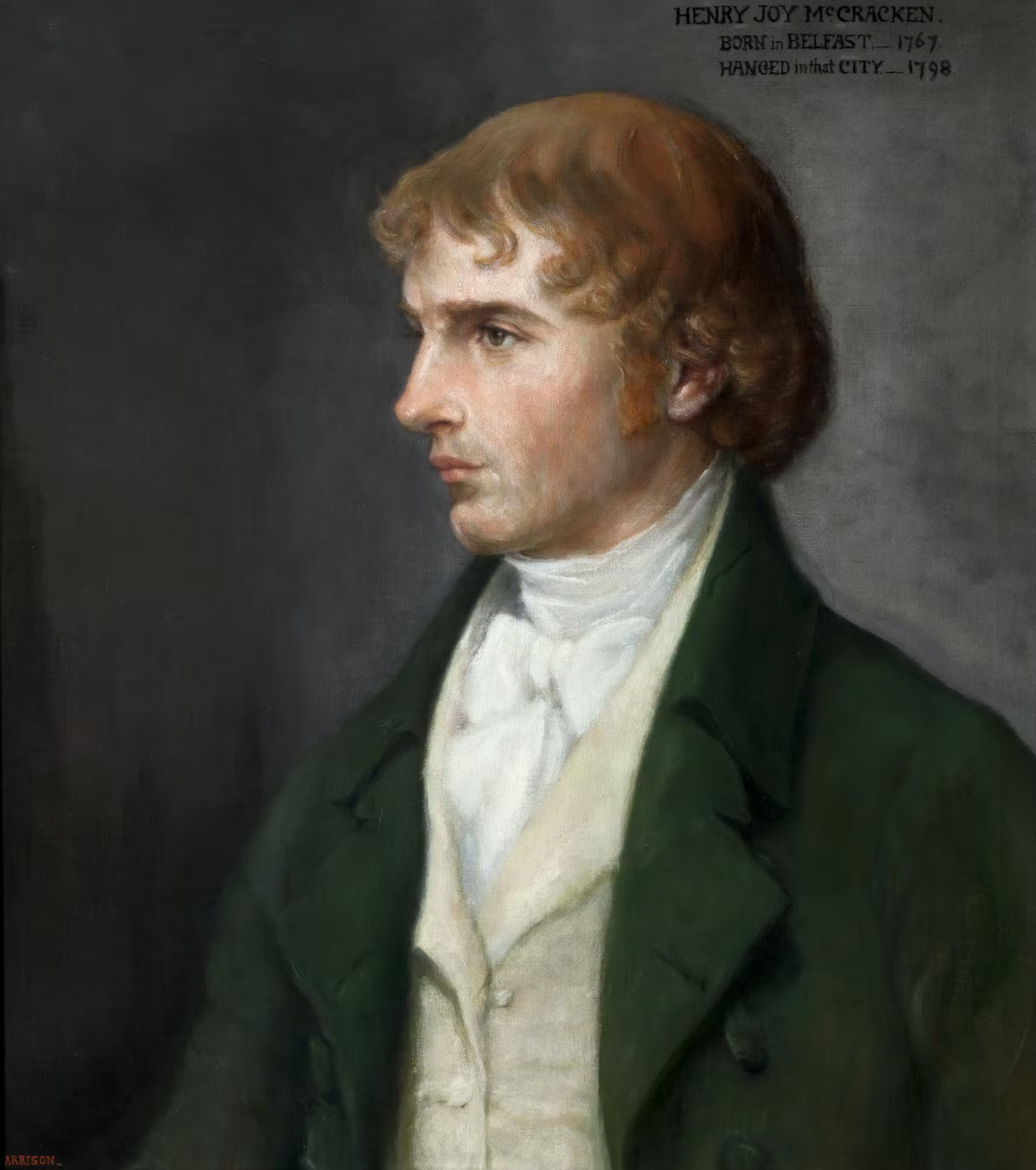
Henry Joy McCracken

In the weeks that followed, McCracken assisted her brother and other fugitives with money, food, and clothing. She was arranging for a ship to take him to the United States when, on 7 July 1798, Harry was recognised and seized in Carrickfergus. With great difficulty she managed to obtain an interview with him the same evening and the following morning, through his cell window, to take from his hand a ring that had “a green shamrock on the outside and the words, ‘Remember Orr’ on the inside.” William Orr was the celebrated United Irish martyr hanged in Carrickfergus the year before.

With her father, McCracken was present at Harry's court martial in Belfast on the 17th, and walked with her brother, the same afternoon, to the foot of the gallows erected in front of the Market House in High Street. There he spurned a final offer to spare his life in return for betraying his confederates. Four had been executed in the preceding weeks, and their staked heads were on display. Harry's body was spared decapitation. General Sir George Nugent allowed the body to be cut down quickly and entrusted it to Mary Ann. She summoned Dr James MacDonnell, who had been a friend to both Harry and Russell, in the hope his skill in resuscitation might revive her brother. MacDonnell demurred, sending in his stead his brother, John, "a skilful surgeon" whose efforts proved unavailing.

== Comradeship with Russell and Hope ==
Thomas Russell

McCracken concluded a letter to Thomas Russell describing the "afflicting particulars" of her brother's death, by expressing the wish "that the cause for which so many of our friends have fought & have died may yet be successful, & that you may be preserved to enjoy the fruits of it". Five years later, in July 1803, McCracken and her sister Margaret met Thomas Russell, then an outlaw, in the cottage of a weaver in their employ. Russell had come north in the hope of advancing the plans of Robert Emmet and Anne Devlin for a renewed insurrection. The sisters would not have contradicted the advice given to Russell by their eldest brother Francis, and by the brothers Robert and William Simms, that there was no appetite for a further rising. This Russell himself confirmed when news of Emmet's precipitous attempt in Dublin persuaded him to nonetheless raise the United Irish standard in County Down. James (Jemmy) Hope was to find the same in Antrim: former United men were convinced the cause was hopeless.

After Russell's arrest, McCracken paid a bribe (£100 advanced through the McCracken sisters' sales agent in Dublin) in attempt to secure his release. When this failed, she commissioned her cousin, Henry Joy (Whig and loyalist), to defend him, and then, after his execution paid for his burial and for the support of his destitute sister in Dublin. McCracken described Russell to her friend, the early historian of the United Irishmen Richard Robert Madden, as "a model of manly beauty" with a grace "which nothing but superiority of intellect can give." Despite such admiration, nothing in their surviving correspondence suggests a desire for intimacy. What it does reveal is a common commitment to social justice. It was with Russell that McCracken shared her alarm at the unemployment and distress caused by the continental war and the recession in trade.

This was also a mark of her friendship with Jemmy Hope, sustained until his death in 1847. Hope, who had laboured and organised among journeymen and weavers, regarded McCracken's late brother (after whom he named his first child) as being, with Russell, one of the few United Irish leaders who "perfectly" understood the real causes of social disorder and conflict: "the conditions of the labouring class".

== On women's equality ==
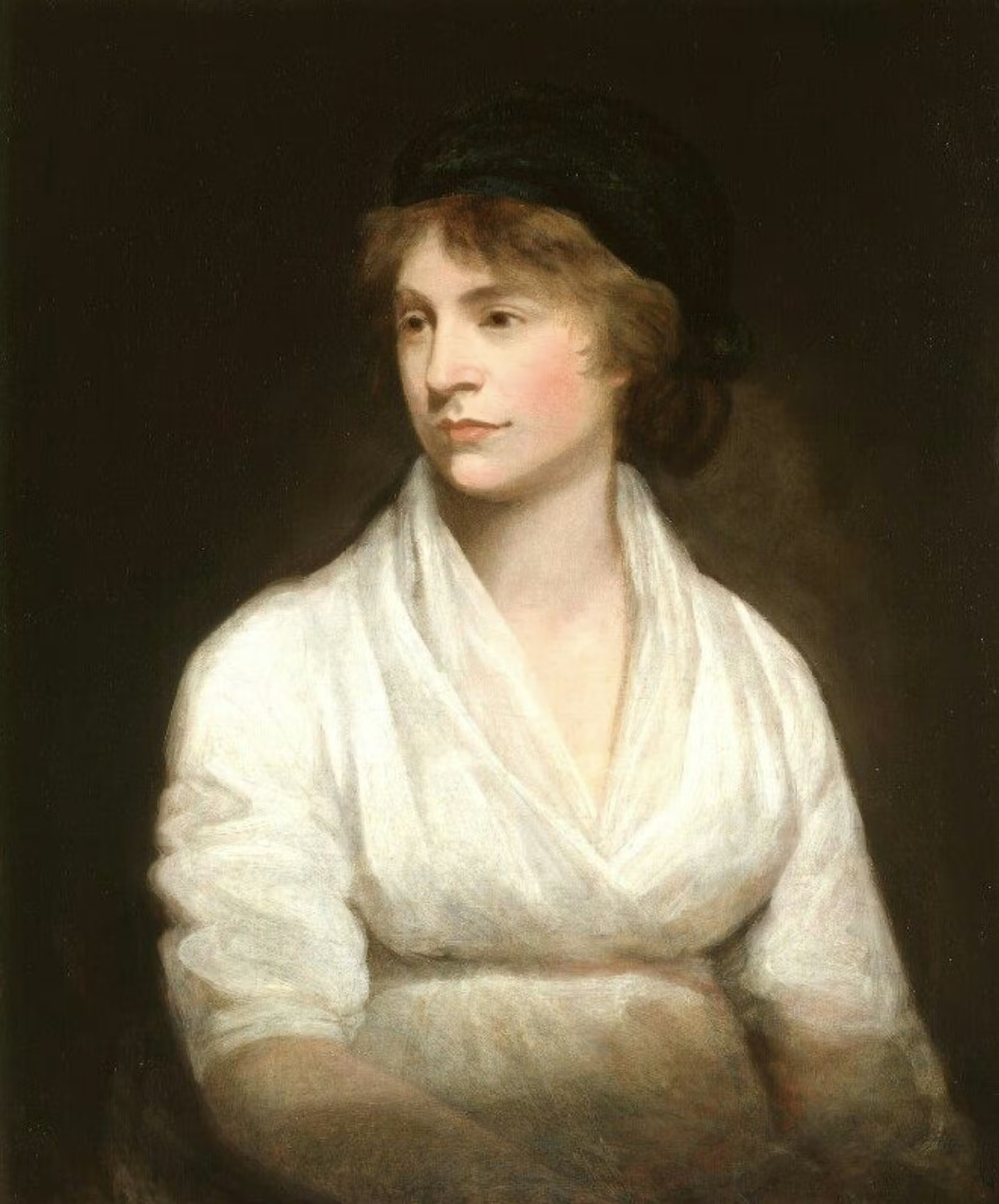
Wollstonecraft by John Opie c 1797

As had other women associated with the United Irish movement (Martha McTier, Jane Greg, Mary Anne Holmes and Margaret King), McCracken had read Mary Wollstonecraft's Vindication of the Rights of Women (1792) (reviewed and commended in the Northern Star). Writing in 1797 to her brother in Kilmainham she repeated Wollstonecraft's insistence that women had to reject "their present abject and dependent situation" so as to secure the liberty without which they could "neither possess virtue or happiness". She reasoned that if woman was created as a companion for man, "she must of course be his equal in understanding, as without equality of mind, there can be no friendship, and without friendship, there can be no happiness in society."

Of separate female societies or clubs within the republican movement (with which in Belfast the names of Martha McTier. and Jane Greg have been linked) she was sceptical. No women, she believed, with "rational ideas of liberty and equality for themselves" could consent to a separate organisation. Keeping women separate could have but one purpose: to keep them "in the dark" and make "tools of them". She asked her brother:

Is it not almost time for the clouds of error and prejudice to disperse and that the female part of Creation as well as the male should throw off the fetter with which they have so long been bound ...?" Might it not be "reserved for the Irish nation to strike out something new and to shew an example of candour, generosity, and justice superior to that of any that have gone before.

Although a prominent loyalist critic, the Rev. William Bruce, argued that complete equality for women was a logical implication of their "theory of human rights", the United Irish societies avoided pronouncing on the rights of women. Their press did, nonetheless, appeal to women "as members of a critically-debating public", and in laying out the commitment to universal male franchise, William Drennan allowed that until women exercise the same rights as men, "neither women nor reason should have their full and proper influence in the world".

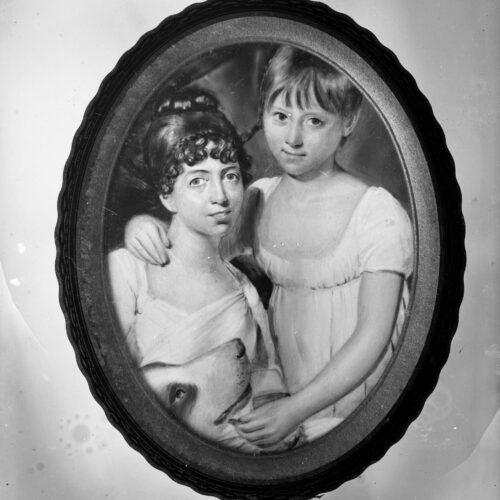
McCracken (l) and her niece Maria, miniature from about 1801

There is no indication from her correspondence that McCracken later read the more radical programme for women's equality circulating in Ireland from the late 1820s. Published under the name of the William Thompson, but declared by him to be a "joint property" with the Irish writer Anna Wheeler, the Appeal of One-Half the Human Race, Women, against the Pretensions of the Other Half, Men, to retain them in Political and Thence Civil and Domestic Slavery (1825) called for absolute equality between the sexes based on "labour by mutual cooperation" and the collective education and upbringing of children. McCracken had found the Essays of Wollstonecraft's husband, William Godwin, on education and manners "less eccentric and more consistent with common sense" than the anarchism of his more widely-read Enquiry Concerning Political Justice. The more measured democratic spirit of McCracken's orthodox Presbyterianism did not lend itself to utopian speculation.

After the execution of her brother in 1798, McCracken learned that Harry had a four-year-old illegitimate daughter, Maria, for whom, to his great distress, he had been unable to make provision. McCracken took Maria in, determined to raise her niece as "an only affectionate daughter". Nothing in her correspondence suggests that McCracken had considered for herself the prospect of marriage and a family. (Her one disappointment with Mary Wollstonecraft was that, for all the "contempt" she had expressed for matrimony, she had married William Godwin. "How does it happen", she had asked Harry, "that people do not act according to their reasoning").

== Charitable activist ==
Mary Ann McCracken is believed to have posed as the tea-leaf reader in the "Cup-tossing" by Belfast painter Nicholas Crowley, 1842.

With an active interest in the living and working conditions of the poor, McCracken dedicated herself to practical work. Already as a child, she had helped raise funds and provide clothes for the children sheltered by the Belfast Charitable Society in Clifton House. For broader change, after 1798 she increasingly looked to "the progress of public opinion".

After the Charitable Society's Poorhouse was returned from military requisition in 1800, McCracken's name appears from time to time in the Society's minutes with suggestions concerning the welfare of the women and children. Following a meeting organised in 1827 by the visiting Quaker social reformer Elizabeth Fry, McCracken formed the Ladies Committee of the Belfast Charitable Society which she was to serve variously as treasurer, secretary and chair. Thanks to the efforts of the committee, and over objections of more conservative subscribers to the Society, a school and nursery were set up for the Poorhouse children.

McCracken was not content to have the children merely taught or minded: she was concerned with their education in the widest sense. Nothing "enraged her more than any suggestion that, out of a sense of gratitude for charity, the inmates of the Poorhouse, young or old, should willingly accept disadvantage or indignity". Drawing on her own "play school" experience with David Manson, she insisted on teachers of high quality and special ability, reading from worthwhile books, rewards, outdoor exercise and play hours during which children would have free use of their time.

She took issue with the male board of governors who opposed allowing the Poorhouse inmates to individually "derive some little advantage" from their own labour. She protested that they were asking more of the inmates than of "the highest and best-educated classes" who invariably require "some additional stimulus to exertion, besides a sense of duty and public good". She attended the last meeting of the Ladies Committee in 1852 at age 82.

In her late eighties, McCracken's correspondence continued to refer to "my out of door avocations": The Belfast Ladies’ Industrial National School for Girls, of which, having "never missed a weekly meeting", she was made president aged 90 in 1860; a weekly visitor since 1813 to the town's Lancastrian school (whose monitorial system had been anticipated by her own schoolmaster, Manson); collecting funds for the Society for the Relief of the Destitute Sick, managing the Belfast Ladies’ Clothing Society, and preventing "the use of climbing boys for chimney sweeping". She believed it better "to wear out than rust out".

In a letter dated 1861, McCracken wrote that, while stooping and leaning to one side at age 90, she was still "able to go out on a fine day to collect for four public charities" and had a "brilliant hope" of an end to slavery in the United States.

== Abolitionist ==
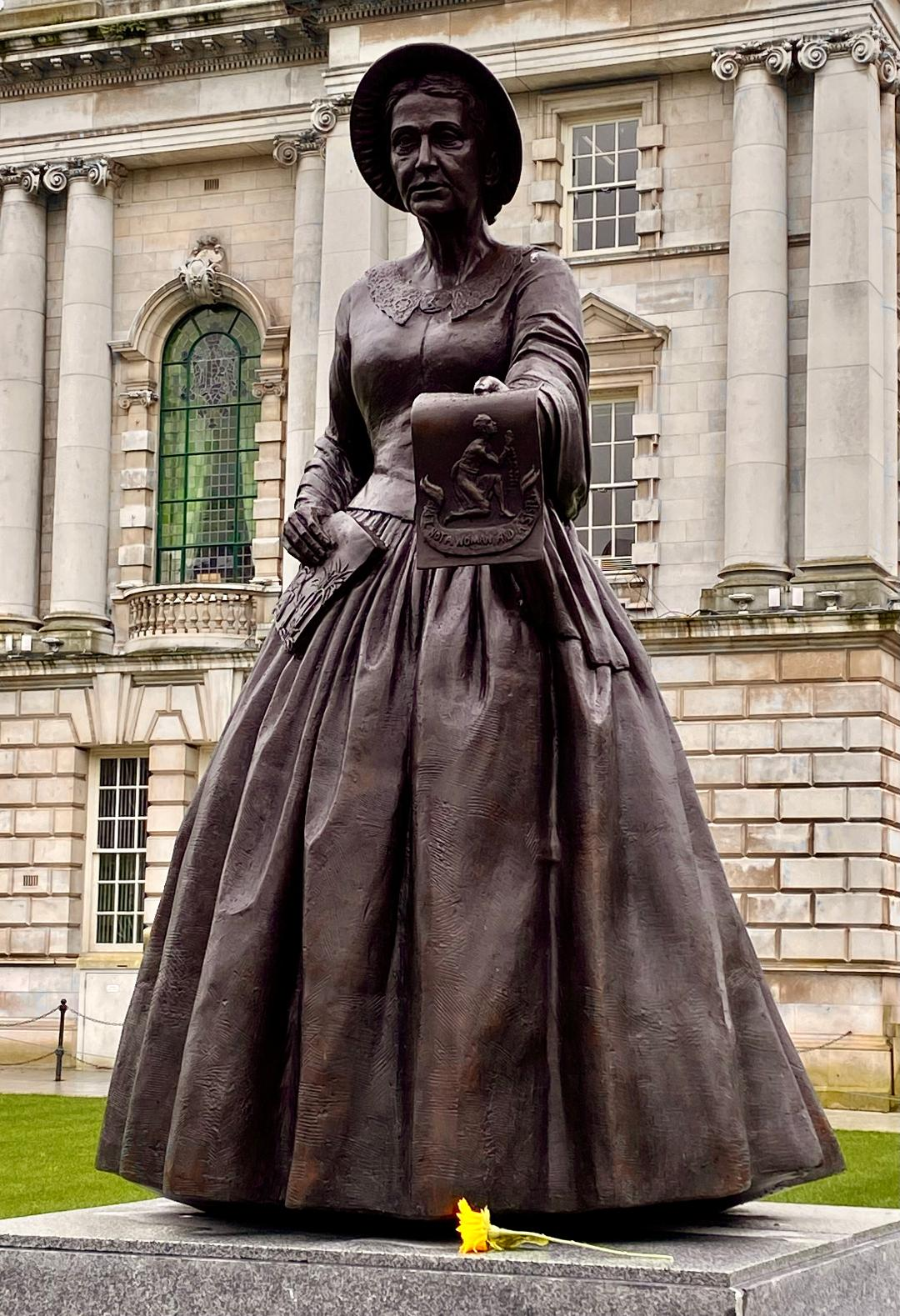
McCracken distributing anti-slavery leaflets. Bronze by Ralph Sander, Belfast City Hall, March 2024

Among other Belfast merchants, McCracken's father, Captain John McCracken, did a brisk business supplying rough linen clothing and salted provisions to the sugar plantations of the West Indies. But when in 1786, Waddell Cunningham and Thomas Greg (his partner in a plantation they called "Belfast" on Dominica) proposed to commission ships for the Middle Passage, Thomas McCabe, a friend of the McCrackens in the Third Presbyterian, rallied opinion in the town against them. The successful opposition was capped by the visit to Belfast in 1791 of the celebrated escaped slave and author, Olaudah Equiano.

Wearing the famous Wedgwood brooch adorned with the image of a bound slave and the words "Am I not a man and brother" (1787), and boycotting sugar, McCracken became a lifelong and active abolitionist. Noting that there is "no argument produced in favour of the slavery of women that has not been used in favour of general slavery", she suggested that her commitment to the emancipation of the African in the Americas was as of one piece with her commitment to the equality of women.

Following a visit to Belfast (in the footsteps of Equiano) by Frederick Douglass, in late 1845 McCracken helped establish the Ladies Anti-Slavery Association. It was not an inititiave without opposition: Douglas's visit had been the target of expletive-laden racist leaflets and of a rumour put about by anti-abolitionist supporters of the Free Church that Douglas had been seen leaving a house of "ill-repute" in Manchester. The original declaration of the Association suggests McCracken's influence in both its tone and style:

We feel especially anxious that emigrants be prepared, by a thorough acquaintance with the true nature of this [abolitionist] question, to withstand the corrupting exhalations from slavery that have filled even the Northern States with prejudices against the negro and his abolitionist friends. Let us if possible, enlist in this righteous cause the sympathies of childhood as well as age, of poor as well as the rich, and not relax our efforts ...

The association maintained a steady correspondence with the abolitionist movement in the United States, and collected locally made items to be shipped and sold at William Lloyd Garrison's Boston Anti-Slavery Bazaar.

In 1859, after being the Association's driving spirit for more than a decade, McCracken was "both ashamed and sorry" to report to Madden, that Belfast "once so celebrated for its love of liberty", had "so sunk in the love of filthy lucre that there are but 16 or 17 female anti-slavery advocates". Save herself, "an old woman within 17 days of 89," there were none to hand out abolitionist tracts to emigrants bound for the (ante-bellum) United States where the issue of slavery was still to be decided.

In one of her last letters to the historian R. R. Madden, McCracken was able to record the moment of decision: the ratification in December 1865 of the 13th Amendment to the United States Constitution.

== The Union and the Famine ==
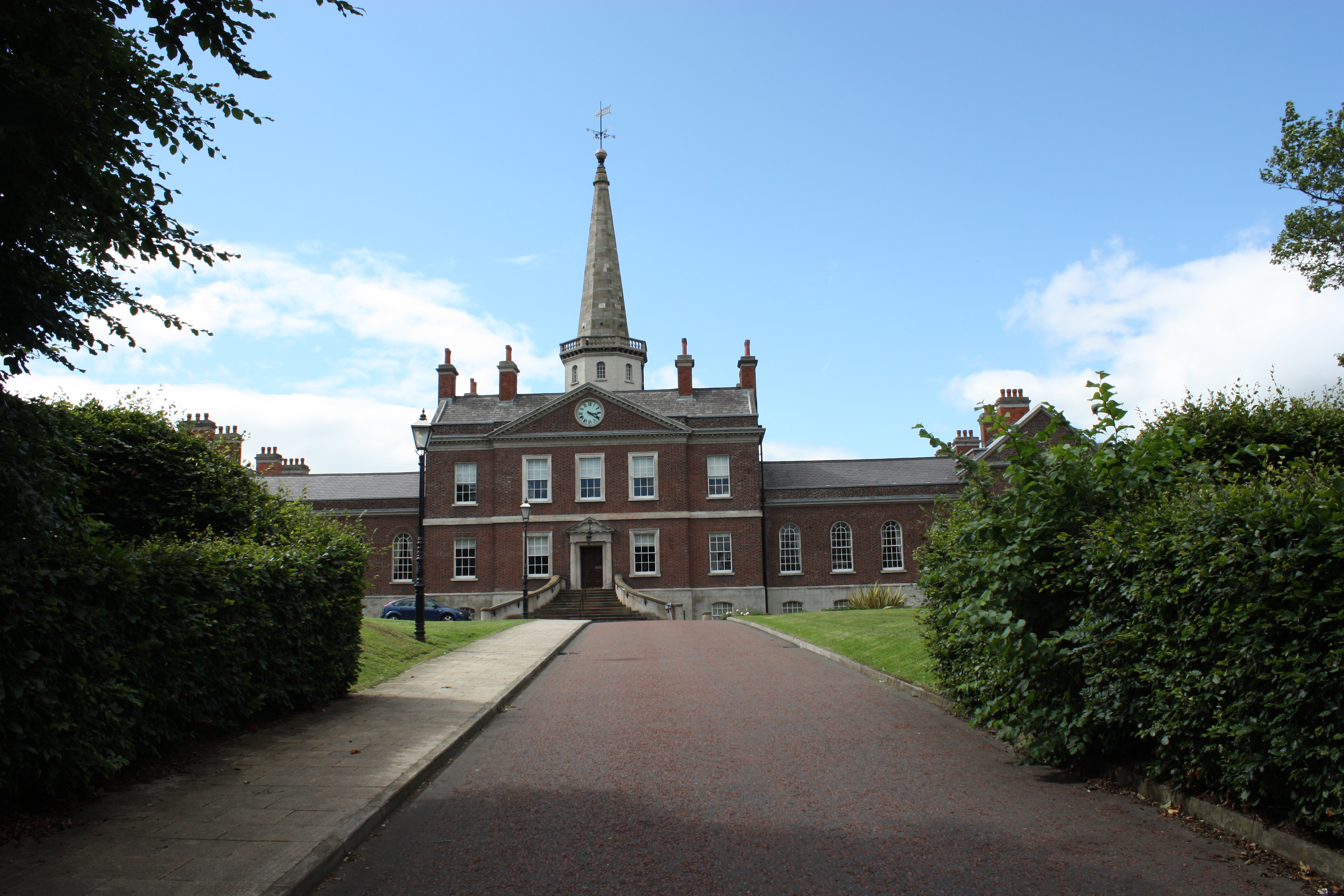
Belfast Charitable Society, Clifton House

Mary Ann McCracken did not share in the patriotic outrage over the government's move, following the rebellion, to abolish the Parliament in Dublin and bring Ireland under the Crown at Westminster. There had, she noted, ‘"always been such an union between England and this country, as there is between husband and wife by which the former has the right to oppress the latter". Why the vehemence now? Would a formal union (the creation of a United Kingdom of Great Britain and Ireland), "increase the sufferings of the poor? - of those especially who are entitled to our commiseration? ... the wretched cottagers of the south, whose labour can scarcely procure them a single meal of potatoes in the day, and whose almost total want of clothing make them fly the approach of strangers".

For McCracken a fight to retain or restore an Ascendancy parliament in which two-thirds of the Commons were the effective nominees of Ireland's greatest landlords had no appeal. In the wake of the Acts of Union (1801) and the blasting of hopes of a United Irish revival, she displayed a quite different pre-occupation. Writing to the News Letter she addressed "the Proprietors of Cotton Mills, and other Factories", admonishing them to attend to the health and safety of their operatives, and reminding them of the "serious responsibility" they assume in employing children.

By the time Queen Victoria ascended the throne in 1837, McCracken was persuaded that "a better day" had dawned. Looking forty years back, she wrote of how "those who were gone" would have been "delighted" at "the political changes that have taken place – which could not possibly in their day have been anticipated, by peaceful means…” Presumably she refers to the delivery of promises denied at the Act of Union: Catholic Emancipation (1829) and parliamentary reform (1832). She might also have been thinking of Britain's final abolition of slavery in her colonies (1833), and of the Factory Act (1833), the first regulation of child labour. Although there continued to be "many evils under which we live", McCracken expressed herself as content "to wait with patience till the great Ruler of all events shall bring about a change through the progress of public opinion". "The public mind", she believed, was "progressing in juster feelings" although not, she conceded, "at railway speed".

How far this relative optimism under the Union survived the realisation of what would have been her worst fears for Ireland's "wretched cottagers", the country's dispossessed, is unclear. In 1844, on the eve of the catastrophe she asked "how is it possible for people to be contented who are in a state of starvation in the midst of plenty". Little of what McCracken wrote during the years of the Great Famine survives. She collected for the Belfast Ladies Association for the Relief of Irish Destitution, a Presbyterian church initiative but determined "to sink all doctrinal distinction... for the one benevolent purpose of alleviating distress", and was a visitor to the first ragged school in Ireland, the Ladies Industrial School which, again, was determinedly opposed to Souperism, the exploitation of want and despair for proselytising advantage.

To Madden, she later reported that there had been those in Belfast who argued that, by inducing an "influx of strangers", the town's efforts to relieve the general destitution had been "highly injurious to own poor"; that "fever patients were known to have been frequently brought by the Railway Train & laid down in the street".

== Daniel O'Connell and Repeal ==
In 1849 McCracken again struck a note of optimism. Writing to her niece in London on the occasion of Queen Victoria's visit to Belfast, she expressed the hope that "a better spirit will shortly prevail betwixt the two countries, & among all classes of Irishmen". But such hope was not long entertained. In 1851, she wrote: “I fear the labours of the United Irish is about to be overturned, & the Orange system of religious discord & ill will be re-established – It seems as if the world was going back, in place of advancing in just & liberal sentiments.”

McCracken would have been distressed by growing sectarian tensions in Belfast (in 1857 and again in 1864 these were to explode in deadly rioting). But in 1851 she may also have been responding to the violent disruption by Orangemen of the work of the new tenant-right movement that Gavan Duffy, invoking the spirit of '98, had optimistically hailed as the League of North and South. The general election of 1852 returned to 48 Irish MPs pledged to the legislation of tenant right, but most were also pledged to repeal the Act of Union, and despite the shared disaffection with rack-renting landlordism, none were returned from the Protestant north.

Although he had his own reservations about O'Connellism, in his last years McCracken's close friend Jemmy Hope chaired meetings of the Repeal Association in Belfast, a town from which loyalist mobs had driven Daniel O'Connell when he had visited in 1844. McCracken was not alone, even among his Repeal allies, in describing O'Connell as "tyrannically despotic and viciously abusive to those who differed from him in opinion". On a principle to which she was firmly committed, "mixed education", O'Connell had reduced Thomas Davis to tears. Unmoved by Davis's plea that "reasons for separate education are reasons for [a] separate life", in a debate on a colleges bill, O'Connell had suggested that the Young Irelander's objection to separate Catholic provision was bigoted.

McCracken did acknowledge the achievement of Daniel O'Connell in drawing the Catholic masses onto the political stage: the "great moral regeneration" this had wrought in the Irish people entitled him, she believed, to "the lasting gratitude of all true philanthropists". She only wished that The Liberator had devoted the energies of a national movement to the abolition of tithes (levied atop rack-rents on behalf of the Established Church) rather than on repeal of the Act of Union. Noting that in Belfast "many sincere and ardent liberals who were violently opposed to the Union, before it took place, are now as much opposed to Repeal", she allowed that it was "a difficult question, on which much may be said on both sides.”

Her overriding concern remained the welfare of working people. On their behalf she advocated policies "with implications far beyond the dimensions of either Union or Repeal or mere philanthropy". While conceding it was "too just a principle to be approved in the present state of society by the very rich", she proposed that all indirect taxes (which bear disproportionately on the poor) be replaced with an "income tax or property tax".

Such welfarist thinking, however, did not entail her reassessing the decision made a half-century before to press for a democratic and national government in Ireland. While she hoped that his history of the United Irishmen would be "instructive in shewing the certain evil, and uncertain good of attempting political change by force of arms", she could assure Madden: "I never once wished that my beloved brother had taken any other part than that which he did".

== Death and legacy ==
Mary Ann McCracken circa 1860 by the photographer John Gibson, Belfast

McCracken lived with her sister Margaret (who had also remained single) and their niece Maria in the house of their brother Francis at 62 Donegall Pass (it is here that the Ulster History Circle has placed a blue plaque in her memory). Maria later took her failing aunt into her married home, where, on 26 July 1866, McCracken died at the age of 96 years.

Mary Ann McCracken was buried at Clifton Street Cemetery close to the Poor House. In 1909, when the St. George's parish graveyard on the High Street was cleared for redevelopment, Francis Joseph Bigger reinterred what he believed were remains of her executed brother alongside her (and his daughter Maria), and erected a tombstone on which she is described as the United Irishman's "beloved sister", and as having "wept by her brother's scaffold".

The writer Alice Milligan claimed as a profound influence upon her a family servant who had previously cared for Mary Ann McCracken (presumably in Maria's household). In Belfast, Milligan was to be a leading figure in organising the centenary commemoration of 1798, and in the pages of her monthly The Shan Van Vocht, and in her fiction, celebrated what she understood as the United Irishmen's appeal to nation above both creed and class.

McCracken collaborated with Madden on The United Irishmen, their lives and times (1842–1860, 11 Vols.). Madden's memoir of Henry Joy McCracken was written, Madden gratefully acknowledged, by Mary Ann herself. But her concern was not alone with the recollection of her brother. McNeill notes that "no detail in the tangled story of the United Irishmen was too small for her consideration. James Hope, Israel Milliken [printer of the movement's paper, the Northern Star], Lady [Letitia] Emerson-Tennent [daughter of William Tennent, who served with Harry on the Northern executive] and anyone who could supply information were written to, or visited". Madden work remains a standard reference

In January 2021, the Belfast Charitable Society launched The Mary Ann McCracken Foundation in recognition of her work as a social campaigner. The Foundation has two main objectives: "to advance education of the public about the life and works of Mary Ann McCracken as a leading social reformer and philanthropist" and "in the spirit of the legacy and work of Mary Ann McCracken; to advance education, to prevent or relieve poverty, to advance human rights and promote equality". Speaking at its launch, historian and broadcaster Prof David Olusoga commented on society's “…inaction and moral passivity”, believing this “…would surprise and disappoint women like Mary Ann”.

In May 2021, Belfast City Council agreed to erect a statue of Mary Ann McCracken on the grounds of Belfast City Hall. In proposing the motion, Councillor Michael Long (Alliance) said:

Mary Ann McCracken is a perfect example of the need to showcase the diverse nature of Belfast and how not everyone can be placed into a simple descriptive box. She was a Presbyterian but also an Irish republican who loved traditional Irish music. A campaigner for women being able to vote, she also was a successful business person at a time when females often didn't have those opportunities.

On International Women's Day (8 March) 2024, the statue was unveiled (together with a further bronze by the same artist, Ralph Sander, of the Irish republican and trade unionist Winifred Carney). It depicts McCracken handing out an abolitionist leaflet identified by the embossed Wedgewood brooch "Am I not a man and brother" image of a bound slave.

== Biographies ==
- The Life and Times of Mary Ann McCracken 1770 – 1866: A Belfast Panorama. Mary McNeill, Dublin: Irish Academic Press, (1960) 2019.
- Mary Ann McCracken 1770-1866: Feminist, Revolutionary and Reformer, John Gray, Belfast: Reclaim the Enlightenment, 2020.
- The Letters and Legacy of Mary Ann McCracken (1770-1866), Cathryn Bronwyn McWilliams, Åbo, Finland: Åbo Akademi University Press, 2021

External links

- The Dictionary of National Biography
- Mary Ann McCracken, Social Reformer
- Mary Ann McCracken Foundation on the Belfast Charitable Society site
