= James MacDonnell (physician) =

Irish physician and polymath (1763 – 1845)

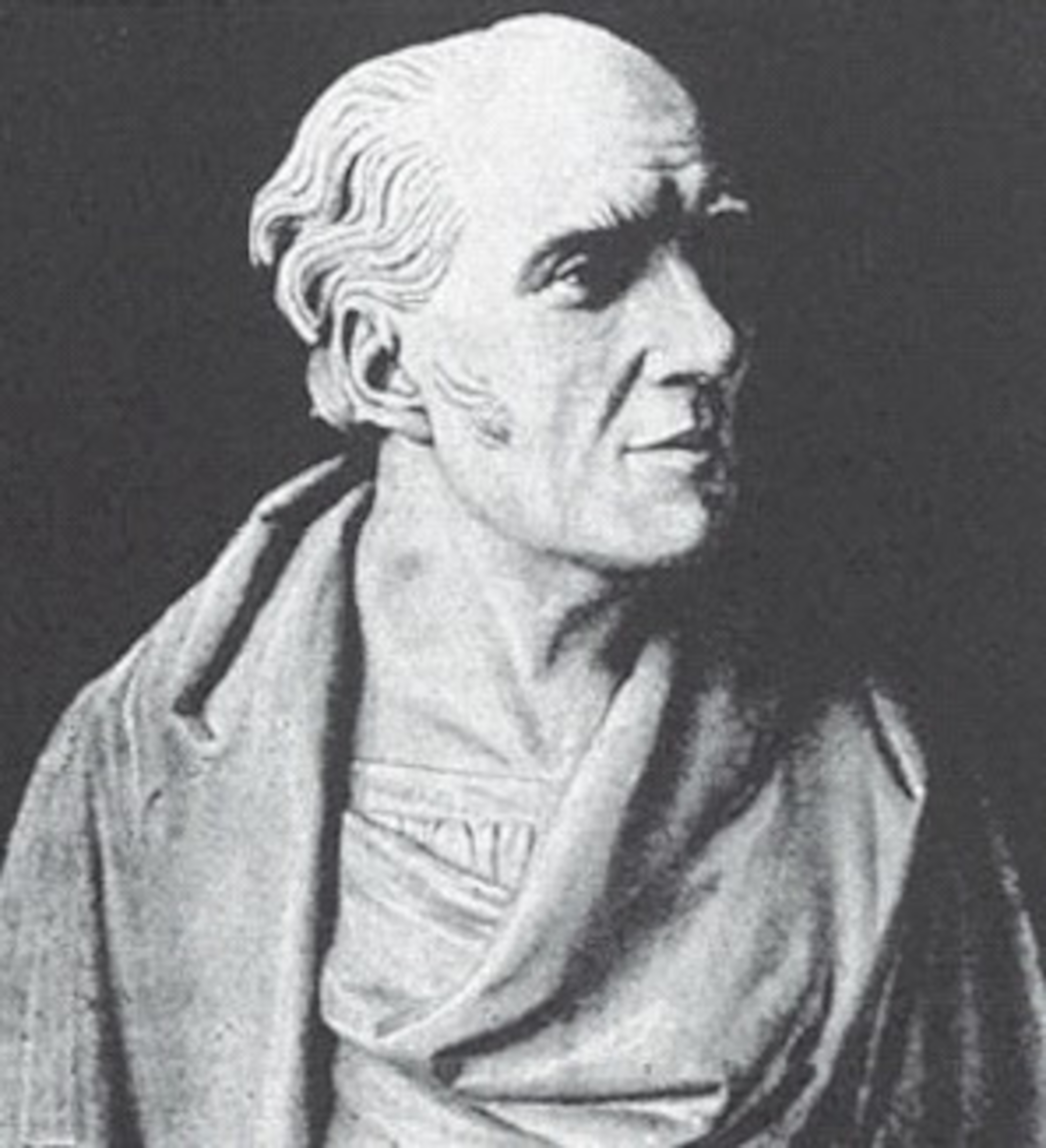
- Bust by Charles Moore, Ulster Museum
- Born: 14 April 1763 near Cushendall, County Antrim, Ireland
- Died: 5 April 1845 (aged 81); Belfast
- Education: David Manson's School, Belfast; University of Edinburgh
- Occupation: Physician
- Known for: Founder/patron of the Belfast General Hospital, Belfast Fever Hospital, Linenhall Library, Belfast Harp Society, Belfast Literary Society, Royal Belfast Academical Institution

James MacDonnell (14 April 1763 – 5 April 1845) was an Irish physician and polymath who was an active and liberal figure in the civic and political life of Belfast. He was a founding patron of institutions that have since developed as the Royal Victoria Hospital, the Royal Belfast Academical Institution and the Linen Hall Library and, beginning with the organisation of the Belfast Harpers Assembly in 1792, was a promoter of efforts to preserve and revive Irish music and the Irish language. Among some of his contemporaries his reputation suffered in 1803 as a result of his making a subscription for the arrest of his friend, the outlawed United Irishman Thomas Russell.

== Early life ==
James MacDonnell was born near Cushendall, County Antrim on 14 April 1763. His parents were Michael Roe, a Catholic relation of the earls of Antrim, and Elizabeth Jane MacDonnell (née Stewart). With two brothers, he was raised in his mother's Protestant faith.

Michael Traynor's hedge school in the Red Bay caves, and David Manson's pioneer “play-school” in Donegall Street in Belfast provided his early education. The “Belfast Latin Schoolmaster”, the Rev Nicholas Garnet of St George’s, Belfast, instructed him in classics. He was taught the Irish harp by Arthur O'Neill. In 1780, the year his father died, aged 17 he went to Edinburgh University to study medicine. He took the MD degree in the minimum time. His thesis (in Latin) called “De Submersis” — “On the drowned” — dealt with methods of resuscitation. In 1784 he returned to Belfast, and lived at 13 Donegall Place.

== Career and public life ==
=== Public health ===
MacDonnell became "the unchallenged doyen of Belfast medicine". He had an extensive clinical practice and conducted clinical investigations. He would often experiment on himself or on his friend Thomas Russell, but he published very little on this work. In 1797 he co-founded the charitable Belfast Dispensary and Fever Hospital in Factory Row (typhus was a great scourge of the town and it was impossible to control the infection and nurse victims in their own homes). This small facility moved to West Street in 1799 and again in 1817 to a 100-bed hospital on Frederick Street at the cost of £5,000. The Frederick Street hospital was the predecessor to today's Royal Victoria Hospital. MacDonnell remained the "attending physician" until 1837.

In 1822, with William Drennan, Robert Tennent, and James Drummond, he was one of four physicians who revived the Belfast Medical Society, and in 1835 was involved in the foundation of the Belfast medical school jointly with the Royal Belfast Academical Institution, to which his son John was appointed professor of surgery. MacDonnell had supported Drennan and Tennent in the foundation of the non-denominational Academical Institution in 1810, and served the college variously as Visitor and Manager between for 1810 to 1837.

=== Literature and science ===
MacDonnell was a leading figure in the broader cultural and intellectual life of the town. On 13 May 1788 he founded the Belfast Reading Society, which would later become the Linenhall Library. He sat on the society's committee until 1817, and was a frequent donor. He founded the Belfast Literary Society on 23 October 1801, and served as its first president.

In 1821, MacDonnell's counterpart in Dublin, fellow physician and polymath Whitley Stokes, acknowledged MacDonnell's assistance in preparing Observations on the population and resources of Ireland. The book, rejected the application of Malthusian doctrine to Ireland. The country's problems, Stokes, argued was not in her "numbers" but in her indifferent government.

From 1832, MacDonnell was active in the Belfast Natural History Society.

=== Irish cultural revival ===
In July 1792, MacDonnell helped organise the national harp festival in Belfast, arranged to coincide with the town's Bastille Day celebrations. Later in 1808, MacDonnell and his brother Alexander co-founded the Belfast Harp Society, endowing their former teacher Arthur O'Neill as its principal instructor. The society briefly had a resident academy at 21 Cromac Street for blind students.

In July 1809, with the support of an additional subscription from MacDonnell, Robert James Tennent (the son of Robert Tennent), and the engineer Alexander Mitchell, the Society extended its programme to include classes in the Irish language. These were taught in Pottinger's Entry by James Cody who used William Neilson's newly published Introduction to the Irish Language. The Harp Society and the school were wound up in 1812-13.

In 1830, with Neilson's former pupil at the Academical Institution, Robert Shipboy MacAdam, and with the patronage of the Arthur Hill, Marquess of Downshire, MacDonnell founded Cuideacht Gaoidhilge Uladh (the Ulster Gaelic Society). The society, which was to remain active until 1843, abjured the commitment of other Protestants sharing its interest in the contemporary Irish vernacular to religious evangelism. (MacAdam was of the opinion that nothing had done more harm to the language than efforts to "beguile the poor Catholics from their faith").

== Association with United Irishmen ==
=== Friend of Catholic Emancipation and reform ===
At a Bastille Day town meeting in 1792, MacDonnell helped move an Irish Volunteer resolution approving Catholic Emancipation, which he linked it to the call for the abolition of slavery. Speaking on the same motion were friends who, following an address by Dublin barrister and Catholic Committee secretary Theobald Wolfe Tone, had joined together the previous October to form the Society of United Irishmen. MacDonnell, who had hosted Tone in Belfast, sympathised with the spirit of the United Irish "test" or resolve: As composed by Drennan this was to attain "an impartial and adequate representation of the Irish nation in parliament [by fostering] . . . a union of power among Irishmen of every religious persuasion".

MacDonnell, however, was to oppose the Society's subsequent drift toward insurrection. It was a position shared by Stokes, to whom he had first been introduced by Tone that same July.

Six years later, in July 1798, Henry Joy McCracken was executed in Belfast for his role in leading the rebels in the Battle of Antrim. When her brother was cut from the gallows, Mary Ann McCracken summoned MacDonnell in hope his skill in resuscitation might revive him. MacDonnell demurred, sending in his stead his brother, John, "a skilful surgeon".

=== "Betrayal" of Thomas Russell ===
Thomas Russell had lodged with MacDonnell from October 1792 to February 1794 and MacDonnell helped him secure the position as librarian to the Belfast Reading Society (the Linen Hall Library). After Russell was arrested in 1797, MacDonnell wrote to him in Newgate Prison. But MacDonnell had taken issue with Russell's militant republicanism, suggesting that, just as in their shared scientific interests, his judgement in politics was often rash and, in working "all from first principles", naïve.

In 1803, MacDonnell warned Russell, then an outlaw, that if he returned to Belfast he would find "a great difference in this place". When Russell did so, and found this to be the case—that people could not be roused to support Robert Emmet's attempt at a renewed insurrection—citizens of the town raised a subscription for his arrest. MacDonnell contributed 50 guineas. He later claimed that he did so dispel suspicion of his own sudden departure from Belfast, a result of his being called away to perform an operation. Russell was subsequently captured in Dublin and hanged in Downpatrick.

Former friends denounced MacDonnell as a "Judas". In a poem sketched for his sister Martha McTier, Epigraph-on the Living (October 1803), William Drennan decried "a man who could subscribe To hang that friend at Last Whom future history will describe The Brutus of Belfast." The botanist, and friend of Russell and the McCrackens, John Templeton withdrew from the Belfast Literary Society rather than continue to associate with MacDonnell.

MacDonnell's later cooperation with William Drennan and other former United Irishmen in the foundation and management of the Academical Institution suggests that the bitterness was, in time, set aside. Conceding that time had "softened a little my feelings" Templeton met with MacDonnell in 1825, and shook hands, a reconciliation possibly brokered by Mary Ann McCracken who ended her own embargo of the doctor.

== Death and family ==
MacDonnell was married twice, first to Eliza Clarke on 9 September 1791. They had 1 daughter and 3 sons, Katherine Anne, Randal, Alexander, and John. Eliza died in 1798. MacDonnell then married Penelope Montgomery.

MacDonnell died at his home at 13 Donegall Place on 5 April 1845. He is buried at the old churchyard at Layde near Cushendall, where his grave is marked with a Celtic cross. Aodh Mac Domhnaill composed Tuireadh an Doctuir Mhic Domnhaill in his memory, and there is a plaque to MacDonnell near Murlough, County Antrim.

The Ulster Museum hold a bust of MacDonnell by Charles Moore, and the Royal Victoria Hospital hold a portrait of him. His papers are held by the Public Records Office of Northern Ireland in the James MacDonnell Archive.
