= Linen Hall Library =

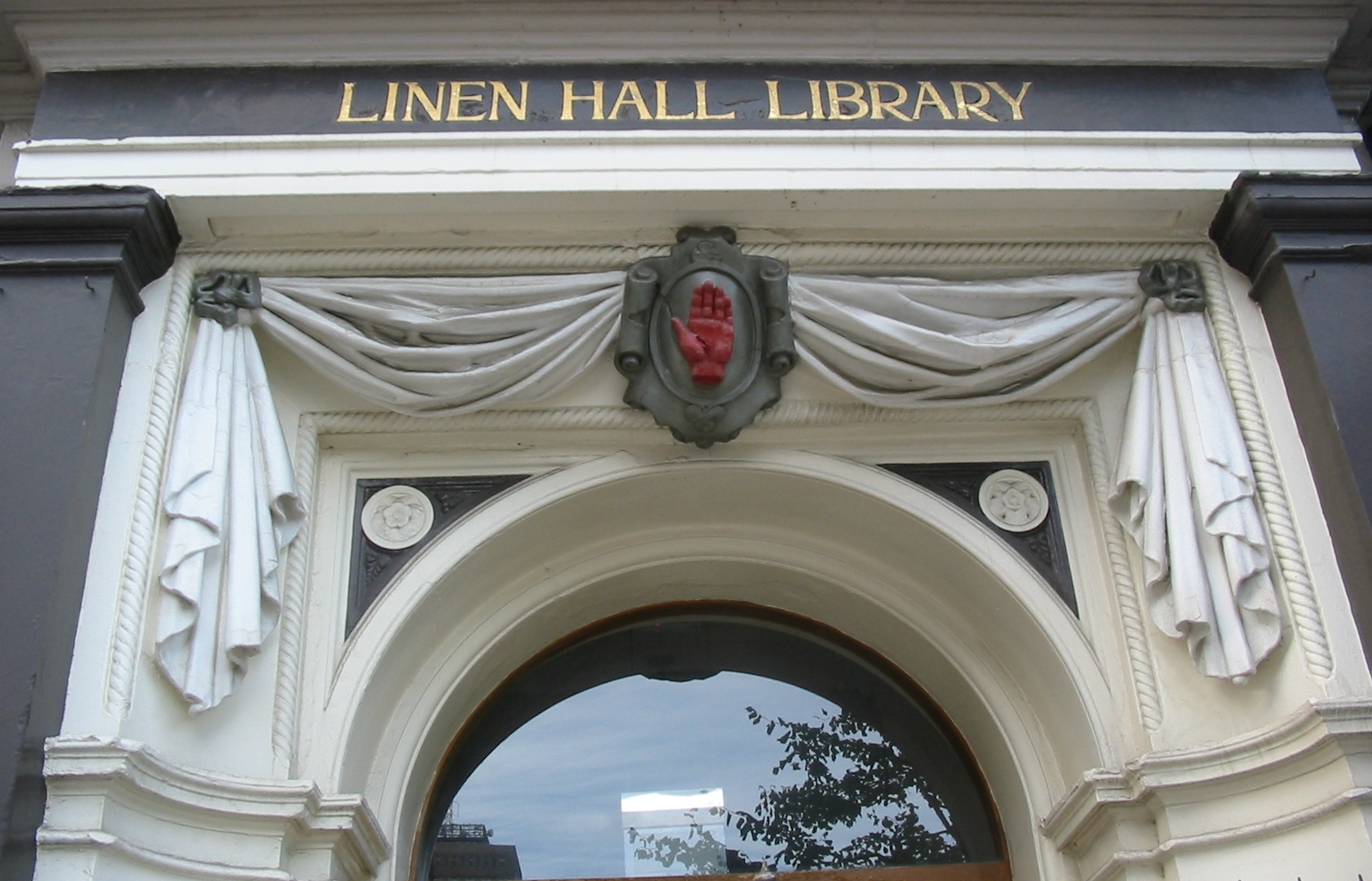

General information
- Type: Subscription library
- Location: Belfast, Northern Ireland
- Coordinates: 54°35′50.60″N 05°55′53.53″W

The Linen Hall Library is located at 17 Donegall Square North, Belfast, Northern Ireland. It is the oldest library in Belfast and the last subscribing library in Northern Ireland. The Library is physically in the centre of Belfast, and more generally at the centre of the cultural and creative life of the wider community. It is an independent and charitable body.

== History ==
=== Early history ===
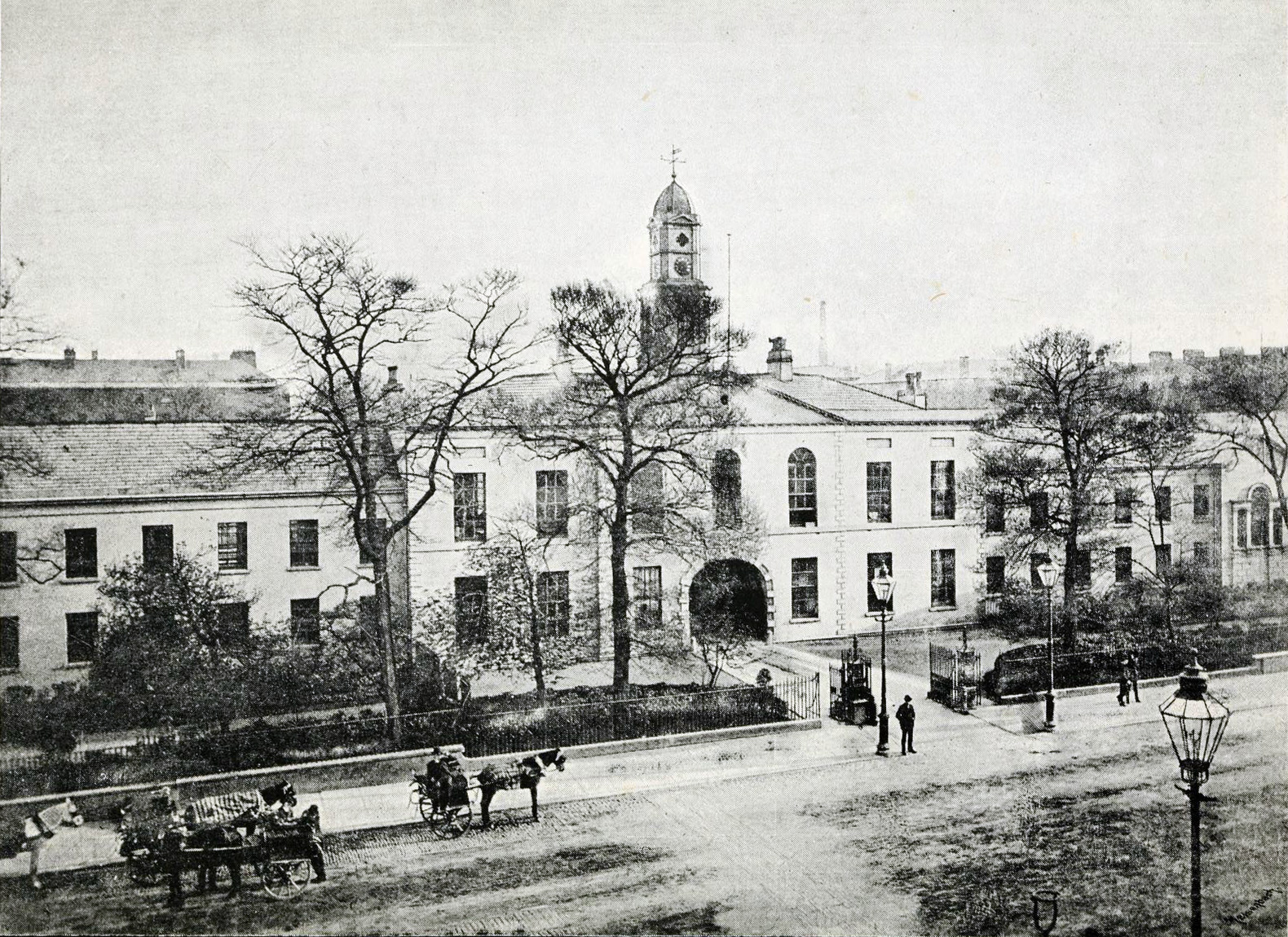
The original Linen Hall Library in 1888, shortly before its demolition and replacement with Belfast City Hall.

In 1788 a group of artisans founded what was initially called the Belfast Reading Society, but soon thereafter the Belfast Society for Promoting Knowledge. In January 1792, the Society, with James McCormick in the chair, unanimously resolved:

1st That civil and religious liberty is the birthright of every human being: that Governments were formed to secure them in the possession of these rights, and that States should be regulated so as to protect them in the exercise of it.

2nd That doctrines of faith and modes of worship can neither give nor take away the rights of men; because opinion is not the Object of Government; because the modes of expressing Religious Worship ought to be left to the judgment of God and the decision of conscience ;and because persecution, however it be disguised, is destructive of the equality of men and the most sacred laws of nature.

The previous October, amidst the continued excitement in the town generated by news of revolutionary developments in France, McCormick had been among a number of members, veterans of the Volunteer movement, who had formed the Society of United Irishmen. In pursuit of the Rights of Man, in the years to come this was to develop as a politically radical, and ultimately insurrectionary, organisation.

In July 1792, leading members of the Society for Promoting Knowledge--Dr. James MacDonnell, Robert Bradshaw, Henry Joy, and Robert Simms--helped fund and organise the Belfast Harpers Assembly, a three-day musical and patriotic event in the Assembly Rooms on Waring Street. The secretary of the Society, the United Irish organiser, Thomas Russell ensured that transcriptions by his friend Edward Bunting of the melodies played were published.

In 1795, the Society adopted a resolution defining its "object" as "the collection of an extensive Library, philosophical apparatus and such products of nature and art as tend to improve the mind and excite a spirit of general enquiry".

It began to acquire books (with a particular focus on those relating to Irish topics, publishing, including Bunting's multi-volume Ancient Irish Music ). The society declined in the later 1790s however, as it owned no permanent premises and struggled with official attempts to control radical thought, though it survived a crackdown after the 1798 rebellion thanks to the efforts of Rev. William Bruce.

In 1802 the Library moved into permanent premises in White Linen Hall (from which it took its name, though legally it is still the Belfast Society for Promoting Knowledge). The Library struggled, however, through most of the 19th century. It became more conservative, attempting to exclude students from Queen's College and debating whether or not to include fiction.

On St. Patrick's Day, 1808, members of library formed the Belfast Harp Society. It continued, until the arrest of its treasurer, Robert Tennent, at an anti-Orange Order protest in August 1813, in its declared task of "preserving the national music and national instrument of Ireland" and of disseminating "information relative to the language, history and antiquities of Ireland".

As the Library's centenary approached it was hit by another setback as it lost its premises in White Linen Hall to make way for the construction of the new City Hall. The Library moved into a warehouse in Donegall Square (previously used for linen), which was designed by Charles Lanyon and his firm, and which the Library occupies as of 2009. At the same time it made the transition from being a private company to one with public duties with regard to care for its collections. This was also a period when the Library became much more ambitious, collecting books with a new vigour and implementing many cultural programmes.

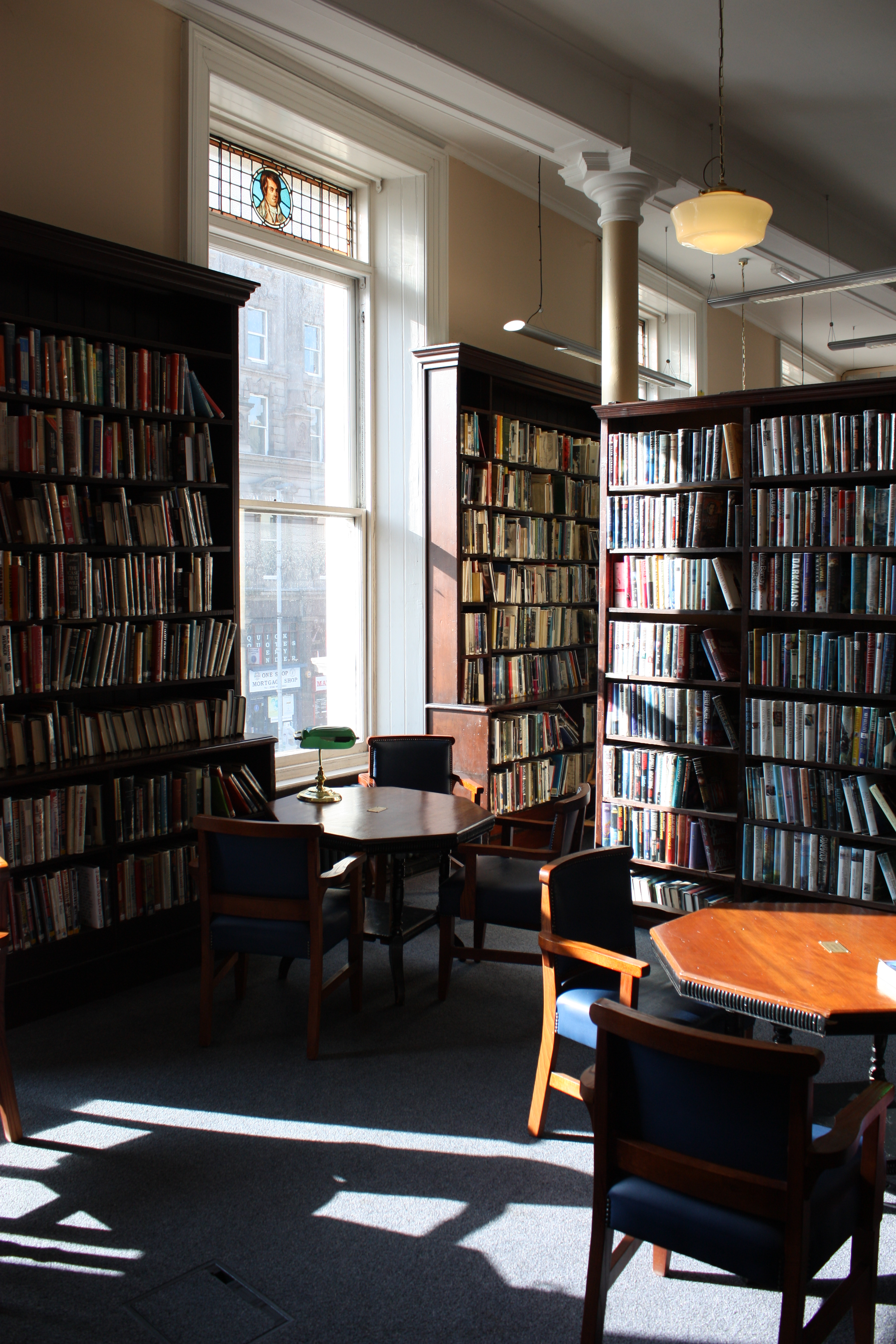
Linen Hall Library, October 2009

In the Interwar period the Library's success continued as the public library system was slow to develop and even after World War II it was a hub of creativity in Northern Ireland. It failed to secure this position, though and in the years following began to decline. Investment in public libraries combined with extensive IRA bombing in the city centre led to membership levels falling. By the end of the 1970s the Library was on the brink of closure, with large amounts of material (including an extensive collection relating to The Troubles) but a poor building, few users and serious money problems. In response, the Department of Education threatened to withdraw its grant and in 1980 proposals were made to close the Library permanently.

=== Later history ===
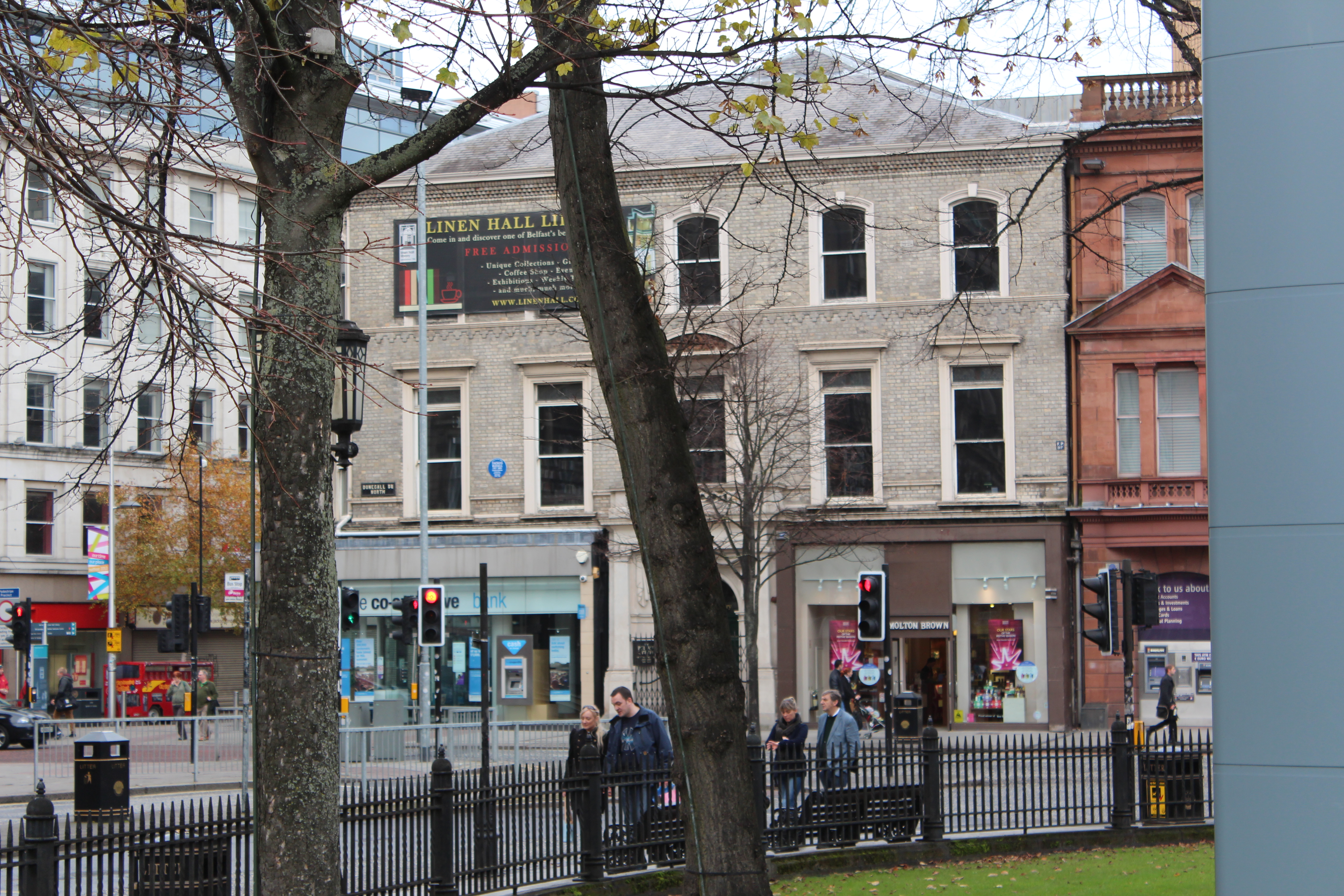
Donegall Square North, Belfast, 2012

After 1980 a fight began to save the library. It was decided that it should begin to allow and encourage free public reference access and to concentrate particularly on Irish studies, politics and culture, both because it was already strong in these areas and so as not to compete with Belfast Central Library. The move was a success. The number of subscribers began to increase and the library increased its role as a cultural centre, both facilitating research and fostering close links with the wider community.

It quickly became apparent that lack of space was holding back the library's revival. After spending ten years exploring various options, a decision was made to purchase a 999-year lease on the upper floors of some neighbouring property in 1996. This was followed by an extensive fundraising campaign to pay for the development of this new property. Construction began in 1999 and was completed in time for the opening on 16 September 2000.

On 27 October 2016 Linen Hall Board President Anne Davies and Director Julie Andrews had the honor of welcoming President of Ireland, Michael D. Higgins for his first visit to the library. A poet himself, Higgins was particularly interested in resources pertaining to local poet Sir Samuel Ferguson. A choir consisting of students from Holy Cross Boys' Primary School and Campbell College performed for the guests of the notable event.

== Holdings ==
In addition to providing a free public reference service and a general lending service for both adults and children the Library also houses several special collections. It is the leading centre for "Irish and Local Studies" in Northern Ireland which includes its comprehensive stock of "Early Belfast and Ulster printed books", periodicals and newspapers dating back as far as 1738 and a wide variety of archive and manuscript material. It also contains an extensive collection of maps (some of great historical interest) and extensive materials in the Irish language. Its "Northern Ireland Political Collection" collected since 1968 contains 250,000 items and is the definitive archive of the recent troubles, containing material looking at all sides of the conflict. It also houses collections devoted to genealogy, the poet Robert Burns and Northern Irish performing art.

Since there is no national library for Northern Ireland, the Linen Hall Library is collecting all books and journals published in Northern Ireland in the 21st century to create NIPR, the National Collection of Northern Ireland Publications (originally the Northern Ireland Publication Resource). The collection is split between the Linen Hall Library and Belfast Central Library.
