= Elizabeth Hamilton (writer) =

Scottish essayist, poet, satirist and novelist

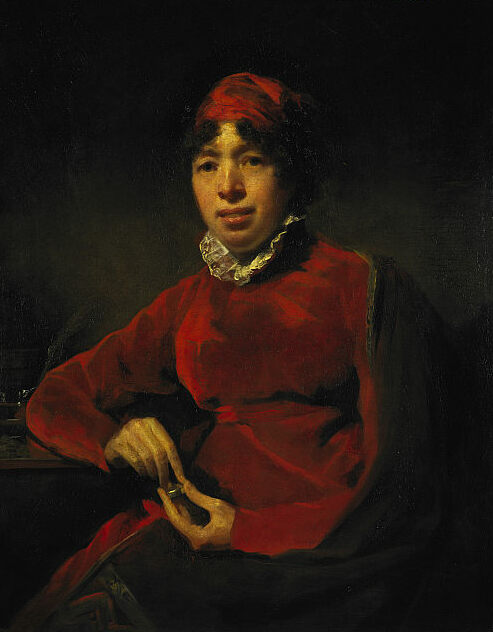
- Portrait of Elizabeth Hamilton, 1812, by Sir Henry Raeburn.
- Born: 25 July 1756; Belfast, Ireland
- Died: 23 July 1816 (aged 59); Harrogate, England
- Occupations: Essayist, poet, novelist
- Writing career
- Language: English

Elizabeth Hamilton (1756 or 1758 – 23 July 1816) was a Scottish essayist, poet, satirist and novelist, who in both her prose and fiction entered into the French-revolutionary era controversy in Britain over the education and rights of women.

== Early life ==
Hamilton was most likely born on 25 July 1756, though the date is often given as 1758. She was born in Belfast, the third and youngest child of Charles Hamilton (d.1759), a Scottish merchant, and his wife Katherine Mackay (d.1767).

In Belfast, Hamilton's parents were on familiar terms with the town's prominent "New Light" Presbyterian families and with their Scottish Enlightenment social and political ideas. Her later thoughts on child education were greatly influenced by David Manson's co-educational English Grammar School, which her older sister Katherine attended with other children from this progressive milieu. Manson advertised the school's capacity to teach children to read and understand the English language "without the discipline of the rod by intermingling pleasurable and healthful exercise with their instruction".

In 1762, after the death of her father, her mother sent Hamilton to live with her paternal aunt, Mrs Marshall who lived near Stirling. In 1772, she lived at Ingram's Crook near Bannockburn.

== Career ==
Hamilton's first literary efforts were directed in supporting her brother Charles in his orientalist and linguistic studies. After his death in 1792 she continued to publish orientalist scholarship, as well as historical, educationalist and theoretical works.

Hamilton maintained Belfast connections. She established a particularly close friendship with Martha McTier (sister of William Drennan, the founder of the United Irishmen), who pioneered schooling for poor girls. In 1793 she visited McTier in Belfast approving of her pedagogic efforts. "My little girls", boasted McTier, "do not gabble over the testament only, nor read with that difficulty which prevents pleasure in it... I keep up my number and four of them can read Fox and Pitt".

In 1796 she published Translation of the Letters of the Hindoo Rajah. The two volume work in the tradition of Montesquieu and Goldsmith, follows the adventures in England of an Indian prince. His encounters with slave owners, capricious aristocrats, sceptical philosophers and belligerent women leads to his progressive disillusionment with English culture.

In 1800 Hamilton produced Memoirs of Modern Philosophers. The novel was a response to the Revolution Controversy of the 1790s, a discussion of "revolutionary ideas about a broader franchise, primogeniture, meritocracy, marriage and divorce". Conservative feminists such as Hannah More argued that "there is a different bent of understanding in the sexes" while those their detractors denounced as "Jacobins", such as Mary Wollstonecraft, insisted that "there is no sex in the soul or mind" and that women were limited only by their inadequate education. In Memoirs, Hamilton occupies a middle ground, urging greater educational opportunity for women but within the bounds of a consciously Christian, middle-class morality that emphasises women's responsibility for the domestic sphere.

Hamilton's most important pedagogical works followed: Letters on Education (1801), Letters on the Elementary Principles of Education (1801), Letters addressed to the Daughter of a Nobleman, on the Formation of Religious and Moral Principle (1806), and Hints addressed to the Patrons and Directors of Schools (1815).

In 1808, Hamilton wrote The Cottagers of Glenburnie (1808), a celebrated tale of Scottish manners and mores which cast a critical eye on hardships and inequities endured by women in domestic life. It also occasioned a lengthy discourse on child education. The fictional Mr Gourley and Mrs Mason direct the teacher William Morrison's efforts to reorganise his school on a spare-the-rod monitorial system emphasising accountability and self-government. Mrs Gourley cites David Manson's account of "what he calls his play school", and in a footnote Hamilton further acknowledges Manson. His "extraordinary talents", she suggests, were exercised in Belfast "in too limited a sphere" to attract the attention they deserved.

Hamilton spent much of her later life in Edinburgh. She died in Harrogate, England after a short illness.

=== Bibliography ===
before 1805

- Translation of the Letters of a Hindoo Rajah (1796)
- Memoirs of Modern Philosophers (1800)
- Letters on Education (1801)
- Letters on the Elementary Principles of Education (1801)
- Memoirs of the Life of Agrippina, the wife of Germanicus (1804)

after 1805

- Letters addressed to the Daughter of a Nobleman (1806)
- The Cottagers of Glenburnie (1808)
- Exercises in Religious Knowledge (1809)
- A Series of Popular Essays (1813)
- Hints Addressed to the Patrons and Directors of Schools (1815)
