= Nicholas Joseph Crowley =

Irish genre and portrait painter (1819–1857)

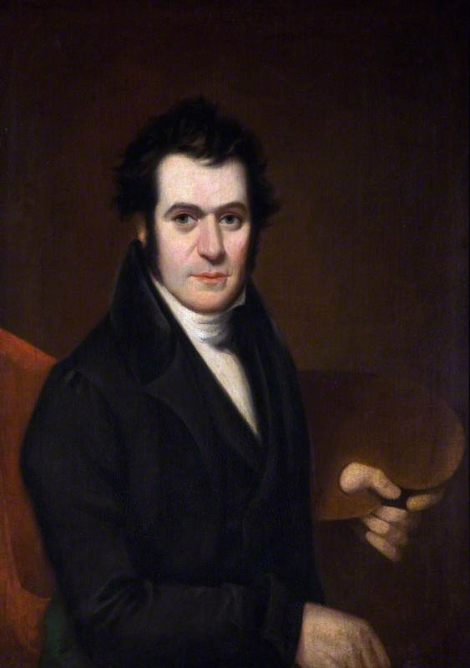
- Self portrait (c. 1854)
- Born: 6 December 1819; Dublin, Ireland
- Died: 4 November 1857 (aged 37); London
- Occupation: Portrait painter

Nicholas Joseph Crowley (6 December 1819–4 November 1857) was an Irish genre and portrait painter. He was highly esteemed as a portrait painter, and was especially good in painting portrait groups.

== Early life and education ==
Crowley was born in Dublin on 6 December 1819. His father, Peter Crowley, died in 1835. He had two older brothers. As a child, Crowley was considered an artistic prodigy. He was first trained at the Royal Dublin Society (RDS) schools from 1827. He then enrolled as a pupil at the Royal Hibernian Academy (RHA) in 1832, age 13, having exhibited there for the first time in 1827 with a portrait of Dr William Crolly. In 1833 he exhibited 6 portraits, and continued to exhibit with the RHA until his death. From 1828 to 1830, and again in 1832, Crowley was awarded premiums by the RDS.

== Career ==
Crowley lived in Belfast between 1835 and 1836, painting a large number of portraits including of Francis McCracken, nephew of Mary Ann McCracken, for his work Fortune telling by cup tossing. On 18 June 1836 he was elected an Associate of the RHA, and later a member on 27 May 1837, becoming the Academy's youngest elected member. Crowley was one of the founding members of Association of Artists in Belfast on its establishment in 1836.

His picture The Eventful Consultation, was his first to be exhibited in London in 1835 with the Royal Academy. After that, Crowley's works were frequently shown in the Royal Academy Exhibitions and the British Institution.

Crowley moved to London in 1837, where he lived for the rest of his life, visiting Dublin occasionally. He first lived at 17 King William Street, and later 13 Upper Fitzroy Street.

== Death ==
Crowley died at his home on Upper Fitzroy Street on 4 November 1857. His nephew, Henry Crowley (1842-1869) was also an artist who worked and exhibited in Dublin.

== Selected works ==
- Tyrone Power as Conor O'Gorman in "The groves of Blarney"
- Taking the veil
- Charles Abbott, Lord Mayor of Dublin (1825), lost in the fire at the City Hall, 11 November 1908
- Prince Napoleon Louis Bonaparte (1840)
- Mary Aikenhead, foundress of the Sisters of Charity in Ireland (1844)
- Madam Celeste-Elliott as Marie Ducange, lithographed by T. Fairland
- Children of S. R. McClean (1850)
- George Colley (1856)
