= War Memorial Building, Belfast =

Listed building in Northern Ireland

Coordinates: 54°36′03″N 05°55′38″W

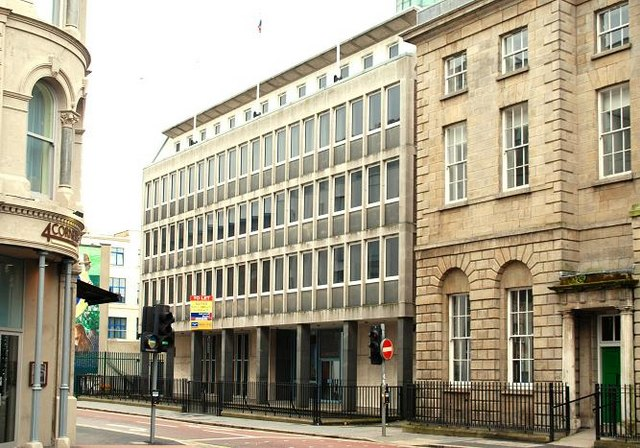
The building in 2009. Sugar House Entry is a narrow passageway between the building and the one on the right

The War Memorial Building is a grade B2 listed building in Belfast, Northern Ireland. The building, modernist in design, was constructed in 1959–1962 on the site of a hotel destroyed during the 1941 Belfast Blitz. The building was formally opened by Queen Elizabeth The Queen Mother and housed organisations and charities related to the British armed forces. The site currently lies empty and has been placed on the Heritage at Risk Register. The current owners have applied for permission to convert the building into a 120-bedroom hotel.

== Design and construction ==
The building's address is 9–13 Waring Street in the Cathedral Quarter. The site was formerly occupied by the Queen Anne Hotel and a number of shops which were destroyed by German bombing during the Belfast Blitz in 1941. The site was redeveloped after the war as a war memorial for Northern Ireland and to provide office space for charities and organisations associated with the armed forces. A design competition was won by English architect Michael Bowley. His design was modern in style with a five-storey concrete façade. The building was built between 1959 and 1962, with construction supervised by architect Granville Smyth.

== Use as offices ==
The War Memorial Building was opened by Queen Elizabeth The Queen Mother in 1963. The building housed the offices of the Council of the Northern Ireland War Memorial, who also used part of the building to house an exhibition on the role Northern Irish people played during the Second World War. The separate Royal Ulster Rifles regimental museum was also located in the building. On 18 February 1970 the War Memorial Building was the site for the swearing in of the first 19 recruits to the 7th Battalion, Ulster Defence Regiment. The first two men sworn in were symbolically a Catholic new recruit and Protestant British Army veteran.

The occupants of the building gradually vacated it with the Council of the Northern Ireland War Memorial moving to nearby Talbot Street in 2006 and selling the building. The Council took with them original features including a stained-glass memorial window by Stanley Murray Scott, a Belgian-marble memorial plaque, copper frieze by James McKendry and rolls of honour for the two world wars.

The building continued to be used as offices and was owned by a number of people, including Liverpool-based property developer Lawrence Kenwright. In 2010 the empty ground floor was marketed as a potential site for a bar and restaurant but was instead, from 2011, leased as offices for Colliers.

== Redevelopment proposals ==
In 2015 then owner CBRE Group put the War Memorial Building up for sale with an asking price of £850,000. In 2021 Northern Irish firm SOM Properties purchased the building. The building, which is grade B2 listed, is currently empty and has been placed on the Heritage at Risk Register.

Following several plans to convert the structure into a hotel SOM Properties applied for planning permission for a conversion in September 2022. The application outlines a refurbishment into a 120-bedroom hotel with a rooftop bar and restaurant. The plans include for a 6-storey extension at the rear with the creation of a courtyard, and removal of most of the concrete façade.

The plans would also reopen Sugar House Entry, one of the Belfast entries that was blocked up in the 1970s for security reasons. Sugar House Entry was formerly home to a number of inns, one of which was the first meeting place of the Society of United Irishmen.
