= The Belfast Entries =

Alleyways in Belfast, Northern Ireland

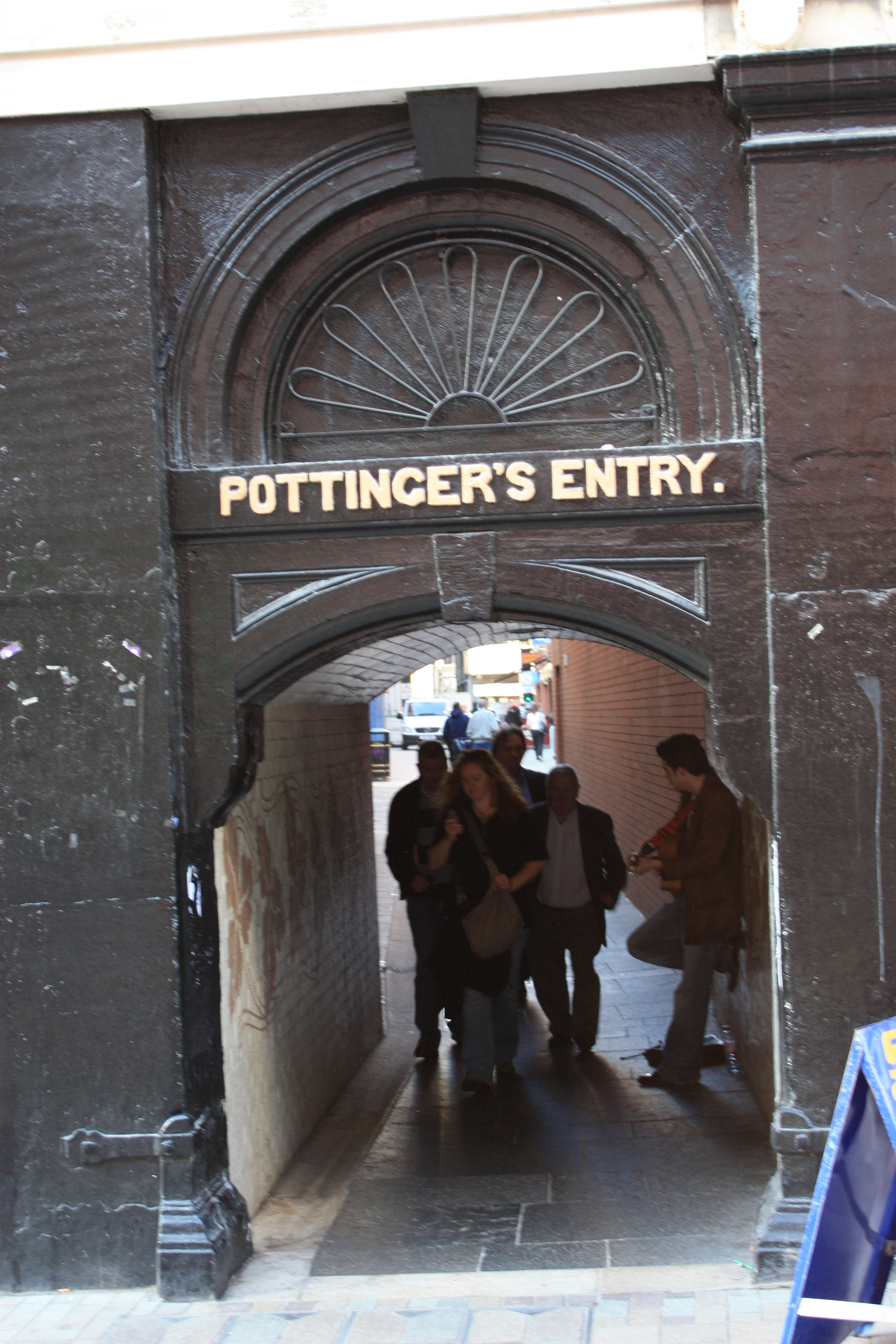
Pottinger's Entry, October 2009

The Belfast Entries are a series of historical narrow alleyways in the city centre of Belfast, Northern Ireland, mostly in the vicinity of High Street and Ann Street. When the town was first laid out, these alleyways serviced dense residential and commercial development. The surviving examples retain pockets of historic development including many Victorian and pre-Victorian period pubs, some of which remain open for business to this day. Former Social Development Minister David Hanson described the Entries as the streets "where Belfast began and developed into the city it is today". Dating back to at least 1630 but most probably earlier than that, these entries are the oldest parts of Belfast city.

The entries running north from High Street were largely destroyed during the Belfast Blitz in the Second World War. Despite this, some remain. In 2006 and 2007, a number of the Entries underwent environmental refurbishment to improve their condition.

== The Entries ==
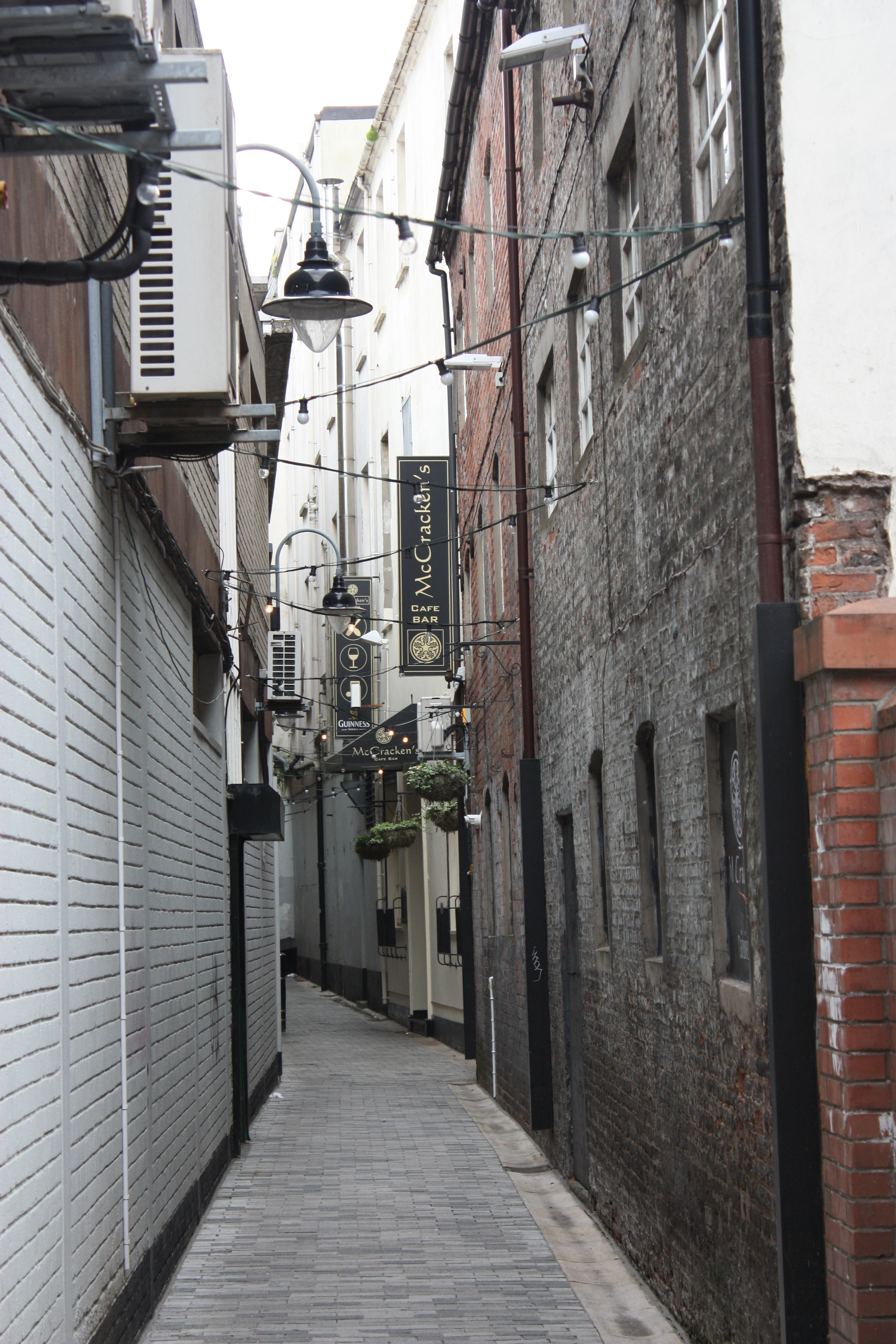
Joy's Entry, June 2010

=== Pottinger's Entry ===
Pottinger's Entry (/ˈpɒtɪndʒərz/ POT-in-jərz) connects Ann Street with High Street in almost a straight line. The principal attraction is a Victorian pub, The Morning Star. The arched entrance from Ann Street is also Victorian and was retained when the original building was demolished in the 1990s. This entrance is a popular spot for buskers. This is undoubtedly the most obvious of the Entries, featuring large wrought-iron signs above each entrance archway.

=== Winecellar Entry ===
A small Entry just off Lombard Street, Winecellar Entry is home to White's Tavern, a pub founded in 1630. Whilst considered to be the longest serving pub in Belfast, it has managed to retain much of its authenticity.

=== Crown Entry ===
Crown Entry is medium-sized and connects Ann Street to High Street.

=== Joy's Entry ===
Joy's Entry is particularly narrow and connects Ann Street to High Street. It has several pubs, including Henry’s and The Jailhouse. The Entry takes its name from the Joy family who were prominent 18th-century residents of the city, including Francis Joy, founder of The Belfast News Letter, and his grandson Henry Joy McCracken, after whom the pub is named.

=== Wilson's Court ===
An Entry just off Ann Street.

=== Castle Arcade ===
Castle Arcade, although a historic route, now lacks character due to the modern buildings on either side. It cuts diagonally from Cornmarket/High Street to Castle Lane. Several large historical photographs of the Entry are permanently displayed on the walls.

=== Sugar House Entry ===
Running parallel to Bridge Street from north side of High Street, it runs to Waring Street. It is now a through route again - it had been sealed off between 1972 and 2024. Kremlin Associates Ltd purchased the former War Memorial Building on Waring Street in 2015. They converted the building into a hotel and played a role in the renewal of the entry as a through route.
