= Mary E. Balfour =

Irish poet and playwright, fl. 1789–1810

- Born: Limavady
- Died: Belfast

Mary E. Balfour (fl. 1789–1810) was an Irish poet, who along with her original poems translated Irish poetry into English. She is believed to be Belfast's only 19th-century female playwright.

== Biography ==
Mary E. Balfour was born on 24 January in Limavady, with some sources giving the year as 1755. Others believe this date seems unlikely given that the marriage of her parents, John Balfour and a daughter of Dr Samuel Moore of Derry, took place in January 1778. This could make her year of birth 1789, which better aligns with the dates of birth of her younger sisters and the characters in her poems. Her father was appointed rector of Errigal, County Londonderry. After the death of her father, Balfour and her sisters had to support themselves by teaching, initially in Newtown Limavady, then in Belfast.

Barbour had democratic and republican sympathies. She celebrated the sacrifice in the United Irish cause of Henry Joy McCracken at the gallows in 1798 in her poems "The Seventeenth of July", the date of his execution when "the despot triumphs and the patriot weeps," and "The sword of my Harry": "Some hearts with freedom's tide still fondly swell,/Some lips yet dare the hero's worth to tell...".

With McCracken's activist sister, Mary Ann McCracken, Balfour was a founding member of the committee of the Harp Society in 1808. She contributed four translations of Irish poems into English to A General Collection of the Ancient Music of Ireland (1809) by the McCracken family protégé Edward Bunting.

Her only book of poems Hope: a poetical essay with various other poems (Belfast, 1810) contains a variety of poems with classical themes, and a set of poems that were intended to be words to the Irish songs collected by Bunting. From her work it looks as if Balfour was one of the earliest Irish writers interested in music and folklore. Her 1814 stage play Kathleen O'Neil: a grand national melodrama in three acts was published anonymously. It was about a female deer hunter and was staged in Belfast in 1814.

Her date of death is unconfirmed. A note in a volume of poems by John McKinley published in 1819 suggests she had died, and that year and her age at death as 39 has been elsewhere quoted.
