= Martha McTier =

Irish women's health and education advocate

Martha (Drennan) McTier
- Born: 1742/1743; Belfast, Kingdom of Ireland
- Died: 3 October 1837; Belfast, United Kingdom of Great Britain and Ireland
- Occupations: School teacher, hospital visitor
- Notable work: Collected correspondence
- Movement: Society of United Irishmen

Martha "Matty" McTier (1742/1743 – 3 October 1837) was an advocate in Belfast, Ireland for women's health and education, and a supporter of democratic reform. Her correspondence with her brother William Drennan and with other leading United Irishmen documents the political radicalism and tumult of late eighteenth-century Ulster.

== Early life and family ==
Martha McTier was born Martha Drennan in 1742 or 1743 in Belfast, the eldest of three surviving children born to Ann Drennan (née Lennox) and Reverend Thomas Drennan, minister of the First Presbyterian Church in Belfast. There is no record of her childhood or education, but she appears to have been greatly influenced by her father whose New Light theology bore the imprint of his mentor, the moral philosopher (and father of the Scottish Enlightenment) Francis Hutcheson. She was to read widely in philosophy (Rousseau, de Volney, Montesquieu, Hume), and in literature (Fielding, Edgeworth, Elizabeth Hamilton, Marie-Medeleine de La Fayette).

McTier married Samuel McTier, a widower and chandler from Belfast, in 1773. In 1795 he died intestate leaving McTier and her stepdaughter Margaret McTier (1762–1845) in poverty. She and Margaret continued to live together, supported in small part by a small annuity from a cousin of McTier, and by taking in an orphaned girl as a paying guest. Despite her own financial straights, she sought to support her brother William Drennan and his new family in Dublin where his medical practice suffered as a result of his political notoriety. She persuaded their cousin, Martha Young, to bequeath him her fortune, and this enabled him in 1806 to retire from practice and return to Belfast.

== Women's health and education ==
In 1793 McTier was invited to become the secretary of the new Humane Female Society. The Society helped establish and sustain Belfast's Lying-in (maternity) Hospital, and she would remain active with the Society for many years. At the outset there had been some resistance to admitting unmarried women and prostitutes. McTier reported to her brother that despite "the appearance of unanimity", she saw a "party forming under the pretext of keeping out unmarried women", which she believed was attempting to raise opposition against "those who are now deemed democrats".

When in the same year McTier established a small school in her home for poor girls she began to read more of the literature on women's education by female writers. In addition to Wollstonecraft, she drew inspiration from Anna Laetitia Barbauld, Ann Radcliffe and Belfast-born Elizabeth Hamilton (who visited with her in 1793). It is probable that she was also influenced by the non-coercive ("spare the rod") and peer-tutoring methods of David Manson who was much admired by Hamilton. Manson's school in Donegall Street had been attended by a number of McTier's friends and acquaintances including Mary Ann McCracken. "My little girls", wrote McTier, "do not gabble over the testament only, nor read with that difficulty which prevents pleasure in it... I keep up my number and four of them can read Fox and Pitt".

In April 1795 McTier and Lady Harriet Skeffington proposed a more ambitious scheme to a town meeting, a residential school for girls with food and clothing provided. The proposal promoted a debate in the press. A letter to the Northern Star signed "The Bucks" sarcastically declaimed: "We love girls educated above their rank, and their heads filled with ideas beyond their means. We by experience, know the consequence - we shall always have fresh supplies from your excellent seminary". In spite of the opposition, McTier and Skeffington prevailed. Two years later the Union School was supporting twenty-one girls.

== United Irishwoman ==
McTier's forty-year correspondence with her brother William begins in 1776 when he was studying medicine in Edinburgh and continued as he moved, with his obstetrics practice, from Belfast to Newry and Dublin. Frequently "the brighter wit ... and clearer eye", she was both his personal and political confidante. When her husband became president of the United Irishmen in Belfast, McTier was drawn into the group's activities. The leading figures of the movement, including Theobald Wolfe Tone and Thomas Russell (who she was to regard as "another brother"), frequently gathered in her home.

Martha McTier was "aware of the difficulties involved in asserting a political identity independent of her brother or her husband": "women connected with men whose side is known", she commented, "ought to be very cautious, as they are supposed to be only echoes"." In an attempt to avoid controversy in Belfast's politically-divided social circles, she would not discuss politics when attending local coteries, assemblies and card parties. Nonetheless, rumours about her correspondence circulated. A local gossip described her as a "violent republican" who had "put up or recruited a hundred men to the United Irish cause".

In June 1797 her brother warned her of a rumour circulating in Dublin that she was writing for the United Irish newspaper, the Northern Star. She responded to him immediately with a denial crafted for the local postmaster whom she suspected of opening her letters. (Already in May 1794 she had received a threat, apparently written on Post Office paper, warning that if she continued with her "high flown letters" she would wind up "a matron to a madhouse in Botany Bay"). She also exchanged numerous letters with her close friend Jane Greg. Greg, the daughter of a wealthy Belfast shipping merchant, moved between Belfast and England where, with Roger O'Connor, she cultivated a circle of United Irish sympathisers.

In May the Belfast Postmaster had alerted the secretary to the Irish Post Office to her correspondence with Jane Greg, describing Greg as "very active" at "the head of the Female Societies" in Belfast. A letter, purportedly from the secretary of the United Irishwomen, was published in the Northern Star in October 1796. It blamed the violence of the American and French revolutions on English aggression. Greg was the likely author, but Martha felt herself under suspicion.

For the postmaster's benefit she wrote a letter to her brother denying any knowledge of or involvement in the United Irishwomen and reflected that "it is strange that an obscure name, and female, could be noticed by strangers", though, she added, "I flatter myself I am not insignificant enough however to be termed a neutral". From her earlier (and freer) correspondence it is clear that McTier was not neutral and that she had been active within a United-Irish circle. "This evening we had a meeting of our select society", she wrote to her brother in December 1792, "where we were unanimously of the opinion that the Catholic Committee [in Dublin] should ask nothing less than total emancipation and full right of citizenship, this to be intimated by this post to [Wolfe] Tone [then Secretary of the Catholic Committee]."

== Political views ==
=== Democratic sympathies ===
McTier shared her husband's and her brother's radical commitment to a national and representative government for Ireland. She read, sometimes in advance of her brother, most of the radical writers of her time, including Thomas Paine, William Godwin, and Mary Wollstonecraft (who had replied, before Paine, to Edmund Burke's Reflections on the Revolution in France).

The Reverend William Bruce, successor to her father's pulpit at Belfast's First Presbyterian Church, protested in the Belfast News Letter that the commitment in Drennan's United Irish test to an "impartial representation" of the nation implied, not only that Catholics, but also "every woman, in short, every rational being shall have equal weight in electing representatives". It may be a testament to McTier's influence that, in his response, her brother allowed that he had never seen "a good argument against the right of women to vote".

McTier had clear democratic sympathies. In 1795 she wrote approvingly to her brother of Belfast's Jacobin Club (which included United Irishmen), describing it as composed of "persons and rank long kept down [who] now come forward with a degree of information that might shame their betters".

At a time when philanthropic women "were attempting to tame the masses with soothing moral tracts", James Winder Good noted that McTier "plumped for real education and knowledge of public affairs". In 1795 she wrote to her brother: "So much have I gained by newspapers, and so ardently have I seen them sought for and enjoyed by the lower orders, that I intend to institute for their good a gratis newsroom with fire and candles, a scheme which you might laugh at, but if followed in the country towns might have a wonderful effect". This was in essence, Wood suggests, a doctrine "much more revolutionary than the gospel preached by the majority of the professed revolutionists of the period". (Daniel O'Connell's Repeal Association and the Young Irelanders were to introduce just such a scheme, public reading rooms, with great effect in the 1840s).

=== Alarmed by revolutionary violence ===
While alerted, following her brother's arrest in 1793, that her letters were being opened and read by the authorities, McTier refused to be cowed. She assured Drennan that "in these times I never will be gagged". Yet she often advised caution, seeming to welcome her brother's growing distance from the inner counsels of the United Irishmen. But this may not, alone, have been a concern for her brother's safety. Her enthusiasm for Revolutionary France, from which the United Irish sought practical assistance, was cooled more rapidly than his by reports of political violence.

When news reached them of the September 1792 massacres in Paris, Drennan suggested that when the forces of reaction were at the gates it was "no time to weigh nice points of morality"- McTier, however, confessed herself "turned, quite turned, against the French," and feared that the Revolution was "all farther than ever from coming to good". She grew wary of the "bloody cost" of subverting "all religion and order" for "an experiment of what can only be a doubtful improvement".

In 1798, like her brother in Dublin, in Belfast McTier was in a heavily garrisoned town in which there was little prospect of a rebel demonstration. Neither was implicated in the United Irish insurrection which was defeated to the north of Belfast at Antrim and to its south at Ballynahinch. Her position in Belfast was nonetheless fraught, as she daily anticipated a raid by the authorities upon her house. "You seem to think", she wrote to her brother, "that I should fly. Why, I have not one fear. 'Tis only the rich area alarmed, or the guilty. I am neither".

With executions proceeding, McTier successfully petitioned General Nugent to spare Joseph Crombie, the son of the Reverend James Crombie. Crombie later emigrated to America.

=== On the Union ===
Having, as she explained, so long "clung to free and rising Ireland", McTier opposed as "degrading" Act of Union which in 1801 incorporated Ireland under the British Crown and Parliament at Westminster. She counselled Irishmen to "remain sulky, grave, prudent, and watchful, not subdued into tame servility, poverty and contempt, not satisfied till time blunts their chains and feelings, but ardent to seize the possible moment of national revenge"

Yet, her correspondence reveals that she shared the concern that rapidly was to reconcile many northern Presbyterians to the Union. As a Belfast Protestant, McTier was conscious of a loss of the "easy sense of security" in numbers as the town's industrial growth drew in Catholics from the rural hinterland. As early as 1802 she bemoaned the fact that the "R[oman] Catholics here [are] now a large though poor and unknown body." On hearing that they had staged a "singing procession" in the street she confessed to her brother: "I begin to fear these people, and think like the Jews they will regain their native land."

== Later life and legacy ==
In Belfast McTier continued her charitable and school commitments, sometimes alongside Mary Ann McCracken (sister to Henry Joy McCracken, hanged in 1798) until, in old age, she lost her sight. McTier died on 3 October 1837.

The collected correspondence of McTier and her brother spanned 40 years and 1,500 letters. They are frequently cited as a source for the period of Irish politics and history spanning Grattan's parliament, the 1798 Rebellion and the passing of the Act of Union.
