= News Letter =

Daily newspaper in Northern Ireland

- Type: Daily newspaper
- Format: Tabloid
- Owner: Iconic Media Group (Media Concierge)
- Founder: Francis Joy
- Editor: Vacant (see below)
- Founded: September 1737; 289 years ago
- Political alignment: British unionism
- Language: English
- Headquarters: Suite 305 Glandore, Arthur House, 41 Arthur Street
- City: Belfast, Northern Ireland
- Circulation: 5,858 (as of 2024)
- Website: newsletter.co.uk

The News Letter is one of Northern Ireland's main daily newspapers, published from Monday to Saturday. It is the world's oldest English-language general daily newspaper still in publication, having first been printed in September 1737. The newspaper's editorial stance and readership is unionist. Its primary competitors are the Belfast Telegraph and The Irish News.

The News Letter has changed hands several times since the mid-1990s. Since May 2025 it has been owned by Iconic Media Group Limited, the renamed publishing business of National World, following that company's takeover by Media Concierge, the London-based group led by Malcolm Denmark. It was formerly known as the Belfast News Letter, but its coverage spans the whole of Northern Ireland (and often Great Britain and the Republic of Ireland), so the word Belfast does not appear on the masthead any more.

== History ==
Francis Joy

Founded in 1737, the News Letter was first printed in Joy's Entry in Belfast. It is one of a series of "entries" (narrow alleys) in the city centre, and is currently home to Henry's Pub (formerly McCracken's) – named after Henry Joy McCracken, an Irish Presbyterian and a leading member in the north of Ireland of the republican Society of the United Irishmen, and the grandson of the News Letter's founder.

The Joy family were of Huguenot descent and were very active in the life of 18th-century Belfast, being noted for compiling materials about its history. Francis Joy, who founded the paper, had come to Belfast early in the century from the County Antrim village of Killead. In Belfast, he married the daughter of the town sovereign (mayor), and set up practice as an attorney.

In 1737, in settlement of a debt, he obtained a small printing press and used it to publish the town's first newspaper in Bridge Street. The family later bought a paper mill in Ballymena, and were able to produce enough paper not only for their own publication but for the whole of Ulster. In the buildup to the Acts of Union 1800, the paper took a pro-government stance.

The earliest available edition of the News Letter that survives is from 3 October 1738 (which is equivalent to 14 October in the modern calendar).

Samples from that antiquated edition include reports about a highway robbery (where a bandit "took from a Sardinian Gentleman a Purse of Guineas and a rich Scimitar", among other things) at Newbury and the theft of a horse ("Four Years Old, and about Fourteen hands high") at Ballyhome.

Over the centuries, the News Letter's reports have spanned the rule of 77 different prime ministers and 10 monarchs. It is one of the few newspapers still in business which reported on the US Declaration of Independence (carrying the news in an edition in late August 1776).

Originally published three times weekly, it became daily in 1855. Before the partition of Ireland, the News Letter was distributed island-wide.

=== The Troubles ===
On 20 March 1972, the newspaper's offices, then in Donegall Street in the north of the city centre, were bombed by the IRA. The paper reported at the time that "two false alarms were phoned in about another bomb just around the corner in Church Street; people were evacuated – towards the real bomb".

It detonated at 11.58 am, three minutes after an accurate warning had been given about the bomb's whereabouts. Seven people died, and over 140 were injured (with some staff among the wounded). Nevertheless, the paper came out the next day.

One of the recurring motifs of the News Letter's editorial line today is to remind people of the scale of the paramilitary bloodshed during the Troubles, with the vast bulk of crimes being unsolved.

=== Today ===
In recent years, the paper's business model has focussed on increasing subscriptions (home delivery and collection for the print edition, mobile devices/laptops for the digital one). A paywall structure is in operation online, allowing people to read five articles per week without subscribing (though some content is purposely kept behind the paywall). In the second half of 2016 the News Letter was the fastest-growing regional news site in the UK.

Historical copies of the News Letter, dating back to 1828, are available to search and view in digitised form at the British Newspaper Archive. There are also historic copies of the News Letter available for public access in the Belfast Newspaper Library, at the north end of the city centre, attached to the main Belfast Central Library. Back copies of the physical newspaper can be bought, going back three months.

=== Change of ownership ===
In December 2024 the board of National World – which had acquired the News Letter as part of the former Johnston Press/JPIMedia business at the end of 2020 – accepted an all-cash takeover offer from Media Concierge, the London-based group led by Malcolm Denmark and owner of the Irish regional publisher Iconic Newspapers, valuing National World at £65.1 million (23p per share). Shareholders approved the deal in February 2025, and the acquisition became effective on 27 May 2025, after which National World was delisted from the London Stock Exchange and taken into private ownership. National World Publishing Limited was subsequently renamed Iconic Media Group Limited, and in October 2025 the wider group of local and regional titles was rebranded under the "Iconic" name; the group also withdrew its papers from the Audit Bureau of Circulations. Iconic Media Group's first accounts as owner reported turnover of £52.1 million and a pre-tax loss of about £3.6 million for the nine months to 30 September 2025, a period affected by one-off costs relating to the acquisition and restructuring. In 2026 Iconic acquired the Dungannon-based Alpha Newspaper Group, associated with the unionist peer Lord Kilclooney, and its 13 titles.

== Editors ==
Editor	Tenure	Notes	Sources
Francis Joy	1737 – c.1760s	Founder and first editor	
Henry Joy I	mid-18th century	Member of founding Joy family	
Robert Joy	mid-18th century	Member of founding Joy family	
Henry Joy II	late 18th century	Member of founding Joy family	
Alexander MacKay	1796 – early 19th century	Took over the business and editorship in 1796	
James Stuart	1821 – 1820s	Historian; first independent editor	
James McKnight	1820s–1830s	Political writer and tenant-right advocate	
Robert Mooney	mid-19th century	Graduate of Trinity College Dublin	
Sir Frederick Falkiner	mid-19th century	Later senior court official in Dublin	
W. H. Kisbey	mid-19th century	Later county court judge in Louth	
Richard Lilburn	1867 – 1898	Retired in 1898	
W. G. Anderson	1898 – 1928	Succeeded Lilburn	
William McKee	1928	Very short tenure before replacement	
Robert Hamilton	1928 – mid-20th century	Former London editor of the newspaper	
Cowan Watson	1965 – 1976	Stood down for health reasons	
Ken Withers	1976 – 1978	Left after internal dispute	
John Trew	1978 – 1983	Stood down on health grounds	
Sam Butler	1983 – 1990	Former UUP press officer; left to join Today newspaper	
Geoff Martin	1990 – 2002	Later returned to English weekly newspapers	
Nigel Wareing	2002 – 2004	Former editor-in-chief of Greater Manchester Weekly Newspapers	
Austin Hunter	2004 – 2006	Former PSNI communications director	
Darwin Templeton	2006 – 2011	Later joined UTV	
Rankin Armstrong	2012 – 2015	Retired in 2015	
Alistair (Alister) Bushe	2015 – 2021	Later joined Reach plc	
Ben Lowry	2021 – 2026	Former deputy editor; departed July 2026 (see below). No replacement appointed.	

=== Departure of Ben Lowry (2026) ===
Ben Lowry left the News Letter in July 2026; his last day in post was 23 July, and in a statement he said that after almost two decades he no longer worked at the paper. Writing in the Belfast Telegraph on 1 August 2026, its Northern Ireland editor Sam McBride – a former News Letter political editor – reported that Lowry's departure had been involuntary and that the paper did not intend to appoint a replacement, leaving the title without a dedicated editor. McBride reported that no company statement had been issued, that staff had not been formally told of the departure, and that there was no suggestion Lowry had been guilty of misconduct; Lowry indicated in a farewell email that he expected the owner to appoint an editor-in-chief across Iconic Media's Northern Ireland titles. Rankin Armstrong, a former editor, criticised the handling of the departure, and Séamus Dooley of the National Union of Journalists called on the publisher to confirm that the paper would retain its own editor and its editorial independence.

== Other publications ==
The paper publishes the agricultural supplement Farming Life on Wednesdays and Saturdays, included within the newspaper itself. It publishes a weekend supplement on Saturdays, containing features and commentary and TV guide. It also publishes a supplement for the Twelfth of July celebrations.

In addition to the News Letter's coverage of the Renewable Heat Incentive scandal from 2016 to the present, a book entitled Burned: The Inside Story of the 'Cash-for-Ash' Scandal and Northern Ireland's Secretive New Elite, by its (now former) political correspondent Sam McBride (a frequent media commentator on Northern Irish affairs), was published in 2019 by Merrion.

== Print circulation ==
Year (period)	Average circulation per issue
2005 (July to December)	28,616
2007 (January to June)	26,803
2008 (January to June)	26,199
2011 (January to June)	23,492
2013 (January to June)	19,550
2016 (January to June)	15,475
2017 (January to June)	14,900
2018 (January to June)	13,374
2018 (July to December)	12,499
2019 (January to June)	11,829
2019 (July to December)	11,076
2021 (January to June)	9,505
2021 (July to December)	8,958

== See also ==
- Category:Belfast News Letter people
