= Irish rebellion of 1803 =

1803 Irish rebellion against British rule

- Flag raised by Robert Emmet
| Date | 23 July 1803 |
| Location | Dublin, Ireland |
| Result | Rebellion suppressed |

Belligerents
| United Irishmen | United Kingdom |

Commanders and leaders
| Robert Emmet (executed); Myles Byrne; James Hope; William McCabe; Thomas Russell (executed) | William Wickham; Henry Edward Fox; Viscount Kilwarden † |

Casualties and losses
| 50 killed 23 executed | 20 killed |
- Several civilians killed

The Irish rebellion of 1803 was an attempt by Irish republicans to seize the seat of the British government in Ireland, Dublin Castle, and trigger a nationwide insurrection. Renewing the struggle of 1798, they were organised under a reconstituted United Irish directorate. Hopes of French aid, of a diversionary rising by radical militants in England, and of Presbyterians in the north-east rallying once more to the cause of a republic were disappointed. The rising in Dublin misfired, and after a series of street skirmishes, the rebels dispersed. Their principal leader, Robert Emmet, was executed; others went into exile.

== Strategy of the new United Irish directory ==
In the aftermath of the 1798 rebellion a number of younger United Irishmen were still at liberty, but in communication with state prisoners held at Fort George in Scotland, worked to re-establish their organisation on strictly military lines. On the express assumption that the people, "panting for emancipation", would follow "the Republican talent ... whenever they call them forth to act", their New Plan of Organisation dispensed with the protocols of a mass-membership organisation, and reserved to themselves, as a national directorate, the authority to appoint and command.

The strategy, as before, was to solicit a French invasion and to coordinate, if possible, with radical conspirators in Great Britain. To this end, in December 1798 William Putnam McCabe (son of the co-founder in Belfast of the first United Irish society, Thomas McCabe) set out for France, stopping first in London to renew contact with the network of English Jacobins, the United Britons. But as there had been in the preparation of the earlier rebellion, there was to be a growing rift between those who believed that Ireland had to be part of a larger French-assisted scheme, and those convinced that significant French aid would be forthcoming only to defend an independence already won.

In the summer of 1800, McCabe was joined in Paris by Robert Emmet (younger brother of the Dublin society co-founder, Thomas Addis Emmet) and by Malachy Delaney (a veteran of Austrian military service). Through foreign minister Talleyrand, they presented Napoleon with a memorial that assured him that the Union with Great Britain, imposed in the wake of the rebellion, had "in no way eased the discontent of Ireland", and that the country would rise at the first news of a French landing.

From his own interviews with Napoleon, and with Talleyrand, in the autumn of 1802, Emmet concluded that in their contest with England (paused by the Treaty of Amiens, March 1802) the French would have scant regard for Ireland's interests. The most that should be sought was money, arms, ammunition and perhaps officers but not, as had been attempted by Wolfe Tone in December 1796, the landing of a French army.

Emmet's scepticism regarding French assistance, was a mark of his emerging leadership. Michael Fayne, a Kildare conspirator, later testified that Emmet used the talk of French assistance only to "encourage the lower orders of people", as he often heard him say that as bad as an English government was, it was better than a French one", and that his object was "an independent state brought about by Irishmen only".

Meanwhile, in England, hopes of reviving the allied network ("United Englishmen"/"United Britons") that Irish emissaries had helped build out of disparate democratic clubs in the 1790s were dealt a blow in November 1802. The government arrested, and in February 1803 executed, the alleged ringleaders of a United conspiracy (the "Despard Plot”) to assassinate of the King, seize the Tower of London, and spark a rising in the northern mill towns. In the proclamation he was to issue on the day of the rising in Dublin, Emmet felt it necessary to offer the assurance that the defeat of this "similar attempt in England" had neither "retarded" not "accelerated" republican preparations in Ireland. These had proceeded "without hope of foreign assistance".

== Preparations for the rising ==
After his return to Dublin in October 1802, Emmet assembled a cadres of what, in the old society, had been mid-level activists, including, in addition to McCabe, William Dowdall, Michael Quigley, Malachy Delaney, James Hope and Nicholas Stafford. From Paris they were joined in January 1803 by William Henry Hamilton, and in April by Thomas Russell (like Dowdall a former state prisoner), who was himself sceptical of the French commitment. Assisted by a legacy of £2,000 left to Emmet by his father, they set about preparing an insurrection proposed for the end of July 1803.

On St Patrick's Day, 17 March 1803, Myles Byrne recalls Emmet, in a stirring address to his confederates, justifying their resort to arms. He reiterated the case presented in Paris: if the Irish felt that they had cause in 1798, it had only been compounded by the legislative union with Britain. As long as Ireland retained in her own parliament a "vestige of self-government", her people could entertain hopes of representation and reform. But now "in consequence of the accursed union":

[S]even-eights of the population have no right to send a member of their body to represent them, even in a foreign parliament, and the other eight part of the population are the tools and taskmasters, acting for the cruel English government and their Irish Ascendancy--a monster still worse, if possible than foreign tyranny.

At various premises in Dublin the committee supervised the manufacture and storage of weapons. In the anticipation of street fighting, there was considerable ingenuity: folding pikes that might be concealed under cloaks; gunpower-packed beams that could be rolled across the cobblestones against cavalry; various types of grenades. Meanwhile, Dowdall established hurling clubs as a cover for United Irish units to assemble and drill.

With the assistance of Anne Devlin (ostensibly Emmet's housekeeper), contact was made with Michael Dwyer, her cousin, who since the '98 rebellion had maintained a guerrilla force in the Wicklow Mountains. At two lengthy conferences at Emmet's home in Rathfarnham in April 1803, Dwyer, in return for arms, promised support. James Hope and Thomas Russell were dispatched to secure similar commitments from those they had previously organised and led in Antrim and Down.

== Conspiracy within a conspiracy? ==
Unlike in 1798, and until the accidental explosion of their arms depot in Patrick Street on 16 July, the conspirators appear to have successfully concealed their preparations. Recalling Henry Joy McCracken's caution that "the rich always betray the poor", in his Labour in Irish History (1910), James Connolly credits this to Emmet's reliance upon workers (and consequently on an organisation that was "more distinctly democratic"—even if more military in structure—than original United movement). But Emmet did take "persons of respectability" into his confidence. Indeed, he allowed John Petty, known as Earl Wycombe, the disaffected son of the former British prime minister, Lord Shelbourne, to view the arms depots.

Emmet may have suspected that some of these confidences were misplaced. To the historian R. R. Madden, Hope suggested that Emmet realised that "the men of rank and fortune" who had urged him to head a new rising had had ulterior motives, but that he nonetheless placed his confidence in the great mass of the people to rise.

Drawing on research in the 1880s by Dr. Thomas Addis Emmet of New York City, a grandson of Emmet's elder brother, biographer Helen Landreth believes that Chief Secretary for Ireland, William Wickham, and Under-Secretary Alexander Marsden, conspired with William Pitt, then out of office but anticipating his return as Prime Minister. They sought to encourage the most dangerously disaffected in Ireland to fatally compromise the prospects for an effective revolt by acting in advance of a French invasion. Landreth believes that Emmet was their unwitting instrument. He was drawn home from Paris for the purpose of organising a premature rising by the misrepresentations of William Putnam McCabe and Arthur O'Connor whom she suspected of being double agents. Her evidence, however, is entirely circumstantial, and appears to rely chiefly on Pitt's reputed cynicism with regard to the 1798 rebellion, which he anticipated as an occasion to further secure England's western flank through a legislative union.

Hope informed Madden that Russell had said:

This conspiracy is the work of the enemy, we are now in its vortex—if we can swim ashore let it not be through innocent blood; if the people are true to themselves, we have an overwhelming force; if otherwise, we fall and our lives will be a sufficient sacrifice.

Madden, however, understood "the enemy" not to be Pitt and his party, but precisely those in the Castle and Ascendancy who had helped force Pitt's resignation by opposing his commitment to include Catholic emancipation in the Acts of Union. Madden writes:

There were two government in Ireland in 1803; the all-powerful one of Orangeism ... managed by Mr [Alexander] Marsden; and the government of the viceroy, Lord Hardwicke; ostensibly administered by the chief secretary, Mr. [William] Wickham, but virtually controlled—shut out from a knowledge of all important facts supposed to be injurious to Orange interests ... by Mr Marsden.

The implication is that Marsden saw to it that the émigré United Irish were fed a "false picture of feeling around the country" in order to promote a rebellion that would strengthen the hand of Orange leaders in their "conflict of political attrition" with the potentially conciliatory British government.

== Proclamation of the Provisional Government ==
Emmet prepared a proclamation in the name of the "Provisional Government". Calling upon the Irish people "to show the world that you are competent to take your place among the nations . . . as an independent country", Emmet made clear in the proclamation that they would have to do so "without foreign assistance": "That confidence which was once lost by trusting to external support . . . has been again restored. We have been mutually pledged to each other to look only to our own strength".

The Proclamation also contained "allusions to the widening of the political agenda of Emmet and the United Irishmen following the failure of 1798". In addition to democratic parliamentary reform, the Proclamation announced that tithes were to be abolished and the land of the established Church of Ireland nationalised. At the same time, seeking to confirm an appeal across both class and sectarian divisions, it declared: "We are not against property – we war against no religious sect – we war not against past opinions or prejudices – we war against English dominion."

Assurances were also given that there should be no repeat of the outrages against loyalists that had occurred during the southern risings in 1798, and whose embellishment had done much to damage the United cause in the north. "Every appearance of plunder, intoxication or revenge" was to be avoided. The "nation alone" possessed the right to execute the death sentence. Russell offered the same in the proclamation he issued in the north: "any outrage contrary to the acknowledged laws of war, and of morality, shall be retaliated in the severest manner".

== 23 July 1803 ==
The alarm caused by the explosion at the Patrick Street arms depot on 16 July persuaded Emmet and a majority of the leadership to bring forward the date of the rising. Without further consideration of French aid, it was set for the evening of Saturday, 23 July, a festival day which could provide cover for the gathering of their forces.

=== Kildare ===
On the morning of 23 July 1803, emissaries from Kildare taken to view the Thomas Street depot in Dublin were impressed, not by the folding pikes, the grenades or rockets, but by the lack of serviceable firearms. Emmet could show them but a dozen blunderbusses and twelve cases of pistols. They left to turn back their men on the road to the city. In Kildare, a county which despite having been "up" in 1798 was spared by a locally negotiated amnesty from the "white terror" that followed, there had been hundreds, perhaps thousands, of men willing to act in support of a Dublin coup d'état. Shortly after his return from exile in March 1803, Michael Quigly, one of the Kildare leaders who had surrendered in July 1798, visited known United Irish veterans in Naas, Sallins, Rathcoffey, Prosperous, Timahoe and elsewhere and, according to the reports of local magistrates, was enthusiastically received. Sir Fenton Aylmer, a prominent local landowner, noted that "the peasantry of the County Kildare, in general, are determined to rise when they hear of a French invasion and join the enemy".

Without news either of the French or of developments in Dublin, on the evening of the 23rd about one hundred rebels gathered on the main street in Maynooth under the leadership of Owen Lyons, a shoemaker, Carter Connolly, a schoolteacher, and Thomas Kereghan, a farmer and Grand Canal boatman, all wearing green uniforms. They overpowered the only two soldiers stationed in the town and then set about searching for arms in the possession of local inhabitants. After the small rebel force had marched to Rathcoffey on the morning of the 24th in hope of meeting other insurgents, they learned the rebellion in Dublin had failed. With no possibility of success and few options, they finally surrendered in Maynooth on 25 July.

Meanwhile, there had been a similar muster on 23 July in Naas. The men, by some accounts numbering as many as 400, proceeded in small bands toward Dublin. Many, perhaps most, turned back, either because of the reported lack of arms or, possibly, rumours that the rebellion had been postponed or cancelled. Some, however, seem to have participated in the street skirmishing that occurred that night.

=== Dublin ===
In Dublin, on the evening of 23 July, the rebels were to seize strategic positions across the city and signal the regions to rise. These included the Pigeon House Fort, Islandbridge Barracks and the original Custom House (situated on modern-day Wellington Quay), but the key was Dublin Castle, since the lordship of King John the seat of English government in Ireland. Led by Emmet, armed rebels would enter the main gate of the lightly defended castle disguised in fine-liveried carriages as an aristocratic party, and Byrne, leading Wicklow and Wexford men, would force the Ship Street entrance. Together they would capture the Privy Council then in session.

At 9 in the evening, turned out in their gold-trimmed green uniforms, Emmet, Myles Byrne, Malachy Delaney, and Nicholas Stafford rendezvoused at the Thomas Street/Marshal Lane depot. Instead of the hundreds expected, at the depot they were greeted by just 80 men, and they learned that the approaching carriages had been abandoned in Bridgefoot Street after Henry Howley, in command, shot a soldier in a brawl. (Emmet later identified this misadventure as chief cause of the ensuing debacle).

To avoid what he now viewed as a useless shedding of blood, Emmet stood down sizeable rebel groups straddling the main suburban roads by pre-arranged signal, a solitary rocket. Shortly afterwards, anticipating an attack on their position, he brought his men, described by R.R. Madden as "a motley assemblage ... , a great number of whom were, if not intoxicated, under the evident excitement of drink", out onto the street. After witnessing them firing upon lamp posts and any other target that presented itself, and pulling a lone dragoon from his horse and piking him to death, Emmet tried and failed to get the men to disperse. He was unaware of the approach of a further 300 men, under command of John Allen. With a small party he effected a retreat to Rathfarnham in the hope of reaching the Wicklow Mountains.

Left behind in Thomas Street was a now leaderless mob. It was 9:45 pm and it was from this point, according to subsequent government inquiry, that "all atrocities" were committed. Their principal victim was Arthur Wolfe, Viscount Kilwarden, who had the misfortune to turn into the street. He was the Lord Chief Justice of Ireland, reviled as the Attorney General who authorised the execution of Laurence O'Connor and other Defenders in 1795, and as the chief prosecutor of William Orr in 1797. While his daughter was led to safety, Kilwarden was dragged from his carriage and hacked to death.

As Emmet approached Rathfarnham, his confederates Patrick McCabe, Owen Kirwan, Thomas Keogh and possibly Peter Finnerty were still in command of a total of at least 400 men in different parts of the city. At Ballsbridge, one group pressed pikes upon passers urging them to fight for their "country and liberty". Others fought skirmishes in the vicinity of the military barracks in Newmarket Street and in James Street. At midnight, three hours after the beginning of the action, the authorities, slow to acknowledge that the disorders amounted to armed rebellion, finally mobilised the military and drove the remaining rebels from the streets.

== The country does not stir ==
In his biography of Robert Emmet, Ruan O'Donnell observes that a "striking feature of the Rising of 1803 was the low level of unrest it excited around the country". Outside of Dublin and Kildare, few people appear to have stirred.

As events unfolded in Dublin, James Hope in County Antrim (where he had fought in '98), William Henry Hamilton in counties Fermanagh and Cavan, and Thomas Russell in Down proved unable to rekindle the republican spirit among Presbyterian tradesmen and tenant farmers or the fighting commitment of Catholic Defenders. The winter 1799–1800 had seen widespread return of flogging, arms raids and assassinations to rural east Ulster, proving that a will to resist had continued among a substantial element of the region's population. But in Antrim this appears to have been broken in March 1800 by a court martial of over 100 men in Ballymena. Sixteen were executed (with the body of the United Irishman, Thomas Archer, left to hang in an iron cage in terrorem for several months); 16 were flogged and transported; 23 were forced into exile, and 10 were condemned to serve in the army or the fleet. Meanwhile, James McGucken, a government agent, had manoeuvred himself into a position where he could control the likely rebels in Down. Confident that Emmet's efforts in Dublin were fatally compromised, he urged the Northern men not to stir until they saw the rising in the capital succeed.

Friends in Belfast, veterans of the struggle, cautioned Russell and Hope that there was no appetite for a further rising. This Russell himself confirmed when on the day of the rising in Dublin, and on the day following when still uncertain of its outcome, he attempted to raise the United Irish standard in Down. The few men who gathered to hear him in the north of the county protested that without the French, they would all hang "like dogs." Moving south into the heart of what had been Defender country, Russell, dressed in his green uniform, was greeted on a hill near Downpatrick by just three individuals, and of these one responded to Russell's promise of French arms with the suggestion (echoing Emmet) that Ireland might as well be an English colony, as a French one. Desperate to recruit support, in Annadorn and Loughinisland Russell is said to have played on anti-Orange sentiments, but with equally little effect.

On the night of the 23rd, suspect parties were sighted in different parts of Antrim: "numbers of people" moving towards Ballymena; "400-500 men at exercise" near Larne; men "at drill" in Carnmoney. But there was no engagement.

Absent news of some initial success, and the arms they had been promised, Michael Dwyer was reluctant to lead his men down from the Wicklow Mountains. It was reported that a signal rocket had been fired in Limerick, but the subsequent lack of activity suggested that no one was primed for its appearance. General Payne, the commander in Limerick, understood that large numbers in the southwest had been sworn to support the rebellion. But their "General", David Fitzgerald, and four of his lieutenants had sailed for France. In his absence, Fitzgerald's father appears to have played much the same role as McGucken in the north, in counselling delay.

== Aftermath ==
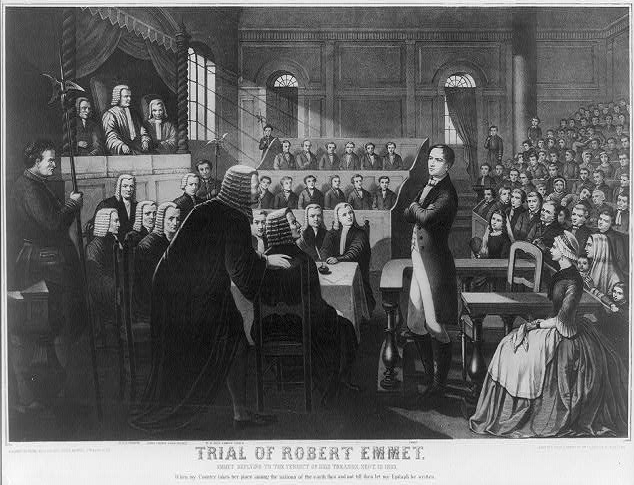
Depiction of Robert Emmet's trial

Emmet reached Rathfarnham an hour before midnight with a party of 16. When he heard that Wicklow men were still planning to rise, he issued a countermanding order to prevent needless violence. Instead, all else lost, he asked Myles Byrne to proceed to Paris to do all that he might, even now, to encourage an invasion.

Emmet was captured on 25 August, near Harold's Cross. He endangered his life by moving his hiding place from Rathfarnham to Harold's Cross so that he could be near his sweetheart, Sarah Curran. He was tried for treason on 19 September; the Crown repaired the weaknesses in its case by securing the assistance of Emmet's defence attorney, Leonard McNally (already an established informer) for £200 and a pension.

Emmet's Speech from the Dock after sentencing is especially remembered for its closing sentences. They helped secure his reputation among future generations of Irish republicans. The most commonly reported version reads:

Let no man write my epitaph; for as no man who knows my motives dare now vindicate them, let not prejudice or ignorance, asperse them. Let them and me rest in obscurity and peace, and my tomb remain un-inscribed, and my memory in oblivion, until other times and other men can do justice to my character. When my country takes her place among the nations of the earth, then and not till then, let my epitaph be written. I have done.

On 20 September, Emmet was executed in Thomas Street. He was hanged and then beheaded once dead. He had been preceded to the gallows by 14 of his confederates (tradesmen and labourers commemorated on a plaque at St. Catherine's church off Thomas Street). Six more were executed after Emmet's death, including Russell at Downpatrick.

After returning from the north, Russell managed to hide for a number of weeks in Dublin where he had hopes of organising Emmet's rescue. But the shocked authorities launched a martial-law dragnet of raids and arrests in which he was eventually caught. He was promptly sent to Downpatrick Gaol where he was swiftly tried and executed. Hundreds of rebels and suspected rebels were arrested in Kildare.

After the rising, Dwyer faced new and concerted efforts by the government to crush his guerrilla force in the Wicklow Mountains. In December 1803, after five years resistance, he finally capitulated on terms that would allow him safe passage to America. The government, instead, held him in Kilmainham Jail until August 1805 and then transported him to the penal colony of New South Wales (Australia). There, the year before, in March 1804, news of the rising in Dublin had stirred several hundred United Irish to mutiny in the hope of seizing ships for a return to Ireland. Poorly armed, and with their leader Philip Cunningham seized under a flag of truce, the main body of insurgents were routed in an encounter loyalists, recalling the defeat of the Wexford rebels in 1798, celebrated as the Second Battle of Vinegar Hill.

== Legacy ==
The Dublin Castle authorities had no wish for Westminster to know that a wide-ranging republican conspiracy had been hatched under their noses. Lord Castlereagh, author of the Union that was supposed to address the challenges of Irish governance, advised them that "the best thing would be to go into no detail whatever upon the case [against Emmet] to keep the subject clearly standing on its own narrow base of a contemptible insurrection without means or respectable leaders". In what was widely viewed as an unnecessary attack on a doomed man Emmet's prosecutor, William Plunket, took pains to portray him as the deluded leader of a conspiracy encompassing "the bricklayer, the old clothes man, the hodman and the hostler".

At the same time, and notwithstanding that the rebellion was led largely by Protestants, many in authority were quick to associate it with Catholic disloyalty. That a rebel muster had occurred close the Catholic seminary at Maynooth, was made a point of an official inquiry, and of ill-founded allegations of clerical complicity. (The only association with the college appears to have been the intervention of its French-born professor of natural philosophy, André Darré. He helped negotiate the surrender of the local rebels on 25 July).

In the north, although Catholic Defenders had been equally loath to commit themselves, the failure of Presbyterians to respond to the entreaties of Hope and Russell was celebrated as evidence of Protestant commitment to the Union. In October 1803, the judge who conducted Russell's trial noted with satisfaction that Ulster Presbyterians had "got into their heads that the present scheme of rebellion has originated with the papists exclusively, and that idea, together with a conviction that should Bonaparte succeed in his designs, there will be no republic, but on the contrary, despotism and pillage, secures their support in the present crisis".

Historian Thomas Bartlett concludes that the portrayal of the rebellion as a "popish affair" marked the abandonment by the government of any attempt "to govern Ireland on 'Union principles'", and a reaffirmation of the Ascendancy view of the Catholic majority as congenitally unfit for the exercise of British liberties. Widespread and continued agrarian unrest was seen as a product, not of misgovernment and poverty, but rather of a quality "rooted" in the Irish (Catholic) character.

Daniel O'Connell who led the struggle for Catholic Emancipation and for repeal of the Union in the decades that followed, denied all connection to the United Irish rebellions, roundly condemning the resort to "physical force". He remained content with his dismissal of Emmett in 1803 as an instigator of bloodshed who had forfeited any claim to "compassion".

For their rehabilitation, Emmet and the men in 1803 had to await a later generation of Irish republicans. Patrick Pearse, who in 1916 was next to proclaim a provisional government in Dublin, declared that the 1803 rising had "redeemed Ireland from acquiescence in the Union". The attempt had been "not a failure, but a triumph for that deathless thing we call Irish Nationality".

== Leading figures ==
- John Allen
- Myles Byrne
- Malachy Delaney
- Anne Devlin
- Michael Dwyer
- William Dowdall
- Robert Emmet
- Peter Finnerty
- William Henry Hamilton
- James Hope
- Henry Howley
- William Putnam McCabe
- Michael Quigley
- Thomas Russell
- Nicholas Stafford
- Thomas Wright
- Thomas Wylde

== See also ==
- List of monuments and memorials to the Irish Rebellion of 1803
