= William Sampson (lawyer) =

Irish-American lawyer

- Engraving by F. Grimbede from Memoirs of William Sampson, 2nd edition, 1817
- Born: 26 January 1764; Derry, Ireland
- Died: 28 December 1836 (aged 72); New York City, New York, United States
- Occupation: Lawyer
- Organization: New York Manumission Society
- Political party: Democratic-Republican Party
- Movement: Society of United Irishmen
- Spouse: Grace Clark
- Children: William, John, and Catherine Anne

William Sampson (26 January 1764 – 28 December 1836) was a lawyer and jurist who in his native Ireland, and in later American exile, identified with the cause of democratic reform. In the 1790s, in Belfast and Dublin he associated with United Irishmen, defending them in Crown prosecutions, contributing to their press and, according to government informants, participating on the eve of rebellion in their inner councils. In New York, from 1806 he won renown as a trial lawyer representing the abolitionist Manumission Society and disputing race as a legal disability; challenging the conspiracy charges against organised labor; and, in the name of religious liberty, establishing Catholic auricular confession as privileged. Maintaining that the tradition of common law denied citizens equal access to the law, and was a systematic source of injustice, Sampson pioneered the American codification movement.

== Early life ==
Sampson was born in Derry, in the Kingdom of Ireland, to Mary Spaight Sampson and Arthur Sampson, an Anglican clergyman. He attended Trinity College Dublin and after studying law at Lincoln's Inn, in London, he was admitted to the Irish bar in 1792. He settled in Belfast where he served as Junior Counsel to John Philpot Curran in the north-east circuit.

In 1790 he married Grace Clarke of Belfast, whose parents, the Rev. John Clarke and Catherine Anne Clarke (née Coates), were early members of the Belfast Society for Promoting Knowledge. With his wife's brother-in-law, the physician and polymath James MacDonnell, he had a mutual friend in the Society's librarian, the future republican martyr Thomas Russell.

== Counsel for United Irishmen, agitator and exile ==
William Sampson, self portrait circa 1785

=== Counsel and radical pamphleteer ===
In 1782, while at Trinity, Sampson was commissioned in the Irish Volunteers. That year, seizing on the occasion of the American War of Independence, the militia movement helped free the Irish Parliament from direct dictation from London. But it failed in what for many Volunteers, particularly in the Presbyterian north-east, was their chief object: to break the monopoly hold upon the parliament of the landed Anglican interest—"the Protestant Ascendancy".

In 1791, when rallying in celebration of the French revolution (Bastille Day), Volunteers in Belfast proposed a political "union" between Protestants of all persuasions and the kingdom's dispossessed and disenfranchised Catholic majority. While acknowledging himself, as a member of the established Anglican communion, to be "of the favoured cast[e]", Sampson embraced the cause. In a succession of cases, with John Philpot Curran, he was to represent the United Irishmen against charges of criminal libel, sedition and treason.

Sampson published anonymous reports of the trials, and contributed to the United Irish paper in Belfast, the Northern Star. Writing as "Fortesque", he urged judicial independence from the Crown. As a preface to demands for still greater change, with Thomas Russell he dispensed with the reformer's usual praise for the celebrated charters of English liberty: Magna Carta, the Bill of Rights and Habeas Corpus. In their Review of the Lion of Old England; or Democracy Confounded (1794) (dedicated to the reputedly enlightened "Empress of all the Russias", Catherine II), they suggested that, honoured in the breach in Ireland, the invocation of these charters did little more than "amuse the masses".

In The Trial of Hurdy Gurdy (1794), serialised in the Northern Star, Sampson and Russell pilloried the Crown's suppression of dissent: a barrel organ is charged with playing a seditious tune, Ça Ira. "The King versus Hurdy Gurdy" parodied recent events: the playing of popular radical songs on a hurdy gurdy had been cited in Edinburgh as evidence supporting the transportation (to Botany Bay) of the Scots radical (and honorary United Irishman) Thomas Muir; and in Belfast Ça Ira had triggered a military riot.

Sampson claimed to have taken the United Irish Test (a pledge composed by his friend William Drennan) only in open court and then only to show that its purpose was reform—"the attainment of an impartial and adequate representation of the Irish nation in parliament"—not treason. In Advice to the Rich (1796), he urged the Ascendancy to embrace reform, and prove "by fact and experiment" rather than "idle rhapsodies" that the constitution tended to promote public happiness". But with the Crown at war with the French Republic, all avenues of "experiment" were closed. Sampson's clients turned increasingly toward the prospect of a French-assisted insurrection. In 1795, with Curran, he represented the Rev. William Jackson, an emissary to the United Irishmen from the French Directory. Convicted of treason, the preacher and playwright collapsed and died in the dock.

=== Agitator and suspect ===
When on New Years Day 1797, news reached Belfast of a French fleet appearing off Bantry Bay, Sampson addressed an open-air town meeting. Rather than profess loyalty to the Crown, he decried the disarming of the Volunteers and condemned the licentiousness of the "English mercenaries" garrisoning the town. Drennan expressed his astonishment—that Sampson should "leap upon a joint-stool and harangue the populace, at such a time and on such a topic, with such temper, and near such a body of military"—and proposed that he was the "most active" man in Ireland. Months before, after dining with the Duke of Leinster at a militia camp at Loughlinstown, he had given a further illustration of "the reckless character of his zeal" by privately scattering radical tracts and patriotic songs among the huts.

In October 1797, Sampson helped establish a rallying cry for the movement (and for the coming rebellion): "Remember Orr!". Having failed to secure an acquittal for William Orr on the capital charge of administering the United test to soldiers, Sampson published sensational reports of the trial and execution (including Orr's declaration from the scaffold, in which his defence counsel may have had some hand). These appeared in The Press, a new paper he had established in Dublin with Arthur O'Connor, Drennan and others (the presses of the Northern Star in Belfast having been smashed by the military). From Drennan's pen, the paper also published a poem, then widely circulated, The Wake of William Orr, and a letter (signed "Marcus") which excoriated the Viceroy, Lord Camden, for having in Orr's execution disgraced the laws. Charges of seditious libel were brought against the nominal owner of the paper, the journalist Peter Finnerty, and the printer, John Stockdale. In court, Sampson and Curran struck reporters less as defence counsel than as prosecutors pressing the indictment of the government.

Dublin Castle was aware that Sampson was preparing further embarrassment. He was collecting affidavits detailing atrocities committed by the military as they sought to break up and disarm the United Irishmen and their Defender allies. While broadcasting their content in pamphlets and the Press, he was supplying these to the liberal Lord Moira who in turn sought to present them to the King. But, critically, a key informant was now placing Sampson, alongside O'Connor, at meetings of the Leinster (Dublin) Directory of the movement, and this at a time when the discussion was clearly of armed insurrection.

Sampson's response to the execution in May 1797 of four militia men who had refused to renounce their oath to the United Irishmen and betray their comrades—his widely circulated, ballad, Death before Dishonour—had concluded with a clarion call to arms:

Irish heroes grasp your arms,
Firmly clasp the pointed steel,
Shake their souls with fierce alarms,
Teach their harden'd hearts to feel.

Let the tyrants of the world
See their hateful reign is o'er;
From their seats let them be hurl'd,
Nor wield their iron sceptre more.

In March 1798, Sampson was charged with high treason.

=== Arrest and exile ===
In April 1798, a month in advance of the United Irish uprisings, Sampson (rumoured by loyalists to hold a major-general's commission in the French army) escaped to England, but was returned to Dublin where, under the Banishment Act, he was permitted exile. Barred from the United States by President John Adams, whose Federalist administration was wary of importing "Jacobins", he travelled to Portugal. There, in March 1799, he was arrested by order of the English minister on the misapprehension that he was the author of a pamphlet circulating in Ireland protesting the country's incorporation in a united kingdom with Great Britain—following the failed rebellion, the government's settled policy.

In May 1799, he was sent to France, where, nursing a quiet disdain for Napoleon's new imperial regime, he lived under close police surveillance. Having been reunited in Paris, in May 1805 his family departed for Hamburg, and from there, in advance of Napoleon's troops, passed across to England. After again arresting Sampson, the government paid for his passage to the United States, now under the more welcoming presidency of Thomas Jefferson. On 4 July 1806, he arrived in New York City where he was met and assisted by fellow exiles Thomas Addis Emmet and William James MacNeven. He was admitted to the New York bar in October. His wife, son, and daughter joined him in 1810.

In 1807, he published Memoirs of William Sampson, including particulars of his adventures in various parts of Europe; his confinement in the dungeons of the inquisition in Lisbon, &c., &c. Several original letters; being his correspondence with the ministers of state in Great-Britain and Portugal; a short sketch of the history of Ireland, particularly as it respects the spirit of British domination in that country; and a few observations on the state of manners &c., in America.

== Lawyer and advocate in New York ==
=== Disputing race as a legal disability ===
In New York City, Sampson set up a business publishing accounts of the court proceedings in cases with popular appeal and which advanced arguments for reform. Sometimes he filled the role of both counsel and reporter. This was the case in two proceedings in which Sampson, representing the New York Manumission Society, upended precedents anchored in racism and in slavery: The Commissioners of the Almshouse v Alexander Whistelo (1808), involving a black man in a case of paternity; and Amos and Demis Broad (1809) in which Sampson succeeded in having sadistically abused slaves, a mother and her 3-year-old daughter, manumitted.

In the Broad case, Sampson lamented that the law kept the woman from testifying on her own behalf: "the silence which fate, for I will not call it law, imposes on the slave who cannot tell us of his own complaint; gagged, and reduced to a state of a dumb brute ... [is a] weighty obstacle to justice".

In 1808, in a case in which he had occasion to defend "interracial" marriage, he noted that, "every man must follow his own pleasure ... neither philosophy nor religion have forbade such mixtures."

=== Labor's right of association ===
In 1810, Sampson published Trial of the Journeymen Cordwainers of the City of New-York for a Conspiracy to Raise Their Wages, presenting his (unsuccessful) argument in The People v Melvin (1806) for quashing an indictment of unionising workers. Insisting on the supremacy of the elected legislature, Sampson's objected that the prosecution was reasoning "abstractedly" from principles of English common law without any reference to statute. It was this, alone, that allowed them to deny journeymen the right to "conspire against starvation" while, without notice or challenge, leaving master tradesmen in a "permanent conspiracy" to suppress wages. This was one of the earliest attempts in the United States to establish the legality of the labor closed shop.

=== "Friend of Religious and Civil Liberty" ===
In The Catholic Question in America (1813), Sampson reported on his success in People v. Phillips in maintaining that a Catholic priest, who had arranged restitution for a parishioner' theft, could not be made to compromise sacramental confession by identifying the culprit. With Richard Riker switching from the prosecution to join Sampson.in the view that, until acting "counter to the fundamental principles of morality", men are to be "protected in the free exercise of their religion", the court ruled for the defence, recognising priest-penitent privilege.

Historians of American Catholicism regard Philips as a "signal victory for religious, ethnic, and cultural equality". Against the backdrop of nativist protest against Catholic-Irish immigration, in his report Sampson had felt it necessary to dispose of popular misconceptions of Catholic doctrine, and to remind Americans of "the superior equity and wisdom" of their jurisprudence by recalling Ireland's anti-Catholic Penal Laws in which "all the principles of law [were] reversed".

In 1824, he and Thomas Addis Emmet, again supported by Riker, defended Irish weavers in Greenwich Village, charged with riot in a 12th of July confrontation with local Orangemen. As he had in Philips, Sampson took the opportunity to decry religious bigotry and to put Britain's resistance to complete Catholic Emancipation, on trial.

In anticipation of Daniel O'Connell's victory at Westminster (the King signed the Catholic Relief Act ending the Protestant monopoly on parliament a month later), on St. Patrick's Day, 1829, Sampson and MacNeven convened the "Friends of Religious and Civil Liberty" in Tammany Hall. The banqueting members were told they had gathered for same purpose that drew "good men of all nations and creeds" together in protesting the "enslavement of the Africans". The same connection (upon which, O'Connell, an ardent abolitionist, had himself insisted) had been confirmed for Sampson by France's leading abolitionist, Abbé Henri Grégoire. Via his translator, David Bailie Warden (a veteran of the 1798 rebellion in County Down), Grégoire had communicated his high praise for Sampson's achievement in Phillips.

In 1831, Sampson had further occasion in Philadelphia to defend Catholics charged in an affray with Orangemen. It elicited the clearest statement of his republican conception of American citizenship. The American Orangemen think that the Catholics have "got into a Protestant country", but their republic, he argued, is "equally a Jewish country, a Seceding country, a fire worshiping country": it is "a country that tolerates all religions".

== Father of the American Codification movement ==
The French-American jurist Peter S. Du Ponceau described Sampson as "the Patriarch" of the American Codification movement. In his parody of "The King v Hurdy Gurdy" (which he had re-published on his arrival in New York), the need to reason from precedent allows the judge to usurp the function of both jurors (forbidden even to reason about the facts) and of legislators. In these apprehensions, Sampson was supported by the frequently sued publisher of the Philadelphia Aurora, William Duane. In Sampson Against the Philistines (1805), Duane argued that, "dark, arbitrary, unwritten, incoherent ... and contradictory", the common law allows judges "not simply to administer the law, but [to] exercise a legislative and even an executive power directly in defiance and contempt of the Constitution". He proposed that, conversely, a general codified law of reference would be "justice made cheap, speedy, and brought home to every man's door".

In the Trial of the Journeymen Cordwainers (1810), Sampson rehearsed the same general argument: an "indiscriminating adoption of common law" had caused the New-World society to carry over "barbarities" from the Old: laws that "can only be executed upon those not favoured by fortune with certain privileges" and that in some cases operate "entirely against the poor". "The more I reflect upon the advantages this nation has gained by independence," he concluded, "the more I regret that one thing should still be wanting to crown the noble arch—a NATIONAL CODE".

Sampson's summary Discourse on the Common Law (1823), holding common law to be contrary to the ethos a democratic republic and urging, with reference to the Code Napoleon, its replacement by a general law of reference, was hailed as "the most sweeping indictment of common law idealism ever written in America". Widely reported in the newspaper and periodical press, it had a decided impact on public opinion. It was a source of inspiration for Edward Livingston who drew upon French, and other European, civil law in drafting the 1825 Louisiana Code of Procedure. Later, Sampson's efforts appeared vindicated in New York where in 1846 a new state constitution directed that the whole body of state law be reduced to a written and systematic code, and in David Dudley Field's subsequent drafting of the New York Code of Civil Procedure (1848).

The call for legal reform had not swayed the leaders of Jefferson's Democratic-Republican Party, in whose east-coast city electoral successes he, Duane and other Irish émigrés had played a significant role. Sampson sought to disassociate codification from the doctrinaire insistence on positive legislation that had marked Jeremy Bentham's championing of the cause. But, focussing on the French experience, critics thought it sufficient to comment on the futility of trying to compress human behaviour into rigid categories. Jefferson had remained neutral when Duane's attempted to force the issue in the 1805 election in Pennsylvania. Federalists joined with "Constitutional Republicans" to defeat the reform agenda.

== Opposition to Andrew Jackson and Tammany Hall ==
Despite the lack of support for legal reform, Sampson did not follow Duane and other radical elements within the dissolving Jeffersonian coalition into the Democratic Party of Andrew Jackson. Jackson stood both for the western expansion of slavery and in opposition to the policies Sampson believed necessary for the development of America's free-labor economy. In 1817–19, Sampson lobbied in Washington against the opposition of southern planters for protective import tariffs against foreign, mainly British, manufactured goods.

In 1833, protesting the decision of Jackson (and his Secretary of the Treasury, Duane's son, William John Duane) to withdraw funds from the Second Bank of the United States, Sampson ran, unsuccessfully, for Congress. He was overwhelmed by the ability of the Tammany Hall Democratic Party machine to deliver the greater part of the growing Irish, and broader immigrant, vote.

An indication of his diminished standing as a veteran United Irishman among the city's increasingly Catholic Irish community was the controversy surrounding his and MacNeven's decision in 1829 to raise a monument (at St. Paul's Chapel, Broadway) to their departed compatriot Thomas Addis Emmet and to do so, in part, with funds unused from those they had collected to support the final act of Catholic emancipation in the Ireland (Catholic entry to the Westminster Parliament). They found themselves denounced by the community's principal paper, the Irish Shield, as presumptuous and oligarchic and for failing in their gratitude toward Daniel O'Connell, the "Emancipator", to whom a monument was truly due.

== Last years and death ==
In 1832, with some additions from the Irish Whig historian William Cooke Taylor, Sampson produced a third edition of his memoirs: Memoirs of William Sampson, an Irish Exile, written by himself; including particulars of his adventures in various parts of Europe, his confinement in the dungeons of the inquisition &c., &c. to which is added a brief historical sketch of the British connexion [sic] with Ireland and some observations on the present condition of America. In 1833, he in turn contributed notes for Taylor's two-volume History of Ireland from the Anglo-Norman invasion till the union of the country with Great Britain.

Tended, as his physician, by William MacNeven, William Sampson died in December 1836. He was buried in the Riker Family graveyard on Long Island in what is now East Elmhurst, Queens, New York. The white marble tomb, erected by his wife, Grace, and daughter, Catherine, bore an inscription describing him as "An United Irishman [who] defended the cause of civil and religious liberty". He was later reinterred in Green-Wood Cemetery in Brooklyn, New York, where he is now buried in the same plot as Catherine's husband William Theobald Wolfe Tone and his mother Matilda Witherington Tone, the son and wife of the Irish revolutionary Wolfe Tone.

His son, John Philpot Curran Sampson, Deputy Attorney General in Louisiana, pre-deceased him in 1820.

== Selected writing ==
- With Thomas Russell, Review of the Lion of Old England; or Democracy Confounded, Belfast: 1794.
- Advice to the Rich, Belfast and Dublin: 1796
- With Thomas Russell, A faithful report of the trial of Hurdy-Gurdy, tried and convicted of a seditious libel in the court of King's Bench ...,, Dublin: Bernard Dornin, 1806
- Memoirs of William Sampson . . . with a brief view of Irish History, New York: George Forman, 1807.
- Trial of the Journeymen Cordwainers of the City of New-York for a Conspiracy to Raise Their Wages, New York: I Riley, 1810
- The Catholic Question in America, whether a Roman Catholic Clergyman be in any case compellable to disclose the secrets of Auricular Confession New York: Edward Gillespy, 1813.
- An Anniversary Discourse: Delivered Before the Historical Society of New York, on the Common Law, New York: E Bliss and White, 1823.
- Memoirs of William Sampson, an Irish Exile, London : Whittaker, Treacher, and Arnot, 1832.

== See also ==
- Theobald Wolfe Tone
- Thomas Addis Emmet
