= Anne Devlin =

Irish republican (1780–1851)

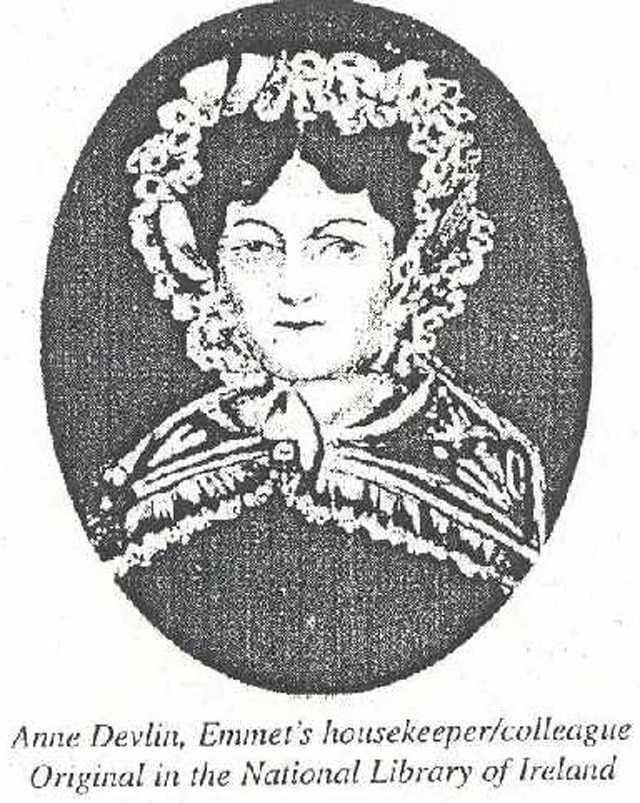
- Portrait of Anne Devlin
- Born: 1780; Rathdrum, County Wicklow, Ireland
- Died: 18 September 1851 (aged 70–71); The Liberties, Dublin, Ireland
- Resting place: Glasnevin Cemetery, Dublin, Ireland
- Occupation: Patriot
- Known for: United Irish rebel

Anne Devlin (1780 – 18 September 1851) was an Irish republican who in 1803, while his ostensible housekeeper, conspired with Robert Emmet, and with her cousin, the rebel outlaw Michael Dwyer to renew the United Irish insurrection against the British Crown. When their plans for a rising in Dublin, the Irish capital, misfired, she endured torture and imprisonment. Outrage over her treatment secured her release in 1806, after which she was assisted for a period by the Emmet family. A long working life as a laundress ended in destitution.

== Revolutionary involvement ==
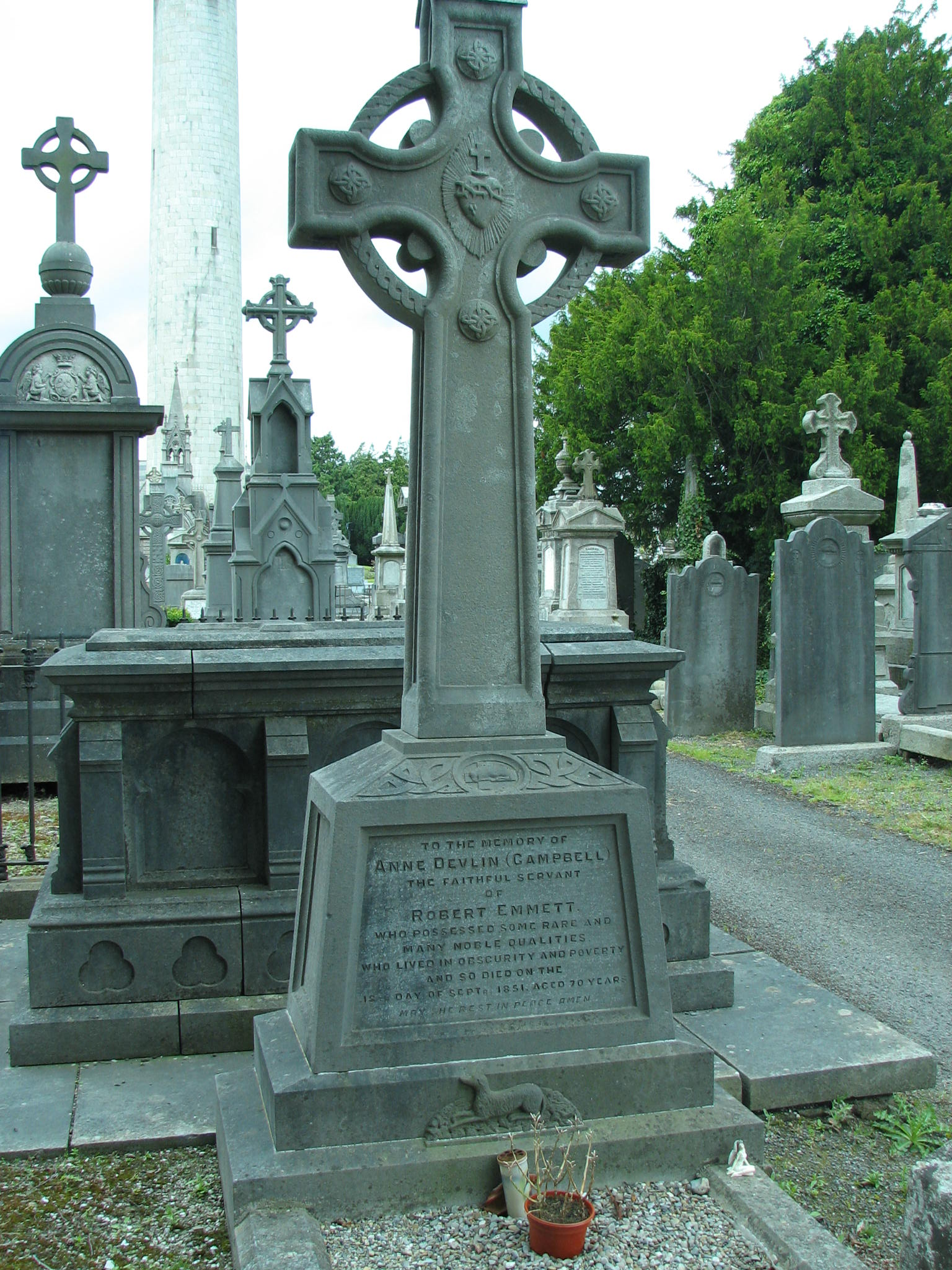
Grave of Anne Devlin, Glasnevin, Dublin

Devlin was born in Cronebeg near Aughrim in County Wicklow to Wynnie Byrne and Bryan Devlin. The family later moved onto a 13 hectares (32 acres) farm outside Rathdrum where her father was able to take a sub-lease despite the Protestant-only covenant of the land owner, the earls of Strafford.

Winning the confidence of Lord Strafford, in 1796 her parents secured a position for Anne as a maid in the household of his sister-in-law in Dublin. Reacting to the government's violent suppression of United Irish agitation (in which her mistress's brother-in-law, Edward Heppenstall, a militia lieutenant, was to earn the sobriquet the "Walking Gallows"), her father called her home. When the rebellion commenced in May 1798, Anne was working as a kitchenmaid for the Manning family in nearby Corbalis Castle, and neither she nor her family took any part. Anne, however, remained in contact with her cousin, Michael Dywer who led a guerrilla force in the Wicklow Mountains and, defiantly, she helped re-inter and bury the bodies of executed rebels. In 1799, notwithstanding that he continued throughout the rebellion to farm and pay his rent, her father was arrested and held for two and a half years in Wicklow Gaol dependent on his daughter's bi-weekly visits for food and clothing.

After her father's release in May 1801, the Devlins left Wicklow for Rathfarnham, County Dublin. It was there Anne met Robert Emmet, recently returned from France and was now the leader of a new, secret, United Irish directorate. Her father had offered Emmet the shelter of his own home, but Emmet preferred leasing a house in nearby Butterfield Lane. In order to lend the arrangement the appearance of a gentleman's residence, he did accept the offer, first of her sister Julie but then, as she had not the courage, of Anne, to play the role of housekeeper. Emmet paid her nothing. "She is one of ours", Emmet famously said when United men calling at the house refused to discuss their plans in front of her.

Devlin helped Emmet and James Hope arrange meetings at Rathfarnham in April 1803 with her cousin Dwyer. In return for arms (which, in the event, Emmet proved unable to deliver), Dwyer promised to lead his men down from the Wicklow Mountains in support of the rebels in the capital. She also involved herself the preparations for the insurrection in the city, helping to move arms and supplies from the Dublin headquarters on Butterfield Lane to rebel positions in other parts of the city.

Although the rising in Dublin on the evening of 23 July seemed to have taken the authorities by surprise, the lack of support among the unprepared population and confusion in the rebel ranks led to its collapse and disintegration into a night of bloody street clashes. Shortly after the rising was quashed, a detachment of yeomanry arrived at Butterfield Lane, seizing Anne and her eight-year-old sister. Anne was interrogated, including with the use of half-hanging but, finding out little of consequence, the yeomanry eventually departed. Shortly after returning to live in her family home in Rathfarnham the entire family was seized by government forces, having been informed on by a neighbour.

== Arrest and imprisonment ==
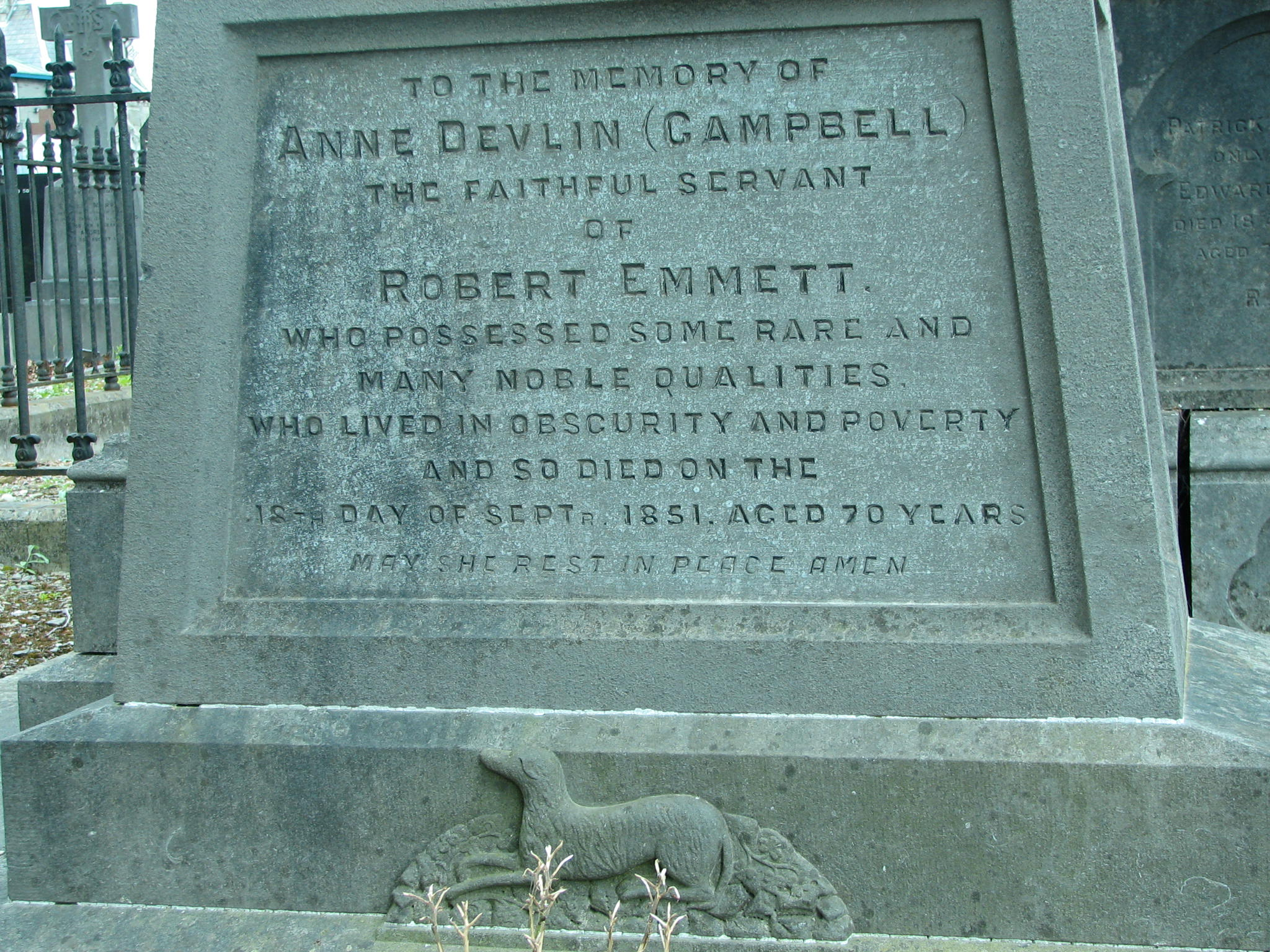
Headstone of Anne Devlin, Glasnevin, Dublin

Her importance and central role in the conspiracy was noted and Devlin was interrogated in Dublin Castle by Henry Charles Sirr (the Dublin police chief who in 1798 had fired the fatal shot in the arrest of Lord Edward Fitzgerald). Resisting both threats and inducements to inform on Emmet, she was taken to Kilmainham Gaol, where Emmet, who was offering no defence in his own case, urged her to testify against him in order to save herself. In addition to her own brutal treatment, her entire family was jailed in an effort to break her resulting in the illness and death of her nine-year-old brother. But she consistently refused to cooperate.

In the hope of removing her from a list of state prisoners at Kilmainham being considered for release, in 1806 her jailer Trevor Edward had her removed to the tower of Dublin Castle. There, thanks to a persistence of a friend, she was visited by the new Irish Chief Secretary, Charles Long. Appalled at finding Devlin so poorly she was scarcely able to move, he had her released.

== Later life and reminiscences ==
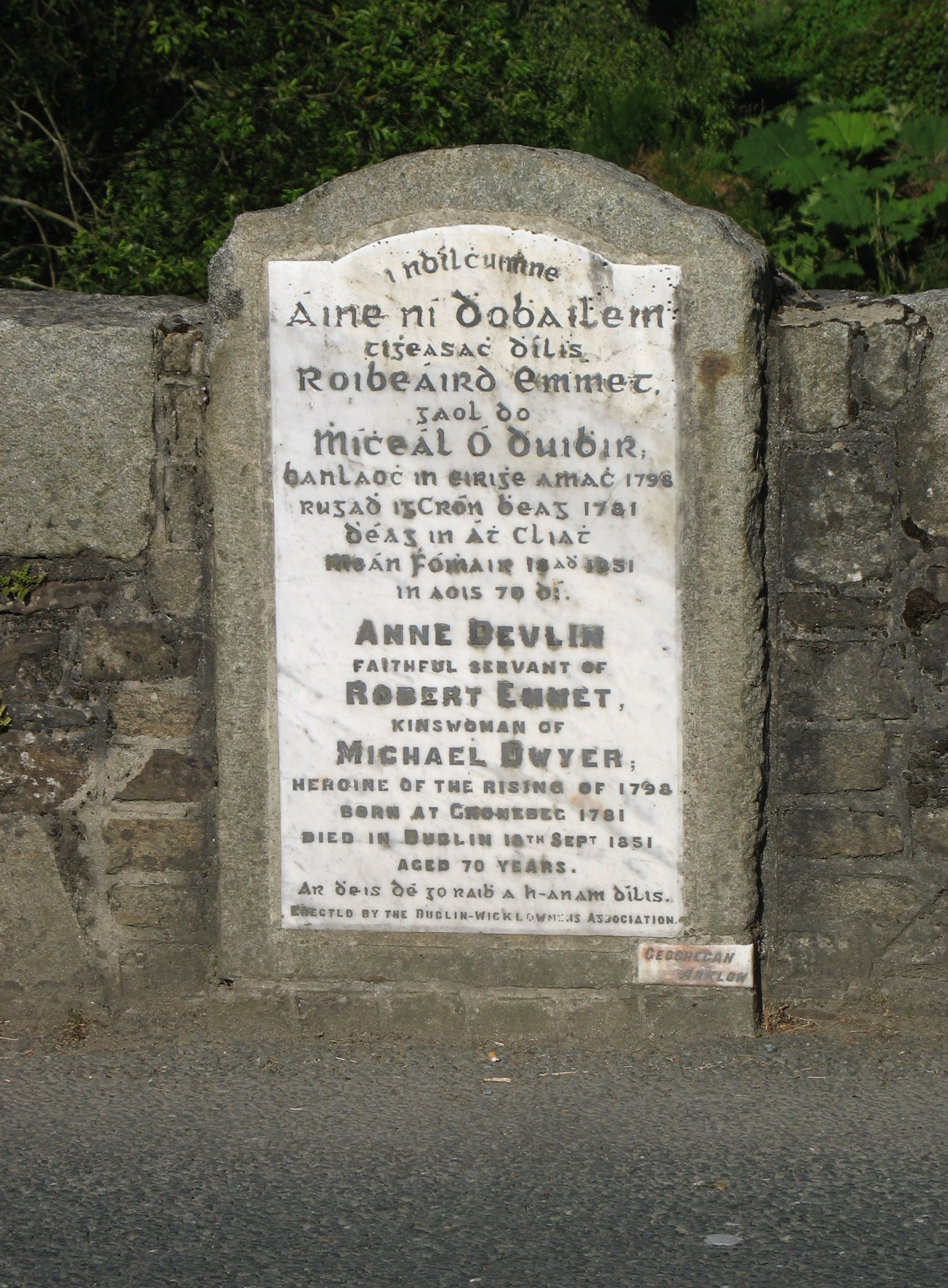
Plaque in Devlin's memory in Aughrim, County Wicklow

After her release from prison in 1806, Devlin was found starving in a Dublin slum by a Church of Ireland Clergyman, the Reverend Gamble, who brought her to Mrs. Hammond. Anne lived for five years at No. 20 Sir John Rogerson's Quay as housekeeper and companion to Elizabeth Hammond, until the latter's death in 1810. Mr. John Hammond and Elizabeth Fisher Hammond were friends of the Emmet family. She is likely the Anne Devlin who in 1835 is recorded as being employed by St Patrick's Hospital Dublin as a laundress but, exceptionally, with the status and pay of an "officer" of the institution. She may have been indebted again to the Emmets—Dr Robert Emmet, had served for over thirty years (1770-1803) as governor, physician and treasurer of St Patrick's — or possibly to a connection between her husband from 1811, a drayman William Campbell, and Patrick and Sarah Campbell who were respectively the master and matron of the hospital.

During this period, in 1830, Devlin was extensively interviewed by the Carmelite brother and collector of reminiscences of the rebellions of 1798 and 1803, Luke Cullen. His transcriptions, held by the National Library of Ireland, were first edited by John J. Finegan and published in 1968 as The Anne Devlin Jail Journal. There is no record of Devlin herself having taken part in any further political action or agitation.

In the late 1830s, records show that the hospital replaced "Anne Devlin" with a laundress employed at a fraction of her cost. When the historian R. R. Madden (who had corresponded with Cullen) found Devlin in 1842 she was taking washing into her home (off Thomas Street) and was in chronically poor health. A collection of £5 raised by the Young Irelander paper The Nation, and doled out to her in half-crowns, did not arrest a slide into destitution. Her husband, with whom she had two children, died in 1845, and her death in a tenement in the Liberties area of Dublin—it is suspected, partly of malnutrition—is recorded six years later

Devlin is buried in Glasnevin Cemetery to which her remains were removed from a pauper's grave, by Madden and friends in 1852 (in Belfast he had performed a similar service for James Hope). The grave was subsequently marked by a large Celtic cross on her grave, and is in the care of the National Graves Association.

There has been a memorial service held for Anne Devlin in St. Catherine's Church, Meath Street, Dublin every year since 2005, on a Sunday near the date of her death, organised by Mícheál Ó Doibhilín originally and now continued by Cuimhní Anne Devlin.

Devlin is today commemorated in Rathfarnham by a statue and a road 'Anne Devlin Park'

In May 2026, members of the Revolutionary Housing League occupied the former Ardee House pub in Dublin's Liberties, renaming it the Anne Devlin Community Centre. Although activists described the building as long-vacant, the site was owned by Black Sheep Investments and was the subject of redevelopment plans, including a proposed apartment development with a community facility. An earlier planning application had been unsuccessful, and a revised application was submitted shortly after the occupation became public.

== Literature and Film ==
There are grounds for believing that in his short story in the Dubliners (1914), “A Mother”, Devlin served James Joyce as a model for Mrs Kearney. While scarcely of Anne Devlin's stature or importance, Mrs Kearney (née Devlin) is nonetheless presented as a heroic figure—a woman, committed to the national cause, whose "shabby treatment by other Dubliners serves both to indict them and to evoke the reader's sympathy".

Stepping away from the nationalist hagiography that has surrounded the memory of Robert Emmet, the Irish feminist filmmaker Pat Murphy employs the figure of Anne Devlin in an implicit criticism of a patriotic politics that operates "largely at the level of signs and representations". In one scene of her film drama Anne Devlin (1984), Emmet enters a room as Devlin is holding up his splendid green uniform in front of a mirror. Asked what she thinks of it, Devlin replies that it looks like a green version of an English Redcoat, and will be seen "a mile off". "We should", she argues, "be rebel as ourselves’".

The film starred Bosco Hogan as Robert Emmet and Brid Brennan as Anne Devlin, and was entered into the 14th Moscow International Film Festival.

.
