= Florence Mary Wilson =

Florence Mary Wilson may refer to:

- Florence Austral (1892–1968), Australian operatic soprano, born Florence Mary Wilson
- Florence Mary Wilson (writer) (1870–1946), poet
