= James Hope (Ireland) =

Irish radical and insurrectionist (1764–1847)

James "Jemmy" Hope
- Born: 1764; Templepatrick, County Antrim, Ireland
- Died: 1847 (aged 82–83); Belfast, Ireland
- Occupations: Weaver, Revolutionary
- Movement: Irish Volunteers, Society of United Irishmen

James "Jemmy" Hope (25 August 1764 – 10 February 1847) was a radical democrat in Ireland who organised among labourers, tradesmen and tenant farmers for the Society of the United Irishmen. In the Rebellion of 1798 he fought alongside Henry Joy McCracken at the Battle of Antrim. In 1803 he attempted to renew the insurrection against the British Crown in an uprising coordinated by Robert Emmett and the new republican directorate in Dublin. Among United Irishmen, Hope was distinguished by his conviction that "the fundamental question at issue between the rulers and the people" was "the condition of the labouring class".

== Early life and family ==
Hope was born in Mallusk (parish of Templepatrick), County Antrim. His father, John Hope, a Scottish highlander and linen weaver, had emigrated from Scotland rather than compromise his Presbyterian Covenanter faith.

At age ten Hope was hired on a nearby farm. On winter evenings his master would make him sit "while he read in the Histories of Greece and Rome, and also Ireland, Scotland and England." Hope recalls that, together with comments on the news of the day, this turned his attention "early to the nature of the relations between the different classes of society". Labouring on the land, at a time when in Antrim the tenant Hearts of Steel led a violent resistance into the exactions of the largely Anglican landlords, Hope came to believe that "The Most High is lord of the soil; the cultivator is his tenant". Landlords who interceded in this relationship were oppressors.

Hope was later apprenticed as a linen weaver, then as a journeyman, while continuing his education at night classes. He married Rose Mullan, the daughter of a master weaver. Her brother, Luke Mullan, was a United Irishman. They had 4 surviving children, Luke Mullan Hope (1794–1827), editor of the Rushlight, Henry Joy McCracken Hope (1809–1872), writer of some religious verse, Robert Emmet Hope (1812–1864) and a daughter, Mathilda Hope. Rose died on 25 May 1831. Hope described her as a "gifted" woman who "with every advantage of mind and person, she was everything in this world to me, and when I lost her my happiness went to the grave with her".

== Irish Volunteer ==
In the wake of the American Revolution, Hope joined the Roughfort Corps of the Irish Volunteers. By his own account, his "connection with politics began in the ranks of the Volunteers": they were "the means of breaking the first link in the penal chain". He identified the source of the country's poverty and distress.

As a people, we were excluded from any share in framing the laws by which we were governed ... By force the poor were subdued and dispossessed of their interests in the soil; by fiction, the titles of the spoilers were established; and by fraud on the productive industry of future generations, the usurpation was continued.

In the Belfast Volunteer Review in 1792, marking the third anniversary of the fall of the Bastille, Hope paraded not with his Roughfort Corps but with 180 green-cockaded civilians from Carnmoney and Templepatrick (common people who may not have been able to afford the costs of equipping themselves for the Volunteer ranks). They carried aloft a banner designed by Hope and painted by his brother-in-law with the inscription; "Our Gallic brother was born on the 14th July 1789; alas we are still in embryo. Superstitious galaxy. The cause of the Irish Bastille; let us unite to destroy it."

It was in the Volunteers that Hope first met Henry Joy McCracken and Samuel Neilson. After the Volunteer movement split on the question of full and immediate Catholic emancipation and was suppressed by the government in 1793, he joined them in the Society of the United Irishmen, albeit with some reservation. He "lamented that we should shrink from an open declaration of our views into conspiracy".

== United Irishman ==
Hope concluded that in some quarters the movement for reform had been "merely between commercial and aristocratical interests, to determine which should have the people as its prey". In 1795, he took the United Irish pledge or “test” to "persevere in endeavouring to form a brotherhood of affection among Irishmen of every religious persuasion", and "to obtain an equal, full and adequate representation of all the people of Ireland". But by then, the Society was abandoning its hopes for parliamentary reform. Increasingly, thoughts turned toward insurrection and to prospects for assistance from the new French Republic.

Hope quickly established himself as a prominent organiser and was elected to the northern committee in Belfast. Together with Thomas Addis Emmet in Dublin, he accounted Neilson and McCracken and Thomas Russell in the north the only United Irish leaders who "perfectly" understood the real causes of social disorder and conflict: "the conditions of the labouring class". For Hope, Belfast was the centre in Ulster of a "factitious system" in which ultimately there was but:

...three parties: those whose industry produced the necessaries of life, those who circulated them, and those whose subsistence depended on fictitious claims and capital, and lived and acted as if men and cattle were created solely for their use and benefit...

In this Hope was perhaps closest to Russell. Commenting on growing trades union activity in Belfast and the surrounding districts in the pages of the movement's paper, the Northern Star, Russell urged "combinations" (labour unions) not only for tradesmen but also for labourers and cottiers.

In the spring of 1796, Neilson sent Hope to Dublin to help organise the workers in the capital. Himself working as a cotton weaver, Hope first recruited textile workers in Balbriggan. Then, targeting illegal workers’ combinations, he helped the spread of the organisation, with a considerable Protestant artisan membership, south of the river into the Liberties. When the rising came in May 1798, and it was clear that the city's garrison would prevent a United Irish demonstration in the capital, many of these workers quit the city to join the rebel standard in the countryside.

Hope also travelled, frequently in the company of William Putnam McCabe, to counties in Ulster and Connaught and into the Wicklow Mountains, disseminating literature and organizing localities. In one week alone, he travelled over 700 miles. In the midst of the Armagh Disturbances. working in parallel with Father James Coigly, he sought to reconcile the Peep o' Day Boys to their traditional enemies, the Catholic Defenders in the cause of what was simply called "The Union".

== 1798 rebellion ==
Hope noted that union membership of "rich farmers and shopkeepers" ebbed under the pressure of martial law but flowed again on a wider popular tide after the attempted French landing at Bantry in December 1796 made real the prospect of French assistance. From December to May 1797 membership in Ulster alone increased fourfold, reaching 117,917. When the call to arms finally came in the north in June 1798, however, he recognised that many of the wealthier union men had "staked more than was really in them".

Hope "remained steadfast" and led a "Spartan band" of weavers and labourers who covered the retreat of the rebels under the command of Henry Joy McCracken at the Battle of Antrim. Hope managed to rejoin McCracken and his remaining forces after the battle at their camp upon Slemish mountain.

The camp gradually dispersed, and the dwindling band of insurgents were then forced to go on the run. Hope successfully eluded capture, but McCracken was captured and executed on 17 July. Upon the collapse of the general rising, Hope refused to avail of the terms of an amnesty offered by Lord Cornwallis on the grounds that to do so would be "not only a recantation of one’s principles but a tacit acquiescence in the justice of the punishment which had been inflicted on thousands of my unfortunate associates".

== 1803 rising ==
In the aftermath of the rebellion young militants, chief among them Robert Emmet (the younger brother of Thomas Addis Emmet) and William Putnam McCabe (son of the Society's founder member, Thomas McCabe) sought to reorganise United Irishmen on a strict military-conspiratorial basis, with its members chosen personally by its officers, meeting as the executive directory. They were in contact with Thomas Russell and William Dowdall, detained as state prisoners in Fort George. The immediate aim of the reconstituted society was, in conjunction with simultaneous republican risings in Ireland and England to again solicit a French invasion. To this end, McCabe set out for London and Paris in December 1798.

Hope led a precarious existence, employed for a period by the leading Defender, Charles Hamilton Teeling, as overseer of his bleach green at Naul, north of the city, and then, until September 1803, with his wife running a small haberdasher's shop in the city. But when Russell returned from Fort George and brief exile, he was drawn into plans being co-ordinated with McCabe in Paris by Robert Emmet and Anne Devlin (ostensibly his housekeeper) and others on the new Dublin executive. They were organising a new republican insurrection to be triggered by the seizure of Dublin Castle.

In February 1803, hopes of being assisted by a rising of the heavily Irish-infiltrated United Britons network in London and in the mill towns of Lancashire and Yorkshire were blasted by the arrest and execution of Edward Despard and by the repression that followed. Meanwhile, despite McCabe's seeming favour with Napoleon, a renewed French attempt upon Ireland remained an uncertain prospect.

Hope made contact with Michael Dwyer (Devlin’s cousin), who still maintained rebel resistance in the Wicklow Mountains, and in April 1803 helped arrange two lengthy conferences with Emmett in Rathfarnham. Emmett promised, but proved unable, to provide Dwyer with arms. Hope headed north seeking to raise Antrim. But those districts of Antrim where he had previously found "the republican spirit, inherent in the principles of Presbyterian community, kept resistance to arbitrary power still alive" refused the call. Russell was similarly rebuffed when attempting to raise the standard in the Defender country of south Down.

Meanwhile in Dublin, events were driven by the accidental detonation of the rebel arms depot in Patrick Street which had made the military conspiracy public. After a brief street battle on the evening of 23 July, in which he had recoiled from the sight of a dragoon being pulled from his horse and piked to death, Emmett called the rising off.

== Later years ==
Hope evaded the authorities' attention in the ensuing repression by securing employment with a sympathetic friend from England in Belfast where he eventually benefitted from a political amnesty in 1806. He continued to work as a weaver, wrote poetry and his memoirs.

He also collaborated with Mary Ann McCracken, in assisting the historian R. R. Madden research his monumental The United Irishmen, their lives and times (1842-1860, 11 Vols.). Looking back on the United Irish struggle, he noted that on once "the people’s cause was finally lost, (at least in that struggle), ... [it] only remained for the enemy to attack the memory of the dead, and the characters of the living, and to slander all who had dared to resist their cruelty".

Hope had his doubts about Daniel O'Connell, not least his association with the laissez-faire liberalism of his English Whig allies -- Hope's own thinking increasingly paralleled the cooperative teaching of Robert Owen. But in the 1840s, well into his seventies, he chaired meetings of O'Connell's Repeal Association. This sought to reverse the 1800 Acts of Union and restore an independent Irish parliament.

== Death and commemoration ==
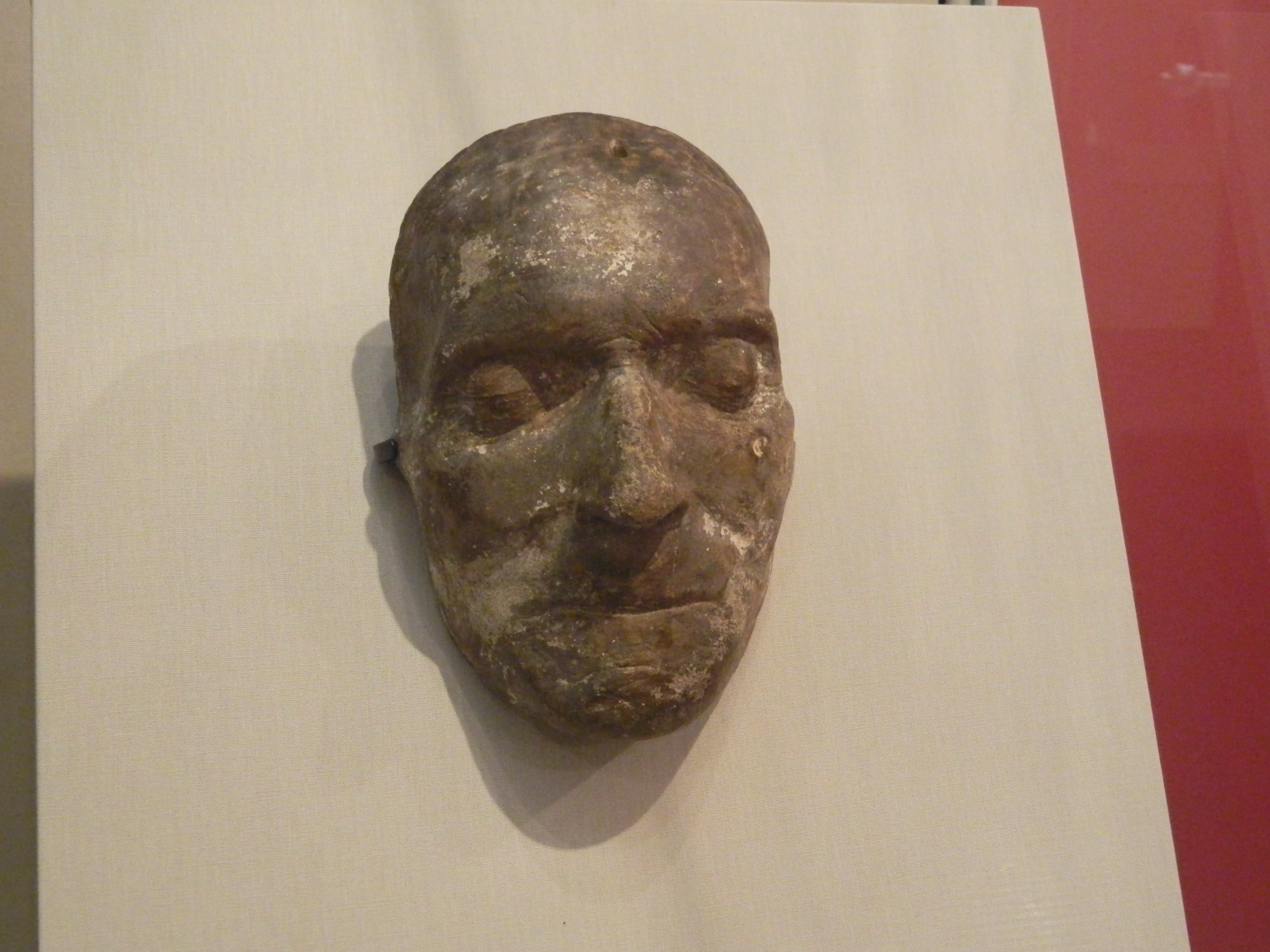
Death mask of Hope in the Ulster Museum

Hope died at No 1 Lancaster Street, Belfast, in 1847 aged 83 and was buried, in the Mallusk cemetery, Newtownabbey. The headstone was raised by his friends, Henry Joy McCracken’s sister Mary Ann, and the Shankill Road United Irishman Israel Milliken. The historian Richard Robert Madden, who had encouraged Hope to write his memoirs, supplied the inscription:

Sacred to the memory of James Hope ... One of nature's noblest works, an honest man. ... In the best era of his country's history a soldier in her cause, and in the worst of times, still faithful to it: ever true to himself and those that trusted in him. He remained to the last unchanged and unchangeable in his fidelity.

Underneath is the outline of a large dog, which is said to have brought Hope and his comrades provisions when they were hiding following the Battle of Antrim.

The biographer of his friend, Mary-Ann McCracken, Mary McNeill, says of Hope; "He represented the almost inarticulate aspirations of the strongly revolutionary element among the Presbyterian labourers both rural and urban: he was indeed the most radical of the United Irishmen". The historian A.T. Q. Stewart, considered Hope "a pioneer socialist before socialism had been articulated as a political creed'. The Ulster poet John Hewitt likewise classed Hope with William Thompson as one of "the brave old pre-Marx Marxists of Ireland".

The memory of Hope is celebrated by Left republicans, but where his social radicalism places him in relation to the subsequent development of Irish nationalism is disputed. Sean Cronin, former Chief-of-Staff in the anti-Treaty IRA, proposed that Hope had been to 1798 "what James Connolly was to 1916" -- the reprise of Emmet's rebellion in which the socialist leader tied labour's cause to Irish statehood. When an Ulster History Circle Blue Plaque marking Hope's birthplace (and installed with the support of the Ulster-Scots Agency) was smashed in 2014, the Unionist mayor of Newtownabbey, Fraser Agnew, argued that in identifying him with contemporary Irish Republicanism the vandals had shown their ignorance: "Jemmy Hope was a good Presbyterian man. He wanted the working class to unite for better conditions, he was a champion of ordinary people".

James Hope is portrayed by Des McAleer in Pat Murphy's 1984 film Anne Devlin.
