= Henry Howley =

Irish insurgent

Henry Howley (1775? - 1803), was a United Irish insurgent whose premature use of a weapon Robert Emmet thought was to blame for the failure of his plan in 1803 to seize Dublin Castle.

Howley was a Protestant born Roscrea, County Tipperary. He became a United Irishman, committed, in defiance of the British Crown and of the Ascendancy's Irish Parliament, to an independent and democratic Irish republic. His part in the rebellion of 1798 is unclear, but he appears to have assisted the rebel acquisition of arms.

In 1802 in Dublin, Howley became involved with Emmet's plans for a renewed insurrection. A skilled carpenter, Howley leased premises in Thomas Street where he supervised the manufacture and storage of arms. On the day of the rising, 23 July 1803, the house was raided, and behind false partitions, the authorities found an armoury of pikes, rockets, scaling ladders and grappling irons.

Howley, meanwhile, proceeded with plans to seize Dublin Castle, for which he was to bring up men and weapons hidden in six coaches. However, in Bridgefoot Street. he encountered a street brawl and in the course of the altercation he discharged a weapon killing Colonel Lyde Brown. Howley fled, leaving the coaches and his comrades to their fate. To this untoward accident Emmet chiefly ascribed the failure of his plot.

Howley's hiding place was subsequently betrayed by a fellow workman, Anthony Finnerty, to Major Sirr. In the scuffle to arrest him Howley shot one of the major's men, and escaped into a hayloft in Pool Street, but was soon captured. Having confessed to Brown's killing, he was condemned to death by a special commission and executed on 27 September 1803.
