= Henry Charles Sirr (town major) =

Anglo-Irish military officer and policeman (1764 – 1841)

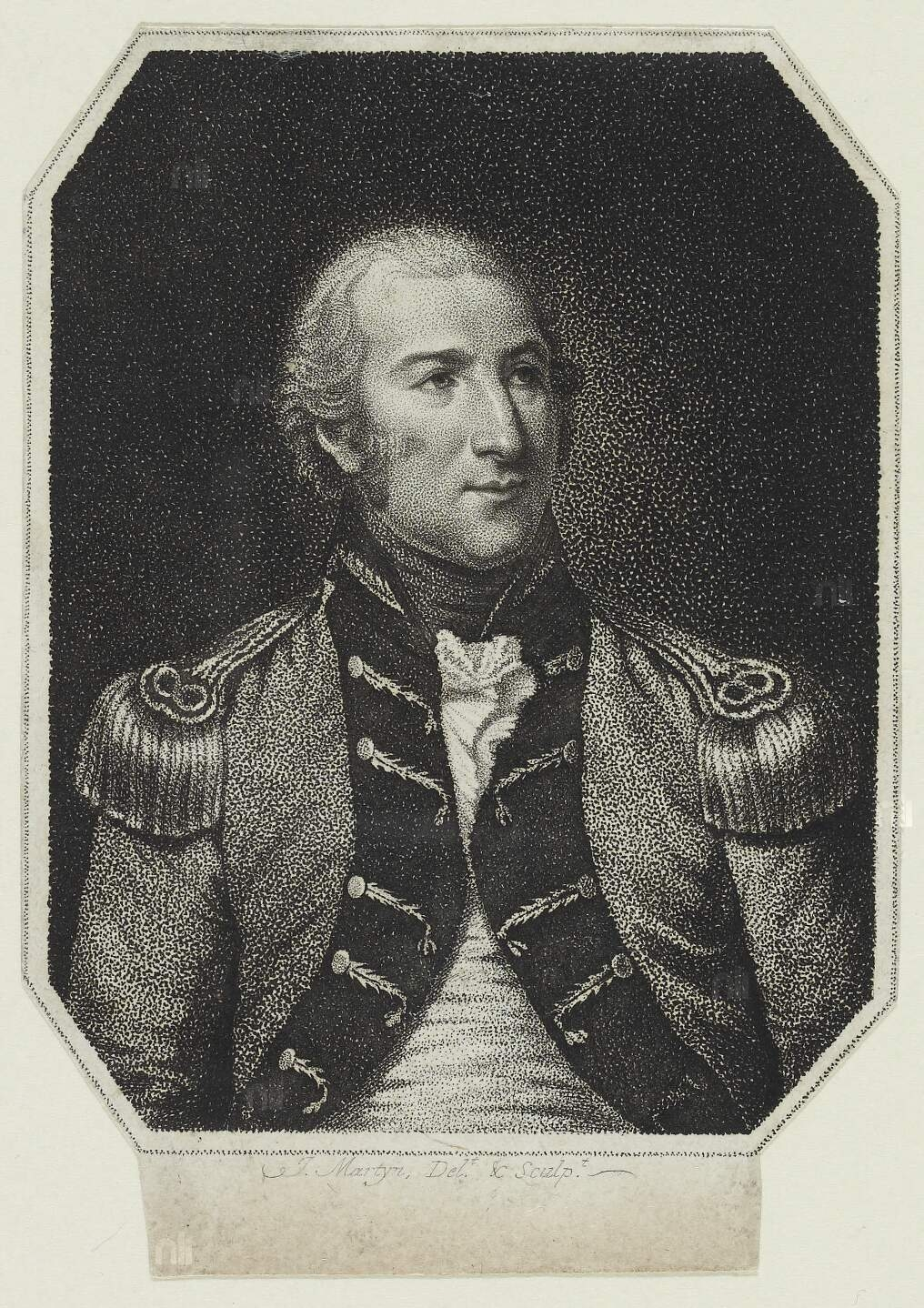
- Born: 25 November 1764; Dublin, Ireland
- Died: 7 January 1841 (aged 76); Dublin, Ireland
- Resting place: St. Werburgh's Church, Dublin
- Occupations: Military officer, policeman, merchant
- Known for: Killing of Lord Edward FitzGerald

Henry Charles Sirr (25 November 1764 – 7 January 1841) was an Anglo-Irish military officer, policeman, merchant and art collector. He played a prominent role in suppressing the Irish Rebellion of 1798, which included personally killing Society of United Irishmen leader Lord Edward FitzGerald, who Sirr alleged had been resisting arrest.

== Early life ==
Sirr was born in Dublin Castle, the son of Major Joseph Sirr, the Town Major (chief of police) of Dublin from 1762 to 1767. Sirr served in the British Army in 1778–1791, returning to Dublin with the rank of lieutenant, and thereafter in the wine trade.

In 1792 he married Eliza D'Arcy (1767–1829), the daughter of James D'Arcy. He was the father of Rev. Joseph D'Arcy Sirr, MRIA and of Henry Charles Sirr.

== Town Major of Dublin ==
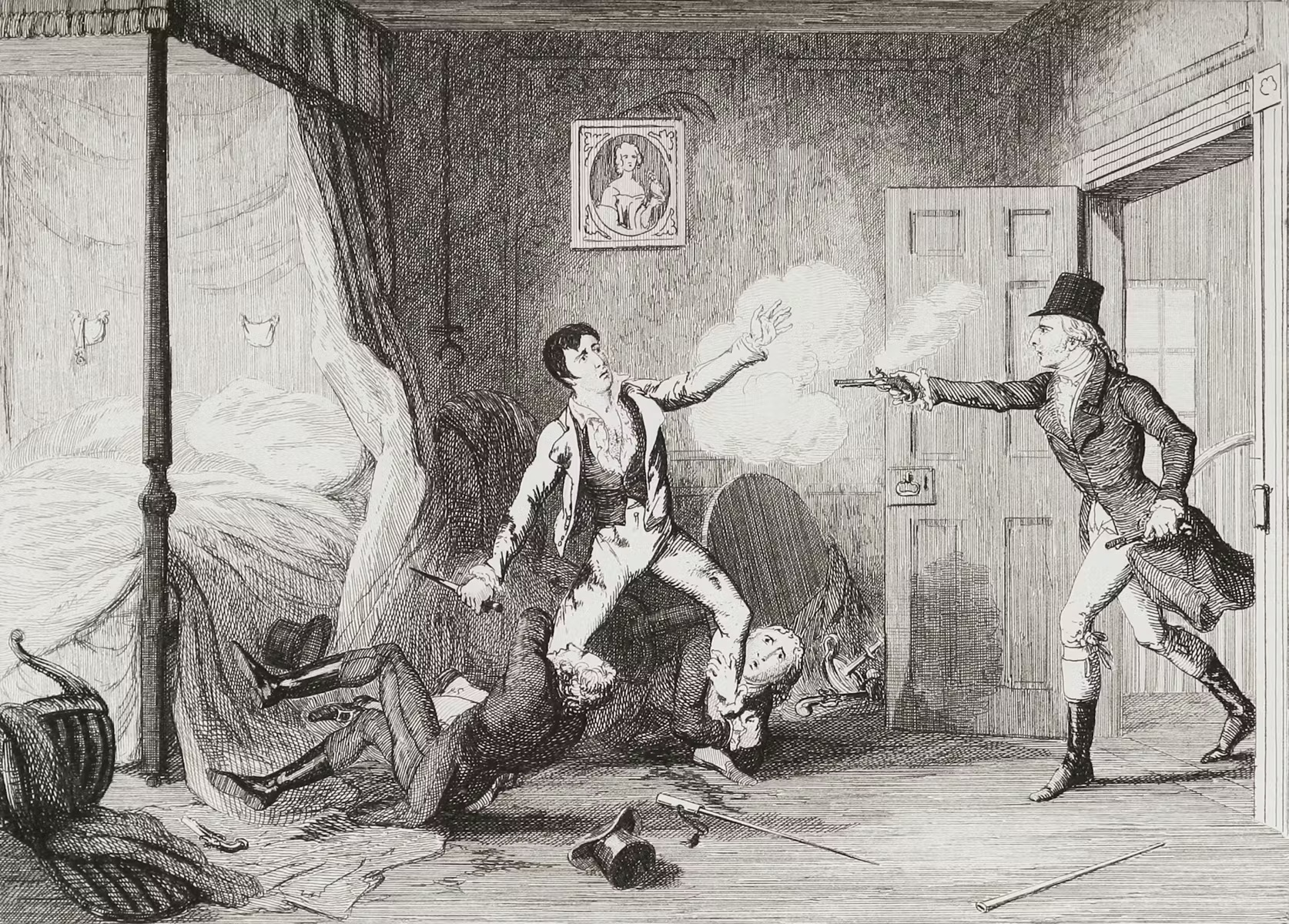
1845 engraving of Sirr shooting FitzGerald

In 1796, upon the formation of yeomanry in Dublin, he volunteered his services, and was appointed acting town-major or head of the police, and was thenceforward known as the chief agent of the Castle authorities. In 1798 he was promoted to the position of town-major, and received, in accordance with precedent, a residence in Dublin Castle.

Sirr was active in the efforts of the Castle to suppress the republican and insurrectionary United Irishmen. In the months prior to their rising in May and June 1798, he was prominent in the arrests of Peter Finnerty, the editor of their Dublin paper, the Press, on 31 October 1797, and of their leaders Thomas Russell and the popular Lord Edward Fitzgerald.

It was the capture of Fitzgerald on 19 May 1798 that brought him before the public. The day before, Sirr and a company of Dumbarton Fencibles surprised Fitzgerald as he was being led between safe houses by Mary Moore. Moore escaped with Fitzgerald (William Putnam McCabe and others of his bodyguard were arrested). Acting on a further tip off, Sirr raided a house the next evening. Alerted by the commotion, an ill and feverish FitzGerald jumped out of bed. He ignored the pleas of the arresting officers Captain William Bellingham Swan (later assistant town Major of Dublin) and Captain Daniel Frederick Ryan to surrender, stabbed Swan and mortally wounded Ryan with a dagger in a desperate attempt to escape. When he saw Major Sirr, Fitzgerald reportedly made at him, but the major fired and lodged several lugs in his shoulder. The wound that Sirr inflicted upon Fitzgerald is commonly supposed to have been fatal, although an inquest found on the evidence of the attending surgeon that his death on 4 June resulted from "water on the chest".

As a result of the arrest, pressure mounted within the United Irish organisation to rise before its leadership structure in Dublin was entirely disrupted and its arms stores elsewhere were confiscated. During this period Sirr's life was often in peril. The early historian of the rebellion, Robert Madden record three occasions in 1798 on which he barely escaped United Irish assassins.

In 1802, in a lawsuit, Hevey v. Sirr, presided over by Lord Kilwarden, Sirr was sued in a civil action which exposed the habitual abuses of power used by the Dublin police under his leadership. The renowned barrister John Philpot Curran told a long tale of a grudge held by Sirr against Mr Hevey; Hevey was a prosperous businessman and a Yeoman volunteer against the Rebellion, who had happened to be in court during a high treason case brought by Sirr. Hevey had recognised the witness for the prosecution, described him in court as "a man of infamous character", and convinced the jury that no credit was due to the witness. The treason case accordingly collapsed. Sirr and his colleague had then subjected Hevey to wrongful arrest, imprisonment incommunicado, extortion of goods and money, and condemnation to death by hanging. Curran implied that these techniques were typical of the methods used by Maj. Sirr and by others to suppress rebellion and for their own profits. Hevey sought in court for £5,000 damages for false imprisonment and extortion. The jury found a verdict against Sirr for £150 and sixpence costs (Howell, State Trials, xxviii. No. 647). The government paid Sirr's legal expenses.

On 25 August 1803 he was instrumental in the arrest of Robert Emmet, in the course of whose abortive rising the previous month in Dublin, Kilwarden had been murdered.

In 1808 Sirr was appointed a police magistrate for the city of Dublin. He continued to discharge his duties as town-major until 1826, when he retired upon full pay, and in consideration of his public services was allowed to retain his official residence in Dublin Castle.

== Later life ==
In 1808 the Dublin police was re-organised and his post was abolished, but he was allowed to retain the title. Niles' Register of 24 March 1821 remarks that "Several persons have been arrested at a public house in Dublin, by major Sirr, charged with being engaged in a treasonable meeting, and committed to prison... We thought that this old sinner, given to eternal infamy by the eloquence of Curran, had gone home".

In addition to such activities, Maj. Sirr devoted his profits and leisure to collecting art, curiosities, and antiquities. His collection of some five hundred paintings, was acquired after his death by the Royal Irish Academy. In 1818, he helped to found, for the purposes of anti-Catholic proselytism, the Irish Society for Promoting Scriptural Education in the Irish Language.

After the Whigs returned to office in 1830, Maj. Sirr reversed his lifelong position and supported Daniel O'Connell and the cause of reform:

When reform began to be talked of at the Castle by gentlemen in office, and it had ceased to be the custom to consider all reformers traitors, the major became a reformer, and was one of those who attended a public meeting in Dublin, on the occasion of the successful issue of the last French Revolution in 1830, and in approval of the principles then triumphant. When Catholic emancipation had made Mr. O’Connell eligible as a candidate for the representation of Dublin, and there was nothing to be got or gained by supporting the ascendency – or lost by disobliging the decrepid [sic] corporation – the major voted for Mr. O’Connell. Five-and-thirty years had intervened between the pillage of the Catholic leader’s house, and the lodging of its owner in Newgate – and the giving of his vote to send another to the imperial parliament.

Sirr died on 7 January 1841. He was buried in the graveyard of St. Werburgh's, Dublin, near Lord Edward Fitzgerald who is interred in the vaults of the same church.

Sirr intended to destroy all his correspondence; but a number of documents, many of them of considerable historical interest, were found after his death, and presented by his son to Trinity College Library, Dublin.

== Fictional representation ==
In many later Irish nationalist plays Sirr was portrayed as a generic melodramatic villain. James Joyce used him as the "type of the Irish turncoat" in Dubliners. In "Ivy Day in the Committee Room" a character remarks: "There's a lineal descendant of Major Sirr for you if you like! O, the heart's blood of a patriot! That's a fellow now that'd sell his country for fourpence—ay—and go down on his bended knees and thank the Almighty Christ he had a country to sell."

In Master and Commander by Patrick O'Brian, the character Stephen Maturin refers to the Rebellion as having spawned "a vile race of informers and things like Major Sirr".

== Arms ==
Coat of arms of Henry Charles Sirr
Notes Confirmed 4 December 1899 by Sir Arthur Edward Vicars, Ulster King of Arms. Crest An estoile as in the arms enclosed within two olive branches Proper above on an escroll the motto "Naulae Fida" Escutcheon Azure two chevronels interlaced Argent between three estoiles Or in chief a harp of Ireland above it the Imperial crown both Proper. Motto Lyrae Nervos Aptavi

== Bibliography ==
- Herr, Cheryl. For the Land They Loved: Irish Political Melodramas, 1890–1925. Syracuse University Press, 1991.
