= Peter Finnerty =

Irish printer and publisher (1766?–1822)

Peter Finnerty (1766?–11 May 1822) was an Irish printer, publisher, and journalist in both Dublin and London associated with radical, reform and democratic causes. In Dublin, he was a committed United Irishman, but was imprisoned in the course of the 1798 rebellion. In London he was a campaigning reporter for The Morning Chronicle, imprisoned again in 1811 for libel in his condemnation of Lord Castlereagh.

== United Irish pressman in Dublin ==
Finnerty was born in Loughrea, County Galway, the son of a town trader. Contemporary sources propose different dates for his birth, the earliest being 1766 and the latest 1778. In his recent biography of Finnerty, Andrew Shields suggests that he was most likely born in 1774 and that his father was a tailor. He moved to Dublin where he became a printer, later publishing (as titular proprietor) The Press, a United Irish paper established in September 1797 by Arthur O'Connor and William Sampson. Finnerty was closely associated with James MacHugo and Francis Dillon, fellow natives of Loughrea who built the local branch of the United Irishmen.

The Press's condemnation of the judges who sentenced William Orr to death for allegedly administering a United Irish test to a soldier and of the Lord Lieutenant of Ireland, Lord Camden, who refused to reprieve him, resulted in Finnerty being tried for seditious libel. His defence counsel, the renowned John Philpot Curran, appeared less concerned with addressing the charges against Finnerty, than in joining Finnerty in decrying the treatment of Orr. Finnerty was sentenced in the spring of 1798 to a session in the pillory and two years in prison, and was required to give security for his good behaviour for a further seven.

When Finnerty was taken to the pillory he was accompanied by the leading United Irishmen, Lord Edward Fitzgerald, Oiliver Bond, Henry Jackson, William Sampson, and Arthur O'Connor who held an umbrella over the prisoner's head. When he was released from the pillory he struck a defiant: '[Y]ou see how cheerfully I suffer. I can suffer anything provided it promotes the liberty of my country".

Finnerty's two years in prison, however, meant that he could play no role in the uprisings that occurred in the summer of 1798.

== Radical journalist in London ==
On his release in 1800, Finnerty emigrated to London. There was a report of Finnerty in 1803 travelling to Dublin to help Robert Emmet in his preparations for a renewed insurrection, and even an account of him commanding men on the streets during the aborted rising of July 23rd. But it is otherwise supposed that Finnerty remained in London where he busied with, not insurrectionary, but electoral politics.

In London, Finnerty found work as a parliamentary reporter with The Morning Chronicle. This brought him into the orbit of the reform candidate Sir Francis Burdett who had championed the cause of Edward Despard executed for treason in January 1803. Finnerty assisted Burdett in his attempts to gain a parliamentary seat in Middlesex in 1802 and 1804. He remained involved in electoral politics in London. Alongside William Cobbett, he supported Richard Brinsley Sheridan, the Irish playwright, satirist, and poet, who won the Westminster seat in 1807, and in 1811 the abolitionist and proponent of minimum wages, Samuel Whitbread MP for Bedford.

Finnerty associated with veterans of the artisan radical clubs. In the 1790s these had federated in the London Corresponding Society and been drawn into insurrectionary conspiracies by the United Irish emissaries James Coigly and William Putnam McCabe. His associates included the radical followers of Thomas Spence, (advocate of the common and democratic ownership of land), who were eager to recruit among London Irish communities that had provided the most dependable elements in Coigly's United Britons and in the Despard Plot.

Finnerty was not implicated alongside the Spenceans in either the Spa Field Riots of 1816 or the Cato Street Conspiracy of 1820. In 1817, he did come to their defence, exposing one of the jurors in the trial of the organisers of the Spa Field meeting as one of the government's principal informers against the United Irishmen, Thomas Reynolds.

In 1808 Finnerty contributed to An Appeal to the Public, and a Farewell Address to the Public, which exposed the sale of military commissions by the mistress of the Duke of York, the King's brother. In 1809 he reported on the disasters of the Walcheren Campaign, which accompanied as the Chroncile's special correspondent, laying blame at the feet of Lord Castlereagh. When in 1811, Finnerty further accused Castlereagh of sanctioning torture and extra-judicial executions in the suppression of the I798 Rebellion in Ireland, the establishment struck back. Finnerty was convicted of libel and imprisoned for eighteen months.

Radicals and reformers raised subscriptions for Finnerty in London, Liverpool, Belfast and Dublin. In An Address to the Irish People, which he to personally distribute around Dublin on a visit to the city early in 1812, Percy Bysshe Shelley hailed Finnerty as a man "imprisoned for persisting in the truth." Finnerty kept the controversy alive by complaining about the conditions of his confinement to Parliament in a petition that repeated the libel against Castlereagh.

Finnerty returned to the Morning Chronicle but, as he was increasingly given to drink, in the last years before his death in 1822 he faded from public notice.
