= Florence Mary Wilson (writer) =

Poet

- Born: Florence Mary Addy c. 1870; County Antrim, Ireland
- Died: 1946; County Down, Ireland
- Occupation: Writer

Florence Mary Wilson (c. 1870 – 1946) was an Irish poet, best known as the author ballad The Man from God Knows Where which celebrates the life of the United Irishman, Thomas Russell.

== Life ==
Born in Lisburn, County Antrim to Margaret Addy (née Laughlin) and Robert Addy, a Methodist preacher and mill manager, she married solicitor Fred Wilson in 1898 and lived in Bangor, County Down with whom she had six children. Wilson was a regular contributor to the Irish Homestead, Northern Whig, and other papers. She was a friend of Alice Milligan and Alice Stopford Green, like herself Protestant Irish nationalists. Wilson is best known in Ireland for the ballad she wrote on the eve of the War of Independence in 1918, The Man from God Knows Where. It celebrates the United Irish organiser, Thomas Russell, who was executed in 1803. She wrote a volume of poetry The Coming of the Earls which was republished frequently and was popular in America.
