= William Orr (United Irishman) =

Irish revolutionary

- Born: 1766; Farranshane, County Antrim, Ireland
- Died: October 14, 1797 (aged 30–31) Carrickfergus, Country Antrim, Ireland
- Allegiance: Society of United Irishmen

William Orr (1766 – 14 October 1797) was an Irish revolutionary and member of the United Irishmen who was executed in 1797 in what was widely believed at the time to be "judicial murder" and whose memory led to the rallying cry “Remember Orr” during the 1798 rebellion.

== Background ==
Little is known of his early life. Orr was born to a Presbyterian farming family and bleach-green proprietor, of Ferranshane (Farranshane) outside Antrim town. The family were in comfortable circumstances, and William Orr as a result received a good education. His appearance and manner were at the time considered noteworthy, he stood six feet two inches (1.88 m) in height, and was always carefully and respectably dressed, a familiar feature in his apparel being a green necktie, which he wore "even in his last confinement". His popularity amongst his countrymen is also noted, particularly among the Northern Presbyterian patriots. He was to become active in the Irish Volunteers and then joined the United Irishmen.

Sometime in the mid-1790s, he contributed several articles to their newspaper, the Northern Star.

== Arrest and trial ==
He was charged at Carrickfergus Courthouse with administering the United Irish Test to a soldier named Hugh Wheatly, an offence which had recently been deemed a capital charge under the 1796 Insurrection Act. The offence was aggravated (from a legal point of view) because of the allegation that it was a serving soldier to whom Orr was alleged to have administered the oath. The prosecution made the most of this "proof" of the "treasonable" aim of the United Irishmen to "seduce from their allegiance" the "men who are the Kingdom's only safeguard against the foreign foe".

The United Irishmen knew from the evidence of some of their own number that Orr had not administered the oath on the occasion alleged. They also had the evidence of another eye-witness, Jamie Hope. The soldier witness Wheatly perjured himself and it was proved he was of bad character. The person who did tender the oath was a well-known member of the Society, William McKeever, who subsequently escaped to America.

It was widely believed at the time that the authorities wished to make an example of Orr to act as a deterrent to potential recruits for the Society of United Irishmen. The actual case, which did not appear in the course of the proceedings but everyone, according to T. A. Jackson, was "in the know" and fully aware was that The United Irishmen's oath had been administered to a soldier; "whether it was Orr or another who administered the oath was merely incidental".

== Defence ==
William Orr was represented by John Philpot Curran, and the trial led to a speech, which, according to T. A. Jackson, "is among the most remarkable of his many remarkable speeches."

It was a charge of libel against the Press newspaper, the journal founded by Arthur O'Connor to replace the Northern Star. The Press had published an open letter to the Viceroy, remarking scornfully on his refusal to show clemency to Orr. Curran's defence was a counter-attack—an indictment of the Government, root and branch:

You [jury] are called upon to say, on your oaths, that the Government is wise and merciful—the people prosperous and happy; that military law ought to be continued; that the constitution could not with safety be restored to Ireland; and that the statements of a contrary import by your advocates, in either country, are libellous and false.

I tell you that these are the questions. And I ask you if you can have the front to give the expected answer in face of a community which knows the country as well as you do.

Let me ask you how you could reconcile with such a verdict the gaols, the gibbets, the tenders, the conflagrations, the murders, the proclamations we hear of every day in the streets and see every day in the country? What are the prosecutions of the learned counsel himself [Attorney General] circuit after circuit? Merciful God! What is the state of Ireland, and where shall you find the wretched inhabitant of this land?

You may find him perhaps in a gaol; the only place of security—I had almost said, of ordinary habitation! If you do not find him there you may find him flying with his family from the flames of his own dwelling—lighted to his dungeon by the conflagration of his own hovel! Or you may find his bones bleaching on the green fields of his country! Or you may find him tossing on the surface of the ocean, mingling his groans with the tempests, less savage than his persecutors, that drive him to a returnless distance from his family and his home—without charge, or trial, or sentence!

Is this a foul misrepresentation? Or can you, with these facts ringing in your ears and staring in your faces, say upon your oaths they do not exist? You are called upon in defiance of shame, of honour, of truth, to deny the sufferings under which you groan, and to flatter the persecution which tramples you under foot.

== Sentence ==
The only evidence used against Orr was the unsupported evidence of the soldier Wheatly and after hearing Curran's defence of the prisoner, "there could be no possible doubt of his innocence". Even the presiding judge, Yelverton, was said to have shed tears at the passing of the death sentence, although Orr's friend, the poet and United Irishman William Drennan expressed his disgust at this display with the words “I hate those Yelvertonian tears”.

== Speech from the Dock ==
My friends and fellow-countrymen, — In the thirty-first year of my life I have been sentenced to die upon the gallows, and this sentence has been in pursuance of a verdict by twelve men who should have been indifferently and impartially chosen. How far they have been so, I leave to that country from which they have been chosen to determine; and how far they have discharged their duty, I leave to their God and to themselves. They have, in pronouncing their verdict, thought proper to recommend me as an object of humane mercy. In return, I pray to God, if they have erred, to have mercy upon them. The judge who condemned me humanely shed tears in uttering my sentence. But whether he did wisely in so highly commending the wretched informer who swore away my life, I leave to his own cool reflection, solemnly assuring him and all the world, with my dying breath, that that informer was foresworn.

The law under which I suffer is surely a severe one— may the makers and promoters of it be justified in the integrity of their motives, and the purity of their own lives! By that law I am stamped a felon, but my heart disdains the imputation.

My comfortable lot, and industrious course of life, best refute the charge of being an adventurer for plunder; but if to have loved my country—to have known its wrongs —to have felt the injuries of the persecuted and to have united with them and all other religious persuasions in the most orderly and least sanguinary means of procuring redress – if those be felonies, I am a felon, but not otherwise. Had my counsel (for whose honourable exertions I am indebted) prevailed in their motions to have me tried for high treason, rather than under the Insurrection Law, I should have been entitled to a full defence, and my actions would have been better vindicated; but that was refused, and I must now submit to what has passed.

To the generous protection of my country I leave a beloved wife, who has been constant and true to me, and whose grief for my fate has already nearly occasioned her death. I have five living children, who have been my delight. May they love their country as I have done, and die for it if needful.

Lastly, a false and ungenerous publication having appeared in a newspaper, stating certain alleged confessions of guilt on my part, and thus striking at my reputation, which is dearer to me than life, I take this solemn method of contradicting the calumny. I was applied to by the High-Sheriff to make a confession of guilt, and by the Rev. William Bristow, sovereign of Belfast, who used entreaties to that effect: this I peremptorily refused. If I thought myself guilty, I would freely confess it; but, on the contrary, I glory in my innocence.

I trust that all my virtuous countrymen will bear me in their kind remembrance, and continue true and faithful to each other, as I have been to all of them. With this last wish of my heart nothing doubting of the success of that cause for which I suffer, and hoping for God's merciful forgiveness of such offences as my frail nature may have at any time betrayed me into, I die in peace and charity with all mankind.

== Legacy ==
The sentence was hardly passed on William Orr when regret was to seize on those who had aided in securing that verdict. The witness Wheatly, who subsequently went insane, is believed to have died by his own hand, made an affidavit before a magistrate admitting that he had sworn wrongly against Orr. Two of the jury made depositions stating that they had been "induced to join in the verdict of guilty while under the influence of drink"; while two others swore that they had "been terrified into the same course by threats of violence".

These particulars were placed before the Viceroy, but Lord Camden, the Lord Lieutenant of Ireland, was "deaf to all appeals" (including from his sister Lady Londonderry). "Well might Orr exclaim within his dungeon" he said "that the Government had laid down a system having for its object murder and devastation".

Orr was hanged, in the town of Carrickfergus though his execution was postponed three times on 14 October 1797, surrounded by an extra strong military guard. It is said that the population of the town, to express their sympathy with the "patriot" being "murdered by law", and to mark their repugnance of the conduct of the Government towards him, quit the town on the day of his execution.

His fate "excited the deepest indignation throughout the country”; and it was commented on "in words of fire" by the national writers of the period, and for many years after the rallying cry of the United Irishmen was: "Remember Orr". The journalist Peter Finnerty, who published an attack on Yelverton and Camden for their conduct in the matter, was later convicted of seditious libel, despite an eloquent defence by Curran.

Orr is regarded as the first United Irish martyr. Before his execution in July 1798, Henry Joy McCracken passed through his cell window a ring taken from his hand to his sister Mary Ann McCracken inscribed on the inside with the words, ‘Remember Orr’ on the inside. It had been the cry of the rebels he had commanded at the Battle of Antrim.

William Drennan the United Irishmen poet wrote, on Orr's death:
hapless land!
Heap of uncementing sand!
Crumbled by a foreign weight:
And, by worse, domestic hate.

William Orr's place in Ulster folk history has been researched by the historian Guy Beiner, who considers it to be an example of "a complex mode of social memory that could be labelled 'social forgetting'".
