= Test of the Society of United Irishmen =

The Test of the Society of United Irishmen was a pledge taken by members of the Society of United Irishmen, a republican political society in the Kingdom of Ireland, that was the main organising force in the rebellion of 1798. As the Society, despairing of reform, began to arm and drill, it amended the original wording to accommodate greater militancy and the need for secrecy. Under the Insurrection Act 1796 (36 Geo. 3. c. 20 (I)), the administration of the test became a capital offence. There were local variants, and overseas societies of United Irish exiles, convicts, and sympathisers framed their own tests.

== Original wording, 1791 ==
The original Test taken by members of the Society of United Irishmen was written by the Belfast physician William Drennan. Approved at the first meeting of the Dublin society in November 1791, it read:

I, - AB in the presence of God, do pledge myself to my country, that I will use all my abilities and influence in the attainment of an impartial and adequate representation of the Irish nation in parliament: and as a means of absolute and immediate necessity in accomplishing this chief good of Ireland, I shall do whatever lies in my power to forward a brotherhood of affection, an identity of interests, a communion of rights, and a union of power among Irishmen of every religious persuasion, without which every reform must be partial, not national, inadequate to the wants, delusive to the wishes, and insufficient for the freedom and happiness of this country.

At the meeting, Theobald Wolfe Tone and Thomas Russell objected that the wording was too vague, and that the pledge might dissuade potential members. Although Tone and Russell were prime movers in the formation of the society, and were later joined in their opinion of the test by Whitely Stokes, their reservations were overruled by the broader membership.

Less elaborate, local variants of the test were administered. As recollected in his own words, in Templepatrick, County Antrim, James Burns took the following oath:

I, James Burns, do voluntarily declare that I will persevere and endeavour to form a Brotherhood of affection amongst Irishmen of every religious persuasion. I do further declare that I will persevere and endeavour for a Parliamentary Reform, and for an equal representation of all the people in Ireland.

== Militant revision, 1795 ==
As government repression increased following the French declaration of war on Britain in February 1793, and as a move, beginning in Belfast, was made toward a more militant, potentially insurrectionary, organisation, the test was revised. Delegates from seventy-two societies meeting in Belfast on 10 May 1795 approved amendments to Drennan's original test inserting the words "full representation of the people" and omitting reference to the Irish parliament. Emphasis was also placed on the need for secrecy. The test, or oath as it was now commonly referred to, now read:

In the awful presence of God, I, [name], do voluntarily declare, that I will persevere in endeavouring to form a brotherhood of affection among Irishmen of every religious persuasion, and that I will also persevere in my endeavours to obtain an equal, full and adequate representation of all the people of Ireland. I do further declare, that neither hopes, fears, rewards or punishments shall ever induce me, directly or indirectly, to inform on or give evidence against any member or members of this or similar societies, for any act or expression of theirs, done or made, collectively or individually, in or out of this society, in pursuance of the spirit of this obligation.

In the words of William James MacNeven (McNevin) who had taken the oath in Dublin from Mary Moore, "the substance was so altered as to correspond with the progress of opinion, embracing both republicans and reformers".

Under the Insurrection Act 1796 (36 Geo. 3. c. 20 (I)) any person convicted of administering the test was to "suffer death without benefit of clergy" and anyone taking the oath was to be "transported for life". An early and celebrated victim of the Act was William Orr who, in October 1797 was hanged in Carrickfergus, County Antrim, for administering the United Irish test to two soldiers.

== Pledge of the American Society of United Irishmen, 1797 ==
In August 1797, MacNeven, James Reynolds, Archibald Hamilton Rowan and other movement exiles in the United States published the constitution of the American Society of United Irishmen, an association that had been active for some months. Adopted at a convention in Philadelphia, it opened membership to "all those who had suffered in the cause of freedom" (according the hostile reporting of the Federalist pamphleteer William Cobbett, this included free blacks), and who would make the following pledge:

AB, in the presence of the most SUPREME BEING, do solemnly swear that I will, to the utmost of my power, promote the emancipation of Ireland from the tyranny of the British Government. That I will use the like endeavours for increasing and perpetuating the warmest affections between all the religious denominations of men, and for the attainment of the LIBERTY AND EQUALITY OF MANKIND, IN WHATEVER NATION I MAY RESIDE. Moreover I swear, that I will, as far as in me lies, promote the interests of this and every other society of United Irishmen, and of each of its members, and that I will never, from fear of punishment, or hope of reward, divulge any of its SECRETS given to me as such.

== United Irish oath-taking in the colonies ==
In 1800, Catholic mutineers in Newfoundland reportedly took "the oaths of the United Irishmen". United Irish convicts in New South Wales may have done the same in preparing for their rebellion in 1804, but the wording is not recorded.
