= Thomas Russell (rebel) =

Leader of the United Irishmen

Thomas Paliser Russell
- Born: November 21, 1767; Dromahane, County Cork, Kingdom of Ireland
- Died: October 21, 1803 (aged 35); Downpatrick, County Down, United Kingdom of Great Britain and Ireland
- Cause of death: Executed for High Treason
- Occupations: Soldier, Librarian, Revolutionary
- Notable work: Letter to the People of Ireland (1796)
- Movement: Society of United Irishmen

Thomas Paliser Russell (21 November 1767 – 21 October 1803) was a founding member, and leading organiser, of the United Irishmen marked by his radical-democratic and millenarian convictions. A member of the movement's northern executive in Belfast, and a key figure in promoting a republican alliance with the agrarian Catholic Defenders, he was arrested in advance of the risings of 1798 and held until 1802. He was executed in 1803, following Robert Emmet's aborted rising in Dublin for which he had tried, but failed, to raise support among United and Defender veterans in the north.

== Background ==
Russell was born in Dromahane, County Cork to an Ascendancy family that, early 1770s, moved to Dublin when his father, a veteran of the American Revolutionary War, was appointed Captain of Invalids at the Royal Hospital, Kilmainham. At the age of fifteen, he sailed with the 100th Regiment of Foot (Loyal Lincolnshire Regiment), his brother's regiment, to India. In July 1783 he was commissioned an ensign into the 100th Foot and saw action in the Second Anglo-Mysore War. At Cannanore he distinguished himself by carrying his wounded commanding officer from the battlefield. His services made him "favourably known" to Sir John Burgoyne and Lord Cornwallis. He was, however, disgusted by what he regarded as "the unjust and rapacious conduct pursued by the authorities in the case of two native women", and returned disaffected to Ireland in 1786. After briefly studying for the church ministry, he spent the next four years as a half-pay officer in Dublin pursuing studies of science, philosophy and politics.

In July 1790 in the visitors' gallery in the Irish House of Commons, he met Theobald Wolfe Tone. He found Tone even more critical of the proceedings in the chamber below where the patriot leader Henry Grattan was unable to capitalise on his triumph in securing Ireland's legislative independence from England (the "Revolution of 1782"") to effect meaningful reform. Writing his Autobiography six years later in Paris, Tone was to describe the encounter with Russell as "one of the most fortunate in my life".

== Russell in Belfast ==
At the end of August 1790, Russell was commissioned into the 64th (2nd Staffordshire) Regiment of Foot, which was then stationed in Belfast. As an officer of the garrison, Russell was received into the society of the town's newly emerging professional and business class. Largely Presbyterian, they were resentful of the privileges and monopolies of the Anglican Ascendancy and sympathetic to what they perceived as the democratic ideals of the American, and now French, revolutions.

With his keen mind and his own radical bent, Russell became a confidante of William Drennan, Samuel McTier, Samuel Neilson and later of Henry Joy McCracken, James Hope, and others who were to play a prominent role in the United Irish movement.

It is said that Russell admired and respected men and women alike. Both Drennan's sister Martha McTier and McCracken's sister Mary Ann McCracken took him into their confidence. Mary Ann, who regarded Russell as "a model of manly beauty" with a grace "which nothing but superiority of intellect can give", shared with him her enthusiasm for the female-emancipatory ideas of Mary Wollstonecraft. McTier had Russell address meetings of other radically-minded women and declared: "I admire that man much and had I the power I do believe that he would be the first man that I would serve".

Russell appeared more than willing to join McTier and McCracken in their enthusiasm for Mary Wollstonecraft's Vindication of their rights as women (1792): "women in public offices", he noted in his Journal, were "as clever as men. Queens, poetesses etc. etc, In merchants houses they keep accounts as well as men". His advanced thoughts on their rights, however, did not preclude a conflicted relationship with women. His Journal was also to record the torment both of a love for the idealised and unapproachable Eliza Goddard (daughter of a close friend of McTier's) and of guilt-ridden visits to Belfast prostitutes.

In October 1791, and in the presence of Tone, invited to Belfast as the proponent of political union with disenfranchised Catholics, Russell attended the inaugural meeting of the Society of United Irishmen. While Tone recapitulated his Argument on behalf of the Catholics of Ireland, Russell presented a history of the Catholic Committee in Dublin and of his own negotiations with leading Catholics. The resolutions, which Tone had asked Russell to write, called for the elimination of all remaining sacramental tests and for an "equal representation of all the people" in the Dublin Parliament.

After several months, and to avoid debt, Russell accepted the offer of Viscount Northland of Tyrone, the father of an old army friend, to become seneschal (a kind of stipendiary magistrate) to the Northlands' manor court at Dungannon. But Russell was appalled by the anti-Catholicism of his fellow magistrates and possibly also of the Northland family, and he resigned in October 1792. His experience in Dungannon contributed significantly to his developing radicalism, and he never again served in any official position or sought the patronage of his aristocratic friends.

With Drennan's assistance, in 1793 Russell was to take a position more congenial to his friends: librarian at the Belfast Society for Promoting Knowledge (the later Linen Hall Library). The year before, under the active patronage of Dr James MacDonnell, the Society had organised the Belfast Harpers Assembly. As secretary, Russell ensured that transcriptions by his friend Edward Bunting of the melodies played were published. In 1794, Russell attended Irish-language classes offered by Pádraig Ó Loingsigh (Patrick Lynch) at the Belfast Academy.

== United Irish revolutionary ==
Caricature of Thomas Russell circa 1795

Britain's entry into the war against revolutionary France at the beginning of 1793 and the increased domestic repression that followed, caused the United Irishmen increasingly to despair of reform. At the same time, the possibility of French intervention and assistance encouraged the thought of insurrection. By mid-1793 Russell had shed his sympathies for the parliamentary patriots or Irish Whigs. In a letter to Belfast's United Irish paper the Northern Star he denounced Henry Grattan's parliamentary opposition as "insignificant" and accused him of "declaiming, and grinning, and chattering at the abuses of that ministry, which but for him would not now exist". In Review of the Lion of Old England; or Democracy Confounded (1794) (dedicated to the reputedly enlightened "Empress of all the Russias", Catherine II), Russell and his friend William Sampson (John Philpot Curran's Junior Counsel) suggested that, in Ireland, the English charters Grattan celebrated in his strict constitutionalism—Magna Carta, the Bill of Rights and Habeas Corpus—did little more than "amuse the masses".

In June 1795, as a member of the Society's increasingly conspiratorial Northern Executive, Russell met with McCracken. Neilson, Robert Simms and, en route to exile in the United States, with Tone. At McArt's fort atop Cave Hill overlooking Belfast they swore the celebrated oath "never to desist in our efforts until we had subverted the authority of England over our country, and asserted our independence'".

Russell travelled widely throughout Ulster, recruiting and organising for the United Irishmen. In September 1795 an informer reported that "Capt. Russell of Belfast has been appointed to the command of all the societies in the province of Ulster"; while sometime later, one of the government's most reliable agents informed the Castle that the United Irishmen were ready to rise and that "Russell…now conducts all their plans". His role as a United Irish recruiter was commemorated in the well-known ballad "The man from God-knows-where" written by Florence Mary Wilson.

In October 1793 he founded the Society in Enniskillen with William Henry Hamilton. In January 1794, Hamilton married Russell's niece, Mary Ann Russell (c.1775–c.1840), who herself had radical political views, and he was to remain a close confidante and collaborator.

== Social radical ==
In 1796, Russell published a Letter to the People of Ireland on the Present State of the Country—the fullest exposition of his democratic and increasingly millenarian outlook. He castigated the aristocracy for stalling progress towards reform in the 1780s, for their moral corruption, and their unworthiness to govern. He insisted that all men have not only the right but the duty, to concern themselves with government and politics. Only if legislation seeks to serve "the whole family of mankind", rather than just self-interested minorities, can there be some hope that it will reflect the natural justice ordained by God.

Russell looked to a simpler, purer form of government in which the will of a benevolent deity could operate untrammelled by greed and corruption and man could realise those rights accorded him by nature. These, he believed, required radical changes to the distribution and prerogatives of property. "The way lands are held makes the people slaves" and he could not see "why a law should not be made as to the length of leases, as well as for any other purpose".

He decried the cruelties of millwork and the poverty induced by the exactions and indifference of the aristocracy and the government. As an acting magistrate in Dungannon Russell had taken the side of local linen weavers in their disputes with their employers. While some radicals took a hostile view of tradesmen's combinations, seeing them as an obstacle to the self-regulating harmony of the market, Russell looked upon them with approval. Clashing with Samuel Nielson in the Northern Star, he recommended combination—unions—not for only tradesmen but also for labourers and cottiers.

In advance of Tone's oft-quoted declaration in 1796, Russell was "among the first of the United Irishmen to conclude that they would have to depend on 'the men of no property'". In July 1793, he argued:

... from what I can see, the men of property, whether landed or commercial, are decidedly against a struggle, which might risqué that and will do nothing. The people are begin[n]ing to see this and in time when they will feel their strength and injurys [sic] they will do it themselves and adieu to property!

While Tone feared that the "san culottes ... are too ignorant for any thinking man to see in power", Russell was perhaps closer to Martha McTier. In 1795 she wrote approvingly to her brother of Belfast's plebeian Jacobin Club (United Irishmen among them), describing it as composed of "persons and rank long kept down [who] now come forward with a degree of information that might shame their betters".

Less controversially for Belfast, Russell had made clear his uncompromising opposition to slavery. The veteran anti-slavery campaigner, Henry Joy McCracken's sister Mary Ann, remembered that as a young officer in Belfast, Russell had "abstained from the use of slave labour produce until slavery in the West Indies was abolished, and at the dinner parties to which he was so often invited and when confectionery was so much used he would not take anything with sugar in it".

But Russell, with his experience in India, had a broader critique of the iniquities of the colonial trade in which Belfast was engaged. He cautioned:

If the English, or any other people, think gold a sufficient cause to shed blood—if they are satisfied to fill the world with carnage and misery, that they may acquire cloves and nutmegs, and contracts, and slaves—let it not be so with us.

== State prisoner ==
With his close friend Henry Joy McCracken, Russell was a key figure in forming the alliance between the northern United Irishmen and the greatest body, existing, of "men of no property", the Defenders. A vigilante response to Peep O'Day raids upon Catholic homes in the mid-1780s, by the early 1790s the Defenders (drawing, like the United Irishmen, on the lodge structure of the Masons) were a secret oath-bound fraternity ranging across Ulster and the Irish midlands.

Such activities increasingly alarmed the authorities and on 16 September 1796, they finally struck. A large military force descended on Belfast, sealed off the town, and arrested several leading United men, including Russell. Russell was held, without charge, in Newgate Prison where, in the spring and summer of 1798, he was forced to sit out the ill-fated insurrection. He was considerably more reluctant than most of his colleagues to come to terms with the government, attempting from prison to instigate further armed resistance. In March 1799 he was detained for a further three years, with other state prisoners, at Fort George in Scotland.

His letters reveal that as he brooded on the state of the world he increasingly found sense and solace in biblical prophecy. The combined effect of the continuation of the war in Europe, its spread to the Middle East, and the bloody summer of 1798 in Ireland, seems to have only intensified his belief that the world was then engaged in a time of troubles which St John had foretold would precede the coming of Christ's kingdom. His duty was to prepare the way by raising his hand against the war-mongering British monarchy.

Consistent with this bible faith, Russell's friend, the botanist John Templeton, with whom he continued to correspond from Fort George, could not deflect him from the story of creation as told in Genesis. To Templeton's report of bivalve shells being discovered in a salt mine, Russell responded: "I am of no theory except the account contained in the Scriptures, which I conceive to be consistent with the wisdom and power of the Creator, and agreeable to the present appearance of the world ...".

While confined to Fort George, Russell, Samuel Neilson, and the lawyer William Dowdall remained in contact with Robert Emmet, William Putnam McCabe and other young militants. They were determined to reconstruct the Society on a strict military basis, with its members chosen personally by its officers' meeting as the executive directory. The immediate aim of the directory was, in conjunction with simultaneous risings in Ireland and England to again solicit a French invasion.

At the end of June 1802, during what he anticipated would prove a "hollow truce" in the war with France, Russell was released on condition of exile to Hamburg. Writing on the eve of his departure from St George, and in the fifth year of his imprisonment, Russell expressed confidence that the struggle for liberty in Ireland was about to resume "with fresh vigour":

Ireland stands on better ground than ever, by our union, the people were taught to love each other, to know their strength and valour in the field--by their defeat they have been taught to know their enemies, and are ready to resume the contest, and that successfully, where there comes a favourable opportunity of doing so.

== 1803 Rising ==
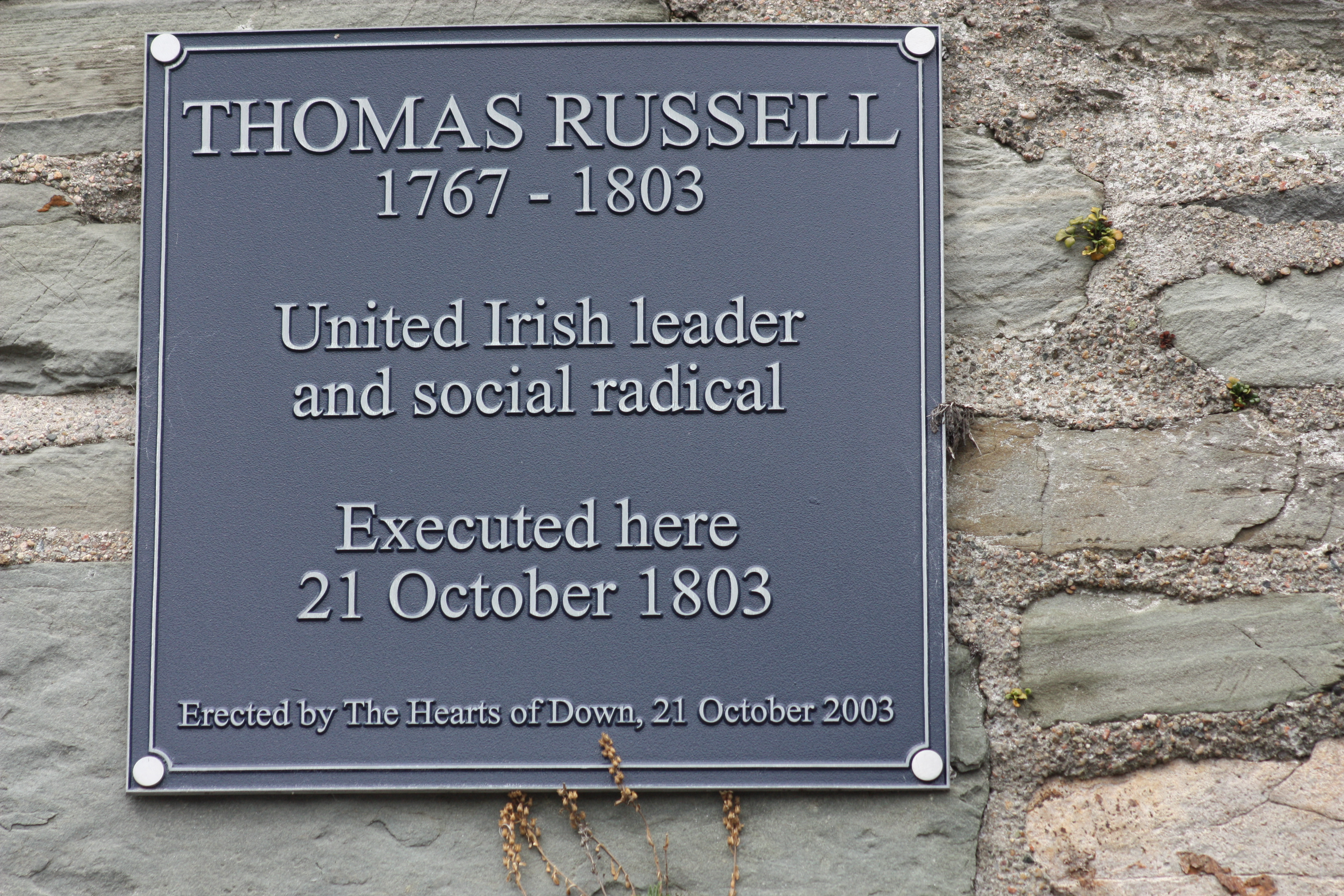
Memorial plaque, Down County Museum, Downpatrick, County Down, August 2009

Not content to sit things out in Hamburg, Russell soon made his way to Paris where he met Robert Emmet who, with the roving McCabe (Paris, Hamburg, London, Scotland, Ireland) were advancing the plans for insurrection pending the French renewal of the war against England. Russell, like Emmet, had little confidence in the French. He did "not accept the Napoleonic usurpation as a continuation of the Republic", and declined to take a French commission. With hopes of French assistance, he nonetheless agreed to return to Ireland in March 1803 to organise the North in conjunction with the veteran of the Battle of Antrim, James Hope and with William Henry Hamilton. Forewarned by Templeton and as cautioned, on his arrival, by Francis McCracken and by the Simms brothers , Russell found the north subdued following the crushing of the 1798 rebellion and with little appetite for a renewed attempt.

Rebuffed by the United Irish remnant in north Down, Russell attempted to raise the standard in Defender country. On the morning of 22 July 1803, he addressed small groups of men in Annadorn and Loughinisland. He told them that there was to be a general insurrection throughout Ireland and that blows would be struck simultaneously at Dublin, Belfast and Downpatrick. He entreated them to join him but to no avail. One man said that they would be hanged like dogs. On a hill near Downpatrick where, dressed in his green uniform, Russell had expected to multitude, there were no more than three individuals, and of these, one objected that Ireland might as well be an English colony, as a French one.

For his biographer James Quinn, "the picture that emerges is of man with a tenuous grip on reality, maintaining a quixotic confidence in victory in the face of overwhelming evidence to the contrary". "The conviction and zeal that had enabled [Russell] to tap in Ulster's millennialist expectations in the 1790s" had "rendered him completely out of touch the disillusionment that followed the defeat in 1798". Hope, however, suggests that Russell had already contemplated the possibility that they had been duped by those in the Ascendancy who believed their position would be strengthened by a further failed rebellion: Hope informed Madden that Russell had said:

This conspiracy is the work of the enemy, we are now in its vortex—if we can swim ashore let it not be through innocent blood; if the people are true to themselves, we have an overwhelming force; if otherwise, we fall and our lives will be a sufficient sacrifice.

According to later trial evidence on 24 July, Russell as Member of the Provisional Government, and General in Chief of the Northern District issued (or intended to issue) the following proclamation:

Men of Ireland!--Once more in arms to assert the rights of mankind and liberate your country!--you see by the secrecy with which this effort has been conducted, by the multitudes in all parts of Ireland, who are engaged in executing this great object, that your provisional government has acted with wisdom.--- You will see that in Dublin, in the west, the north, and the south, the blow has been struck in the same moment. Your enemies can no more withstand than they could foresee this mighty exertion. The proclamation and regulations will shew that your interest and honour have been considered. Your general, appointed by that government to command in this district, has only to exhort you strongly to comply with these regulations. Your valour is well known; be as just and humane as you are brave, and then rely with confidence that God, with whom alone is victory, will crown your efforts with success.

The general orders that hostages shall be secured in all quarters; and hereby apprizes the English commander, that any outrage contrary to the acknowledged laws of war, and of morality, shall be retaliated in the severest manner. And he further makes known, that such Irish, as in ten days from the date of this, as are found in arms against their country, shall be treated as rebels, committed for trial, and their properties confiscated.-But all men behaving peaceably, shall be under the protection of the law.

Head-Quarters, July 24, 1803.

Unknown to Russell, in Dublin Emmet, unable to deliver promised firearms, could not draw Michael Dwyer's men down from the Wicklow Mountains nor mobilise the hoped-for support in Kildare. Plans to surprise Dublin Castle failed when his men prematurely revealed themselves, and finding many of those under his immediate command the worse for drink, he called the rising off.

== Trial and execution ==
Russell managed to hide for a number of weeks but on 9 September 1803 was arrested by Major Sirr in Dublin where he returned in hopes of rescuing Emmet (who had been captured on 25 August). Mary Ann sent £100 to Thomas Russell via Orr, which was to be used as a bribe “for the purpose of effecting his escape.” But without warning on the morning of the 12th he was transferred under heavy escort to Downpatrick Gaol.

There, on 3 October, the Rev. F. Archer, inspector of prisons, reported that he attended Russell at his own request "to administer the Sacrament which he received with apparently great devotion". When the service ended, Russell declared "in the awful presence of God" that he had been guilty of "many immoral acts", but as to his political opinions and actions, he had never intended "any other than the Advantage of my fellow creatures and even the Happiness of my Adversaries" and that whether the "thread" of his existence extended a further 40 years or was cut within the hour, he should not cease from the work he had begun.

Convicted of high treason in Downpatrick, on 12 October Russell was hanged and beheaded. His remains were buried in the graveyard of St Margaret's Church, Downpatrick, a grave paid for by his friend Mary Ann McCracken.

In remarks to the court before sentencing, Russell expressed surprise "to see gentlemen on the jury (looking at the grand jury box) who had often expressed and advocated political opinions similar to those on which he acted, and for which he had forfeited his life, for the sentiments publicly delivered by them, had assisted to influence his conduct". He afterwards told an officer that six of the jury (probably referring to persons on both grand and petty juries) had been United Irishmen.

In 1796 efforts to raise a yeomanry corps in Belfast had to be abandoned because of lack of support. On 5 April 1803, in response to rumours of Russell's mission, the town's citizens proclaimed their readiness to repel the attacks of foreign or domestic enemies, and two new corps were raised. Of the three lieutenants appointed two were all former United Irishmen: Robert Getty and Gilbert McIlveen.

The physician James MacDonnell, who had warned Russell that if he returned to Belfast he would find "a great difference in this place", subscribed 50 guineas to a public subscription for arrest. He later claimed that he had done so dispel suspicion of his own sudden departure from Belfast, a result of his being called away to perform an operation. They had been friends: MacDonnell had allowed Russell to lodge with him from October 1792 to February 1794 and, with Drennan, had helped him get the position at the Linen Hall library. He had corresponded with him while in Newgate (where Russell was treated by MacDonnell's Dublin counterpart and friend, Dr. Whitely Stokes). But MacDonnell had always taken issue with Russell's militant republicanism, suggesting that, just as in their shared scientific interests, his judgement in politics was often rash and, in working "all from first principles", naive.

Concluding his remarks to the court, Russell exhorted "those gentlemen who have all the wealth and power of the country in their hands" to "attend to the wants and distresses of the poor"-- "the labouring class of the community, their tenantry and dependants". While it might not secure their position, their solicitude may at least ensure that "their fall will be gentle".

In passing sentence on Russell, the Judge said that "he was sorry and surprised that a Gentleman of education could so pervert his understanding, as to imagine that he was acting either honourably, or religiously when he asserted to his ignorant followers what he knew was untrue, namely, that the French were [already] landed in great force at Ballywalter". The charge, based on the testimony of a state witness, greatly distressed Mary Ann McCracken who, on enquiry, satisfied herself that it was false. According to another witness, what Russell had offered was not that the French were ashore but that "they were to send thirty thousand arms to be landed at Kilkeel". (An attempt had been made at gun-running to the Down coast by the French in 1798)

In 1803 in London, Russell's brother, Captain John Russell (c.1748–c.1812), was also arrested in connection with the Emmet rising. He was released for lack of evidence, but the aspiring writer was associated with political radicals in the capital and may have had some role.

== Selected writing ==
- A Letter to the People of Ireland, on the present situation of the country. Belfast: Northern Star Office, 1796
- Journals and Memoirs of Thomas Russell, 1791-5, Dublin: Irish Academic Press, 1991, ISBN 0716524821

With William Sampson:

- Review of the Lion of Old England; or Democracy Confounded, Belfast: 1794.
- A faithful report of the trial of Hurdy-Gurdy, tried and convicted of a seditious libel in the court of King's Bench . . .,, (originally serialised in the Northern Star), Dublin: Bernard Dornin, 1806
