= William Putnam McCabe =

Irish emissary and organiser

- Born: 1776; Belfast, Kingdom of Ireland
- Died: 6 January 1821 (aged 44–45); Paris, Kingdom of France
- Movement: Society of United Irishmen

William Putnam McCabe (1776–1821) was an emissary and organiser in Ireland for the insurrectionary Society of United Irishmen. Facing multiple indictments for treason as a result of his role in fomenting the 1798 rebellion, he effected a number of daring escapes but was ultimately forced by his government pursuers into exile in France. With the favour of Napoleon, he established a cotton factory at Rouen while remaining active as a member of a new United Irish Directory. He worked to assist Robert Emmett in coordinating a new rising in Ireland in 1803, and later had contact with the Spencean circle in London implicated in both the Spa Field riots and the Cato Street Conspiracy.

In 1814, having ventured to Ireland, he was arrested and deported to Portugal. He returned again in 1817 and was imprisoned for eighteen months. McCabe died in Paris on 6 January 1821, age 46.

== Radical family ==
McCabe was the youngest of the three sons of Thomas McCabe, a watchmaker and cotton-mill pioneer in Belfast, and his first wife Jean (née Woolsey). The family were members of the First Presbyterian Church in Rosemary marked by a latitudinarian "New Light" teaching conducive to the enthusiasm for the American Revolution, and subsequently for the French Revolution, that animated the Volunteer movement in the town. McCabe's middle name was in honour of the American hero of Bunker Hill, Israel Putnam.

His father was renowned for having rallied members of the church and others in town in 1786 to oppose and defeat a proposal by the wealthy merchants and West-Indian slaveholders Waddell Cunningham and Thomas Greg to commission vessels in the port for the Middle Passage.

In October 1791, Thomas McCabe and other prominent friends of reform in Belfast, met with Wolf Tone to inaugurate the Society of United Irishmen. The Society, which quickly spread to Belfast's Presbyterian hinterlands, to Dublin and across the Catholic Midlands, resolved to secure for Ireland a national government accountable to a parliament in which "all the people", both Catholic and Protestant, rich and poor, should have "equal representation".

== United Irishman ==
Shortly after his father's business premises in Belfast had been ransacked by soldiers in February 1793, the young McCabe returned from a textile apprenticeship in Manchester, in his own words "imbued, not merely with the political, but, unfortunately also, with the religious opinions, of Paine". He joined his father in the Society of United Irishmen, working first with Samuel Neilson on the movement's paper, the Northern Star. Thomas Russell recorded an interview with McCabe and Neilson in April 1793 from which he understood that the people in the north were "burning with indignation" against the government (the British-Crown appointed executive in Dublin) and that they "have gone to the greatest lengths to hold out their hands [to] the nation [the Protestant Ascendancy who were alone represented in the Irish Parliament] to join them in reform but they have refused". With the French declaration of war against Britain in February 1793, the United Irishmen began to think in terms of a French assisted insurrection, and to organise accordingly.

With Russell and with Jemmy Hope, McCabe became a roving organiser for the Society across Ulster where in 1796 government reports identify him as the Society's provincial secretary. He made regular use of the contacts, and of the hospitality, offered by his fellow Freemasons. But for a northern Protestant, McCabe also had the unusual ability to move throughout the south. In his travels in the textile trade across the British Isles, McCabe had acquired a command of local accents and a talent for mimicry that made him a master of disguise. Among other roles, he assumed that of an itinerant preacher (changing halfway through his sermon to a discourse on the politics of the day), a mendicant, a farmer, a pedlar, and a British army recruiter (under which guise he persuaded a judge in Roscommon to release Richard Dry and other Catholic Defenders to his custody).

On his arrival at his destination, McCabe would organise supporters in groups of twelve and in order to help the country people to understand the organisation of the United Irishmen he would draw up plans so that "even persons of little education could understand how they were to act from a single society up to a Provincial Meeting".

The County Wexford-born historian, Louis Cullen believes that McCabe recruited John Kelly of Killanne and (one of Cullen's ancestors) Thomas Cloney of Moneyhore, the only two "Colonels" in the county who were to fight in the rebellion with distinction. That Kelly and Cloney were sworn United Irishmen in advance of the rebellion, however, has been disputed, and in general, there appears to be conflicting evidence of the level of organisation that McCabe actually achieved.

Such were the reports reaching London of McCabe travelling "about in all sorts of disguises", that Sir Charles Flint of the Irish office was persuaded that "next to Lord Edward Fitzgerald, McCabe was the life and soul of the 1798 rebellion".

== Rebellion and exile ==
=== 1798 ===
McCabe was arrested in Dublin in May 1798, just before the outbreak of the rebellion, while escorting the United Irish leader Lord Edward FitzGerald. While Fitzgerald escaped, McCabe convinced his captors, a party of Dumbarton Fencibles, that he was an innocent Scottish weaver looking for employment and was released. He then appeared among rebels in Kildare (where a government spy reports McCabe confessing to having seen action), and, in September, with French General Humbert's small landing force in Mayo.

In October 1798, McCabe left Ireland, living for a time quietly in Wales. He married (under the name Lee) to Elizabeth McNeil (née Lockhart) a widow, by whom he had one child, a daughter. Before the end of 1801, the family withdrew to France. Before departing for the Continent McCabe travelled to Scotland, where he made contact with the United Irish leaders imprisoned in Fort George and among whom he seems to have won the confidence of Thomas Russell and William Dowdall. Then, travelling to Hamburg on an American passport, he made contact with Pamela FitzGerald, Lord Edward's widow, before eventually arriving in Paris.

With Robert Emmet, McCabe was one of a number of young militants determined to reconstruct the Society on a strict military-conspiratorial basis. Members were to be chosen personally by its officers, meeting as the executive directory. The immediate aim of the reconstituted society was, in conjunction with simultaneous risings in Ireland and England to again solicit a French invasion. For the new United Irish Directory in exile he undertook a number of missions, with reports of his presence in London, Manchester, Nottingham, Stockport, Glasgow, Paisley, Belfast and Dublin. The early historian of the United Irishmen, R. R. Madden, connects McCabe to the "desperate project" of Edward Despard, the United Irishman and "United Briton" who was executed in February 1803 as the alleged ringleader of a plot against King and Parliament.

=== Emigre and emissary ===
In 1802, in partnership with the Dublin merchant Philip Long, McCabe established a cotton mill in Rouen. The factory was visited by Napoleon who, welcoming its output as a substitution for English imports, endowed the enterprise with 4,000 francs. McCabe's establishment became a rendezvous for the Irish exiles arriving in France and there, the British government understood, McCabe trained emissaries and stored arms to be sent in support of Robert Emmet's rising in 1803.

When Emmet's rising failed, and after the Battle of Trafalgar in 1805 eliminated any prospect of a French invasion, McCabe made contact with the British government. According to the home office papers of Sir Charles Flint, head of the aliens office in London, McCabe expressed his disillusionment with the French government (Napoleon remained fixed, not on Ireland, but on the re-enslavement of Haiti) in overtures to Ulster-born Lord Castlereagh and to Castlereagh's successor as Chief Secretary for Ireland, Arthur Wellesley. Through the prime minister's private secretary, William Dacre Adams, he also made an approach to William Pitt. Negotiations led to some relaxation of his banishment so far as England and Scotland were concerned, but Ireland remained prohibited.

=== Double agent speculation ===
Among the exiles in Paris, Arthur O’Connor, following his marriage in 1807 to the daughter of the Marquis de Condorcet, borrowed money from McCabe to acquire a country residence. O’Connor's tardiness in repaying the debt to McCabe, whose investments into cotton spinning in Rouen failed, resulted in legal proceedings (which McCabe's daughter, Elizabeth Nesbitt was to continue, after his death). Cathal O'Bryne suggests that the debt was behind O'Connor's later suggestion to R. R. Madden that McCabe had been a double agent, a charge to which, Madden notes, the French government lent no credence.

In her 1948 biography of Emmet, Helen Landreth, offers a very different account of McCabe's relationship with O'Connor. She proposes that the French had evidence of McCabe double-dealing, but that O'Connor interceded on his behalf. She suspects that from 1802 both men had been agents of a plot sanctioned by William Pitt (then out of office, but anticipating his return as Prime Minister), and directed from Dublin Castle by the Chief Secretary William Wickham and under Secretary Alexander Marsden. This was to encourage the most dangerously disaffected in Ireland to fatally compromise the prospects for an effective revolt by acting in advance of a French invasion. Emmet was their unwitting instrument, drawn home from Paris for the purpose of organising a rising by McCabe's misrepresentations of conditions in Ireland and with O'Connor's encouragement.

Landreth writes that "there is no documentary proof that McCabe was a government agent until 1818, when he was in gaol in Dublin and was writing various government officials as a subsidised employee of long standing. But she does not quote or cite her sources. Emmet biographer Patrick Geoghegan finds Landreth's argument entirely circumstantial and unconvincing.

=== Last conspiratorial connections ===
At the beginning of 1814, for the purpose of pursuing his suit with O'Connor, McCabe returned to Dublin. He was arrested and transferred to London, where he was interrogated at the Home Office. Pleading that his only cause had been to restore some measure of his ruined fortune, he was returned to exile, and placed on a ship for Portugal. Undeterred, McCabe returned to Ireland again in 1817, accompanied by his daughter, but was denounced in Belfast by his stepmother, who wanted to cut him out of his late father's estate. He was imprisoned in Kilmainham for eighteen months, in conditions that weakened his health.

When friends applied for his release, on the plea that he only travelled on his own business, the Home Secretary replied: ‘"It might be true that Mr McCabe never went to any part of England or Ireland except upon business of his own; but it was very extraordinary that, in whatever part of the king's dominions his own business brought him, some public disturbance was sure to take place". In 1819 McCabe, evading arresting officers, reappeared in Glasgow, where disturbances did take place. In March 1820 there was a week of strikes in the town, the so-called Radical War.

Madden also suggests connections between McCabe and replays in London of the Despard Plot: the Spa Field riots and the attempted seizure of the Tower of London in December 1816, and the Cato Street Conspiracy to murder members of the British cabinet, including Lord Castlereagh, in February 1820. In 1814 there are French police reports of several members of this Spencean circle involved in these incidents contacting Irish emigres in Paris, including McCabe (alias "Cato"). This reportedly led to McCabe's secret return to London and his presence at the attempted uprising on 2 December 1816.

McCabe died in Paris on 6 January 1821 and was buried there in the Vaugirard Cemetery.
