= Northern Star (newspaper of the Society of United Irishmen) =

The Northern Star was the newspaper of the Society of United Irishmen, which was published from 1792 until its suppression in May 1797 by a group of Monaghan militiamen.

== Origin ==
The publication of an Irish newspaper that reflected and disseminated liberal views was an early goal of Irish republicans in the late 18th century. By the founding of the Society of United Irishmen in October 1791, the project was well underway and the first edition of the Northern Star appeared in Belfast on 1 January 1792 and was published twice a week at the price of two pence, a penny of which was for the government stamp (the newspaper tax). Among the paper's twelve financial backers (all of whom were Presbyterian merchants), Samuel Neilson (who had pledged his woollen business to the paper) was the publisher and editor.

== Content ==
"The public will our guide, the public good our end": Masthead of the Northern Star

Political content dominated the Northern Star but its publication of local news, as opposed to the focus on British and international affairs of other Irish newspapers of the time, brought it wide popularity. Leading members of the United Irishmen, among them William Sampson, Thomas Russell and James Porter, were regular contributors and mixed direct political analyses with cutting political satire.

William Orr was among those who contributed to its content, his letters would lead to his eventual arrest and execution under the Insurrection Act 1797 (37 Geo. 3. c. 38 (I)). The newspaper also enjoyed an excellent voluntary distribution network as its penetration followed rapidly wherever the United Irishmen set up new branches. It was estimated that for each copy of the Northern Star sold there were at least five readers, as the reading aloud of articles from the paper was a regular feature of United Irish meetings.

The newspaper was initially protected from the authorities due to the support of well-connected liberals but following the outbreak of war between Britain and Revolutionary France in 1793 and the subsequent banning of the United Irishmen as a seditious body it began to draw increasing attention. The massive popularity of the newspaper protected it from serious harassment until January 1797 when the establishment went into a state of panic following the French invasion scare at Bantry Bay. The paper was alleged to be behind the Dublin-based Union Star, a militant, low-circulation newssheet, often posted in public places, which specialized in naming informers, "notorious Orangemen", and other enemies of the United Irishmen, being regarded by Dublin Castle as a republican hitlist.

== Suppression ==
The extensive distribution network and potency of the Northern Star in spreading United Irish opinion alarmed the authorities and possession of a copy came to be regarded as an admission of seditious intent. The end finally came with the uncovering of supposed United Irish infiltration of the Monaghan militia in Belfast, which resulted in the execution of four soldiers. General Lake, already engaged in a brutal counter-insurgency campaign (the "dragooning" of Ulster) was quick to put much of the blame on the Northern Star and requested permission to suppress the paper.

In the event official suppression was not necessary as on 19 May 1797, three days after the execution of their ex-comrades, a mob of Monaghan militiamen anxious to prove their loyalty attacked the offices of the Northern Star and destroyed not only the printing presses but the building itself. The attack resulted in the demise of the Northern Star to the undoubted satisfaction of the authorities as no action was taken against those involved in the destruction. The Chartist movement later paid tribute to the Northern Star by using the same name for their newspaper that was founded in 1837 by Feargus O'Connor.

== Sources ==
- Brian Inglis, Freedom of the Press in Ireland, 1784-1841 (London, 1954). ISBN B0000CIVP3
- A.T.Q Stewart, The Summer Soldiers (Belfast, 1995). ISBN 0-85640-558-2
