= John MacDonnell (surgeon) =

Irish surgeon (1796–1892)

- Born: 11 February 1796; Belfast, Ireland
- Died: 20 January 1892 (aged 95); Dublin
- Education: the Belfast Academy, and Trinity College Dublin
- Occupation: surgeon
- Employer: surgeon in the Richmond Hospital
- Organization(s): a member of the board of examiners, professor of descriptive anatomy at the RCSI, and medical member of the Poor Law Commission

John MacDonnell (11 February 1796 – 20 January 1892) was an Irish surgeon and pioneer of surgical anaesthesia in Ireland.

== Life and family ==
John MacDonnell was born in 15 Donegall Place, Belfast on 11 February 1796. His parents were James, a prominent physician and civic leader, and Elizabeth MacDonnell (née Clarke, died 1798). He had one older brother, Alexander, and a sister. He attended the Belfast Academy, and later Trinity College Dublin, graduating with a BA in 1818. From 1813 he was apprenticed to Richard Carmichael. Carmichael became MacDonnell's patron and friend, eventually bequeathing MacDonnell £5,000 and appointing him executor of his estate. MacDonnell also studied at Richmond Hospital, and in 1821 received his LRCSI. He studied in London, Edinburgh and Paris, graduating from Edinburgh with his MD in 1825.

In 1826 he married Charity Dobbs (died 1890). They had 6 sons and 5 daughters, including Robert, Alexander, and Barbara. He died at his home on Fitzwilliam Square, Dublin on 20 January 1892. He is buried in the family plot at Kilsharvan graveyard, County Meath.

== Career ==
In 1827, MacDonnell established his practice in Dublin, becoming a member of the Royal College of Surgeons in Ireland (RCSI) and the Royal Irish Academy the same year. He became a demonstrator in anatomy and subsequently lecturer in anatomy and physiology at the Richmond Hospital School, later known as the Carmichael School of Medicine. He went on to become a proprietor of the school. In 1835 he was appointed a foundation professor of surgery in the Belfast Academical Institution but never served in the role, a position he resigned in 1836 to take up an appointment as surgeon to the Richmond Hospital.

MacDonnell was the first surgeon to operate using general anaesthesia in Ireland. He was scheduled to perform the amputation of an arm from an 18-year-old woman, Mary Kane on 31 December 1846. The day before the surgery he read an article in the British and Foreign Medical Review entitled "On a new means of rendering surgical operations painless" which described the use of ether inhalation during surgery in the United States and London. He postponed the amputation to construct an ether dispenser and conduct experiments on himself. On 1 January 1847, he performed the amputation with the assistance of four surgeons, including Carmichael, successfully anaesthetising the patient for the procedure. The surgery was watched by fellow doctors and medical students. Later that evening he reported the procedure as "Amputation of the arm, performed at the Richmond Hospital, without pain", submitted to the Dublin Medical Press for publication. He recognised that his apparatus was crude and not fit for long operations, and proposed that experiments should be conducted on animals to further establish the ratio of air and ether to be used on patients. He was appointed to a committee of the Surgical Society of Ireland created to further examine the application of ether in surgery, which reported on 20 January 1847. They warned of the dangers of using ether on patients with pulmonary or cardiac conditions.

In 1844, he was appointed as a member of the board of examiners, and later professor of descriptive anatomy at the RCSI from 1847 and 1851. He resigned his professorship to become medical member of the Poor Law Commission from 1851 to 1876, staying on in this post after the commission was absorbed into the Local Government Board. From 1842 to 1846, MacDonnell was editor of the Dublin Journal of Medical Science, as well as contributing a number of papers to journals. In 1884, he published a monograph on the work of Charles Darwin. In 1879 he published a history, The Ulster civil war of 1641, in which he sought to vindicate his ancestor Sir Alexander Macdonnell, 1st Baronet against charges of cruelty. He also published a pamphlet in 1886, The light of history respecting the massacres in Ireland from about A.D. 1580 to the end of the civil war of 1641.
