= Alexander MacDonnell =

Alexander MacDonnell may refer to:

- Sir Alexander Macdonnell (died 1634), of the Macdonnell baronets of Maye
- Sir Alexander Macdonnell, 1st Baronet (1794–1875), of the Macdonnell baronets of Kilsharvan
- Alexander MacDonnell, 3rd Earl of Antrim (1615–1699)
- Alastair Ruadh MacDonnell (c. 1725–1761), also called Alexander

== See also ==
- Alexander McDonnell (disambiguation)
- Alexander Macdonell (disambiguation)
