= Barbara McDonnell =

- Born: 1847? Dublin, Ireland
- Died: 1928 (aged 80–81)
- Resting place: Layde, Cushendall

Barbara McDonnell (1847?–1928) was an Irish philanthropist.

== Life ==
Barbara Montgomery McDonnell was born around 1847 in Dublin. She was the youngest daughter of a prominent surgeon, John MacDonnell, and Charity MacDonnell (née Dobbs). She had three sisters and six brothers. Two of her brothers were Robert McDonnell and Alexander McDonnell. Her paternal grandfather was James MacDonnell, and her uncle was Sir Alexander Macdonnell. Her maternal great-great-grandfather was Arthur Dobbs. McDonnell's early life was spent in Dublin, but then the family moved to Cushendall, County Antrim around 1885. Her elder sisters, Rose Emily McDonnell and Catherine Anne Stewart McDonnell, founded a cottage hospital in Cushendall in August 1885. The hospital eventually became part of the National Health Service. It is possible that McDonnell was the "cultured lady from Cushendall and trained in nursing" who took up the position as the first matron of Coleraine Cottage Hospital. This hospital was founded in 1894, modelled on the Cushendall hospital.

McDonnell founded a toy factory in Cushendall in 1900, employing local people and promoting wood working skills. The toys proved popular, and were sold in Ireland as well as England and the United States after they were exhibited at 1904 the St Louis World's Fair. It was craftsmen from Cushendall made dolls' house furniture for the National Museum of Ireland. The factory closed in 1914 during World War I due to a lack of available labour. At this time McDonnell helped to nurse returned wounded soldiers from the war, at which time she was in her 70s.

McDonnell was unanimously chosen as the president of the first Glens of Antrim Feis in the summer of 1904, as she had a particular interest in the Irish language and other traditions. She resigned in October 1904 in protest at the takeover of the event by Belfast.

She died on 29 December 1928, and is buried at Layde, Cushendall on 2 January 1929.
