= Photophore (disambiguation) =

Photophores are light-emitting organs found in various marine animals.

Photophore may also refer to:

- An instrument (a type of endoscope) used to observe internal organs and tissues
- A wax candle holder used in home decoration that creates ambiance once lit
