= Endoscope =

Medical instrument

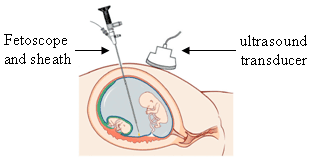
Drawing of an endoscope for fetal detection, or "fetoscope"

An endoscope is an inspection instrument composed of an image sensor, optical lens, a light source and a mechanical device, which is used to look deep into the body by openings such as the mouth or anus. A typical endoscope applies several modern technologies including optics, ergonomics, precision mechanics, electronics, and software engineering. With an endoscope, it is possible to observe lesions that cannot be detected by X-ray, making it useful in medical diagnosis. An endoscope uses tubes only a few millimeters thick to transfer illumination in one direction and high-resolution video in the other, allowing minimally invasive surgeries. It is used to examine the internal organs like the throat or esophagus. Specialized instruments are named after their target organ. Examples include the cystoscope (bladder), nephroscope (kidney), bronchoscope (bronchus), arthroscope (joints) and colonoscope (colon), and laparoscope (abdomen or pelvis). They can be used to examine visually and diagnose, or assist in surgery such as an arthroscopy.

== Etymology ==
"Endo-" is a scientific Latin prefix derived from Ancient Greek ἐνδο- (endo-) meaning "within", and "-scope" comes from the modern Latin "-scopium", from the Greek σκοπεῖν (skopein) meaning to "look at" or "to examine".

== History ==
Drawings of Bozzini's "Lichtleiter", an early endoscope

The first endoscope was developed in 1806 by German physician Philipp Bozzini with his introduction of a "Lichtleiter" (light conductor) "for the examinations of the canals and cavities of the human body". However, the College of Physicians in Vienna disapproved of such curiosity. The first effective open-tube endoscope was developed by French physician Antonin Jean Desormeaux. He was also the first one to use an endoscope in a successful operation.

After the invention of the lightbulb, the use of electric light was a major step in the improvement of endoscope. The first such lights were external although sufficiently capable of illumination to allow cystoscopy, hysteroscopy and sigmoidoscopy as well as examination of the nasal (and later thoracic) cavities as was being performed routinely in human patients by Sir Francis Cruise (using his own commercially available endoscope) by 1865 in the Mater Misericordiae Hospital in Dublin, Ireland. Later, smaller bulbs became available making internal light possible, for instance in a hysteroscope by Charles David in 1908.

Hans Christian Jacobaeus has been given credit for the first large published series of endoscopic explorations of the abdomen and the thorax with laparoscope (1912) and thoracoscope (1910) although the first reported thoracoscopic examination in a human was also by Cruise.

Laparoscope was used in the diagnosis of liver and gallbladder disease by Heinz Kalk in the 1930s. Hope reported in 1937 on the use of laparoscopy to diagnose ectopic pregnancy. In 1944, Raoul Palmer placed his patients in the Trendelenburg position after gaseous distention of the abdomen and thus was able to reliably perform gynecologic laparoscope.

Georg Wolf, a Berlin manufacturer of rigid endoscopes established in 1906, produced the Sussmann flexible gastroscope in 1911. Karl Storz began producing instruments for ENT specialists in 1945 through his company, Karl Storz GmbH.

=== Fiber optics ===
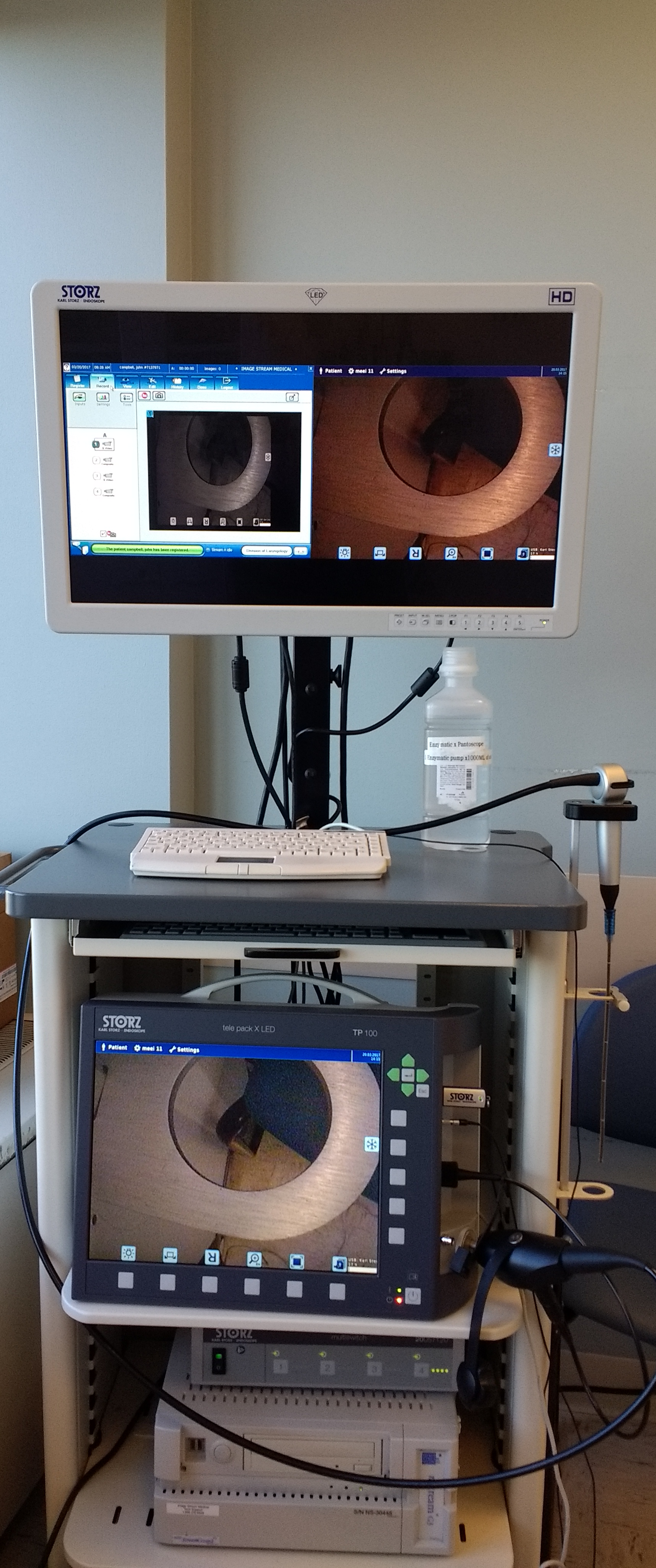
A Storz endoscopy unit used for laryngoscopy exams of the vocal folds and the glottis

Basil Hirschowitz, Larry Curtiss, and Wilbur Peters invented the first fiber optic endoscope in 1957. Earlier in the 1950s Harold Hopkins had designed a "fibroscope" consisting of a bundle of flexible glass fibres able to coherently transmit an image. This proved useful both medically and industrially, and subsequent research led to further improvements in image quality.

The previous practice of a small filament lamp on the tip of the endoscope had left the choice of either viewing in a dim red light or increasing the light output – which carried the risk of burning the inside of the patient. Alongside the advances to the optics, the ability to 'steer' the tip was developed, as well as innovations in remotely operated surgical instruments contained within the body of the endoscope itself. This was the beginning of "key-hole surgery" as we know it today.

=== Rod-lens endoscopes ===
There were physical limits to the image quality of a fibroscope. A bundle of 50,000 fibers would only give a 50,000-pixel image, and continued flexing from use breaks fibers and progressively loses pixels. Eventually, so many are lost that the whole bundle must be replaced at a considerable expense. Harold Hopkins realised that any further optical improvement would require a different approach. Previous rigid endoscopes suffered from low light transmittance and poor image quality. The surgical requirement of passing surgical tools as well as the illumination system within the endoscope's tube which itself is limited in dimensions by the human body left very little room for the imaging optics. The tiny lenses of a conventional system required supporting rings that would obscure the bulk of the lens' area. They were also hard to manufacture and assemble and optically nearly useless.

The elegant solution that Hopkins arrived at was to fill the air-spaces between the 'little lenses' with rods of glass. These rods fitted exactly the endoscope's tube making them self-aligning and requiring of no other support. They were much easier to handle and utilised the maximum possible diameter available.

With the appropriate curvature and coatings to the rod ends and optimal choices of glass-types, all calculated and specified by Hopkins, the image quality was transformed even with tubes of only 1mm in diameter. With a high quality 'telescope' of such small diameter the tools and illumination system could be housed within an outer tube. The first of these new endoscopes was produced by Karl Storz.

Whilst there are regions of the body that will always require flexible endoscopes (principally the gastrointestinal tract), the rigid rod-lens endoscopes still has great performance and they are the preferred instrument and have enabled modern key-hole surgery. (Harold Hopkins was recognized and honoured for his advancement of medical-optic by the medical community worldwide. It formed a major part of the citation when he was awarded the Rumford Medal by the Royal Society in 1984.)

== Composition ==
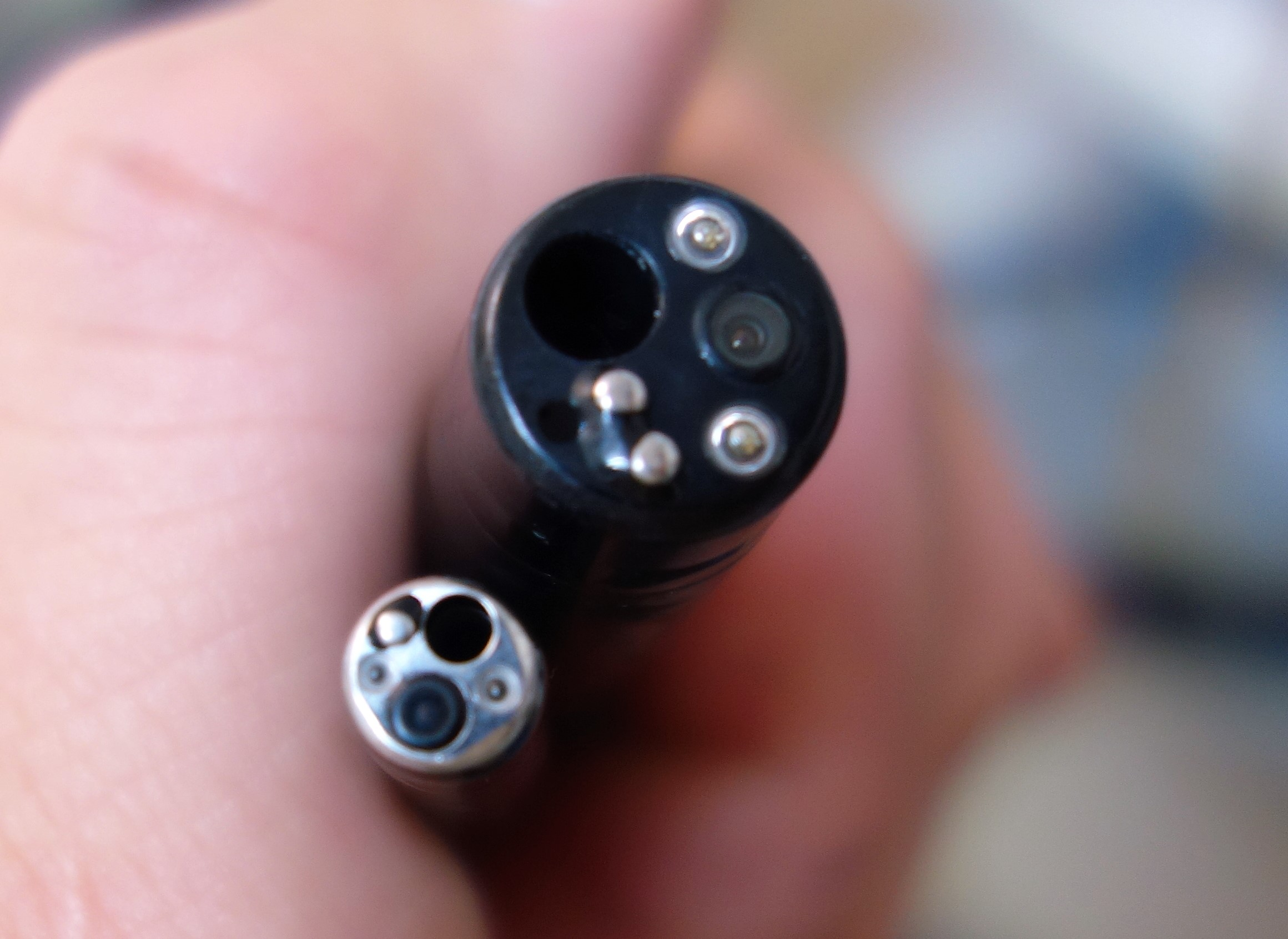
The insertion tip of an endoscope

A typical endoscope is composed of following parts:

- A rigid or flexible tube as a body.
- A light transmission system that illuminates the object to be inspected. For the light source, it is usually located outside the scope body.
- A lens system that transmits the image from the objective lens to the observer, usually a relay lens system in the case of a rigid endoscope or a bundle of optical fibers in the case of a fiberoptic endoscope.
- An eyepiece which transmits the image to the screen in order to capture it. However, modern videoscopes require no eyepiece.
- An additional channel for medical instruments or manipulators (only for a multi-function endoscope, see below in "Classification").

Besides, patients undergoing endoscopy procedure may be offered sedation in order to avoid discomfort.

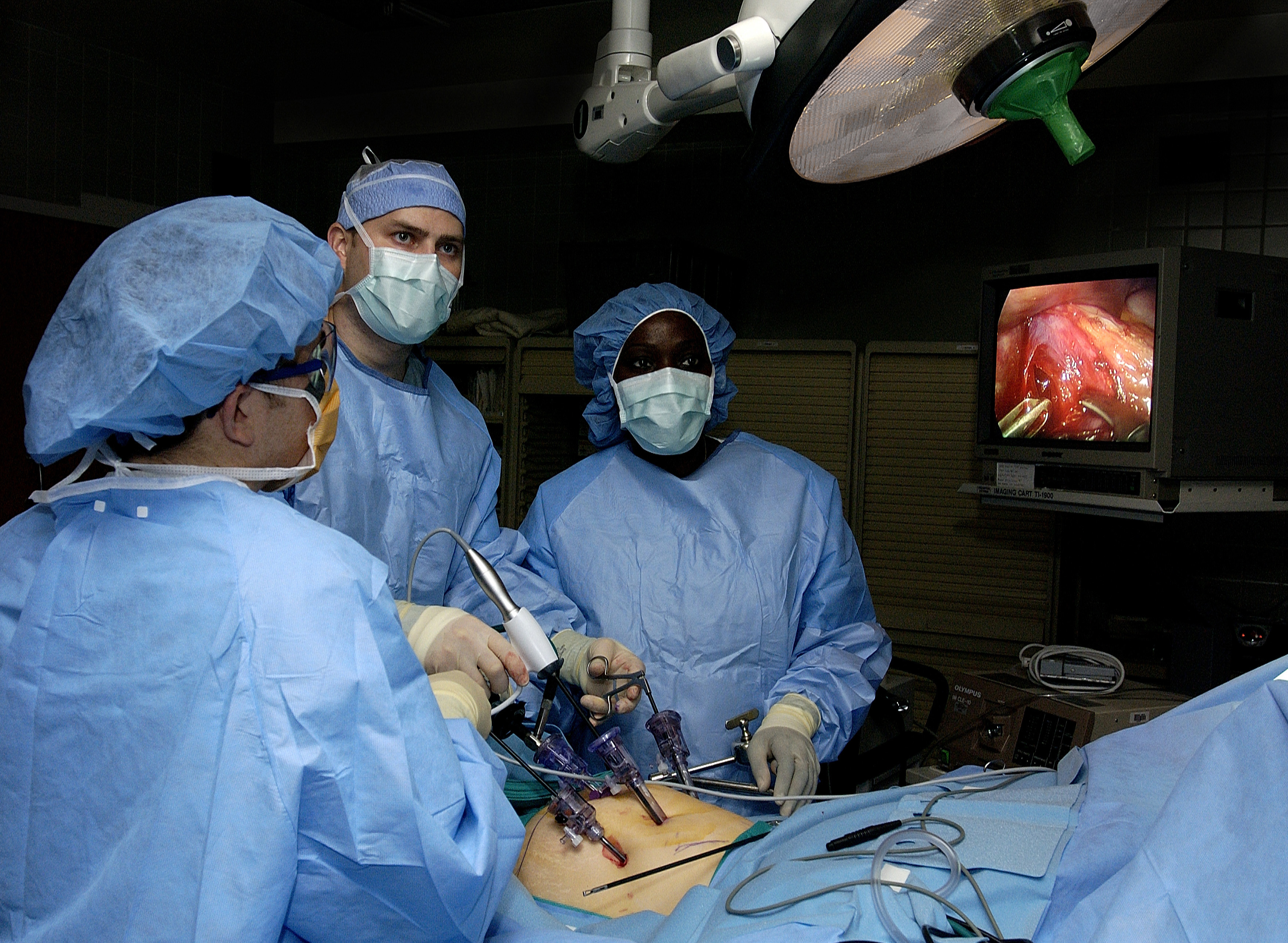
Laparoscopic surgery

== Clinical application ==
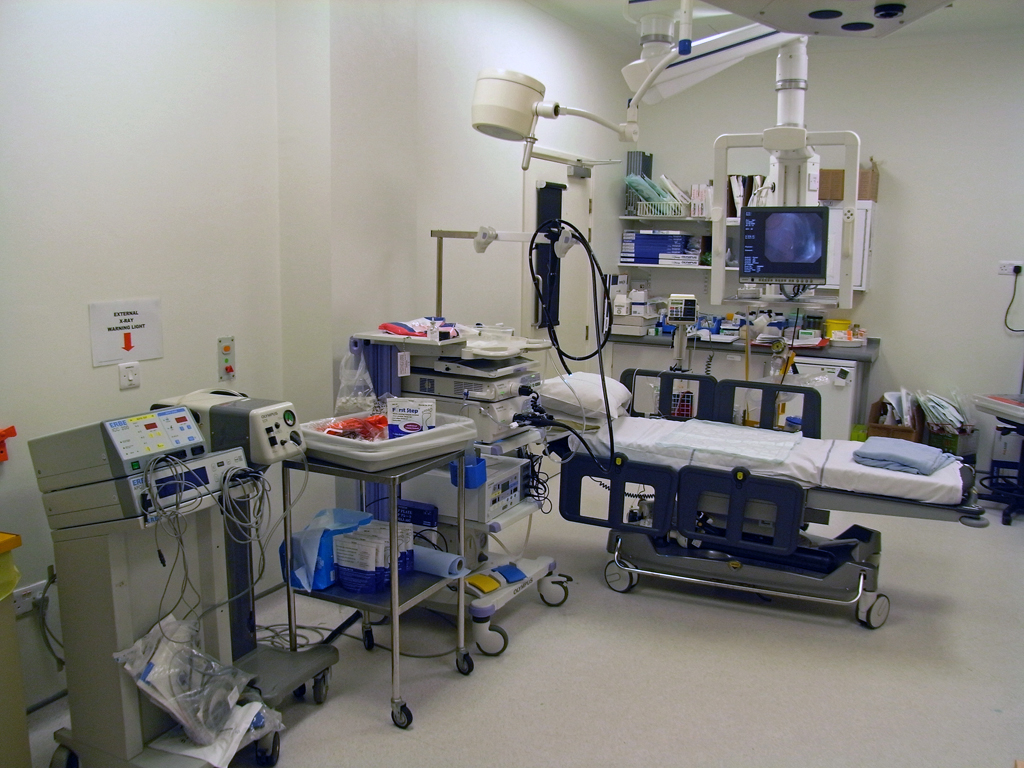
An endoscopy room in a hospital

Endoscopes may be used to investigate symptoms in the digestive system including nausea, vomiting, abdominal pain, difficulty swallowing, and gastrointestinal bleeding. It is also used in diagnosis, most commonly by performing a biopsy to check for conditions such as anemia, bleeding, inflammation, and cancers of the digestive system. The procedure may also be used for treatment such as cauterization of a bleeding vessel, widening a narrow esophagus, clipping off a polyp or removing a foreign object.

Health care workers can use endoscopes to review the following body parts:

- The gastrointestinal tract:
  - Esophagus: chronic esophagitis, esophageal varices, esophageal hiatal hernia, esophageal leiomyoma, esophageal cancer, cardiac cancer, etc.
  - Stomach and duodenum: chronic gastritis, gastric ulcer, benign gastric tumor, gastric cancer, duodenal ulcer, duodenal tumor.
  - Small intestine: small intestine neoplasms, smooth muscle tumors, sarcomas, polyps, lymphomas, inflammation, etc.
  - Large intestine: nonspecific ulcerative colitis, Crohn's disease, chronic colitis, colonic polyps, colorectal cancer, etc.
  - The pancreas and biliary tract: pancreatic cancer, cholangitis, cholangiocarcinoma, liver disease, biliary disease, etc.
- The respiratory tract:
  - lung cancer, transbronchoscopy lung biopsy, selective bronchography, etc.
- The urinary tract:
  - cystitis, bladder conjugation, bladder tumor, renal tuberculosis, renal stones, renal tumors, congenital malformations of ureter, ureteral stones, ureteral tumors, etc.
- The ear, nose and throat:
  - Ear: tympanitis, inner ear deformity, etc.
  - Nose: rhinitis, nasal polyp, etc.
  - Throat: retropharyngeal abscess, specific infection, etc.

== Classification ==
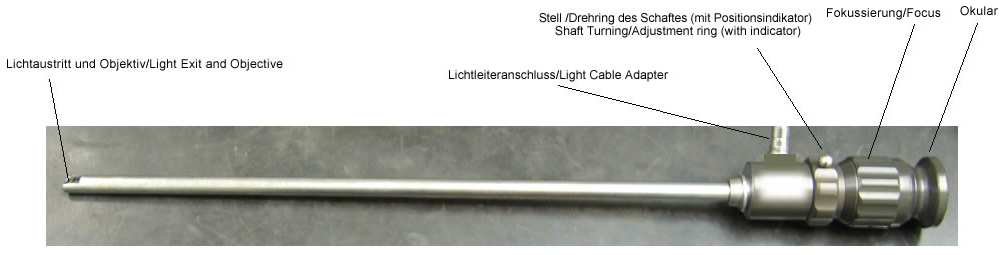
A rigid endoscope

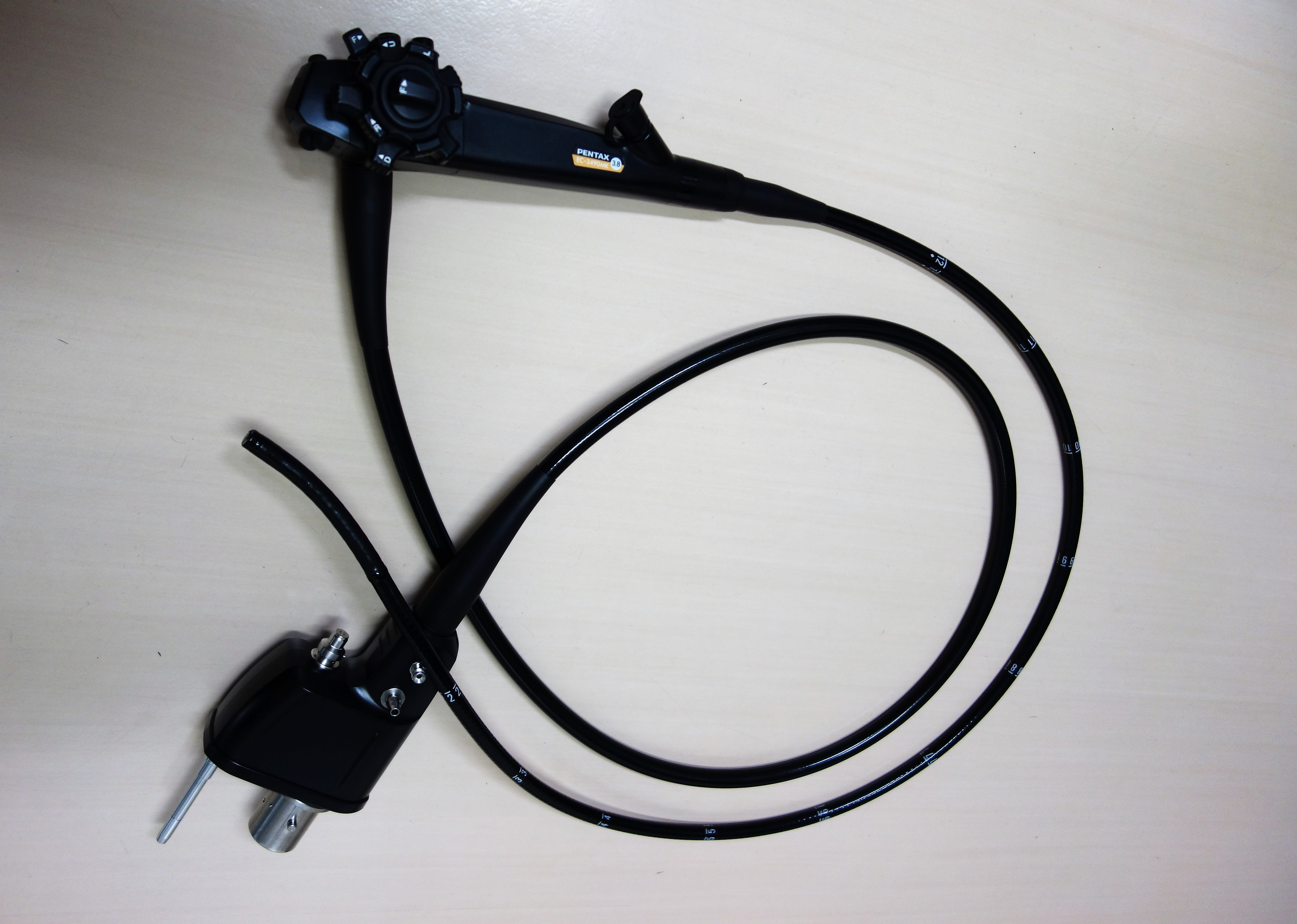
A flexible endoscope

There are many different types of endoscopes for medical examination, so are their classification methods. Generally speaking, the following three classifications are more common:

- According to functions of the endoscope:
  - single-function endoscope: A single-function endoscope refers to an observation mirror that only has an optical system with it.
  - multi-function endoscope: For a multi-functional endoscope, in addition to the function of observation, it also has at least one working channel like lighting, surgery, flushing and other functions.
- According to detection areas reached by the endoscope:
  - enteroscope
  - otoscope
  - colonoscope
  - rhinoscope
  - arthroscope
  - laparoscope
  - etc.
- According to rigidity of the endoscope:
  - rigid endoscope: A rigid endoscope is a prismatic optical system with advantages of clear imaging, multiple working channels and multiple viewpoints.
  - flexible endoscope: A flexible endoscope is an optical-fiber-based system. Notable features of a flexible endoscope include that the lens can be manipulated by the operator to change direction, but the imaging quality is not as good as a rigid one.

== Recent developments ==
=== Robot assisted surgery ===
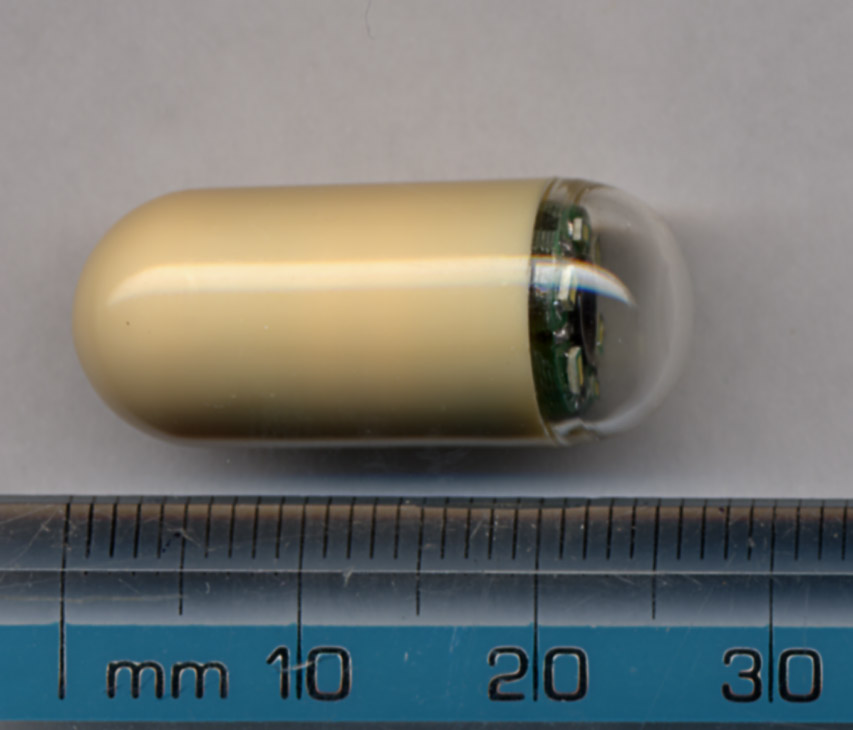
A capsule endoscope

With the development and application of robotic systems, especially surgical robotics, remote surgery has been introduced, in which the surgeon could be at a site far away from the patient. The first remote surgery was called the Lindbergh Operation. And a wireless oesophageal pH measuring devices can now be placed endoscopically, to record ph trends in an area remotely.

=== Endoscopy VR simulators ===
Virtual reality simulators are being developed for training doctors on various endoscopy skills.

=== Disposable endoscopy ===
Disposable endoscopy is an emerging category of endoscopic instruments. Recent developments have allowed the manufacture of endoscopes inexpensive enough to be used on a single patient only. It is meeting a growing demand to lessen the risk of cross contamination and hospital acquired diseases. A European consortium of the SME is working on the DUET (disposable use of endoscopy tool) project to build a disposable endoscope.

=== Capsule endoscopy ===
Capsule endoscopes are pill-sized imaging devices that are swallowed by a patient and then record images of the gastrointestinal tract as they pass through naturally. Images are typically retrieved via wireless data transfer to an external receiver.

=== Augmented reality ===
The endoscopic images can be combined with other image sources using augmented reality to provide the surgeon with additional information. For instance, the position of an anatomical structure or tumor might be shown in the endoscopic video.

=== Image enhancement ===
Emerging endoscope technologies measure additional properties of light such as optical polarization, optical phase, and additional wavelengths of light to improve contrast.

== Non-medical uses ==
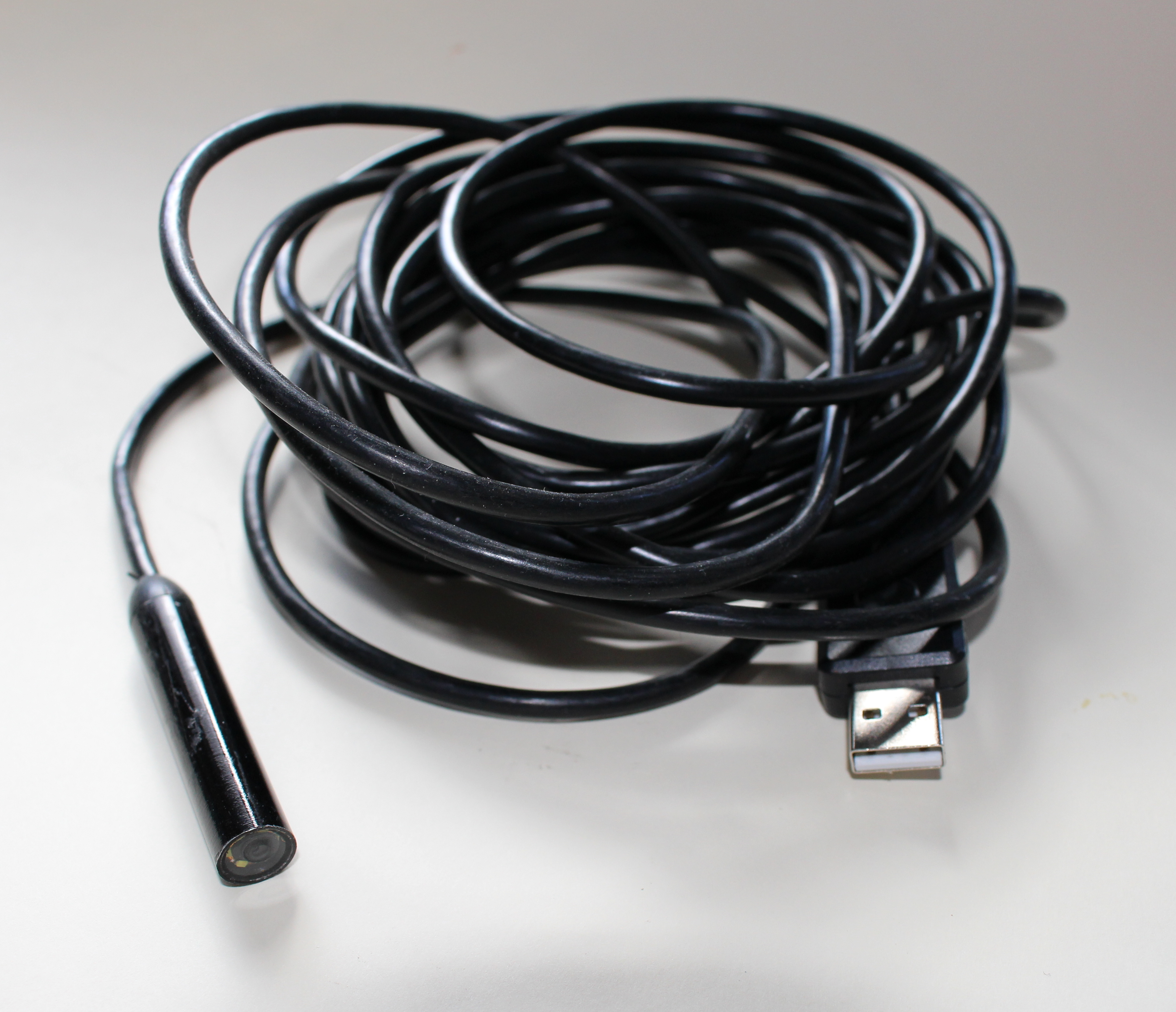
A low-cost waterproof USB endoscope for non-medical use

In addition to medical uses, endoscopes are also widely used in industrial fields, especially in nondestructive testing and hole exploration. Endoscopes can be used for internal visual inspection of pipes, boilers, cylinders, motors, reactors, heat exchangers, turbines, and other products with narrow, inaccessible cavities and/or channels. In such applications they are commonly known as borescopes.

== See also ==
- Medical device
- Endoscopy
- Surgery
- Anesthesia
- Minimally invasive procedure
- Robot assisted surgery
