= Gasogene (disambiguation) =

The word gasogene can refer to:

- Gasogene, a device for producing carbonated water
- Gasogene engine, a process that converts organic or fossil fuel based carbonaceous materials into carbon monoxide, hydrogen and carbon dioxide
- Wood gas generator a specific type of gasogene engine that converts wood into fuel that can be used to power an internal combustion engine
- Gasogene Lamp a form of illumination used in early endoscopy before the invention of electric lighting
