= National school (Ireland) =

Primary level schools in Ireland

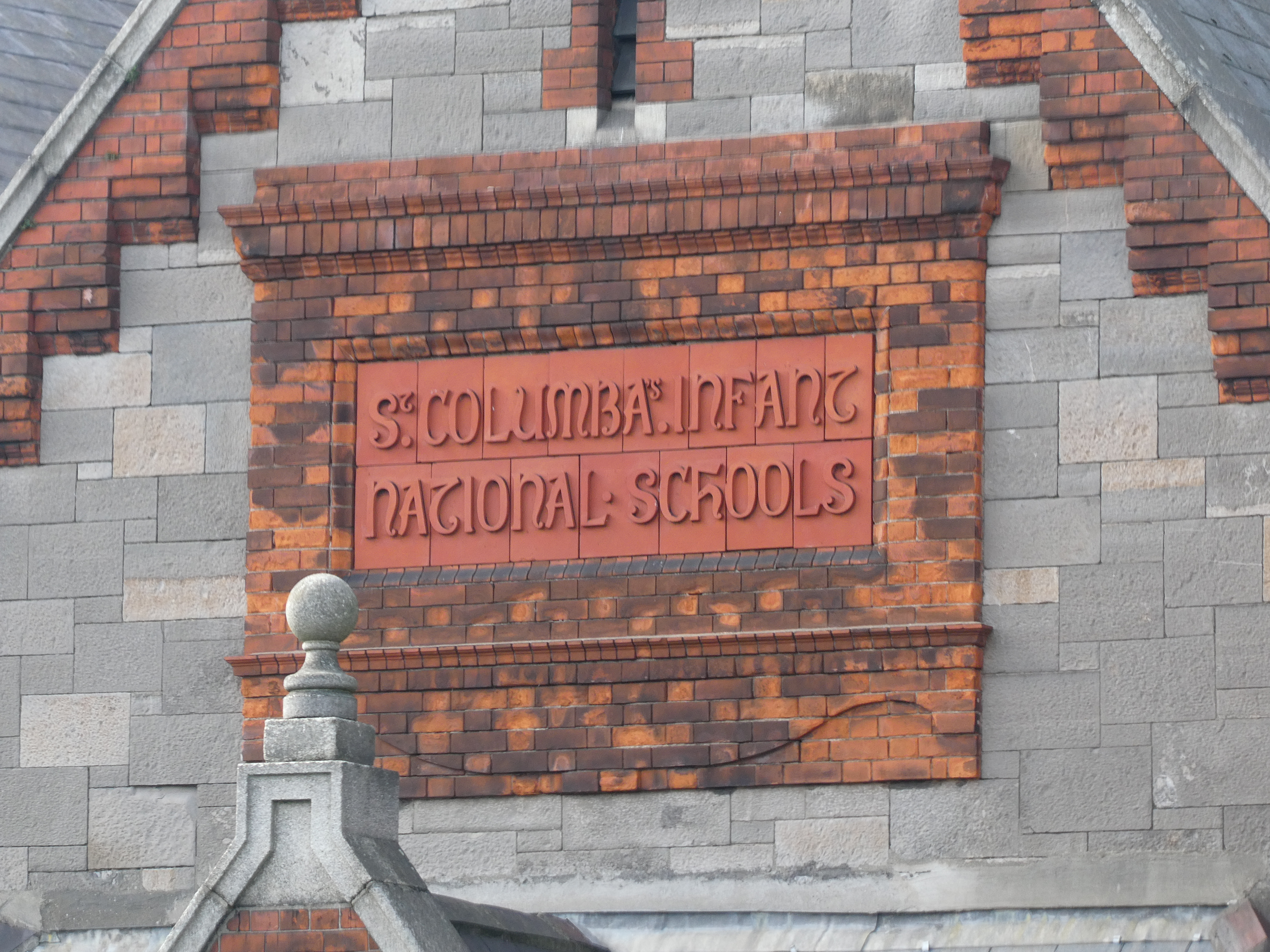
Sign at St Columba's Infant National Schools, North Strand, Dublin

In Ireland, a national school (Irish: scoil náisiúnta) is a type of primary school that is financed directly by the state, but typically administered jointly by the state, a patron body, and local representatives. In national schools, most major policies, such as the curriculum and teacher salaries and conditions, are managed by the state through the Department of Education. Minor policies of the school are managed by local people, sometimes directed by a member of the clergy, as representative of the patron, through a local 'board of management'. Most primary schools in Ireland fall into this category, which is a pre-independence concept.

While there are other forms of primary school in Ireland, including a relatively small number of private denominational schools which do not receive state aid, there were just 34 such private primary schools in 2012, with a combined enrollment of 7,600 pupils. By comparison there were, as of 2019, over 3,200 national schools in Ireland with a combined enrollment of 567,000 pupils. In Northern Ireland, the equivalent to a national school is a primary school.

== History ==
National schools, established by the United Kingdom of Great Britain and Ireland government, post the Stanley Letter of 1831, and were intended to be multi-denominational. The schools were controlled by a state body, the National Board of Education, with a six-member board consisting of two Roman Catholics, two Church of Ireland, and two Presbyterians.

In the national schools, there was to be strict delimitation between religious and non-religious education, where the teacher had to declare that religious education was beginning, hang a sign on the wall or door indicating that religious education was in process, and remove all religious symbols and objects from sight when religious education finished. Also, parents had the a notional right to remove their children from this period of religious education if it conflicted with their religious beliefs. Lastly, schools who failed to abide by these rules or who refused admissions of different faiths to the patron were denied state funding. These rules largely remain in place today, but are not consistently recognised by the state, the patron bodies, or the general public.

In the early 19th century, in a climate of animosity between the churches, the multi-denominational system was strongly opposed: the established church (Church of Ireland), though the church of the minority, held a special position and a right to government support in promoting Anglicanism. Both the Roman Catholic Church, which was emerging from a period of suppression in Ireland, and the Protestant Presbyterians, who had also suffered under the penal laws, had sought state support for schools of their own tradition.

For example, James Doyle, the Roman Catholic Bishop of Kildare and Leighlin, was an early proponent, seeking to improve on the informal hedge school system. Doyle spoke before a Parliamentary Committee:

I do not see how any man wishing well to the public peace, and who looks to Ireland as his country, can think that peace can be permanently established, or the prosperity of the country ever well secured, if children are separated at the commencement of life on account of their religious opinions.

From a political point of view, Doyle believed that separate schools would endanger the public peace, which was not yet permanent. He dealt with the effect of separation on the children themselves by saying:

I do not know of any measures that would prepare the way for better feeling in Ireland than uniting children at an early age, and bringing them up in the same school, leading them to commune with one another and to form those little intimacies and friendships which subsist through life. Children thus united know and love each other as children brought up together always will and to separate them is I think, to destroy some of the finest feelings in the hearts of men.

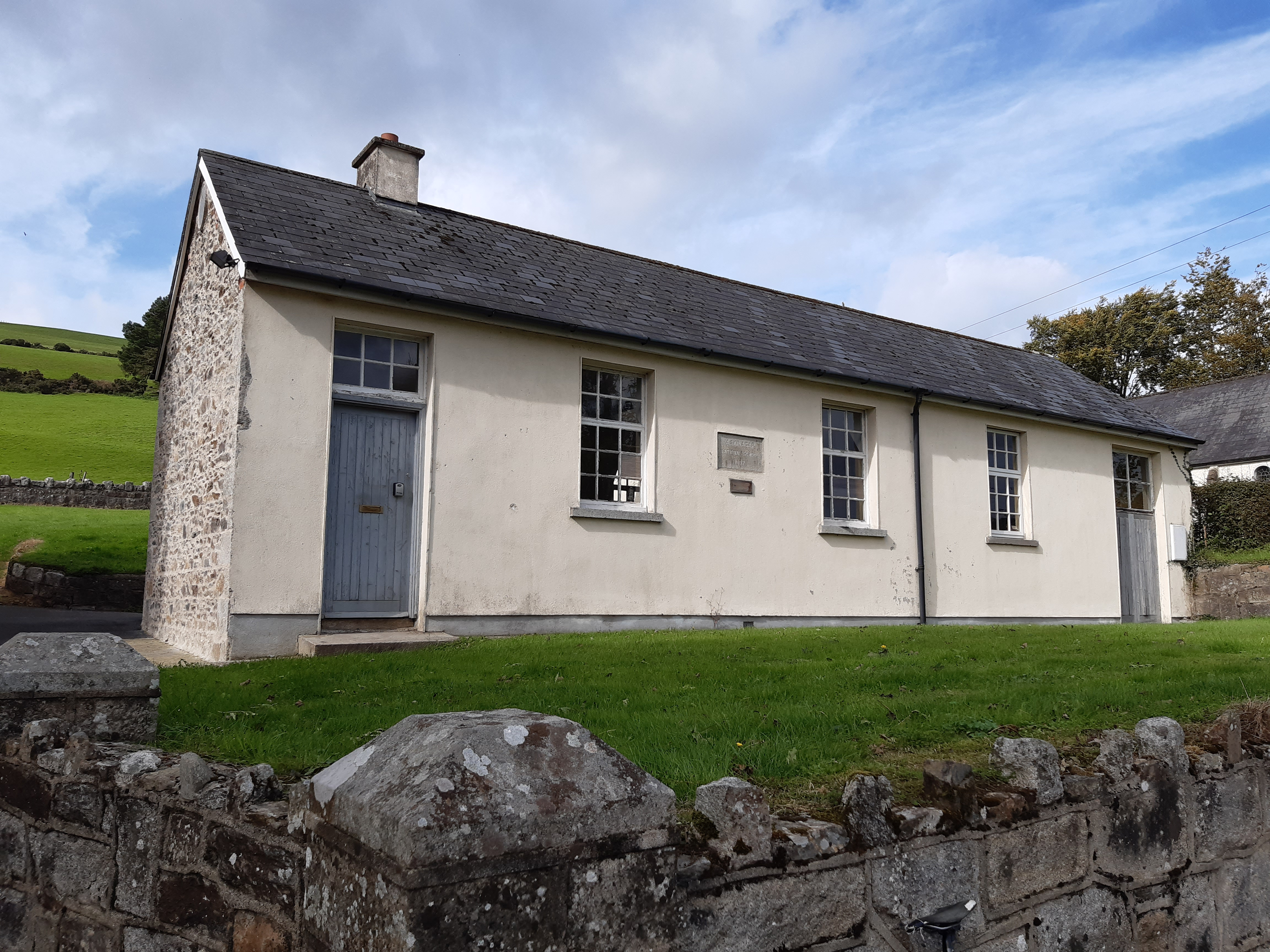
A former national school (est. 1897) in Askanagap, County Wicklow (now in use as the local community hall)

In 1831, Edward Stanley (who later became the 14th Earl of Derby), Chief Secretary for Ireland, in the Stanley letter to Augustus FitzGerald, 3rd Duke of Leinster, outlined the new state-supported system of primary education (this letter remains today the legal basis of the system). The two legal pillars of the national school system were to be (i) children of all religious denominations to be taught together in the same school, with (ii) separate religious instruction. There was to be no hint of proselytism in this new school system. The new system, initially well supported by the religious denominations, quickly lost support of the Churches. However, the population showed great enthusiasm and flocked to attend these new national schools. One of the civil servants managing implementation was Belfast-born Sir Alexander Macdonnell, 1st Baronet.

In the second half of the 19th century, first the Catholic Church, and later the Protestant churches conceded to the state, and accepted the "all religious denominations together" legal position. Where possible, parents sent their children of a national school under the local management of their particular Church. The result was that by the end of the 19th century the system had become increasingly denominational, with individuals choosing to attend schools primarily catering to children of their own religion. However, the legal position de jure, that all national schools are multi-denominational, remains to this day. Although, since the establishment of the Free State, consistent pressure has been exerted by the Catholic Church to drop the multi-denominational legal position, this has never been conceded by the state. A report was submitted to government in 1953 showing more than 90% of the schools were attended by only one denomination – that most national schools were de facto denominational. From 1965, changes in the 'Rules for National Schools' allowed for the integration of religious education into the curriculum. Today, following many years of immigration, a majority of national schools cater for more than one religion; today national schools are both de jure and de facto multi-denominational.

== Terminology ==
While there is no prescribed naming scheme for national schools, initials (within the name) are sometimes used to describe the type of school it is. For example, 'GNS' (as an abbreviation for Girls' National School) may denote a girl-only single gender school. Similarly, 'BNS' is used as an abbreviation for Boys' National School. 'SN', an abbreviation for the Irish language term Scoil Naisiúnta may sometimes appear before the name of the school (rather than after it).

While national-school teachers would sometimes historically use the post-nominal letters 'N.T.', this is no longer common.

== Gallery ==
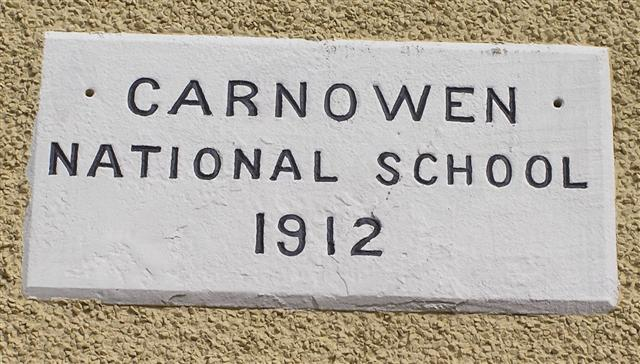
Plaque at Carnowen National School, near Raphoe in the east of County Donegal in Ulster.

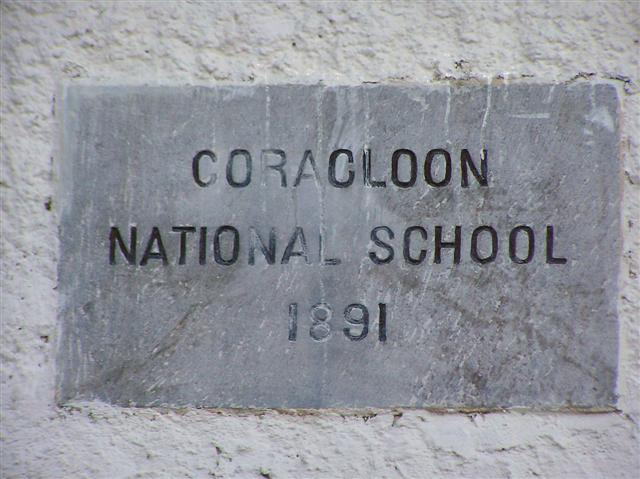
Plaque at Coracloon National School, County Leitrim.

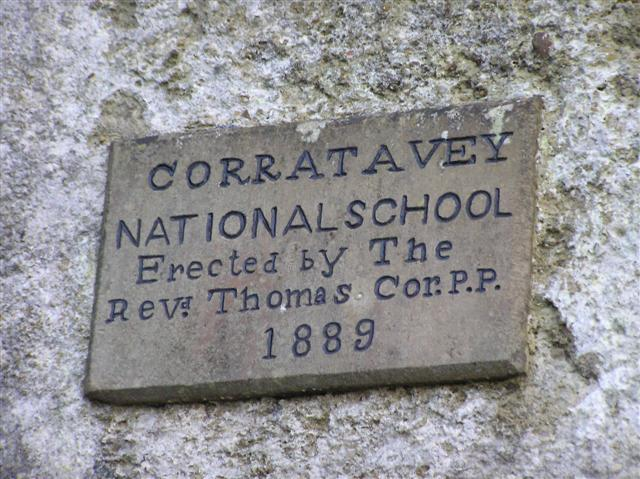
Plaque at Curratavey National School, County Cavan.

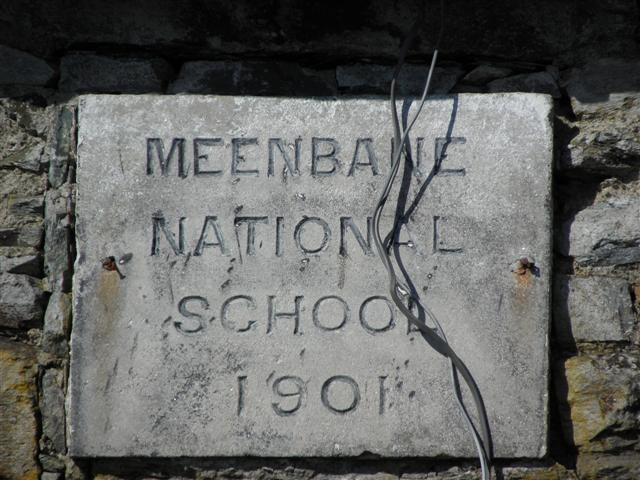
Plaque at Meenbane National School, near Ballybofey in the east of County Donegal in Ulster.

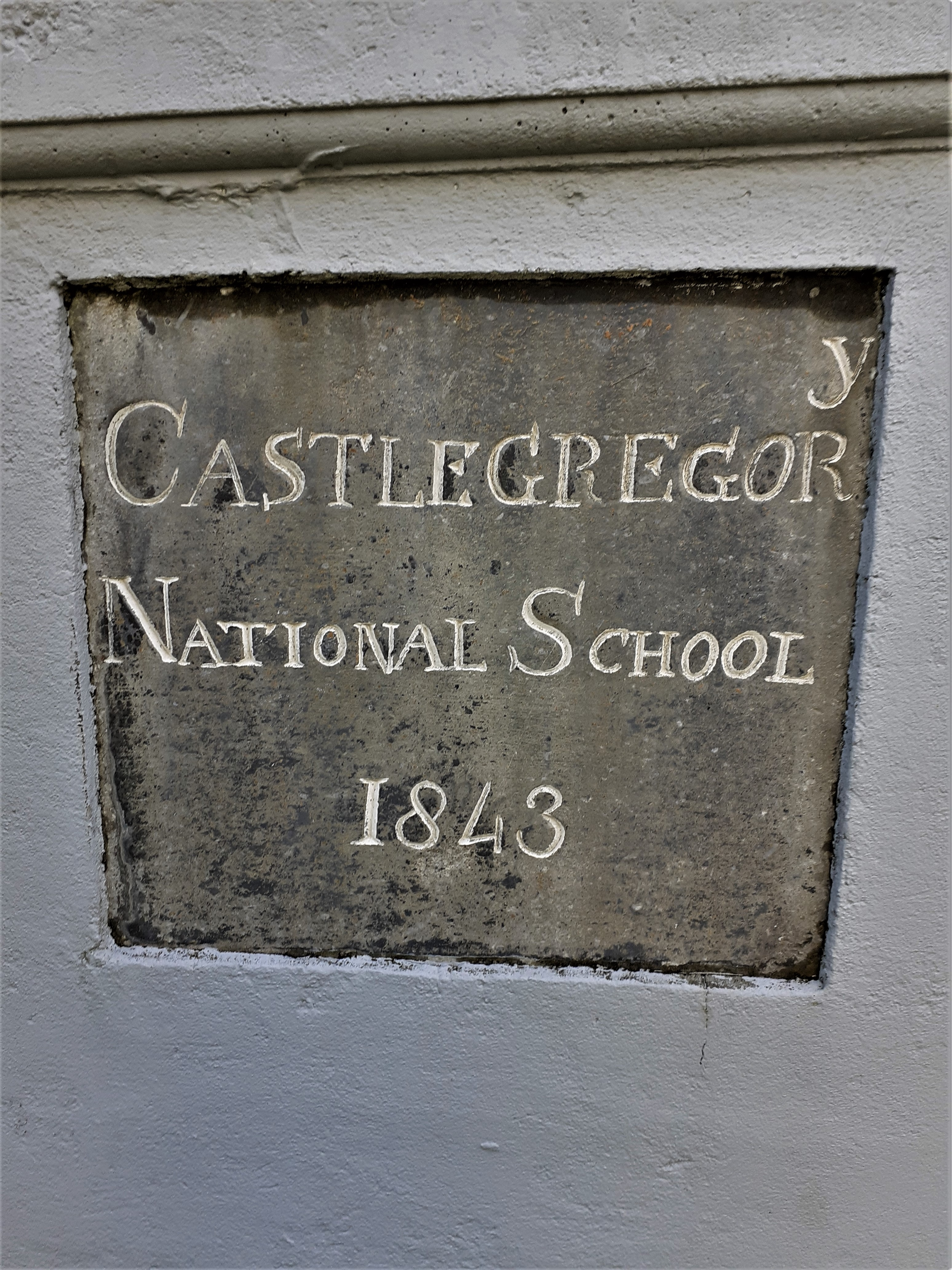
Plaque at Castlegregory National School, County Kerry; dated 1843, it is among the earliest National Schools.

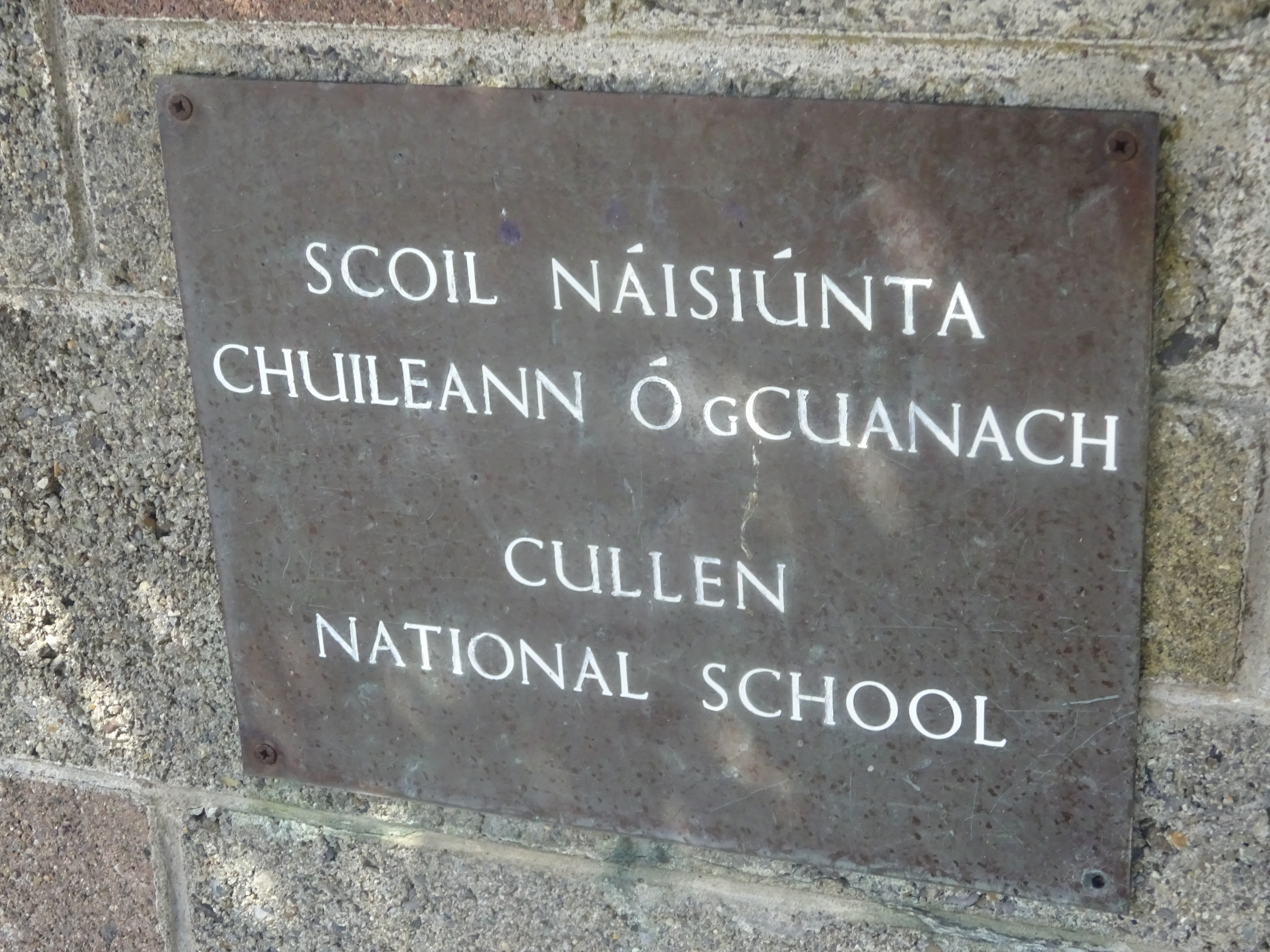
Plaque at Cullen National School, County Tipperary.

== See also ==
- Educate Together
- Gaelscoileanna, (primary schools which teach through the Irish language) cater for 6.4% of the schooling population in the Republic of Ireland and 0.4% of the schooling population in Northern Ireland.
- Education in Northern Ireland
