= Alexander Macdonell =

Alexander Macdonell may refer to:

- Alexander Macdonell of Greenfield (1782–1835), politician in Upper Canada
- Alexander Macdonell (bishop of Kingston) (1762–1840), first Bishop of Kingston, Ontario
- Alexander Macdonell (bishop of Alexandria-Cornwall), bishop of the Roman Catholic Diocese of Alexandria-Cornwall, 1890–1905
- Alexander Macdonell (politician) (1762–1842), elected representative for Glengarry County, Ontario and soldier in the War of 1812
- Alexander Ranaldson Macdonell (1773–1828), Scottish clansman
- Alexander McDonell (politician) (1786–1861), politician for Northumberland County, Ontario

== See also ==
- Alexander McDonnell (disambiguation)
- Alexander MacDonnell (disambiguation)
