= Mary McGivney =

Nursing leader in Ireland (1865–1933)

Mary McGivney RRC
- Born: 1865; Collon, County Louth, Ireland
- Died: 1933 (aged 67–68); Ardee, County Louth, Ireland
- Education: The London Hospital
- Occupations: Matron, College of Nursing founding member

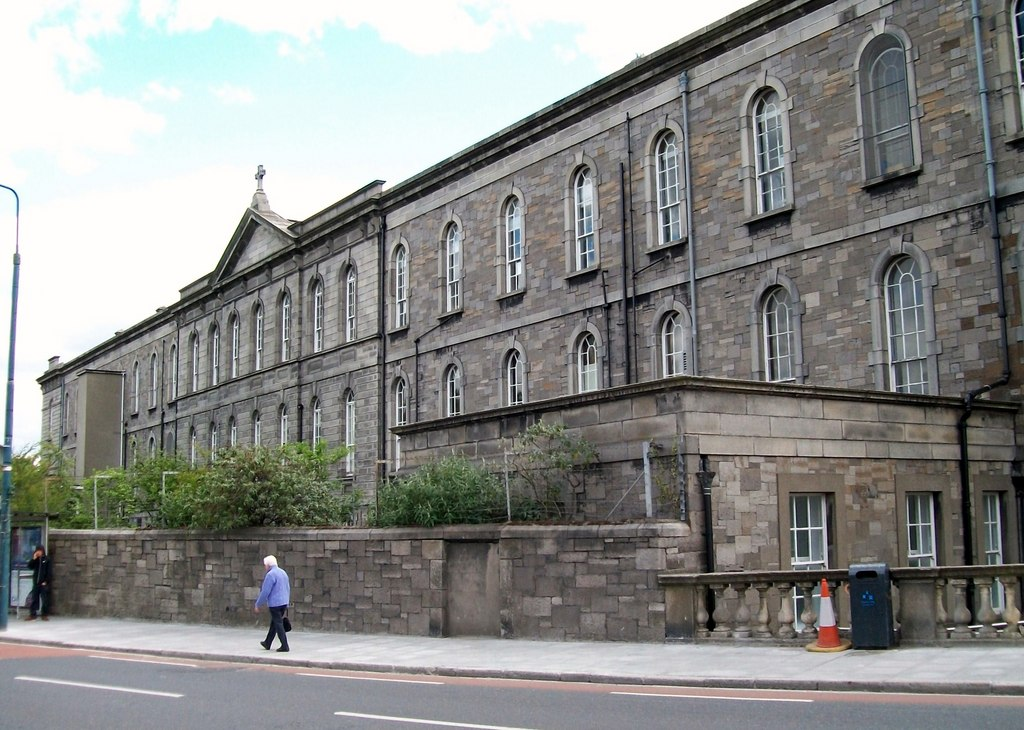
Mater Misericordiae Hospital, Dublin

Mary McGivney (1865–1933) Royal Red Cross, was an influential nurse reformer and Matron of the Mater Misericordiae Hospital, Dublin from 1892 to 1920, a founding member of the College of Nursing and a member of the Irish Board of the College. She also helped form a professional club for nurses in Dublin.

== Early life ==
McGivney was born on 6 February 1865 in Collon, County Louth, Ireland to her father Luke, and mother Anne. By 1911 her father had died and her mother was farming.

== Nursing career ==
McGiveney lived at home with her family until she commenced nurse training on 9 June 1888. She trained at The London Hospital, Whitechapel, London under Eva Luckes between 1888 and 1889. After sixteen months she developed a 'severe form of flat foot' and left before she had completed two years training on 16 October 1889. In 1892 she was appointed as matron of Mater Misericordiae Hospital, Dublin, Ireland, and held the post until 1920. During her matronship she oversaw the expansion of the nurse training programme at the hospital. In 1900 she helped found a professional club for nurses in Dublin along with Margaret Huxley. She was an early / founding member of the College of Nursing (later RCN), and was a member of the Irish Board of the College of Nursing.

== Retirement ==
McGivney retired in 1920, and died in Ardee, County Louth, Ireland in 1932.

== Honours ==
- Royal Red Cross, 1917
