= Alexander McDonnell =

Alexander McDonnell may refer to:

- Alexander McDonnell (chess player) (1798–1835), Irish chess master
- Alexander McDonnell (engineer) (1829–1904), locomotive engineer of the Great Southern & Western Railway (Ireland), & North Eastern Railway (England)
- Alexander MacDonnell, 3rd Earl of Antrim (1615–1699), Roman Catholic peer and military commander in Ireland
- Alexander McDonnell, 9th Earl of Antrim (1935–2021)

== See also ==
- Alexander McDonell (disambiguation)
- Alexander MacDonnell (disambiguation)
