= Richard Carmichael (physician) =

Irish surgeon and philanthropist (1779–1849)

Richard Carmichael MRCSI MRIA (February 1779 – 8 June 1849) was an Irish surgeon, medical writer and philanthropist.

== Life ==
Richard Carmichael was born in Bishop Street, Dublin, the son of Hugh Carmichael, a solicitor, and Sarah Rogers from County Meath. He studied medicine at the nearby Royal College of Surgeons in Ireland.

At the age of sixteen, after two years of study at the Royal College of Surgeons in Ireland, Carmichael was appointed assistant surgeon and ensign to the Wexford Militia. In 1803, he was elected Surgeon to St. George's Hospital and Dispensary—an institution in which he began his study of cancer. On the 23rd of August, 1803, he was appointed a Surgeon to the House of Industry Hospitals—institutions which he raised greatly in public estimation by his teaching, and to which his admirable cliniques attracted large classes. In 1810 his appointment as a Surgeon to the Lock Hospital gave him ample opportunities to observe that disease with the history of the diagnosis and treatment of which Carmichael's name will be for ever associated. For many years his practice was large and lucrative.

He was elected President of the Royal College of Surgeons in Ireland (RCSI) in 1813, 1826 and 1845. He was the first Irishman to receive the honour of being elected a corresponding member of the Royal Academy of Medicine in France. His bequest to RCSI instituted the Carmichael Prize Essay, awarded on themes of medical education. In 1816 he was appointed to the Richmond Hospital, Dublin, where he taught with Robert Adams, John Cheyne and Ephraim MacDowel. In 1826 they founded, at their own expense, the "School of Anatomy, Medicine and Surgery of the Richmond Hospital". This was renamed the Carmichael School of Medicine after his death, and to which he bequeathed £10,000.

He founded the Irish Medical Association in 1840. Carmichael was an ardent medical reformer, and for ten years presided over the Medical Association of Ireland, the objects of which were the protection of the interests of the profession, and the reformation of the methods of educating and examining its members. Carmichael desired to see a separation of the prescribing from the compounding of medicines, and he advocated the complete education of the student, so as to qualify him to practise in any department of the healing art. Carmichael contributed £500 to the funds of this Association; but the money not being required, was ultimately, at Carmichael's desire, transferred to the Medical Benevolent Association. This institution had always in him an active advocate and a liberal benefactor, and his last public act was to preside at one of its annual meetings. In his will this excellent Society was not

forgotten, £4,500 being bequeathed to it.

He drowned while riding his horse across the sands to his summer residence in Sutton, near Dublin, and was buried in St. George's Churchyard, Whitworth Road. The foundation stone for the new school of medicine named the Carmichael School of Medicine was laid on 29 March 1864 in North Brunswick St. The building was next to the North Dublin Union and cost £6,000. The architect was James Edward Rogers of Dublin.

== References and sources ==
Notes

Sources

- Fleetwood, John F (1983). The History of Medicine in Ireland. Dublin: Skellig Press.
- Cameron, Charles Alexander (1886). History of the Royal College of Surgeons in Ireland, and of the Irish schools of medicine : including a medical bibliography and a medical biography. Dublin: Fannin.
- Dictionary of Irish Biography, Royal Irish Academy, Richard Carmichael
