= Robert Adams (physician) =

Irish surgeon and academic, President of the RCSI

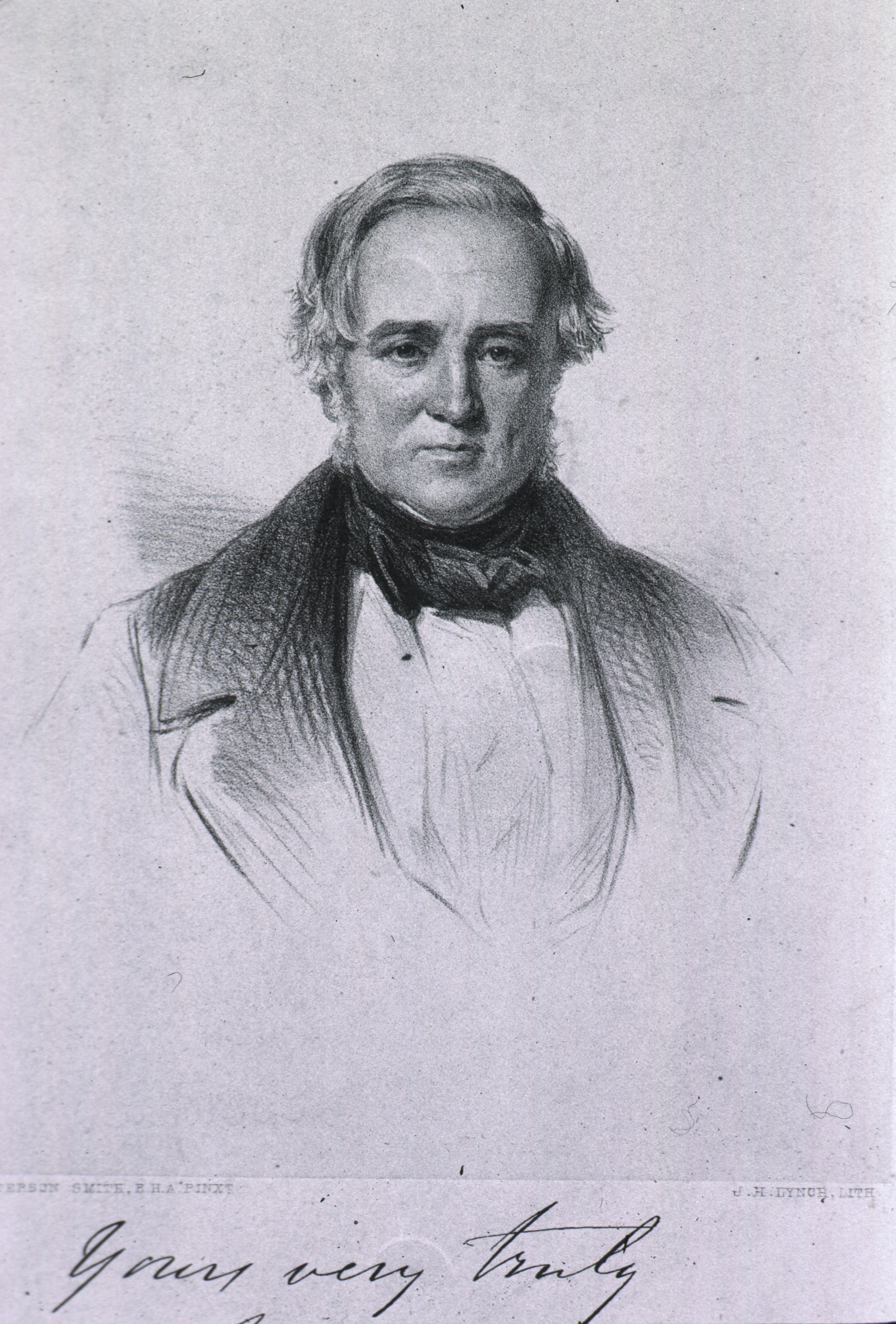
- Born: 1791; Dublin, Ireland
- Died: 13 January 1875

Robert Adams (1791 – 13 January 1875) was an Irish surgeon and was three times President of the Royal College of Surgeons in Ireland (RCSI), in 1840, 1860 and 1867.

== Early life and education ==
Adams was born in 1791 in Dublin, Ireland and studied at Trinity College Dublin between 1810 and 1814. He received his B.A. in 1814. He began his medical training under William Hartigan and George Stewart, leading Dublin surgeons. He was elected a fellow of the RCSI in 1818 and then went abroad to complete his medical and surgical training. Adams did not take the M.B. degree until 1842. In that year he became an M.D., and in 1861 received the newly instituted qualification of Master in Surgery.

The greater part of Adams' anatomical studies were undertaken in the RCSI under Abraham Colles. In 1816, he obtained the Letters Testimonial, and on 2 November 1818, he was promoted to Membership of the College. He was elected surgeon to the Jervis Street Hospital and the Richmond Hospital. He took part in founding the Richmond Hospital Medical School, later Carmichael School of Medicine and taught there for many years.

== Career ==
Adams later became three times president of the RCSI and the Dublin Pathological Society, and, in 1862, both Surgeon in Ordinary to the Queen in Ireland, and Regius Professor of Surgery at Trinity College Dublin. His work focussed on cardiac, respiratory, vascular and joint diseases, and emphasised postmortem examination. His fame chiefly rests on his ‘Treatise on Rheumatic Gout, or Chronic Rheumatic Arthritis of all the Joints’ (8vo, London, 1857, with an Atlas of Illustrations in 4to; 2nd edition, 1873). This work, though describing a disease more or less known for centuries, contains so much novel and important research as to have become the classical work on the subject. He published a number of important medical texts, including Diseases of the Heart, but it was his work on gout, from which he suffered himself, that made him famous. Stokes–Adams disease is named after himself and William Stokes.

== Death ==
Adams died 13 January 1875 and was buried in Mount Jerome Cemetery, Dublin.

== Selected publications ==
- Chronic Rheumatic Arthritis of the Shoulder-Joint (1849)
- A Treatise on Rheumatic Gout, or Chronic Rheumatic Arthritis of All the Joints (1857)
