= Stanley letter =

The Stanley letter is a letter written in 1831 by Edward Stanley (who later became the 14th Earl of Derby), then Chief Secretary for Ireland. The letter outlined his proposal which helped the UK government to establish the legal basis for national schools in Ireland. It was written two years after the government led by the Duke of Wellington, in alliance with Daniel O'Connell, secured the passage and Royal Proclamation of the Catholic Emancipation bill. It was penned by the Chief Secretary for Ireland, Edward Stanley (later Prime Minister of the United Kingdom as the 14th Earl of Derby) and was addressed to the 3rd Duke of Leinster.

The letter also contributed to the establishment of state education in Australia, where its model was supported by the statesman and education advocate William Wentworth.

== Proposal ==
The proposal in the Stanley letter was considered a policy experiment. As one commentator put it, "Ireland, as a colony could be used as an experimental milieu for social legislation which might not be tolerated in England where laissez-faire politico-economic policies were more rigid and doctrinaire." This was also true of other Irish initiatives involving the police force and health services. Stanley's framework involved the establishment of "a board for the superintendence of a system of national education" integrating key measures and educational conventions in place in Ireland such as the state-supported, mass system foundered on the denominational issue.

== Results ==
In line with the letter's suggestions, a Board of Commission of National Education was established which disbursed funds for school building and the hiring of teachers and inspectors and which provided grants for schools. The Board tried to mix Catholic and Protestant students by favouring applications for 'mixed' schools. However, in the years after the 1830s, different religious denominations begin to apply separately for control of schools.

The new policy was credited for spreading literacy, especially to the poor communities. By 1831, the national schools based on Stanley's model has enrolled more than 100,000 children, a figure that increased to almost 1 million within 40 years. Teacher training was also enhanced. For example, the paid monitors, the lowest grade teachers, were evaluated annually using the instructional materials used in schools.

== Current status ==
The Stanley letter remains today the legal basis for all national schools in the Republic of Ireland, the predominant form of primary education in the country.

=== Australia ===
The system outlined in the Stanley letter was used as a model in the creation of state primary education in the Australian colony of New South Wales. William Wentworth, a strong supporter of universal and secular education, proposed the introduction of "Lord Stanley's system of national education" with modification so that:

...instead of the clergy and pastors of the several denominations being allowed to impart religious instruction in the schools, the children be allowed to be absent from school one day in every week exclusive of Sunday, for the purpose of receiving such instruction elsewhere...

The proposed amendment was passed by the Legislative Council and the Board of National Education was established shortly after.
