= Philipp Bozzini =

German physician (1773–1809)

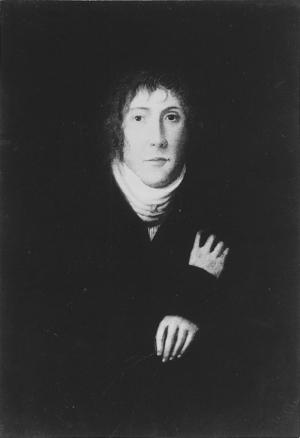
Philipp Bozzini, a self-portrait

Philipp Bozzini (May 25, 1773 – April 4, 1809) was born in Mainz, Germany. On June 12, 1797, he was awarded the degree of doctor of medicine. From 1804 onwards, Bozzini devoted himself virtually completely to develop his instrument, Lichtleiter or "Light Conductor", a primitive endoscope to allow for inspecting the ear, urethra, rectum, female bladder, cervix, mouth, nasal cavity, or wounds. Philipp Bozzini, using the modest means available at the beginning of the 19th century, was able to show to the medical profession the way to endoscopy. With his instrument and ideas, he was three quarters of a century ahead of the technical and scientific possibilities of his time. Historians agree that this instrument using artificial light and various mirrors and specula was the beginning of a large family of endoscopes.

== Early life ==
Philipp Bozzini was born on May 25, 1773, in Mainz, Germany. His father, Nicolaus Maria Bozzini de Bozza, came from a well-to-do Italian family that had to escape from Italy in approximately 1760 as the result of a duel. In Mainz, Nicolaus entered into business and married Anna Maria Florentin de Cravatte, from the city of Frankfurt.

Bozzini started his medical studies in Mainz, and approximately in 1794 went to Jena to complete them. On June 12, 1797, Bozzini was granted the title of doctor of medicine, which allowed him to establish in Mainz as physician. Soon afterwards, he traveled several times to France and the Netherlands in order to acquire professional experience.

== Later life ==
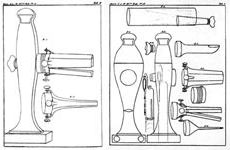
Drawings of Bozzini's Lichtleiter

In 1798 he married Margarete Reck, and they had three children.

During the War of the Second Coalition against France, Bozzini served in the imperial army and was in charge of a 120-bed campaign hospital in Mainz. His extraordinary merits during this time were known by the Archduke Karl of Austria (1771–1847), who would protect in the future Bozzini’s invention. Bozzini thought that the instrument could be incorporated into Austrian military hospitals. This required a device to be sent to Wien, and also the performance of an expertise by health authorities. An investigating committee subjected the instrument to various tests, starting with examination in corpses of the bladder, rectum, vagina, and peritoneal cavity through small laparotomies. The committee proposed some changes intended to improve the performance of the light conductor. Once such changes were made, they were satisfied with the operation of the instrument in patients (only examinations of the peritoneal cavity were not approved), particularly also because the procedure was painless.

Due to intrigues in the upper governmental spheres, a second expertise was decided, this time at the Wien medical school, which performed it, and partly under the negative influence of the church, as the report turned out to be unfavorable for Bozzini and concluded that such an instrument should not be used.

The second coalition war ended with the 1801 Luneville peace treaty between Napoleon and Kaiser Franz, and the left bank of the Rhine river remained in the hands of the French. The new Mainz government granted young Bozzini authorization to practice his profession, but he refused to accept the French citizenship and therefore decided to establish himself at Frankfurt.

== Activities in Frankfurt ==
Bozzini’s knowledge of mathematics, philosophy, and chemistry was outstanding. Aeronautic studies and drawings of a flying device were unfortunately lost. His exceptional talent as an artist and drawer is shown by his monograph about the “light conductor”, where a self-portrait and watercolor paintings about the instrument may be seen.

Like many idealist people, Bozzini had no experience in business matters, but devoted himself with enthusiasm to his scientific activities. From 1804 on, his dedication to the development of his instrument for endoscopy was virtually complete. To earn a living, Bozzini practiced obstetrics with extreme care. On May 30, 1808, he was granted the title of “Physicus extraordinarius” at the request of one of his patients, Karl Theodor von Dalberg, a personality of great influence in the region.

Bozzini was one of the four physicians of the city of Frankfurt who should also care for the surrounding peasant areas while being a “plague” physician.

== Death ==
The various tasks in Frankfurt were not only tedious for these physicians, but also dangerous. His predecessor in the position, Dr. Zeitmann, had died during one of the epidemic outbreaks of typhus in the region. Bozzini contracted the same disease around mid-March 1809, after successfully treating 42 patients with typhus. His friend and colleague Feyerlein subsequently reported the dedication with which he cared of his patients, disregarding the risk of contagion he had. On April 4, 1809, Bozzini died from that infection at 36 years of age.

He left his wife in a bad financial situation. She died six months later. Their three small children were given over to friends.

== Legacy ==
When the Frankfurt Cathedral was renovated after the war, in 1954, the gravestone to the memory of Bozzini was uncovered; the words dedicated to him by his friend Feyerlein may still be read in it:

“To the devote soul of Philipp Bozzini, doctor of medicine, who was the first to explore the inside of organs through his ingenious light projector. He was able to tenaciously fight fever in other people, with a great sense of duty, and succumbed on the night from the 4th to the 5th day of April 1809, in his 36th year of life. His faithful friend F.F."

== See also ==
Antonin Jean Desormeaux
