= Francis Cruise =

Irish surgeon and urologist

Francis Xavier Richard Cruise (3 December 1834 – 26 February 1912) was a 19th-century Irish surgeon and urologist best known for inventing an endoscope and using it successfully in surgery in 1865.

== Life and work ==
Cruise was born in Dublin and baptised 7 December 1834 at the Pro-Cathedral. His father was Dublin solicitor Francis Cruise (1795 – before 1859) and his mother was Eleanor Mary Brittain (1795–1877) from Cheshire in England. He was an uncle of Edward Cuthbert Butler. He attended both Belvedere College, where he was the first president of the Belvedere Union, and Clongowes Wood. His university education was at Trinity College Dublin (BA 1856, MD 1861).

His medical career saw him work at the Mater Hospital and teach at the Carmichael School of Medicine, as well as research and publish on genital irregularities, bladder diseases and dislocations. He was lauded for successfully performing some of the world's first endoscopic treatments, including early endoscopically-assisted urethrotomies using his own endoscope modified from one developed in the 1850s by Antonin Desormeaux. From 1884 to 1886 he served as the President of the Royal College of Physicians of Ireland. In 1906, he was knighted by the British government.

He also wrote about Thomas à Kempis and translated his On the Imitation of Christ, and in 1905, Pope Pius X made him a Knight of St Gregory the Great. He had married Mary Frances Power (1839–1910) of Dublin in 1859, the union resulting in six sons and three daughters. He was an accomplished cello player and editor of classical and traditional Irish music, and also served as Governor of the Royal Irish Academy of Music.

He died at his home in Dublin on 26 February 1912.
