= Nephroscopy =

Medical procedure

- ICD-9-CM: 55.21

A nephroscopy is an endoscopic examination of the kidney. During the operation the surgeon passes a thin telescope (the nephroscope) into the kidney's drainage tubes through a key-hole puncture in the skin, letting them see, break up and take out stones that are blocking urine.

== History ==
The first reported attempt at percutaneous renal access was made by the London physician Thomas Hillier in 1865, when he repeatedly drained a hydronephrotic kidney in a child through the loin, hoping to create a permanent fistula; the concept did not gain acceptance at the time. Modern practice dates from 1941, when Rupel and Brown slid a rigid cystoscope through a surgically made tunnel into the kidney and took out a stone while watching it directly. In 1955 the radiologist Willard Goodwin performed the first radiologically guided antegrade nephrostogram and left a drainage tube in situ, establishing the principle of the percutaneous nephrostomy. The first true percutaneous nephrolithotomy (PCNL)—extraction of a renal pelvic stone through a percutaneous tract under fluoroscopic control—was described by Fernström and Johansson in 1976, with further refinements by Alken, Marberger, Wickham and others during the late 1970s and early 1980s; in 1978 Arthur Smith coined the term endourology for these closed, image-guided interventions. Subsequent innovations such as telescopic tract dilators and the wide-bore Amplatz sheath reduced bleeding and improved visibility, establishing PCNL and nephroscopy as the standard minimally invasive approach for large or complex renal stones.

== Techniques and indications ==
The European Association of Urology considers percutaneous nephroscopy, performed as part of PCNL, the first-line option for renal stones larger than 2 cm (0.8 in) and for complex staghorn calculi that are unlikely to clear with shock-wave lithotripsy or ureteroscopy.

Surgeons usually keep the access tunnel open with a 24–30 F Amplatz sheath, but many units now prefer "mini-PCNL" tunnels (smaller than 18 F). The narrower track removes less kidney tissue and lowers bleeding, so recovery is quicker, though the operation can take a little longer. The smaller tract removes less kidney tissue and can shorten recovery, although the operation may take a little longer because the narrower channel limits the size of instruments and stone fragments that can be removed at one time.

Modern scopes carry a tiny CMOS camera and two LED light cords at their tip, giving high-definition pictures. Most designs (including mini-PCNL versions) also have a wide channel that provides continuous wash-in and suction, big enough to pass laser or ultrasound probes. This lets the surgeon see, break up and remove the stone through one instrument.

Emerging adjuncts such as 3-D printed renal models, augmented reality puncture guidance and preliminary AI algorithms aim to lower vascular injury and reduce fluoroscopy exposure.

Whatever equipment is used, the operation has three main stages. First, the surgeon punctures a kidney calyx under X-ray or ultrasound guidance. Next, they widen the track step by step and insert an Amplatz sheath to hold it open. Finally, they inspect the kidney, remove or powder the stone pieces, and—if bleeding control or drainage needs it—leave a nephrostomy tube or stent.

== Complications ==
A systematic review of nearly 12,000 PCNL cases reported postoperative fever in 10.8% of patients, blood transfusion in 7% and procedure-related mortality of 0.05%. Bleeding, infection and other problems are likelier if several access tracks are used, if the drainage system is torn, or if the patient already has anaemia before surgery.

== Post-operative care ==
Using several types of pain relief, choosing smaller tubes—or sometimes no tube at all—can cut hospital stay and reduce opioid use after PCNL.
