= Robert McDonnell (surgeon) =

Irish surgeon (1828–1889)

Robert McDonnell, FRS (15 March 1828 – 6 May 1889) was an Irish surgeon.

== Life ==
Born in Dublin 15 March 1828, he was the second son of Dr. John McDonnell, from a Hebridean background. He was educated privately and entered Trinity College, Dublin, in 1844. In the following year, he was apprenticed to Richard Carmichael, and on Carmichael's death by drowning in 1849, he was transferred to Robert Moore Peile. He graduated B.A. and M.B. in 1850, obtained the Royal College of Surgeons license in Ireland on 22 February 1851, and was admitted a fellow on 24 August 1853. He then visited Edinburgh, Paris, and Vienna.

In 1855, he was attached to the British Hospital at Smyrna during the Crimean War. He volunteered as a civil surgeon to serve in the general hospital in the camp before Sebastopol, where he remained until the end of the siege. He received the British medal and clasp for his services and the Turkish medal. In 1856 he was appointed demonstrator of anatomy in the Carmichael School of Medicine, where he later became a lecturer on anatomy and physiology. In 1857 he pursued an M.D. at the Trinity College, Dublin, and in 1864 he was admitted to the degree of M.D. in the Queen's University in Ireland. He was appointed a surgeon to Jervis Street Hospital in Dublin in 1863, and three years later, he was elected surgeon to Dr. Steevens' Hospital, and professor of descriptive anatomy in its medical school attached to it.

In 1857 McDonnell was appointed medical superintendent of Mountjoy Prison. In the discharge of his official duties, he clashed with the prisons board on questions of the food supply and general treatment of the prisoners under his charge. McDonnell stoutly maintained that the medical officer should exercise full discretion in such matters. The board thought otherwise, and he resigned his post in 1867. Some demur made to granting him a pension, but in the interests of his profession, he fought out the battle and eventually obtained the pension. The money he contributed to the Royal Medical Benevolent Fund Society.

McDonnell was twice elected by the senate of Trinity College as a member of the university council. For some years, he was an examiner at the Royal College of Surgeons of Ireland, a body of which he was elected president in 1877. In 1885 he was elected president of the Academy of Medicine in Ireland, an honourable position he filled for three years. He belonged to the Royal Society, elected a fellow on 1 June 1865, and other English scientific societies. He died suddenly at his house in Merrion Square, Dublin, on Monday, 6 May 1889, supposedly of rupture of an aneurysm. He was twice married and left one son by his second wife.

== Works ==
McDonnell wrote no books, but authored many surgical and scientific papers. He edited a volume of the works of Abraham Colles for the New Sydenham Society in 1881.

== Notes ==
Attribution

This article incorporates text from a publication now in the public domain: Lee, Sidney, ed. (1893). "McDonnell, Robert". Dictionary of National Biography. Vol. 35. London: Smith, Elder & Co.
