= Macdonnell baronets =

Extinct baronetcy in the Baronetage of the United Kingdom

There have been two baronetcies created for persons with the surname Macdonnell, one in the Baronetage of Ireland and one in the Baronetage of the United Kingdom. Both creations are extinct.

The Macdonnell Baronetcy, of Maye in the County of Antrim, was created in the Baronetage of Ireland on 30 November 1627 for Alexander Macdonnell. The third Baronet was attainted in 1691 and the baronetcy forfeited.

The Macdonnell Baronetcy, of Kilsharvan in the County of Meath, was created in the Baronetage of the United Kingdom on 20 January 1872 for the Irish civil servant Alexander Macdonnell. The title became extinct on his death in 1875.

== Macdonnell baronets, of Maye (1627) ==
- Sir Alexander Macdonnell, 1st Baronet (died 1634)
- Sir James Macdonnell, 2nd Baronet (died c. 1680)
- Sir Randal Macdonnell, 3rd Baronet (died c. 1697)

== Macdonnell baronets, of Kilsharvan (1872) ==
- Sir Alexander Macdonnell, 1st Baronet (1794–1875)
