= Antonin Jean Desormeaux =

French physician and inventor

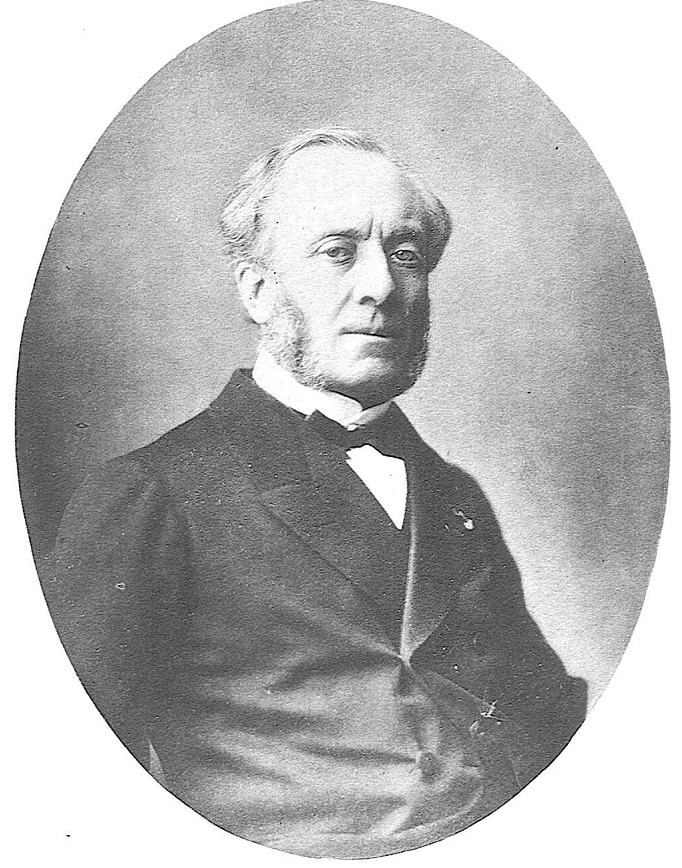
Antonin Jean Desormeaux

Antonin Jean Desormeaux (25 December 1815 – October 1894) was a 19th-century French physician and inventor who has been called the "father of endoscopy", because he made significant improvements to the early endoscope and was the first to successfully use it to operate on a living patient (his device would be called a cystoscope today). He presented his device to the French Academy of Sciences in Paris on July 20, 1853.

== Scientific Work ==
His work was based on that of earlier inventors like Philipp Bozzini, some of whom had previously used endoscopes for diagnostic purposes, however, Desormeaux's invention was the first to be usable for simple operations such as chemical cauterization. The main improvements in his device were the use of a gasogene lamp, which consisted of a burning mixture of alcohol and turpentine and provided superior illumination to previous technologies, and improvements in focusing the light coming from the endoscope. Further improvements to the endoscope were later made by Sir Francis Cruise.

His work was considered the state of the art until the invention of electric illumination once again revolutionized the field. He also wrote a textbook titled De l’endoscope which helped popularize the procedure.

== Life and career ==
Desormeaux was born in Paris in 1815. He received a doctoral degree in 1844. In 1862, he received the position of "chef de service" at the Parisian Hôpital Necker. He died at the age of 79 in 1894.
