= James Edward Rogers =

Irish artist, architect and book-illustrator

- Born: 1838
- Died: 1896 (aged 57–58)
- Occupations: Architect and illustrator

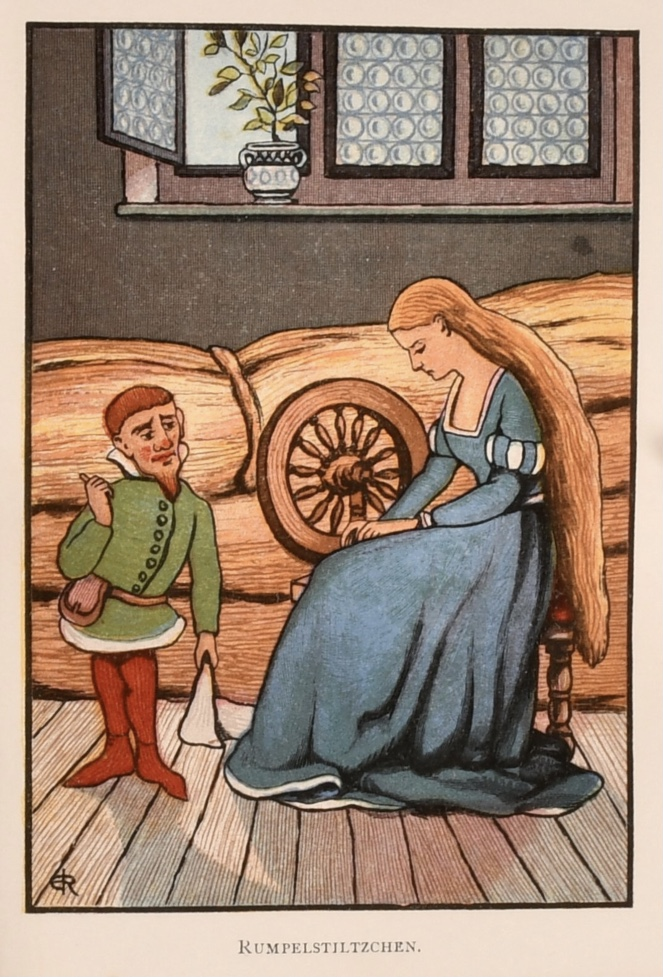
J. E. Rogers, Rumpelstiltzchen

James Edward Rogers (1838 – 18 February 1896) was an Irish artist, architect, and book-illustrator whose early career was in Dublin. In 1876 he moved to London, where he is believed to have worked only as an artist.

== Early life ==
Born in Dublin, Rogers was the son of James Rogers, a barrister and Queen's Counsel. His early education was there, then he attended the Royal Grammar School, Guildford, before joining Trinity College Dublin, where he matriculated on 2 July 1855, aged seventeen. He was taken as a pupil by Benjamin Woodward, a notable Irish architect who was suffering from tuberculosis. Woodward was in the process of designing the Oxford Museum and the debating hall of the Oxford Union, both of which Rogers visited.

Rogers struck up friendships with Dante Gabriel Rossetti and William Morris, while they were painting Arthurian murals at the Oxford Union, and according to William Tuckwell the three men went "hunting in the parish churches on Sunday evenings to find a Guinevere". They found Jane Burden, whom Morris later married.

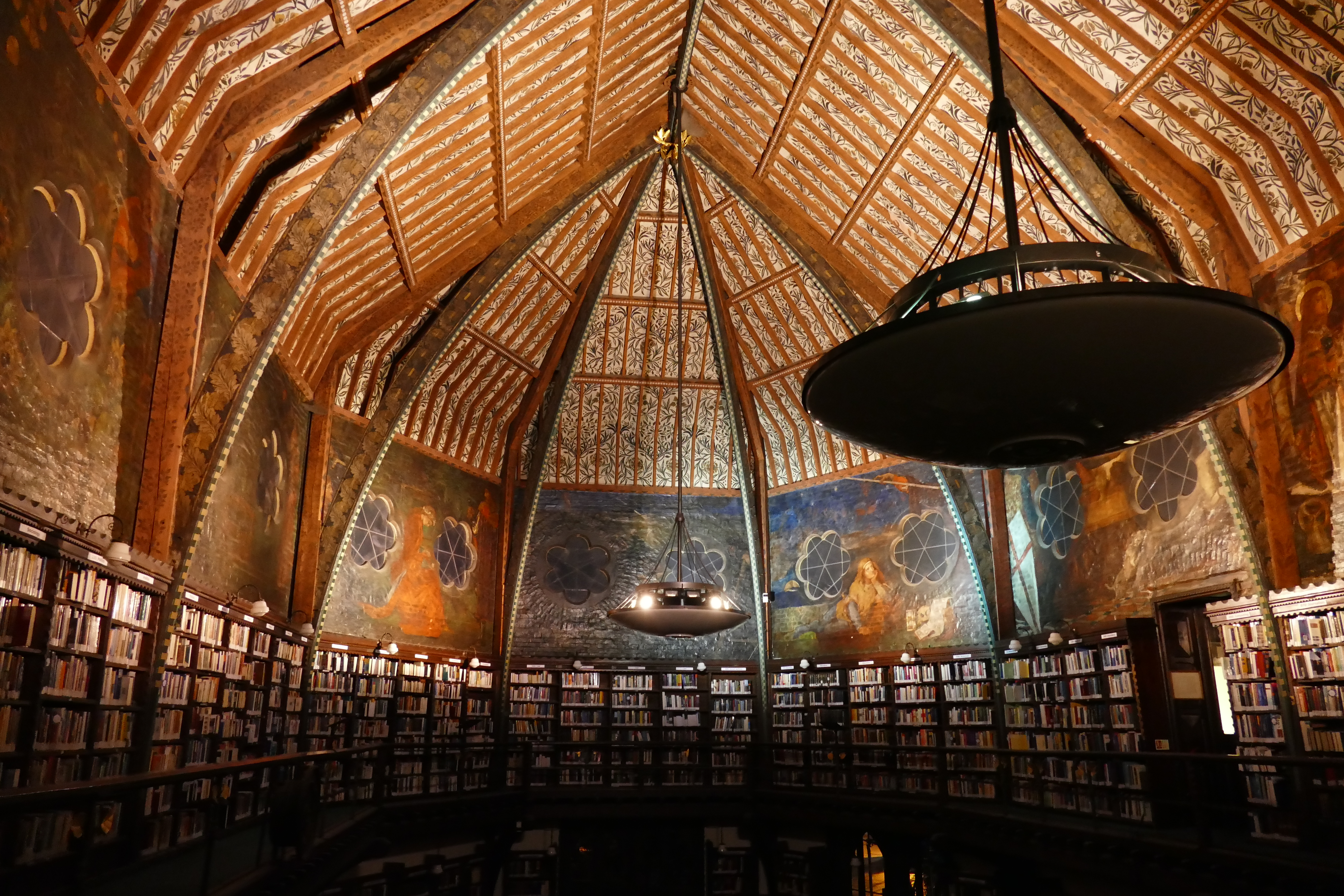
The Oxford Union murals

Rogers's lifelong friend J. P. Mahaffy described him as "Woodward's favourite pupil". Woodward overwintered in Madeira for the sake of his lungs, and in the spring of 1860 Rogers travelled to meet him, either in the South of France or Algiers. Woodward died in May 1861.

Rogers graduated BA from Trinity College in 1861 and in 1865 proceeded to MA.

== Career ==
By about 1862, Rogers had set up his own architectural practice in Dublin. In 1863 he appeared in Irish professional directories, working from 20 Upper Mount Street, his father's house. By 1864, his office was at 205, Great Brunswick Street (now called Pearse Street), and on 15 December 1864 he was elected a fellow of the Royal Institute of the Architects of Ireland, before joining its Council in 1868. From 1870 to 1876, he shared a building at 179, Great Brunswick Street, with James Franklin Fuller and William Stirling.

Early examples of Rogers's work as an architect are the Carmichael School of Medicine (1864) and the rectory of St Bartholomew's Church, Dublin. Most of his work was for the Church of Ireland. He designed and altered churches in the Diocese of Dublin and Glendalough and the western counties of Ireland and was formally the Diocese of Meath architect until 1869, when the Church of Ireland was disestablished by the Irish Church Act 1869.

While working as an architect, Rogers was also active as a landscape artist, drawing and painting watercolours. In 1861, some of his work appeared at the Exhibition of Fine and Ornamental Arts, Dublin, and from 1870 he showed pictures at the Royal Hibernian Academy. He was elected as an associate of the RHA on 4 December 1871. Many of his landscapes are of scenes in Germany and the Netherlands.

Macmillan published two illustrated books of nursery rhymes by Rogers, Ridicula Rediviva (1869) and Mores Ridiculi (1871) and also an edition of Dinah Craik's The Fairy Book in 1870. More of his colour lithographs were used in Present Pastimes of Merrie England (Cassell, Petter, & Galpin, 1873).

On 26 January 1874, Rogers was elected a fellow of the Royal Institute of British Architects, proposed by James Joseph McCarthy, Thomas Newenham Deane, and James Franklin Fuller.

In 1876, Rogers moved from Dublin to London, but he went on exhibiting work at the Royal Hibernian Academy until his death. While living in England, he probably did not practise as an architect at all, and in 1877 he resigned from the Royal Institute. He exhibited paintings at the Royal Academy from 1881, and in 1888 at the Irish Exhibition in London. In 1889, Rogers and his friend J. P. Mahaffy worked together on Sketches from a tour through Holland and Germany. The next work he illustrated was Troubadour-Land: A Ramble in Provence and Languedoc (1891) by Sabine Baring-Gould.

== Private life ==
In 1864, Rogers was living at Chapelizod, and in 1865 moved to Rathmines. From 1870 until 1875 he lived at Ballybrack.

In England, Rogers lived in Maida Vale, from 1876 to 1880; Portman Square, from 1881 to 1883; Hampstead, from 1884 to 1893; and finally in Regent's Park, from 1894 until his death in February 1896.

Rogers died at 35, Fitzroy Road, Primrose Hill. His executors were an unmarried sister, Miss Ethel Mary Rogers, and Frederick James Quick, a coffee merchant. He left an estate valued for probate at £12,227, equivalent to £1,752,213 in 2023.

The National Gallery of Ireland has one painting by Rogers, a street scene in Limburg, a small town in Hesse.

== Gallery ==
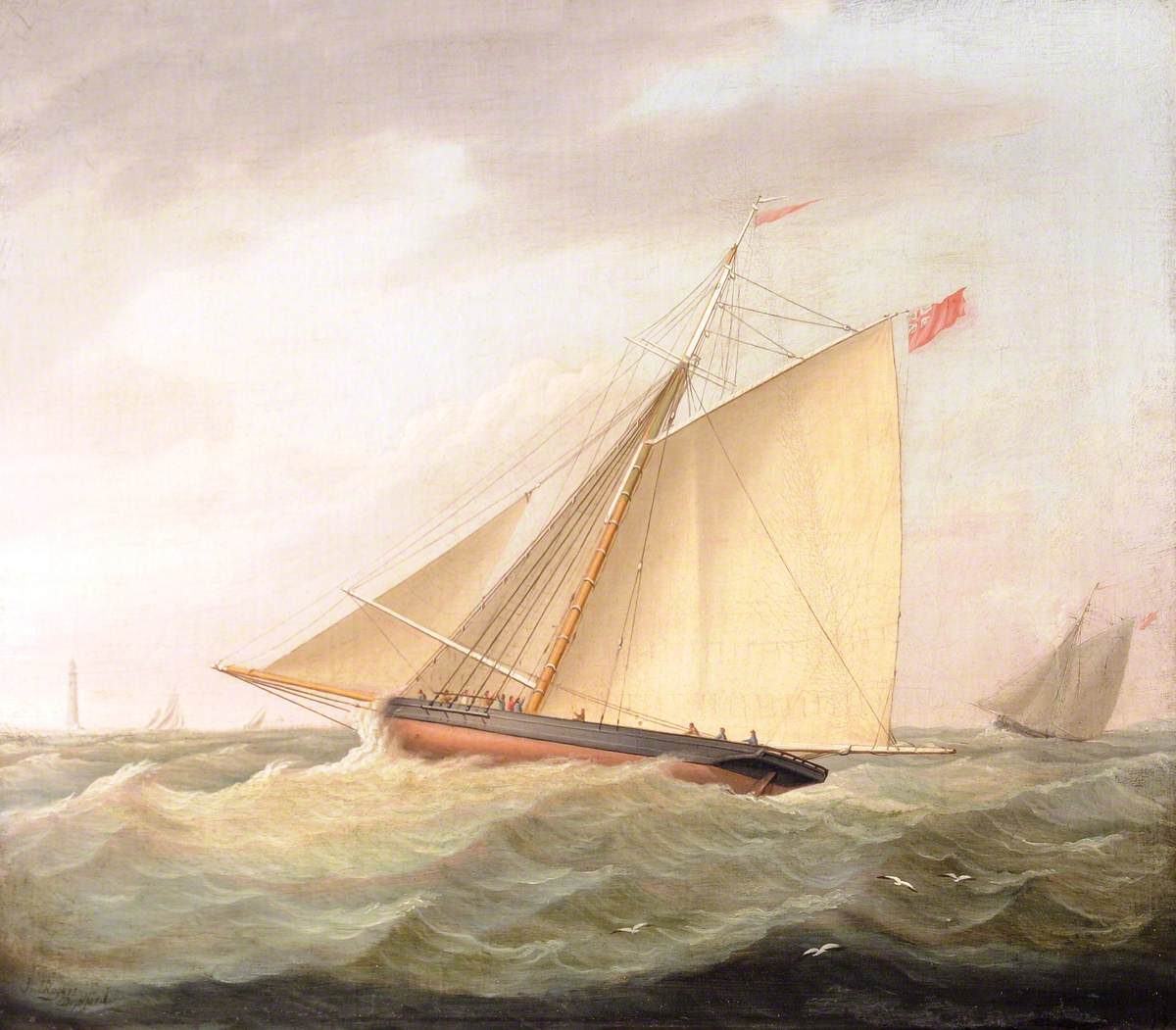
The Yacht Pearl

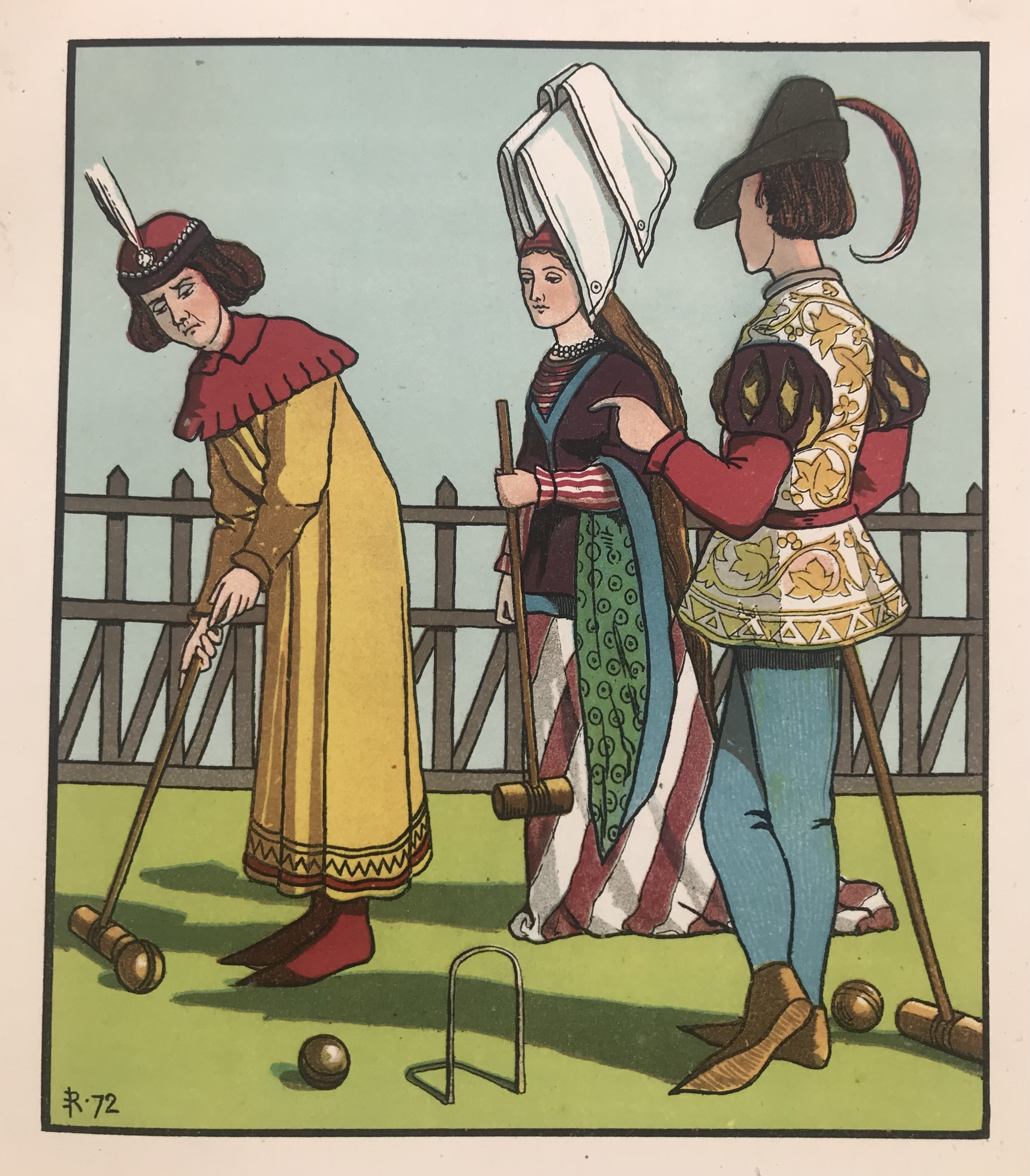
"Croquet", 1872

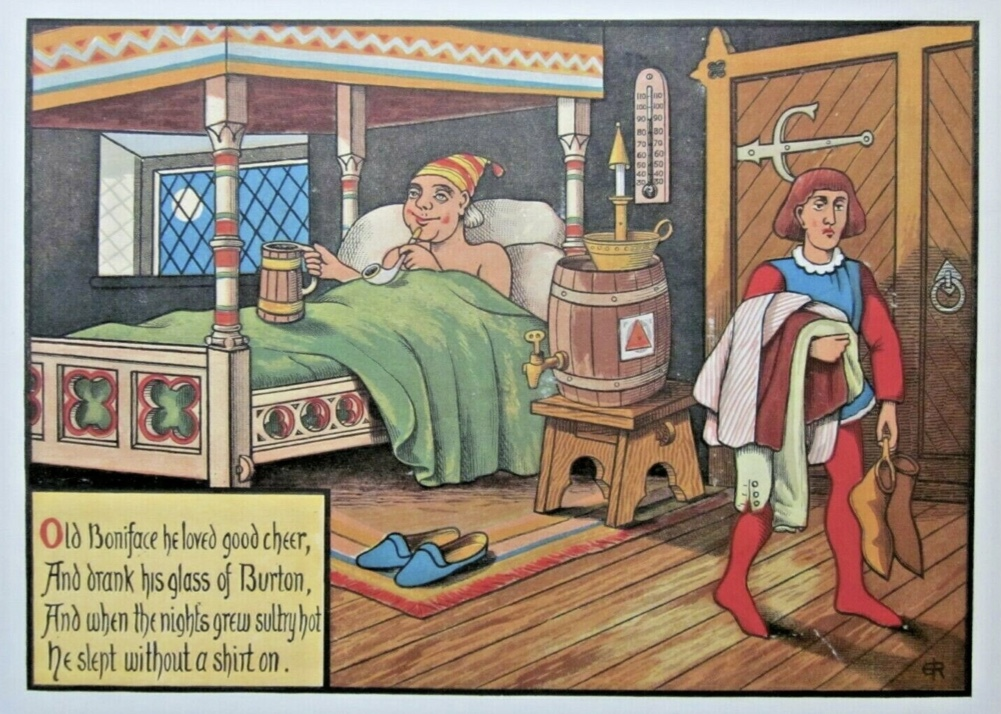
"Old Boniface", from Ridicula Rediviva

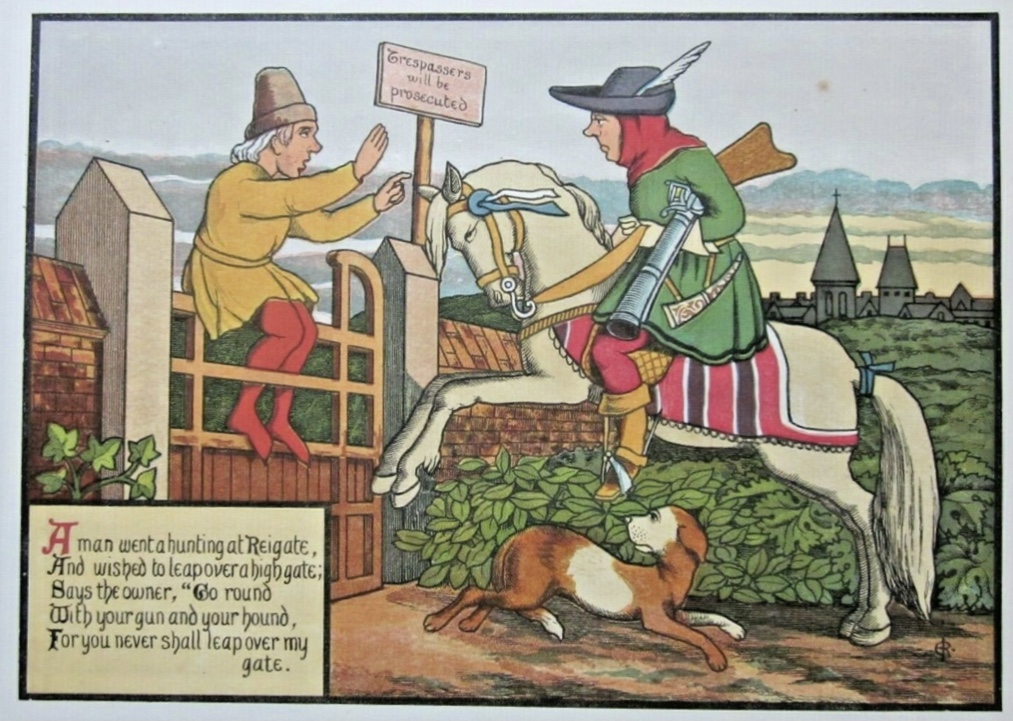
"A man went a hunting at Reigate" from Ridicula Rediviva

== Books ==
- J. E. Rogers, Ridicula Rediviva (London: Macmillan, 1869)
- Dinah Craik, The Fairy Book (1870, illustrated J. E. Rogers)
- J. E. Rogers, Mores Ridiculi (London: Macmillan, 1871)
- J. E. Rogers, Present Pastimes of Merrie England (Cassell, Petter, & Galpin, 1873)
