= Mater Misericordiae University Hospital =

Hospital in Dublin, Ireland

- Health Service Executive
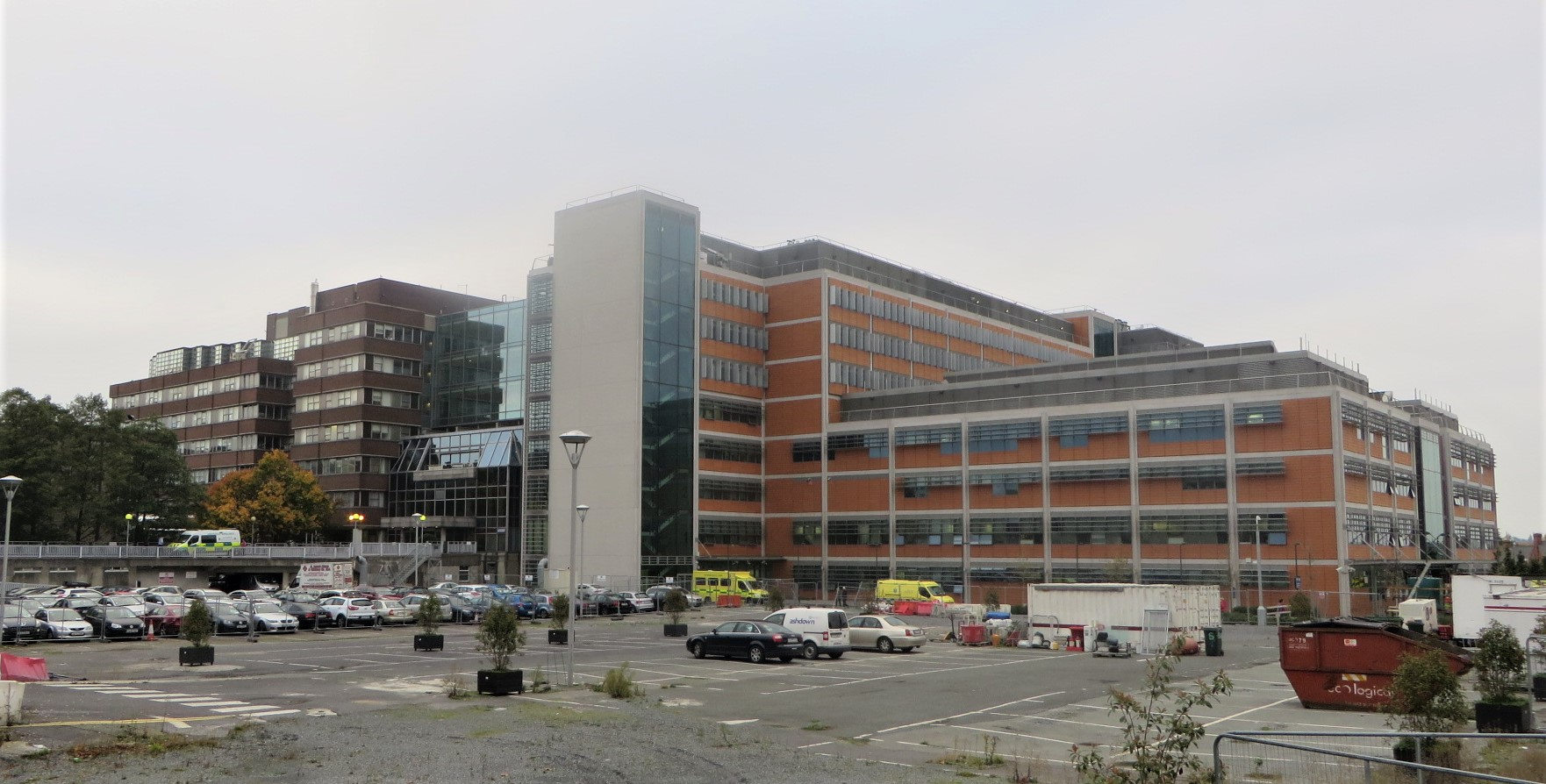
- The Mater Hospital, Dublin

- Shown in Dublin

Geography
- Location: Eccles Street, Dublin, Ireland
- Coordinates: 53.359274°N 6.268956°W

Organisation
- Care system: HSE
- Type: Teaching
- Affiliated university: University College Dublin

Services
- Emergency department: Major Trauma Centre
- Beds: 997

History
- Founded: 1861

Links
- Website: http://www.mater.ie
- Lists: Hospitals in the Republic of Ireland

The Mater Misericordiae University Hospital, commonly known as the Mater, is a teaching hospital, on Eccles Street in Phibsborough, Dublin, Ireland. It is managed by Ireland East Hospital Group. The Mater serves as one of two major trauma centres for Ireland: the other is Cork University Hospital.

== History ==
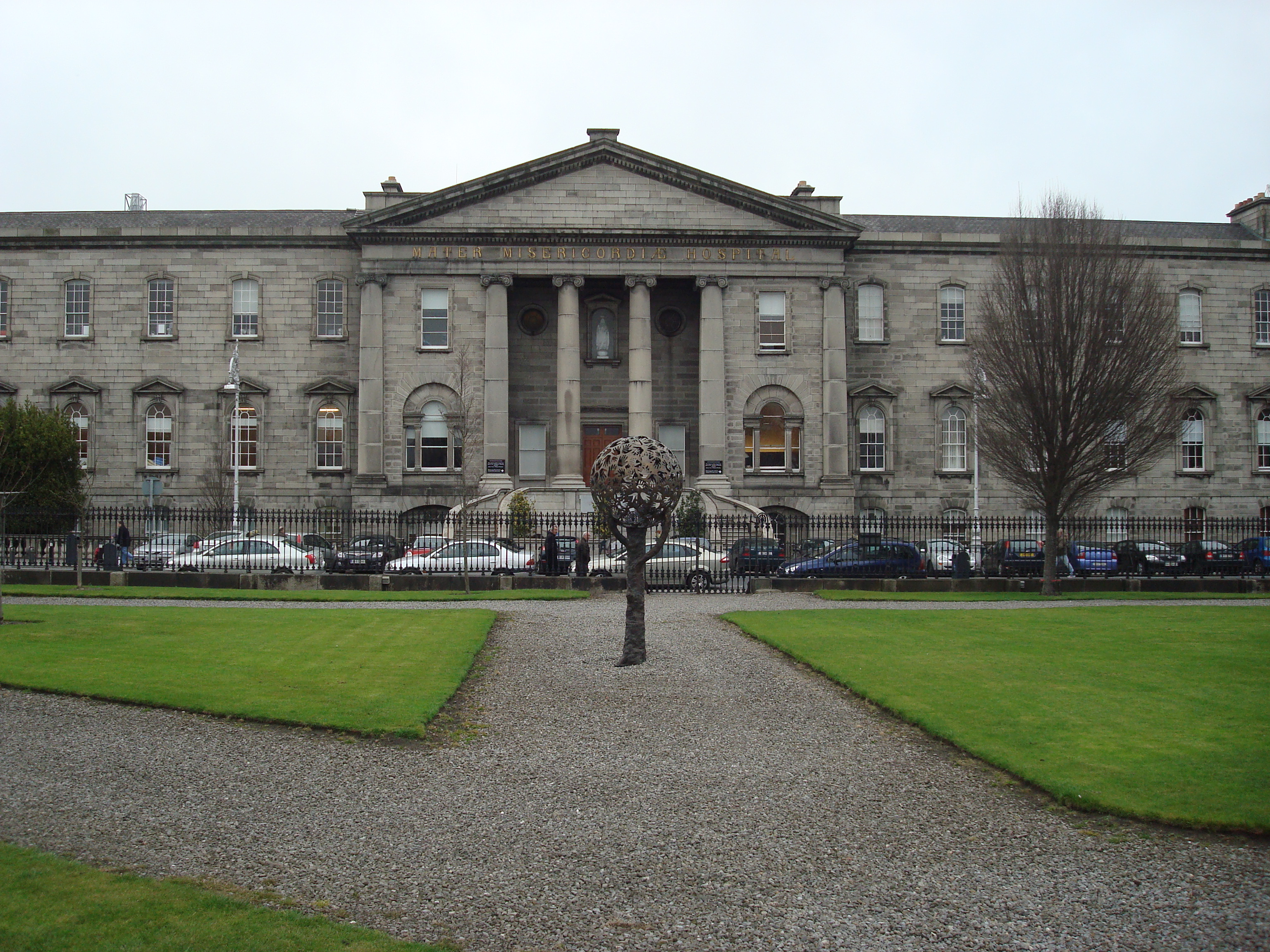
Old entrance to the hospital

The hospital was founded as an initiative of Catherine McAuley of the Sisters of Mercy and was officially opened by Daniel Murray, Archbishop of Dublin, on 24 September 1861. Mater misericordiae means "Mother of Mercy" in Latin, a title of the Virgin Mary and alludes to its founders, the Sisters of Mercy. Electric light, a major step in the improvement of endoscopy, was first used by Sir Francis Cruise, to allow cystoscopy, hysteroscopy and sigmoidoscopy as well as the examination of the nasal (and later thoracic) cavities at the hospital in 1865. It became the first hospital in Ireland to remain open 24 hours a day when it dealt with a cholera epidemic in 1886.

In 2003, the National Pulmonary Hypertension Unit, the leading centre for the treatment of pulmonary hypertension in Ireland, was established at the hospital and, in 2008, the hospital became the first public hospital in Ireland to offer percutaneous aortic valve replacement.

== Services ==
The hospital, which is a teaching hospital for the University College Dublin, has 745 in patient beds, along with 225 Day Beds and 16 Operating Theatres. It contains a negative-pressure ventilation ward which houses the National Bio-Terrorism Unit, and is the National Centre in Ireland for various services. The newly established Rock Wing will also include a 24-bed trauma ward, helping the hospital to become one of Ireland's two Major Trauma Centres.

== Notable staff ==
- Mary McGivney (1865–1932) Royal Red Cross, Matron from 1892 to 1920. She trained at The London Hospital, Whitechapel, London under Eva Luckes between 1888 and 1889.

== See also ==
- List of hospitals in the Republic of Ireland
- Dublin Hospitals Rugby Cup
