= Carmichael School of Medicine =

Irish medical school

Carmichael School of Medicine was a medical school in Dublin, Ireland opened in 1864.

== History ==
The school was founded in 1864 with funds bequeathed by Richard Carmichael. Designed in 1864 as a school of medicine beside the then three northside hospitals (Brunswick, Richmond and the Hardwicke). Built at a cost of £6,000, the school opened in 1865 and, though it flourished for a time, the competition of the city centre medical schools affected the numbers of students attending.

The school was relocated to Aungier Street, corner of Whitefriar Street, as 'The Carmichael College of Medicine' until 1889, when it was amalgamated with the Royal College of Surgeons in Ireland.

The original Carmichael building in North Brunswick Street is still standing and is now office accommodation. The architect, James Edward Rogers, was the favourite student of Benjamin Woodward, and the building's design is in a Lombardesque Revival style and with some sculpture similar to Deane & Woodward's Trinity Museum.

The Archiseek architecture information website includes this description of the building in an extract from The Dublin Builder, October 15, 1864:

"The new Carmichael School of Medicine, of which an illustration is given with present number, is rapidly approaching completion, and has been erected, in accordance with a provision in the will of the late Surgeon Richard Carmichael, who made the munificent bequest of £8,000, to be devoted to the cost of the building and the purchase of the ground. The materials used in the construction are granite, black stone, Tullamore limestone, Portland, Caen, and Cumberland red stone. The front is faced with rough punched granite ashlar, which contrasts well with the Caen and Portland stone of the dressings; the glitter and corbels supporting it are of Portland, as are all the projecting strings and hoodmoulds. The flanks are faced with black stone for the sake of economy; indeed, it may be well to remark that the extent of the building, the serious and unavoidable extra upon the foundations (nearly £400), and the sum at his disposal, prevented the architect from indulging in any decoration except upon the front, and there only sparingly. When we consider the number of rooms it contains, and the area which the building covers, the new Carmichael School must be pronounced a remarkably cheap building at £6,000, which will be about the cost when everything is completed.

The roof over hall and staircase is arranged in a novel manner, being a hammer beam carrying a lantern. The dissecting-room roof is a king post, span 21 feet; the anatomical and chemical theatres 25 feet span, queen post.

The dissecting-room floor is tiled, being formed of brick arches carried on iron girders 10 feet apart. The floor has been executed in accordance with the directions of W. Anderson, Esq., C.E., of Messrs. Courtney and Stephens, Blackhall-place. The advantage of this floor is, that it can be easily flushed with water, which, in a dissecting room, is very desirable. There is a Portland stone channel course along one wall of this room towards which the floor has a fall; the water is carried out by a pipe through the wall to the drain.

The stairs are granite, with an ornamental iron balustrade set in a Caen stone plinth supporting the handrail.

The upper arcade of the staircase is formed with three flat arches, carried by Portland stone piers with carved capitals and bases; the parapet of Caen stone is pierced with a geometrical pattern. The proprietors have adopted the system of electric bells. The carvings have been very creditably executed by Mr. Harrison, under the directions of the architect.

We feel it a duty to record the generosity of Mrs. Carmichael, the widow of the founder, who has nobly endeavoured to second her husband's munificent intentions by placing the money at the immediate disposal of the proprietors, instead of reserving it for her use, as she might have done, until after her death.

The architect of the building is Mr. James Edward Rogers, 205, Great Brunswick-street, on whom the design, however simple, reflects the highest credit. The different materials used in the exterior are artistically and quietly disposed, and the details are bold and good, and sufficiently uncommon to deserve more than ordinary notice, in asmuch [sic?] as they are a step towards what we yet hope to see universal in practice. The vigour and beauty of Gothic detail applied to buildings which, save for these, would present the familiar appearance in general disposition of their parts, of what some people call the "common sense"school. The public, right or wrong, will have buildings of this type, and are so wedded to it that we are never likely to see a revival of the picturesque type of Gothic to any extent : and it appears far from impossible to engraft on this accepted style some of the boldness of Gothic treatment, without either bad taste or incongruity."

== Famous Alumni and teachers ==
- Francis Cruise (surgeon), Irish surgeon and urologist; known for inventing an endoscope
