= Sir Alexander Macdonnell, 1st Baronet =

Sir Alexander MacDonnell, 1st Baronet (1794–1875) was an Irish civil servant, commissioner of national education in Ireland.

== Life ==
MacDonnell, eldest son of the physician and polymath James MacDonnell, was born at Belfast in 1794. He gained a king's scholarship at Westminster School in 1809, and was elected in 1813 to Christ Church, Oxford, where he held a studentship until 1826. He graduated B.A. 1816, and M.A. 1820, and won four university prizes—those for Latin and English verse and for the Latin and English essays – an accumulation of honours only once before achieved.

He was called to the bar at Lincoln's Inn, 23 November 1824, went the midland circuit, attended the Leicester and Northampton sessions, and served as a commissioner of inquiry into public charities. Of an exceedingly sensitive temperament, he broke down in pleading a case before a committee of the House of Lords, and, mortified beyond expression, renounced the bar, returned to Ireland, and accepted the position of chief clerk in the chief secretary's office under Thomas Drummond (1797–1840).

In 1839 he was appointed resident commissioner of the board of education, of which he became the presiding genius. While himself an ardent Protestant, he persistently sought to provide for his poorer countrymen the religious instruction of their choice. He was made a privy councillor of Ireland in 1846, resigned his commissionership in December 1871, and was created a baronet 20 January 1872. Study of the classics and history formed the chief solace of his retirement. During his tenure the Irish language went into serious decline as an English language only education system coupled with massive emigration caused irreparable cultural damage.

He died at 32 Upper Fitzwilliam Street, Dublin, 21 January 1875, and was buried at Kilsharvan, near Drogheda. He married in 1826 Barbara, eldest daughter of Hugh Montgomery of Benvarden, County Antrim, and widow of Richard Staples. She died at Kilsharvan, 6 April 1865, leaving no issue.

Baronetage of the United Kingdom
New creation	Baronet (of Kilsharvan); 1872–1875	Extinct
