= Battle of Kilthomas =

Battle during irish rebellion 1798

The Battle of Kilthomas took place on 27 May 1798 when combined Loyalist Forces defeated a gathering of several thousand rebels in the greater Ferns/Carnew area, in one of the primary actions of the rebellion in County Wexford. This occurred at the same time as the Battle of Oulart Hill in the east of the county.

== Background ==
Following the first news of the United Irishmen rebellion having risen in the midlands reaching Wexford on 26 May, and the action at the Harrow that evening, a great swathe of mid and northwest County Wexford parishes began to gather throughout the night of 26/27 May 1798. Daniel Gahan describes this rising as a 'crescent of United Irish mobilisation', with the western parishes to converge at Kilthomas Hill on the morning of 27 May.

One such group of one hundred or so had gathered on the evening of 26 May at The Harrow, near the parish of Boolavogue under the tutelage of Fr. John Murphy when they encountered a patrol of about 20 yeomen on their way to the house of a suspected rebel. They burned the suspect's dwelling but, returning empty-handed, they encountered Fr. Murphy's band again. The patrol were pushing their way through when a skirmish began in which they lost two of their number, the rest fleeing with news of the killings.

The townland of Kilthomas itself forms a part of a series of townlands on an inferior southern ridge of Slieveboy (Sliabh Buí) Mountain, and straddled by the main route between Ferns/Camolin, and Carnew. This is an elevated site that provides a significant overlook to most of middle County Wexford, including a view to both Carrigrew Hill and Oulart Hill, key rebel locations.

== Battle of Kilthomas, 27 May 1798 ==
In respect of Kilthomas there is significantly less mentioned by both loyalist and nationalist sources. This bias can likely be explained by the fact that the nationalists did not want to dwell on an early defeat, and the loyalists did not want to dwell on the massacre nature of the battles aftermath. At this point it can be suggested that this group may not have had the time or space to turn and fight.

During the night of 26 May 1798, several groups of rebels gathered at different locations, notably to the west of Ferns, on the east bank of the River Slaney. Taylor goes into more detail here and indicates that the rebels had originally assembled in the area of Charlesfort (Tombrack) and Ballingale (Ballycarney), where he notes an attack on protestant residences at both locations. Sources indicate that the militia and yeomanry at the Ferns/Camolin side of Kilthomas had met in a large body prior to the engagement, with Wheeler listing the 'Camolin Cavalry..., the Enniscorthy [under Captain Solomon Richards] and Healthfield Yeoman Cavalry [under Captain John Grogan]'. George Taylor indicates the Scarawalsh infantry under the command of Captain Cornock, in this group. Around the same time on the morning on 27 May, Fr Michael Murphy made his way from Ballycanew around the district adjacent to Gorey. Hay accounts for significant travels by Michael Murphy on the Sunday morning, culminating in him joining the rebel force at Kilthomas.

As the numbers began to increase on Kilthomas over the course of the day, a foray out of Carnew by its garrison ended up with a skirmish at 'Ballinrush' (Bolinrush), where the rebels were driven back from Carnew towards Kilthomas. This was conducted by the Antrim Militia, under Captain Rowan, along with 'two corps of yeomen infantry, and one of cavalry'. Musgrave continues that a detachment of the Shilela (Shillelagh, or sometimes referred to as the Carnew or Coolatin-) Cavalry, under the command of Captain Wainwright, had been driven back by rebels in the afternoon. This detachment subsequently set upon the rebel mass at the Battle of Kilthomas proper. From a combined approach to the sources, it seems that the aforementioned units, along with the units out of Carnew, fought piecemeal actions over the course of the day.

This resulted in the rebels losing between 150 and 300 men, though sources of differing bias disagree on the actual number. Subsequently, the loyalist forces went on a seven-mile march, burning up to 100 cabins and two Catholic churches in the process. This account would fit the description given by Fr Kavanagh in his description of the battle.

== Outcome ==
It appears from the sources that the rebels at Kilthomas fought piecemeal over the course of the day. Rebels may have been somewhat dispersed by the end of the day, and the sources are not explicit in whether there was a full flight of rebels from the hillside or if the main group held their ground. It would appear that on the morning of 28 May 1798 this group met with the Oulart Rebels (who encamped at Carrigrew), on their march towards Scarawalsh Bridge, from where the combined force paused at Ballyorrill, before attacking the town of Enniscorthy that afternoon.
