= North Cork Rifles =

Auxiliary unit of the British Army

North Cork Militia North Cork Rifles 9th Bn, King's Royal Rifle Corps
- Active: March 1793–31 July 1908
- Country: Ireland (1793–1800); United Kingdom (1801–1908)
- Branch: Irish Militia
- Role: Infantry
- Size: Battalion
- Part of: King's Royal Rifle Corps
- Garrison/HQ: Fermoy; Mallow
- Engagements: Irish Rebellion of 1798: Battle of Oulart Hill; Battle of Enniscorthy; Battle of Arklow; Battle of Goff's Bridge; Battle of Vinegar Hill; Second Boer War

The North Cork Rifles was a regiment of the Irish Militia raised in County Cork in 1793. It saw a great deal of action during the Irish Rebellion of 1798, suffering many casualties. It later became a battalion of the King's Royal Rifle Corps (KRRC) and served in South Africa during the Second Boer War, mainly on railway defence and convoy escort. It was disbanded in 1908.

== Precursors ==
Although there are scattered references to town guards and local units, no organised militia existed in Ireland before 1660. After the Stuart Restoration more formal militia forces were organised. In August 1666 the Lord Lieutenant, the Duke of Ormond, made a 'progress' through County Cork and was accompanied by the horse militia of each barony. During the Williamite War in Ireland the Governor of Cork, Sir Richard Cox, increased the militia of the county to three regiments of foot (6000 men) and 26 independent troops of horse in 1691, which played an active part in the fighting. In 1715 the Irish Militia came under statutory authority, but its numbers fell away until the War of American Independence when, with a serious threat of invasion by the Americans' allies, France and Spain, Ireland had no national militia. It was not until the outbreak of the French Revolutionary War In 1793 that the Irish administration passed an effective Militia Act that created an official Irish Militia. The new Act was based on existing English precedents, with the men being conscripted by ballot to fill county quotas (paid substitutes were permitted) and the officers having to meet certain property qualifications.

== North Cork Militia ==
=== French Revolutionary War ===
In March 1793 County Cork was given a quota of 1464 men to find, to be organised into three regiments each of 488 men in 8 companies:

- North Cork Militia at Fermoy
- South Cork Militia at Rathcormac
- Royal Cork City Militia>

The new militia was widely unpopular, and Cork was one of the slower counties to fill its quota. The order to embody the three regiments for service was not issued until 30 September and it was not carried out until 15 October. In 1795 the Irish militia was augmented, and each of the County Cork regiments was raised to an establishment of 612 men.

The French Revolutionary and Napoleonic Wars saw the British and Irish militia embodied for a whole generation, becoming regiments of full-time professional soldiers (though restricted to service in Britain or Ireland respectively), which the regular army increasingly saw as a prime source of recruits. They served in coast defences, manned garrisons, guarded prisoners of war, and carried out internal security duties. In August 1794 the North Cork regiment was stationed at Mitchelstown, with a company detached to Mallow.

Anxiety about a possible French invasion grew during the autumn of 1796 and preparations were made for field operations. A large French expeditionary force appeared in Bantry Bay on 21 December and troops from all over Ireland were marched towards the threatened area. Soon afterwards news arrived that the French fleet had been scattered by the winter storms. Several ships had been wrecked and none of the French troops succeeded in landing; there was no sign of a rising by the United Irishmen. The invasion was called off on 29 December, and the troop concentration was dispersed in early 1797.

Early in 1797 the light companies of the militia were detached to join composite battalions drawn from several militia and regular regiments. The light companies of the three Cork regiments joined 1st Light Battalion. The militia regiments were each issued with two light six-pounder 'battalion guns', with the gun detachments trained by the Royal Artillery. When the militiamen of 1793 reached the end of their four-year enlistment in 1797, most of the Irish regiments were able to maintain their numbers through re-enlistments (for a bounty).

=== Irish Rebellion ===
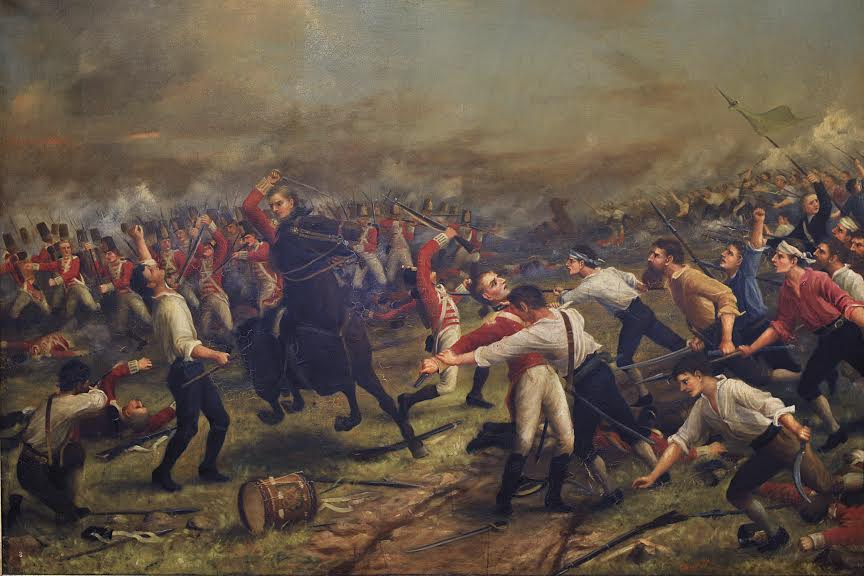
1898 painting of the United Irishmen's charge at Oulart Hill.

The expected Irish Rebellion finally broke out in May 1798, with large rebel forces active in County Wexford. At that time a wing of the North Cork Militia was stationed at the town of Wexford. (Note: Maxwell places the North Cork Militia in St Stephen's Green, Dublin, on 23–4 May. However, in other passages he places them in Co Wexford. Other sources state that it was the Royal Cork Militia that was on duty in Stephen's Green on the outbreak of the rebellion.) A considerable body of insurgents gathered on Oulart Hill about 8 miles (13 km) from Wexford and Lt-Col Foote with a detachment of the regiment, reported at 110 men, went out on 27 May to disperse this gathering. Foote joined up with a Troop of Yeomanry Cavalry – only 16 strong, the remainder having joined the rebels – and marched towards Oulart. The advance party of the rebels fired from the cover of the hedges, but then fled. The militia pursued them up the hill without taking precautions, despite Foote's efforts to reform them. The main body of the rebels on this hill, armed only with pikes but believing that they were surrounded and would have to fight it out, turned and overwhelmed the militia. Foote got back to Wexford with one sergeant and three privates, from which writers have assumed that the other 105 were killed; 6 officers died. After this disaster a number of small government-held positions were abandoned and their garrisons concentrated at larger posts. Another detachment of the North Cork Militia was in action at Ballitore in County Kildare, on the same day as the Battle of Oulart Hill.

The main rebel force was gathered at Vinegar Hill, and after Oulart the garrison of nearby Enniscorthy was on full alert. An 80-strong detachment of the North Cork Militia under Captain Snowe held the bridge over the River Slaney, a yeomanry cavalry detachment held the street connecting it to the town, and the Duffry Gate on the Carlow Road was protected by the yeomanry infantry. Key points such as Enniscorthy Castle and the market house each had a sergeant's guard for protection. The insurgents made their first attack on 28 May against the yeomanry infantry drawn up in line 3–400 yards (2.7–365.8 m) in front of the Duffry Gate. The yeomanry opened fire, but the insurgents drove cattle in front of their advance and extended to threaten both flanks so, covered by a charge by the yeomanry cavalry, they withdrew to the town. The North Cork Militia drove off an attempt to cross the bridge, but the insurgents then forded the river out of range of the militia's muskets. The suburbs of the town were now on fire, and the garrison retreated to hold the market square. Eventually the musketry of the loyalist troops began to tell on the poorly armed rebels, and another party of rebels advancing from Vinegar Hill was driven off by a company of the North Corks. The loyalists regained control of the town, but having lost around a third of their force (rebel casualties were much higher) and being completely outnumbered, the garrison decided to evacuate the burning town before nightfall and withdraw on Wexford. Having captured and sacked Enniscorthy, the Wexford rebels made Vinegar Hill their main encampment.

The town of Wexford was garrisoned by 300 of the North Cork Militia, about the same number of local yeomanry horse and foot, and had been reinforced by 200 men of the Donegal Militia, who occupied Windmill Hill outside the town. With most of Co Wexford in rebellion, the town needed reinforcements, but the advance guard of the Meath Militia marching to Wexford without precautions was ambushed and overrun at Forth Mountain (the Battle of Three Rocks) on 30 May. The commanders at Wexford decided that without reinforcements the large town was indefensible and ordered a retreat to Duncannon Fort. Some of the North Cork Militia may have abandoned their positions even before the order was given. The Donegal Militia fought their way out by Forth Mountain, the North Cork under Capt Snowe had got to within 6 miles (9.7 km) of Duncannon after dark when they were attacked in the rear by a party of rebel horse. After firing a few shots the militia ran to Taylorstown Bridge, where they came under fire and a number of militiamen and loyalists were killed, while about 50 militia and yeomanry were captured.

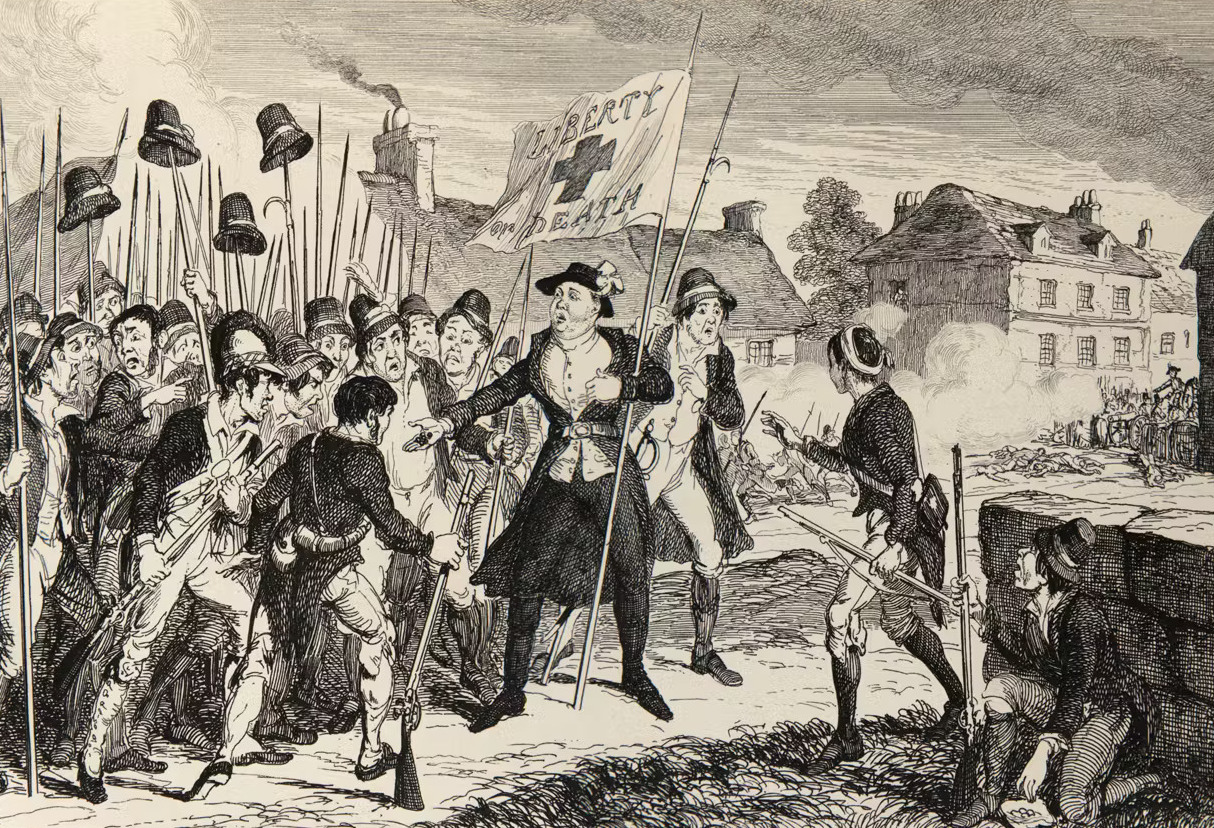
1845 engraving of the Battle of Arklow.

Meanwhile the detached Light Company of the North Cork Militia formed part of the garrison of Carlow that drove off a disorderly attack on 25 May, killing large numbers of rebels in the subsequent pursuit. Another detachment of the North Cork Militia, together with some of the Antrim Militia, reinforced the Wingfield Cavalry (known as the 'Black Mob') under Capt John Hunter Gowan and defeated a group of rebels at Ballycanew on 1 June. As the insurgents advanced into County Wicklow, reinforcements were sent from Dublin to strengthen the garrison of Arklow. A detachment of 1 subaltern, 1 sergeant, 1 drummer and 28 other ranks (ORs) of the North Cork formed part of 1st Brigade. On the evening of 9 June a large mass of rebels with two cannons was observed advancing on the barricades protecting the lower town. The rebels threw themselves repeatedly against the musketry and battalion guns of the defenders until they began to fall back as darkness fell. The defeat at the Battle of Arklow halted the rebels' advance, and they retreated into Cos Wexford and Kilkenny.

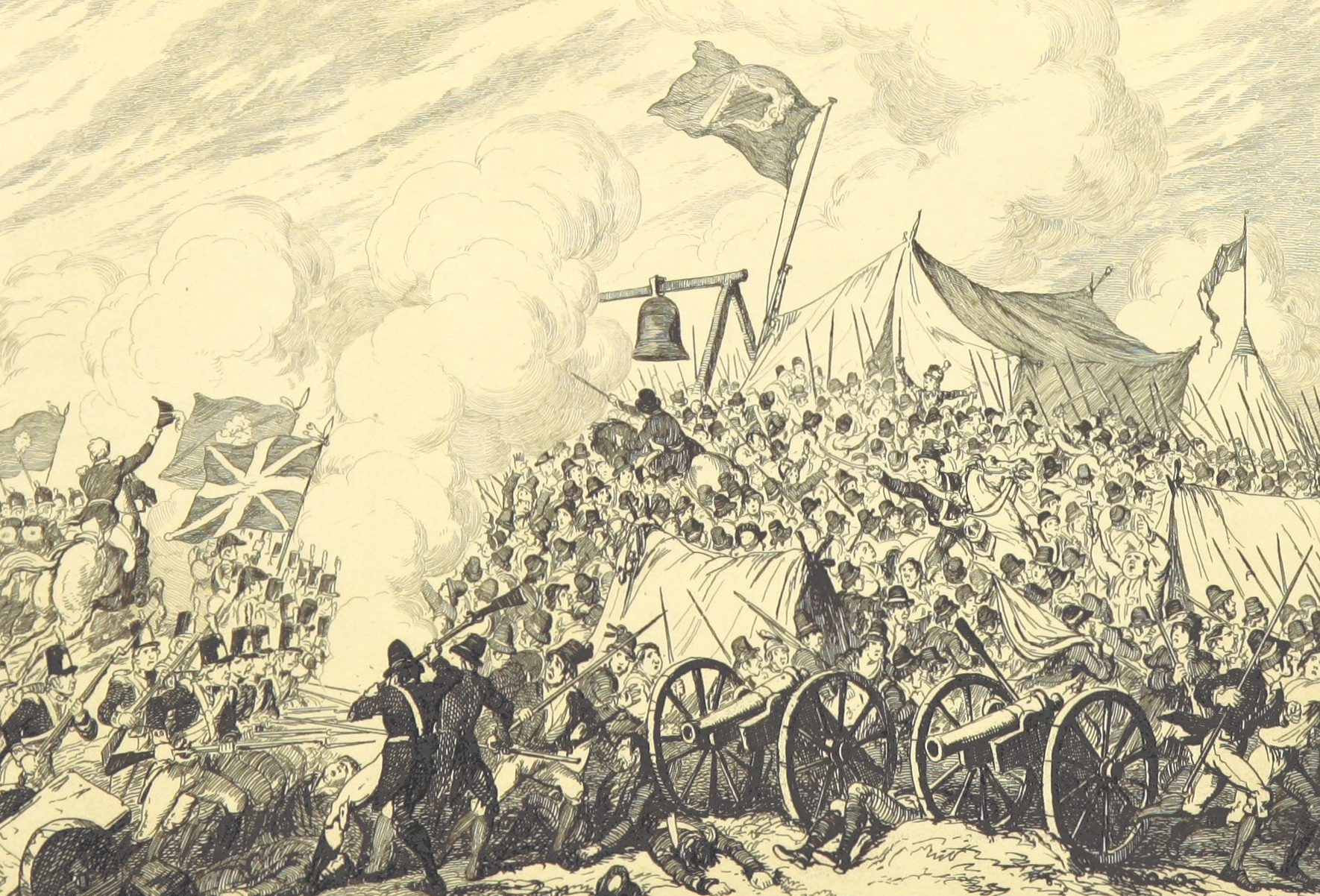
1845 engraving of the Battle of Vinegar Hill.

The government troops under Lieutenant-General Gerard Lake now concentrated for an advance against the camp on Vinegar Hill. On 20 June Major-General John Moore's column, including the militia light battalions, cleared Goff's Bridge (the Battle of Foulksmills) and Vinegar Hill was attacked at dawn on 21 June. Lake's columns came under fire from rebel skirmishers among the hedges, but they advanced steadily, converging on the hill, capturing the rebel cannon, and clearing the camp and the town of Enniscorthy. 1st Light Bn suffered a number of casualties in this action. The decisive defeat at the Battle of Vinegar Hill broke the Wexford Rebellion, but there were still rebels active in Cos Kildare and Kilkenny. A detachment of 100 of the North Cork formed part of General Dunn's force that successfully defended Athy on 24 June and then followed the defeated rebels to Goresbridge, where they were taken in the rear. The rebels broke and ran, and many were killed in a pursuit lasting two hours. Over the following weeks the remaining rebel groups in other parts of Ireland were largely destroyed before a French force arrived on 22 August. It was too late to affect the outcome, and after initial success was forced to surrender on 8 September.

Robert Uniacke Fitzgerald,Member of Parliament for County Cork, was appointed Colonel of the North Cork Militia on 3 November 1798. His son, also named Robert Uniacke Fitzgerald, was appointed supernumerary lieutenant-colonel of the regiment on 17 May 1801, and several other members of the Uniacke family were also commissioned as officers in the regiment.

After the rebellion the Irish Militia settled down to garrison duty once more. With the diminishing threat of invasion after 1799, the strength of the militia could be reduced, and the surplus men were encouraged to volunteer for regiments of the line. The light battalions were reformed in 1800, with the Cork companies once more in 1st Light Bn.

By the end of 1801 peace negotiations with the French were progressing, so recruiting and re-enlistment for the Irish Militia was stopped in October. The men received the new clothing they were due on 25 December, but the Treaty of Amiens was signed in March 1802 after which the militia regiments were disembodied leaving only the permanent staff of non-commissioned officers (NCOs) and drummers under the regimental adjutant.

=== Napoleonic Wars ===
However, the Peace of Amiens was short-lived and preparations to re-embody the militia began in November 1802. Early in 1803 the regiments were ordered to begin re-enrolling former militiamen and new volunteers as well as using the ballot. The proclamation to embody the militia was issued on 15 March and carried out on 25 March.

Anti-invasion preparations were now put in hand and the reconstituted militia regiments underwent training. The light battalions were reformed in September 1803 but were discontinued in 1806. Over the following years the regiments carried out garrison duties at various towns across Ireland and attended summer training camps. For example, the North Cork regiment was in camp at The Curragh in the summer of 1804. As the war progressed, the Regular Army increasingly relied on volunteers from the militia for trained recruits. In 1805 the militia establishment was raised to allow for this. In June 1813 the East Norfolk Militia was ordered back to England after a period of service in Ireland and the North Corks relieved it in its billets across County Limerick and County Clare..

The Napoleonic Wars were brought to an end by the Battle of Waterloo in 1815, and the North Cork Militia was finally disembodied on 1 April 1816.

== North Cork Rifles ==
After Waterloo there was a long peace. Although ballots were still held until they were suspended by the Militia Act 1829, the regiments were rarely assembled for training. The permanent staffs of sergeants and drummers (who were occasionally used to maintain public order) were progressively reduced, though the statutory establishment of the disembodied regiment was still eight companies. Officers continued to be commissioned sporadically. William Moore-Hodder of Hoddersfield was appointed colonel of the North Cork Militia on 1 March 1831, with William T. French as his Lt-Col (3 February 1832). In 1845–46 there was an effort to replace elderly members of the permanent staff and to appoint a few younger officers from the county gentry, though they had no duties to perform. The regiment was redesignated the North Cork Militia (Rifles) and adopted a Rifle green uniform at some time before 1850.

The Militia of the United Kingdom was revived by the Militia Act 1852, enacted during a period of international tension. As before, units were raised and administered on a county basis, and filled by voluntary enlistment (although conscription by means of the Militia Ballot might be used if the counties failed to meet their quotas). Training was for 56 days on enlistment, then for 21–28 days per year, during which the men received full army pay. Under the Act, Militia units could be embodied by Royal Proclamation for full-time home defence 'in case of national danger or pressing necessity'.

When the regiment was revived in 1852 it was designated as the North Cork Rifles. Colonel Hodder was still in command, and William St Leger Alcock Stawell of Kilbrittain Castle, formerly a captain in the 23rd Foot and Lt-Col of the South Cork Light Infantry, was transferred to become Lt-Col on 8 November 1854.

=== Crimean War & Indian Mutiny ===
The Crimean War having broken out and a large expeditionary force sent overseas, the militia were called out for home defence. By March 1855 the North Corks were stationed at Buttevant. They moved to Limerick during May, and were then at Curragh Camp by August. By the beginning of 1856 the regiment had moved to Aldershot Camp in England, where it remained until it was disembodied on 29 August 1856. .

There was a partial mobilisation of the militia when large forces were sent to suppress the Indian Mutiny in 1857. The North Cork Rifles were embodied on 15 September 1857 and crossed to England again, being stationed first at Portsmouth then at Shorncliffe Camp. They moved to Sheerness during June 1858, and then back to Aldershot by the beginning of November 1858, where the regiment stayed for a year.

During October 1859 the regiment moved to Hamilton and Ayr in Scotland. Col Hodder died from a fall from his horse on 29 November 1859 while commanding the regiment at Ayr. After the 1852 reforms the rank of colonel in the militia was abolished, and progressively the lieutenant-colonels became the commanding officers. Thus Col Hodder was not replaced and Lt-Col Stawell remained in sole command. The regiment was disembodied on 28 February 1860

In the early 1860s Regimental HQ moved from Fermoy to Mallow. Over the following years the regiments mustered for 21 or 28 days' training, though annual training for the Irish Militia was suspended from 1866 to 1870 at the time of the Fenian crisis. The Militia Reserve introduced in 1867 consisted of present and former militiamen who undertook to serve overseas in case of war. Some of these were called out in 1878 during the Balkan Crisis.

=== Cardwell Reforms ===
Under the 'Localisation of the Forces' scheme introduced by the Cardwell Reforms of 1872, infantry militia regiments were brigaded with their local linked regular regiments. For the Cork Militia this was in Sub-District No 70 (Counties of Kerry, Cork and Clare) in Cork District of Irish Command:

- 101st Regiment of Foot (Royal Bengal Fusiliers)
- 104th Regiment of Foot (Bengal Fusiliers)
- South Cork Light Infantry at Bandon
- Clare Militia at Ennis
- Kerry Militia at Tralee
- North Cork Rifles at Mallow
- Royal Limerick County Militia at Limerick
- No 70 Brigade Depot was formed at Tralee

Although often referred to as brigades, the sub-districts were purely administrative organisations, but in a continuation of the Cardwell Reforms a mobilisation scheme began to appear in the Army List from December 1875. This assigned Regular and Militia units to places in an order of battle of corps, divisions and brigades for the 'Active Army', even though these formations were entirely theoretical, with no staff or services assigned. The North Cork Rifles were assigned to 2nd Brigade of 3rd Division, II Corps. The brigade, consisting of the North and South Cork and the Galway Militia, would have mustered at Horsham in Sussex in time of war.

== 9th King's Royal Rifle Corps ==
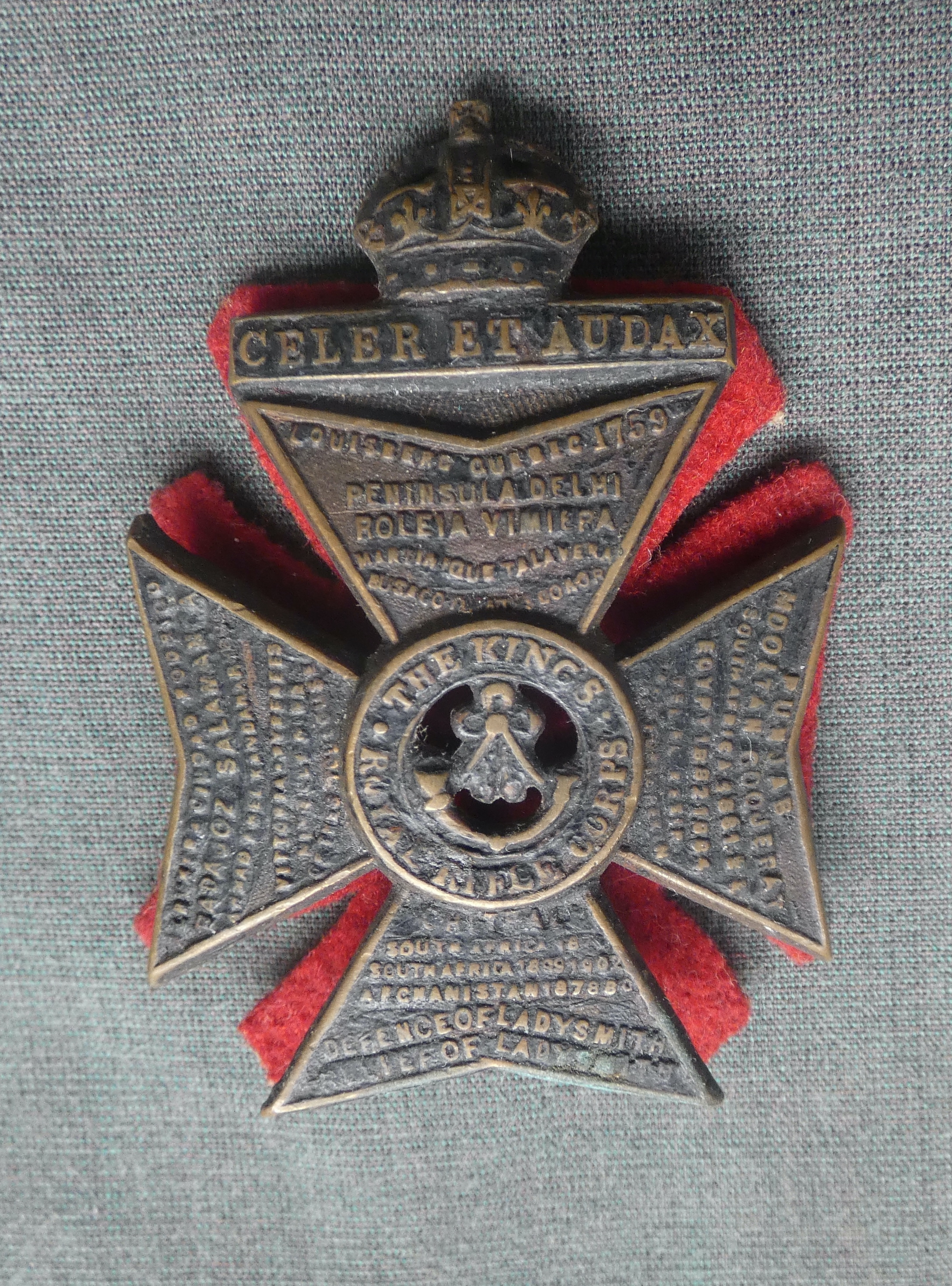
King's Royal Rifle Corps cap badge post Boer War.

The Childers Reforms took Cardwell's reforms further, with the militia regiments becoming numbered battalions of their linked regiments. On 1 July 1881 the 101st and 104th Regiments became the 1st and 2nd Battalions of the Royal Munster Fusiliers, with the South Cork LI as the 3rd Bn. However, the North Cork Rifles instead joined the King's Royal Rifle Corps (KRRC) as the 9th (North Cork Militia) Battalion. (Note: Not to be confused with the 9th (Service) Bn, KRRC, of 1914–18 or 9th Bn (The Rangers), KRRC, of 1941–47.)

=== Second Boer War ===
With the bulk of the Regular Army (reinforced by the Militia Reserve) serving in South Africa during the Second Boer War, the Militia were called out for home defence. The 9th Bn KRRC was embodied from 5 December 1899 and volunteered for overseas service. The battalion embarked at Queenstown on 13 January 1900 with a strength of 23 officers and 622 ORs under the command of Col William Cooke-Collis, and arrived at Cape Town on 1 February. It went to Nauwpoort and took over the defence of the Western Kopjes. On 8 February the Right Half Battalion under Maj William Stopford moved to Thebus to take over defence of the railway; two days later Battalion HQ and Left Half went to Arundel, leaving E Company at Tweedale. On 14 February Maj-Gen Ralph Clements' force evacuated Rensburg and fell back on Arundel, the half battalion taking part in the ensuing action before falling back to Nauwpoort and joining in the defence of the railway junction. The militia units in the garrison there were brigaded together under Col Cooke-Collis.

After the surrender of the main Boer army at Paardeberg the pressure on Nauwpoort was released and Clements was able to advance, repairing the railway as he went. In March Battalion HQ and three companies of the 9th KRRC were sent out to Steynsburg, joined by E Company, and on 13 March two other companies took over guard duties at the railway bridge between Kroomhoogte and Henning. On 2 April the whole battalion moved to Bethulie and two days later escorted a convoy of 100 ox waggons to Springfontein. From 10 April it held the Reit River Bridge, the only railway bridge in the Orange Free State left standing by the retreating Boers. On 7 May the battalion went to the Vet River to help the Royal Engineers make a deviation for the railway around the destroyed bridge. On 17 May it moved to the railhead at Virginia, and when the railway deviation was complete it moved on to Rhenoster. On 1 June two companies escorted a convoy to the railhead at Leuespruit, and being hard pressed the rest of the battalion went out to their assistance and forced the Boers to retire. Between 2 and 6 June the battalion was at Wolverhoek and Steenpan, and then went to guard the bridge at Taailbosch and take charge of some Boer prisoners. Afterwards it moved on to Taailbosch Kop, leaving two companies to guard the bridge and detaching two more to Vilgoens Drift Station. From Taailbosch Kop Battalion HQ was responsible for security of the 11 miles (18 km) of railway between Vereeniging and Wolverhoek. The Boers were active in the area and made several attempts to wreck the line. 9th KRRC provided frequent night patrols at varied times, and on 19 June a patrol surprised a party of Boers attempting to lay a mine on the railway south of Steenpan.

The battalion embarked for home at Cape Town on 6 July 1901, and was disembodied on 31 July.

The battalion lost 3 officers and 22 ORs killed or died of disease during the campaign. The participants received the Queen's South Africa Medal with clasps for 'Cape Colony', 'Orange Free State', 'Transvaal' and 'South Africa, 1901'. The battalion was granted the Battle honour South Africa 1900–01.

=== Disbandment ===
After the Boer War, the future of the militia was called into question. There were moves to reform the Auxiliary Forces (Militia, Yeomanry and Volunteers) to take their place in the six Army Corps proposed by the Secretary of State for War, St John Brodrick. However, little of Brodrick's scheme was carried out. Under the more sweeping Haldane Reforms of 1908, the Militia was replaced by the Special Reserve (SR), a semi-professional force whose role was to provide reinforcement drafts for regular units serving overseas in wartime, rather like the earlier Militia Reserve. The 9th KRRC did not transfer to the new force and was disbanded on 31 July 1908.

== Heritage & ceremonial ==
=== Uniforms ===
When the Irish militia was established in 1793 it was uniformed in the same red coats as the Line infantry. After the North Cork Militia was converted into a rifle corps, it wore a Rifle green uniform with black facings, similar to the Rifle Brigade. When it became a battalion of the KRRC it retained the Rifle green uniform, but changed to the scarlet facings of the KRRC, and adopted that regiment's badges and insignia.

=== Precedence ===
The North Cork Militia ranked 34th in the list of Irish Militia regiments in 1794 and 1798.

The lists of militia precedence established during the Napoleonic Wars continued until 1833, when King William IV drew lots for a new list for the whole of the United Kingdom. The first 69 places went to regiments raised before the peace of 1783. The next 60 consisted of those raised during the French Revolutionary War, including all the Irish regiments. North Cork received the 116th place, which it retained when the list was revised for the last time in 1855.

=== Commanders ===
Commanding officers of the North Cork Militia and its successors included the following:

Colonels

- Robert Uniacke Fitzgerald, MP, of Corkbeg and Lisquinlan, appointed 3 November 1798, resigned 1807
- William Moore-Hodder of Hoddersfield, appointed 1 March 1831, died 20 November 1859,

Honorary Colonels

- Edmond Roche, 1st Baron Fermoy, appointed 27 September 1871, died 17 September 1874
- Hayes St Leger, 4th Viscount Doneraile, appointed 25 November 1874, died 26 August 1887
- Brevet Col Richard Aldworth, former CO, appointed 14 January 1888
- Sir Robert Uniacke-Penrose-Fitzgerald, 1st Baronet of Lisquinlan and Corkbeg, MP, appointed 8 March 1899

Lieutenant-colonels (Commanding officers after November 1859)

- William Moore-Hodder of Hoddersfield (father of above) 15 January 1799
- William T. French, 3 February 1832
- William St Leger Alcock Stawell of Kilbrittain Castle, formerly 23rd Foot and Lt-Col South Cork Light Infantry (18 April 1848), transferred 8 November 1854.
- Brevet Col Richard Aldworth, formerly Royal Fusiliers, promoted 29 October 1873, later Hon Col
- H. Coughlan, promoted 2 April 1887
- William Cooke-Collis, CMG, formerly Royal Irish Rifles, promoted 12 December 1894
- William Stopford, promoted 1 August 1907, to disbandment

=== Battle honour ===
The regiment was awarded the battle honour South Africa 1900–01
