= Battle of Kilcumney Hill =

Battle during the Irish Rebellion of 1798

- Part of The Irish Rebellion of 1798
- Monument commemorating the battle.
Date	26 June 1798
Location	Kilcumney Hill, near Goresbridge, County Carlow, Ireland
Result	British Victory • end of the rebellion in County Carlow • execution of John Murphy shortly after

Belligerents
United Irishmen	(Kingdom of Great Britain) Great Britain

Commanders and leaders
John Murphy (executed); Myles Byrne	(Kingdom of Great Britain) Charles Asgill (Kingdom of Great Britain) Gerard Lake

Strength
Unknown	c. 1,500

Casualties and losses
Unknown, probably few	Minimal
- c. 140 civilians killed

the Battle of Kilcumney Hill took place on 26 June 1798 during the Irish Rebellion of 1798 and marked the final defeat of the rebels under Father John Murphy during the rebellion.

== Background ==
after the defeat of the rebels at the Battle of Vinegar Hill in County Wexford on 21 June, a number of rebel columns split up in an attempt to spread the rebellion into the surrounding counties. One of these columns, lead by the charismatic Father John Murphy of Boolavouge and the 18 year old Myles Byrne, marched into County Carlow on 25 June after a failed attempt to stir up rebellion in county Kildare, and set up camp on the summit of Kilcumney Hill, right next to the border between Carlow and Kildare.

== The battle ==
A British Force under Sir Charles Asgill had been pursuing the rebels for a number of days and due to a thick fog had been able to surround the rebels at their camp on the hill without being spotted.

Plaque describing the battle.

On the morning of 26 June the British began an artillery bombardment on the camp, and panic quickly spread throughout the rebel ranks. Murphy and Byrne were able to regain control of their men and according to a local monument made a desperate last stand on the hill for about an hour before Murphy gave the order to retreat towards Scollagh Gap where they were then harassed by General Lake’s cavalry.

== Aftermath ==
Much of the rebel force was separated upon being pursued by the British Cavalry. Father John Murphy and his bodyguard James Gallagher were separated from a surviving force they had fled with and spent the next number of days hiding with the help of sympathetic civilians until eventually being captured by a group of Yeomen in a farmyard on 2 July. They were both charged with committing high treason and both were executed later that day. Their heads placed on spikes as a warning to other rebels.

Myles Byrne, who had retreated with another column, eventually joined Michael Dwyer and Joseph Holt in the Wicklow Mountains, participating in a guerrilla campaign against British forces (1798-1803). After the failure of the Irish Rebellion of 1803, Byrne fled to France and would later serve in Napoleon’s Irish Legion.
