= Boolavogue (song) =

Irish ballad

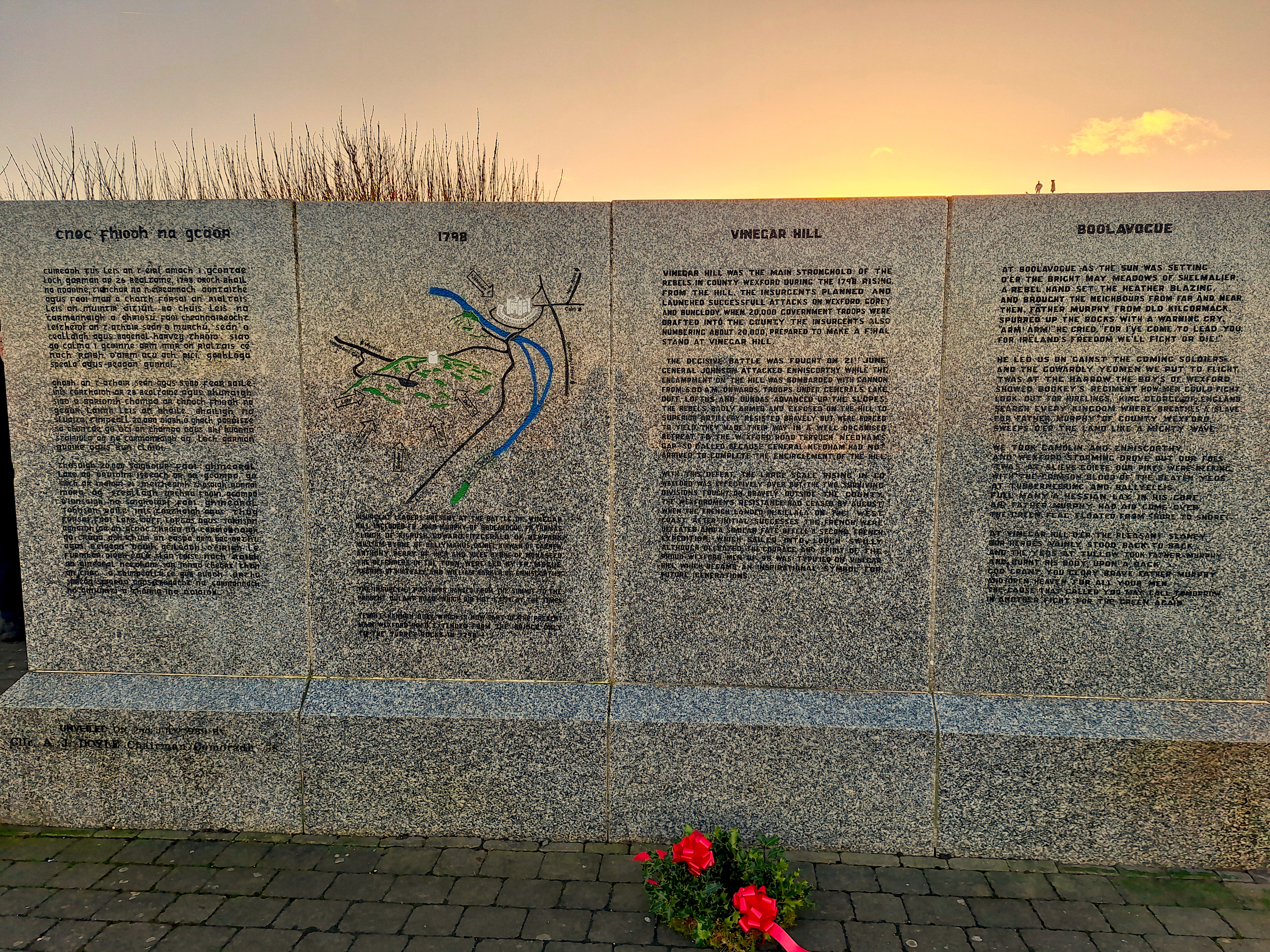
Memorial at Vinegar Hill, with "Boolavogue" lyrics at right.

"Boolavogue" is an Irish ballad commemorating the campaign of Father John Murphy and his army in County Wexford during the Irish Rebellion of 1798. It was composed by Patrick Joseph McCall in 1898, the centenary of the Rebellion.

== Topic ==
The ballad covers the victories of Father John Murphy of the village of Boolavogue in County Wexford as he led his parishioners in routing the Camolin Cavalry on 26 May 1798 before scoring further victories at the battles of Oulart Hill and Enniscorthy. Wexford insurgents fought well against government troops but were eventually defeated at the Battle of Vinegar Hill on 21 June. Father Murphy and the other leaders were hanged.

Father Murphy was a priest who at first tried to persuade people not to take part in the rebellion. He changed his opinion and became a reluctant rebel leader after government soldiers burned down the homes of his parishioners whom they suspected of rebellion. Lieutenant Thomas Bookey whose 'regiment' is mentioned in the song was the leader of the Yeoman Cavalry in the Boolavogue area.

== Music ==
McCall, who also composed the popular ballads "Kelly the Boy from Killanne" and "Follow Me up to Carlow", wrote "Boolavogue" to the old air "Eochaill" (in English, "Youghal Harbour"). The tune had previously been borrowed for the Irish/Australian traditional song "Moreton Bay" (1830), about an Irish convict's brutal treatment in Australia, and would later be used by Seán Ó Riada as part of the film score for Mise Éire (1959). McCall may have collaborated with Arthur Warren Darley in the composition of the song. The song was inspired by songs contemporary to the events of 1798 such as "Come All You Warriors".

Liam Gaul states that "Boolavogue" is the song most closely associated with PJ McCall, and has become an anthem for Wexford. Gaul notes that "Boolavogue" was not published in any of McCall's literary works, and was first printed in the Irish Independent on 18 June 1898 under the title Fr Murphy of the County Wexford. This title was still being used when it appeared in the 1922 edition of Padraig Breathnach's Songs of the Gael. It was only later that the song became widely known as "Boolavogue".

McCall was from Dublin, but often visited Wexford, and was familiar with its history and geography. "Boolavogue" contains references to people and places that played a major part in the 1798 Rising.
