= Come All You Warriors =

Ballad

"Come All You Warriors" (also known as "Father Murphy") is a ballad concerning the 1798 Rising. The narrative focuses on the predominant figure in the Wexford Rising, Father John Murphy of the parish of Boulavogue.

The song was written within a couple of years of the Rising, and is one of the bases for "Boulavogue", written by P.J. McCall 100 years later for the centenary commemorations.

The song is referenced in the Memoirs of Joseph Holt, general of the Irish rebels in 1798, where he states:

'The fragments of a popular song of this period, which I picked up last summer (1836) in a tour through the county of Wexford asserts that

At the Windmill hills, and at Enniscorthy,
The British fencibles they ran like deers,
But our ranks were scattered and sorely battered,
For the want of Kyan and his Shelmaliers.'

== Recordings ==
- The song was recorded twice by Frank Harte on the albums Dublin Street Songs / Through Dublin City and 1798, The First Year of Liberty.
- It is sung by Jerry O'Reilly on the album The Croppy's Complaint
- A slightly different version with alternate first verse was sung by Phil Berry on the albums Father and Son and Wexford Ballads 1798, which also contains other songs of the Rising.

== See also ==
- Traditional Irish Singers
- Frank Harte
- List of Irish ballads
