= Myles Byrne =

Irish rebel

Miles Byrne
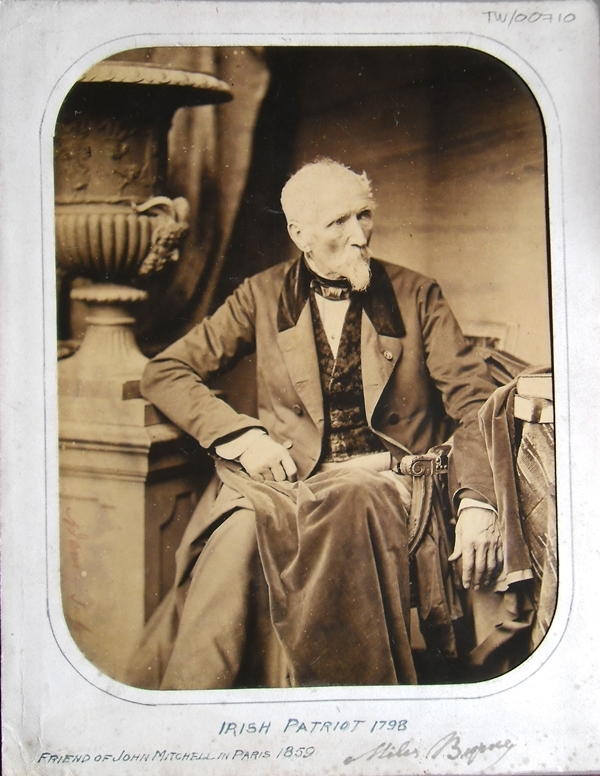
- Born: 20 March 1780; Ballylusk, County Wexford, Ireland.
- Died: 24 January 1862 (aged 81); Rue Montaigne, Paris, France.
- Resting place: Montmartre Cemetery, Paris.
- Occupation: Soldier.
- Political party: United Irishmen
- Spouse: Fanny Horner (M. 1835)
- Military career
- Allegiance: United Irishmen; French First Republic first French Empire; Bourbon France
- Service years: 1803-1804 (French First Republic); 1804-1814 (First French Empire); 1828-1835 (Bourbon France)
- Rank: Général de brigade (Napoleonic France; Chef de brigade (Bourbon France)
- Conflicts: Irish Rebellion of 1798; Battle of Tubberneering; Battle of Arklow; Battle of Vinegar Hill; Battle of Kilcumney Hill; Irish Rebellion of 1803; Napoleonic Wars; Peninsular War; Dos de Mayo Uprising; Siege of Astorga; siege of Ciudad Rodrigo; Siege of Almeida; Battle of Bussaco; battle of Fuentes de Oñoro; War of the sixth coalition; Battle of Bautzen; Combat of Goldberg; battle of Leipzig; Greek War of Independence; Morea Expedition

Myles (or Miles) Byrne (20 March 1780 – 24 January 1862) was an Irish rebel leader. He played a role during Wexford in the Irish Rebellion of 1798 and as a fighter in the continued guerrilla struggle against British Crown forces in the Wicklow Hills until 1802. In 1803 collaborated closely with Robert Emmet in plans for a renewed insurrection in Dublin. After these misfired, he took a commission in Napoleon's Irish Legion, seeing action in the Low Countries, Spain and at the Battle of Leipzig. Under the Bourbon Restoration he was deployed to Greece, and retired as a chef de bataillon. In his later years, he was the Paris correspondent for the Young Irelander paper The Nation, and dictated his memoirs. In these, he advanced the image of the United Irishmen as a cohesive revolutionary organisation dedicated to the achievement of a national democratic government.

== Early life ==
Myles (he usually spelt his name Miles) Byrne was born in the townland of Ballylusk near Monaseed, County Wexford, Ireland, on 20 March 1780, into a Catholic farming family.

== 1798 Rebellion ==
At the age of 17 Byrne was asked to join the government Yeomanry. He chose instead to join the Society of United Irish. In defiance of the British Crown and the Protestant Ascendancy the oath-bound movement was determined to achieve an independent and representative government for Ireland. He participated in preparations in Wexford for the 1798 Rebellion, and at the age of 18 fought at the Battle of Tubberneeing on 4 June and, in command of a division of pikemen, in the attack on Arklow (9 June) in which the rebel leader Father Michael Murphy was killed. In the face of a general rout, he led a rebel charge in the Battle of Vinegar Hill (21 June), in the defence a position he considered impossibly exposed and a measure of the profoundly misguided strategy of the rebel leadership.

Keeping command of a small band, Byrne seized Goresbridge (23 June) but had to deplore the murder of several prisoners and other atrocities committed by his men in revenge for the torture and executions that had been visited upon the peasantry by the yeomanry and government militia. After further skirmishes, he joined Joseph Holt and Michael Dwyer in taking to the Wicklow Hills to continue a guerrilla resistance. The failure of General Humbert in Connacht to take the same course with his expeditionary force in August – to take to the mountains and await renewed rebel mobilisation and reinforcement – and to seek open battle with the "English army", he attributed to the French commander's vanity.

After Holt accepted terms (transportation to Australia) in November, Byrne, assisted by his sister, escaped to Dublin. He recalled of his sister: "If I had not remarked a long scar on her neck, she would not have mentioned anything herself. A yeoman ... threatened to cut her throat with his sabre if she did not tell instantly the place in which I was hiding. The cowardly villain, no doubt, would have put his threat in execution had not some of his comrades interfered to prevent him".

== Rising of 1803 ==
In the winter of 1802-03 Byrne entered into the plans of Robert Emmet and Anne Devlin for a renewed uprising. In his Memoirs, Byrne describes a meeting he arranged between Robert Emmet and the Wexford rebel leader Thomas Cloney at Harold's Cross Green, Dublin, just prior to Emmet's Rebellion: "I can never forget the impression this meeting made on me at the time – to see two heroic patriots, equally devoted to poor Ireland, discussing the best means of obtaining her freedom".

In July 1803, the plans unravelled when Michael Dwyer (Devlin's cousin), still holding out in Wicklow, recognised that there were neither the promised arms nor convincing proof of an intended French landing. In the north Thomas Russell and James Hope found no enthusiasm for a renewal of the struggle in what in '98 had been the strongest United Irish and Catholic Defender districts.

In Dublin, with their preparations revealed by an accidental explosion of a rebel arms depot, Emmet proceeded with a plan to seize the centres of government. The rising, for which Byrne turned out with Emmet and Malachy Delaney in gold-trimmed green uniforms, was broken up after a brief confrontation in Thomas Street. Unaware that John Allen was approaching with a band, according to one witness, of 300, Emmet ordered what R.R. Madden recorded as "a motley assemblage of [80] armed men ... under the evident excitement of drink" to disperse.

== In the service of France ==
Two days after the fight in Thomas Street, Byrne met with the fugitive Emmet and agreed to go to Paris to procure French assistance. But in Paris, he found Napoleon's attentions (as in 1798) focussed elsewhere. The First Consul used a cessation of hostilities with Britain to pursue a very different venture, the re-enslavement of Haiti.

Byrne was commissioned as a captain in Napoleon's Irish Legion. But at a time when Byrne was convinced that "all Catholic Ireland" was "ready to rise the moment a rallying point was offered", the Irish exiles (Thomas Addis Emmet and Arthur O'Connor chief among them) could not deflect the First Consul from other priorities. Rather than in Ireland, with his diminishing Irish contingent, Byrne was to see action in the Low Countries, Germany and Spain.

Byrne rose to the rank of brigadier general and was awarded the Legion of Honour in 1813. Following the Bourbon Restoration, with fellow legionnaire John Allen, Byrne narrowly avoided deportation as a foreign Bonapartist. An introduction to the Prince de Broglie, then vice-president of the Chamber of Deputies and two audiences with the Minister of War, Marshal Henri Clarke, the Duke of Feltre, (a son of Irish parents, who had advised Wolfe Tone) contributed to the latter's decision to quash the deportation order. In August 1817 Byrne was naturalised as a French citizen.

For much of the next decade, Byrne found himself effectively retired on half pay. Returned to active military service in 1828, he distinguished himself in the French expedition to Morea (as did his fellow United Irishman, William Corbet) during the Greek War of Independence. He had greatly admired Byron who died in 1824 having survived the second siege of Missalonghi.

In his memoirs, Byrne dwelt upon the role of atrocity and reprisal in the Greek war, and suggested that the Ottomans' Egyptian commander, Ibrahim Pasha, had been as ruthless in this respect as General Cornwallis in Ireland. Byrne ended the war in 1830 as commander of Morea castle, and in 1835 retired in France with the rank of Chef de Bataillion.

== Memoirs ==
In the 1840s, Byrne was Paris correspondent for The Nation in Dublin, the Young Irelander paper that under the early direction of Thomas David did much to rehabilitate the memory of the United Irishmen.

In his last years, Byrne wrote his Memoirs, which are an account both of his participation in the Irish rebellion and his time in the Irish Legion of Napoleon. These were first published in three volumes in 1863 (under the direction of his widow, Fanny), but there have been many subsequent reprints.

Byrne was relatively silent on his counter-insurgency role in Spain. Dismissing his activities in putting down the Spanish partidas as "disagreeable", he focuses his account of Legionary service on the formal soldiering of sieges and pitched battles.

Stephen Gwynn who edited and published a new edition of Byrne's Memoirs in 1907, stated in his Introduction to Volume 1: "I owe my acquaintance with these Memoirs to Mr John Dillon, who spoke of them as the best of all books dealing with Ireland; and a reading of the volumes left me inclined to agree with him".

Against the portrayal of '98 as a series of disjointed, unconnected risings, Byrne's memoirs presented the United Irishmen as a cohesive revolutionary organisation whose aim of a democratic, secular, republic had captured the allegiance of a great mass of the Irish people.

== Marriage ==
Byrne was married (1835) in Paris to a Scots Presbyterian, Frances Charles Horner (better known as Fanny), (1789 – 1876) (originally from George Square, Edinburgh, Scotland) but they had no children. Fanny's father was John Horner, a "merchant of Edinburgh", and her mother was Joanna Baillie. They were married on Christmas Eve, 24 December 1835 in the British Embassy Chapel in Paris by Matthew Luscombe, a Scottish Anglican bishop . She had three brothers and two sisters. One of her brothers was Francis Horner (1778 – 1817), a Whig MP; another, Leonard Horner (1785 – 1864), was a noted geologist.

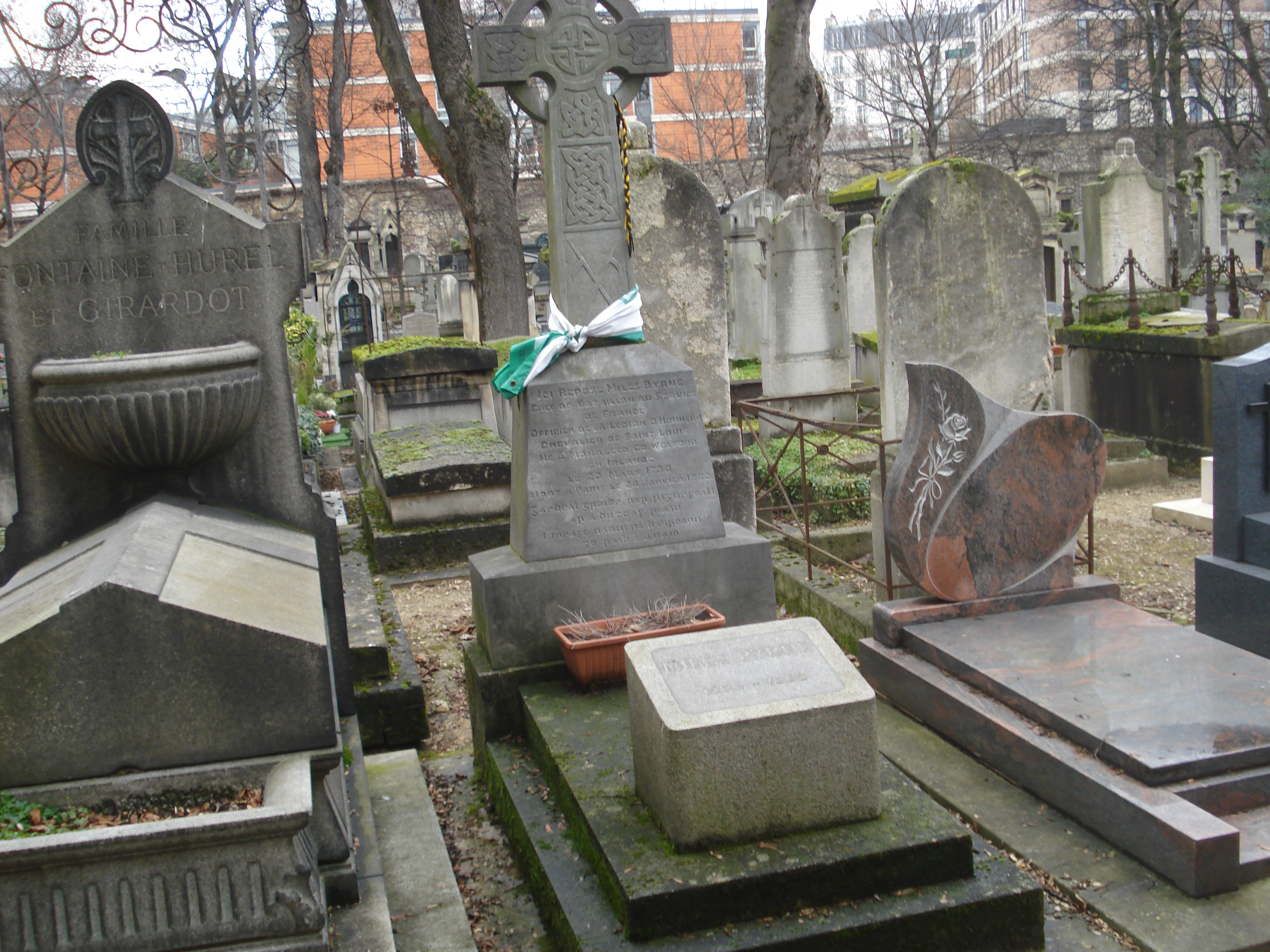
The grave in the cemetery Montmartre, 23rd division

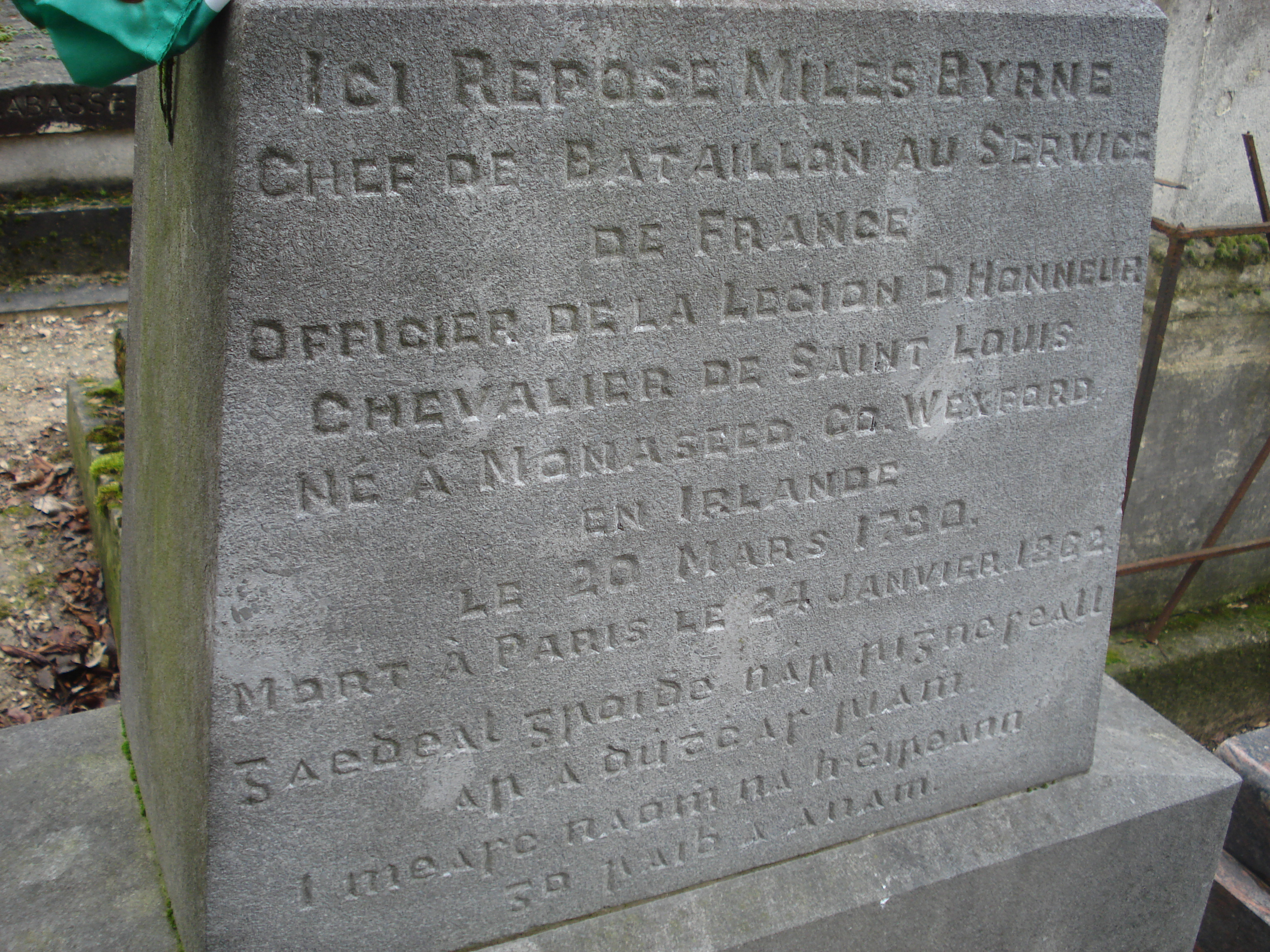
The grave in the cemetery Montmartre, 23rd division

== 1859 Photograph ==
A photograph (above) of Byrne faces page 185 in Nicholas Furlong's "Fr John Murphy of Boolavogue: 1753-1798" (Dublin, 1991). According to the author, it was taken in Paris in 1859 and was thought to be the first photograph taken of an Irishman. That distinction is probably owed to an 1844 calotype by the pioneer photographer Henry Fox Talbot of the Irish poet (and biographer of Wolfe Tone) Thomas Moore. (In 1821 Byrne had refused to attend a St Patrick's day dinner Moore had organised in Paris because of the presence of Wellesley Pole Long, a nephew of the Duke of Wellington).

The photograph of Byrne, possibly the only one of a United Irish veteran, is now in Áras an Uachtaráin, the residence of the President of Ireland, in Dublin.

John Mitchel visited Byrne when he was 80 years old and described him as "One of those rare beings who never grow old".

== Death ==
Miles Byrne died at his house in the rue Montaigne (now rue Jean Mermoz, 8th arrondissement, near Champs-Élysées), Paris on Friday 24 January 1862, and was buried in Montmartre Cemetery. His grave there is marked by a Celtic Cross – but this headstone appears to be a 1950s replacement for an earlier one. The inscription on his original headstone appears in his Memoirs; in part, it read:

SINCEREMENT ATTACHE A L'lRLANDE

SON PAYS NATAL,
IL A FIDELEMENT SERVI LA FRANCE

SA PATRIE ADOPTIVE.

('Sincerely attached to Ireland, his country of birth, he faithfully served France, his country of adoption')
