= Gregory Swanson =

American lawyer (1924–1992)

Gregory Swanson LL.B., B.A.
- Gregory Swanson "consults with the assistant dean of the law school after registering for classes on September 15, 1950."
- Born: 1924; Danville, Virginia
- Died: July 26, 1992 (aged 67–68)
- Education: Bachelor degree in Political Science from Howard University; LL.B. from Howard University School of Law; Completed two years of LL.M. work at the University of Virginia School of Law
- Occupation: Practicing attorney
- Years active: 1949 – 1984
- Employer(s): Internal Revenue Service, 1961–1984
- Known for: being the first African-American to attend the University of Virginia.

Gregory Hayes Swanson, LL.B, A.B., (born 1924 – July 26, 1992) was an American lawyer who was the first African American to attend the University of Virginia.

== Biography ==
Swanson graduated from Howard University in 1945 with a Bachelor's degree in political science and then from the Howard University School of Law in 1948 with an LL.B. (now Juris Doctor). After law school, Swanson clerked for the Richmond, Virginia law firm Hill, Martin, & Robinson and then for attorney Jerry L. Williams in Danville, Virginia.

In 1949, Swanson applied to the LL.M. program at the University of Virginia School of Law to pursue graduate work. He had recently opened his own law firm in Martinsville, Virginia, and wrote to the UVA Law Committee on Admissions that his "primary reason" for applying to the law school's LL.M. program was his "desire to teach." On January 12, 1950, the UVA law faculty voted to admit Swanson to the law school, and they sent the matter to UVA President Colgate Darden for a final decision. The University's Board of Visitors rejected Swanson's application on July 14, 1950, with the claim that his admission would violate Virginia state laws and the state constitution. Swanson filed a complaint in the U.S. District Court for the Western District of Virginia to gain admission to the law school for the fall 1950 term. The firm of Hill, Martin, & Robinson and the Virginia chapter of the NAACP, including Thurgood Marshall, served as Swanson's legal counsel. Chief Justice John J. Parker of the Fourth United States Circuit Court of Appeals, Federal District Judge John Paul, and Circuit Appeals Judge Morris A. Soper presided over the ensuing case, Swanson v. Rector & Visitors of Univ. of Va.

On September 5, 1950, the court ruled in favor of Swanson's admission to the UVA School of Law on the grounds that he was a qualified applicant and that UVA was the only institution in the state at which Swanson could pursue a graduate degree in law. Swanson registered for classes as a graduate student in the law school on September 15, 1950. This case laid the foundation for desegregation at the University of Virginia.

During his UVA Law residency, Swanson took law classes and worked closely with his advisers on the law faculty to develop a topic for his LL.M. thesis. He lived in a segregated Charlottesville, and while most law students lived close to the UVA Grounds, Swanson lived more than a mile away at the Carver Inn in the black neighborhood of Vinegar Hill. Despite facing a climate of racial prejudice at UVA, Swanson took initiative to be an active participant in University life beyond his graduate work. He attended football games and was a season ticket holder to the University's Tuesday Evening Concert Group. Swanson was a member of the University's integrated YMCA and helped organize that group's Committee for Racial Understanding. Further, under the terms of the Supreme Court's McLaurin decision, Swanson's victory in enrolling at UVA forced all UVA-sponsored events to be non-segregated, such as Ralph Bunche's prominent talk to the UVA Law Student Legal Forum in 1951.

In 1951, Swanson completed the one-year of residency that his graduate program required and returned to practicing law in Martinsville. He worked on his thesis into 1952, all while working as an attorney, but he did not submit a final paper within the two-year deadline and did not receive his LL.M. degree. In 1957, Swanson opened a law firm in Alexandria, Virginia, and in 1961, he took a position with the IRS.

Swanson retired from the IRS in 1984. He died in 1992.

In 2016, Swanson's historic court victory was commemorated with the installation of a plaque at the former courthouse, now the current downtown location of the Jefferson-Madison Regional Library.

== Sources ==
- "Gregory Swanson, first African American admitted to the University of Virginia". Encyclopedia Virginia. Virginia Foundation for the Humanities.
- "Gregory Swanson, First African-American Admitted to UVA (1950)". www.virginia.edu.
