= Mogue Kearns =

Father Mogue Kearns (Irish: Mo Aodh Óg Ó Céirín; died 12 July 1798), sometimes called Moses Kearns, was an Irish Roman Catholic priest and United Irishman executed by the British on 12 July 1798, after leading 2,000 rebel troops in Wexford.

== Biography ==
Mogue Kearns was born at Kiltealy, on the slopes of the Blackstairs Mountains, into a farming family. According to a story current in 1798, Kearns was a student in Paris at the height of the French Revolution and was hanged from a lamp post by the mob. However, the weight of his body bent the lamp post and his toes touched the ground. He was then rescued by a doctor who brought him back to consciousness.

After his ordination, was appointed curate at Balyna, on the Kildare-Meath border. He was not long in the parish when dismissed by the Bishop for associating with the secret tenant-farmer society, the Defenders, then entering into an alliance with the United Irishmen. On his return from Kildare, he took up residence in Enniscorthy. Kearns joined the Insurgents from the outset and was prominent in the first battle of Enniscorthy on 28 May.

From the camp at Vinegar Hill, Kearns led a detachment of 2,000 poorly armed insurgents northwards to attack the garrison at Bunclody. On the morning of 1 June, they halted outside the town. Kearns ignored the advice of Miles Byrne (as reported in Myles Byrne's Memoirs) to send a detachment to the Carlow road to cut off the garrison's retreat and ordered the attack to begin. The garrison retreated, but, meeting reinforcements, returned and counter-attacked. The insurgent forces suffered heavy losses and had to retreat to Enniscorthy.

After recovering from wounds, Kearns joined a large number of insurgents in Killoughrim Woods. In early July, Colonel Anthony Perry of Inch and Father Kearns led the ill-fated Wexford expedition into Meath where the main force of about 4000 was defeated in the Battle of Clonard on 11 July.

When first taken by the militia, he was reportedly tied on his horse and roped to a tree, but while his captors repaired for refreshment was rescued by a young woman. But his escape was short-lived. Captured with Perry, on 21 July, Kearns was tried, and hung, drawn and quartered at Blundell Wood outside Edenderry.

== See also ==
- Battle of Vinegar Hill
