= Battle of Enniscorthy =

Military action during the Irish Rebellion of 1798

Coordinates: 52.5019°N 6.5658°W

- Part of the Irish Rebellion
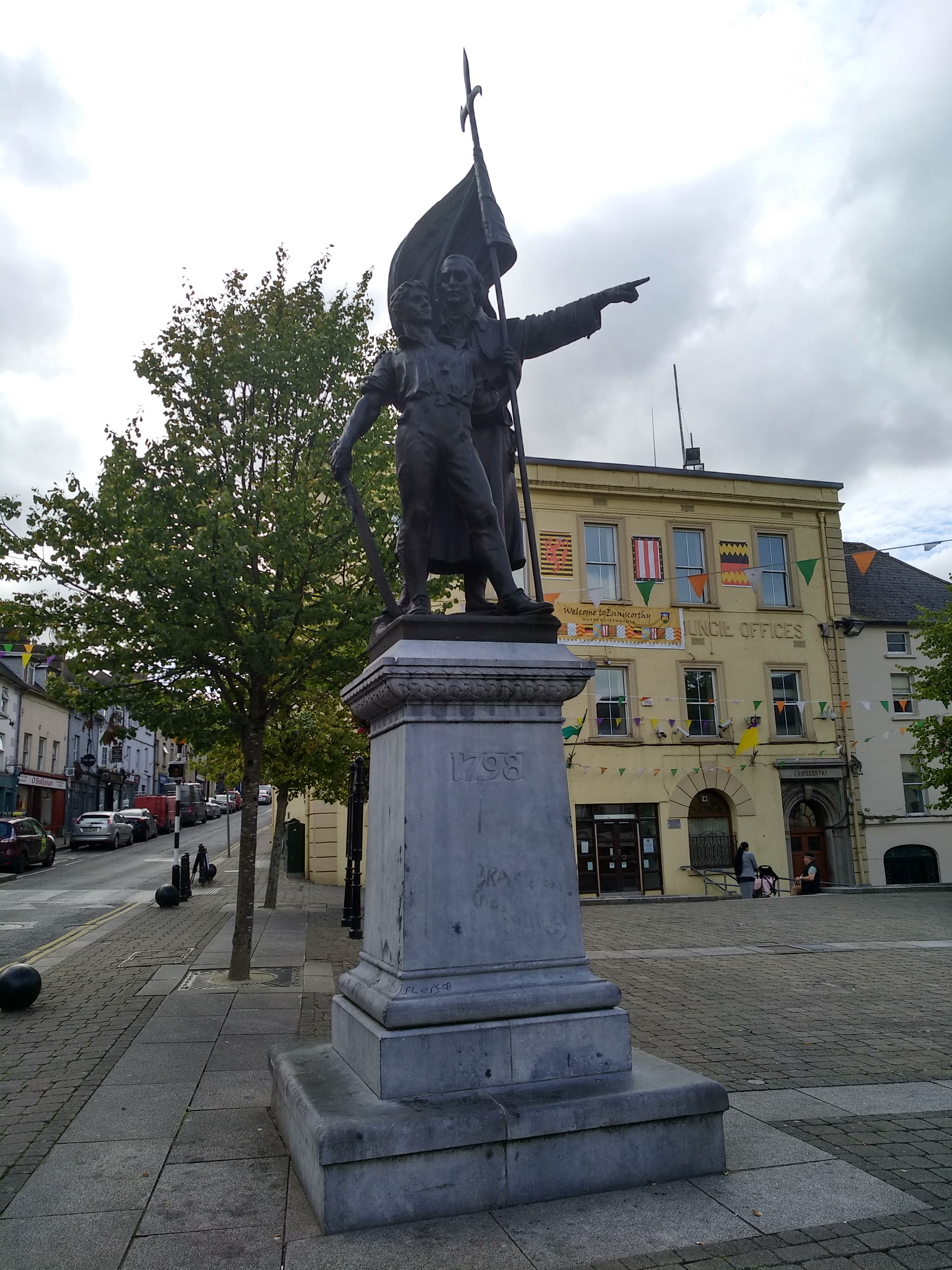
- County Wexford, 1798 Monument
Date	28 May 1798
Location	Enniscorthy, County Wexford
Result	Irish rebel victory: British abandon Enniscorthy.

Belligerents
United Irishmen	(Kingdom of Great Britain) Great Britain: (Kingdom of Ireland) British Ireland

Commanders and leaders
John Murphy; Edward Roche; Michael Murphy	Cap. Pounden †; Cap. William Snowe; Cap. De Courcy; Cap. Richards; Cap. Grogan; Cap. Cornock; Lt. Spring

Strength
5,000–7,000	331

Casualties and losses
~100–500 killed	~100 killed

The Battle of Enniscorthy was a land battle fought on 28 May 1798, during the Irish Rebellion of 1798. An overwhelming force of rebels assailed the town of Enniscorthy, County Wexford, which was defended only by a 300-strong garrison supported by loyalist civilians. On the previous day at nearby Oulart, several thousand rebels led by Father John Murphy had massacred a detachment of the North Cork militia, amounting to 110 officers and men.

== Background ==
Following the victory at Oulart Hill on Sunday 27 May, Father Murphy led his rebels to the western slopes of Carrigrew Hill, Camolin, where they camped for the night. On the morning of 28 May 1798 the rebels departed their encampment early in the morning and marched in a circuitous route via Camolin and Ferns villages. This facilitated further consolidation of rebels in the western parishes of County Wexford. This group then crossed the Slaney at the bridge of Scarawalsh, and rested on the hill of Ballyorrill, Marshalstown. This stop was to facilitate a breather and allow those behind to catch up. Further pikemen joined the rebels here from the parishes on the west bank of the Slaney.

== Battle ==
The attack on Enniscorthy began at about 1 p.m. All the town's defences were drawn up outside the Duffry Gate, where several roads converged on the town, on the western approach. Only Captain Snowe's Company of the North Cork Militia remained within the town, where they held the stone bridge over the Slaney. The initial approach to the town by the rebels consisted of a 200 strong corps of men armed with muskets, who proceeded down the centre, flanked each side by a corps of pikes. This attack was driven back by sustained army and loyalist musket fire and by the Yeoman Cavalry, forcing the rebels to hide behind the ditches. At this moment is it suggested that Fr. John Murphy recommended that the cattle being herded at the rear be brought forward, and used in place of a heavy cavalry charge. Miles Byrne suggests that "…thirty or forty of the youngest and wildest of the cattle brought from the rear of his column, goaded on by some hundreds of brave, decided pikemen…" rushed at the lines of infantry outside the Duffry Gate. This coincided with rebels within the suburbs of the town setting fire to thatched houses, creating great concern within the defenders ranks, and a retreat into the town's streets. After sustained house to house fighting, the troops defending the gate withdrew to a stone bridge over the River Slaney. A determined defence lasted for about three hours, the loyalist forces had expended their ammunition. Meanwhile at the bridge, a young rebel leader, Thomas Synnott, had waded across the Slaney at Blackstoops, above the town, and had put in a serious fight against the North Corks at the bridge. After having driven all the rebels out of town they were ordered to abandon the town and withdraw to Wexford, which they did alongside a terrified multitude of men, women and children fleeing the burning town. In the action, the garrison and yeomanry had killed up to 500 insurgents at a cost of 90 of their own dead.

== Aftermath ==
According to the historian Maxwell, the town's Protestants saw a merciless night attack as almost certain. Throughout the fight, Catholic residents had been supporting the rebels by shooting loyalists from their windows. Of the many fugitives, the weakest were carried on cavalry horses or otherwise abandoned to their fate, including infants and the elderly.

The rebels were brutal and vengeful in occupying their captured town. They were setting up a formidable encampment of 10,000 men on the nearby heights of Vinegar Hill and were able to roster forces to garrison Enniscorthy, whose streets were littered with dead and dying while flames continued to rage. 478 dwelling houses were destroyed in addition to commercial premises.

== Sources ==
- Dickson, Charles. The Wexford Rising in 1798. Its Causes and its Course. 1955.
- Gordon, James B. "History of the Rebellion in Ireland in the year 1798, &c." London, 1803.
- Gwynn, Stephen (ed.). "Memoirs of Miles Byrne - edited by his Widow", 2 vols. Dublin & London, 1907.
