= John Murphy (priest) =

Priest and rebel leader in the 1798 Irish Rebellion

Father John Murphy
- Seán Ó Murchú
- Mid-19th century portrait from a contemporary black and white sketch
- Born: c. 1753; Tincurry, Ferns, County Wexford, Ireland
- Died: 2 July 1798 (age about 45); Tullow, County Carlow, Ireland
- Cause of death: Execution by hanging
- Burial place: Body burned; some remains said to have been buried in the grounds of Ferns Cathedral; 52°35′21″N 6°29′35″W
- Alma mater: Studied with Dominicans in Seville
- Military career
- Allegiance: Society of United Irishmen
- Branch: Wexford rebels
- Service years: 1798
- Rank: Informal commander
- Commands: Wexford rebels
- Conflicts: Irish Rebellion of 1798; Battle of the Harrow; Battle of Oulart Hill; Battle of Enniscorthy; Battle of Tubberneering; Battle of Arklow; Battle of Vinegar Hill; Battle of Kilcumney Hill (executed)
- Other work: Catholic priest

John Murphy (c. 1753 – c. 2 July 1798) was an Irish Roman Catholic priest of the Roman Catholic Diocese of Ferns, who is mainly remembered for his central role in the Irish Rebellion of 1798 in County Wexford, which is sometimes known as the Wexford Rebellion. He led the rebels to one of their initial victories over a government militia at Oulart Hill, and in the following weeks became one of the rebellion's main leaders.

Following the suppression of the rebellion Murphy was taken in early July near Tullow and summarily executed.

== Early life ==
Murphy was born in Tincurry, Ferns, County Wexford, circa 1753. He was one of six children of Thomas Murphy, a relatively prosperous farmer and bacon-curer, and Johanna (née Whitty), of Tomgarrow.

He received some early education at a hedge school run by a man called Mairtin Gunn; showing aptitude for Latin and Greek he was then tutored by his Jesuit parish priest, Andrew Cassin, with a view to entering the priesthood.

Until relaxation of the penal laws in the late 18th century, seminaries were illegal in Ireland, requiring priests to complete their training abroad. By 1779, then aged about 26, Murphy had completed his initial training and was ordained by the Bishop of Ferns, Rt.-Rev. Nicholas Sweetman (1700–86) at the Catholic chapel in the High Street, Wexford. Bishop Sweetman, a probable Jacobite sympathiser who had been arrested in 1751 on political grounds, chose the Dominican college in Seville, Spain for Murphy to complete his theological studies. Murphy remained in Spain until graduation in March 1785; his diploma recorded him as a diligent and conscientious, rather than outstanding, student.

On his return to Ireland Murphy was assigned to the vacant curacy of Kilcormuck, more usually known as Boolavogue, in Monageer parish, under parish priest Patrick Cogley. He was given lodgings with a tenant farmer, John Donohue, at Tomnaboley close to Boolavogue chapel: Donohue allowed Murphy to supplement his small curate's income by keeping two or three cows.

By the time of the events of 1798, Murphy had served as curate for several years. He seems to have had a poor relationship with Sweetman's successor, Bishop James Caulfield, which may have prevented his promotion to parish priest. A contemporary description by Musgrave said that Murphy was then "about forty-five years old, light complexioned, bald-pated, and about five feet nine inches high [...] uniting strength with agility".

== The 1798 rebellion: background ==
The 1798 rebellion was principally organised by the Society of United Irishmen, a group of political reformers and radicals based in Belfast and Dublin and originally founded in 1791 by William Drennan. Inspired by the success of the American Revolution, the United Irishmen first agitated for non-violent political reform, greater independence for the Parliament of Ireland in Dublin, and Catholic emancipation: but over the 1790s their programme shifted from nonviolent activism to Irish republicanism and violent revolution. The organisation was banned in 1793, but continued to develop plans for a Nationwide uprising backed by the Government and military of the French First Republic.

Meanwhile, the still semi-underground Hierarchy of the Catholic Church in Ireland was horrified by the prospect of a French-backed Irish revolution. Firstly, the French First Republic was known to be responsible for the Civil Constitution of the Clergy, the September Massacres, the Reign of Terror, and the dechristianization of France. Secondly, the British government was granting political asylum to large numbers of French Catholics fleeing from religious persecution in France, including priests, monks and nuns. Thirdly, while King George III was determined to block complete Catholic Emancipation, William Pitt the Younger, Edmund Burke, and many other British statesmen were pushing for the end to the Penal laws against Irish Catholics. For all of these reasons, the Catholic bishops in Ireland were understandably afraid that the solution advocated by the United Irishmen would prove far worse than any of the problems they meant to solve.

In Wexford, Murphy's bishop, Caulfield, had reversed the anti-government stance of his predecessor Sweetman and was particularly concerned that his congregations would become drawn into political dissent. By 1797 the situation was particularly acute in Wexford, where hardship caused by fluctuations in grain prices became an extremely powerful United Irishmen recruiting tool. In the late spring of 1798, a violent government counter-insurgency campaign directed at the United Irishmen had spread to the county. When combined with rumours of a plot by the Orange Order to systematically massacre Irish Catholics, this created a "wave of hysteria" among the rural peasantry.

In association with the local magistrates, Bishop Caulfield asked his parish priests to sign and read out a declaration of loyalty. In Monageer parish Cogley was happy to comply, taking no part in later events, but Caulfield later characterised Murphy as "giddy", claiming he had often been locally "reprimanded and threatened". Several of Murphy's relatives had links with the United Irishmen, as did his landlord Donohue. Throughout the spring of 1798 Murphy appears to have wavered between sympathy with and rejection of the United Irishmen; on Easter Sunday (8 April 1798) he refused to administer Communion to those of his parishioners who refused to abjure the United Irishmen's oath and on 8 April, under pressure from district magistrate Mountnorris of Camolin, he signed a declaration of loyalty as curate.

== The rising in County Wexford ==
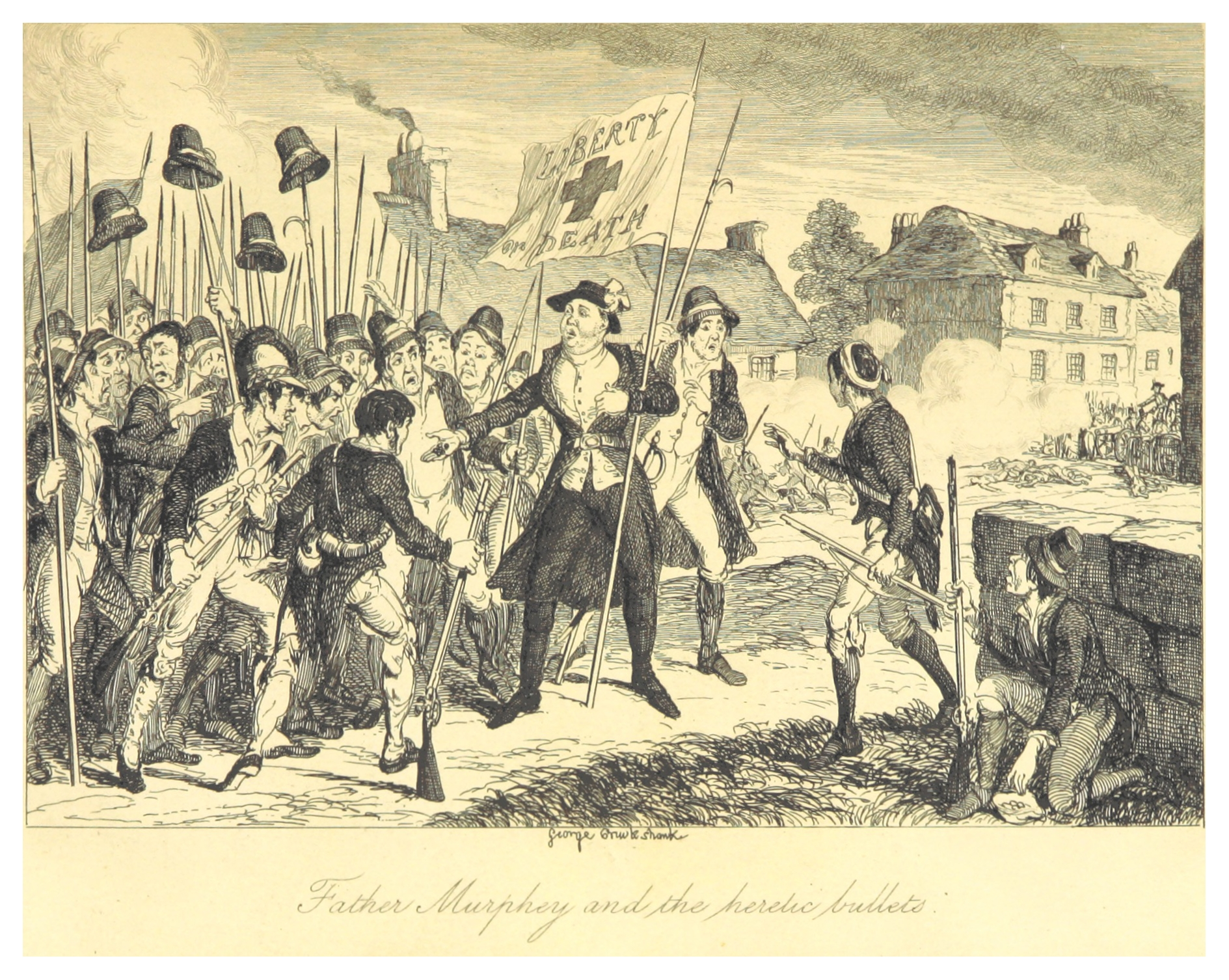
Depiction of Father Murphy (centre) leading the rebels at the Battle of Arklow. by George Cruikshank, with negatively stereotyped rebels.

On the afternoon of 26 May 1798, news of two events reached north Wexford: the first was a massacre of suspected United Irishmen by loyalists at Carnew and by the garrison at Dunlavin; this seemed to verify rumours circulating in the previous months of a plot to kill Catholics. The second was news of a United Irish rising at Naas, Carlow, and in much of County Kildare. Approached by his parishioners, at this point, Murphy appears to have agreed to commit to leading resistance locally.

=== Oulart Hill ===
On the evening of the 28th, a patrol of some twenty cavalry from the Camolin Yeomanry had been sent to investigate a report of an attack on the house of a Mrs Piper at Tincurry near Scarawalsh, in which her son-in-law was killed; they found the road blocked at the townland of the Harrow by a group of farmers armed with pikes. After an attempt to confront them two yeomen, lieutenant Thomas Bookey and John Donovan, were knocked down and killed. The remainder rode back to Ferns following which groups of yeomanry left there and Enniscorthy determined to shoot anyone they deemed responsible.

Murphy sent one party to raid the house of Mountnorris at Camolin for arms; another raided and burned Bookey's house at Rockspring, while a third raided the house of Mr Burrowes, a clergyman at Oulart, killing him and six other loyalist residents. During the night a number of houses were burned by rebels and up to 170 across the county by the yeomanry, including Murphy's own chapel: many loyalist civilians fled to the towns.

Detachments of militia from the garrisons at Arklow and Wexford were now converging on the rebels. Murphy collected his supporters at Oulart Hill, accompanied by terrified local peasantry who joined them for protection; they were also joined by Edward Roche and Morgan Byrne, two sympathetic yeomanry officers. Surrounded and attacked by a detachment of 110 men from the North Cork Militia under Col. Foote, Murphy, Roche and Byrne organised their followers, and, in the ensuing Battle of Oulart Hill, all but five of the militia were killed. A participant on the rebel side, Peter Foley, later recalled that "we were all novices in the art of war", adding that although the nominated leader, Murphy "was of little use to us" and there was "no commander".

=== Enniscorthy and Vinegar Hill ===
"Father Murphy's flag" carried by rebels at the battle of Arklow

The victory was followed by a successful assault on the weak garrison of Enniscorthy, which swelled the Irish rebel forces and their weapon supply. However defeats at New Ross, Arklow, and Newtownbarry meant a loss of men and weapons. Father John Murphy had returned to the headquarters of the rebellion at Vinegar Hill before the Battle of Arklow and was attempting to reinforce its defences. 20,000 government troops arrived at Wexford with artillery and defeated the rebels, armed only with pikes (in the Battle of New Ross one man was armed with a Bronze Age sword) at the Battle of Vinegar Hill on 21 June. However, due to a lack of coordination among the government columns, the bulk of the rebel army escaped to fight on.

== Death ==
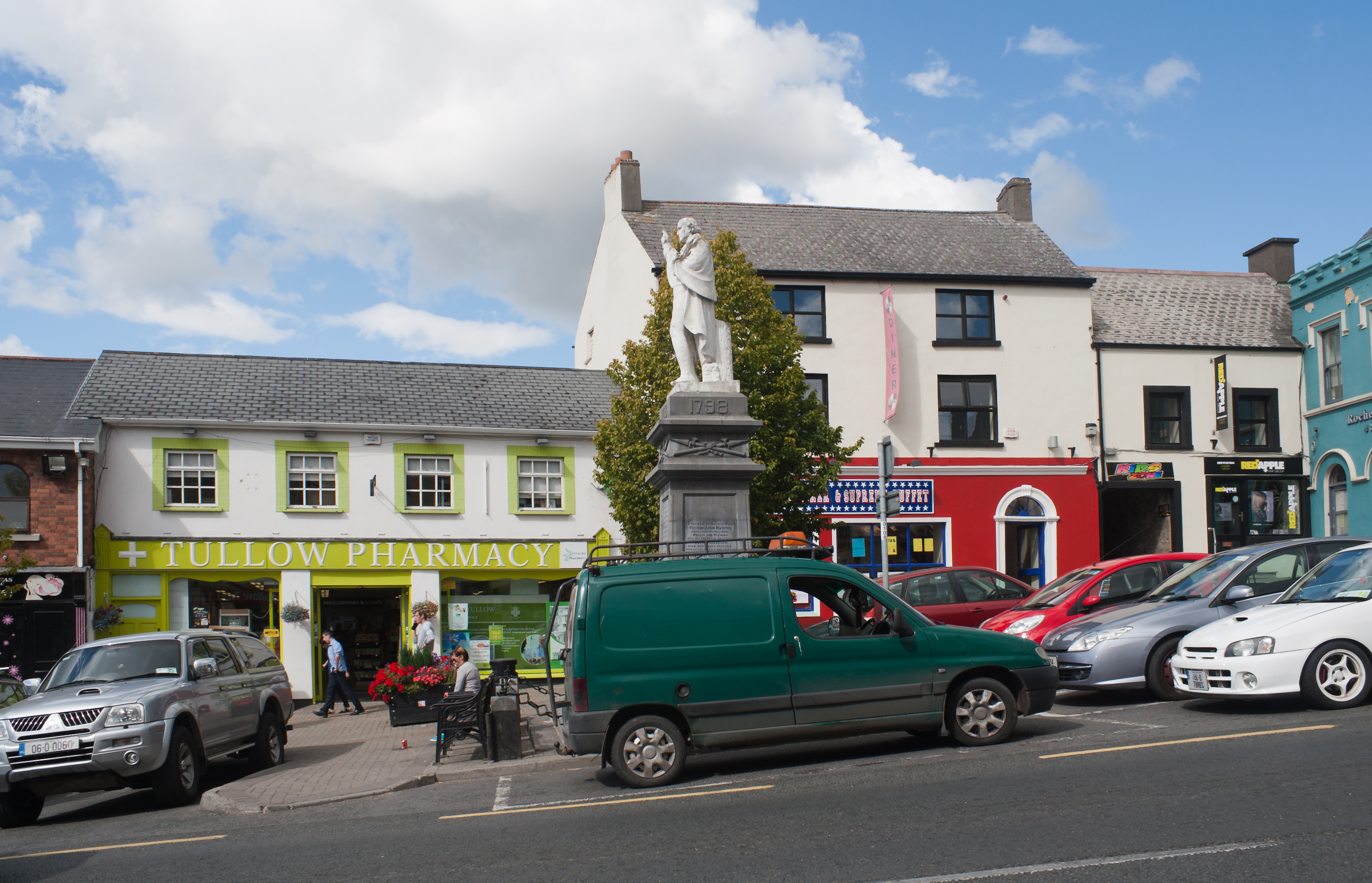
Market Square in Tullow with a monument dedicated to John Murphy who was executed at this square on 2 July 1798

Eluding the crown forces by passing through the Scullogue Gap, Fr. John Murphy and other leaders tried to spread the rebellion across the country by marching into Kilkenny and towards the midlands. On 26 June 1798 at the Battle of Kilcumney Hill in County Carlow, their forces were tricked and defeated. Murphy and his bodyguard, James Gallagher, became separated from the main surviving group (fragments of which fought for six more years from the Killoughrim woods near Enniscorthy (James Corcoran) and from Wicklow mountains).

Murphy decided to head for the safety of a friend's house in Tullow, County Carlow, when the path cleared. They were sheltered by friends and strangers – one Protestant woman, asked by searching yeomen if any strangers had passed, answered "No strangers passed here today"; when she was later questioned about why she had said Murphy and Gallagher had not passed, she explained that they had not – because they were still in her house when she was questioned.

After a few days, some yeomen captured Murphy and Gallagher in a farmyard on 2 July 1798. They were brought to Tullow later that day where they were brought before a military tribunal, charged with committing treason against the Crown, and sentenced to death. Both men were tortured in an attempt to extract more information from them. Murphy was stripped, flogged, hanged, decapitated, his corpse burnt in a barrel of tar and his head impaled on a spike. This final gesture was meant to be a warning to all others who fought against the Crown.

== Legacy ==
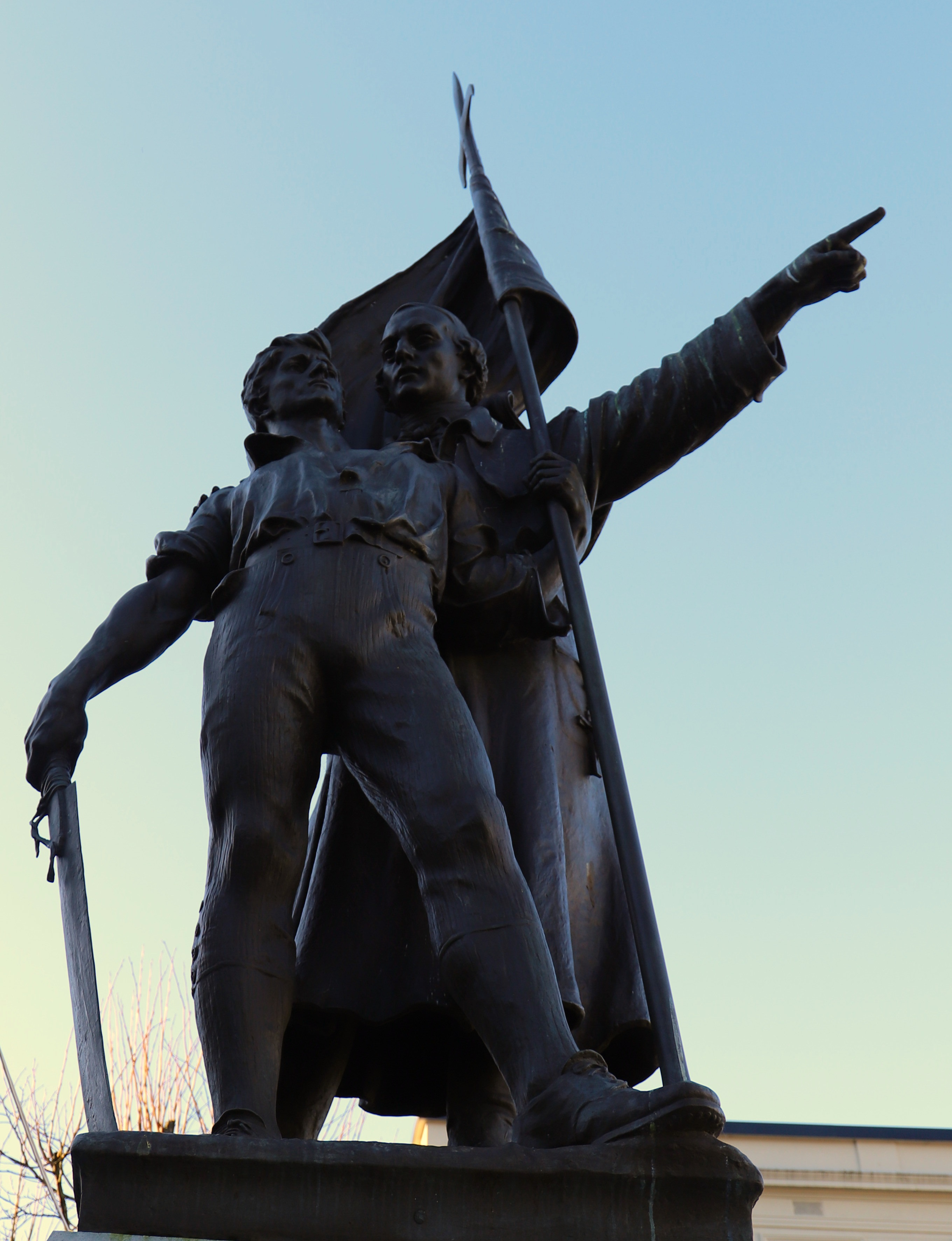
Statue in Enniscorthy of Murphy and a pikeman

A single portrait exists of Murphy, now kept at Boolavogue: this was produced in the mid-19th century by a Dublin artist based on a contemporary pencil sketch found at his lodgings in Tomnaboley after his death.

There is a statue erected to Murphy in the centre of the town in which he was captured and executed, Tullow, County Carlow. There is a basic story of his role in 1798 inscribed on the base of this statue and it may be considered the central point of the town even today.

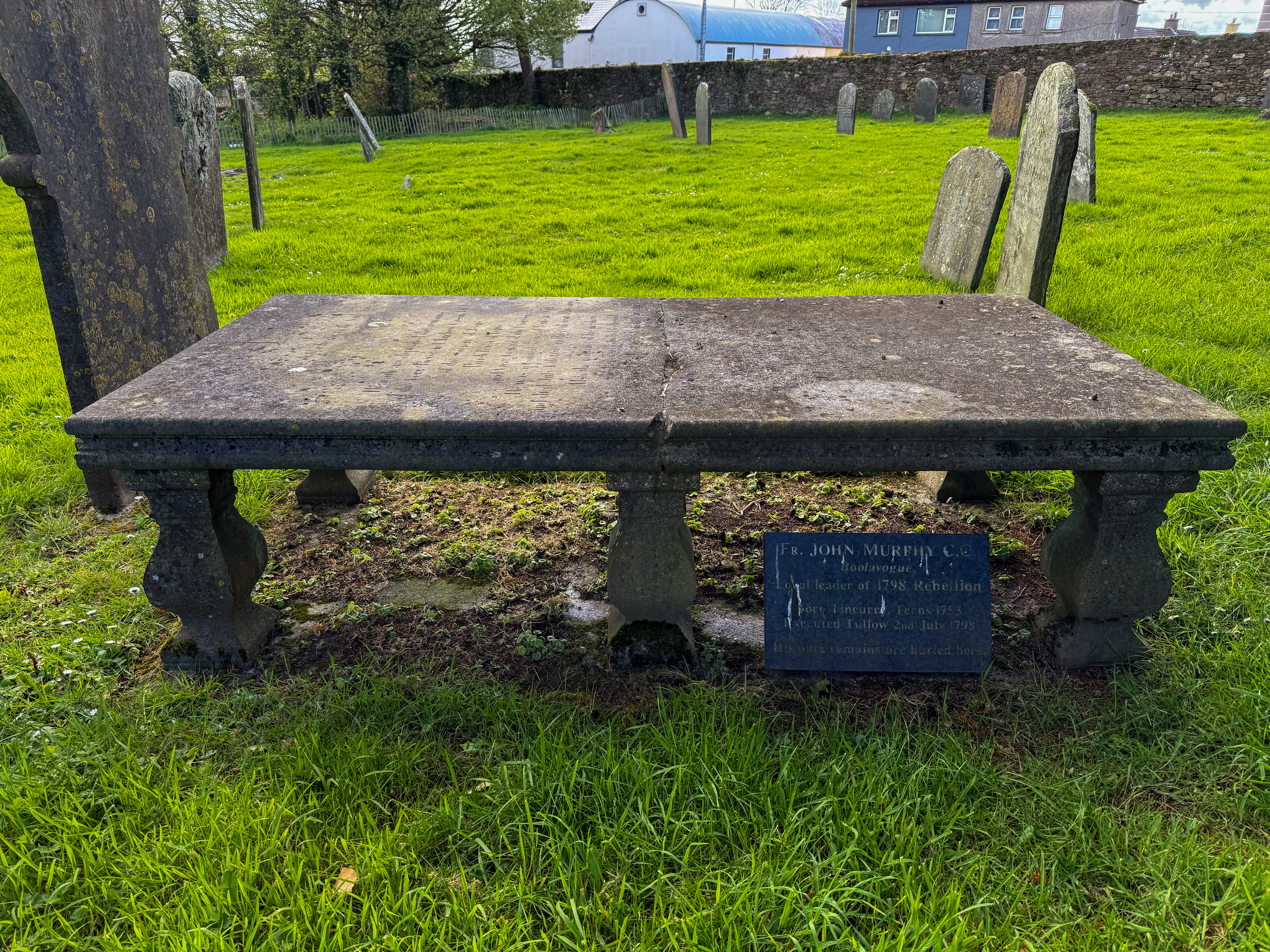
Grave of John Murphy

Murphy became one of the best-known leaders of the Wexford rising, commemorated for his leadership and for his unlikely talent for military organisation. Although ten or eleven of the 84 priests then in Ferns diocese had some involvement in the rebellion, notably Philip Roche, Mogue Kearns, Thomas Clinch, Ned Redmond, and Michael Murphy, all of whom were executed or killed in battle, later historiography gave John Murphy a "centre-stage position". This was probably influenced by the depictions in Fr. Patrick Kavanagh's Popular History of the Insurrection of 1798 and Brother Luke Cullen's account in Wexford and Wicklow Insurgents of 1798.

Later nineteenth-century histories, notably that of Fr. Kavanagh, also depicted the rebel priests as fighting for "faith and fatherland", rather than stressing their status as United Irishmen sympathisers siding with parishioners against the express orders of their bishops. Murphy was widely commemorated as "Father Murphy", and when the mid-19th century painting of him was taken for restoration before the 1798 centenary celebrations, a Roman collar was added to replace the typical late 18th century cravat he wore in the portrait.

Murphy's remains lie buried in the old Catholic graveyard at Ferns, County Wexford, alongside those of Fr. Ned Redmond.

== Cultural depictions ==
- Murphy is commemorated in several Irish rebel songs, notably the ballad Boolavogue, written by Patrick Joseph McCall in 1898.
- John Murphy is one of the main protagonists of the 2015 American musical The Guns of Ireland by Jeffrey David Payne and Mike Speegle, about the Wexford Rebellion of 1798 and the Easter Rising of 1916. Murphy is shown taking command of the Wexford rebels up to his eventual execution. Murphy is also shown later, symbolically presiding over the 1916 Kilmainham Gaol wedding ceremony of condemned war poet and Easter Rising leader Joseph Plunkett, to his fiancée, Grace Gifford.
