= Siege of Ciudad Rodrigo =

Action of the Peninsular War

Sieges of Ciudad Rodrigo are a series of sieges of the Spanish town Ciudad Rodrigo.

Specific sieges are:

- Siege of Ciudad Rodrigo (1370)
- Siege of Ciudad Rodrigo (1707)
- Siege of Ciudad Rodrigo (1810)
- Siege of Ciudad Rodrigo (1812)
