= Vinegar Hill (Charlottesville, Virginia) =

Neighborhood in Charlottesville, Virginia, U.S.

Vinegar Hill was one of the earliest neighborhoods in Charlottesville, Virginia. Originally a predominantly Irish neighborhood, located near downtown, it was bordered by West Main Street to the south, Preston Avenue to the north, and 4th Street to the west. When it was first populated by African American families in the early nineteenth century, it was called "Random Row." George Toole, a local Irish-American resident, began calling it Vinegar Hill to memorialize the Battle of Vinegar Hill. It was incorporated into the city in 1835. Vinegar Hill is remembered now for the city of Charlottesville's invasive urban renewal project begun in 1964 that razed the majority black neighborhood.

== African American community ==
After the Civil War, the neighborhood became a thriving center of Charlottesville's African American community. In the decades when the city remained segregated, black-owned businesses in Vinegar Hill served the needs of Charlottesville's black community and some white customers. Although many of the structures in the neighborhood were rented to the mostly black community by white property owners, more than a quarter of the homes and business properties were black owned. Most Vinegar Hill residents lived without basic amenities like running water, plumbing, or electric. The city of Charlottesville's health council did not feel they had adequate power to enforce the standing city code that required each home to have these amenities in every home, including those in Vinegar Hill.

== Razing and redevelopment ==
In 1965, the entire neighborhood was razed as part of an urban renewal plan initiated in the 1950s. By a margin of 36 votes, the city of Charlottesville voted to raze Vinegar Hill in a referendum. This occurred in a time where the poll tax excluded many black residents from voting. One church, thirty businesses, and 158 families were displaced, almost all African American. Six hundred community members were moved into the Westhaven public housing complex. Families who had lived in stand-alone houses now resided in multi-family complexes. The site remained vacant for well over a decade, and it was not until 1985 that a redevelopment project was put in place and the Omni Hotel and surrounding development installed on the neighborhood's site.

Leading up to and following the "Unite the Right Rally" on August 12, 2017, Vinegar Hill's destruction was a central topic of national coverage of Charlottesville's history. In June 2017, Slate published an opinion on the relationship between Vinegar Hill's destruction and the Robert E. Lee statue in nearby Lee (now Market Street, formerly Emancipation) Park. Just three days after the rally, the website Medium posted a Timeline article about Vinegar Hill, and it was the focus of articles in the New York Times and The Atlantic on August 18.

== Memorialization ==
The names "Random Row" and "Vinegar Hill" continue to be used in the area where the neighborhood once stood. Random Row Books operated on West Main Street from 2009 to 2013, when the building was razed to make way for a hotel. Random Row Brewery opened on Preston Avenue in 2016. Vinegar Hill Shopping Center operates on Preston Avenue. There has also been a clothing line named after Vinegar Hill, named Vinegar Hill Vintage. This clothing line is also associated with the Vinegar Hill Magazine which is the only current publication of record with content that covers issues focused on issues that affect African American people in Charlottesville. The Vinegar Hill Theater, a small movie house, operated for 37 years before closing in 2016, and has since that time operated with a variant name and different mission. A historic marker telling a brief history of the neighborhood is mounted on a low wall facing Water Street on the Charlottesville Downtown Mall. In 2011, the City of Charlottesville officially apologized for razing the neighborhood.
