= Battle of Tubberneering =

Battle of the Wexford Rebellion

- Part of the United Irishmen Rebellion
Date	4 June 1798
Location	Toberanierin, County Wexford 52°38′N 6°21′W
Result	United Irish victory

Belligerents
United Irishmen	Kingdom of Great Britain: Kingdom of Ireland

Commanders and leaders
Fr. John Murphy	Lieutenant-Colonel Walpole †

Strength
?	400

Casualties and losses
?	100 killed

The Battle of Tubberneering (also Tuberneering or Toberanierin) took place during the Wexford Rebellion fought on 4 June 1798 between Crown forces and United Irish insurgents, at Tubberneering (modern townlands of Toberanierin North and Toberanierin South) south of Gorey in the north of County Wexford. The rebels ambushed and routed the British.

The battle was an ambush of a British force of 400 men under Lieutenant-Colonel Walpole, containing one troop of regular cavalry (the 4th Royal Irish Dragoon Guards) and militia and yeomanry auxiliaries. They were ambushed in a narrow defile by United Irish rebels. Walpole and 100 men were killed, the rest, throwing away their weapons and uniforms, fled. The regular dragoons made an attempt to fight back but they were in a bad place for cavalry so they withdrew. This defeat allowed three cannon to be captured which were subsequently used against British troops at the battle of Arklow. The rebels were unable to take Arklow however. The day after the engagement at Tubberneering, the United Irishmen tried to take New Ross in the south of county Wexford but were repulsed at a heavy cost.
