= Boolavogue =

Village in County Wexford, Ireland

Boolavogue Buaile Mhaodhóg
- Village
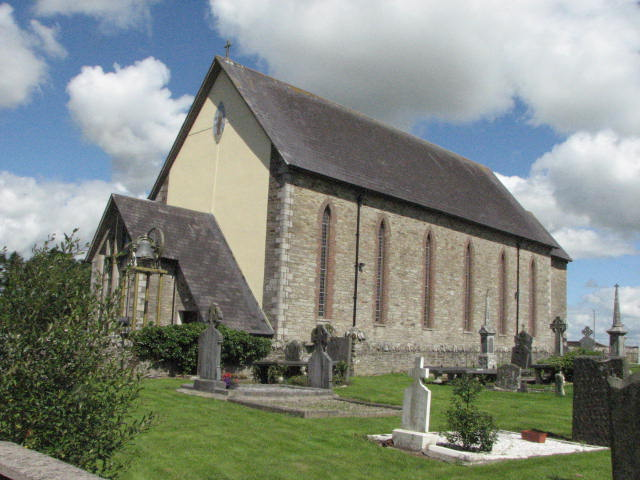
- Boolavogue church

- Location in Ireland
- Coordinates: 52°33′18″N 6°25′12″W
- Country: Ireland
- Province: Leinster
- County: County Wexford
- Elevation: 60 m (200 ft)
- Time zone: UTC+0 (WET)
  - Summer (DST): UTC-1 (IST (WEST))
- Irish Grid Reference: T064462

Boolavogue, also spelt Boolavoge or Boleyvogue (Irish: Buaile Mhaodhóg), is a village 12 km northeast of Enniscorthy in County Wexford, Ireland. It is in the Roman Catholic Diocese of Ferns.

It has given its name to "Boolavogue", an Irish ballad commemorating the Irish Rebellion of 1798, when the local parish priest Father John Murphy led his parishioners into battle on 26 May 1798. The Wexford rebels were eventually defeated at the Battle of Vinegar Hill on 21 June. Father Murphy and the other rebel leaders were executed. Fr Murphy was hanged, then decapitated, his corpse burnt in a barrel of tar and his head placed on a spike as a warning to other rebels, many of whom nevertheless fought on for up to five years afterwards.

== See also ==
- List of towns and villages in Ireland
