= Battle of Oulart Hill =

Battle during the Irish Rebellion of 1798

- Part of the United Irishmen Rebellion
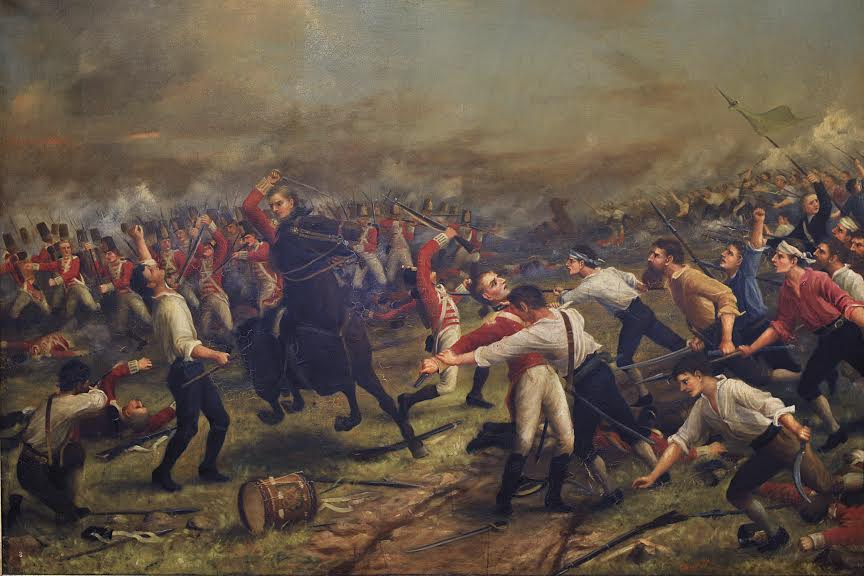
- United Irishmen charge at Oulart Hill.
Date	27 May 1798
Location	Oulart, County Wexford
Result	Irish rebel victory

Belligerents
United Irishmen	(Kingdom of Great Britain) Great Britain: (Kingdom of Ireland) British Ireland

Commanders and leaders
Fr. John Murphy	Colonel Foote

Strength
c.1,000	110

Casualties and losses
6 killed	105 killed

The Battle of Oulart Hill took place on 27 May 1798 when a rebel gathering of between approximately 1,000 annihilated a detachment of 110 militia sent from Wexford town to stamp out the spreading rebellion in County Wexford.

== Background ==
When news of the long expected rising on 23 May of the United Irishmen in the midlands reached county Wexford, it was already in an unsettled condition due to fears brought by the recently instituted anti-insurgent disarmament campaign in the county. The measures used included pitchcapping, half-hanging, and house burnings to uncover rebel conspirators. The recent arrival in Wexford of the North Cork Militia who were notorious for their brutality in the "pacification" of Ulster, terror raids by local yeomen and finally news of the massacres at Dunlavin Green, Carlow and Carnew, had the effect of drawing people together in large groups for security, especially at night.

One such group of one hundred or so had gathered on the evening of 26 May at The Harrow, near the parish of Boolavogue under the tutelage of Fr. John Murphy when they encountered a patrol of about 20 yeomen on their way to the house of a suspected rebel. They burned the suspect's dwelling but, returning empty-handed, they encountered Fr. Murphy's band again. The patrol were pushing their way through when a skirmish began in which they lost two of their number, the rest fleeing with news of the killings.

== Night of 26 May ==
The reaction on both sides was rapid; vengeful yeomanry patrols roamed, burning and killing indiscriminately. While the rebels roused the countryside and made several raids on manors and other houses holding arms, killing more loyalists and yeomen. News of the skirmish and raids had by now reached Wexford town and, on the morning of 27 May, the bulk of its garrison, 110 of the North Cork militia under Colonel Foote, were ordered north to crush the nascent rebellion. They were joined en route by some 16 yeomen cavalry under Colonel Le Hunt. However, these yeomanry were of doubtful loyalty, many (including their sergeant) having joined the rebels that morning.

== The Battle of Oulart Hill ==
An older depiction of the battle.

The militia reached the village of Oulart at 2 p.m. on 27 May. Finding a mass of from one to two thousand combatants with hundreds of women and children occupying the high ground of Oulart hill, they rashly advanced and pursued the rebels to the summit. The rebel leaders mistakenly believed a large body of yeoman cavalry was waiting to intercept their flight, so their forces desperately turned to face their enemy and "killed the whole detachment in an instant", leaving only the commanding officer, Colonel Foote, and four other survivors to escape to their base at Wexford

Foote reported that, contrary to his orders, the militia had advanced incautiously and were surrounded and overpowered by the overwhelming rebel numbers, mostly armed with pikes, and that "great numbers" of the rebels were killed.

Following the rebel victory, almost all of North Wexford joined the rebellion. Crown forces and loyalist civilians ceded control of the countryside, withdrawing to towns such as Enniscorthy, Gorey and Wexford.
