= Battle of Arklow =

Battle of the Irish Rebellion of 1798

Coordinates: 52.7941°N 6.1649°W

Battle of Arklow (1798)
- Part of the Irish Rebellion of 1798
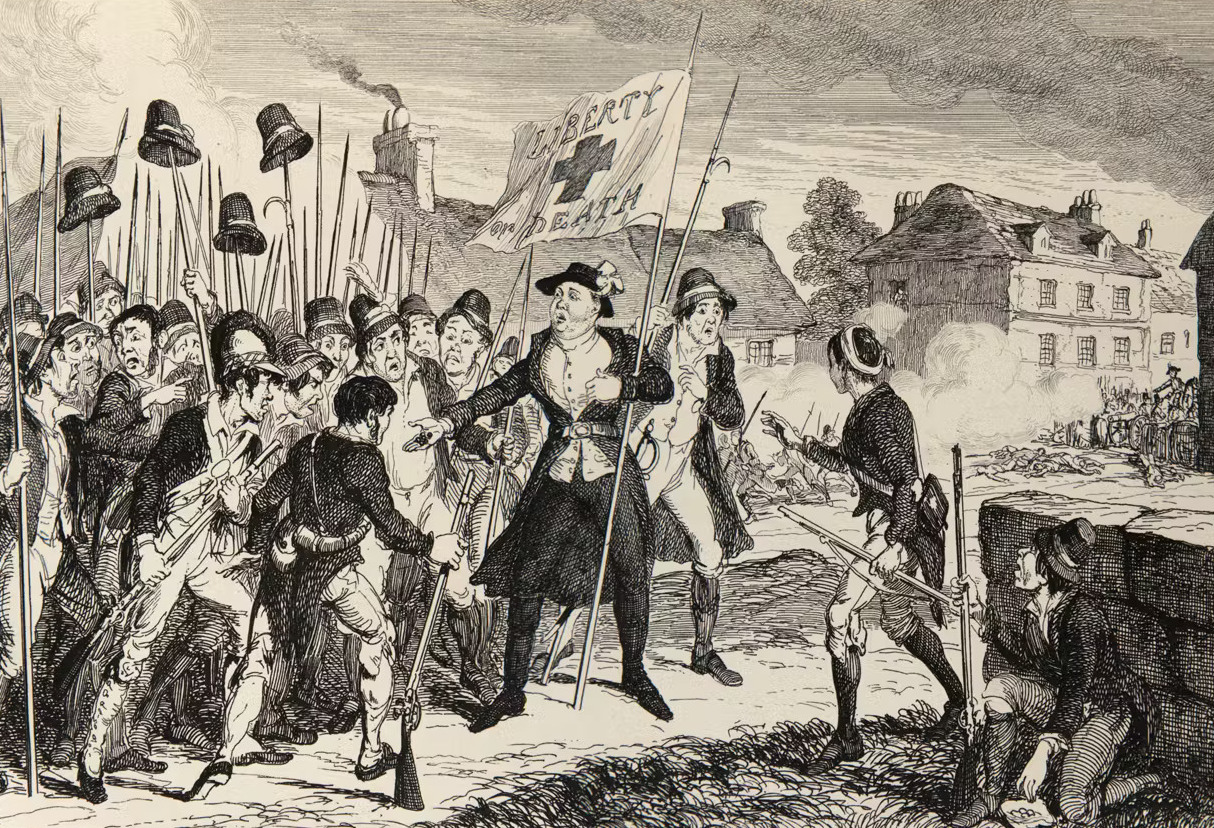
- 1845 engraving of the battle
Date	9 June 1798
Location	Arklow, County Wicklow
Result	British victory

Belligerents
Kingdom of Great Britain: Kingdom of Ireland	United Irishmen

Commanders and leaders
Francis Needham	Billy Byrne; Anthony Perry; Edward Fitzgerald; Michael Murphy †

Strength
1,700	10,000

Casualties and losses
50–100 killed or wounded	500–1,000 killed or wounded

The Battle of Arklow took place during the Irish Rebellion of 1798 on 9 June when a force of United Irishmen from Wexford, estimated at 10,000 strong, launched an assault into County Wicklow, on the British-held town of Arklow, in an attempt to spread the rebellion into Wicklow and to threaten the capital of Dublin.

== Background ==
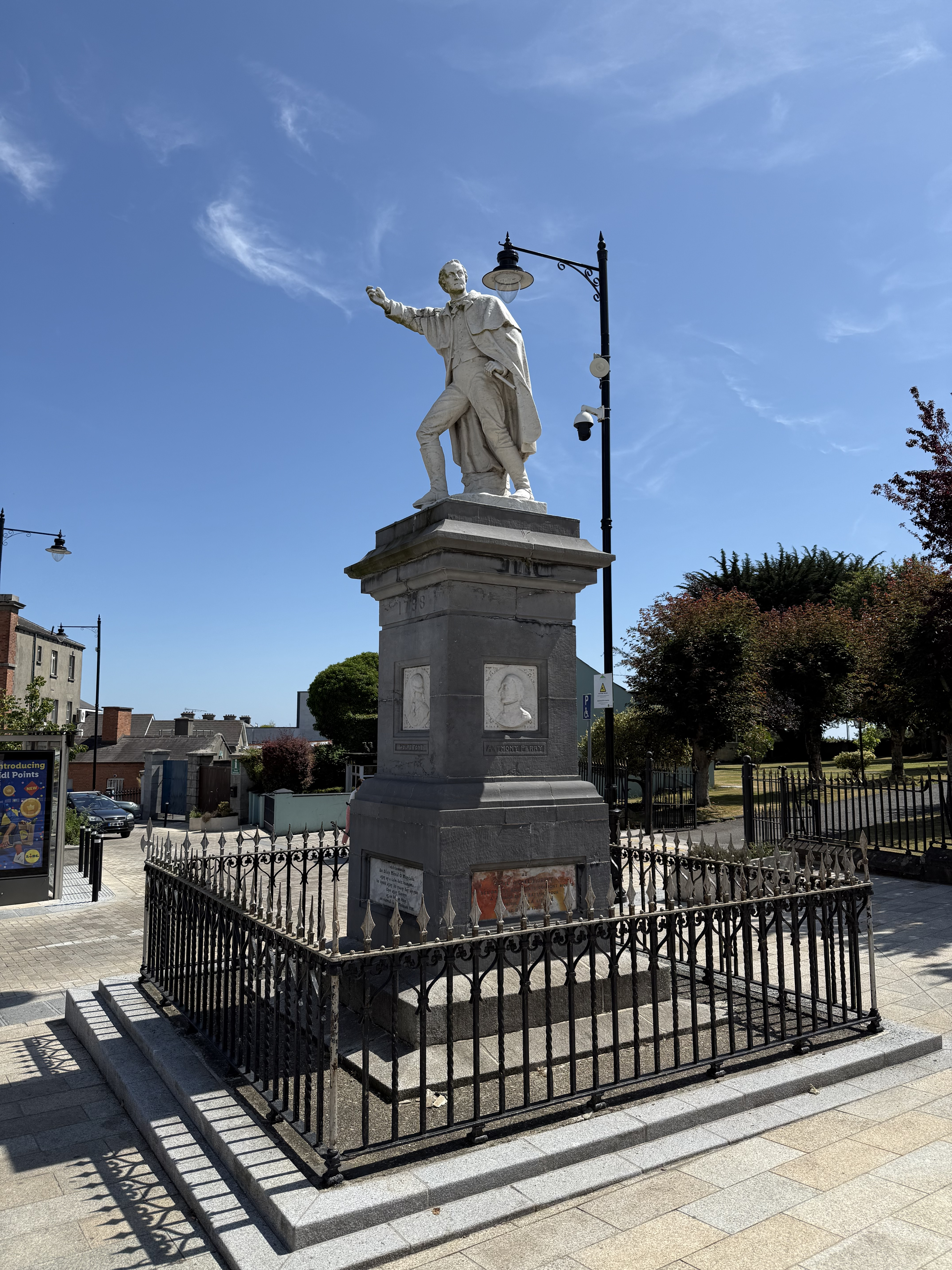
Monument to Michael Murphy at Arklow

A British advance force of 400 was defeated at Tuberneering on 4 June. This rebel victory had punched a hole in the dragnet the military had attempted to throw around county Wexford and had also yielded them three artillery pieces. The town of Arklow had been evacuated in the ensuing panic but the rebels had contented themselves with taking the town of Gorey and stayed within the Wexford border. On 5 June the rebels attempted to break out of county Wexford across the river Barrow and to spread the rebellion but were halted by a major British victory at the Battle of New Ross. When the rebels finally moved against Arklow, the town had been reoccupied by a force of 1,700 men sent from Dublin under Francis Needham, who quickly fortified the town with barricades and had artillery positioned on all the approaches to the town.

== The battle ==
The rebel army that formed for attack on the afternoon of 9 June was a combined force of Wexford and Wicklow rebels led by Billy Byrne, Anthony Perry, Conor McEvoy, Edward Fitzgerald, and Fr. Michael Murphy. The British in Arklow consisted of ~1000 militia from counties Antrim and Cavan and 150 regular cavalry supported by 250 Yeomanry, they were joined by 315 Durham Fencibles (Princess of Wales's Fencible Dragoons) arriving an hour before the rebels.

The area surrounding the town and the approaches was covered by scrub and the rebel strategy adopted was to advance under cover attacking the town simultaneously from several points. Before the action began, the rebels under Esmonde Kyan opened fire upon the town with some of the artillery captured at Tuberneering and had some success by scoring a direct hit on a British artillery position, destroying the cannon and killing the attendant crew. The main assault was quickly launched but at all entry points the Irish were thrown back by the musket fire of the well-trained and disciplined militia and volunteers, and canister shot from the 3-pounder battalion gun brought by the fencibles. An attempt by the British to turn the Irish failure into a rout was defeated when pikemen and sharpshooters drove a cavalry charge back across the Avoca River, but an attempt to force a way into the town through the outlying fishing port was bloodily repulsed.

As Irish casualties mounted, the lack of ammunition and proper leadership began to work against them, and after Fr. Murphy was killed leading a charge, their attacks started to peter out. As nightfall came, the rebels began to withdraw under cover of darkness and collect their wounded and were not pursued or molested by the garrison who were, unknown to the rebels, down to their last three or four rounds per man and were themselves at the brink of defeat.

== Aftermath ==
While rebel casualties were estimated at 1,000 no full casualty list seems to exist on the British side, but were probably in the region of 50-100 dead and wounded. The defeat at Arklow marked the third failure to extend the fight for Irish independence beyond the borders of County Wexford following the other bloody repulses at New Ross and Bunclody. The rebel strategy now changed to a policy of static defence against the encroaching British forces.

== See also ==
- Battle of Arklow (1649)

== Primary references ==
- Myles Byrne (1780–1862) "Memoirs of Myles Byrne" (1863)
- J.B Gordon "History of the Rebellion in Ireland in the year 1798" (1801)
- Edward Hay (County Wexford), "History of the Insurrection of County Wexford" (1803)
- Richard Musgrave "Memoirs of the different rebellions in Ireland" (1801)
- H.F.B Wheeler & A.M Broadley "The war in Wexford: an account of the rebellion in the south of Ireland in 1798, told from original documents" (1910)
- Ward, S G P (2005) [1962]. Faithful. The Story of the Durham Light Infantry. Naval and Military Press. ISBN 978-1-84574-147-1.

== Secondary references ==
- C. Dickson The Wexford Rising in 1798: its causes and course (1955) ISBN 0-09-478390-X
- G.A. Hayes-McCoy Irish Battles (1969) ISBN 0-86281-250-X
