= Michael Murphy (priest) =

18th century Irish Catholic priest and revolutionary

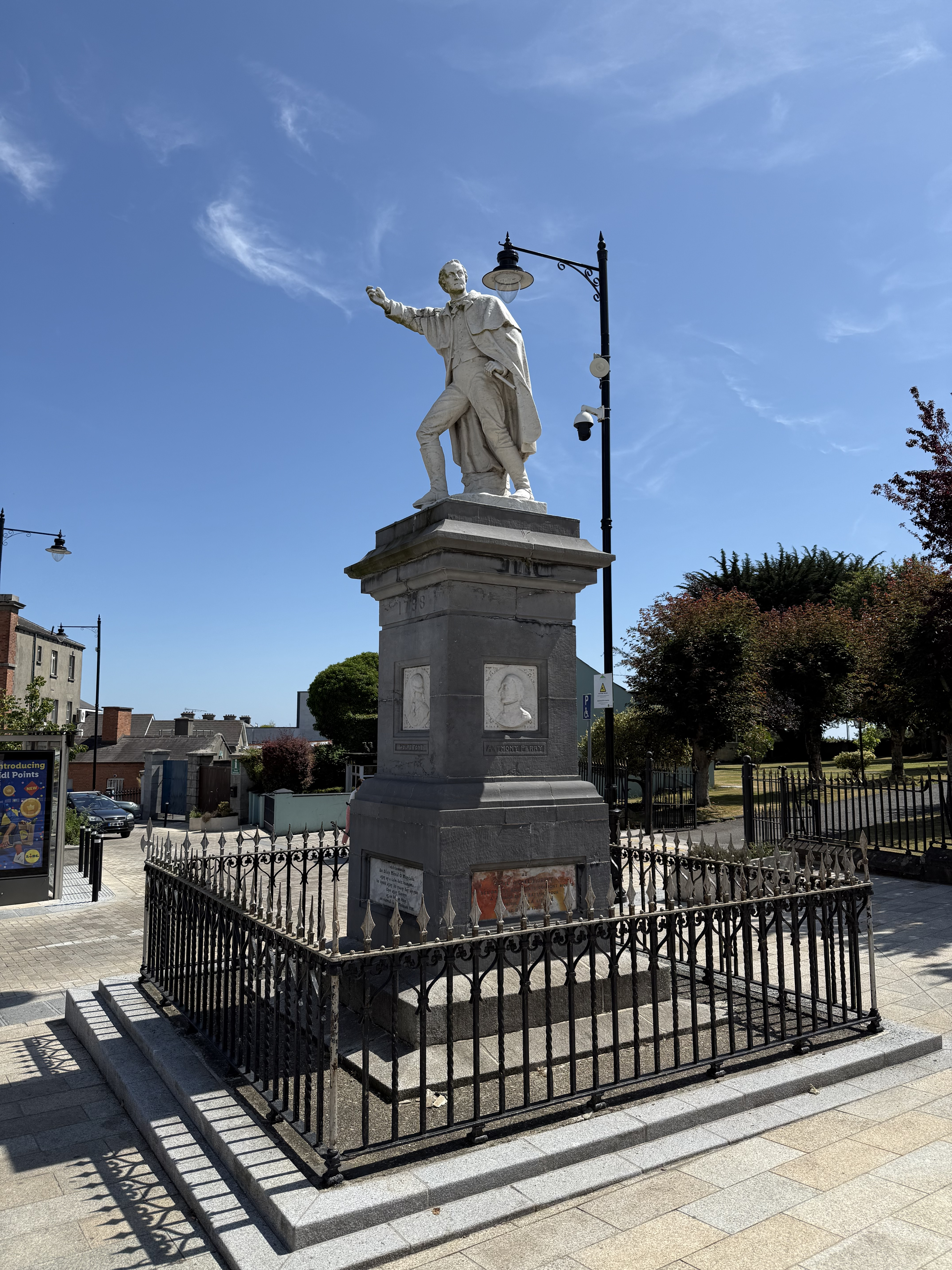
Michael Murphy Monument in Arklow, County Wicklow.

Fr. Michael Murphy (c. 1767 – 9 June 1798) was an Irish Roman Catholic priest and United Irishmen leader during the Irish Rebellion of 1798.

While his birthplace in Ireland is undetermined, various locations (such as Ballinoulart, Castleannesley or in Kilnew, County Wexford) are documented as possibilities. He was ordained a priest in 1785 at Wexford after completing hedge school in Oulart. After continuing his Theology and Philosophy studies at the Irish College in Bordeaux in France, his first parish was at Ballycanew. Murphy joined the Rebellion on 27 May 1798 following the vandalism of his church by yeomanry, in defiance of the strictly anti-United Irishmen stance of the Hierarchy of the Catholic Church in Ireland.

Murphy proceeded towards battle at Gorey, Kilthomas Hill, then Ballyorril Hill where he met with fellow priest Fr. John Murphy of Boolavogue. Murphy was attacking a gun position on horseback at the Battle of Arklow on 9 June 1798 when he was killed by gunfire. His grave is at Castle Ellis.
