= Battle of Vinegar Hill =

Battle of the Irish Rebellion of 1798

- Part of the Irish Rebellion of 1798
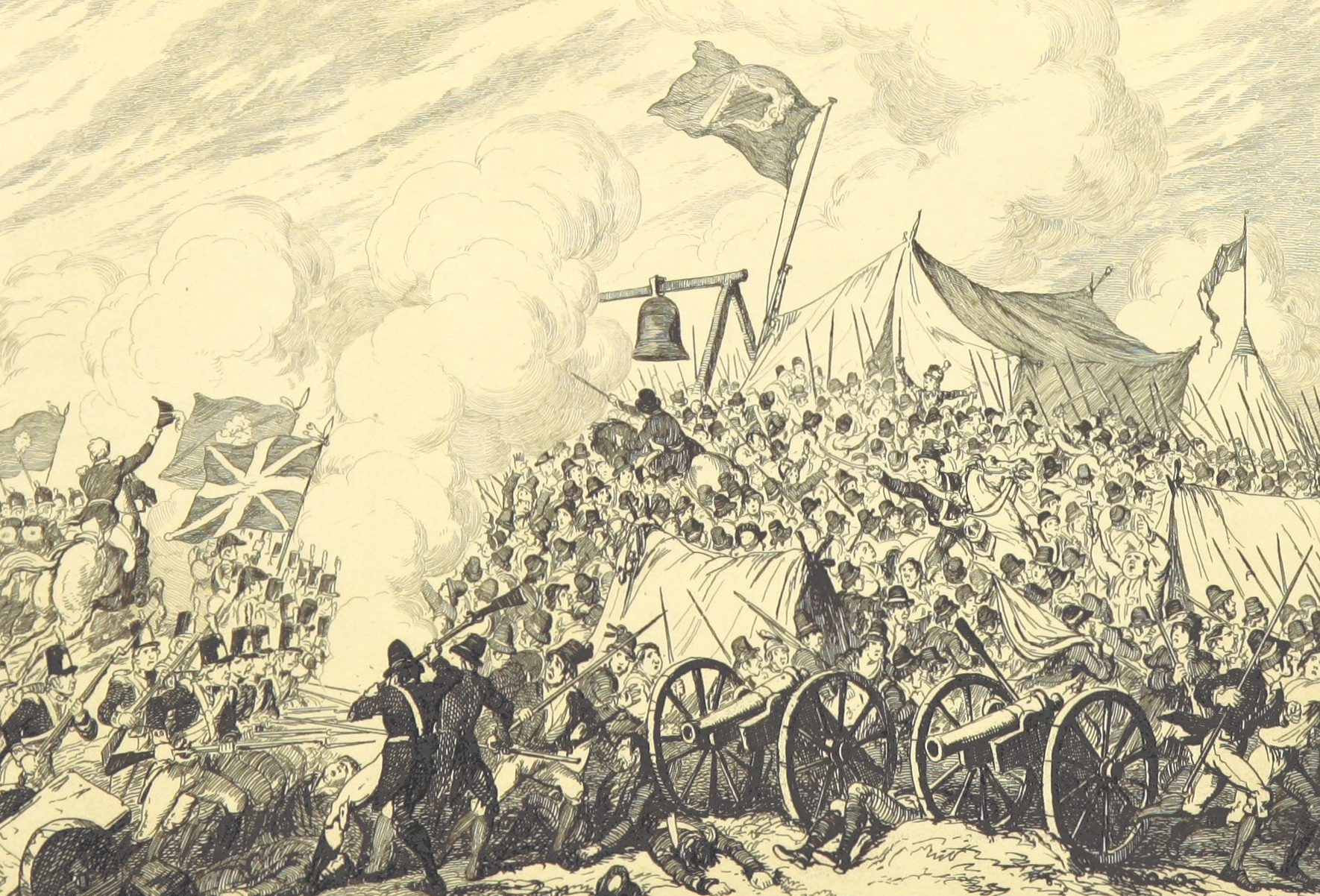
- 1845 illustration of the battle
Date	21 June 1798
Location	52.5019°N 6.5535°W; Enniscorthy, County Wexford
Result	British victory

Belligerents
Great Britain; Ireland	United Irishmen

Commanders and leaders
Gerard Lake; Francis Needham; Henry Johnson; James Duff; David Dundas	Anthony Perry; John Murphy; Myles Byrne; Mogue Kearns

Strength
~13,000	~16,000

Casualties and losses
~100 killed and wounded	~1,200 killed

The Battle of Vinegar Hill (Irish: Cath Chnoc Fhíodh na gCaor) was a military engagement during the Irish Rebellion of 1798 on 21 June 1798 between a force of approximately 13,000 government troops under the command of Gerard Lake and 16,000 United Irishmen rebels led by Anthony Perry. The battle, a major rebel defeat, took place on a large rebel camp on Vinegar Hill and in the streets of Enniscorthy, County Wexford and marked the last major attempt by the rebels to hold and control territory taken in Wexford.

== Background ==
By 18 June 1798, a government force led by Gerard Lake and numbering roughly 13,000-strong had surrounded County Wexford and were ready to march into the county and suppress the rebellion. Local United Irishmen commanders issued a call for all rebels in the county to gather at Vinegar Hill to confront Lake's force in a pitched battle. The number of rebels assembled was roughly 16,000, but the majority lacked muskets and were instead equipped with pikes as their main weapon. Thousands of women and children were also at the rebel camp at Vinegar Hill, many of whom were camp followers.

Prior to the battle, Lake and his subordinates drafted up a plan to capture the Vinegar Hill camp and defeat the rebels located there. This plan called for government forces to encircle the hill and taking control of the only escape route to the west of Vinegar Hill, a bridge over the River Slaney. Lake divided his force into four columns to carry out the plan; three columns, each led by David Dundas, James Duff and Francis Needham were to assault Vinegar Hill, while the fourth column, led by Henry Johnson, was to capture the rebel-town of Enniscorthy and a nearby bridge.

== Battle ==
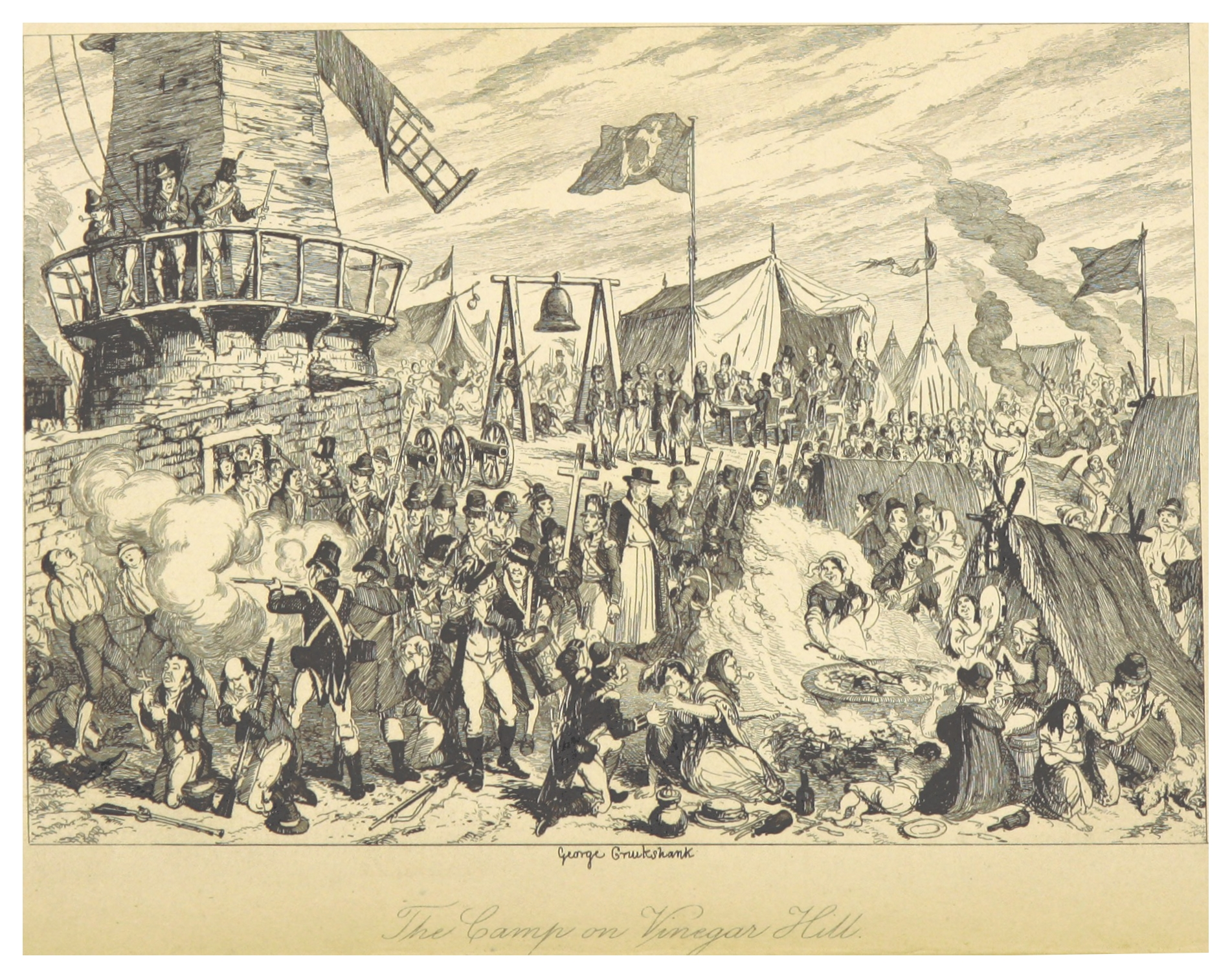
"The Camp on Vinegar Hill" - an illustration by George Cruikshank to accompany William Hamilton Maxwell's 1845 work History of the Irish rebellion in 1798

The battle began shortly before the dawn of 21 June with an artillery bombardment of rebel positions on Vinegar Hill. Dundas, Duff and Needham's columns were ordered to advance against rebel outposts on the hill under the cover of the bombardment, with the artillery guns being gradually moved closer as rebel outposts were secured. The tightening ring of enemy troops surrounding rebel positions forced the rebels to constantly withdraw into the hill, which exposed them to artillery fire (in particular a new experimental form of ammunition, shrapnel shells) and led to hundreds of rebels being killed and wounded. Two massed infantry charges were launched against the attacking government forces by rebel forces, which were both repulsed, with the situation facing the rebels becoming increasingly desperate.

In the meantime, Johnson's column, which included a detachment of light infantry, attacked Enniscorthy but was met with fierce resistance from rebels in the town, who had fortified many of Enniscorthy's buildings. The initial attack on the town was driven back, with Johnson's column suffering several casualties and losing several cannon. After receiving reinforcements which included a detachment of cavalry, Johnson ordered his troops to launch a second attack which slowly pushed the rebels out of Enniscorthy and recaptured the lost artillery, though rebel forces inflicted heavy casualties on the attackers. The rebels were able to defend the River Slaney bridge and prevent Johnson's force from crossing it.

When the three advancing columns had crested the eastern summit of Vinegar Hill, the remaining rebels began to slowly withdraw through a gap in enemy lines known as "Needham's Gap", which existed due to Needham's column moving at a slower pace than the other two columns, something which prevented the hill from being totally encircled. Though the bulk of the rebel force was able to escape through this gap, many rebels were unable to do so and became trapped by the advancing columns.

== Aftermath ==
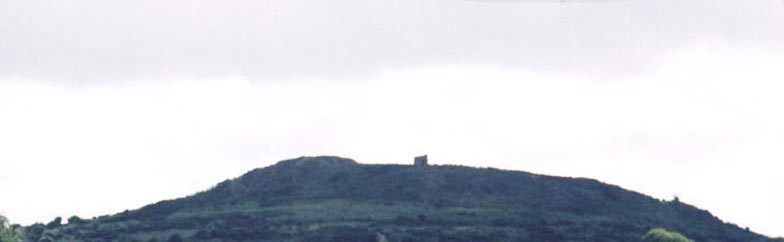
A view of Vinegar Hill from Enniscorthy

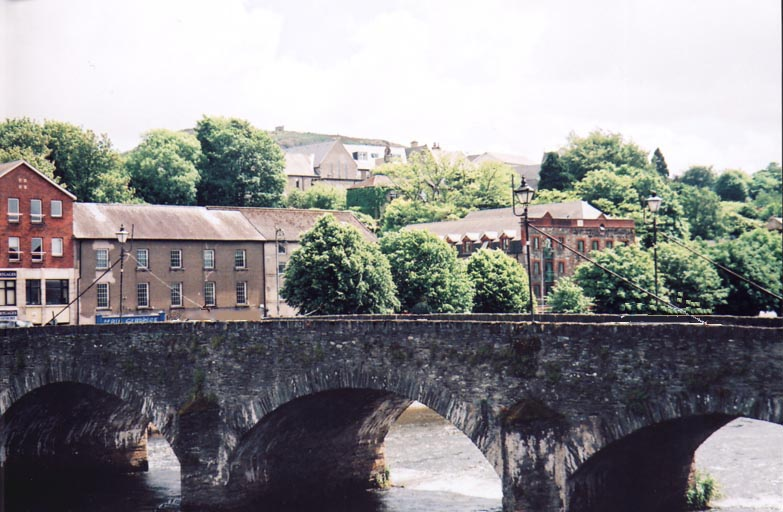
The bridge at Enniscorthy, with Vinegar Hill visible in background

After government forces seized the hill, there were many instances of females among the rebels being raped and sexually assaulted by the military. In Enniscorthy, soldiers from Johnson's column set fire to a rebel aid station in the town, resulting in several wounded rebels being burned to death. The rebels abandoned most of the supplies they had stored at the camp in the retreat, and thirteen artillery pieces, most of which had been captured from government forces, were recaptured after the battle.

A number of disparate assessments of rebel casualties were made after the battle, with estimates ranging from 400 to 1,200 killed. Historian Kevin Whelan estimates that between 500 and 1,000 rebels (including camp followers) were killed, while military eyewitness Archibald McLaren wrote that rebel casualties amounted to 1,200 killed. In 2017 the Vinegar Hill Research Project located a number of mass graves apparently dug to dimensions specified in the British army field manual of the time, suggesting the remains of 1,500-2,000 people lie within. In contrast, government forces reported roughly 100 killed and wounded. Murphy was captured after the battle near Tullow, County Carlow and executed by hanging.

After the battle, the majority of the rebel forces retreated unmolested towards the Three Rocks camp near the town of Wexford. There, rebel commanders agreed to abandon the camp and split into two separate columns in order to launch a new campaign aimed at reviving the rebellion outside County Wexford. One column moved west, and the other north towards the Wicklow Mountains to link up with Joseph Holt's rebels. As such, the defeat was not the decisive rebel defeat as it has been commonly portrayed, though it did alter the nature of further fighting as rebel military actions subsequently consisted exclusively of mobile warfare, raids and other guerilla operations.

== Commemoration ==
The Battle of Vinegar Hill is commemorated annually in Enniscorthy, County Wexford, through pageants, re-enactments, and public ceremonies that honour the participants in the 1798 Rebellion. The battle has also been preserved in regional folklore. One example concerns Wiggy Hourigan of Murroe, County Limerick, who is said to have fought at Vinegar Hill, lost his horse during the engagement, and escaped by taking the mount of a Hessian officer. His story, recorded in Hourigan family accounts, reflects the persistence of the event in Irish oral and local historical traditions.

== In popular culture ==
In his poem Requiem For the Croppies, Irish poet Seamus Heaney depicted the battle as "the fatal conclave" where the last hopes for the rebellion to succeed were finally crushed, though the poem's final line depicts the barley in the pockets of dead rebels growing through the soil used to bury them in, symbolising that their dreams of independence live on.

== See also ==
- Castle Hill convict rebellion
- Vinegar Hill (Charlottesville, Virginia)
- Vinegar Hill, Brooklyn

== Primary sources ==
- Byrne, Miles. (1780–1862) – Memoirs.
- Cullen, Luke. Personal Recollections of Wexford and Wicklow Insurgents of 1798 (1938).
- Cloney, Thomas. A Personal Narrative of those Transactions in the County of Wexford, in which the author was engaged, during the awful period of 1798. Dublin, 1832.
- Gordon, James B. History of the Rebellion in Ireland in the year 1798, &c. London, 1803.
- Maxwell. W.H. "History of the Irish Rebellion in 1798 with Memoirs of the Union and Bennetts Insurrection of 1803" Bell & Daldy, Covent Gardens, 1861.

== Secondary sources ==
- Dickson, Charles. The Wexford Rising in 1798: Its Causes and Course. Tralee, 1955.
- Furlong, Nicholas. Fr. John Murphy of Boolavogue, 1753–98. Dublin, 1991. ISBN 0906602181.
- Gahan, Daniel. The People's Rising. Wexford 1798. Dublin: Gill & Macmillan Ltd., 1995.
- Kee, Robert. The Green Flag: A History of Irish Nationalism. London, 1972.
- Keogh, Daire & Nicholas Furlong (Editors). The Mighty Wave: The 1798 Rebellion in Wexford. Dublin: Four Courts Press, 1996. ISBN 1851822542.
