= Battle of Antrim =

Battle during the Irish Rebellion of 1798

Coordinates: 54.722°N 6.231°W

- Part of the Irish Rebellion
Date	7 June 1798
Location	Antrim, County Antrim
Result	British victory

Belligerents
United Irishmen; Defenders	British Army; Irish Loyalists

Commanders and leaders
Henry McCracken; James Hope; John Storie; John Orr	Daniel Seddon; William Lumley (WIA); Col Durham; Col Cleavering; Lord O'Neill †

Strength
~4,000; 1 artillery piece	~200 (Note: later reinforced by 4,000); 8 artillery pieces

Casualties and losses
~400 killed	~150 killed and wounded

The Battle of Antrim was fought on 7 June 1798, in County Antrim, Ireland, during the Irish Rebellion of 1798 between British troops and Irish insurgents led by Henry Joy McCracken. The British won the battle, beating off a rebel attack on Antrim town following the arrival of reinforcements, but the county governor, the 1st Viscount O'Neill, was fatally wounded.

== Background ==
The outbreak of the United Irish rebellion in Leinster on 23 May had prompted calls from Ulster United Irishmen to take to the field in support of their southern comrades. However, the organisation in Ulster had been severely damaged in a brutal disarmament campaign the previous year, and the new leadership were less radical and were not willing take to the field without French assistance, which was expected daily.

After waiting for two weeks while the rebellion raged in the south, the grassroots United Irish membership in Antrim decided to hold a number of meetings independent of their leaders. The outcome was the election of Henry Joy McCracken as their adjutant general and the decision to rise immediately. McCracken, together with James Hope, quickly formulated a plan to attack and seize all government outposts in County Antrim and then for the main attack to fall on Antrim town. Then using artillery seized at Antrim, the rebels were to march on Belfast in conjunction with the United Irish rebels in County Down.

McCracken had high hopes that many members of the militia would desert and join him, as disaffection was believed to be widespread, evidenced by the execution of four of the Monaghan militia for treason in Belfast in May.

== Rebellion in Antrim ==
On 6 June, McCracken and James Hope issued a proclamation calling for the United army of Ulster to rise. The initial plan met with success, as the towns of Larne (1st town in Ulster to fall at 3am on the 7th under the leadership of James O'Rourke), Ballymena, Portaferry and Randalstown (captured by James Dickey) were taken and the bridge at Toome damaged to prevent the government rushing reinforcements into Antrim from west of the Bann. The rebels then assembled at Donegore Hill in preparation for the march and attack on Antrim town, where an emergency meeting of the county's magistrates called by the county governor, Lord O'Neill, was due to take place.

Although almost 10,000 rebels assembled at Donegore, many displayed reluctance for the coming fight and stayed on the hill in reserve or deserted later so that probably fewer than 4,000 actually took part in the attack. The United Irishmen in Ulster were mostly Presbyterian, but were joined with Catholic Defenders and the tension between the two groups on the march may have caused some desertions. These difficulties led to a loss of momentum, and the attack was delayed. McCracken was forced to make adjustments to his plan of attack, which had envisaged a simultaneous overwhelming assault on the town from four separate points.

== Garrison at Antrim ==
The town was garrisoned by a small force of about 200 yeomen, cavalry under Lt-Col William Lumley and armed volunteers but they also had four artillery pieces and the delay in the rebel attack had allowed them to send requests for assistance to Belfast and Lisburn from where reinforcements were already on the way. The garrison formed themselves at the base of the demesne wall of Antrim Castle, with artillery to the front and cavalry to the rear with their flanks anchored by the Market House and Presbyterian Meeting House. A part of the Scottish Quarter in the town was also burned by the garrison as it was perceived to be a stronghold of rebel sympathisers.

== Attack begins ==
The attack finally began shortly before 3pm when the rebels began a cautious march through the town. As rebel front ranks arrived to face the garrison's defensive line, artillery opened fire on the rebels, causing them to pull back out of range. Large clouds of dust and smoke were thrown up which, together with the fires from the Scottish Quarter, obscured the garrison's view of events.

The rebel withdrawal was mistaken for a full retreat and the cavalry moved out to pursue and rout the supposed fleeing rebels. The cavalry effectively ran into a gauntlet of rebels who were protected by a long churchyard wall and stationed in houses along the main street, suffering heavy losses to the gunfire and pikes of the rebels.

After routing the cavalry, the rebels attacked the remainder of the garrison, which then began to pull back to the safety of the castle wall; this was mistaken by a newly arrived rebel column as an attack on them, causing them to flee in panic. In the confusion, the county commander, Lord O'Neill, trapped with his magistrates, was fatally wounded by John Clements, who avoided trial by joining the army. A rebel attempt to seize the artillery was only narrowly beaten off by troops stationed behind the demesne wall.

At this critical juncture, British reinforcements from Belfast arrived outside the town and, assuming it to be held by the rebels, began to shell it with their artillery. This prompted more desertions and the rebel army began to disintegrate, but their withdrawal was protected by a small band under James Hope which fought a successful rearguard action from the church grounds along the main street, which allowed the bulk of the rebels to withdraw safely.

== Aftermath ==
When the military entered the town, they began a spree of looting, burning and murder, of which the most enthusiastic perpetrators were reported to be the Monaghan militiamen, who were anxious to prove their loyalty and expunge the shame of the recent executions of their comrades for sedition. The town of Templepatrick was burned to the ground and Old Stone Castle was razed to the ground. McCracken, Hope and their remaining supporters withdrew northwards, establishing camps of ever dwindling size along the route of their retreat until news of the defeat at Ballynahinch caused their final dispersion. McCracken was arrested by yeomen on 7 July and was hanged in Belfast on 17 July, having refused an offer of clemency in return for informing on his comrades.

Commemoration of the centenary of the battle, marked by a nationalist parade in Belfast on 6 June 1898, provoked loyalist riots.
