= John Sweetman (United Irishman) =

Irish nationalist and brewer (1752–1826)

John Sweetman (1752 – 1826) was an Irish republican, a delegate to the 1792 Catholic Convention and a member of the Leinster directory of the United Irishman.

== Life ==
Sweetman was born of Catholic parents in Raheny, then a village north of Dublin, in 1752; the family had for more than a century operated an extensive brewery in the city. Sweetman succeeded to the ownership of the brewery on the death of his father.

He identified with the movement for the removal of the civil and religious disabilities of the Catholics coordinated from Dublin by the Catholic Committee. in 1791, he supported the vigorous policy initiated by John Keogh that led to the secession from the Committee of most of the Catholic gentry Sweetman was a delegate to the national Catholic Convention which assembled in Dublin on 3 December 1792, the proceedings of which led to the partial Catholic Relief Act of 1793. In the same year a secret committee of the Irish House of Lords accused certain "ill-disposed members" of the Catholic Church of contributing money in support of the "Defenders," a secret agrarian society. They founded this assertion upon the discovery of a letter by Sweetman, enclosing money to defend a peasant accused of "Defenderism." Sweetman immediately published A Refutation, in which he denied the accusation, and stated that he had offered assistance because he believed the man to be innocent. He described himself as "Secretary to the sub-committee of the Catholics of Ireland."

Sweetman was an active United Irishman. He was a member of the Leinster directory of the revolutionary organisation, and some of the most important meetings of its executive committee took place at his brewery in Francis Street, Dublin. Shortly before the Irish Rebellion he was arrested with other leaders of the movement on 12 March 1798. After the suppression of the disordered insurrection in the summer of 1798, they entered into a compact with the government, by which, in consideration of a promise of the suspension of the executions of United Irishmen, they made full disclosure of their objects and plans, without implicating individuals, before committees of the Lords and Commons. Sweetman was one of the group sent to Fort George in Scotland early in 1799. In June 1802 they were deported to Holland and set at liberty. Sweetman was one of the few Catholics of position who belonged to the organisation of United Irishmen as a revolutionary conspiracy. Of the twenty leaders consigned to Fort George, ten were Episcopalians, six were Presbyterians, and only four (including Sweetman) were Catholics. Wolfe Tone wrote in his pocket-book on the day after he had been sentenced to death: Te nunc habet ista secundem ("This now has thee [Sweetman] as my successor"). These lines are from Virgil's Eclogues, and the pocketbook was delivered to Sweetman by Tone's father.

After eighteen years of exile, Sweetman was permitted to return to Ireland in 1820. He died in May 1826, and was buried at Swords, County Dublin.

== Personal life ==
Sweetman married, in 1784, Mary Atkinson, the daughter of another Dublin brewer.
