= Society of United Irishmen =

Society of United Irishmen Cumann na nÉireannach Aontaithe
- Governing body: Ulster, and Leinster, provincial committees
- Founded: 1791; 235 years ago
- Dissolved: 1804; 222 years ago
- Newspaper: Belfast: Northern Star. Cork: Harp of Erin. Dublin: The Rights of Irishmen or National Evening Star; Union Star; Press. Roscrea: Southern Star.
- Political position: Catholic-Protestant unity for democratic reform and, from 1795/1796, for an independent Irish republic
- International affiliation: Allied to the French First Republic, United Scotsmen, United Englishmen/United Britons

Party flag

The Society of United Irishmen was a sworn association, formed in the wake of the French Revolution, to secure representative government in Ireland. Despairing of constitutional reform, and in defiance both of British Crown forces and of Irish sectarian division, in 1798 the United Irishmen instigated a republican rebellion. Their suppression was a prelude to the abolition of the Irish Parliament in Dublin and to Ireland's incorporation in a United Kingdom with Great Britain.

Espousing principles they believed had been vindicated by American independence and by the French Declaration of the Rights of Man, the Presbyterian merchants who formed the first United society in Belfast in 1791 vowed to make common cause with their Catholic-majority fellow countrymen. Their "cordial union" would upend the landed Anglican Ascendancy and hold government accountable to a reformed Parliament.

As it radiated out from Belfast and from Dublin, the society drew on the structure and ritual of freemasonry to recruit among tradesmen, artisans and tenant farmers, many of whom had been organised in their own clubs and secret fraternities. Following its proscription in 1794, its goals were restated in uncompromising terms. Catholic emancipation and parliamentary reform became the call for universal manhood suffrage and a republic. Sharing a common democratic programme, and trading on the prospect of French assistance, agents were active in organising "United" societies in Scotland and in England with whom it was hoped action might be co-ordinated.

Beginning in May 1798, martial-law seizures and arrests forced the conspiracy in Ireland into the open. The result was a series of local risings suppressed in advance of the landing, in August, of a small French expeditionary force.

In the wake of the rebellion, the British government pressed a union with Great Britain upon the Irish Parliament and transferred its unreformed, exclusively Protestant, representation to Westminster. In 1803, a renewed republican conspiracy, organised on strictly military lines, failed to elicit a response in what had been the United heartlands in the north, and misfired with an aborted rising in Dublin.

Exiles formed a United Irish society in the United States where, during the Quasi War with France, it attracted the hostile attention of the governing Federalist Party. There were reports of United Irish oath-taking as a prelude to mutinies in the British Navy, and in Newfoundland and New South Wales.

Since the rebellion's centenary in 1898, Ireland's major political traditions, unionist, nationalist and republican, have claimed and disputed the legacy of the United Irishmen, and of the union they sought to effect between Catholic, Protestant and Dissenter.

== Background ==
=== Dissenters: "Americans in their hearts" ===
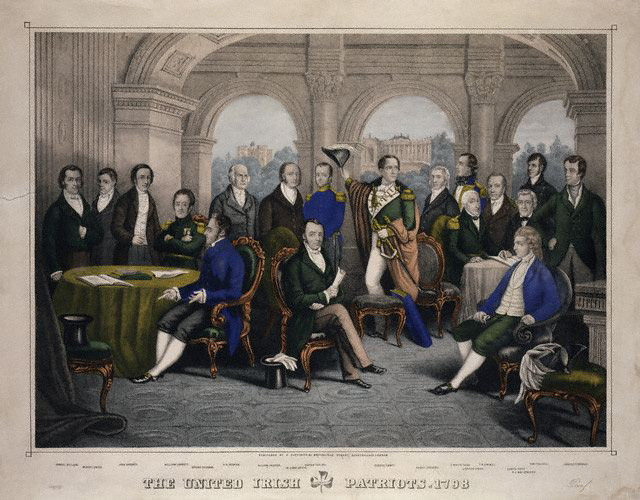
"The United Irish Patriots"

The Society was formed at a gathering in a Belfast tavern in October 1791. With the exception of Thomas Russell, a former India-service army officer from Cork, and Theobald Wolfe Tone, a Dublin political publicist, the participants who resolved to reform the government of Ireland on "principles of civil, political and religious liberty" were Presbyterians. As Dissenters from the established Anglican (Church of Ireland) communion, they were conscious of sharing, in part, the civil and political disabilities of the Kingdom's dispossessed Roman Catholic majority.

Although open to them as Protestants, the Parliament in Dublin offered little opportunity for representation or redress. Two-thirds of the Irish House of Commons represented boroughs in the pockets of Lords in the Upper House or of the government itself. Belfast's two MPs were elected by the thirteen members of the corporation, all nominees of the Chichesters, Marquesses of Donegall. Swayed by Crown patronage, parliament, in any case, exercised little hold upon the executive, the Dublin Castle administration which through the office of the Lord Lieutenant continued to be appointed by the King's ministers in London.

Faced with the tithes, rack rents and sacramental tests of this Ascendancy, and with restrictions on Irish trade in the English interest, Presbyterians had been voting by leaving Ireland in ever greater numbers. From 1710 to 1775 over 200,000 sailed for the North American colonies. When the American Revolutionary War commenced in 1775, there were few Presbyterian households that did not have relatives in America, many of whom would take up arms against the Crown.

Most of the Society's founding members and leadership were members of Belfast's first three "congregations of Protestant Dissenters" – Presbyterian churches, all in Rosemary Street. The obstetrician William Drennan, who in Dublin composed the United Irishmen's first test or oath, was the son of the minister of the First Church; Samuel Neilson, owner of the largest woollen warehouse in Belfast, was in the Second Church; Henry Joy McCracken, born into the town's leading fortunes in shipping and linen-manufacture, was a Third Church member. Despite theological differences (the First and Second Churches did not subscribe to the Westminster Confession of Faith, and the Third sustained an Old Light evangelical tradition), their elected, Scottish-educated ministers inclined in their teaching toward conscience rather than doctrine. In itself, this did not imply political radicalism. But it could, and (consistent with the teachings at Glasgow of the Ulster divine Francis Hutcheson) did, lead to acknowledgement from the pulpit of a right of collective resistance to oppressive government. In Rosemary Street's Third Church, Sinclair Kelburn preached in the uniform of an Irish Volunteer, with his musket propped against the pulpit door.

Assessing security on the eve of the American War, the British Viceroy, Lord Harcourt, described the Presbyterians of Ulster as Americans "in their hearts".

=== The Volunteers and Parliamentary Patriots ===
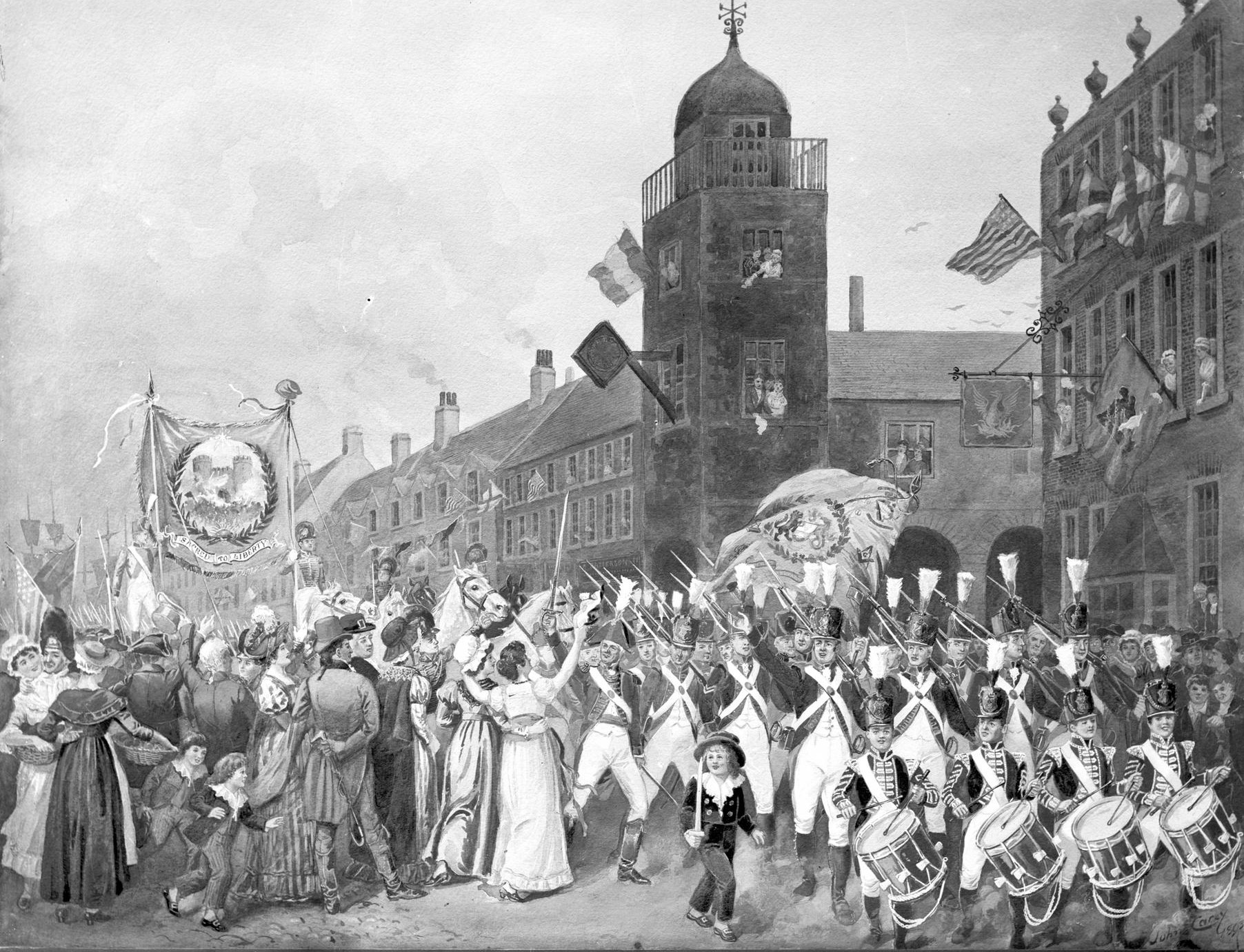
Bastille Day, 1792, Belfast. Volunteer companies parade "The Colours of Five Free Nations, viz.: Flag of Ireland – motto, Unite and be free. Flag of America – motto, The Asylum of Liberty. Flag of France – motto, The Nation, the Law, and the King. Flag of [Kościuszko's] Poland – motto, We will support it. Flag of Great Britain – motto, Wisdom, Spirit, and Liberality." Also portraits of Franklin – motto "Where Liberty is my country", and of Mirabeau – motto, "Can the African Slave Trade, though morally wrong, be politically right".

For the original members of the Society, the Irish Volunteers were a further source of prior association. Formed to secure the Kingdom as the British garrison was drawn down for American service, Volunteer companies were often little more than local landlords and their retainers armed and drilled. But in Dublin, and above all in Ulster (where they convened provincial conventions), they mobilised a much wider section of Protestant society.

In April 1782, with Volunteer cavalry, infantry, and artillery posted on all approaches to the Parliament in Dublin, Henry Grattan, leader of the Patriot opposition, had a Declaration of Irish Rights carried by acclaim in the Commons. London conceded, surrendering its powers to legislate for Ireland. In 1783 Volunteers converged again upon Dublin, this time to support proposals to limit or abolish the proprietary boroughs and to extend the existing (Protestant) forty-shilling freehold county franchise. But the Volunteer moment had passed. Having accepted defeat in America, Britain could again spare troops for Ireland, and the limits of the Ascendancy's patriotism had been reached. Parliament refused to be intimidated.

In 1784, beginning in Belfast (the "Boston of Ireland"), disappointed Volunteers in Ulster began taking Catholics into their ranks to form "united" companies. Belfast's First Company acted in the firm conviction that "a general Union of all the inhabitants of Ireland is necessary to the freedom and prosperity of this kingdom". The town's Blue Company followed suit, and on 30 May 1784 both companies paraded before St Mary's Chapel, Belfast's first Catholic church, to mark its inaugural mass.

With the news in 1789 of revolutionary events in France enthusiasm for constitutional reform revived. In its Declaration of the Rights of Man and of the Citizen and Civil Constitution of the Clergy, the greatest of the Catholic powers, was seen to be undergoing its own Glorious Revolution. In his Reflections on the Revolution in France (1790), Edmund Burke had sought to discredit any analogy with 1688 in England. But on reaching Belfast in October 1791, Tone found that Thomas Paine's response to Burke, the Rights of Man (of which the new society was to distribute thousands of copies for as little as a penny apiece), had already moved debate beyond anglocentric constitutionalism. In "the light of Paine's democratic convictions", the French Revolution was being viewed in "fundamentally ideological terms".

Three months before, on 14 July, the second anniversary of the Fall of the Bastille was celebrated with a triumphal Volunteer procession through Belfast and a solemn Declaration to the Great and Gallant people of France: "As Irishmen, We too have a country, and we hold it very dear – so dear... that we wish all Civil and Religious Intolerance annihilated in this land." Bastille Day the following year was greeted with similar scenes and an address to the French National Assembly hailing the soldiers of the new republic as "the advance guard of the world".

== Belfast and Dublin debates ==
=== First resolutions ===
William Drennan: "what is a country properly considered but a free constitution?"

It was in the midst of this enthusiasm for events in France that William Drennan proposed to his friends "a benevolent conspiracy — a plot for the people", the "Rights of Man and [employing the phrase coined by Hutcheson] the Greatest Happiness of the Greater Number its end — its general end Real Independence to Ireland, and Republicanism its particular purpose."

When Drennan's friends gathered in Belfast, they declared that in a "great era of reform, when unjust governments are falling in every quarter of Europe; ... when all government is acknowledged to originate from the people," the Irish people find themselves with "NO NATIONAL GOVERNMENT — we are ruled by Englishmen, and the servants of Englishmen whose object is the interest of another country". Such an injury could be remedied only by "a Cordial Union among ALL THE PEOPLE OF IRELAND" and "by a complete and radical reform of the Representation of the People in Parliament".

They urged their fellow countrymen to follow their example: to "form similar Societies in every quarter of the kingdom for the promotion of Constitutional knowledge, the abolition of bigotry in religion and policies, and the equal distribution of the Rights of Man through all Sects and Denominations of Irishmen".

The "conspiracy", which at Tone's suggestion called itself the Society of the United Irishmen, had moved beyond Flood's Protestant patriotism. English influence, exercised through the Dublin Castle Executive, would be checked constitutionally by a parliament in which "all the people" would have "an equal representation." Unclear, however, was whether the emancipation of Catholics was to be unqualified and immediate. The previous evening, witnessing a debate over the Catholic Question between the town's leading reformers (members of the Northern Whig Club) Tone had found himself "teased" by people agreeing in principle to Catholic emancipation, but then proposing that it be delayed or granted only in stages.

=== The Catholic Question ===
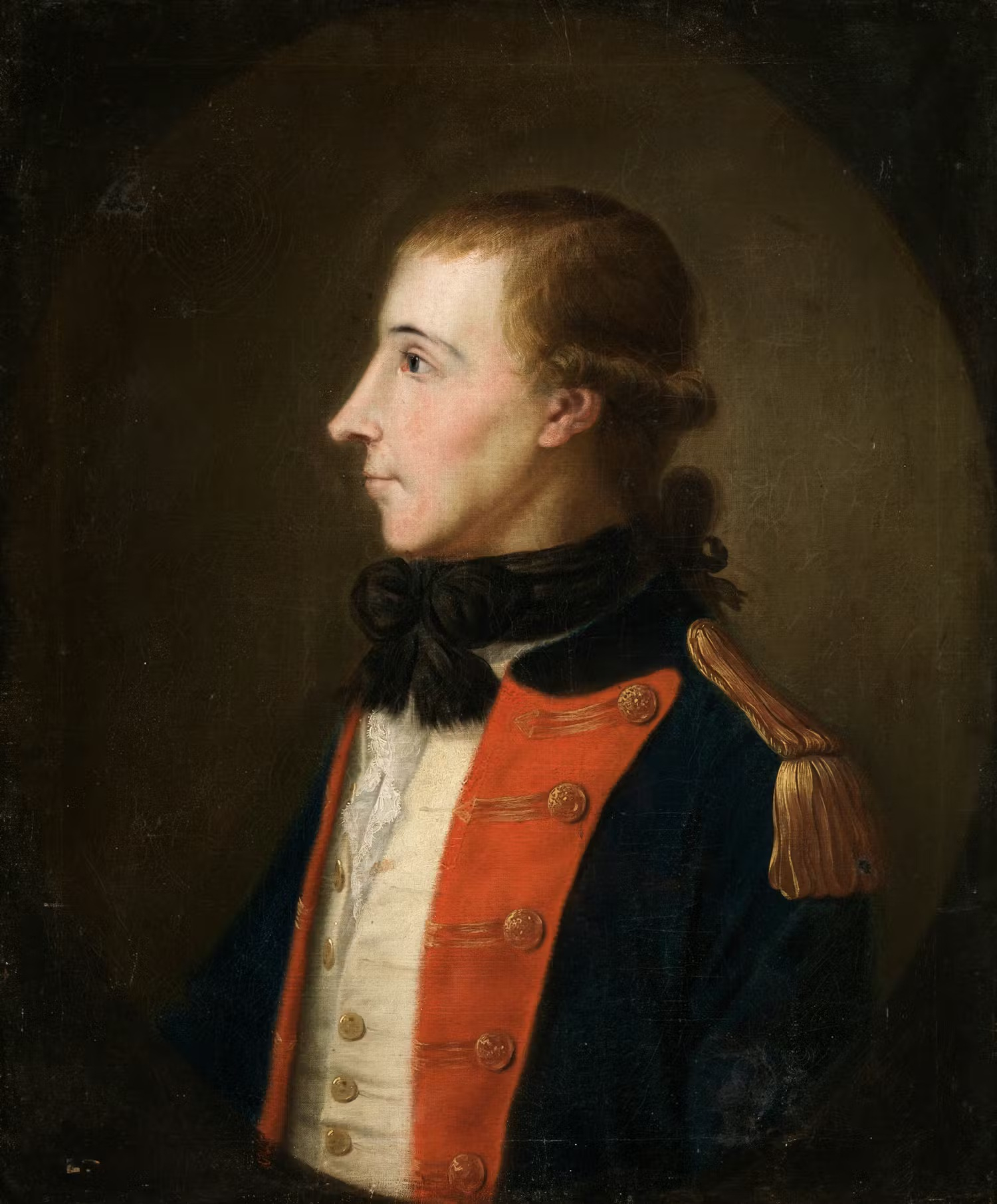
Wolfe Tone: "Reform, the Catholics, justice and liberty . . . or an unconditional submission".

Thomas Russell had invited Tone to the Belfast gathering in October 1791 as the author of An Argument on behalf of the Catholics of Ireland. In honour of the reformers in Belfast, who arranged for the publication of 10,000 copies, this had been signed A Northern Whig. Being purportedly of French Huguenot descent, Tone may have had an instinctive empathy for the religiously persecuted, but he was "suspicious of the Catholics priests" and hostile to what he saw as "Papal tyranny". (In 1798 Tone applauded Napoleon's deposition and imprisonment of Pope Pius VI).

For Tone the argument on behalf of the Catholics was political. The "imaginary Revolution of 1782" had failed to secure a representative and national government for Ireland because Protestants had refused to make common cause with Catholics. In Belfast, the objections to doing so were rehearsed for him again by the Reverend William Bruce. Bruce spoke of the danger of "throwing power into hands" of Catholics who were "incapable of enjoying and extending liberty," and whose first interest would be to reclaim their forfeited lands.

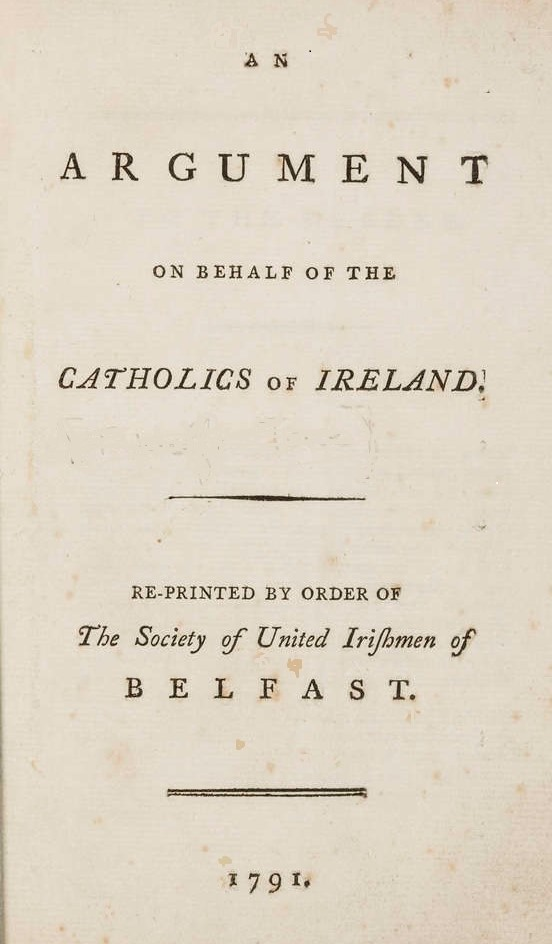

In his Argument Tone insisted that, as a matter of justice, men cannot be denied rights because an incapacity, whether ignorance or intemperance, for which the laws under which they are made to live are themselves responsible. History, in any case, was reassuring: when they had the opportunity in the Parliament summoned by James II in 1689, and clearer title to what had been forfeit not ninety but forty years before (in the Cromwellian Settlement), Catholics did not insist upon a wholesale return of their lost estates. As to the existing Irish Parliament "where no Catholic can by law appear", it was the clearest proof that "Protestantism is no guard against corruption".

Tone cited the examples of the American Congress and French National Assembly where "Catholic and Protestant sit equally" and of the Polish Constitution of May 1791 (also celebrated in Belfast) with its promise of amity between Catholic, Protestant and Jew. If Irish Protestants remained "illiberal" and "blind" to these precedents, Ireland would continue to be governed in the exclusive interests of England and of the landed Ascendancy.

The Belfast Catholic Society sought to underscore Tone's argument. Meeting in April 1792 they declared their "highest ambition" was "to participate in the constitution" of the kingdom, and disclaimed even "the most distant thought of [...] unsettling the landed property thereof".

On Bastille Day 1792 in Belfast, the United Irishmen (identified by the town's loyalists as "Croppies" for their hair cropped and un-powdered in the anti-aristocratic French style) had occasion to make their position clear. In a public debate on An Address to the People of Ireland, William Bruce and others proposed hedging the commitment to an equality of "all sects and denominations of Irishmen". They had rather anticipate "the gradual emancipation of our Roman Catholic brethren" staggered in line with Protestant concerns for security and with improving Catholic education. Samuel Neilson "expressed his astonishment at hearing... any part of the address called a Catholic question." The only question was "whether Irishmen should be free." William Steel Dickson, with "keen irony", wondered whether Catholics were to ascend the "ladder" to liberty "by intermarrying with the wise and capable Protestants, and particularly with us Presbyterians, [so that] they may amend the breed, and produce a race of beings who will inherit the capacity from us?"

The amendment was defeated, but the debate reflected a growing division in Ulster. The call for Catholic emancipation might find support in Belfast and surrounding Protestant-majority districts where already in 1784, admitting Catholics, Volunteers had begun to form "united companies". In the Plantation counties west of the River Bann, where a Protestant minority had bitter memories of the Catholic rebellion of 1641, veterans of the Volunteer movement were not as easily persuaded. The Armagh Volunteers, who had called a Volunteer Convention in 1779, boycotted a third in 1793. Under Ascendancy patronage they were already moving along with the Peep o' Day Boys, battling Catholic Defenders in rural districts for tenancies and employment, toward the formation in 1795 of the loyalist Orange Order.

=== Equal representation ===
In 1793, the Government itself breached the principle of an exclusively Protestant Constitution. Dublin Castle put its weight behind Grattan in the passage of a Catholic Relief Act. Catholics were admitted to the franchise (but not yet to Parliament itself) on the same terms as Protestants. This courted Catholic opinion, but it also put Protestant reformers on notice. Any further liberalising of the franchise, whether by expunging the pocket boroughs or by lowering the property threshold, would advance the prospect of a Catholic majority. Outside of Ulster and Dublin City, in 1793 the only popular resolution in favour of "a reform" of the Irish Commons to include "persons of all religious persuasion" was from freeholders gathered in Wexford town.

Beyond the inclusion of Catholics and a re-distribution of seats, Tone and Russell protested that it was unclear what members were pledging themselves to in Drennan's original "test": "an impartial and adequate representation of the Irish nation in parliament" was too vague and compromising. But within two years, the Dublin society had agreed on reforms that went beyond the dispensation they had celebrated in the French Constitution of 1791. In February 1794, they published, in the Dublin Evening Post and the Northern Star, a call for universal manhood suffrage. In the exercise of political rights, property, like religion, was to be excluded from consideration.

The new democratic programme was consistent with the transformation of the society into a broad popular movement. Thomas Addis Emmet recorded an influx of "mechanics [artisans, journeymen and their apprentices], petty shopkeepers and farmers". In Belfast, Derry, other towns in the North, and in Dublin, some of these had been maintaining their own Jacobin Clubs.

Writing to her brother, William Drennan, in 1795 Martha McTier describes the "Irish Jacobins" as an established democratic party in Belfast [they had issued an address calling for a universal franchise in December 1792] composed of "persons and rank long kept down" and [although joined in their proceedings by well-to-do United Irishmen such as the banker William Tennant],chaired by a "radical mechanick" (sic).

When April 1795 the new Lord Lieutenant, Earl Fitzwilliam, after publicly urging Catholic admission to parliament was recalled and replaced by Ascendancy hard-liner, Earl Camden, these low-ranked clubists entered United Irish societies in still greater numbers. With the Rev. Kelburn (much admired by Tone as a fervent democrat), they doubted that there "was any such thing" as Ireland's "much boasted constitution", and had urged their "fellow-citizens of every denomination in Ireland, England, and Scotland," to pursue "radical and complete Parliamentary reform" through national conventions. In May, delegates in Belfast representing 72 societies in Down and Antrim rewrote Drennan's test to pledge members to "an equal, full and adequate representation of all the people of Ireland", and to drop the reference to the Irish Parliament (with its Lords and Commons).

This Painite radicalism had been preceded by an upsurge in trade union activity. In 1792 the Northern Star reported a "bold and daring spirit of combination" (long in evidence in Dublin) appearing in Belfast and surrounding districts. Breaking out first among cotton weavers, it then communicated to the bricklayers, carpenters and other trades. In the face of "demands made in a tumultuous and illegal manner", Samuel Neilson (who had pledged his woollen business to the paper) proposed that the Volunteers assist the authorities in enforcing the laws against combination. James (Jemmy) Hope, a self educated weaver, who joined the Society in 1796, nonetheless was to account Neilson, along with Russell (who in the Star positively urged unions for labourers and cottiers), McCracken, and Emmet, the only United Irish leaders "perfectly" understood the real causes of social disorder and conflict: "the conditions of the labouring class".

Observing that property was "merely the collection of labour", in a handbill of March 1794 Dublin United Irishmen had argued that "the scattered labour of the lowest ranks" was "as real and ought to be as really represented" as the "fixed and solid property" that presently monopolised Parliament. In offering manhood suffrage, it made a direct appeal to these ranks, "the poorer classes of the community":

Are you overloaded with burdens you are but little able to bear? Do you feel many grievances, which it would be too tedious, and might be unsafe, to mention? Believe us, they can be redressed by such reform as will give you your just proportion of influence in the legislature, AND BY SUCH A MEASURE ONLY.

In the "explosion" of handbills, pamphlets and newspapers in 1790s, a small number of tracts "directly addressed economic inequalities". Union doctrine; or Poor man's catechism (1796?) proposed he confiscating the lands of the Established Church to finance care for pregnant women and the elderly, and education for the young.

As a body, however, United Irishmen did not propose the forms that such redress might take in a democratic national assembly. Operating on the principle that they should "attend those things in which we all agree, [and] to exclude those in which we differ", the Society did not itself tie the prospect of popular suffrage to an economic or social programme. Beyond the disclaimer of wholesale Catholic restitution, the Society advanced no scheme or principle of land reform; in Tone's recollection it never "entertained" ideas of "an agrarian law". Jemmy Hope might be clear that this should not be "a delusive fixity of tenure [that allows] the landlord to continue to draw the last potato out of the warm ashes of the poor man's fire".But for the great rural mass of the Irish people this was an existential question upon which neither he nor any central resolution spoke for the Society.

=== Women ===
Martha McTier, "'Tis only the Rich are alarmed, or the guilty. I am neither."

As were the Presbyteries, Volunteer companies and Masonic lodges through which they recruited, the United Irishmen were a male fraternity. In serialising William Godwin's Enquiry Concerning political Justice (1793), the Northern Star had advised them of the moral and intellectual enlightenment found in an "equal and liberal intercourse" between men and women. The paper had also reviewed and commended Mary Wollstonecraft's A Vindication of the Rights of Woman (1792). But the call was not made for women's civic and political emancipation. In publishing excerpts from Wollstonecraft's work, the Star focussed entirely upon issues of female education.

In the rival News Letter, William Bruce argued that this was disingenuous: the "impartial representation of the Irish nation" the United Irishmen embraced in their test or oath implied, he argued, not only equality for Catholics but also that "every woman, in short every rational being shall have equal weight in electing representatives". Drennan did not seek to disabuse Bruce as to "the principle" – he had never seen "a good argument against the right of women to vote". But in a plea that recalled objections to immediate Catholic emancipation, he argued for a "common sense" reading of the test of which he was the author. It might be some generations, he proposed, before "habits of thought, and the artificial ideas of education" are so "worn out" that it would appear "natural" that women should exercise the same rights as men, and so attain their "full and proper influence in the world".

In Belfast Drennan's sister Martha McTier and McCracken's sister Mary-Ann, and in Dublin Emmett's sister Mary Anne Holmes and Margaret King, shared in the reading of Wollstonecraft and of other progressive women writers. As had Tone on behalf of Catholics, Wollstonecraft argued that the incapacities alleged to deny women equality were those that law and usage themselves impose. Mary Ann McCracken, in particular, was articulate in taking to heart the conclusion that women had to reject "their present abject and dependent situation" and secure the liberty without which they could "neither possess virtue or happiness".

Women formed associations within the movement. In October 1796 the Northern Star published a letter from the secretary of the Society of United Irishwomen. This blamed the English, who made war on the new republics, for the violence of the American and French Revolutions. Denounced as a "violent republican", Martha McTier was the immediate suspect, but denied any knowledge of the society. The true author may have been her friend Jane Greg, described by informants as "very active" in Belfast "at the head of the Female Societies" (and by General Lake as being "the most violent creature possible").

Mary Ann McCracken took Drennan's test but stood aloof from the "female societies." No women with "rational ideas of liberty and equality for themselves", she objected, could consent to a separate organisation. There could be "no other reason having them separate, but keeping the women in the dark" and making "tools of them".

In final months before the rising, the paper of the Dublin society, The Press, published two direct addresses to Irish women, both of which "appealed to women as members of a critically-debating public": the first signed Philoguanikos (probably the paper's founder, Arthur O'Connor), the second signed Marcus (Drennan).While both appealed to women to take sides, Philoguanikos was clear that women were being asked to act as political beings. He scorns those "brainless bedlams [who] scream in abhorrence of the idea of a female politician". Among those who took the Society test in response to the appeal were the writers Margaret King and Henrietta Battier (later hailed, by R. R. Madden, as "the Sappho" of the movement).

The letters of Martha McTier and Mary Ann McCracken testify to the role of women as confidantes, sources of advice and bearers of intelligence. R.R. Madden, one of the earliest historians of the United Irishmen, describes various of their activities in the person of an appropriately named Mrs. Risk. By 1797 the Castle informer Francis Higgins was reporting that "women are equally sworn with men" suggesting that some of the women assuming risks for the United Irish cause were taking places beside men in an increasingly clandestine organisation. Middle-class women, such as Mary Moore, who administered the Drennan's test to William James MacNeven, were reportedly active in the Dublin United Irishmen.

On the role in the movement of peasant and other working women there are fewer sources. But in the 1798 uprising they came forward in many capacities, some, as celebrated in later ballads (Betsy Gray and Brave Mary Doyle, the Heroine of New Ross), as combatants. Under the command of Henry Luttrell, Earl Carhampton (who, in a celebrated case in 1788, Archibald Hamilton Rowan had accused of child rape), troops treated women, young and old, with great brutality.

== Spread and radicalisation ==
=== Jacobins, Masons and Covenanters ===
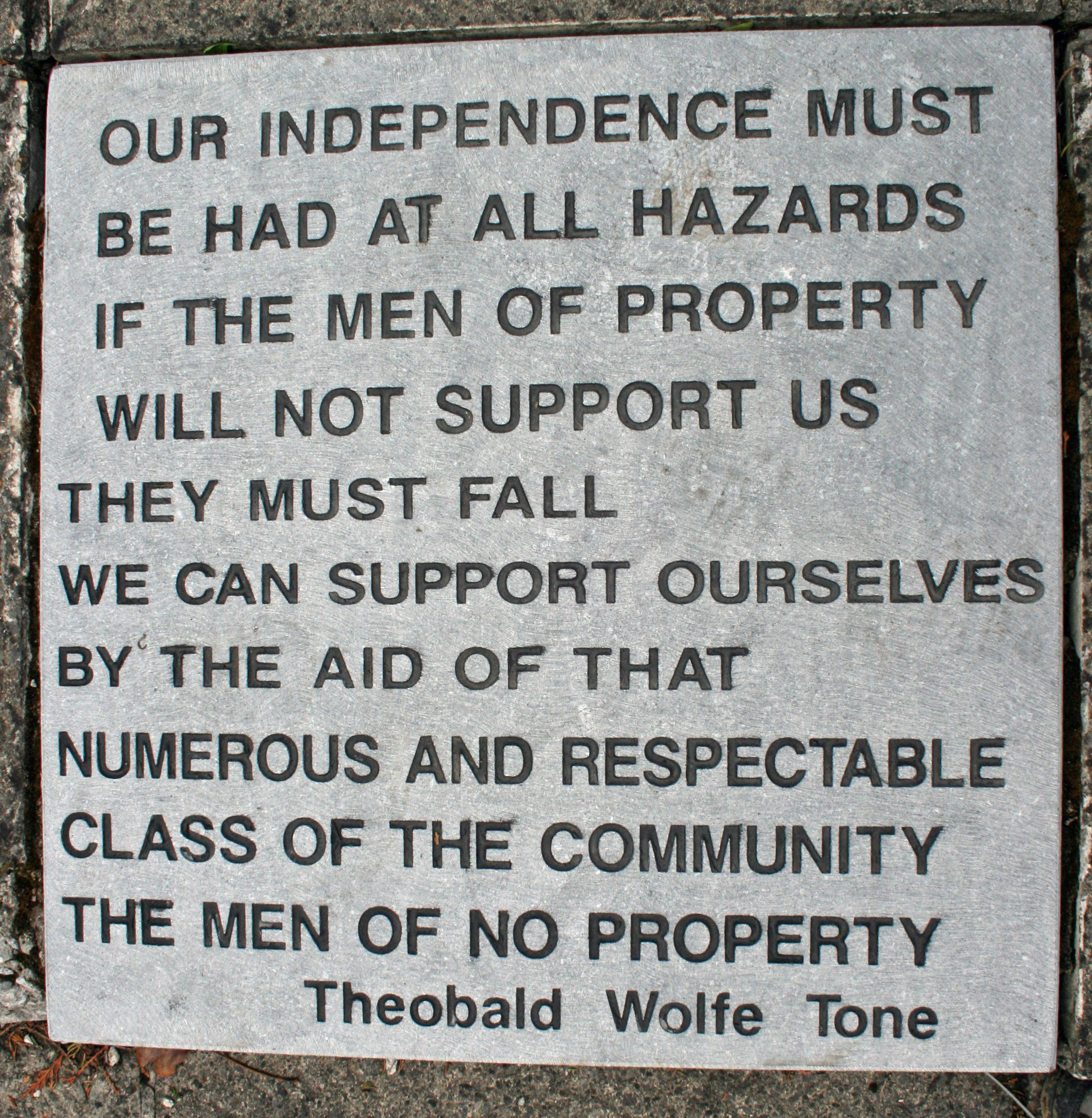
Inscription, Bodenstown

Jacques-Louis de Bougrenet de La Tocnaye, a French émigré who walked the length and breadth of Ireland in 1796–97, was appalled to encounter in a cabin upon the banks of the lower Bann the same "nonsense on which the people of France fed themselves before the Revolution". A young labourer treated him to a disposition on "equality, fraternity, and oppression", "reform of Parliament", "abuses in elections", and "tolerance", and such "philosophical discourse" as he had heard from "foppish talkers" in Paris a decade before. In 1793, a magistrate in that same area, near Coleraine, County Londonderry, had been complaining of "daily incursions of disaffected people... disseminating the most seditious principles".Until his arrest in September 1796, Thomas Russell (later celebrated in popular ballad written by Florence Mary Wilson as The man from God-knows-where) was one such agitator. Recruiting for the Society, he ranged from Belfast as far as Counties Donegal and Sligo.

In recruiting the first societies among the tenant farmers and market-townsmen of north Down and Antrim, Jemmy Hope made conscious appeal to what he called "the republican spirit" of resistance "inherent in the principles of Presbyterian community". While presbyteries were divided politically, as they were theologically, leadership was found among church ministers and their elders, and not least from those who were foremost in championing the Scottish Covenanting tradition. Of those who – bowing to "no king but Jesus" – were elected to preach by the Reformed Presbytery in Ulster, it is estimated that half were implicated in the eventual rebellion. In Antrim thousands filled fields to hear the itinerant Reformed preacher William Gibson prophesy – in the tradition that saw the Antichrist defeated in the overthrow of the Catholic Church in France – the "immediate destruction of the British monarchy". On the pages of the Northern Star, which made a conscious appeal to the millenarianism of orthodox or Old Light Dissenters, Gibson was joined by Thomas Ledlie Birch of Saintfield who (while adhering to the Synod of Ulster) likewise anticipated the "overthrow of the Beast".

Allies were also found in the growing network of Masonic lodges. Although it was the rule that "no politics must be brought within the doors of the Lodge", masons were involved in the Volunteer movement and their lodges remained "a battleground for political ideas". As United Irishmen increasingly attracted the unwelcome attention of Dublin Castle and its network of informants, masonry did become both a cover and a model. Drennan, himself a mason, from the outset had anticipated that his "conspiracy" would have "much of the secrecy and somewhat of the ceremonial of Free-Masonry".

=== The New System ===
From February 1793, the Crown was at war with the French Republic. This led immediately to heightened tensions in Belfast. On 9 March, a body of dragoons rampaged through the town, purportedly provoked by taverns displaying the likenesses of Dumouriez, Mirabeau and Franklin. They withdrew to barracks when, as related by Martha McTier, about 1,000 armed countrymen came into the town and mustered at McCracken's Third Presbyterian. Further "military provocations" saw attacks on the homes of Neilson and others associated with the Northern Star (wrecked for the final time, and closed, in May 1797). Legislation impressed from Westminster banned extra-parliamentary conventions and suppressed the Volunteers, by then largely a northern movement. They were replaced by a paid militia, its ranks partially filled with conscripted Catholics, and by Yeomanry, an auxiliary force led by local gentry. In May 1794 the Society itself was proscribed.

The difficulties posed by the repression were "compounded" by the news from France. Increasingly, this persuaded liberal middle-class opinion of a link between "the march of democracy" and the guillotine.

Undaunted, those committed to the pro-French Painite line drafted a constitution for a "new system". Approved in May 1795 by a Belfast conference of Down and Antrim societies, it sought to reconcile the democratic principles of the republic to come with the requirements of a coordinated, clandestine, organisation. Local societies were to split and replicate so as to remain within a range of 7 to 35 members, and, through delegate conferences, to commission a new five-man provincial directory. Selection to this "committee of public welfare" was by ballot, but in order to preserve secrecy, returning officers were sworn to inform only those elected of the results. Together with directors' capacity to co-opt additional members, this implied an executive free to take its own counsel.

In June 1795, four members of the Ulster executive – Neilson, Russell, McCracken and Robert Simms – met with Tone as he passed through Belfast en route to America and atop Cave Hill swore their celebrated oath "never to desist in our efforts until we had subverted the authority of England over our country, and asserted our independence'". In months that followed, while Tone (travelling via Philadelphia to Paris) lobbied for French assistance, they directed the creation of a shadow military organisation. Under elective command, each society was to drill a company, three companies were to form a battalion, and ten battalions, representing thirty societies, were to coordinate, under a "colonel", as a regiment. From a shortlist drawn up by the colonels, the executive would then appoint an adjutant-general for the county.

=== Alliance with the Catholic Defenders ===
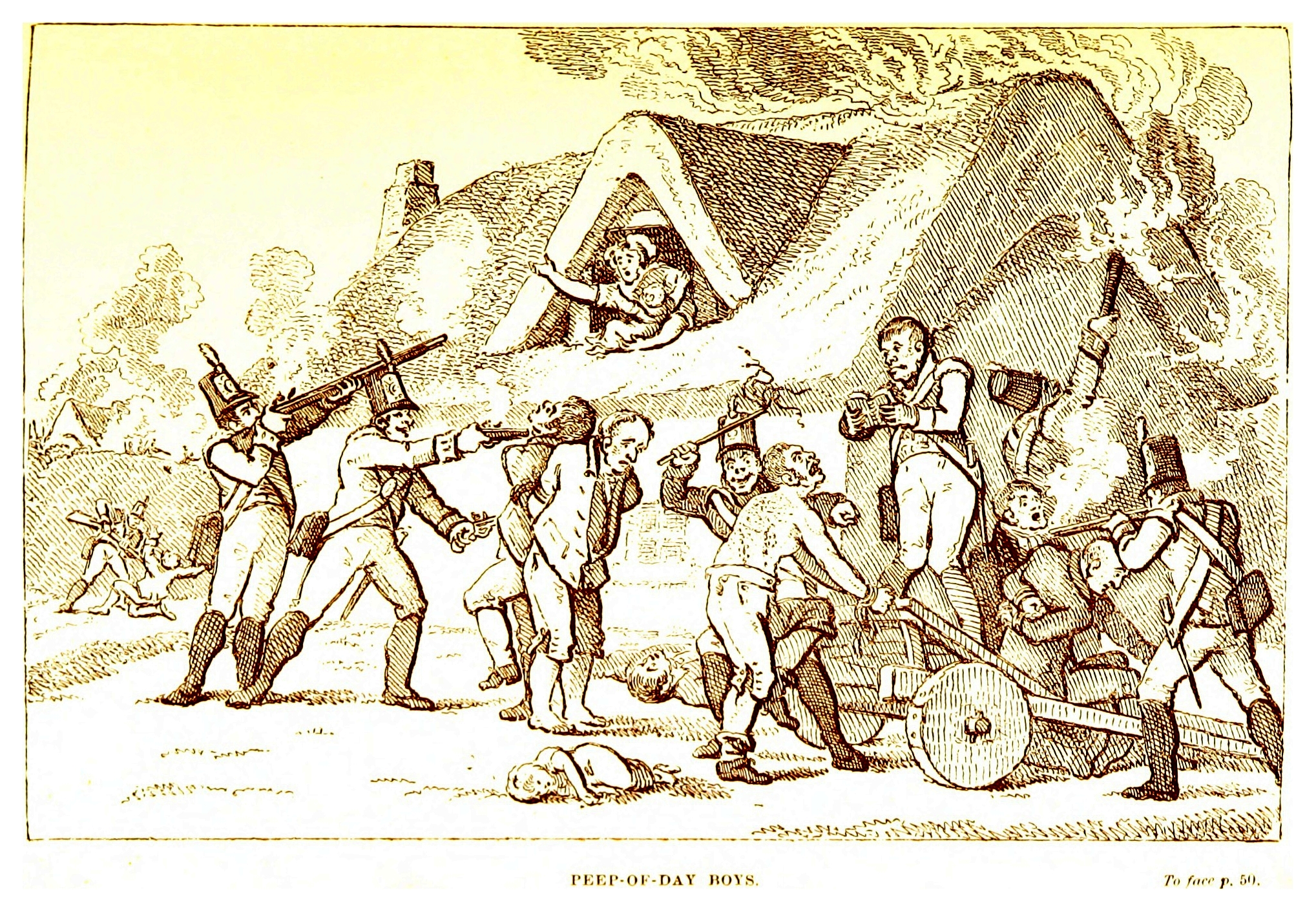
Cartoon entitled 'Peep O' Day Boys' (Daly's Ireland in'98) (1888) (but as the villains are in uniform, more plausibly their allies, Lord Charlemont's Volunteers)

Aware that many of those who had lent their names to the original reform project recoiled from the prospect of insurrection, in March 1796 Tone recorded his understanding of the new resolve: "Our independence must be had at all hazards. If the men of property will not support us, they must fall; we can support ourselves by the aid of that numerous and respectable class of the community, the men of no property".

The greatest body, existing, of men of no property, and with whom alliance was to be sought if a union of Protestant, Catholic and Dissenter was to take to the field, were the Defenders. A vigilante response to Peep O'Day raids upon Catholic homes in the mid-1780s, by the early 1790s the Defenders (drawing, like the United Irishmen, on the lodge structure of the Masons) were a secret oath-bound fraternity ranging across Ulster and the Irish midlands. Despite their professed loyalism (members had originally to swear allegiance to the King) Defenderism developed an increasingly seditious character. Talk in the lodges was of a release from tithes, rents and taxes, and of a French invasion that might allow the repossession of Protestant estates. Arms-buying delegations were sent to London.

Defenders and United Irishmen began to seek one another out. Religion was not a bar to joining the Defenders, and closer ties began take the form of joint membership. In Dublin, in particular, where the Defenderism appealed strongly to a significant body of radical artisans and shopkeepers, Protestants (Napper Tandy prominent among them) joined in the determination to make common cause. Early in 1796, the Dublin Defenders sent a delegation to Belfast for the purpose of laying a "foundation" for a union between parties that, while equally hostile to the state, had been "kept wholly distinct".

Oaths, catechisms and articles of association supplied to Dublin Castle nonetheless suggest the Defenders were developing a kind of Catholic liberation theology – their own version of Gibson's millenarianism. Apocalyptic biblical allusions and calls to "plant the true religion" sat uneasily with the rhetoric of inalienable rights and fealty to a "United States of France and Ireland". Oblivious to the anti-clericalism of the French Republic, many Defender rank-and-file viewed the French through a Jacobite, not Jacobin, lens, as Catholics at war with Protestants. Although Hope and McCracken did much to reach out to the Defenders, recognising the sectarian tensions (Simms reported to Tone that "it would take a great deal of exertion" to keep the Defenders from "producing feuds"), the Belfast Executive chose emissaries from its small number of Catholics.

With their brother-in-law John Magennis, in 1795 the United Irish brothers, Bartholomew and Charles Teeling, sons of a wealthy Catholic linen manufacturer in Lisburn, appear to have had command over the Down, Antrim and Armagh Defenders. United Irishmen were able to offer practical assistance: legal counsel, aid and refuge. Catholic victims of the Armagh disturbances and of the Battle of the Diamond (at which Charles Teeling had been present) were sheltered on Presbyterian farms in Down and Antrim, and the goodwill earned used to open the Defenders to trusted republicans. Emmet records these as being able to convince Defenders of something they had only "vaguely" considered, namely the need to separate Ireland from England and to secure its "real as well as nominal independence".

What was decisive, however, was not their agreed political programme: final emancipation and a complete reform of representation. From Dungannon, where he had command, General John Knox, reported that local republicans had been "obliged to throw in the bait of the Abolition of Tithes, Reduction of Rents etc.". Nothing less would rouse "the lower orders of Roman Catholics" (and nothing less, he suggested, would in time reconcile them to the alternative to separation, a union with Great Britain).

=== Dublin and the Catholic Committee ===
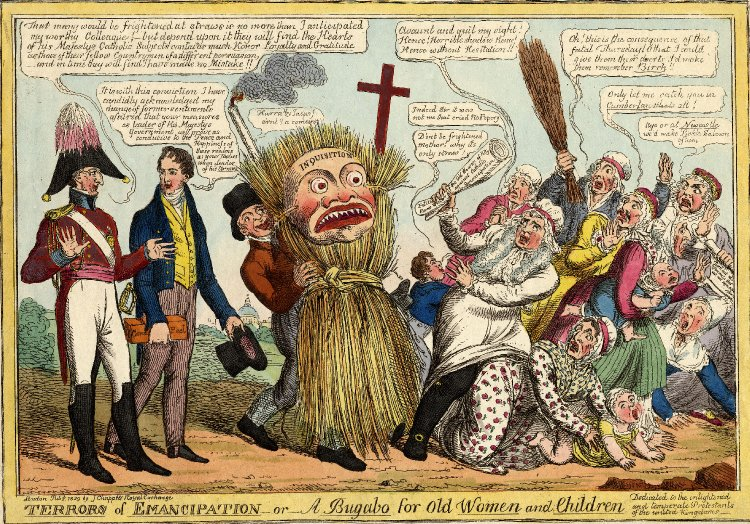
"Terrors of Emancipation" – The final Roman Catholic Relief Act, 1829

The Society that Tone had helped establish with Drennan in Dublin on his return from Belfast in November 1791 held themselves aloof from the Jacobin, Defender and other radical clubs in the capital. The city's United men also shied away from the New System adopted in Ulster. Whereas Belfast had 16 societies in 1795 (and 80 by the spring of 1797), Dublin, with ten times the population, maintained just one general society comprising, at its height in March 1793, 350 to 400 members.

From the outset, the Dublin society had been distinguished by the presence of those described by Edmund Burke as the "new race of Catholics": representatives of the emergent Catholic mercantile and professional middle class. Among them were prominent members of the Catholic Committee, including its chairman John Keogh. With Tone as his accompanying secretary, in January 1793 Keogh had led a Committee delegation to London where they had an audience with the king. The Catholic Relief Act followed in April. Having only acquired such recognition, many were loath to abandon the appearance of strict constitutionality. Announcing that there were paid informers in their midst, as early as January 1794 Neilson had urged the Dublin society to re-form on the Ulster model. In October there was discussion of a society of sections of 15 members each, each society returning one representative to a central committee. But the idea of coordinating behind closed doors was rejected on the grounds that "the United Irishmen, as a legal, constitutional reform movement, would not engage in any activity which could not bear the scrutiny of the public or the Castle".

Keogh's dismissal of Edmund Burke's son, Richard Burke, as Committee secretary in 1792, and his replacement by Tone, a known democrat, did suggest a political shift. The British Prime Minister Pitt was already canvassing support for a union of Ireland and Great Britain in which Catholics could be freely – because securely – admitted to Parliament. London might yet be an ally in relieving Catholics of the last of the Penal Law restrictions, but it would be as a permanent minority in the enlarged Kingdom, not as a national majority in Ireland. Even that prospect was uncertain. Although tempered since the Gordon Riots, Anti-Popery remained an important strain in English politics. Meanwhile, Drennan recalls, "Catholics were being driven to despair" and were prepared to "go to extremities" rather than again be denied political equality.

Drennan was nonetheless sceptical of Catholic intentions. Suspecting that their object remained "selfish" (i.e. focused on emancipation rather than on separation and democratic reform) and recognizing their alarm at the anti-clericalism of the French Republic, Drennan, up until his trial for sedition in May 1794, promoted what he called an "inner Society" in Dublin, "Protestant but National".

In April 1794, matters were brought to a head by the arrest of the Reverend William Jackson. An agent of the French Committee of Public Safety, Jackson had been having meetings with Tone in the prison cell of Archibald Hamilton Rowan. Whether because of his association with the Catholic Committee or his family's connections, Tone was allowed to go into American exile, while Rowan, who was serving time for distributing Drennan's seditious appeal to Volunteers, managed to flee the country. The scandal induced Thomas Troy, Catholic Archbishop of Dublin and Papal legate, to caution against the "fascinating illusions" of French principles and, in advance of the Society's proscription, to threaten any Catholic taking the United test with excommunication.

Lingering hopes of a return to open agitation and of further concessions were dashed in March the following year when, after endorsing Catholic admission to Parliament, the newly arrived Lord Lieutenant, William Fitzwilliam was summarily recalled.

Encouraged by the presence in Dublin of veterans of the northern movement, such as Samuel Nielson, Thomas Russell, and James Hope, members of the Dublin society regrouped with previously neglected lower-rank Jacobins and Defenders. A series of ephemeral organisations (The Philanthropic Society, the Huguenots, the Illuminati, the Druids' Lodges...) were used as a cover for their activities in Dublin and for the spread of the movement into the provinces. The result was the creation, in stark contrast to the original society, of a mass-based organization. Concentrated in the poorer, western quarters of the city, by May 1798 a new United Irish coalition claimed some 10,000 members (and another 9,000 in Dublin county).

=== Mobilisation and repression ===
On 15 December 1796, Tone arrived off Bantry Bay with a French fleet carrying about 14,450 men, and a large supply of war material, under the command of Louis Lazare Hoche. A gale prevented a landing. Hoche's unexpected death on his return to France was a blow to what had been Tone's adept handling of the politics of the French Directory. With the forces (and ambition) that might have allowed a second attempt upon Ireland, Hoche's rival, Napoleon, sailed in May 1798 for Egypt.

Bantry Bay nonetheless made real the prospect of French intervention for which it was clear the forces available to the Crown were unprepared. At the same time, the government was shutting down attempts at political conciliation. In the new year, it announced that any further discussion in parliament of grievances serving in the country as "pretexts for treasonable practices" would result in adjournment.

In April 1797, William Orr was charged under the Insurrection Act with administering the United test to two soldiers. The movement's first acclaimed martyr, he was hanged in October. Orr's arrest in Antrim signalled the onset of General Lake's "dragooning of Ulster". For the authorities its urgency was underscored by public expressions of solidarity with those detained. The Northern Star reported that after Orr was detained, between five and six hundred of his neighbours assembled and brought in his entire harvest. When Samuel Nielson was taken in September, fifteen hundred people were said to have dug his potatoes in seven minutes. Such "hasty diggings" (traditionally accorded by families visited by misfortune) often occasioned mustering and drilling – men, shouldering their spades, marching four to six deep accompanied by the sounding of horns. In May 1797, Yeomanry and Fencibles charged one such gathering near Cootehill in Cavan killing eleven and injuring many more.

With his troops' reputation for half-hanging, pitch-capping and other interrogative refinements travelling before him, at the end of 1797 Lake tuned his attention to disarming Leinster and Munster. With a license to "treat the people with as much harshness as possible" and to dragoon young men into militia service, Lake broke the movement in Munster. In May 1797, the entire committee of the relatively strong United organisation that the Sheares brothers (witnesses to the execution of Louis XVI) had built in Cork City were arrested.. But in Leinster the new system took hold. The various republican clubs and cover lodges, and much of Defender network, were marshalled through delegate committees under a provincial executive in Dublin Among others who were to serve on the executive were Thomas Addis Emmet; Richard McCormick, Tone's replacement as secretary to the Catholic Committee; the Sheares brothers and two disillusioned parliamentary patriots: the future Napoleonic general Arthur O'Connor and the popular Lord Edward Fitzgerald.

== "Unionising" in Britain ==
"Preparing for French Invasion". United Scotsmen 1797

=== United Scotsmen ===
The war with France was also used to crush reformers in Great Britain, costing the United Irishmen the liberty of friends and allies. In 1793 in Edinburgh, Thomas Muir, whom Rowan and Drennan had feted in Dublin, with three other of his Friends of the People were sentenced to transportation to Botany Bay (Australia). The judge seized on Muir's connection to the "ferocious" Mr. Rowan (Rowan had challenged Robert Dundas, the Lord Advocate of Scotland, to a duel) and on the United Irishmen papers found in his possession.

There followed in England the 1794 Treason Trials and, when these collapsed, the 1795 Treason Act and Seditious Meetings Act. The measures were directed at the activities of the London Corresponding Society and other radical groups among whom, as ambassadors for the Irish cause, Roger O'Connor and Jane Greg had been cultivating understanding and support.

In the face of the repression, sections of the democratic movement in both Scotland and in England began to regard universal suffrage and annual parliaments as a cause for physical force. Political tours by United Irishmen in the winter of 1796–7, and as conditions deteriorated in Ulster a growing tide of migrants, helped to promote such thinking and foster an interest in establishing societies on the new model Irish example.

When the authorities first became aware of the United Scotsmen early in 1797, in their view it was as little more than a Scottish branch of the United Irishmen. The Resolutions and Constitution of the United Scotsmen (1797) was "a verbatim copy of the constitutional document of the United Irishmen, apart from the substitution of the words 'North Britain' for 'Irishmen'". At their height, during a summer of anti-militia riots, the United Scotsmen counted upwards of 10,000 members, the backbone formed (as had increasingly been the case for Belfast and Dublin societies) by artisan journeymen and weavers.

=== United Englishmen, United Britons ===
With the encouragement of Irish and Scottish visitors, the manufacturing districts of northern England saw the first cells of the United Englishmen formed in late 1796. Their clandestine proceedings, oath-taking, and advocacy of physical force "mirrored that of their Irish inspirators", and they followed the Ulster system of parish-based cells (societies capped at thirty or thirty-six).

Describing himself as an emissary of the United Irish executive, the Catholic priest James Coigly (a veteran of unionising activities during the Armagh Disturbances) worked from Manchester with James Dixon, a cotton spinner from Belfast, to spread the United system to Stockport, Bolton, Warrington and Birmingham. In London, Coigly conferred with those Irishmen who had hastened the radicalisation of the London Corresponding Society: among them United Irishman Edward Despard, brothers Benjamin and John Binns, and LCS president Alexander Galloway. Meetings were held at which delegates from London, Scotland and the regions resolved "to overthrow the present Government, and to join the French as soon as they made a landing in England".

The resolution of the "United Britons" was discussed by the Irish leaders in Dublin in July 1797. Although addressed to the prospect of French assistance, in Ulster the suggestion that "England, Scotland and Ireland are all one people acting for one common cause", encouraged militants to believe that liberty could be won even if "the French should never come here".

At the end of February 1798, as he was about to embark on a return mission to Paris, Coigly was arrested carrying to the French Directory a further address from the United Britons. While its suggestion of a mass movement primed for insurrection was scarcely credible, it was deemed sufficient proof of the intention to induce a French invasion. The United movement in Britain was broken up by internment and Coigly was hanged.

=== Alleged role in the 1797 naval mutinies ===
In justifying the suspension of habeas corpus the authorities were more than ready to see the hand not only of English radicals but also, in the large Irish contingent among the sailors, of United Irishmen in the Spithead and Nore mutinies of April and May 1797. The United Irish were reportedly behind the resolution of the Nore mutineers to hand the fleet over to the French "as the only government that understands the Rights of Man". Much was made of Valentine Joyce, a leader at Spithead, described by Edmund Burke as a "seditious Belfast clubist" (and recorded by R. R. Madden as having been an Irish Volunteer in 1778).

That the Valentine Joyce in question was Irish and a republican has been disputed, and while that "rebellious paper, the Northern Star" may have circulated as reported among the mutineers, no evidence has emerged of a concerted United Irish plot to subvert the fleet. In Ireland there was talk of seizing British warships as part of a general insurrection, but it was only after the Spithead and Nore mutinies that United Irishmen awoke to the effectiveness of formulating sedition within the Royal Navy.

There were a number of mutinies instigated by Irish sailors in 1798. Aboard HMS Defiance a court martial took evidence of oaths of allegiance to the United Irishmen and sentenced eleven men to hang.

== 1798 Rebellion ==
=== The call from Dublin ===
Militia pitch-capping in County Kildare, 1798

The movement never realised the national directory envisaged in the constitution of May 1795. Its leadership remained split between the executives of the two organised provinces, Ulster and Leinster. In June 1797, they met together in Dublin to consider northern demands for an immediate rising. The meeting broke up in disarray, with many of the Ulster delegates, fearful of arrest, fleeing abroad. In the north, the United societies had not recovered from their decapitation the previous September through the arrests (personally supervised by Castlereagh) that, in addition to Neilson, had netted Thomas Russell, Charles Teeling, Henry Joy McCracken and Robert Simms. Their removal had opened up the leadership in Belfast to less reliable elements, including government informants.

The initiative passed to the Leinster directory. The southern organisation remained too weak in the summer of 1797 to respond to the call for immediate action. But in the winter of 1797–98, its organisation consolidated in existing strongholds such as Dublin, Kildare and Meath, and broke new ground in the midlands and the south-east. In February 1798, a return prepared by Fitzgerald computed the number United Irishmen, nationwide, at 269,896. It is certain that the figure was not a measure of the number prepared to turn out, particularly in the absence of the French. Most would have been able to arm themselves only with simple pikes. In same month, the French Directory deposed and imprisoned Pope Pius VI and proclaimed the Roman Republic, hardening the opposition of the Irish hierarchy to the republican conspiracy. The Catholic bishops were almost totally united in their condemnation of disaffection, and voiced no criticism of government policy of "the bayonet, the gibbet, and the lash". The movement, nonetheless, had withstood the government's countermeasures, and seditious propaganda and preparation continued.

In March 1798, almost the entire Leinster provincial committee were seized along with two directors, William James MacNeven and Thomas Addis Emmet, together with all their papers. Faced with the breaking-up of their entire system, Fitzgerald, joined by Neilson who had been released in ill health from Kilmainham Prison, and the Sheares brothers, resolved on a general uprising for 23 May. The United army in Dublin was to seize strategic points in the city, while the armies in the surrounding counties would throw up a cordon and advance into its centre. As soon as these developments were signalled by halting mail coaches from the capital, the rest of the country was to rise.

On the appointed day the signal was duly given, but the rising in the city was aborted. The Yeomanry had been forewarned; Fitzgerald had been mortally wounded on the 19th, and on the morning of the 23rd, Neilson, who had been critical to the planning, was seized. Tens of thousands did turn out across the country, but in what proved to be a series of uncoordinated local uprisings.

=== The South ===
"Father Murphy's flag" carried by rebels at the battle of Arklow

Some historians conclude that what connects the United Irishmen to most widespread and sustained of the uprisings in 1798 are "accidents of time and place, rather than any real community of interest". Daniel O'Connell, who abhorred the rebellion, may have been artful in proposing that there had been no United Irishmen in Wexford. But his view that the uprising in Wexford had been "forced forward by the establishment of Orange lodges and the whipping and torturing and things of that kind" was to be widely accepted

The Wexford Rebellion broke not in the securely Catholic south of the county, where there had been greater political organisation, but in the sectarian-divided north and centre which had seen previous agrarian disturbances. The absence of an at least belated United organisation is disputed (from early 1797, William Putnam McCabe and James Hope were among the agents of the new cell structure traversing the area), but it is generally agreed, with the earliest historian of Wexford rising, Edward Hay, that the trigger was the arrival on 26 May 1798 of the notorious North Cork Militia.

The rebels swept south through Wexford Town meeting their first reversal at New Ross on 30 May. There followed the massacre of loyalist prisoners at Scullabogue and, after a Committee of Public Safety was swept aside, at Wexford Bridge. A "striking resemblance" has been proposed to the 1792 September massacre in Paris", and it is noted that there were a small number of Catholics among the loyalists killed, and of Protestants among the rebels present. But for loyalists the sectarian nature of the outrages was unquestioned and was used to great effect in the north to secure defections from the republican cause. Much was made of the report that in their initial victory over the North Cork Militia at Oulart Hill the rebels had been commanded by a renegade Catholic priest, Father John Murphy.

After a bombardment and rout of upwards of 20,000 rebels upon Vinegar Hill on 21 June remnants of the "Republic of Wexford" marched north through the Midlands – the counties thought best organised by the Executive – but few joined them. Those in the region who had turned out on 23 May had already been dispersed. On 20 July, re-joining insurgents in Kildare, the few hundred remaining Wexford men surrendered. All but their leaders benefited from an amnesty intended by the new Lord Lieutenant, Charles Cornwallis to flush out remaining resistance. The law was pushed through the Irish Parliament by the Chancellor, Lord Clare. A staunch defender of the Ascendancy, Clare was determined to separate Catholics from the greater enemy, "Godless Jacobinism."

Contending with marauding bands of rebel survivors (the Babes in the Wood and the Corcoran gang), Wexford did not see martial law lifted until 1806. In continued expectation of the French, and kept informed by Jemmy Hope of Robert Emmet's plans for a renewed uprising, Michael Dwyer sustained a guerrilla resistance in the Wicklow Mountains until the end of 1803.

=== The North ===
Detail of the Battle of Ballynahinch 1798 by Thomas Robinson. Yeomanry prepare to hang United Irish insurgent Hugh McCulloch, a grocer.

The northern executive had not responded to the call on 23 May. The senior Dublin Castle secretary, Edward Cooke, could write: "The quiet of the North is to me unaccountable; but I feel that the Popish tinge of the rebellion, and the treatment of France to Switzerland [the Protestant Cantons were resisting occupation] and America [the Quasi naval war], has really done much, and, in addition to the army, the force of Orange yeomanry is really formidable."In response to the claim that "in Ulster, there are 50,000 men with arms in their hands, ready to receive the French," the Westminster Commons was assured that while "almost all Presbyterians... were attached to the popular, or, what has been called, the republican branch of the constitution, they are not to be confounded with Jacobins or banditti".

When Robert Simms, despairing of French aid, resigned his United Irish command in Antrim on 1 June, McCracken seized the initiative. He proclaimed the First Year of Liberty on 6 June. There were widespread local musters but before they could coordinate, most were burying their arms and returning to their farms and workplaces. The issue had been decided by the following evening. McCracken, commanding a body of four to six thousand, failed, with heavy losses, to seize Antrim Town.

In Down, Dickson, who had stood in for Russell, was arrested with all his "colonels". Under the command of a young Lisburn draper, Henry Monro, there was a rising on 9 June. Following a successful skirmish at Saintfield several thousand marched on Ballynahinch where they were completely routed.

Shortly before the Battle of Ballynahinch on the 12th, The Defenders of County Down are said, in some reports, to have withdrawn. John Magennis, their county Grand Master, was allegedly dismayed by Munro's discounting of a night attack upon the carousing soldiery as "unfair". Defenders had been present at Antrim, but in the march upon the town tensions with the Presbyterian United Irish may have caused some desertions and a delay in McCracken's planned attack.

Confident of being able to exploit tensions between Presbyterians and Catholics, the government not only amnestied the rebel rank-and-file it recruited them for the Yeomanry. On 1 July 1798 in Belfast, the birthplace of the United Irishmen movement, it is said that every man was wearing the Yeomanry's red coat. As he enlisted former United Irishmen into his Portglenone Yeomanry Corps, Anglican clergyman Edward Hudson claimed that "the brotherhood of affection is over". On the eve of following his leader to the gallows, one of McCracken's lieutenants, James Dickey, is reported by Henry Joy (a hostile witness) as saying: "the Presbyterians of the north perceived too late that if they had succeeded in their designs, they would ultimately have had to contend with the Roman Catholics".

A spirit of resistance was nonetheless sustained. The authorities were persuaded in May 1799 that County Down had been "re-regimented and re-officered" and until the spring of 1802, while hopes could still be entertained of a French landing, United veterans continued night-time arms raids and assaults upon loyalists, especially in Antrim. Here, however, they were now organised in Defender cells (from whose oaths references to religion had been notably dropped).

=== The West ===
On 22 August 1798, 1,100 French landed at Killala in County Mayo. After prevailing in a first engagement, the Races of Castlebar, but unable to make timely contact with a new rising in Longford and Meath, General Humbert surrendered his forces on 8 September. The last action of the rebellion was a slaughter of some 2000 poorly-armed insurgents outside Kilala on the 23rd – refugees from the Armagh Disturbances among them – led by a scion of Mayo's surviving Catholic gentry, James Joseph MacDonnell.

On 12 October, a second French expedition was intercepted off the coast of Donegal, and Tone was taken captive. Regretting nothing done "to raise three million of my countrymen to the ranks of citizen," and lamenting only those "atrocities committed on both sides" during his exile, Tone on the eve of execution took his own life.

== The United Irish Directory and renewed conspiracy, 1798–1805 ==
=== Restoring a United network ===
After the collapse of the rebellion, the young militants William Putnam McCabe (the son of founding member Thomas McCabe) and Robert Emmet (the younger brother of Thomas Addis Emmet), together with veterans Malachy Delaney and Thomas Wright, sought to restore a United organisation. With the support and advice of state prisoners Thomas Russell and William Dowdall, they recruited on a strictly military basis. Rather than be open to nomination, under the "New Plan of Organisation" the membership would be selected personally by officers acting on the authority of a national directorate. The strategy was again to solicit a French invasion with the promise of simultaneous risings in Ireland and England. To this end McCabe set out for France in December 1798, stopping first in London.

In England, the united network in had been disrupted in the wake of Coigley's arrest in March. But the influx of refugees from Ireland (from Manchester there were reports of as many as 8,000 former rebels living in the city);. the angry response of workers to the Combination Acts, and growing protest over food shortages encouraged renewed organisation among former conspirators. A military system and pike manufacture began to spread across the mill districts of Lancashire and Yorkshire, and regular meetings resumed between county and London delegates resumed. Initiates were given card-printed oaths committing them to both "The Independence of Great Britain and Ireland" and "The Equalisation of Civil, Political and Religious Rights". All plans, in England and Ireland, however were predicated on a French invasion.

Hopes were dashed by the Treaty of Amiens in March 1802. They revived again when the war resumed in May 1803. But as in 1798, Napoleon had committed elsewhere the naval and military forces that might have made a descent upon Ireland possible. Instead of returning to Ireland, General Humbert had been tasked in 1803 with the re-enslavement of Haiti.

=== Emmet's Rebellion ===
In February 1803 Edward Despard was convicted of conspiring with the united network in London (disaffected soldiers and labourers, many of them Irish) to assassinate the King and seize the Tower of London and to spark insurrection in the mill towns of the north. Undaunted by the defeat of what he acknowledged as "this similar attempt in England," and with no further consideration of French aid, Emmet planned to seize Dublin Castle.

Through a series of mishaps, the callout in Dublin on 23 July 1803 resulted only in a series of street skirmishes, and in September Emmet followed Despard to the gallows. On the promise of arms, Dwyer's guerrilla fighters in Wicklow and men in Kildare had been willing to act, but in the north, Russell and Hope found in United and Defender veterans alike the spirit of rebellion quite broken. Before his arrest, and with all else lost, Emmet asked Myles Byrne to return to Paris to plead afresh for intervention.

In October 1805, any remaining hopes of a return of the French were blasted by the destruction of the French and Spanish fleets at Cape Trafalgar. (It was left to Walter Cox, in 1811, to imagine what might have been: his Proposed Speech of Bonaparte to [the Irish] Parliament). A French Irish Legion (reinforced by 200 former United Irishmen sold by the British government as indentured mine labourers to Prussia, and joined for a time by William Dowdall and Arthur O'Connor) was redeployed to counter-insurgency in Spain. The United network unwound. McCabe, and other exiles, started seeking terms with the British government for a political surrender and return.

== United Irish in new world exile ==
=== American Society of United Irishmen ===
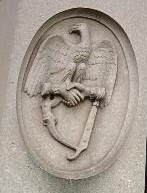
Motif on the memorial obelisk for Thomas Addis Emmet (1764-1827), St. Paul's Chapel, Manhattan.

In October 1799, Castlereagh received a report from Jamaica that many United Irish prisoners, "incautiously drafted" into regiments for service in the West Indies, had taken to the hills to fight alongside the Maroons and "such of the French as were in the island". The alarm spoke to a fear current both in the West Indies and in the United States (then engaged in its own Quasi War with the French) that Irish Jacobins would conspire in the cause not only of France but also of her putative allies, her former slaves in the Haitian Revolution.

In May 1798, the Federalist (and English) pamphleteer William Cobbett began publishing in Philadelphia accounts of a Conspiracy, Formed by the United Irishmen, With the Evident Intention of Aiding the Tyrants of France In Subverting the Government of the United States. Convening in the city's African Free School, and admitting free blacks, Irish émigrés had formed a society committed not only to an Irish republic but also to the proposition (to which each member attested) that "a free form of government, and uncontrouled [sic] opinion on all subjects, [are] the common rights of all the human species". For Cobbett, this was proof sufficient of an intention to organise slave revolts and "thus involve the whole country in rebellion and bloodshed".

Proposed by Tone's confidante in America, a veteran Volunteer, Freemason and United Irishman from Tyrone, James Reynolds, this American Society of United Irishmen appears to have had chapters in several ports-of-entry including, in addition to Philadelphia, Baltimore, New York and Wilmington, although, given the lack of record, it is improbable that their membership ran into the thousands claimed by Cobbett, or that it was of a seriously seditious nature. Local sections reportedly contained no more than eight people meeting weekly to discuss political works and correspondence. Sections sent delegates to state committee, which in turn elected a general executive in Philadelphia. Offices were rotated on a regular basis.

Protesting the Alien and Sedition Acts, in an open letter to George Washington one of their principals, William Duane (former editor in London of the LCS paper The Telegraph), defended a vision of citizenship capable both of encompassing "the Jew, the savage, the Mahometan, the idolator, upon all of whom the sun shines equally", and of conceding "the right of the people to make and alter their constitutions of government". But by 1800–1801, United men were organised as Jeffersonian Democrats in Hibernian societies, and in the War of 1812 realised what may have been the extent of their ambition: the opportunity to "strike a blow against the British Empire" and, in so doing, to secure "their place in American society".

=== "United Irish" mutinies in Newfoundland and New South Wales ===
The British colonies of Newfoundland and New South Wales provided the more credible reports of United Irish subversion. In Newfoundland, two-thirds of the colony's main settlement, St. John's, were Irish, as were most of the island's locally-recruited British garrison. In April 1800, there were reports that upwards of 400 men had taken a United Irish oath, and that eighty were resolved to kill their officers and seize their Protestant governors at Sunday service. The mutiny (for which 8 were hanged) may have been less a United Irish plot, than an act of desperation in the face of brutal living conditions and officer tyranny. Yet the Newfoundland Irish would have been aware of the agitation in the homeland for civil equality and political rights. There were reports of communication with United men in Ireland from before '98 rebellion; of Paine's pamphlets circulating in St John's; and, despite the war with France, of hundreds of young Waterford men still making a seasonal migration to the island fisheries, among them defeated rebels who are said to have "added fuel to the fire" of local grievance.

In March 1804, stirred by news of Emmet's rising, several hundred United Irish convicts in New South Wales tried to seize control of the penal colony and to capture ships for a return to Ireland. Poorly armed, and with their leader Philip Cunningham seized under a flag of truce, the main body of insurgents were routed in an encounter loyalists celebrated as the Second Battle of Vinegar Hill.

== Disputed legacy ==
"God Save the Queen" and a United Irish motto "Erin Go Bragh", Ulster Unionist Convention, 1892

It was not the fulfilment of their hopes, but some United Irishmen sought vindication in the Acts of Union that in 1801 abolished the parliament in Dublin and brought Ireland directly under the Crown in Westminster. Archibald Hamilton Rowan, in Hamburg, hailed "the downfall of one of the most corrupt assembles that ever existed", and predicted that the new United Kingdom of Great Britain and Ireland would see "the wreck" of the old Ascendancy.

Drennan was at first defiant, urging Irishmen to enter into a "Solemn League and Covenant [to] maintain their country". But later, in the hope that Westminster might in time realise the original aim of his conspiracy – "a full, free and frequent representation of the people" – he seemed reconciled. "What", he reasoned, "is a country justly considered, but a free constitution"?

In his last years, in the 1840s, Jemmy Hope chaired meetings of the Repeal Association. Hope had his doubts about the nature of the movement Daniel O'Connell launched in the wake of Catholic Emancipation in 1829 to reverse the Acts of Union and to restore the Kingdom of Ireland under the Constitution of 1782.The Presbyterian districts in the north in which he believed "the republican spirit" had run strongest were never again to support an Irish parliament, and in respect of '98 evinced a form of "collective amnesia". A radical opposition to Anglican landlordism continued, but it was "carefully differentiated from national separatism". The United spirit was also quick to wane among Catholics to whom, as Hope noted, the Dissenters in the north appeared to have been "the first to abandon" the "business" they had begun.

In 1799, in Philadelphia, Thomas Ledlie Birch published his Letter from An Irish Emigrant (1799) which maintained that the United Irish had been "goaded" into insurrection by "rapines, burnings, rapes, murders, and other sheddings of blood". But, in Ireland the first public rehabilitation (preceding Madden's monumental The United Irishmen, their lives and times) came in 1831 with The Life and Death of Lord Edward Fitzgerald (1831), described by the author, Ireland's national bard, Thomas Moore as a "justification of the men of '98 – the ultimi Romanorum of our country". In 1832 Moore declined a voter petition to stand as a Repeal candidate. He protested that he could not pretend, with O'Connell, that the consequence of Repeal would be anything less than a real separation from Great Britain, something possible only if Catholics were again "joined by dissenters".

In breaking with O'Connell, Young Irelanders proposed to forge this renewed unity in the struggle for tenant rights and land ownership. Gavan Duffy recalled from his youth a Quaker neighbour who had been a United Irishman and had laughed at the idea that the issue was kings and governments. What mattered was the land from which the people got their bread. Instead of indulging "Gallic passions" and singing La Marseillaise, what the men of '98 should have borrowed from the French was "their sagacious idea of bundling the landlords out of doors and putting tenants in their shoes".

For O'Connell, who believed Dublin Castle had deliberately fomented the rebellion as a pretext for abolishing the Irish parliament, unionist sentiment in the north was simply the product of continued Protestant privilege. Were this abolished with the repeal of the Union, "the Protestant community would with little delay melt into the overwhelming majority of the Irish nation". For republicans, it remained the "sad irony" of 1798 that by a system of often marginal advantages "the descendants of the republican rebels" were "persuaded" to regard "the 'connection with England' as the guarantee of [their] dignity and rights."

Unionists argued that, focused on breaking "the connection with England", Repealers, Home-Rulers and republicans misrepresented the true object of the United Irishmen. There was, they insisted, no irony and no paradox in descendants of the United Irish entering a Solemn League of Covenant to maintain their country as the United Kingdom. Had their forefathers been offered a Union under the constitution as it later developed there would have been "no rebellion": "Catholic Emancipation, a Reformed Parliament, a responsible Executive and equal laws for the whole Irish people – these", they maintain, were "the real objects of the United Irishmen". Later, in Northern Ireland, Edna Longley noted the tendency of Protestant writers to "use 1798 rather than 1916 as the radical benchmark" – and as one which might suggest "difference rather than solidarity" with the new Irish state in the south.

Noting that "the United Irishmen were, after all, anything but united", a major history of the movement observes that "the legacy of the United Irishmen, however interpreted, has proved as divisive for later generations as the practice of this so-called union did in the 1790s". Writing on the 200th anniversary of the uprising, the historian John A. Murphy, suggests that what can be commemorated – other differences aside – is "the first time entrance of the plain people on the stage of Irish history." The United Irishmen had "promoted egalitarianism and the smashing of deference." After their defeat in the Battle of the Big Cross in June 1798 (the only United uprising in Munster where local Defenderism, the "Rightboys", had been crushed a decade before, and a strong Cork city United organization had been broken in April), the Clonakilty Catholics were harangued in their chapel by Rev. Horace Townsend, chief magistrate and Protestant vicar.

Reflect with remorse and repentance on the wicked and sanguinary designs for which you forged so many abominable pikes... Surely you are not foolish enough to think that society could exist without landlords, without magistrates, without rulers... Be persuaded that it is quite out of the sphere of country farmers and labourers to set up as politicians, reformers, and law makers...

What Townsend and the Ascendancy feared most of all were "the manifestations of an incipient Irish democracy". "In the long run," concludes Murphy, "the emergence of such a democracy, rudimentary and inchoate, was the most significant legacy" of the United Irishmen.

== Noted members ==
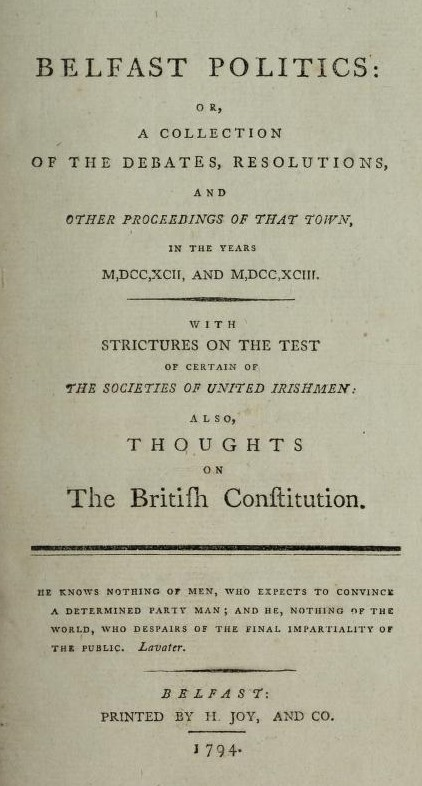
Belfast Politics or A Collection of Debates and Resolutions.. Henry Joy, 1794

.R.R.Madden, Memoirs of the United Irishmen, 1867

- Robert Adrain
- John Allen
- William Aylmer
- Riocard Bairéad
- John Binns
- Thomas Ledlie Birch
- James Bartholomew Blackwell
- Harman Blennerhassett
- Oliver Bond
- Myles Byrne
- William Michael Byrne
- Andrew Bryson
- John Cambers
- William Paulet Carey
- Thomas Cloney
- Father James Coigly
- John Henry Colclough
- William Corbet
- James Corcoran
- Walter Cox
- Alexander Crawford
- George Cummins
- Philip Cunningham
- Malachy Delaney
- James Dempsey
- Edward Despard
- John Devereux
- James Dickey
- William Steel Dickson
- James Dixon
- William Dowdall
- William Drennan
- William Duane
- William Duckett
- Michael Dwyer
- Robert Emmet
- Thomas Addis Emmet
- John Esmonde
- Peter Finnerty
- Lord Edward FitzGerald
- Henry Fulton
- John Glendy
- Watty Graham
- Cornelius Grogan
- William Henry Hamilton
- Bagenal Harvey
- Henry Haslett
- Edward Hay
- Joseph Holt
- James "Jemmy" Hope
- Henry Howley
- Edward Hudson
- Peter Ivers
- Henry Jackson
- William Jackson
- Charles Edward Jennings
- William Todd Jones
- Edward Jordan
- Father Mogue Kearns
- John Kelly
- John Keogh
- Matthew Keogh
- Richard Kirwan
- Valentine Lawless
- William Lawless
- Edward Lewins
- Alexander Lowry
- Thomas McCabe
- William Putnam McCabe
- James McCartney
- Roddy McCorley
- Richard McCormick
- Henry Joy McCracken
- James Joseph MacDonnell
- James MacHugo
- Gilbert McIlveen
- Arthur McMahon
- Leonard McNally (informer)
- William James MacNeven
- Samuel McTier
- Francis Magan
- St John Mason
- Hervey Montmorency Morres
- John Moore
- Thomas Muir, (honorary member)
- Henry Munro
- John Murphy
- Michael Murphy
- Samuel Neilson
- Edward John Newell (informer)
- Arthur O'Connor
- Roger O'Connor
- Padraig Gearr Ó Mannin
- James Orr
- William Orr
- Thomas Paine, honorary member
- Anthony Perry
- James Porter
- James Reynolds
- Philip Roche
- Archibald Hamilton Rowan
- Thomas Russell
- William Sampson
- Timothy Shanley
- The Sheares Brothers
- William Sinclair
- Robert Simms
- Whitley Stokes
- John Sweetman
- John Swiney
- Denis Taaffe
- James Napper Tandy
- Bartholomew Teeling
- Charles Hamilton Teeling
- John Templeton
- John Tennant
- William Tennant
- Theobald Wolfe Tone
- Samuel Turner (informer)
- Staker Wallace
- David Bailie Warden
- Archibald Warwick
- John Campbell White
- Thomas Wright

=== Female members/supporters ===
- Henrietta Battier
- Anne Devlin
- Bridget Dolan
- Lucy Anne FitzGerald
- Pamela FitzGerald
- Elizabeth "Betsy" Gray
- Jane Greg
- Mary Anne Holmes
- Cherry Crawford Hyndman
- Margaret King (Lady Mount Cashell)
- Mary Ann McCracken
- Martha McTier
- Mary Moore
- Matilda Tone

== Bibliography ==
- Bartlett, Thomas, et al. eds. (2003), 1798: A Bicentenary Perspective, Dublin, Four Courts Press
- Courtney, Roger (2013). Dissenting Voices: Rediscovering the Irish Progressive Presbyterian Tradition. Belfast: Ulster Historical Foundation.
- Curtin, Nancy (1999). The United Irishmen: Popular Politics in Ulster and Dublin, 1791–1798. Oxford University Press.
- Daire Keogh and Kevin Whelan eds.(1993) The United Irishmen, Republicanism, Radicalism and Rebellion, Dublin: Lilliput.
- Madden, Richard (1843). The United Irishmen, Their Lives and Times. Belfast: J. Madden & Company.
- McBride, Ian (2009). Eighteenth Century Ireland, Dublin: Gill Books
- McFarland, E. W. (1994), Ireland and Scotland in the Age of Revolution. Edinburgh University Press
- Smyth, Jim (1992). The men of no property: Irish radicals and popular politics in the late eighteenth century. Dublin: Gill & Macmillan.
- Stewart, A. T. Q. (1993). A Deeper Silence: The Hidden Origins of the United Irishmen. London: Faber and Faber.
