= Armagh disturbances =

Period of sectarian fighting in Ireland

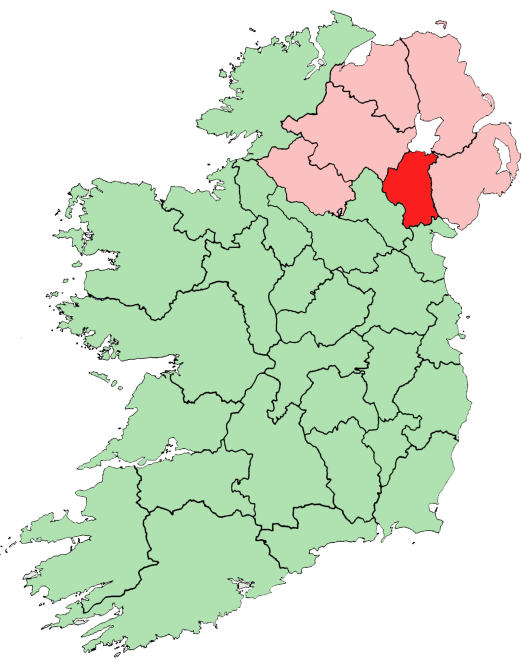
Map of Ireland, with Northern Ireland in light red and County Armagh in red

The Armagh disturbances was a period of intense sectarian fighting in the 1780s and 1790s between the Ulster Protestant Peep o' Day Boys and the Roman Catholic Defenders, in County Armagh, Kingdom of Ireland, culminating in the Battle of the Diamond in 1795.

== Background ==
In County Armagh, Protestants and Catholics were roughly equal in number, in what was then Ireland's most populous county. Whilst there was sporadic rioting by Protestant and Catholic mobs in Armagh Town, the rest of the county was largely at peace. According to James Bryson, writing on 29 December 1783: "I remember something of the state of the public affairs for more than 30 years and I do aver that I never was witness to a more profound tranquility [sic] than what prevails at present." Despite this, both Catholic resentment of Protestants and their privileges and Protestant fears of the Catholics turning on them remained.

Throughout the 1780s these tensions had been rising to boiling point. The relaxing of some of the Penal Laws against Catholics in 1778 and 1782 as well as the failure to enforce others left many Protestants wanting to reinforce their traditional supremacy over Catholics. One of the Penal Laws was the prohibition of Catholics possessing firearms, however some local Volunteer corps admitted Catholics into their ranks, ignoring this.

Another of the relaxed Penal Laws meant that Catholics were granted a parliamentary vote, which brought them into competition with Protestants in the land market. The entry of Catholics to the market caused a rise in prices and many Protestants felt aggrieved when Catholics outbid them on plots of land when their leases expired. Some of these Catholics were also from Connacht. These factors, as well as a lack of land near the linen markets, saw fierce competition to rent land. This occurred at a time when the Protestants already in the linen industry were seeing lower wages because of both increased industrialisation and Catholics taking up weaving.

Dr. William Richardson stated, in what Jonathan Bardon describes as a "detailed analysis" of the situation, in 1797:

"much offence had lately been taken because the Catholics in the general increase in wealth had raised the price of land by bidding high when it became vacant. This was the real cause of our ill-humour:"

Another source of resentment was the revolutions in America and France. These had forced the British government into alleviating its anti-Catholic laws, especially regarding Irish Catholics, for fear of them siding with the French in the event of an invasion, and for fear of them instigating a similar revolution. The government in Dublin, however, was reluctant to be as willing to accommodate Catholics, and so there was a growing sense of unwillingness amongst Catholics to tolerate the treatment they received from Dublin.

== Fleets and Bunker's Hill ==
On 4 July 1784, in Portnorris, six miles south of Markethill, two Presbyterians were involved in a quarrel. The result of this fight was the founding of the Nappach Fleet gang, from the townland of Edenknappagh, by the loser, a bigoted Presbyterian. This in turn led to the creation of the Bawn Fleet, based at Hamilton's Bawn, and the Brass Fleet, more commonly known as the Bunker's Hill Defenders, from Bunker's Hill, also in the townland of Edenknappagh.

The Nappach Fleet, which was the strongest of the gangs, initiated the sectarian trouble. The Bawn Fleet, although largely Protestant, by 1785 was led by a Catholic. The Bunker's Hill Defenders are claimed as possibly being the victims of a feud with the Protestants of Edenknappagh, hence the adoption of "Defenders" in their name. They were mostly Catholic, but were led by a Presbyterian.

On Whit Monday 1785, a pre-planned "great fight" was to take place on Bunker's Hill between the Nappach Fleet and the Bawn Fleet and Bunker's Hill Defenders. The Nappach Fleet are said to have come with 700 members. While they were outnumbered by the other two gangs, they had superior arms. The local MP, Richardson of Richhill, heard of the fight and managed to arrive in time to persuade both sides to disperse peacefully.

After this event, the Presbyterians and Catholics in the fleets started to go their separate ways.The Nappach Fleet started to engage in raiding Catholic homes, and it is at this point they reorganised as the Peep o' Day Boys.

== Peep o' Day Boys ==
The name Peep o' Day Boys (also Break o' Day Boys) came from the early morning raiding of Catholic homes. The reason for these raids initially seems to have been to confiscate weapons, which Catholics were prohibited from having under the Penal Laws. Despite this being illegal, Catholics were able to get arms when several Volunteer companies in County Armagh, the first being the Portnorris company, started to admit Catholics. The figurehead of the Volunteers, Lord Charlemont, opposed the call to admit Catholics, and this may have given a sense of justification to the Peep o' Day Boys disarming of Catholics. However, this is regarded as only a pretext for the raids, with Protestant fears of an end to their domination of Catholics with equal access to weapons. Protestant anger was further riled by a conversion, sermon, and afterwards a pamphlet, by the parish priest of Armagh, Rev. Dr. James Crawley.

The Peep o' Day Boys raids soon not only focused on confiscating arms, but also looting, hooliganism, and acts of revenge. They smashed and destroyed weaving equipment. The raiding and wrecking of homes became commonplace and was known as "wrecking", with the various gangs employing this tactic called "wreckers". On 10 July 1835, during a Parliamentary Select Committee investigation into the Orange Order, James Christie gave evidence where he stated: "It was termed 'wrecking' when the parties broke open the door and smashed everything that was capable of being broken in the house ... they threw the furniture out of the house smashed; and in other cases they set fire to the house and burnt it". Christie stated that the wrecking started in 1784 on the estate of James Verner, a Justice of the Peace.

Further highlighting the economic aspect of the trouble, T. A. Jackson claims that the motives became obvious when the most improved farms on the best land were the first to be attacked. Jackson went on to claim: "Poor and struggling Catholic farmers scratching a living from a stony hill-top farm rarely, if ever, excited Protestant zeal even in the heart of Antrim".

Lord Gosford observed of the Peep o' Day Boys that they were a "low set of fellows who with guns and bayonets, and other weapons break open the houses of the Roman Catholicks, and as I am informed treat many of them with cruelty". Some Protestant gentry gave weapons to Catholics so that they could defend themselves. Soon, however, guns were also being given out to the "Protestant Boys" to defend them from attacks by Catholics. The Defenders' resistance to these attacks further increased Protestant resentment.

== Defenders ==
As the majority of magistrates in County Armagh were anti-Catholic, with the police only successfully countering daytime disturbances, night-time acts went unpunished. This resulted in Catholics having to defend themselves, and to so they formed a night-time neighbourhood watch, keeping an eye out for Peep o' Day Boys gangs. Having seen the fighting between the fleets go unpunished, Catholics became encouraged to form a similar grouping for their own defence. At Granemore, near Ballymacnab, an area that was victim to a Peep o' Days Boys raid, Catholics would form the Defenders. At first they were supplied with arms bought from a Protestant shopkeeper in Armagh, but later began to raid the houses of gentry for arms. They embarked on night-watch and patrols of areas under danger of attack. Soon this organisation spread throughout the county. By 1786 they and the Peep o' Day Boys were opposed to each other.

The Defenders started out as independent local groups, defensive in nature; however, by 1790 they had merged into a widespread secret-oath fraternal organisation consisting of lodges, associated to a head-lodge led by a Grand Master and committee. The Defenders were greatly influenced by Freemasonry, and were made up of working class Catholics. Each member had to swear an oath, which despite the Penal Laws which they were subject to, included the swearing of obedience to King George the Third, his successors, and the government. The oath itself was revised several times, but kept its central character whilst focusing more on loyalty and solidarity.

== Spread of conflict ==
Despite how the two factions started out, they soon started squaring off to each other at fairs, markets, and races etc. where Protestants and Catholics met. Such fights between gangs, like the fleets, was commonplace throughout Ireland and regarded as a "country sport", however it was the intensity of the violence between these two factions that alarmed people. 1786 and in the following years were marked by continued disturbances, with fierce fights breaking out in Tandragee in 1786, and Newtownhamilton in 1787, whilst daytime fighting still erupted at markets and fairs, and the Peep o' Day Boys continuing their night raids. Many people suffered bodily harm, with others murdered or the victim of manslaughter. The amount of damaged property was countless.

The magistrates acquitted any Peep o' Day Boys that appeared in court, as juries consisted of Protestants, whilst convicting and punishing any Defenders. In one instance, in 1786, the captain of the Nappach Fleet was tried and acquitted.

The government eventually sent in the Light Horse cavalry to quell the trouble, however they were only useful in stamping out the daytime fighting in the most accessible places. By 1788 the government, to the chagrin of the county governor, Lord Charlemont, and the magistrates, sent in more troops to sort out the most troublesome areas; Armagh, Keady, Newtownhamilton, and Tandragee; however they were soon removed.

== The Volunteers become involved ==
Charlemont was commander-in-chief of the Volunteers. By 1788 the organisation had faded from its grandeur, with rifts over reforms and Catholic emancipation. The County Armagh Volunteers remained loyal to Charlemont, and it was suggested they be used in place of the military to deal with the trouble and augment the magistrates. Charlemont went about reorganising the County Armagh companies—possibly including the Armagh, Benburb, and Tandragee companies—by forming "new" companies consisting only of Protestants, with an emphasis on Anglican and Presbyterian unity. Charlemont hoped to raise the fallen prestige of the Volunteers and increase his own.

These new Volunteers were tasked with putting down any disorder impartially, however as some Peep o' Day Boys had joined, they made it their intention to confiscate arms held by Catholics. Despite an attempt in July 1788 by Charlemont himself appealing for peace and tranquility, these new Volunteers wouldn't be swayed, with Charlemont's own prejudices having a harmful effect. Catholics and Defenders alike feared these new Volunteers who they saw as legalised Peep o' Day Boys.

Incidents between Volunteers and Defenders soon broke out. In the summer of 1788, some Volunteers returning home from their annual review were attacked by stone-throwing women, who also let their dogs loose. This was followed by disorder at Lisnadill.

The most violent incident involving the Volunteers was at Tullysaran in November 1788. Here the Benburb Company was marching to a religious service in Armagh Cathedral, however as they passed the Catholic chapel at Tullysaran, trouble broke out. Various contemporary accounts are given, with the general picture given that the Benburb Volunteers, who were hated by the Catholics of Tullysaran, marching past its chapel whilst the congregation was present, playing tunes such as "The Protestant Boys" and "Boyne Water", contrary to their official purpose of impartially maintaining peace. As the Volunteers paraded past, some of the Catholic congregation hurled insults and stones at them. After their service the Volunteers procured arms and decided to return the exact same route. The local Catholics, some of which were Defenders, denied the Volunteers passage through Tullysaran and a riot broke out with the Volunteers opening fire on as many Catholics as possible. Despite several Volunteers being arrested and tried, as before they were acquitted. About a fortnight later, Defenders attacked the homes of two prominent Volunteers in Benburb.

The sectarian bigotry and violent conduct of these new Volunteers saw some Protestants, including an Anglican reverend, seeing them as an obstacle to peace. Rather than fulfilling Charlemont's aims of quelling the trouble in County Armagh, the new Volunteers made the situation worse, with day-time fights and night raids still occurring.

By 1789, the Peep o' Day Boys and at times the Volunteers, started to focus on attacking the Catholic religion itself. Portadown's Catholic chapel was razed, and Catholics celebrating the Feast of St. John the Baptist were fired at. Other incidents led to the Defenders retaliating in kind, with both factions seeking to outdo the other in the manner of their outrage.

In response an attempt was made to try some of those responsible, the punishment of those found guilty being either execution or whipping. The majority of those convicted where Catholics, however the result was a lessening in activity by both sides. A few magistrates did try to impartially bring trouble makers to trial, however most did not, with some seeing the sectarian conflict as favourable for the government as it helped keep Protestants and Catholics in County Armagh split, whereas they were coming together elsewhere in favour of reforms.

== Forkhill atrocity ==
In south Armagh where Catholics were a majority, they turned on the Protestants "with a ferocity not seen for more than a century". The point of no return occurred on 28 January 1791, when Catholics cut off the tongues of Mr Barkeley, a popular schoolmaster from Forkhill, and his wife and her 14-year-old brother. They also cut off the calf of the boy and some of the fingers of the other two, with Mrs. Barkeley dying from her injuries. As "the same hereditary enmities handed down from generation to generation" raged to the fore, violence spread to neighbouring counties.

== Increase of hostilities ==
In July 1795 a Reverend Devine had held a sermon at Drumcree Church, Portadown in County Armagh to commemorate the "Battle of the Boyne". In his History of Ireland Vol I (published in 1809), the historian Francis Plowden described the events that followed this sermon:

"Reverend Devine so worked up the minds of his audience, that upon retiring from service, on the different roads leading to their respective homes, they gave full scope to the anti-papistical zeal, with which he had inspired them... falling upon every Catholic they met, beating and bruising them without provocation or distinction, breaking the doors and windows of their houses, and actually murdering two unoffending Catholics in a bog. This unprovoked atrocity of the Protestants revived and redoubled religious rancour. The flame spread and threatened a contest of extermination..."

== Battle of the Diamond ==
In September 1795 the Peep o' Day Boys, including their Orange Boys faction, and Defenders would clash in the short Battle of the Diamond, near Loughgall in County Armagh. The result was between seventeen and forty-eight Defenders being killed. The aftermath of the battle saw the Peep o' Day Boys retire to James Sloan's inn in Loughgall, where they would found the Orange Order. Its first lodge was established in Dyan, County Tyrone, founding place of the Orange Boys.

== United Irishmen ==
Pursuing a "union of power among Irishmen of every religious persuasion", the United Irish societies reached out to the Defenders. They were able to offer practical assistance: legal counsel, aid and refuge. Displaced families were sheltered on Presbyterian farms in Down and Antrim, and the goodwill earned used to open the Defenders to trusted republicans.

Although James Hope and Henry Joy McCracken did much to reach out to the Defenders in Armagh, recognising the sectarian tensions (Robert Simms reported to Wolfe Tone that "it would take a great deal of exertion" to keep the Defenders from "producing feuds"), the Belfast Executive of the United Irishmen chose emissaries from its small number of Catholics. Chief among these were Charles Teeling, son of a wealthy Catholic linen manufacturer in Lisburn and witness to the Battle of the Diamond, and Father James Coigly whose family home in Kilmore, County Armagh, Peep O'Day boys had ransacked.

== See also ==
- Agrarian society
- Defenders (Ireland)
- Hearts of Oak (Ireland)
- Hearts of Steel
- Irish Volunteers (18th century)
- Molly Maguires
- Orange Order
- Peep o' Day Boys
- Ribbonism
- United Irishmen
- Whiteboys
