= John Keogh =

Irish merchant and political activist

- Born: 1740
- Died: 1817 (aged 76–77)
- Political party: Society of United Irishmen
- Movement: Catholic Committee, Catholic Convention

John Keogh (1740 – 13 November 1817) was an Irish merchant and Catholic political activist. He was a leading campaigner for Catholic Emancipation and reform of the Irish Parliament, active in Dublin on the Catholic Committee and, with some reservation, in the Society of United Irishmen. He was a leading organiser of the national Catholic Convention, the so-called "Back Lane Parliament", that gathered in Dublin in December 1792, and which, by direct appeal to the King and his ministers in London, secured passage the Catholic Relief Act of 1793.

== Background ==
Keogh was of an obscure family. He was born in Dublin and made his considerable fortune in land speculation, brewing, and silk trading. He owned land in Dublin, County Sligo, County Roscommon, and County Leitrim, and by the 1790s he had an income of around £6,000 per year.

== Catholic Committee and United Irishmen ==
He became involved in the political struggle for Roman Catholic rights in the 1780s, when he was a member of the Catholic Committee from 1781. In 1784, Keogh joined in a plan for Ulster and Dublin radical elements to combine to push for Catholic franchise, and by 1790 Keogh was leading the Catholic Committee.

In October 1791, reform-minded Presbyterians in Belfast (Protestant "Dissenters" from the established Anglican communion) styled themselves the Society of the United Irishmen, and called for the "equal representation of all the people in parliament"—"a complete and radical reform". They had been addressed by a young Protestant lawyer from Dublin, Theobald Wolfe Tone. Tone was author of An Argument on behalf of the Catholics of Ireland in which he had insisted that the key to constitutional reform was Catholic emancipation. The choice, according to Tone, was stark: either "Reform, the Catholics, justice and liberty" or "an unconditional submission to the present, and every future administration". Three weeks later, at a meeting in Dublin, along with John Sweetman and other leading members of his committee, Keogh approved the resolutions of the new society, summarised by James Napper Tandy as "all Irishmen citizens, all citizens Irishmen".

In the new year, 1792, Keogh appointed Tone as an assistant secretary to Catholic Committee. Tone replaced Richard Burke, the son of Edmund Burke then in a publishing war with Thomas Paine whose defence of the French Revolution, the Rights of Man, the United Irish were distributing in penny editions.

In September 1792, Keogh authored an address, signed "Common Sense", to the Presbyterians of Ulster. Circulated as a handbill in the northern province, it proposed that their shared economic distress was result of taxes exacted in support of the Crown's unjust wars, and of a corrupt Dublin castle administration—an aristocratic junta whose dependents populated all the lucrative offices of Church and state.

== Catholic Convention and the Relief Act ==
In December 1792, Keogh led the Catholic Convention in Dublin. The elections to the convention, "conducted in a blaze of publicity", spread "an expectation of dramatic change to Catholics at every level", and was a spur to the growth among the Catholic peasantry, petty shopkeepers and artisans of militant Defenderism. The Viceroy, Lord Westmorland, called on London for additional troops. The Castle saw the hand of the United Irishmen who accounted for 48 of the Convention's 248 delegates.

The Catholic hierarchy was also alarmed, prompting Keogh to complain of the bishops as "old men used to bend power; mistaking all attempts at liberty as in some way connected with the murders in France". In opening the convention (the "Back Lane Parliament"), to great applause, he had two prelates seated on either side of the chairmen. But the petition, as finally approved and signed by the delegates, was presented to the bishops as a fait accompli, with no implication that their sanction was sought or obtained.

In January 1793, Keogh led a delegation (which included Tone) that carried the petition, which called for full emancipation, to London. The government, eager to secure a measure of Catholic loyalty in advance of the war with the new French Republic, accorded them an audience with the King, and in April helped force a Catholic Relief Act through the Dublin Parliament. The Act relieved Catholics of most of their remaining Penal Law disabilities, lifting the bar to legal appointments and to army commissions, and admitting them on the same limited and idiosyncratic terms as Protestants to the parliamentary franchise. However, the Oath of Supremacy continued to bar them from Parliament itself. In return, Keogh promised that Catholics would not press for further separation from England and that their Committee would disband—concessions for which Keogh was sharply criticised. In 1795, Keogh briefly reconvened the Committee in response to the declaration of the new Lord Lieutenant, Earl Fitzwilliam in favour of admitting Catholics to Parliament. When Fitzwilliam was recalled after just 100 days, Keogh led another delegation to London where it received scant regard.

== Response to rebellion ==
Keogh's authority and influence in the Catholic movement in Ireland decreased as newer leaders emerged. Although he was frequently arrested and searched, Keogh was a moderate radical, and he used his wealth to aid his co-religionists' cause without crossing the line to overt illegality. Along with Thomas Addis Emmet, he was on the non-violent wing of the United Irishmen, Days before the outbreak of the 1798 Rebellion, in despair at the likely result, Keogh printed a pamphlet warning his followers in Dublin that it could not succeed.

Some republicans, such as Walter Cox (who acted as a bodyguard to Lord Edward Fitzgerald) were sceptical of Keogh's motives. Cox suggested that Keogh might have colluded with the government to frustrate the preparations for an insurrection. The acknowledged government informer Samuel Turner (himself a Convention delegate from Newry) suggests, however, that Keogh would have been an unlikely source of information for Dublin Castle. Turner reported that while Keogh was formally counted among 22 members of the "National Committee" of the United Irishmen meeting in Dublin in the summer of 1797, like his fellow Catholic Committee veterans Thomas Broughall and Richard McCormick, Keogh "did not attend".

The Young Irelander, Thomas Davis, reports a conversation in 1802 between Keogh and Thomas Addis Emmet's younger brother Robert. It suggests that in the wake of the 1800 Acts of Union, which, having failed to deliver to the promise of catholic emancipation, transferred a still exclusively Protestant representation of Ireland to Westminster, Keogh was ready to urge a renewed republican conspiracy. Robert Emmet asks Keogh: "if I get ten counties to rise ought I go on?" Keogh is said to have replied: "you ought if you get five, and you will succeed". In July 1803, the only force Robert Emmet was able to raise outside Dublin was in County Kildare, and his insurrection in the capital misfired.

== Death and burial ==
Keogh died in Dublin in 1817 and was buried in St. Kevin's Churchyard, where his grave can be seen.
