= William Duckett (United Irishman) =

Irish activist and academic, United Irishman

William Duckett (1768–1841) was a radical journalist and a United Irishman active in Paris, who was suspected by some in the republican cause of being a British government spy.

Born at Killarney, County Kerry, he was sent to the Irish College at Paris, and gained a scholarship at Sainte-Barbe, then conducted by the Abbé Badnel. He did not receive order and left the college a week after the Storming of the Bastille (14 July 1789) in which fellow Irish student James Bartholomew Blackwell is known to have participated.

In 1794, when William Jackson, envoy of the Committee of Public Safety to the United Irishmen in Dublin, was under arrest, Duckett was the bearer of 14,000 livres to the Irish capital from the Committee for his defence.

In Ireland, Duckett contributed to the Belfast paper of the United movement, the Northern Star, under the pen name "Junius Redivivus". These letters, according to his own account, made it prudent for him to quit Ireland, and in 1796 he was in Paris. Tone, who was also in Paris, regarded him as a spy, and complained that he forestalled him by submitting to the French government several memorandums on the state of Ireland, that he constantly crossed his path in the ministerial antechamber, tried to force his conversation on him, and by addressing him in English betrayed his incognito. When, moreover, Tone arrived with Hoche at Brest, Duckett was there, intending to accompany them, but was not allowed to embark. The historian Richard Hayes attributes Tone's suspicions to "a too impulsive activity on Duckett's part".

In 1798 he was reported to Castlereagh as having been sent to Hamburg with money destined for a mutiny in the British fleet and for burning the dockyards. This, coupled with his outlawry by the Irish parliament, ought to have vouched for his sincerity, but he was suspected of betraying Tandy and Blackwell at Hamburg. The existence of traitors in the camp was so notorious that suspicion often fell on the innocent.

He married a Danish woman associated with the Augustenburg family and returned to Paris around 1803 to become a professor at the collège Sainte-Barbe. Du Rozoir, a former pupil, wrote regarding his classical knowledge and memory, noting his use of comparisons with ancient works during lessons on Shakespeare and Milton.

Duckett seems to have shunned, or been shunned by, Irish exiles in Paris, yet Durozoir testifies to his anti-English feeling and to his admiration of the French Revolution.

In 1819, no longer apparently connected with Sainte-Barbe, he conducted English literature classes, as also girls' classes on the Lancasterian system. Between 1816 and 1821 he published odes on Princess Charlotte's death, Greek and South American independence, etc., productions evidently confined to a small circle in Paris. In 1828 he issued a Nouvelle Grammaire Anglaise.

He died in 1841 in Paris after a long illness, quoting his favourite Horace on his deathbed, and receiving extreme unction. He left two sons, Alexander, a physician, accessit at the Val-de-Grace examination, 1828, and William (1803–1873), a French journalist, translator of German works, and editor or compiler of the Dictionnaire de la Conversation, 52 vols., completed in 1843, to a large extent a translation of Brockhaus. This William had a son, William Alexander (1831–1863), who contributed to the new edition of the Dictionnaire, and published an illustrated work on French monuments, also a daughter, Mathilde (1842–1884?), who studied under Rosa Bonheur, exhibited at the Paris Salon, 1861–8, and taught drawing in Paris.

The Irish historian W. J. Fitzpatrick described Duckett as “an Irishman made skeptical by Voltaire, subtle by the ruses of survival in the Revolution, sharp by the daily duel of French intellects. A marginal from a marginal country that he loved, he was direct and overwhelming in action, but unable to stop.”
