= Samuel McTier =

Samuel McTier (1737/38 – 1795) was the first president of the Belfast Society of the United Irishmen, a revolutionary organisation in late 18th-century Ireland.

== Early life and family ==
Born in Dundonald, County Down, McTier was a chandler by trade and a freemason. In 1773 he married the 31-year-old Martha 'Matty' Drennan, sister of William Drennan one of the founding members of the United Irishmen. By then McTier was a widower with a young daughter. He and Martha would have no children of their own. In 1781 he was declared bankrupt through a combination of bad luck and poor judgement. Four years later he was working as the ballast master to the new Harbour Commission in Belfast, and later as a notary public.

== The United Irishmen ==
The United Irishmen were initially founded in 1791 as a group of liberal Protestant and Presbyterian men interested in promoting Parliamentary reform, and influenced by the ideas of Thomas Paine and his book ‘The Rights of Man’. Original members included Thomas Russell, Wolfe Tone, William Drennan, and Samuel Neilson.

While McTier was not a member of the original 11 men who founded the Society, he was appointed the first President of the Belfast United Irishmen. Thereafter the McTier home, with Martha taking an active interest, became a centre for United Irish gatherings and meetings. Such meetings became dangerous in 1793 after Revolutionary France declared war on Britain. The United Irishmen were outlawed and began to operate as a secretive body.

== Death ==
He died suddenly in June 1795 while holidaying in Inveraray, Scotland with Martha. He left no will, and Martha was forced to live in reduced circumstances for the rest of her long widowhood. She herself died in 1837.
