= Charles Hamilton Teeling =

Irish journalist

Charles Hamilton Teeling (1778–1848) was an Irish political activist, journalist, writer, and publisher from Lisburn, County Antrim, Ulster. He was the second son of Luke Teeling, a successful Catholic linen merchant who, in the cause of complete Catholic Emancipation had been a delegate to the Convention, or "Back Lane Parliament," that had been called by the Catholic Committee in Dublin in December 1792. In 1798, the Teeling mill was to be destroyed by Orangemen.

== Biography ==
At the age of 16, he joined his elder brother Bartholomew Teeling in the Society of United Irishmen, formed in 1791 by Protestant reformers in Belfast. In defiance of the Ascendancy Parliament in Dublin and of the Dublin Castle Executive answerable to London, the Society sought "an equal representation of all the people" of Ireland in a "national government." With his brother-in-law John Magennis, the Teeling brothers helped connect the United Irishmen with the Defenders. A vigilante response to Peep O'Day Boy raids upon Catholic homes in the mid-1780s, by the mid-1790s the Defenders, like the United Irishmen, developed into an extensive oath-bound fraternity. He was a witness, he later claimed, not a partisan in their confrontation with the Peep O'Day Boys in the Battle of the Diamond, 1795.

His activities with the United Irishmen and Defenders led to his arrest on 16 September 1796 for high treason. He was released on bail the following year, remaining free during and after the 1798 rebellion, in which he was to deny any involvement. He was arrested and briefly held again in the wake of Robert Emmet's abortive uprising in 1803, probably due to the involvement of his younger brother George.

Teeling edited a short-lived monthly, the Ulster Magazine (Belfast, 1830–31), and then started or took over a weekly newspaper, the Northern Herald (Belfast), edited partly by Thomas O'Hagan (qv), the future Baron O'Hagan, which survived somewhat longer (1833–36). His memoirs of the politics of his youth appeared in three parts: Personal Narrative of the "Irish Rebellion" of 1798 (1828), his Sequel to Personal Narrative of the "Irish Rebellion" of 1798 (1832), and his History and Consequences of the Battle of the Diamond (1835).

In 1835, through the Northern Herald, Teeling helped launch the journalistic career of Charles Gavan Duffy, future Young Irelander and editor of The Nation.

Charles Hamilton Teeling was said to be ‘late of Belfast’ when he died on 14 August 1848.

Coat of arms of Charles Hamilton Teeling
Notes Posthumously confirmed 14 February 1912 by Nevile Rodwell Wilkinson, Ulster King of Arms. Crest A fleur de lus per pale dancettée Or and Gules. Torse Of the colours. Escutcheon Or two pallets dancettée Gules. Motto Sola Virtus Invicta
