= Sheares brothers =

Irish republican brothers executed in 1798

Sheares Brothers
- John Sheares, Henry Sheares
- Born: 1766, 1753; Cork
- Died: 1798
- Education: Trinity College, Dublin
- Occupation: Lawyers
- Movement: Society of United Irishmen
- Criminal charges: Treason
- Criminal penalty: Execution

The Sheares Brothers, Henry (1753–1798), and John (1766–1798) were prominent members in Ireland of the republican Society of United Irishmen. Active in Cork and in Dublin, they opposed a Protestant faction in the leadership who, fearing that the British Crown could buy loyalty through offers of emancipation, mistrusted Catholic intentions. In 1798, following high-level arrests, they approved In the May 23rd date for a general uprising, but were themselves arrested in advance of the rebellion and were subsequently executed.

== Early lives ==
The Sheares brothers were the sons of Henry Sheares, a liberal banker from County Cork who, as a communicant of the established Church of Ireland was permitted to sit in the Irish Parliament for the Borough of Clonakilty. Henry attended Trinity College Dublin, bought an officer's commission and then studied as a lawyer, being called to the bar as a barrister in Michaelmas term, 1790. John had qualified as a barrister in Michaelmas term, 1789. Their father had died in 1776, leaving a large income of £1,200 p.a.

== Politicisation in Paris ==
In 1792 the brothers went to Paris and were swept away by the popular enthusiasm of the French Revolution. They met leaders such as Brissot and Roland, both of whom were to be executed in 1793. In particular, they witnessed the introduction of the guillotine, on which 1,400 were to die in 1792. On the boat from France to England they met a young Daniel O'Connell to whom they displayed a handkerchief soaked, they claimed, in the blood of Louis XVI, the late executed king. The episode is said to have reinforced O'Connell with a lifelong aversion to mob rule and violence.

== United Irish ==
On their return to Dublin in January 1793, the brothers, committing themselves to Catholic Emancipation and democratic reform, joined the Society of United Irishmen. The Society supported the Catholic Committee who, following an audience in England with King George III, induced the government in April 1793 to introduce the Roman Catholic Relief Act 1793. This relieved the Catholic majority of most of their remaining Penal Law civil disabilities. It also admitted them to the franchise on the same idiosyncratic and highly restrictive basis as Protestants, but not yet to the Ascendancy-dominated Parliament.

In May 1793, Henry Sheares was elected president of the United Society in Dublin. He was opposed by a faction led by William Drennan who feared that, rather than commit to a democratic union with Presbyterians and other disaffected Protestants, Catholic leaders would continue to court the government in the hope of further concessions. Sheares objected to Drennan's efforts to address the existence of a distinct Catholic interest "on grounds of inexpediency". Consistent with the Society's proposed union of Catholic, Protestant and Dissenter, he believed that in the struggle for popular representation and independence, Catholics should be regarded as having "melted into the general population".

From the beginning of 1794, the Crown was at war with the new French Republic, and in a succession of steps presaging martial law in Ireland, the prospects for reform rapidly receded. While two other less famous brothers enlisted in the British army (and were later killed), and while continuing with their own legal careers, Henry and John Sheares enthusiastically engaged in the work of the United Irish societies as they transformed themselves from political clubs into an insurrectionary movement. The brothers principally organised the movement in Cork, where one of their keenest members in Cork, a Mr. Conway, informed the administration of their activities. But they also counted among the leadership in Dublin where another spy, Thomas Collins, passed on their names.

As government successes, including the arrest in Dublin of the Leinster provincial committee in March 1798, increased pressure on the leaders at large to initiate action in advance of the hoped-for French assistance, the Sheares brothers found themselves isolated. Rather than on their own disorganised resources, they argued that United Irishmen should seek to subvert the government's conscript militia and support a military coup. They were overruled by, among others, Samuel Neilson, who retained confidence in the mass organisation. Following the May arrests of Neilson and Edward Fitzgerald, the principal military organisers in Dublin, John Sheares briefly returned to leadership. His main act at this point was to decide on the date for the rising, May 23.

== Arrest and Execution ==
Already quietly betrayed by Conway and Collins, John also befriended Captain Warnesford Armstrong from County Down, who claimed to be a busy member of the party there. John never checked this, and Armstrong informed the authorities of the brothers' whereabouts, also appearing as a witness in the ensuing trial. On Monday, 21 May, they were both arrested — Henry, at his house at 128 Baggot Street Lower, and John, at the house of his friend, Surgeon Lawless, in French Street. They were indicted on 26 June.

The brothers were tried on 12 July, as the rebellion was at its height, and were hanged, drawn and quartered on the 14th. The presiding judge was Hugh Carleton, 1st Viscount Carleton, the Chief Justice of the Irish Common Pleas, who was much criticised for taking the case, as the boys' father, a close friend, had appointed Carleton their guardian. Their lawyer was John Philpot Curran who, with Sir Jonah Barrington, obtained a stay of execution in the hope that Henry would recant, but the brothers were already dead. They were buried at St Michan's nearby. Visitors are brought to their coffins on a tour of St. Michan's vaults.

John's speech from the dock was later much quoted, including his justification:

"The accusation of which I speak, while I linger here yet a minute, is that of holding out to the people of Ireland a direction to give no quarter to the troops fighting for its defence. My lords, let me say thus, that if there be any acquaintances in this crowded court--I do not say my intimate friends, but acquaintances--who do not know what I say is truth, I shall be reputed the wretch which I am not; I say, if any acquaintance of mine can believe that I could utter a recommendation of giving no quarter to a yielding and unoffending foe, it is not the death which I am about to suffer that I deserve--no punishment could be adequate to such a crime. My lords, I can not only acquit my soul of such an intention, but I declare, in the presence of that God before whom I must shortly appear, that the favorite doctrine of my heart was that no human being should suffer death, but when absolute necessity required it."

== Family ==
All four Sheares brothers died in the 1790s. Henry left six children. His widow survived in Kingstown (Dún Laoghaire) until 1850. John, who never married, had a daughter who was cared for by friends in Cork.

== Fiction ==
Christine Pakenham (née Trew), Countess of Longford, sets her 1942 play 'The United Brothers' in the drawing room of Lady Steele (Maria Verity widow of Sir Parker Steele Bt of Hampstead, Co Dublin) at 11 Merrion Square, Dublin. She had prevented John Sheares from marrying her daughter Maria Steele who later tried to save the brothers.
