= James Dickey (United Irishmen) =

- Born: 1775/1776; Crumlin, County Antrim; Kingdom of Ireland.
- Died: 26 June 1798; Corn Market, Belfast
- Occupation: Barrister
- Political party: United Irishmen

James Dickey (1775/1776 – 26 June 1798) was a young barrister from a Presbyterian family in Crumlin in the north of Ireland who was active in the Society of the United Irishmen and was hanged with Henry Joy McCracken for leading rebels at the Battle of Antrim.

== The United Irishmen ==
The Society of United Irishmen was formed in October 1791 by leading citizens in Belfast who sought a representative government in Ireland based on principles they believed had been modelled by the American and French Revolutions. At their first meeting, they embraced the argument of Theobald Wolfe Tone for a “brotherhood of affection” between Irishmen of all religious persuasions. Tone argued that in Ireland the landed Anglican Ascendancy and the English-appointed Irish executive employed division between Protestants and Catholics to balance “the one party by the other, plunder and laugh at the defeat of both.”

== Rebellion ==
Despairing of reform, and in the hope of French assistance, in May 1798, the United Irishmen took up arms against the Dublin government and the British Crown. Beginning in Kildare, the insurrection spread to other counties in Leinster before finally reaching the Presbyterian districts surrounding Belfast. On 5 June the Antrim societies of United Irishmen met in Templepatrick where they elected textile manufacturer Henry Joy McCracken as their General. The next day McCracken issued a proclamation calling for the United Army of Ulster to rise. The initial plan met with success, as the towns of Larne, Ballymena, Maghera and Randalstown were taken and the bridge at Toome damaged to prevent the government rushing reinforcements into Antrim from west of the Bann.

According to the memoirs of James Burns from Templepatrick, Dickey had commanded the insurgents at Randalstown, and had killed Samuel Parker, a "traitor, with his own hands, while standing at his own door, where he went for the purpose".

McCracken led a body of about 6000 rebels in an attack on Antrim town. As promised Catholic Defenders turned out, but in the march upon the town tensions with the Presbyterian United Irish may have caused some desertions and a delay in McCracken's planned assault. McCracken's men were defeated and his army melted away. On June 15, Dickey, together with McCracken, James Hope, James Orr and about 50 other rebel survivors from Antrim arrived at Slemish, near Ballymena. There they set up camp for 3 weeks before leaving under threat of attack from Colonel Green of the Tay Fencibles.

== Capture and death ==
Dickey was captured by the Sutherland fencibles on the Divis Mountain where he hid out. He was court-martialled and hanged at Corn Market, Belfast on 26 June 1798. Famously; before his hanging Dickey refused to wear a black hood saying to the hangman, "Sir, don't cover my face!" According to local legend, he shouted, "Don't think gentlemen, I am ashamed to show my face among you, I am dying for my country!" However, Henry Joy of the loyalist News Letter has Dickey on the scaffold recanting his commitment to the "brotherhood of affection" between Catholic and Protestant. He is supposed to have warned the assembled that had "the Presbyterians of the north succeeded in their [republican] designs, they would ultimately have had to contend with the Roman Catholics". It is testament to the sentiment that in the north was to largely expunge the memory of his, and McCracken's, sacrifice.

Dickey was 22 years old. His head was placed on a spike outside the Market House on Belfast's High Street.

== Brother, John Dickey ==
James Dickey's brother, John Dickey of Crumlin was also implicated in the rebellion. He was informed on by neighbours who had noticed that he was making pikes and attending secret meetings of the United Irishmen late at night. Arrested and court-martialled, he refused the terms granted by the government to the "State Prisoners" in Dublin. He was transported to the West Indies for penal servitude, but managed to escape and made his way to the United States.
