= Battle of the Diamond =

1795 Ireland confrontation

- Part of the Armagh disturbances
Date	21 September 1795
Location	The Diamond, County Armagh 54.411°N 6.600°W
Result	Protestant victory

Belligerents
Protestant Peep o' Day Boys and allies	Catholic Defenders and allies

Strength
Below 300	Around 300

Casualties and losses
Some wounded	Around 6 dead, with a large amount wounded
- Location of The Diamond, in between Loughgall and Portadown, County Armagh

The Battle of the Diamond was a planned confrontation between the Catholic Defenders and the Protestant Peep o' Day Boys that took place on 21 September 1795 near Loughgall, County Armagh, Ireland. The Peep o' Day Boys were the victors, killing some 6 Defenders, with some wounded Peep o' Day boys in return. It led to the foundation of the Orange Order and the onset of "the Armagh outrages".

== Background ==
In the 1780s, County Armagh was the most populous county in Ireland and the centre of its linen industry. Its population was equally split between Protestants, who were dominant north of the county, and Catholics, who were dominant in the south. Sectarian tensions had been increasing throughout the decade and were exacerbated by the relaxing of some of the Penal Laws, failure to enforce others, and the entry of Catholics into the linen industry at a time when land was scarce and wages were decreasing due to pressure from the mechanised cotton industry. This led to fierce competition to rent patches of land near markets.

By 1784, sectarian fighting had broken out between gangs of Protestants and Catholics. The Protestants re-organised themselves as the Peep o' Day Boys, with the Catholics forming the Defenders. The next decade would see an escalation in the violence between the two and the local population as homes were raided and wrecked.

== Planned confrontation ==
The Diamond, which was a predominantly Protestant area, is a minor crossroads in County Armagh, lying almost half-way between Loughgall and Portadown. For several days groups from both sides had been arriving at the crossroads. The Defenders had made their base on Faughart Hill in the townland of Tullymore, less than a quarter of a mile south-west of The Diamond. The Peep o' Day Boys, which historian Connolly states were of the "Orange Boys" faction, encamped on a hill in the townland of Grange More to the north-east.

Word of a planned confrontation appears to have been widespread well before it took place, even being gossiped about by militia-men stationed at Dublin and Westport. Catholic Bernard Coile, from Lurgan, County Armagh, who had risen to become a merchant in the linen industry, called upon the local two parishes to agree to a non-aggression pact. This appears to have succeeded in regards to the Lurgan area, as there is no record of any Lurgan men as having been amongst the combatants. There would also seem to have been adequate time for preparations, with one County Tyrone militia-man sending home a guinea to purchase a musket for the Defenders, and Peep o' Day Boys scouring Moy, County Tyrone for gunpowder.

The fact that word seems to have been so widespread means that the government could not have been unaware that trouble was stirring.

The Peep o' Day Boys are cited in three accounts of the battle as possessing Volunteer muskets, with additional weapons provided by local squires. One account, by Charles Teeling, who had given up hopes of being a mediator, stated that on his return to Lisburn, County Down, he saw re-formed Volunteer corps with all of their equipment heading for The Diamond. The Defenders on the other hand may not all have been armed and possessing lesser quality firearms.

== The days before the battle ==
The numbers had increased so much that by Friday 18 September 1795, a local magistrate, Captain Joseph Atkinson, who lived about a mile north of The Diamond, called for a peace conference between four Protestant landowners and three Catholic priests. A priest accompanying the Defenders persuaded them to seek a truce after a group called the "Bleary Boys" came from County Down to reinforce the Peep o' Day Boys.

At some point large numbers of Defender reinforcements from counties Londonderry and Tyrone are claimed to have been prevented from crossing the River Blackwater by James Verner and his sons who led a detachment of the North-Mayo militia, based in Dungannon, northwards to seize the boats by the river. The Defenders failed to await substantial reinforcements from Ballygawley, County Tyrone and Keady, County Armagh, and were starting to become panicked by the situation, being on enemy soil and winter not far away.

The landowners summoned by Atkinson were: Robert Camden Cope, of the grand Loughgall Manor, MP for County Armagh and Lieutenant Colonel of the Armagh Militia; Nicholas Richard Cope and his son Arthur Walter Cope, proprietors of the much smaller Drumilly estate; and James Hardy, the squire of Drumart. The priests were fathers: Taggart, possibly Arthur Taggart, parish priest of Cookstown, County Tyrone, who was notoriously erratic; McParland, future parish priest of Loughgall from 1799, possibly Arthur McParland; and Trainor. William Blacker claims a leader of the Defenders, "Switcher Donnelly", was also present. According to Patrick Tohall, there is reason to doubt the sincerity of all the delegates at this peace conference. He claims some may have used it to blindside the genuine peace-makers, with the two armed sides seeing the clash as inevitable.

On Saturday 19 September, the priests who had stayed the night in Atkinson's house, left apparently satisfied at the outcome. There are conflicting accounts of what happened next. According to Tohall, writing in 1953, the local Catholics had obeyed the priests, and this is evidenced by none of them being counted amongst the eventual combatants. He goes on to state that the priests seemingly failed to go to Faughart Hill and persuade the Defenders. Blacker, who was there on the day of the battle on the Protestant side, however said when he was being questioned by a government Select Committee meeting on the Orange Order on 4 August 1835, that the Defenders had agreed to disperse and that the Peep o' Day Boys would do likewise. Later that day there was sporadic shooting, which didn't trouble Atkinson, and this was followed on Sunday 20 September by overall quietness.

Some Defender reinforcements from County Tyrone however made it to The Diamond and appear to have encouraged their comrades to become "determined to fight", and a decision seems to have been taken that night to advance the next day. Blacker claims "a large body of 'Defenders' not belonging to the County of Armagh, but assembled from Monaghan, Louth and I believe Cavan and Tyrone came down and were disappointed at finding a truce of this kind made, were determined not to go home without something to repay them for the trouble of their march".

== The battle ==
On the morning of 21 September, the Defenders, numbering around 300, made their way downhill from their base, occupying Dan Winter's homestead, which lay to the north-west of The Diamond and directly in their line of advance. News of this advance reached the departing Peep o' Day Boys who quickly reformed at the brow of the hill where they had made their camp. From this position, they gained three crucial advantages: the ability to comfortably rest their muskets, allowing for more accurate shooting; and a steep up-hill location which made it hard for attackers to scale; and a direct line-of-sight to Winter's cottage which the Defenders made their rallying point. This has been claimed as showing that the Peep o' Day Boys had more experienced commanders.

The shooting began again in earnest, and after Atkinson gave his weapon and powder to the Peep o' Day Boys, he rode to Charlemont Garrison for troops to quell the trouble. There was no effective unit stationed in the garrison at the time, despite the fact a detachment of the North-Mayo Militia was stationed in Dungannon and a detachment of the Queen's County Militia was at Portadown.

The battle according to Blacker, was short and the Defenders suffered "not less than thirty" deaths. James Verner, whose account of the battle is based on hearsay, gives the total as being nearly thirty, whilst other reports give the figure as being forty-eight, however this may be taking into account those who died afterwards from their wounds. A large number of Defenders are also claimed to have been wounded. One of those claimed to have been killed was "McGarry of Whiterock", the leader of the Defenders. The Peep o' Day Boys on the other hand in the safety of the well-defended hilltop position suffered no casualties. Blacker praised the Bleary Boys for their prowess in the fight.

== Aftermath ==
In the aftermath of the battle, the Peep o' Day Boys retired to James Sloan's inn in Loughgall, and it was here that James Wilson, Dan Winter, and James Sloan would found the Orange Order, a defensive association pledged to defend "the King and his heirs so long as he or they support the Protestant Ascendancy". The first Orange lodge of this new organisation was established in Dyan, County Tyrone, founding place of the Orange Boys.

One historian claims that the victors saw the battle as "a Godly conquest, construed as a sanction for the spoliation of the homes of the Philistines". This saw violence directed firstly at the Catholics in the vicinity of The Diamond who had refrained the participating in the battle, before spreading throughout the county and further afield.

The winter of 1795–6, immediately following the battle, saw Protestants drive around 7,000 Catholics out of County Armagh in what became known as "the Armagh outrages". In a sign that tension over the linen trade was still a burning issue, 'Wreckers' continued the Peep o' Day Boys strategy of smashing looms and tearing webs in Catholic homes to eliminate competition. This resulted in a reduction in the hotly competitive linen trade which had been in a brief slump. A consequence of this scattering of highly-political Catholics however was a spread of Defenderism throughout Ireland.

== Diamond Day ==
"Diamond Day" marks the anniversary of the Battle of the Diamond, and marks the beginning of Orange Heritage Week. An annual celebratory cultural week held across Northern Ireland from 21 to 28 September.
