= John Orr (priest) =

Irish Anglican priest

John Orr was an 18th-century Irish Anglican priest.

Barton was educated at Trinity College, Dublin, He was Rector of Maryborough then Archdeacon of Ferns from 1757 until 1767.
