= Catholic Committee (Ireland) =

18th c. Catholics' rights organization

The Catholic Committee was a county association in late 18th-century Ireland that campaigned to relieve Catholics of their civil and political disabilities under the kingdom's Protestant Ascendancy. After their organisation of a national Catholic Convention helped secure repeal of most of the remaining Penal Laws in 1793, the Committee dissolved. Members briefly reconvened the following year when a new British Viceroy, William Fitzwilliam, raised hopes of further reform, including lifting the sacramental bar to Catholics entering the Irish Parliament. When these were dashed by his early recall to London, many who had been mobilized by the Committee and by the Convention, defied their bishops, and joined the United Irishmen as they organised for a republican insurrection.

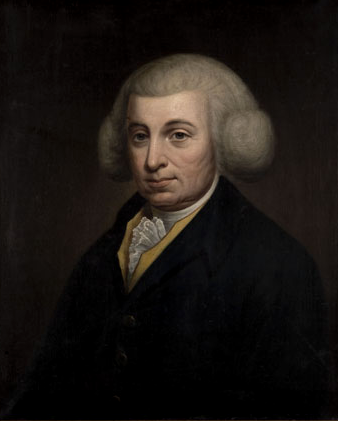
Charles O'Conor of Belanagare

== Early years ==
By the mid 18th century, agitation in the Catholic cause had begun to shift from the gentry to the rising merchant and professional classes. In 1757 the Catholic Committee was formed by Charles O'Conor; others involved included the historian and doctor John Curry and Thomas Wyse of Waterford. Prebendary of Cullen, John Carpenter, future archbishop of Dublin, also joined the Committee.

In 1760, at a meeting at the Elephant Tavern on Essex Street, Dublin, Wyse submitted a plan for a more permanent Catholic Committee, made up of clergy, nobility, and representatives of the people. Before long, every county in Ireland had a committee usually headed by Catholic merchants and landed gentry. O'Conor's support for the first Catholic Committees from 1758 was copied nationwide, contributing to the successful, but slow, repeal of most of the Irish penal laws in 1774-1793.

London's hostility toward Catholics, never as intense as that of the Irish Ascendancy, moderated when, after the death of the Old Pretender in 1766, the Papacy recognized the Hanoverian succession. The British government, in turn, gratified Catholic opinion with the passage in 1774 of the Quebec Act. This not only guaranteed free practice of the Catholic faith in the formerly French North-American province but, in a precedent seized upon by Irish Catholics, removed all reference to the reformed faith from the oath of allegiance required in taking public office.

From the beginning there was disagreement between the gentry and the merchants how best to achieve comparable relief from the penal laws in Ireland. The gentry, who had suffered much in fines and lands lost for adhering to their religion, were apprehensive that an overbold approach would only give rise to greater persecution. The committee did have an early success, organising a campaign of non-payment and of court challenges to the system of "quarterage", by which exclusively Protestant corporations levied surcharges upon Catholic merchants, traders and artisans. Efforts to reinstate the charges legislatively were quashed by Lord Lieutenant Townsend.

== Under Kenmare ==
Despite this success, the Committee movement was paralysed by factional disputes and all but dissolved. In 1773, Thomas Browne, 4th Viscount Kenmare convened a meeting of prominent Catholics in Dublin. While pleading for Penal Law relief, they foreswore any intention of overturning the Williamite Settlement. Together with Arthur James Plunkett, seventh earl of Fingall, Anthony Preston, eleventh Viscount Gormanston, and a number of senior bishops, Kenmare believed that redress was best achieved by maintaining the confidence of the Dublin Castle and London administrations. Kenmare demonstrated his loyalty by helping to recruit the soldiers in Ireland to fight for the Crown in the American Colonies in the 1770s and by supporting the authorities as they suppressed Whiteboy agrarian protest in the 1780s.

Assisted by parliamentarians like Edmund Burke, who in 1765 had published Tracts on the Popery Laws, Kenmare's pro-government policy appeared to pay dividends with the Catholic Relief Act 1778 passed first in the parliament of Great Britain and then, with greater opposition, in the Irish Parliament. The "Papists Act" did not grant freedom of worship, but did allow Catholics on taking a modified oath that abjured the temporal, but not the spiritual, authority of the Pope, to purchase land, and join the army. A further measure followed in 1782: the Irish Parliament, acknowledging the actual tolerated practice of the Catholic faith, repealed the laws that compelled Catholic bishops to quit the kingdom, and binding those who had assisted at Mass to identify the celebrant. In addition, Catholics might now own a horse worth more than £5, and, with the consent of their local Protestant bishop, open their own schools.

It is possible that, in the face of Volunteer and Patriot demands for free trade and Irish legislative independence, that government had begun to see the Catholic community as a potential ally, or that, at any rate, that playing the "Catholic card" might "call Protestant to their senses". Whatever the case, the concessions of 1782 were not supplemented by others for ten years.

== Back Lane Parliament and the Catholic Relief Act 1793 ==
John Keogh, "Member of the Catholic Convention", 1792

In 1790, Dublin merchant John Keogh, active on the national or general committee in Dublin since 1781, became its chairman. In February 1791 elections to the committee from the counties and from the five Dublin parishes brought a dramatic change in its composition, with aspiring middle-class representatives now in the majority and clearly outnumbering the rural gentry delegates. Stirred by news of revolution and reform in France and dissatisfied with the moderation of committee, in October some forty members, including many in the new intake, formed a separate Catholic Society with Theobald McKenna as their secretary. They published the Declaration of the Catholic Society of Dublin to promote unanimity among Irishmen and remove religious prejudices, written by McKenna, demanding total repeal of the penal laws as a matter of right. The declaration caused a split in the Catholic Committee. After presenting to the viceroy a petition for relief which the majority considered "insidious and servile", in December 1791 69 members led by Lord Kenmare publicly seceded.

Acknowledging the departure of the more conservative, gentry, faction, at the beginning of 1792 Keogh dismissed Edmund Burke's son, Richard Burke, as assistant secretary and with McKenna's support replaced him Theobald Wolfe Tone, another Protestant but a known democrat. In Dublin, Tone was a leading member of the Society of United Irishmen first formed in October 1791 by his Presbyterian ("Dissenter") friends in Belfast, in the midst of the town's enthusiasm for the French Declaration of the Rights of Man and its defence by Thomas Paine.

In the 1792 Irish parliamentary session further petitions in favour of a Catholic relief bill, introduced at London's behest to secure Catholic loyalty in the confrontation with the new French Republic, were met with unprecedented contempt. In response the Committee successfully organised a country-wide election to a national convention. In contrast to the deference the Committee had previously shown to Catholic noblemen and gentry, by standards of the time the franchise was broadly democratic. All the kingdom's 32 counties and fifty nine towns and cities were to return delegates. Meetings in each parish, open to all male communicants, elected one or two delegates who, convening in county meetings, would in turn choose up to four of their number for the convention in Dublin. The committee's instructions underscored the democratic spirit of the exercise: "men appointed by others must hold themselves accountable to those from whom they derive their trust and must therefore regulate their conduct by the standard of general opinion".

At the same time, responding to the standard Ascendancy objections to their inclusion within the constitution, the committee issued a Declaration of the civil and religious principles of Catholics. Excluding recognition of the infallibility of the Pope and of his civil authority, it insisted that in Ireland these would not "disturb" or "weaken" the establishment in Ireland of the Protestant religion or the security of the Protestant crown.

The elections to the convention, "conducted in a blaze of publicity", spread "an expectation of dramatic change to Catholics at every level", and was a spur to the growth among the Catholic peasantry, petty shopkeepers and artisans of militant Defenderism The Viceroy, Lord Westmorland, called on London for additional troops. The Castle saw the hand of the United Irishmen, represented not only by Tone, but also by Keogh and Secretary Richard McCormick, who had followed Tone into the United ranks in Dublin. Of the 248 delegates elected to the Catholic Convention, 48 were members of the Dublin Society of the United Irishmen.

Moved by parallels with the election to the National Constituent Assembly in France, the democratic exercise also caused alarm among the Catholic bishops. Keogh complained of "old men used to bend power; mistaking all attempts at liberty as in some way connected with the murders in France". At the opening the Convention, assembled in the Tailor's Hall in Back Lane, Dublin, in December 1792, Keogh was careful to place two prelates seated on either side of the chairmen. But the petition, as finally approved and signed by the delegates, was presented to the bishops as a fait accompli, with no implication that their sanction was sought or obtained.

Within the Convention, the United men operated as a pressure group. On a motion of the Lisburn linen merchant Luke Teeling (advised by Samuel Neilson of the Belfast United Irish Society) the Convention demanded the total emancipation of Catholics, the lifting of all their remaining disabilities both civil and political. It was further resolved to appeal over the heads of the Dublin Parliament and Castle administration directly to the King, George III.

The delegates chosen to carry the petition to London made a point of travelling through Belfast, where Presbyterian supporters insisted on removing the horses from their carriages and pulling them by hand over the Long Bridge into the town. In January 1793, the delegates were well received in London, with Tone reporting "every reason to be content" with their royal audience.

In April, Dublin Castle put its weight behind Henry Grattan in the passage of a Catholic Relief Act. This lifted most of the remaining Penal disabilities: Catholics could be admitted to guilds and corporations, take degrees on Trinity College, be called as barristers and serve as army officers and, most controversially of all, could carry arms. They were also admitted to the franchise on the same limited terms as Protestants. This is to say that, outside of the towns, which were for the most part proprietary or pocket boroughs, Catholics in the counties might obtain the vote "if their landlords (secure in the knowledge that parliament remained a Protestant monopoly, and assuming that deference would bind tenants to the landlord's interest) were prepared to grant freehold tenure".

== Dissolution and the United Irishmen ==
In the wake of the Catholic Relief Act 1793 the committee voted Tone a sum of £1,500 with a gold medal, subscribed to a statue of the King, and (as agreed in London) voted to dissolve.

As a final gesture, the Catholic Committee had issued a declaration calling for parliamentary reform. While this displeased the government, it was seen as poor recompense for those radical Dissenters in the North who believed they had hazarded much to advance the Catholic cause. William Drennan, an original mover of the United Irishmen, complained that the Catholic Committee had "two strings to their bow. One to deal with government, the other to treat with the Society: and its strategy was to go with the one that would promise and deliver the most.

Catholic opinion had not been placated. The concessions under the Relief Act were "permissive rather than obligatory and a newly awakened Protestant Ascendancy chose as often as not to withhold them". Moreover the retention of the Oath of Supremacy which continue to bar Catholics from parliament, from the judicial bench and from the higher offices of state, when all else was conceded, seemed petty, and was "interpreted by the newly politicised Catholic populace as final proof that the existing government was their natural enemy".

Late in 1794 the Committee briefly reconvened. Hope of seeing Catholic Emancipation complete had revived under a new Lord Lieutenant. But having declared in favour of admitting Catholics to Parliament, in February 1795 Earl William Fitzwilliam was recalled after just 6 months in post. Some Committee members were content to lobby for Catholic education: in June 1795 they helped secure government funding for the new Catholic seminary, Maynooth College. Others leaned toward the United Irishmen who, despairing of reform, now moved to draw the agrarian Catholic Defenders with them toward a French-assisted republican insurrection. Committee men served as "the bridge over which United Irishmen and Defenders [were to] join forces".

Keogh, Richard McCormick and Thomas Broughall (who had been in correspondence with the now defeated Girondins in Paris) hesitated. The government informer Samuel Turner (himself a delegate from Newry) reported in June 1797 that while they were still acknowledged as members of the "National Committee" of the United Irishmen meeting in Dublin, they did not attend. Alarmed by the violent and anti-clerical turn of events in France, McKenna had resigned from the society already in 1793.

For many veterans of the Catholic Committee the issue of revolutionary violence had come to a head in April 1794 with the arrest of the Reverend William Jackson. An agent of the French Committee of Public Safety, Jackson had been having meetings with Tone in the prison cell of Archibald Hamilton Rowan then serving time for distributing Drennan's seditious appeal to Volunteers. Thomas Troy, Catholic Archbishop of Dublin and Papal legate, seized the occasion to threaten excommunication for any Catholic who took the United Irish test and to caution his flock against the "fascinating illusions" of French principles.

== See also ==
- Catholic Association
- Cisalpine Club
- Veto controversy
