= Owenmore Gaels GAA =

County Sligo-based Gaelic games club

Owenmore Gaels
- Gaeil na hAbhainn Móire
- Founded: 1885
- County: Sligo
- Colours: Gold and Blue
- Grounds: Connolly Park
- Coordinates: 54°10′40″N 8°29′24″W

Playing kits
Standard colours

Senior Club Championships
	All Ireland	Connacht champions	Sligo champions
Football:	-	-	5

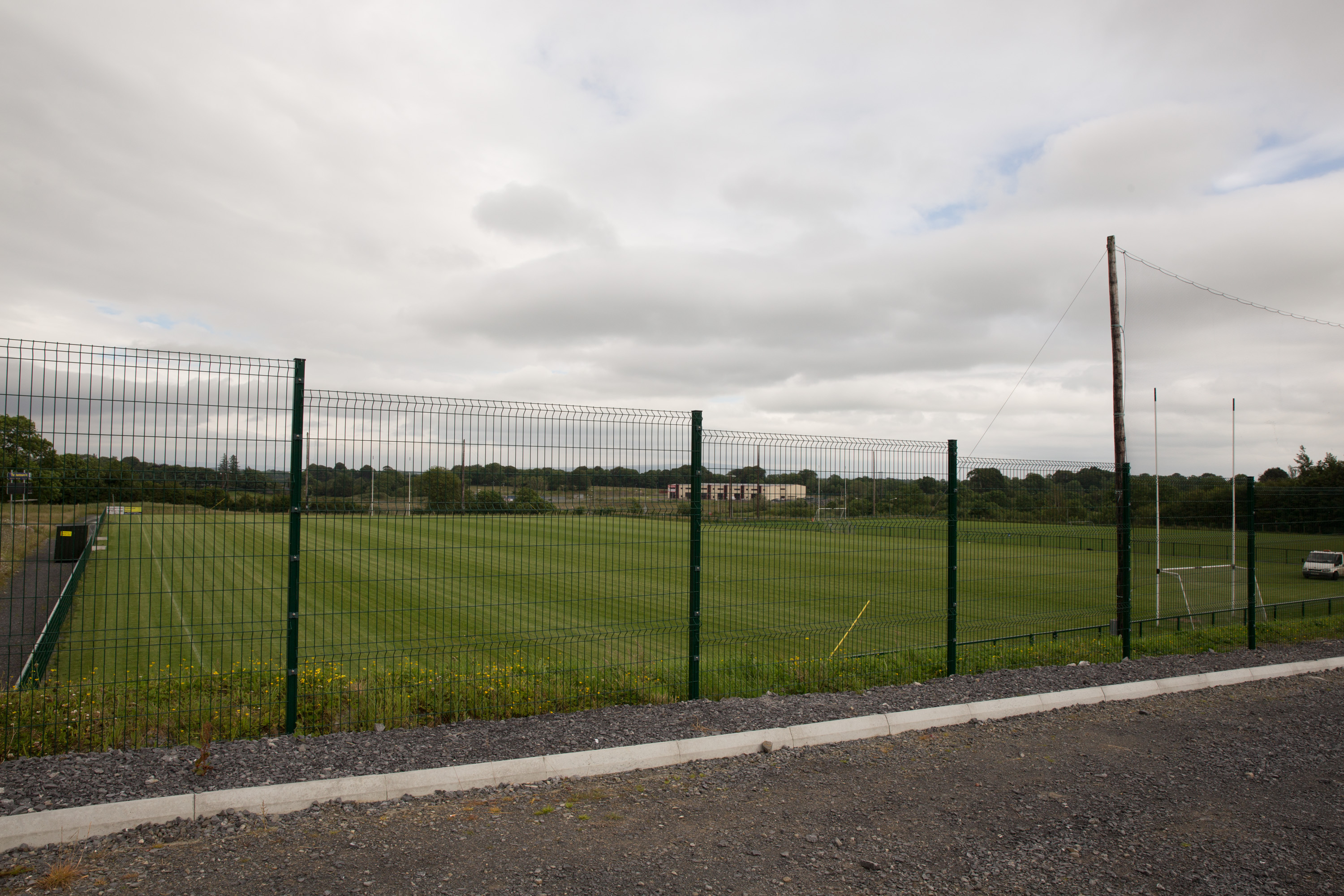
Connolly Park

Owenmore Gaels is a Gaelic Athletic Association club based within the parish of Collooney and Kilvarnet (Ballinacarrow) in County Sligo, Ireland. Its origins date back to the formation of the GAA in Sligo in 1885, when the Collooney Fontenoys club was formed. It went under a number of names, including Collooney Harps and Collooney/Ballisodare, before the current name was adopted in 1976.

The club is named for the Owenmore River which enters the Ballisodare River near to Collooney.

They play at Connolly Park at the southern edge of the town; the grounds are named in honour of local girl Bernadette Connolly, who was the victim of a still-unsolved 1970 murder at the age of 10; it is also named for her father, Gerry Connolly, who worked in the club for decades.

== Honours ==
- Sligo Senior Football Championship: 5
  - 1942, 1943, 1965 (as Collooney Harps)
  - 1967, 1969 (as Collooney/Ballisodare)
- Sligo Junior Football Championship: 5
  - 1930, 1962 (as Collooney Harps)
  - 2015, 2023, 2026 (as Owenmore Gaels)
- Sligo Under 20 Football Championship: 2
  - 1982, 1984
- Sligo Minor Football Championship: 9
  - 1940, 1943, 1944, 1961, 1962, 1963, 1965 (as Collooney Harps)
  - 1947, 1958 (as Ballinacarrow)
- Sligo Under-16 Football Championship: 1
  - 2014
- Sligo Senior Football League (Division 1): (3)
  - 1963, 1964, 1966 (as Collooney Harps)
- Sligo Intermediate Football League Division 3 (ex Div. 2): 4
  - 1982, 2012, 2015, 2018
- Sligo Intermediate Football League (Division 4): 2
  - 2006, 2010
- Sligo Football League Division 4B: 1
  - 2023
- Benson Cup: 1
  - 1993
- Abbott Cup: 1
  - 2015
