= Bartholomew Teeling =

Irish military officer and nationalist

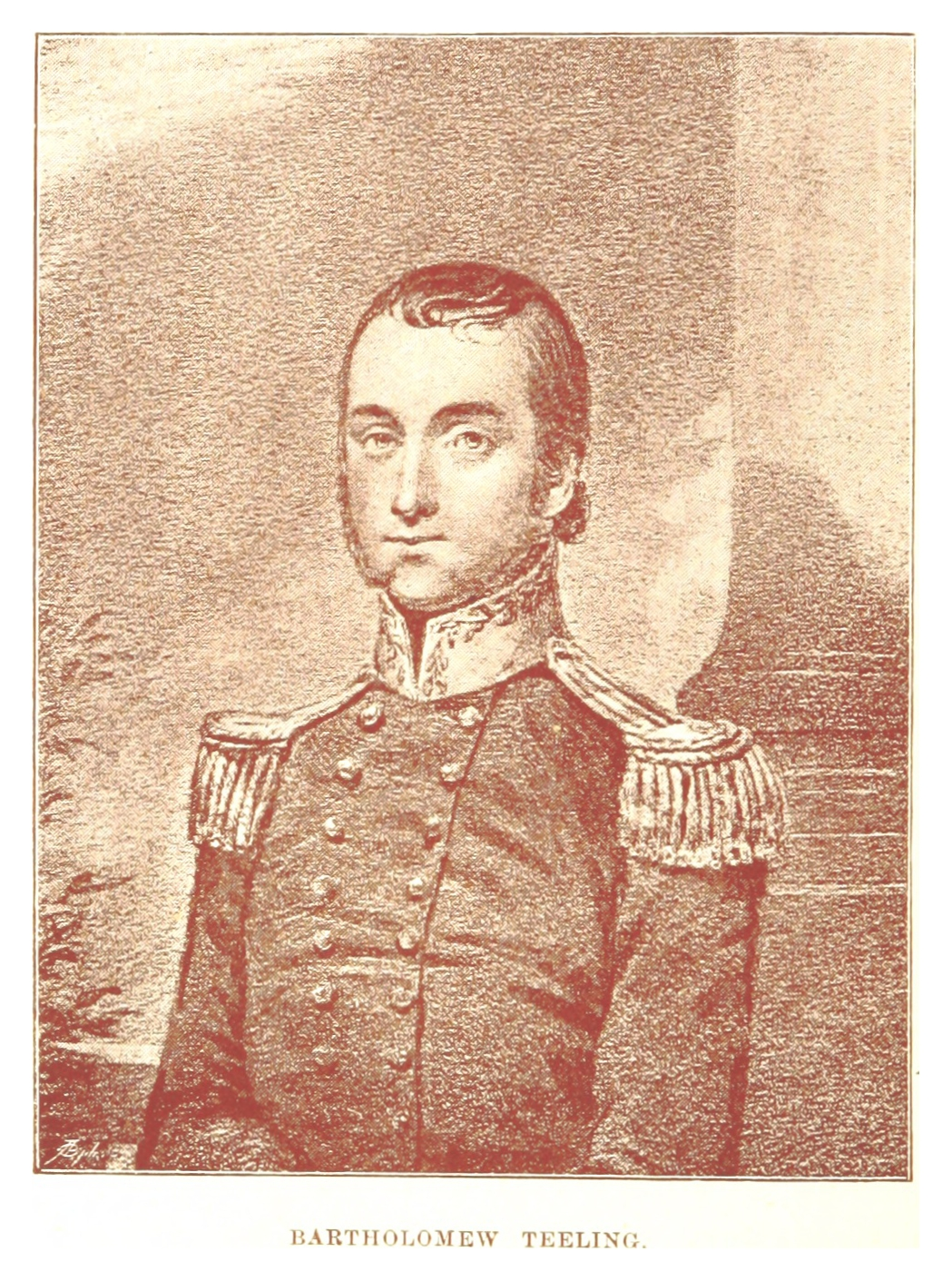
- An 1888 portrait of Teeling
- Born: c. 1774; Lisburn, County Antrim, Ireland
- Died: 24 September 1798 (aged 23–24); Arbour Hill Prison, Dublin, Ireland
- Cause of death: Executed by Hanging
- Burial place: Croppies' Acre, Dublin (suspected)
- Military career
- Allegiance: Irish Republic
- Branch: Society of United Irishmen; French Revolutionary Army
- Conflicts: Irish Rebellion of 1798; Battle of Castlebar; Battle of Collooney; Battle of Ballinamuck (executed)

Bartholomew Teeling (c. 1774 – 24 September 1798) was an Irish military officer and nationalist who was the leader of the rebel forces during the Irish Rebellion of 1798 and who carried out an act of bravery during the Battle of Collooney. He was captured at the Battle of Ballinamuck and subsequently executed for treason.

== Early life ==
Bartholomew Teeling was born c. 1774 in Lisburn, County Antrim, the son of a wealthy Catholic linen manufacturer. Growing up, Teeling was educated at the Dubordieu School in Lisburn. His younger brother Charles went on to be a writer. In 1795, the two brothers joined the Society of United Irishmen and helped cement the organisation's alliance with the Defenders. In County Down, their brother-in-law, John Magennis, was the "Grand Master" of the Defenders. In 1796, Batholomew travelled to France to encourage support for a French invasion of Ireland.

== Irish Rebellion of 1798 ==
=== Landing at Killala ===
In 1798, the Irish Rebellion of 1798 against British rule in Ireland broke out. Teeling returned to Ireland on 22 August 1798, as an aide-de-camp to General Jean Humbert, and landed at Killala Bay between County Sligo and Mayo with a force of French troops. On 28 August, Humbert's men captured Castlebar and the United Irishmen subsequently established the Republic of Connacht. Humbert's troops, having combined forces with local rebels, pushed east through County Sligo but were halted by a cannon which government forces had installed above Union Rock near Collooney.

=== Battle of Collooney ===
On 5 September 1798, Teeling participated in the Battle of Collooney. He cleared the way for a Franco-Irish victory by single-handedly disabling the cannon installed at Union Rock during the battle after breaking from the French ranks and galloping towards the enemy armed with a pistol. Teeling killed the gunner manning the cannon and captured it, allowing the combined Franco-Irish force to advance and forcing their opponents to retreat towards their barracks in Sligo, having suffered 60 men killed and 100 captured.

=== Battle of Ballinamuck and execution ===
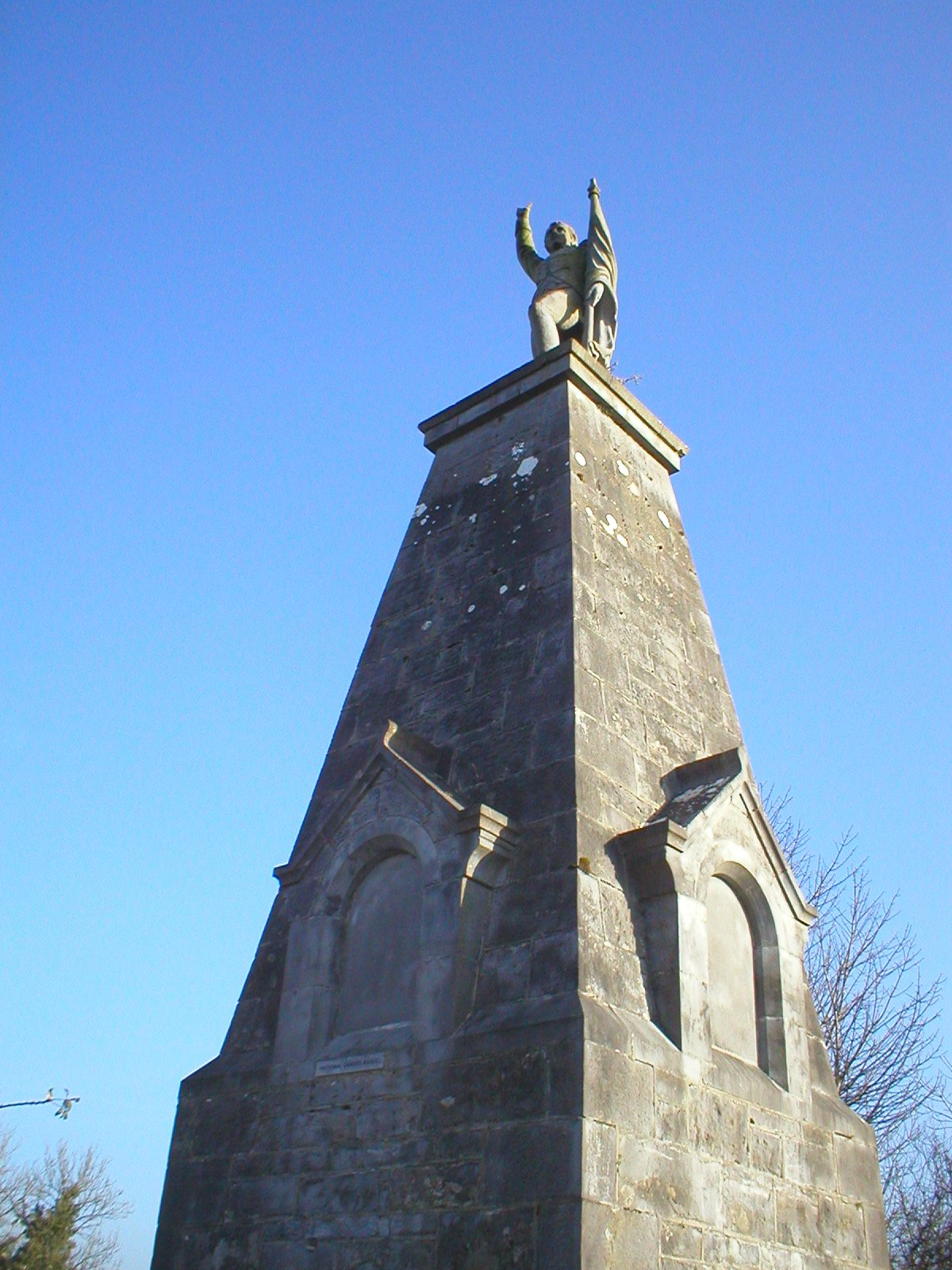
The Teeling Monument near Colloney, County Sligo.

During the Battle of Ballinamuck, which was fought near Longford, Teeling and approximately 500 other Irishmen were captured along with their French allies. The French were treated by the Dublin Castle administration as prisoners of war and were eventually returned to France, but the Irish prisoners were executed. Teeling was court-martialled after his capture. To positively identify him, the authorities enlisted William Coulson, a damask manufacturer from Lisburn, who identified him as a son of Luke Teeling, a linen merchant who lived in Chapel Hill, Lisburn. Teeling was hanged at Arbour Hill Prison in Dublin.

Teeling attempted to read the following statement from the scaffold, but was not permitted to:

Fellow-citizens, I have been condemned by a military tribunal to suffer what they call an ignominious death, but what appears, from the number of its illustrious victims, to be glorious in the highest degree. It is not in the power of men to abase virtue nor the man who dies for it. His death must be glorious in the field of battle or on the scaffold.

The same Tribunal which has condemned me —Citizens, I do not speak to you here of the constitutional right of such a Tribunal, —has stamped me a traitor. If to have been active in endeavouring to put a stop to the blood-thirsty policy of an oppressive Government has been treason, I am guilty. If to have endeavoured to give my native country a place among the nations of the earth was treason, then I am guilty indeed. If to have been active in endeavouring to remove the fangs of oppression from the head of the devoted Irish peasant was treason, I am guilty.

Finally, if to have striven to make my fellow-men love each other was guilt, then I am guilty. You, my countrymen, may perhaps one day be able to tell whether these were the acts of a traitor or deserved death. My own heart tells me they were not and, conscious of my innocence, I would not change my present situation for that of the highest of my enemies.

Fellow-citizens, I leave you with the heartfelt satisfaction of having kept my oath as a United Irishman, and also with the glorious prospect of the success of the cause in which we have been engaged. Persevere, my beloved countrymen. Your cause is the cause of Truth. It must and will ultimately triumph.

He is believed to have been buried at the mass grave of rebels at Croppies' Acre, Dublin.

== Statue of Teeling ==
In 1898, the centenary year of the battle, a statue of Teeling was erected in Carricknagat. One of the main streets in Sligo Town, which accommodates the Sligo Courthouse and main Garda Síochána barracks was later named Teeling Street also in honour of Bartholomew Teeling.
