= 2019 Down county football team season =

Down county football team
2019 season
- Manager: Paddy Tally
- Stadium: Páirc Esler, Newry
- NFL D3: 3rd
- All-Ireland SFC: Round 2 qualifier
- Ulster SFC: Quarter-finalist
- Dr McKenna Cup: Group stage (3rd)

The following is a summary of Down county football team's 2019 season. This season marked the 25th anniversary of Down's last All-Ireland SFC win in 1994, which is also the year they last won the Ulster SFC. On 24 August 2018, Paddy Tally was announced as the new Down manager following the resignation of Éamonn Burns.

== Kits ==
Home	Away

== Competitions ==
Win Draw Loss Postponed/Cancelled

=== Dr McKenna Cup ===
The draw for the 2019 Dr McKenna Cup was made in December 2018. It was the first time in recent history that the competition would start in the previous calendar year as the regular season, with games starting in December 2018. Down finished 3rd in the group following defeats to Cavan and Donegal.

==== Fixtures ====
Date	Round	Home	Score	Away	Ground	Ref
30 Dec 2018	Group	Cavan	0-13 v 1-09	Down	Breffni Park, Cavan	
6 Jan 2019	Group	Down	0-10 v 1-17	Donegal	Pairc Esler, Newry	
9 Jan 2019	Group	Down	4-18 v 1-05	Queens University	Pairc Esler, Newry	

==== Table ====
Pos	Team	Pld	W	D	L	PF	PA	PR	Pts	Qualification
1	Donegal	3	3	0	0	64	36	1.778	6	Advance to semi-final
2	Cavan	3	2	0	1	45	38	1.184	4	
3	Down	3	1	0	2	52	41	1.268	2	
4	Queen's University	3	0	0	3	22	68	0.324	0	

Updated to match(es) played on 9 January 2019. Source: Ulster GAA

==== Reports ====
30 December 2018
14:00
Group Stage

Cavan	0-13 - 1-09	Down
Raymond Galligan (0-3, three 45s), Ciaran Brady (0-2), Niall Murray (0-1), Simon Cadden (0-1), Pierce Smith (0-1f), Stephen Smith (0-2, 1f), Conor Madden (0-2), Jack Brady (0-1)	Report	Rory Burns (0-1f), Aaron McClements (0-1), Pat Havern (1-3, 1-0 pen, 1f), Rory Mason (0-1f), Conor McGrady (0-2), Ciaran Harney (0-1)

Breffni Park, Cavan
Referee: M McNally
6 January 2019
14:00
Group Stage

Down	0-10 - 1-17	Donegal
R Johnston (0-1), J Johnston (0-1), P Havern (0-1), C Harney (0-1), C McGrady (0-2), P Devlin (0-3f), E McCabe (0-1)	Report	C McGonigle (1-1); H McFadden (0-1), M McElhinney (0-4); C Thompson (0-1), N O'Donnell (0-3, 2f), P Mogan (0-1); J Brennan (0-2), M Langan (0-2f), M O'Reilly (0-1), O Gallen (0-1)

Páirc Esler, Newry
Referee: Barry Cassidy (Derry)
9 January 2019
19:00
Group Stage

Down	4-18 - 1-05	Queens University
P Havern (2-3), P Devlin (0-5), K McClorey (0-1), D McClements (1-0), C Francis (0-2), R Burns (0-2), C McGrady (0-1), O McCabe (0-1), S Annett (1-0), C Quinn (0-2), J Johnston (0-1)	Report	K Hughes (0-2), R Treanor (0-2), C O'Neil (1-0), J Smith (0-1)

Páirc Esler, Newry

=== National Football League Division 3 ===
Down played in Division Three of the National Football League in 2019.

==== Fixtures and results ====
Fixtures for the 2019 National League were announced on 7 September 2018.

Date	Round	Home	Score	Away	Ground	Ref
Saturday 26 January	Group	Down	1-12 v 2-15	Laois	Páirc Esler, Newry	
Sunday 3 February	Group	Sligo	1-10 v 1-12	Down	Connolly Park, Collooney	
Sunday 9 February	Group	Down	0-10 v 0-09	Westmeath	Páirc Esler, Newry	
Sunday 24 February	Group	Longford	0-08 v 3-07	Down	Pearse Park, Longford	
Sunday 2 March	Group	Down	2-12 v 0-10	Offaly	Páirc Esler, Newry	
Saturday 16 March	Group	Carlow	1-11 v 0-15	Down	Netwatch Cullen Park, Carlow	
Sunday 24 March	Group	Down	1-06 v 0-10	Louth	Páirc Esler, Newry	

===== Results by matchday =====
Round	1	2	3	4	5	6	7
Ground	H	A	H	A	H	A	H
Result	L	W	W	W	W	W	L
Position	7	6	4	2	1	1	3

A = Away; H = Home; W = Win; D = Draw; L = Loss

==== Table ====
Pos	Team	Pld	W	D	L	PF	PA	PD	Pts	Qualification or relegation
1	Westmeath	7	4	2	1	99	84	+15	10 (Note: Westmeath, Laois and Down are ranked by score difference.)	Advance to Division 3 Final
2	Laois	7	5	0	2	117	103	+14	10	Advance to Division 3 Final
3	Down	7	5	0	2	98	85	+13	10	
4	Louth	7	4	1	2	108	88	+20	9	
5	Longford	7	3	1	3	88	88	0	7	
6	Offaly	7	2	1	4	89	99	−10	5	
7	Carlow	7	2	1	4	90	94	−4	5	Relegation to Division 4
8	Sligo	7	0	0	7	92	140	−48	0	Relegation to Division 4

Updated to match(es) played on 1 April 2019. Source: GAA.ie
Rules for classification: 1) League points; 2) Where two teams only are involved – the outcome of the meeting of the two teams in the League; 3) Score difference – subtracting the total scores against from the scores for; 4) Highest total score for; 5) Highest total goals for; 6) A play-off.

==== Reports ====
26 January 2019
19:00
Round 1

Down	1-12 - 2-15	Laois
C Francis (0-1), C McGrady (0-2, 1m), P Devlin (0-4f), P Havern (0-3, 2f), J Johnston (0-1m), D O'Hare (1-1)	Report	C Boyle (0-3), C Murphy (1-1, 0-1f), E O'Carroll (0-8, 5f, 1m), (0-3, 1f, 1m), P Cahillane (1-0)

Páirc Esler, Newry
Referee: M McNally (Monaghan)
3 February 2019
14:00
Round 2

Sligo	1-10 - 1-12	Down
P Hughes 1-2, L Gaughan 0-2, S Carribine 0-2, N Murphy 0-3, A Devaney 0-1	Report	P Devlin 0-2, P Havern 0-1, J Johnston 0-1, R Johnston 0-2, D O'Hare 0-4, C Mooney 1-2

Connolly Park, Collooney
Referee: P Hughes (Armagh)
9 February 2019
19:00
Round 3

Down	0-10 - 0-09	Westmeath
Conor Poland (0-01), Kevin McKernan (0-01), Ryan Johnston (0-03), Donal O'Hare (0-04, 0-03f), Jerome Johnstone (0-01, 0-01m)	Report	James Dolan (0-01), Boidu Sayeh (0-01), Sam Duncan (0-02), Ronan O'Toole (0-01), Luke Loughlin (0-01), Ger Egan (0-03, 0-03f)

Páirc Esler, Newry
Referee: David Gough (Meath)
24 February 2019
14:00
Round 4

Longford	0-08 - 3-07	Down
D Gallagher (0-4,2f, ‘14), L Connerton (0-2), C Berry (0-2,1f)	Report	G Collins (0-1), C Poland (0-1), D O'Hare (3-2,1f), D Guinness (0-1), J Johnston (0-2)

Pearse Park, Longford
Referee: J Molloy (Galway)
2 March 2019
19:00
Round 5

Down	2-12 v 0-10	Offaly
O'Hare 0-6, Quinn 2-0, Mooney 0-2, McKernan 0-1, O'Hagan 0-1, Johnston 0-1, R Burns 0-1	Report	Allen 0-6, Horan 0-2, Cunningham 0-1, McNamee 0-1

Páirc Esler, Newry
Referee: A Nolan (Wicklow)
16 March 2019
15:00
Round 6

Carlow	1-11 v 0-15	Down
Eoghan Ruth (1-00), Brendan Murphy (0-01), Jordan Morrissey (0-01), Darragh Foley (0-07fs), Diarmuid Walshe (0-02fs)	Report	Darren O'Hagan (0-01), Caolan Mooney (0-01); Daniel Guinness (0-01), Conor Poland (0-02), Donal O'Hare (0-05, 4fs), Ryan Johnston (0-1), Paul Devlin (0-4)

Dr Cullen Park, Carlow
Referee: J Bermingham (Cork)
23 March 2019
14:00
Round 7

Down	1-06 v 0-10	Louth
Darren O'Hagan (1-01), Caolan Mooney (0-01), Ryan Johnston (0-01), Conor Poland (0-01), Paul Devlin (0-01)	Report	Fergal Donohoe (0-01), Tommy Durnin (0-01), James Califf (0-02), Sam Mulroy (0-05, 0-05f), Declan Byrne (0-01)

Pairc Esler, Newry
Referee: M McNally (Monaghan)

=== Ulster Senior Football Championship ===
The draw for the 2019 Ulster Senior Football Championship took place on 12 October 2018.

==== Fixtures ====
Date	Round	Team 1	Score	Team 2	Ground	Ref
19 May 2019	Quarter Final	Down	3-13 v 2-17	Armagh	Pairc Esler, Newry	

==== Bracket ====
Preliminary round 12 May 2019
Tyrone	1-19
Derry	1-13

Quarter-finals; 18, 19, 25, 26 May 2019
Cavan	1-13
Monaghan	0-12
Down	3-13
Armagh	2-17
Fermanagh	0-09
Donegal	0-15
Antrim	2-09
Tyrone	2-23

Semi-finals; 2 & 8 June 2019
Cavan (R)	0-17; 0-23
Armagh (R)	1-14; 0-17
Donegal	1-16
Tyrone	0-15

Final; 23 June 2019
Cavan	2-16
Donegal	1-24

==== Reports ====
19 May 2019
16:00 IST (UTC+1)
Quarter-Final B

Report

Down	3-13 (22) – (23) 2-17 (a.e.t.)	Armagh
(HT: 1-05 – 0-07) (FT: 2-10 – 1-13)
Gls: Donal O'Hare, Paul Devlin, Pat Havern; Pts: Donal O'Hare (2, 2f), Paul Devlin (2, 2f), Pat Havern, James Guinness (2), Jerome Johnston (2, f), Conor Poland, Conor Francis, Connaire Harrison, Barry O'Hagan		Gls: Mark Shields, Andrew Murnin; Pts: Rian O'Neill (8, 4f), Jamie Clarke (2), Ryan Kennedy (2), Stefan Campbell (2), Aidan Nugent, James Morgan, Andrew Murnin

Páirc Esler, Newry
Referee: Anthony Nolan (Wicklow)
Attendance: 15,116

=== All-Ireland Senior Football Championship ===
Down entered the 2019 All-Ireland Senior Football Championship in Round 1 of the qualifiers. Following a win over Tipperary in Round 1 Down progressed into the 2nd round of the All Ireland qualifiers where they were defeated by Mayo bringing an end to their 2019 campaign.

==== Fixtures ====
Date	Round	Team 1	Score	Team 2	Ground	Ref
9 June 2019	Round 1	Down	1-13 v 1-10	Tipperary	Pairc Esler. Newry	
22 June 2019	Round 2	Down	1-11 v 1-16	Mayo	Pairc Esler. Newry	

==== Reports ====
9 June 2019 Round 1	Down	1-13 – 1-10	Tipperary	Newry
14:00 IST (UTC+1)				Venue: Páirc Esler
	Gls: Donal O'Hare 1-0; Pts: Pat Havern and Cory Quinn 0-3 each, Connaire Harrison 0-2, Jerome Johnstone, Rory Burns (45), Barry O'Hagan, Paul Devlin and Darren O'Hagan 0-1 each	Report	Gls: Philip Austin 1-1; Pts: Conor Sweeney 0-4 (4fs), Liam McGrath 0-2, Michael Quinlavin, Jack Kennedy (45) and Liam Casey 0-1 each	Referee: F Kelly (Longford)

22 June 2019 Round 2	Down	1-11 – 1-16	Mayo	Newry
19:00 IST (UTC+1)				Venue: Páirc Esler
	Gls: C Mooney (1-1); Pts: P Havern (0-1), D O'Hare (0-3, 2fs), C Harrison (0-2), C Quinn (0-2), J Johnston (0-1), O McCabe (0-1)	Report	Gls: C Loftus (1-4, 3fs); Pts: L Keegan (0-3), A Moran (0-2), F McDonagh (0-2), C Barrett (0-1), D O'Connor (0-1), A O’Shea (0-1), K McLoughlin (0-1), C Treacy (0-1)	Referee: F Kelly (Longford)
