= Templehouse Lough =

Lake in Ireland

- Loch Theach an Teampla (Irish)
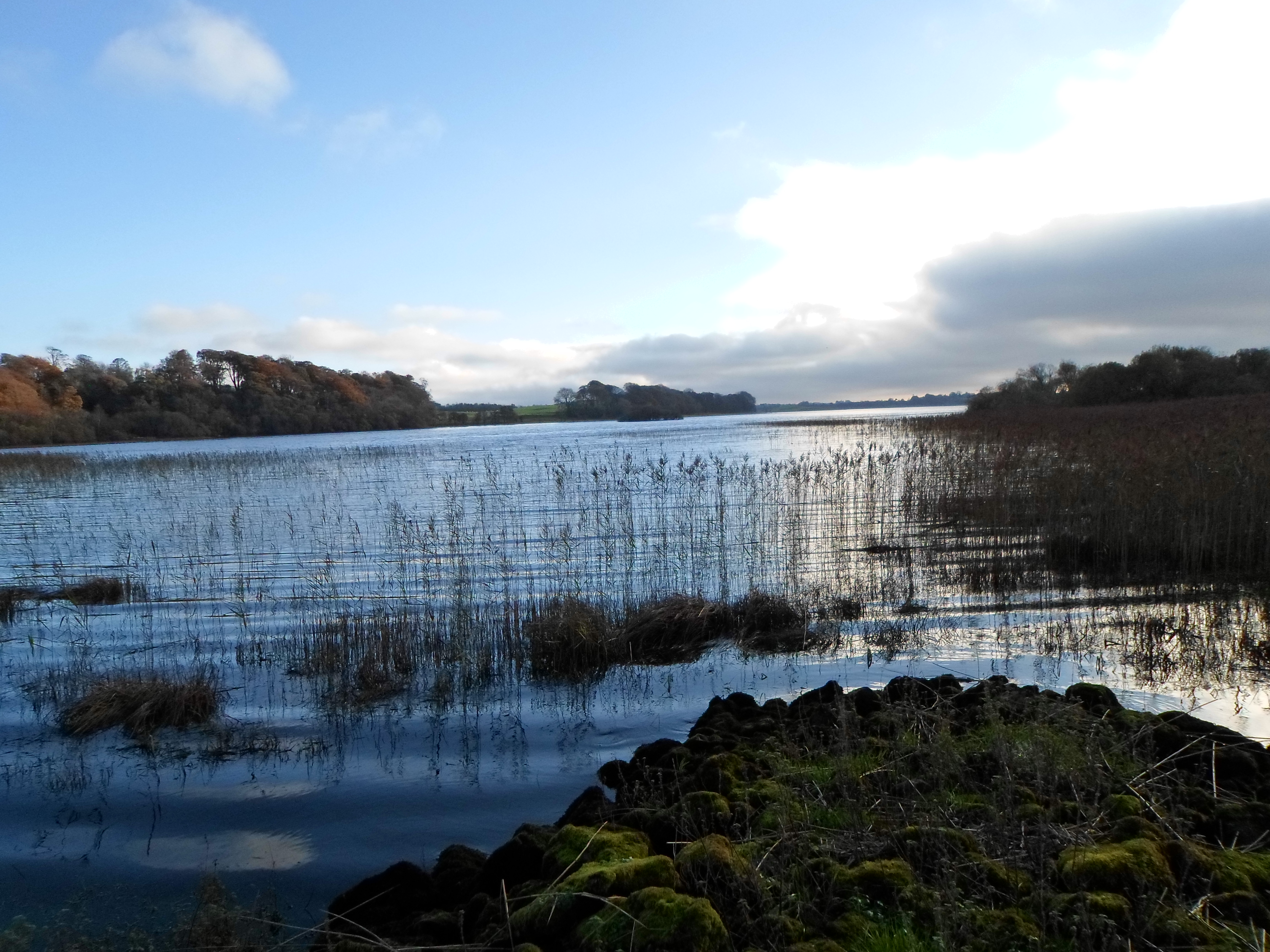

- Location in Ireland
- Location: County Sligo
- Coordinates: 54°6′17″N 8°35′21″W
- Primary inflows: Owenmore River and other streams
- Primary outflows: Owenmore River
- Catchment area: 268.54 km^{2} (104 sq mi)
- Basin countries: Ireland
- Max. length: 2 km (1.2 mi)
- Max. width: 0.5 km (0.3 mi)
- Surface area: 1.19 km^{2} (0.46 sq mi)
- Average depth: 2.6 m (9 ft)
- Max. depth: 5.3 m (17 ft)
- Surface elevation: 54 m (177 ft)

Templehouse Lough (Irish: Loch Theach an Teampla; also Templehouse Lake) is a freshwater lake in the northwest of Ireland. It is located in south County Sligo and forms part of the course of the Owenmore River.

== Geography ==
Templehouse Lough lies about 22 kilometres (14 mi) south of Sligo and 6 km (4 mi) west of Ballymote. The lake covers 1.19 km^{2} (0.46 sq mi) in area and is about 2 km (1.2 mi) long from north to south. The lake has numerous crannogs (artificial islands).

== Hydrology ==
Templehouse Lough is fed by the Owenmore River and other streams entering at the lake's southern end. The lake drains north into the continuation of the Owenmore River, which then flows north to join the Ballysadare River.

== Natural history ==
Fish present in Templehouse Lough include roach, perch, pike and the critically endangered European eel. A number of duck species winter at the lake including teal, wigeon, mallard, tufted duck and goldeneye. Wader bird species include lapwing, curlew and Greenland white-fronted goose. Other bird species found at the lake include mute swan, great crested grebe and heron.

Templehouse Lough is part of the Templehouse and Cloonacleigha Loughs Special Area of Conservation as a hard water lake habitat.

== See also ==
- List of loughs in Ireland
- List of Special Areas of Conservation in the Republic of Ireland
