= Battle of Ballinamuck =

Battle during the 1798 Rebellion in Ireland

- Part of the Irish Rebellion
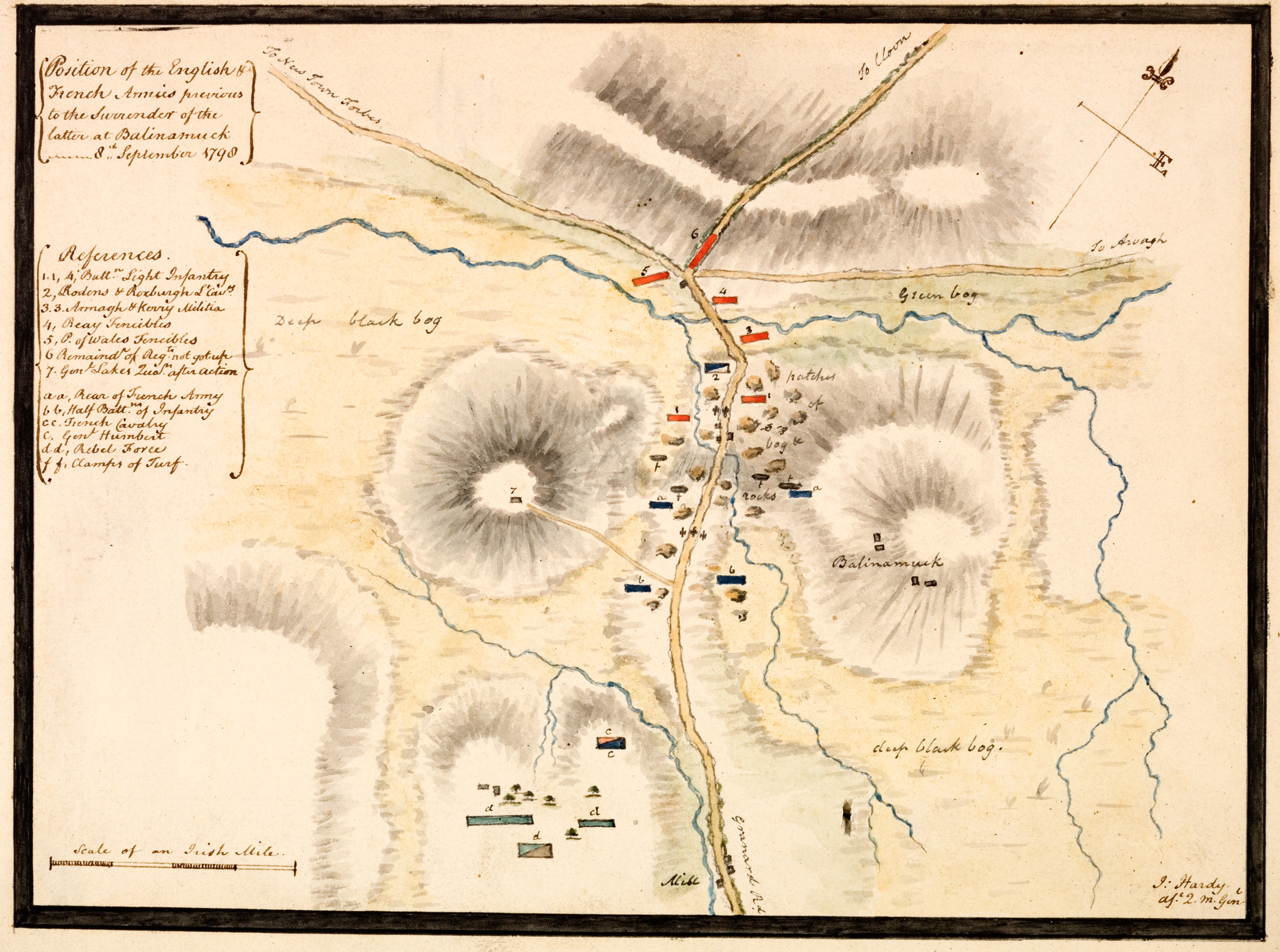
- Contemporary plan of the Ballinamuck battle-ground, marking the positions of the opposing forces
Date	8 September 1798
Location	53.8667°N 7.7167°W; Ballinamuck, County Longford
Result	British victory

Belligerents
United Irishmen; France	(Kingdom of Great Britain) British Army: (Kingdom of Ireland) Irish loyalists

Commanders and leaders
Jean Humbert (surrendered); Bartholomew Teeling (executed)	Charles Cornwallis; Gerard Lake

Strength
~2,350	~26,000

Casualties and losses
~500 dead 1,144 captured ~200 prisoners executed	~12 dead 16 wounded

The Battle of Ballinamuck (8 September 1798) marked the defeat of the main force of the French incursion during the 1798 Rebellion in Ireland.

== Background ==
The victory of General Humbert at the Battle of Castlebar, despite gaining him around 5,000 extra Irish recruits, had not led to a renewed outbreak of the rebellion in other areas as hoped; the defeat of the earlier revolt had devastated the Irish republican movement to the extent that few were willing to renew the struggle. A massive British force of 26,000 men was assembled under Lord Cornwallis, the new Lord Lieutenant of Ireland, and was steadily moving west. Humbert abandoned Castlebar and moved towards Ulster, with the apparent intention of igniting an uprising there. He defeated a blocking force of government troops at Collooney in County Sligo. Following reports that rebellions had broken out in County Westmeath and County Longford, he altered course.

Humbert crossed the River Shannon at Ballintra Bridge on 7 September, destroying it behind them, and continued to Drumshanbo where they spent the night - halfway between his landing-point and Dublin. News reached him of the defeat of the Westmeath and Longford rebels at Wilson's Hospital School at Multyfarmham and Granard from the trickle of rebels who had survived the slaughter and reached his camp. With Cornwallis' huge force blocking the road to Dublin, facing constant harassment of his rearguard and the pending arrival of General Lake's command, Humbert decided to make a stand the next day at the townland of Ballinamuck on the Longford/Leitrim county border.

== Battle ==
Humbert faced over 12,000 Irishmen and English forces. General Lake was close behind with 14,000 men, and Cornwallis was on his right at Carrick-on-Shannon with 15,000. The battle began with a short artillery duel followed by a dragoon charge on exposed Irish rebels. There was a brief struggle when French lines were breached which only ceased when Humbert signalled his intention to surrender and his officers ordered their men to lay down their muskets. The battle lasted little more than an hour.

While the French surrender was being taken, the 1,000 or so Irish allies of the French under Colonel Teeling, an Irish officer in the French army, held onto their arms without signalling the intention to surrender or being offered terms. An attack by infantry followed by a dragoon charge broke and scattered the Irish who were pursued into a bog where they were either bayoneted or drowned.

== Aftermath ==
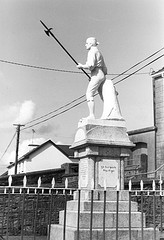
Memorial of rebel pikeman, erected in Ballinamuck in 1928

A total of 96 French officers and 746 men were taken prisoner. British losses were initially reported as 3 killed and 16 wounded or missing, but the number of killed alone was later reported as 12. Approximately 500 French and Irish lay dead on the field. 200 Irish prisoners were taken in the mopping-up operations, almost all of whom were later hanged, including Matthew Tone, brother of Wolfe Tone. The prisoners were moved to Carrick-on-Shannon Gaol. The French were given prisoner of war status however the Irish were not and some were hanged and buried in St Johnstown, today known as Ballinalee, where most were executed in a field what is known locally as Bully's Acre.

Humbert and his men were transported by canal to Dublin and exchanged for British prisoners of war. Government forces subsequently slowly spread out into the rebel-held "Irish Republic", engaging in numerous skirmishes with rebel holdouts. These sweeps reached their climax in 23 September when Killala was captured by government forces. During these sweeps, suspected rebels were frequently summarily executed while many houses thought to be housing rebels were burnt. French prisoners of war were swiftly repatriated, while United Irishmen rebels were executed. Numerous rebels took to the countryside and continued guerrilla operations, which took government forces some months to suppress. The defeat at Ballinamuck left a strong imprint on Irish social memory and featured strongly in local folklore. Numerous oral traditions were later collected about the battle, principally in the 1930's by historian Richard Hayes and the Irish Folklore Commission.
