= Battle of Collooney =

Battle of French and Irish forces

Battle of Collooney / Carricknagat
- Part of the Irish Rebellion
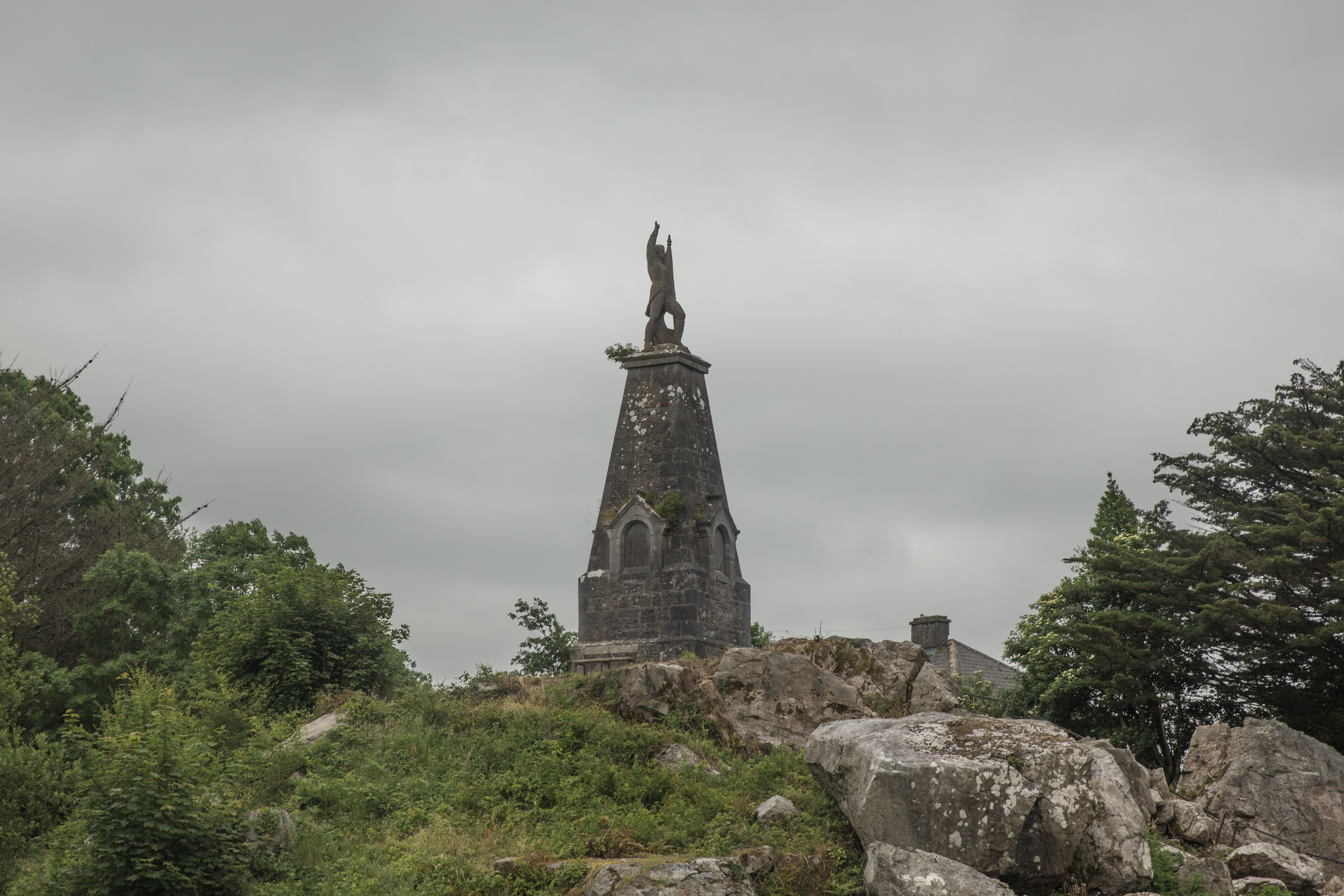
- The monument commemorating the battle.
Date	5 September 1798
Location	Collooney, County Sligo 54.1917°N 8.4932°W
Result	Irish/French victory

Belligerents
United Irishmen; France	(Kingdom of Great Britain) British Army: (Kingdom of Ireland) Irish loyalists

Commanders and leaders
Jean Humbert; Bartholomew Teeling	Sir Gerard Lake; Charles Vereker

Strength
2,000–3,000	~500

Casualties and losses
10 dead	60 dead, 100 captured

The Battle of Collooney, also called the Battle of Carricknagat, refers to a battle which occurred on 5 September during the Irish Rebellion of 1798 when a combined force of French troops and Irish rebels defeated a force of British troops outside of Collooney near Sligo Town.

== Background ==
A long-anticipated French landing to assist the Irish rebellion had taken place on 22 August, when almost 1,100 troops under the command of General Humbert landed at Kilcummin Strand (Cill Chuimín), Killala Bay, County Mayo. Although the force was small, the remote location ensured an unopposed landing away from the tens of thousands of British soldiers concentrated in the east in Leinster, engaged in mopping up operations against remaining pockets of rebels. The nearby town of Killala was quickly captured after a brief resistance by local yeomen and Ballina was also taken two days later, following the rout of a force of cavalry sent from the town to oppose their march. Irish volunteers began to trickle into the French camp from all over Mayo following the news of the French landing.

The victory of General Humbert at Castlebar, despite gaining him about 5,000 Irish recruits, had not led to a renewed outbreak of the rebellion as hoped. A British army of some 26,000 men was assembled under Field Marshal Lord Cornwallis, the newly appointed Lord Lieutenant of Ireland, and was steadily moving towards his forces. Abandoning Castlebar, Humbert moved towards Ulster via Sligo with the intention of igniting a rising there.

== Battle ==
The combined Franco-Irish forces marched northeast towards Sligo on their way to County Donegal in Ulster. When they got to the village of Collooney they were confronted by a unit of British troops from the garrison in Sligo, which is approximately five miles to the north of Collooney. A minor battle ensued at Carricknagat, a small townland to the immediate north of Collooney, hence the alternate name for the battle: the Battle of Carricknagat.

On 5 September 1798, the Franco-Irish troops pushed north through County Sligo but were halted by a cannon which the British forces had installed above Union Rock near Collooney.

A young Irish aide to General Humbert, Lieutenant Bartholomew Teeling, distinguished himself during the encounter. Teeling cleared the way for the advancing Irish-French army by single-handedly disabling a British gunnery post located high on Union Rock when he broke from the French ranks and galloped towards the gunner's position. Teeling was armed with a pistol and he shot the cannon's marksman and captured the cannon. After the loss of the cannon position the French and Irish advanced and the British retreated towards their barracks at Sligo, leaving 120 dead and 100 prisoners.

Colonel Charles Vereker, who commanded the Limerick militia in the standoff, was awarded a peerage for his role in the battle.

== Teeling monument ==
In 1898, the centenary year of the battle, a statue of Teeling was erected in Carricknagat.
