= Carrickbanagher =

Carrickbanagher Carraig Uí Bheannacháin
- Townland
- Location in Ireland
- Coordinates: 54°08′13″N 8°29′53″W
- Country: Ireland
- Province: Connacht
- County: County Sligo

Area
  - Total: 5.45 km^{2} (2.10 sq mi)
- Time zone: UTC+0 (WET)
  - Summer (DST): UTC-1 (IST (WEST))

Carrickbanagher (Irish: Carraig Uí Bheannacháin or Carraig Beannchar meaning "rock of the points") is a townland in County Sligo, Ireland between the towns of Collooney and Ballymote.

Carrickbanagher has an area of approximately 5.3 square kilometres (2 sq mi), and had a population of 121 people as of the 2011 census.
