= James Wills (cricketer) =

Irish cricketer

Personal information
- Full name: James Robertson Wills
- Born: 2 May 1899; Killala, Ireland
- Died: 16 April 1949 (aged 49); Saint Saviour, Jersey
- Batting: Right-handed
- Bowling: Right-arm fast-medium

Domestic team information
- Years: Team
- 1922–1926: Dublin University
- 1922: Ireland

Career statistics
| Competition | First-class |
|---|---|
| Matches | 4 |
| Runs scored | 66 |
| Batting average | 9.42 |
| 100s/50s | –/– |
| Top score | 28 |
| Balls bowled | 516 |
| Wickets | 7 |
| Bowling average | 33.71 |
| 5 wickets in innings | – |
| 10 wickets in match | – |
| Best bowling | 3/5 |
| Catches/stumpings | 1/– |
- Source: Cricinfo, 2 November 2018

James Robertson Wills (2 May 1899 – 16 April 1949) was an Irish first-class cricketer.

Wills was born at Killala in County Mayo, and was educated at the Masonic Boys' School in Dublin. He later studied at Trinity College, Dublin in 1915, where he joined Dublin University Cricket Club. He made his debut in first-class cricket for Dublin University against Essex at Brentwood on their 1922 tour of England. Following this match, he travelled up to Glasgow to play a first-class match for Ireland against Scotland. He later toured England with Dublin University in 1925 and 1926, playing two further first-class matches, both against Northamptonshire at Northampton. Across his four first-class matches, Wills scored 68 runs, with a highest score of 28. With his fast-medium bowling, he took 7 wickets at an average of 33.71, with best figures of 3/5. He later played club cricket for Phoenix. He died at Saint Saviour, Jersey in April 1949.
