= Battle of Castlebar =

Battle of the Irish Rebellion of 1798

- Part of the Irish Rebellion of 1798
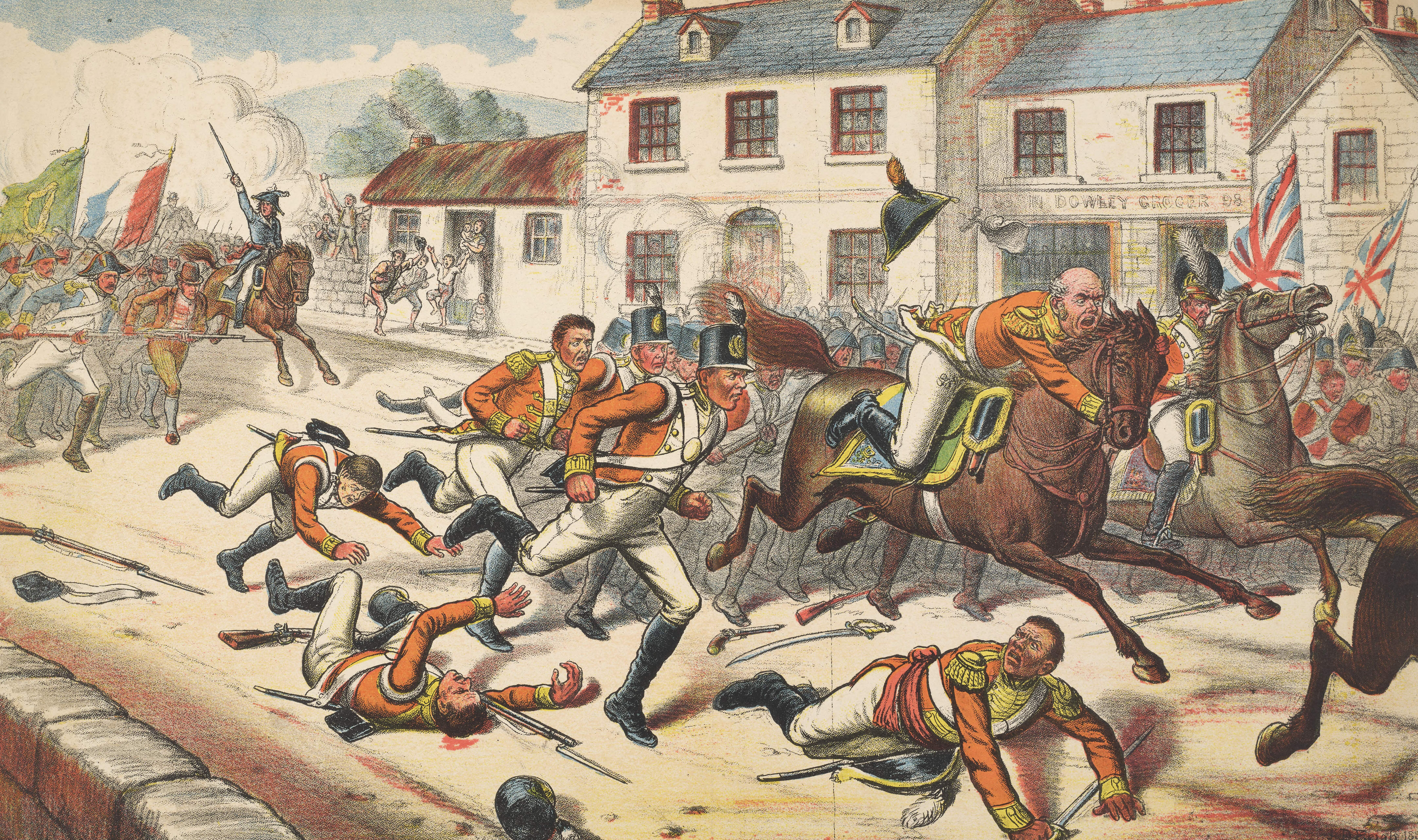
- 1887 illustration of the battle
| Date | 27 August 1798 |
| Location | Castlebar, County Mayo 53.8608°N 9.2989°W |
| Result | Franco-United Irishmen victory |

Belligerents
| France; United Irishmen | Great Britain; Ireland |

Commanders and leaders
| Jean Humbert; Bartholomew Teeling | Gerard Lake |

Strength
| 1,100 (Note: 800 French and near 2,000 Irish rebels (the latter were little used in combat).) | 3,000–5,000 (Note: Estimates: • 3,000–4,000; • 5,000); 14 cannon, incl. 4 curricle guns |

Casualties and losses
| 200–220 (Note: Estimates: • 200; • 220); • 40 killed; • 180 wounded | 400 killed or wounded; 800 captured; 14 cannon; 8 standards; Baggage and ammunition looted; Official estimate: 366 (Note: fr:Bataille de Castlebar, #Battle); • 53 killed; • 34 wounded; • 279 missing |

The Battle of Castlebar was a military engagement of the Irish Rebellion of 1798, which occurred on 27 August 1798 near the town of Castlebar, County Mayo. A combined force of approximately 800 French troops and 2,000 United Irishmen rebels, commanded by Jean Joseph Amable Humbert, routed a British Crown force numbering from 3,000 to 5,000 men, led by Gerard Lake, 1st Viscount Lake, in what would later become known as the "Castlebar Races" or "Races of Castlebar".

During the battle, the French, although they had veterans in the ranks, fought in an exhausted state after long mountain marches, and the United Irishmen were exhausted for the same reason; Lake's army was in an advantageous defensive position but at the same time had a significant number of untrained Irish militiamen in their ranks, which were routed in the face of the Franco-United Irishmen assault. Lake's army included such regular regiments as the Fraser Fencibles, Roden's Fencible Cavalry Dragoons, the 6th Regiment of Foot and the Royal Irish Artillery; all four were engaged at Castlebar and, though fruitlessly, they offered serious resistance, in contrast to the militia regiments. (Note: See also articles about these four regiments for more details and references.)

== Background ==
On 22 August 1798, almost 1,100 French troops under Jean Joseph Amable Humbert landed at County Mayo to assist the Irish Rebellion of 1798 against British rule in Ireland. Although Humbert's force was small, the remote location ensured an unopposed landing as the French were far from tens of thousands of British Crown troops concentrated around Leinster who were engaged in mopping-up operations against remaining pockets of insurgents there. The French quickly captured the nearby town of Killala after a brief resistance by local yeomanry troops. Moving southwards, Humbert's troops occupied Ballina two days later following the rout of a cavalry force sent from the town to oppose the French. Following the news of the French landing, local Society of United Irishmen volunteers began to trickle into Humbert's camp from all over County Mayo.

The Lord Lieutenant of Ireland, Lord Cornwallis, requested urgent reinforcements from England but in the interim all available forces were concentrated at Castlebar under the command of General Gerard Lake, the victor of the Battle of Vinegar Hill. The build-up of British Crown forces at Castlebar had reached 6,000 soldiers with dozens of artillery pieces and large caches of supplies by dawn of 27 August.

Leaving about 200 French regulars behind in Killala to cover his rear and line of withdrawal, Humbert took a combined force of about 2,000 Frenchmen and United Irishmen rebels on 26 August to march on and capture Castlebar. The obvious nature of Humbert's objective presented Lake's troops there with the apparent advantage of being able to deploy their forces to face a head-on attack from the Ballina road and their forces and artillery were accordingly arranged. However, locals advised the French of an alternative route to Castlebar through the wilds along the west of Lough Conn, which the troops at Castlebar thought impassable for a modern army with attendant artillery train. This route was successfully used and when Lake's scouts spotted the approaching army, the British Crown forces at Castlebar had to hurriedly change the deployment of their entire force to face the threat from this unanticipated direction.

During the evacuation of Ballina, Major Kerr ordered Lt. Thomas of the Royal Roxburgh Fencible Dragoons to take a detachment to Gore castle. This was the seat of the Earls of Arran and home of the tenant James Cuff, 1st Baron Tyrawley.

Major Kerr was acutely concerned as to Cuff’s whereabouts as the two shared a personal and professional friendship, socialising in the same close knit Anglo-Irish circles that commanded Ireland. The order was also one of pragmatism, Cuff was a local MP, major land holder and the Barrack Master General of Ireland, responsible for coordinating military infrastructure and recruitment.

Furthermore, Gore Castle and the older Deel castle nearby, strategically lay on the river Deel. It is believed the construction of the stone bridge spanning the river, which still exists to this day had been completed a few years prior to the invasion. It is suggested in one source that an older bridge existed as opposed to the one that stands today however, no older foundations are visible at the site.

As the next British stronghold was Castlebar, the French would either directly move south through Foxford or march west and south around lough conn, over the Deel and through the nephine mountain range. General Lake and the wider British command assumed the later option to be impossible due to its difficult terrain for a large army.

However, scouts to the estate were still ordered by Major Kerr as it would screen for a French flanking manoeuvre on the one of only two crossings along the river Deel. The second crossing was at Crossmollonia which already had British troops garrisoned there.

In the ensuing retreat out of Ballina, Lt. Thomas had only amassed a handful of horsemen, as there was no bugler to rally troops. The troop arrived at the estate on the evening of 24th August, finding only James Cuff and his two sons, James and Henry who were respectively in their early twenties and late teens.

The estates servants had mostly fled to the United Irishman cause however, a few still loyal to Lord Cuff had joined his mistress, Sarah Wewitzer on a wagon train full of valuables and all but 3 of the estates stallions to Dublin.

Lord Cuff had frantically been trying to hide his remaining valuables in the walls, barricade the windows and entrances before abandoning the estate himself. Relieved to see British cavalry, he agreed to remain with the troop until they could ascertain the next movements of the French army.

Lt. Thomas sent two fencibles to secure the bridge and the majority to ride off in the direction of Ballina to scout for the French army. The remaining fencibles and himself remained at the estate house with Lord Cuff.

At round 1600 on the 26th August, General Humbert and his Franco-Irish army had departed Ballina heading south in the direction of Foxford. He had encouraged his troops to make as much noise as they could and to make loud war cries to deceive any British spies of a direct assault on Foxford.

Convinced by the French ruse, the scouts returned to Lt. Thomas after dark and informed the French were indeed marching on Foxford. Thomas planned to disrupt supply lines or even take Ballina the following day however, at this time a heavy storm was beginning to set in. Realising that the storm along with the loss of daylight would hamper navigation and musketry, he elected to remain in the house with all but two guards stationed under the bridge. They left their horses in the stable connected to the house. The house’s top floors commanded a wide view of the surrounding terrain making Thomas believe he would see any advancing troops far in advance.

Humbert however, had since diverted his army to the west heading for the bridge at the Gore estate. The army had extinguished their torches and were moving in complete silence, taking the British completely by surprise.

Despite orders to stand sentry, most soldiers had gone to sleep, with the temptation of aristocratic comforts immediately at hand.

Irish skirmishes who knew the lay of the land, took the bridge on strict orders from General Humbert. The two sentries had taken shelter in the near by ice house and, taken completely by surprise, were impaled by pikemen.

by now, renegade Irishmen were trying to break into the house for loot. Alerted to the danger, the troop were forced to run to the stables and retreat using an underground passage, common in Georgian estates.

All of the property that had not already been sent to Dublin and England was looted. The staircase was burnt down leaving the estate house significantly damaged but not destroyed.

The bridge, now in Irish hands, cut off the only line of retreat and due to the storm, now in full fury, the river was made unfordable. After a few fencibles had their horses shot under them, British were forced back down the road in the direction of the older Deel castle.

The fencibles were now trapped between the Irish skirmishes at the bridge and the advancing French main army. The estate was now covered in Irish and French troops who had broken ranks to raid the mansion, especially drinking the Lord’s wine collection.

This crucially gave the British time to fortify themselves in the older Deel castle, shooting their horses outside the rear door to the main tower and courtyard to further inhibit the attackers.

The castle tower itself had walls of at least 10 metres thick, multiple murder holes and the courtyard itself had overlapping avenues of fire.

An unorganised attack by Irishmen began however, were driven back due to the formidable defences and effective fire of buck and ball shot.

Lord Cuff evoked the memory of the siege of Derry, shouting “no surrender.” The troop followed suit however, likely out of fear of reprisals for hanging Irish insurgents in Ballina days previous.

As more Frenchmen arrived, sappers flanked the castle and blew a hole in the north wing, a hole which still exists to this day.

The French swarmed inside and after another full frontal attack, all other wings to the tower were taken, the defenders all being put to the bayonet.

The sappers managed to take the ground floor to the tower house and started a fire hoping that its smoke would choke out the remaining defenders. Scorch marks can be seen on the castle walls today. In desperation, some ran out of the castle to which they were bayoneted immediately.

James Cuff, his two sons, Lt. Thomas and only one other managed to escape by jumping from the tower house to the roof of the castles wings and feeling to the south unnoticed.

Lord Cuff knew of a forming ox bow lake and hoped the rivers velocity would be lower. The group managed to cross however, became split up in the dark of the storm. All headed south, rushing to warn General Lake of the flanking manoeuvre.

As General Humbert did not account this conflict in his memoirs, it is likely that the defence ended shortly after the arrival of French regulars and that French casualties were not sustained in significant numbers.

The first to reach Castlebar was Lord Cuff and his sons. Their clothes had been soaked and torn during the fighting. Because of this, they were originally not recognised as landed gentry and their story disbelieved. James asked to speak with General Lake who knew each other however, being a drunkard, General Lake was sleeping. Eventually the remaining two scouts reached Castlebar however, and managed to raise the alarm just in time for the British to move their lines.

Lord Cuff would take part in the ensuing battle of Castlebar and would cover the British retreat. After the rebellion, he took part in the arrests of suspected Irish rebels. He had many hanged or imprisoned for their part in the uprising.

== Battle ==
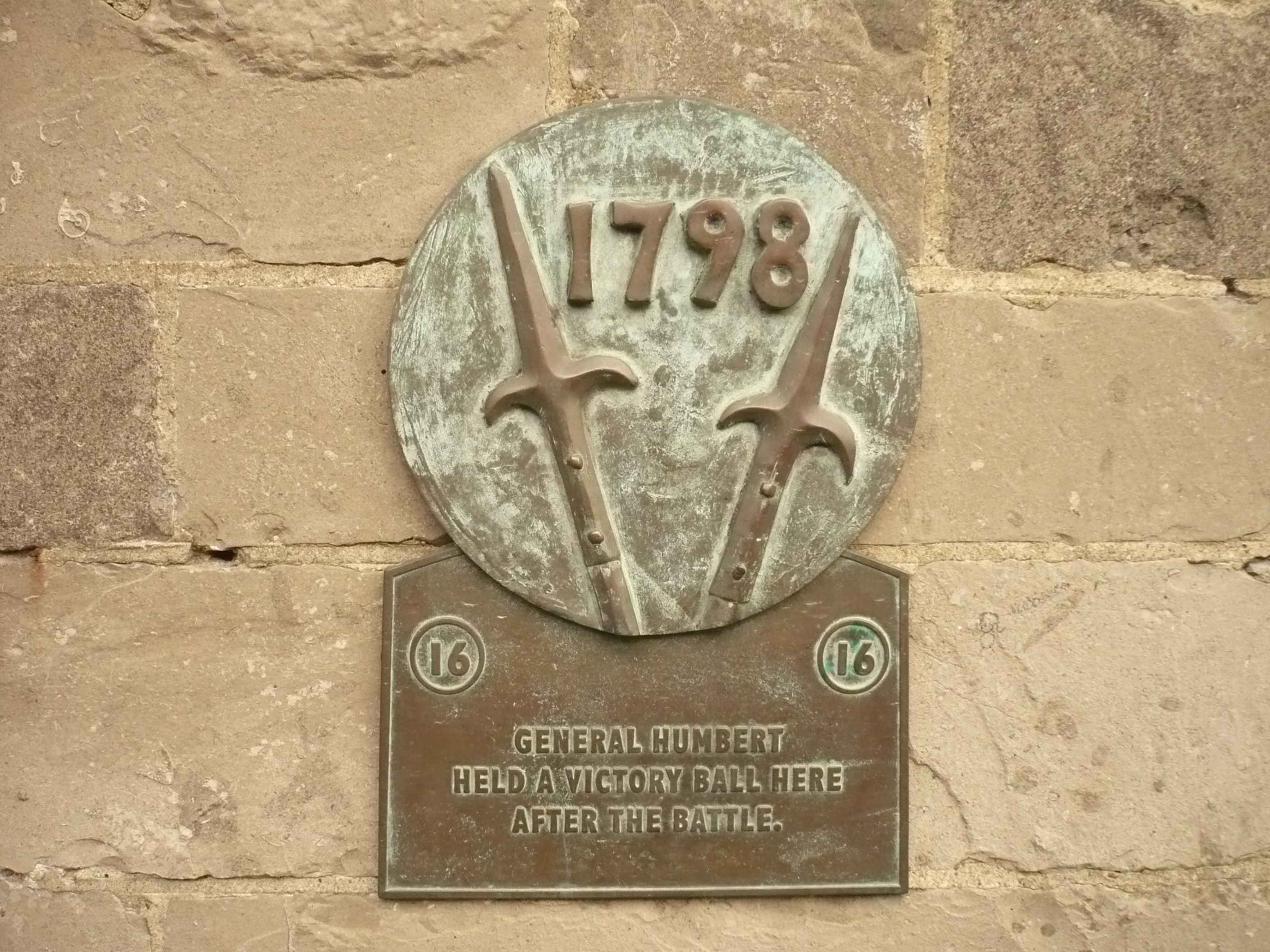
A plaque commemorating the battle

Lake's troops at Castlebar had barely completed their new deployment when Humbert's army appeared outside the town at about 6 a.m. The newly sited British Crown artillery opened up on the advancing attackers and cut them down in droves. French officers, however, quickly identified an area of scrub and undergrowth in a defile facing the centre of the artillery line which interfered with, and provided some cover from the defender's line of fire. The French launched a bayonet charge, the ferocity and determination of which unnerved the infantry units stationed behind the artillery line. The defenders began to waver before the French reached their lines and eventually turned in panic and fled the battlefield, abandoning the gunners and artillery. During these actions, the French were spread out left and right, trying to hit the flanks. On the left, the Fraser Fencibles came into close contact with the enemy. Several Irish militiamen of the Longford and Kilkenny militias ran to join the rebels and even joined in the fighting against their former comrades. A unit of Irish cavalry and British Army infantry attempted to stand and stem the tide of panic but were quickly overwhelmed. Both the 6th Foot and the Irish Artillery were forced to retreat.

In the headlong flight, the defenders of Castlebar abandoned large quantities of guns and equipment, among which was Lake's personal luggage. Although not pursued a mile or two beyond Castlebar, the fleeing troops did not stop until reaching Tuam, with some units fleeing as far as Athlone in the panic. It was Roden's cavalry that was able to counter the advanced pursuing units, but only for a while, and the general rout could not be stopped. The panic was such that only the arrival of Lord Cornwallis at Athlone prevented further flight across the Shannon. Although achieving a spectacular victory, the losses of the French and United Irishmen were high, losing about 150 men, mostly to the cannonade at the start of the battle. Lake's reported casualties were 53 killed, 34 wounded and 279 missing, of the latter around 140 joined the rebels. Following the victory, thousands of Irish volunteers flocked to join the United Irishmen, who also sent a request to France for reinforcements and formally declared a Republic of Connacht.

== Aftermath ==
On 31 August, the rebels proclaimed a "Republic of Connaught" – which lasted 12 days before being retaken. On 5 September, a British Crown force was defeated at the Battle of Collooney but, after that, the rebellion quickly unfolded. More troops gathered and by 8 September their strength was over 15,000. On that day, Cornwallis defeated Humbert at the Battle of Ballinamuck, with Humbert surrendering. The United Irishmen rebels fought on briefly until they were scattered; 200 were captured and 500 killed; Killala was re-taken on 12 September. More French warships sailed for Ireland, but were defeated by the Royal Navy at the Battle of Tory Island. With that the 1798 rebellion ended. Captured French soldiers were sent to England and eventually repatriated to France, but French officers of Irish origin were hanged in Dublin with rebels.

== Bibliography ==
- Beiner, Guy (2007). Remembering the Year of the French: Irish Folk History and Social Memory. Madison: University of Wisconsin Press. ISBN 978-0-299-21824-9.
- Pakenham, T. (1970), The Year of Liberty, London, ISBN 0-8129-3088-6
- Gordon, J.B (1813), "Chapter XV", History of the Rebellion in Ireland in the Year 1798, Philadelphia: John Clarke, & company, pp. 285–287
- Musgrave, Richard (1802), Memoirs of the Different Rebellions in Ireland: ..., vol. 2, Dublin, pp. 151–157
- Bodart, Gaston (1908). Militär-historisches Kriegs-Lexikon (1618–1905).
- Chaignieau, Jean Nicolas (1818). Dictionnaire historique des batailles, sièges, et combats de terre et de mer. Vol. 2. Paris.
