= Juan Picornell =

Spanish-born revolutionary

Juan Bautista Mariano Picornell y Gomila (1759–1825) was a Spanish-born revolutionary.

Picornell studied at the University of Salamanca. In 1795 he was involved in the San Blas Conspiracy which sought to overthrow the Spanish monarchy.

In 1798 Picornell sought unsuccessfully to incite a rebellion in Venezuela.

In 1806 Picornell settled in Philadelphia where he began to conspire for the overthrow of Spanish authority in Texas. He eventually became associated with José Álvarez de Toledo y Dubois and went to Texas in 1812. However, in 1813 after the Battle of the Medina Picornell returned to Philadelphia. Shortly after this he became associated with Jean Joseph Amable Humbert in another attempt to end Spanish control of Texas.

== Sources ==
- short bio of Picornell
- Davis, William C., The Pirates Laffite and The Treacherous World of The Corsairs of the Gulf. (New York: Harcourt, 2005) p. 142-143.
