= Irish Republic (1798) =

Short-lived state in Ireland

- 1798
- Flag Coat of arms
- Motto: Liberty, Equality, Fraternity, Union
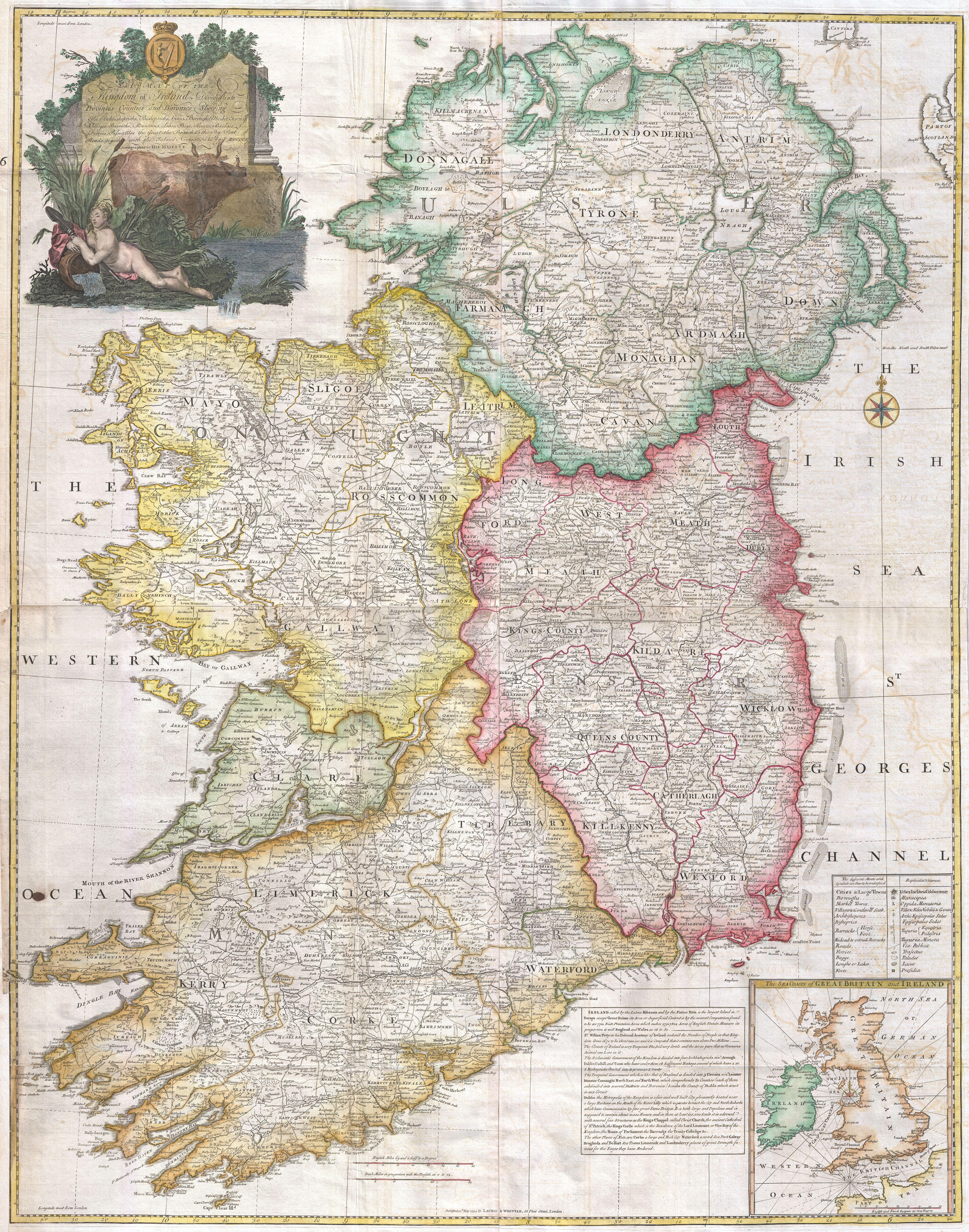
- 1794 map of Ireland
- Status: Sister republic of the French Republic
- Common languages: Irish, English
- Government: Presidential republic
- President
  - 1798: John Moore
- Historical era: French Revolutionary Wars
  - Arrival of French forces: 22 August 1798
  - Appointment of John Moore as president: 31 August 1798
  - Storming of Killala: 23 September 1798
- Currency: Irish pound
Preceded by	Succeeded by
Kingdom of Ireland	Kingdom of Ireland
- Today part of: Ireland

The Irish Republic of 1798, more commonly known as the Republic of Connacht, was a short-lived state proclaimed during the Irish Rebellion of 1798 that resulted from the French Revolutionary Wars. A sister republic of the French Republic, it theoretically covered the whole island of Ireland, but its functional control was limited to only very small parts of the Province of Connacht. Opposing British forces were deployed across most of the country, including the main towns such as Dublin, Belfast and Cork.

== Proclamation ==
At the time of the Rebellion of 1798 a force of 1,000 French soldiers under General Jean Joseph Amable Humbert landed at Killala in County Mayo. General Humbert proclaimed the Irish Republic in his declaration to the people upon landing in Ireland on 22 August 1798:

LIBERTY, EQUALITY, FRATERNITY, UNION, After several unsuccessful attempts, behold at last Frenchmen arrived amongst you... Union, Liberty, the Irish Republic! Such is our shout. Let us march. Our hearts are devoted to you; our glory is in your happiness.

After the nascent Republic's victory at the Battle of Castlebar which took place on 27 August 1798, General Humbert, on 31 August 1798, issued the following decree, which inter alia appointed John Moore as the President of the Government of the Province of Connacht:

Army Of Ireland

Liberty, Equality

Head quarters at Castlebar, 14th Fructidor, sixth Year of the French Republic, One and Indivisible.

General Humbert, Commander in Chief of the Army of Ireland, desirous of organising with the least possible delay, an administrative power for the Province of Connaught, decrees as follows:

1. The Government of the Province of Connaught shall reside at Castlebar till further orders.
2. The Government shall be composed of twelve members, who shall be named by the General-in-chief of the French Army.
3. Citizen JOHN MOORE is named President of the Government of the Province of Connaught, he is specially entrusted with the nomination and reunion of the members of the Government.
4. The Government shall occupy itself immediately in organising the Military power of the Province of Connaught, and with providing subsistence for the French and Irish Armies.
5. There shall be organised eight regiments of infantry, each of twelve hundred men, and four regiments of cavalry, each of six hundred men.
6. The Government shall declare rebels and traitors to the country all those who having received clothing and arms, shall not join the army within four and twenty hours.
7. Every individual from sixteen years of age to forty, inclusive, is REQUIRED in the name of the Irish Republic, to betake himself instantly to the French Camp, to march in a mass against the common enemy, the government of Ireland - the English; whose destruction alone can establish the independence and happiness of ANCIENT HIBERNIA. — General Humbert, Commanding-in-Chief

The rebel republic was a client state of the French Republic and was very short-lived. Nevertheless, among the things which President Moore did have time to do was to issue "paper money to a considerable extent...[i]n the name of the French Government". Despite their general anti-clericalism and hostility to the Bourbon monarchy, the French Directory suggested to the United Irishmen in 1798 restoring the Jacobite Pretender, Henry Benedict Stuart, as Henry IX, King of the Irish. This was on account of General Humbert landing a force in County Mayo for the Irish Rebellion of 1798 and realising the local population were devoutly Catholic (a significant number of Irish priests supported the Rising and had met with Humbert, although Humbert's Army had been veterans of the anti-clerical campaign in Italy). The French Directory hoped this option would allow the creation of a stable French client state in Ireland. However, Wolfe Tone, the Protestant republican leader, scoffed at the suggestion and it was quashed, with an Irish Republic proclaimed.

== Defeat ==
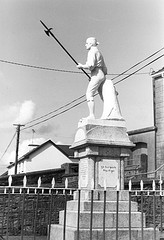
Memorial of a rebel pikeman, erected in Ballinamuck in 1928

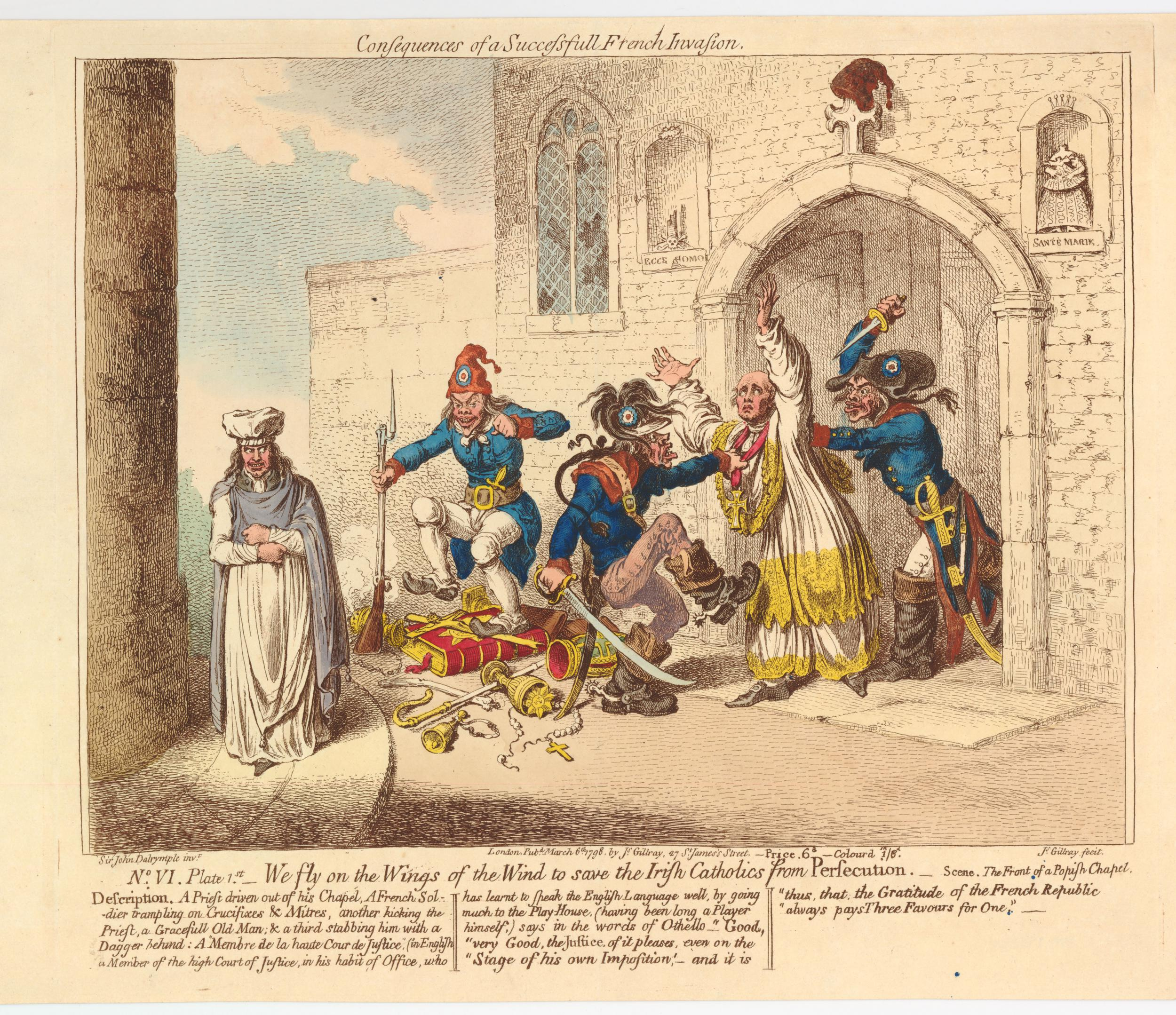
Consequences of a successful French invasion: We fly on the Wings of the Wind to save the Irish Catholics from Persecution, 1798 satirical etching by James Gillray. A French army stamp on the valuables of an Irish Catholic church, and assault a priest. The cross is covered by a Phrygian cap; statues and crucifixes vandalised.

On 8 September 1798, just weeks after its proclamation, the republic collapsed after the Battle of Ballinamuck. Moore was captured by a detachment of government troops led by Lieutenant Colonel Crawford in Castlebar, dying in custody the following year. Humbert and his men were transported by canal to Dublin and exchanged for British prisoners of war. Government forces subsequently slowly spread out into the republic, engaging in numerous skirmishes with rebel holdouts. These sweeps reached their climax on 23 September when Killala was captured by government forces. During these sweeps, suspected rebels were frequently summarily executed while many houses thought to be housing rebels were burnt. Numerous rebels took to the countryside and continued guerrilla operations, which took government forces some months to suppress.
