= Jean Joseph Amable Humbert =

French military officer (1767–1823)

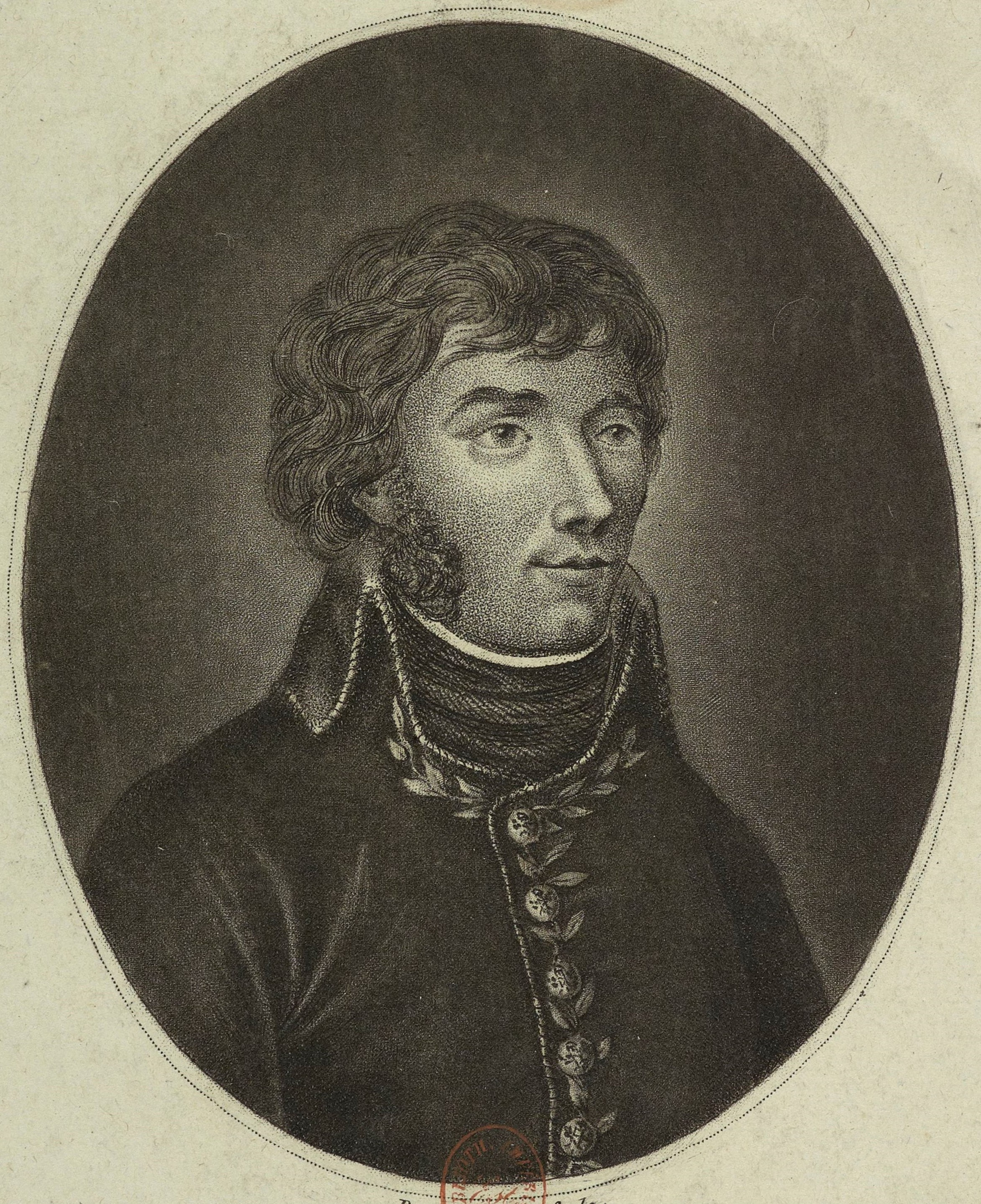
- Jean Humbert
- Military career
- Allegiance: French Revolutionary Army; Patriot governments United States Army
- Service years: 1794–1815
- Conflicts: French Revolutionary Wars; Campaigns of 1795 of the French Revolutionary Wars; action of 13 January 1797; Irish Rebellion of 1798; Battle of Castlebar; Battle of Collooney; Battle of Ballinamuck (surrendered); Italian and Swiss expedition of 1799; Second Battle of Zurich; Haitian Revolution; Saint-Domingue expedition; Argentine War of Independence; War of 1812; Battle of New Orleans

General Jean Joseph Amable Humbert (French pronunciation: [ʒɑ̃ ʒozɛf amabl ɛ̃bɛʁ]; 22 August 1767 – 3 January 1823) was a French military officer who participated in several notable military conflicts of the late 18th and early 19th century. Born in the townland of La Coâre Saint-Nabord, outside Remiremont in the Vosges department, he was a sergeant in the National Guard of Lyon. He rapidly advanced through the ranks to become brigadier general on 9 April 1794 and fought in the Western campaigns before being allocated to the Army of the Rhine. Humbert also participated in the 1798 Irish Rebellion and the War of 1812.

== Expeditions to Ireland ==
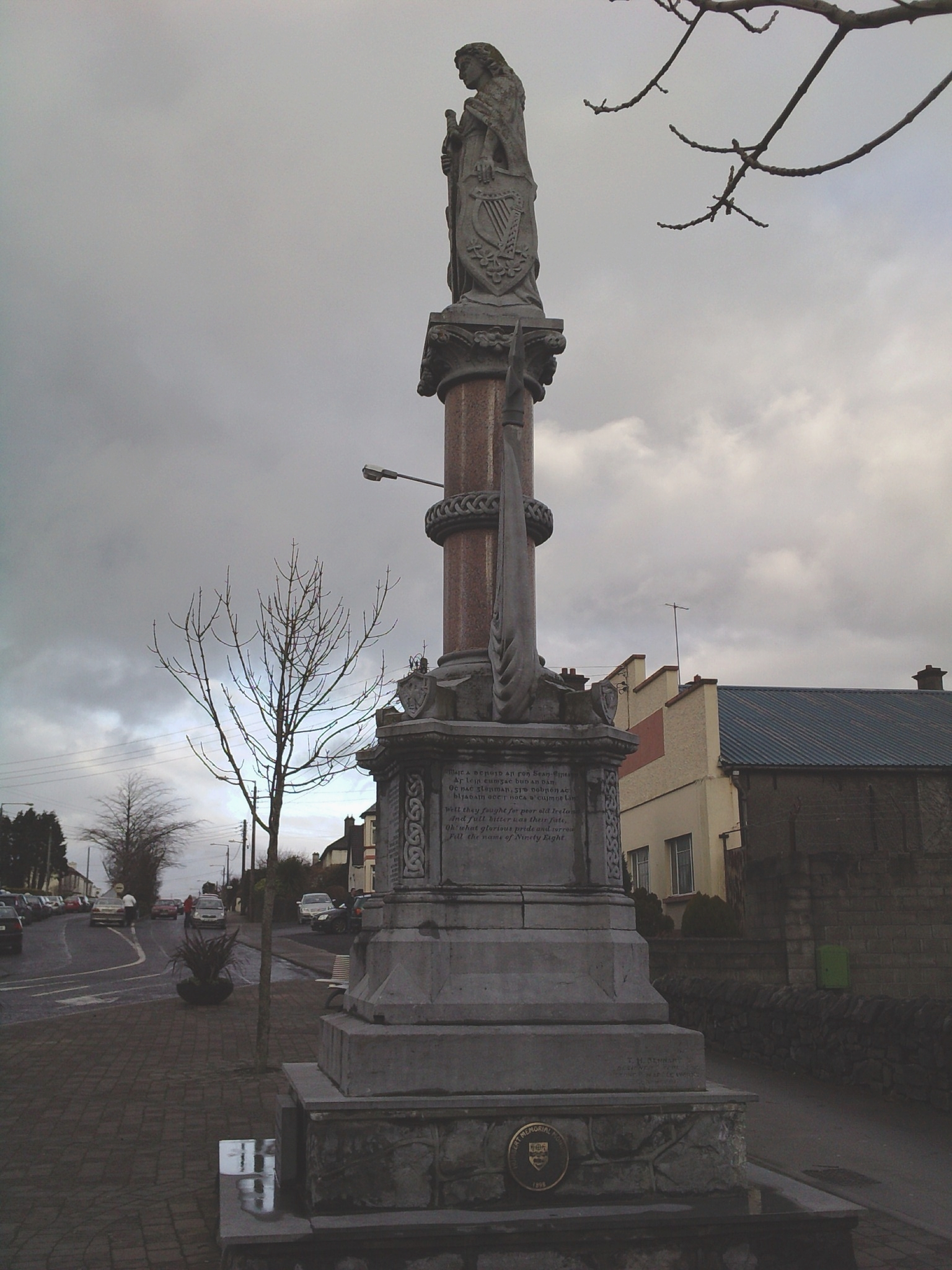
A monument to Humbert in Ballina, County Mayo

In 1794, after serving in the Army of the Coasts of Brest, Humbert served under Lazare Hoche in the Army of the Rhine and Moselle. Charged to prepare for an expedition to Ireland, he took command of the Légion Noire under Hoche, sailing in the ill-fated Expédition d'Irlande to Bantry Bay in 1796, and was engaged in actions at sea against the Royal Navy. Contrary weather and engagements with the Royal Navy forced this expedition to withdraw. The trip home resulted in the action of 13 January 1797 during which Humbert, onboard the Droits de l'Homme, narrowly escaped death. As the ship was sunk, hundreds of men perished, but Humbert was among the last to escape.

On his return to France, Humbert served in the Army of Sambre and Meuse, before being appointed to command French troops in an attempt to support the Irish Rebellion of 1798. The troops under his command consisted chiefly of infantry of the 70th demi-brigade with a few artillerymen and elements of the 3rd Hussar Regiment. By the time he arrived off the Irish coast the rebellion had already been mostly suppressed by the British. The expedition was able to land in Ireland at Killala on Thursday 23 August 1798, meeting with initial success in the Battle of Castlebar where they routed a defending force under Gerard Lake. Humbert subsequently declared the establishment of an Irish Republic, before marching on Dublin. However, Humbert's small force was defeated at the Battle of Ballinamuck by British forces and he was captured as a prisoner of war.

Depiction of Humbert (left) surrendering to Lake (centre-right) after the defeat at Ballinamuck.

Humbert and his fellow French soldiers were taken by canal to Dublin, where they were exchanged for British prisoners of war. In his first request to his captors, Humbert requested that his Irish officers receive considerate treatment, and was dismayed when several of them were ordered to be executed by Lake on the basis that they had previously been British subjects.

== Later service ==
Humbert was shortly repatriated in a prisoner exchange and appointed in succession to the armies of Mainz, the Danube and Helvetia, with which he served at the Second Battle of Zurich. He then embarked on an expedition to Saint-Domingue, which was in the midst of a slave rebellion, to restore French control over the colony and reestablish slavery. Humbert was accused of looting in Saint-Domingue by Jean Baptiste Brunet, and was also rumored to be having an affair with Pauline Bonaparte, the wife of his commanding officer Charles Leclerc. He was sent back to France by order of Leclerc in October 1802, for "prevarications, and liaison relationships with organisers of the inhabitants and with leaders of brigands". A committed republican, his displeasure at Napoleon's imperial pretensions led to him being dismissed in 1803 and he retired to Morbihan, Brittany.

In 1810, after briefly serving in the Army of the North, Humbert emigrated to New Orleans, where he established a relationship with French pirate Jean Lafitte. In 1813, Humbert joined the revolutionary Juan Bautista Mariano Picornell y Gomila in an unsuccessful attempt to foment rebellion in New Spain. In 1814, Humbert left New Orleans again to join the Patriot cause in the Argentine War of Independence, briefly commanding a corps before returning home. A year later, Humbert enlisted in the U.S. Army as a private and fought in the Battle of New Orleans while wearing his old French uniform during the War of 1812. He formed a Foreign Legion in 1815, but the war ended before they could see combat. General Andrew Jackson thanked him for his assistance there after the American victory in January 1815, and thereafter Humbert lived peacefully as a schoolteacher until his death.

== Commemoration ==
In 1989, sculptor Carmel Gallagher unveiled a bust of General Humbert in Killala, Ireland, to mark the upcoming bicentennial of the 1798 Rebellion.
