= Connolly Park =

Stadium in County Sligo, Ireland

- Páirc Ní Chonghaile
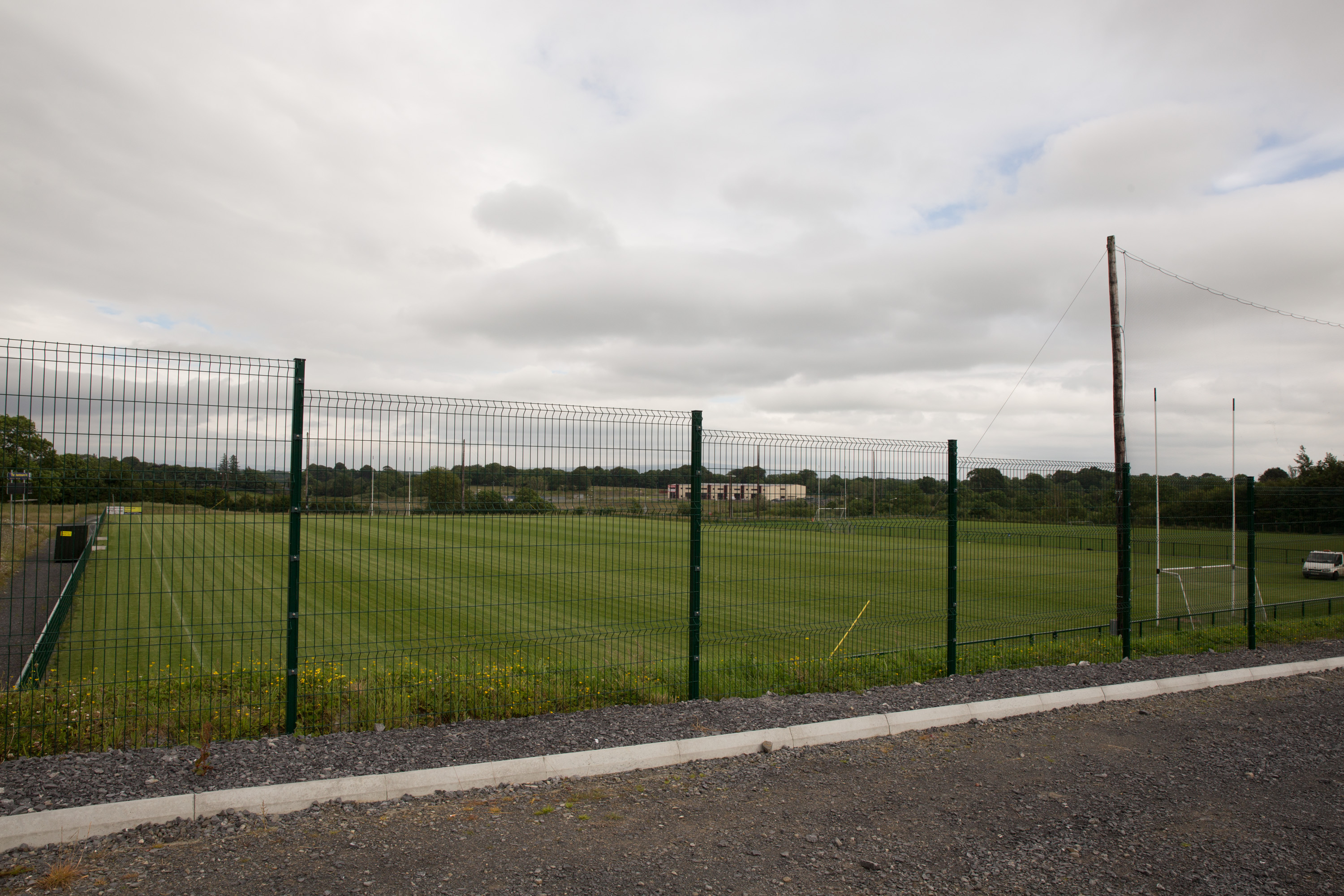

- Location within Ireland
- Location: Collooney, County Sligo, Ireland
- Coordinates: 54°10′38″N 8°29′29″W
- Owner: Owenmore Gaels GAA
- Surface: Grass
- Field size: 141 m × 80 m (154 yd × 87 yd)
- Public transit: Hawthorn Court (route 965, 1 km walk); Collooney Square (route 462, 800 m walk)

Connolly Park is a GAA stadium in Collooney, County Sligo, Ireland. It is the home ground of the Owenmore Gaels GAA club.

The Sligo county football team have contested National Football League fixtures there when their home ground Markievicz Park has been unavailable. Sligo were relegated from the league here in 2019.

The park was named in 2010 in honour of local girl Bernadette Connolly (1960–1970), victim of an unsolved murder, and her father, Gerry Connolly.

== See also ==
- List of Gaelic Athletic Association stadiums
- List of stadiums in Ireland by capacity
