= Owenmore River (County Sligo) =

River in Ireland

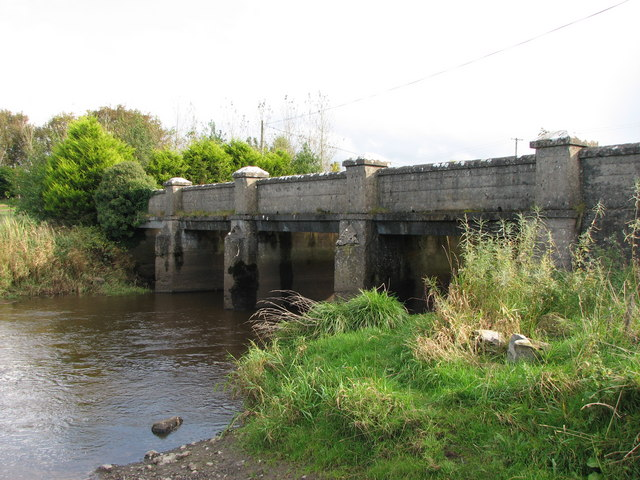
- Owenmore River crossing at Carrowreagh Bridge

Location
- Country: Ireland

Physical characteristics
- Source
  - location: near Gorteen, County Sligo
  - elevation: 125 m (410 ft)
- Mouth
  - location: Ballisodare River, near Collooney
  - coordinates: 54°11′25″N 8°29′01″W
- Length: 52.3 km (32.5 mi)
- Basin size: 655 km^{2} (253 sq mi)

The Owenmore River (Irish: An Abhainn Mhór) is a river in County Sligo, Ireland. Its source is in the far south of Sligo, near Gorteen and Lough Gara, from which it runs for 52.3 km to its juncture with the Unshin River near Collooney to form the Ballisodare River. Its catchment covers 655 square kilometres (253 sq mi), predominantly located in Sligo but with small parts in County Mayo and County Roscommon. The catchment is underlain by limestone, and the total length of all the rivers in the Greater Owenmore Basin Area is 639 kilometres (397 mi). There are approximately 1,470 hectares (5.7 sq mi) of lakes in the catchment, with Lough Arrow comprising most of this.

== Tributaries ==
- Owenbeg (23 km [14 mi])
- Unshin River (23 km [14 mi])

== Lakes in the catchment ==
- Lough Arrow (12.47 km^{2} [4.81 sq mi])
- Templehouse Lough (1.19 km^{2} [0.46 sq mi])
