= Ballisodare River =

River in County Sligo, Ireland

Coordinates: 54.190473°N 8.483756°W

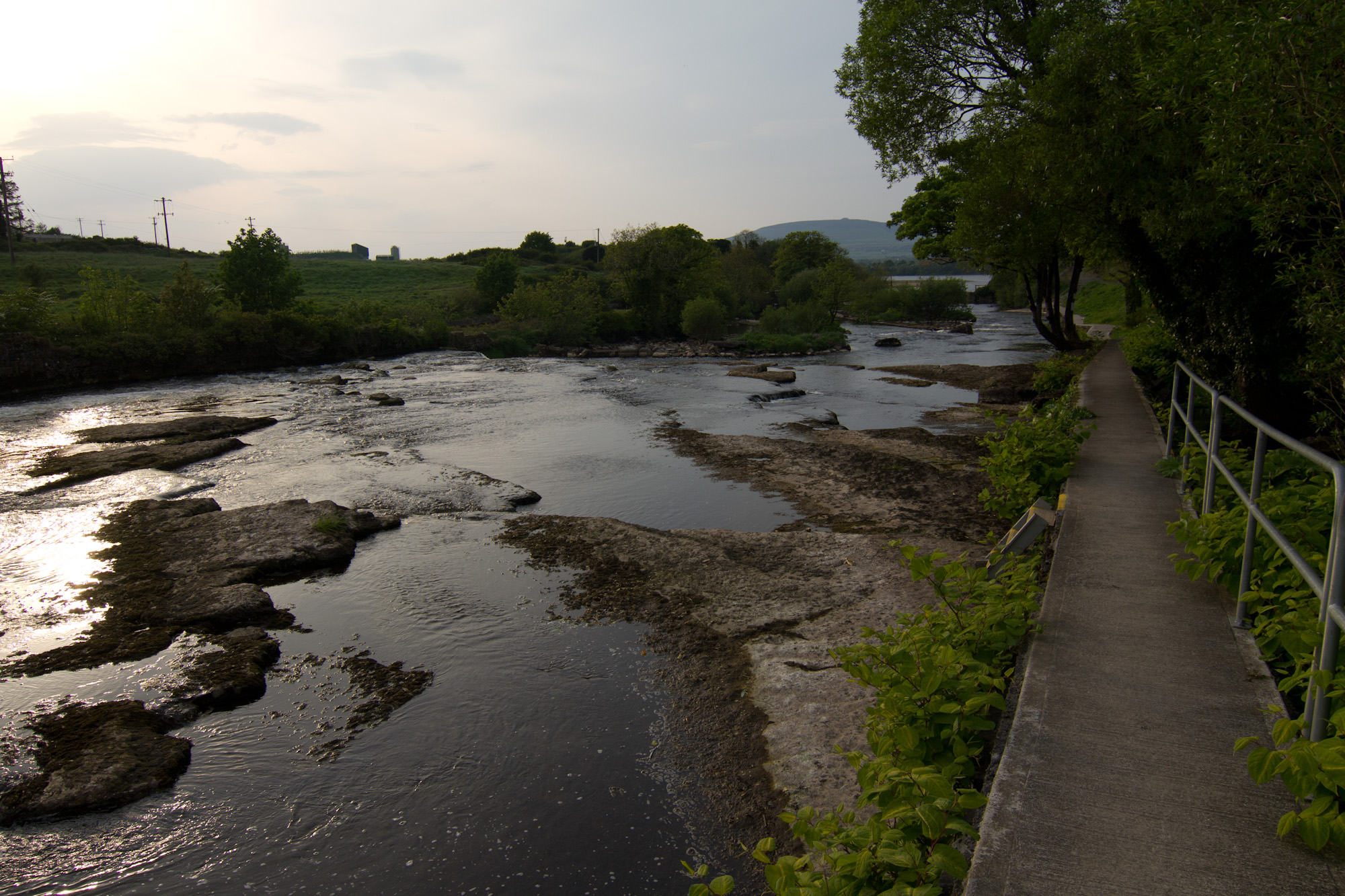
- Ballisodare River
- Native name: Abhainn Bhaile Easa Dara (Irish)

Physical characteristics
- Source
  - location: Curlew Mountains
- Mouth
  - location: Atlantic Ocean at Ballysadare
- Length: 60.8 km (37.8 mi)
- Basin size: 652.7 km^{2} (252.0 sq mi)
- Discharge
  - average: 18.25 m^{3}/s (644 cu ft/s)

The Ballisodare River (Irish: Abhainn Bhaile Easa Dara; also spelled Ballysadare) is a river in Ireland, flowing through County Sligo.

== Course ==
The Ballisodare River derives from three other Sligo rivers: the Unshin River, the Owenmore River and the Owenbeg River. It flows through Ballysadare, passing under the N4 and N59 roads.

== Wildlife ==
The Ballisodare River is a noted salmon and trout fishery, with the pools under Ballysadare Falls a favourite spot.

== See also ==
Rivers of Ireland
