= Collooney =

Town in County Sligo, Ireland

Collooney Cúil Mhuine
- Town
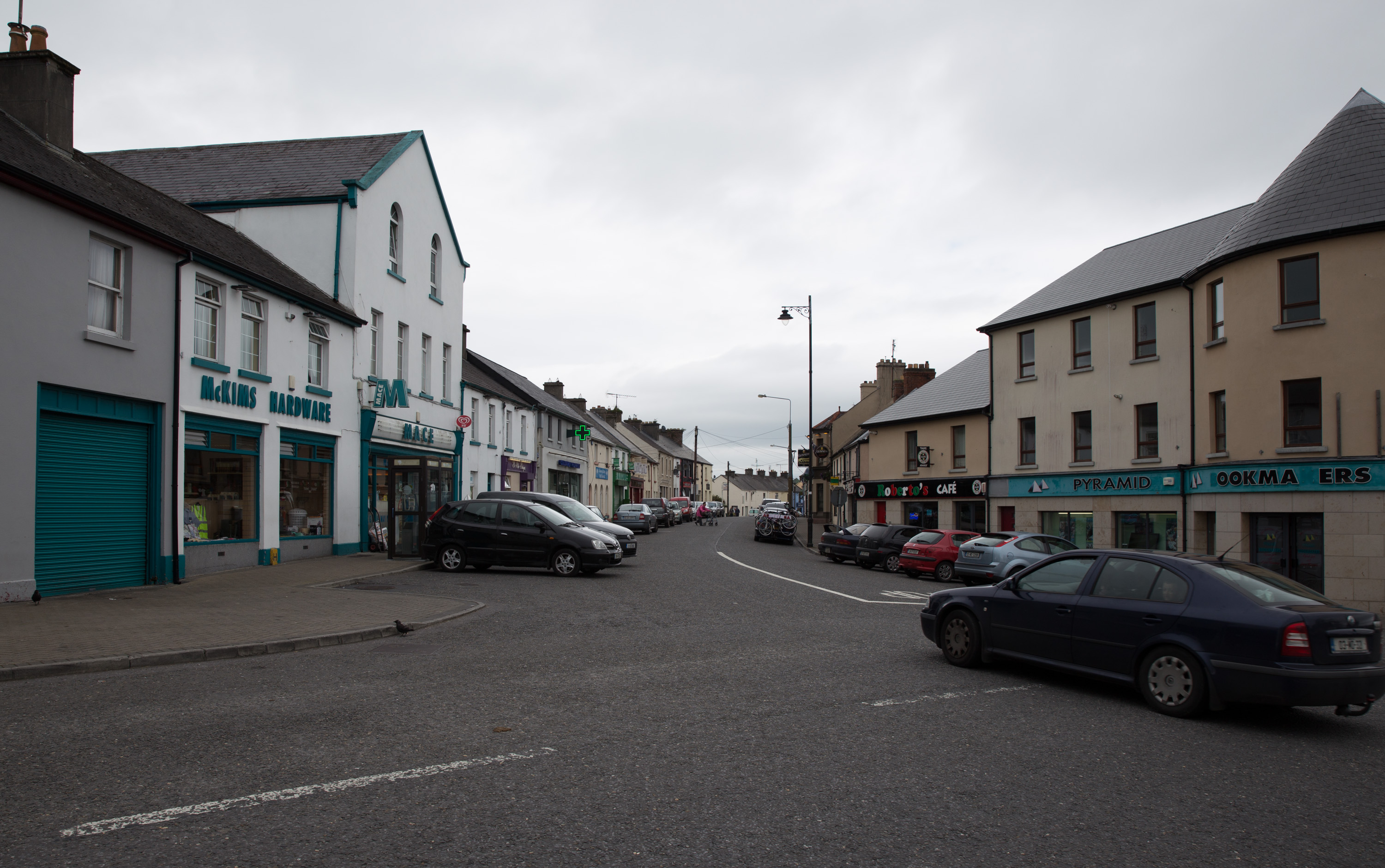
- Main Street

- Location in Ireland
- Coordinates: 54°10′59″N 8°29′31″W
- Country: Ireland
- Province: Connacht
- County: County Sligo
- Elevation: 62 m (203 ft)

Population (2022)
  - Total: 1,797
- Time zone: UTC±0 (WET)
  - Summer (DST): UTC+1 (IST)
- Eircode routing key: F91
- Telephone area code: +353(0)71
- Irish Grid Reference: G674261

Collooney or Coloony (Irish: Cúil Mhuine, meaning 'nook of the thicket') is a town in County Sligo, Ireland. It is in a townland of the same name.

== Toponymy ==
Collooney is thought to derive from Irish: Cúil Mhuine, meaning 'nook of the thicket'. Reverend Terrence O'Rorke has previously also suggested Culmaine, as Collooney is designated this way in such works as the Annals of the Four Masters, Dudley M'Firlis, and O'Flaherty's "Chorographical description of West Connaught"; he further suggests "Angle of the Whirlpool" from the confluence of the Uncion and Owenmore as the most likely origin of the name. The settlement was also at times previously termed Cashel, Killinbridge or even Cowlowney.

== History ==
During the Irish Rebellion of 1798, a battle took place outside the town in which a combined French and Irish force defeated British troops from the Sligo garrison. Known as the Battle of Collooney (or Battle of Carricknagat), this conflict is commemorated by the Teeling Monument outside the town – named for a member of the United Irishmen who was involved in the battle.

In the 18th century, a bleach mill was built locally by Charles O'Hara in an effort to increase industry in the Sligo area. O'Hara brought in weavers and bleachers from the north to settle in the Collooney area. The mill finally closed in 1956. The mill was also used at certain times in its history for the production of carbide, a mixture of coal, coke and lime.

== Geography ==
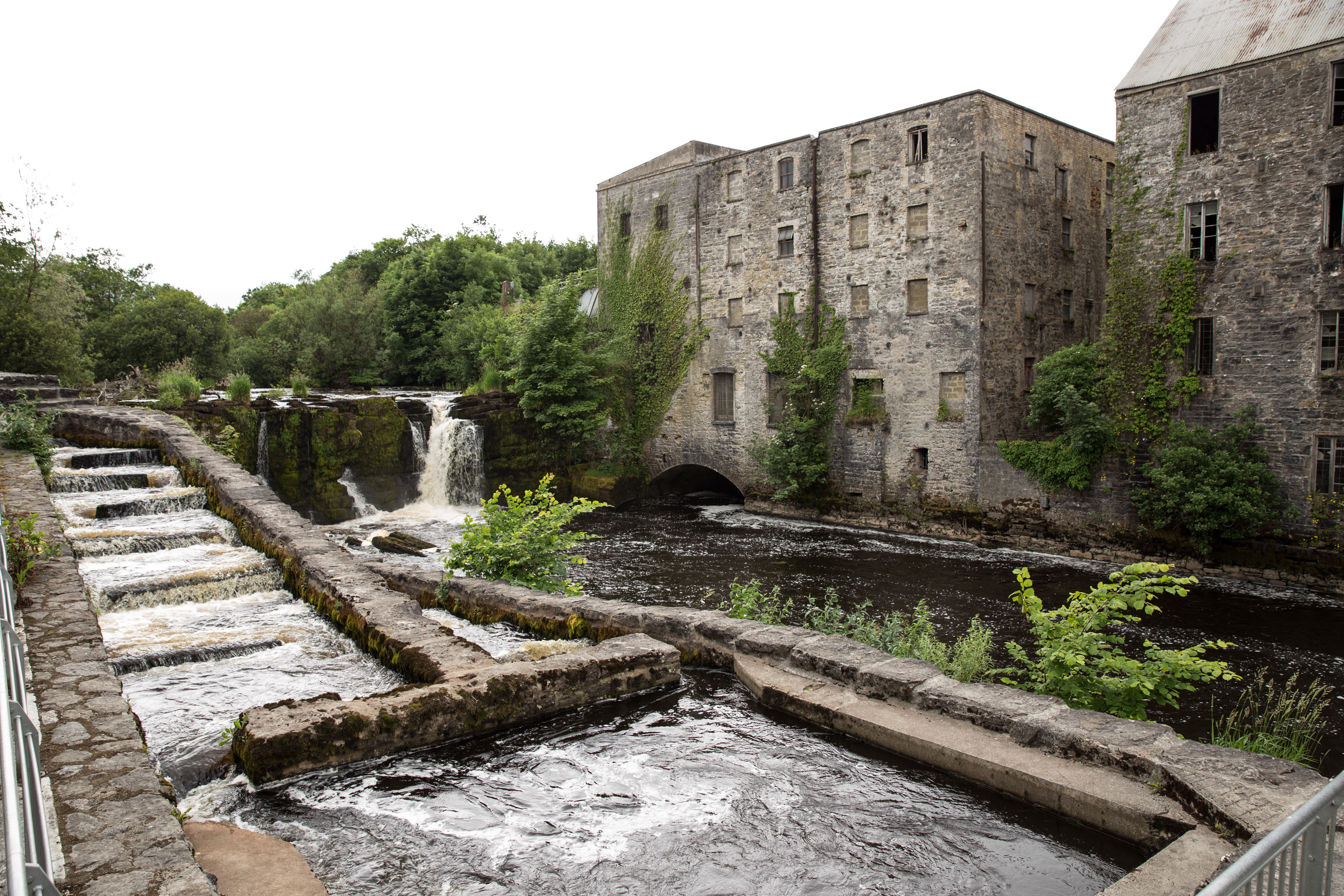
Old Mill building

The main part of the town lies to south west of the Owenmore River which joins the Unshin River just to the north of the town to form the Ballysadare River.

== Transport ==
Collooney is located just off the N4 (Dublin to Sligo) and N17 (Sligo to Galway) roads, having been bypassed twice, by the N4 in 1998, and the N17 in 1992, and is the meeting point of both roads.

The town was a significant railway centre, with no fewer than three railway stations. In addition to the one remaining Collooney railway station, opened on 3 December 1862 (on the Dublin–Sligo line), there was a station on the line to Claremorris (the Western Railway Corridor) and on the Sligo, Leitrim and Northern Counties Railway line to Enniskillen.

== See also ==
- Connolly Park
- List of towns in the Republic of Ireland
