= Killala =

Village in County Mayo, Ireland

Killala Irish: Cill Ala
- Village
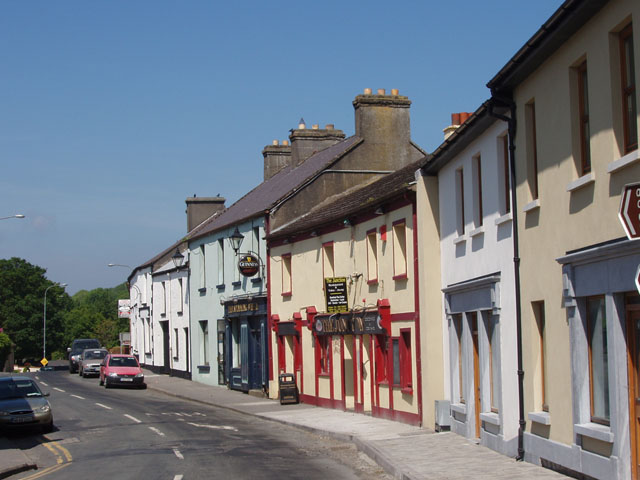
- Shops on the Ballycastle Road in Killala

- Location in Ireland
- Coordinates: 54°12′45″N 09°13′17″W
- Country: Ireland
- Province: Connacht
- County: County Mayo

Population (2016)
  - Total: 562
- Time zone: UTC+0 (WET)
  - Summer (DST): UTC-1 (IST (WEST))
- Irish Grid Reference: G206286

Killala (Irish: Cill Ala, meaning 'the mottled church') is a village in County Mayo in Ireland, north of Ballina. The railway line from Dublin to Ballina once extended to Killala. To the west of Killala is the townland of Townsplots West (known locally as Enagh Beg), which contains a number of ancient forts. Historically associated with Saint Patrick, and the seat of an episcopal see for several centuries, evidence of Killala's ecclesiastical past include a 12th-century round tower and the 17th century Cathedral Church of St Patrick. As of the 2016 census of Ireland, the village had a population of 562. The village is in a civil parish of the same name.

== History ==
=== Ecclesiastical history ===
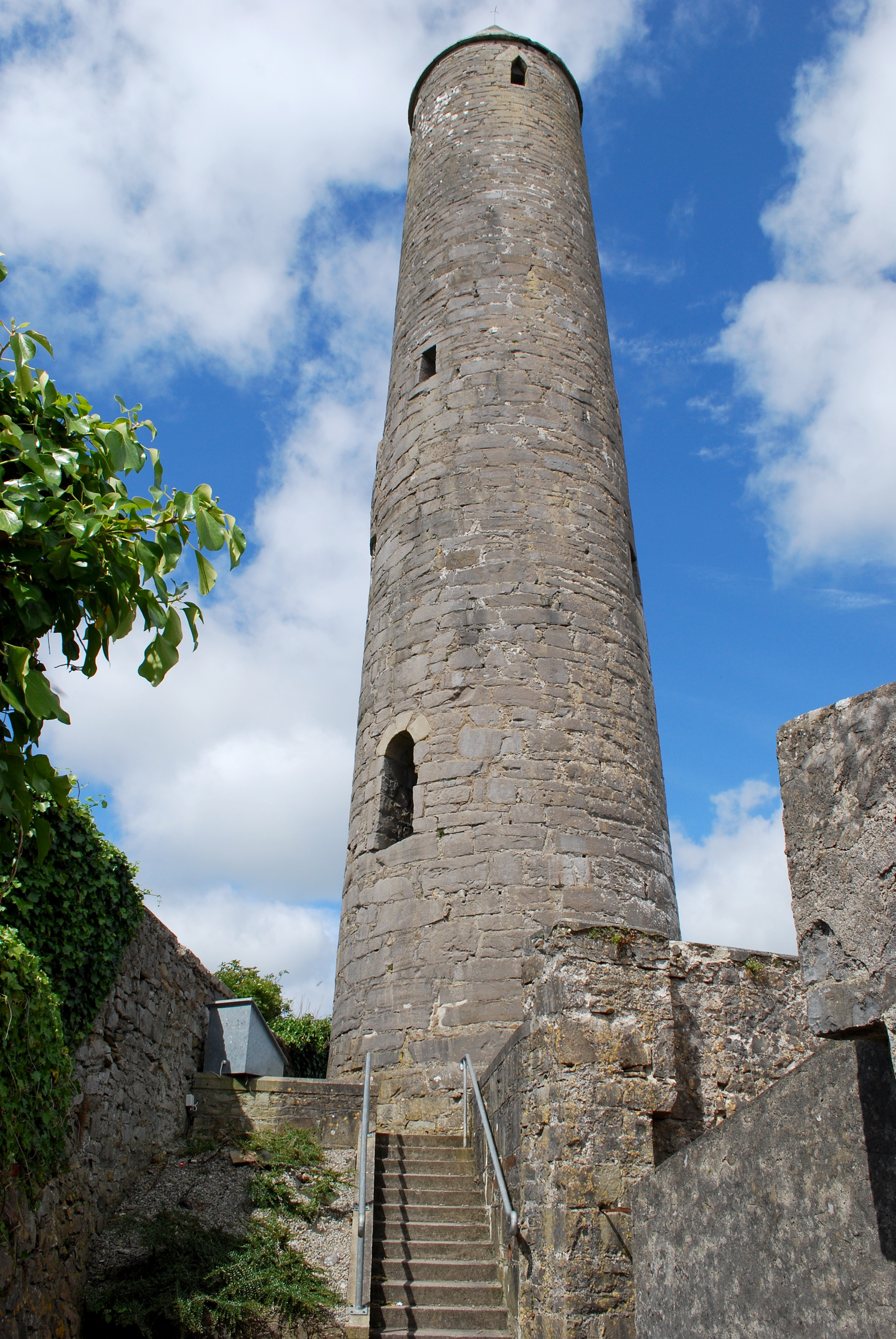
Killala Round Tower

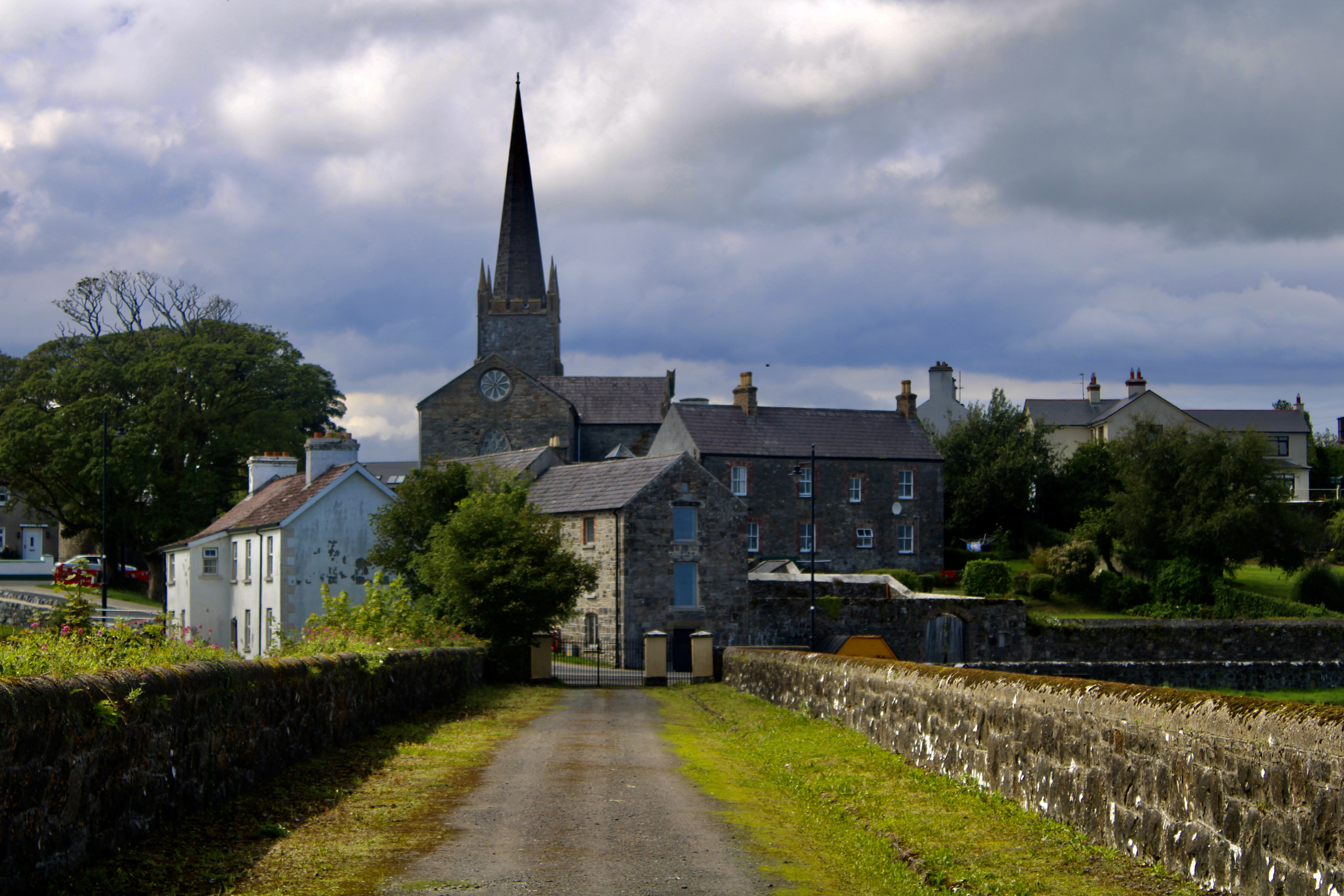
Killala town

The Roman Catholic Diocese of Killala (Alladenis in Latin) is one of the five suffragan sees of the ecclesiastical Province of Tuam, comprising the north-western part of County Mayo with the Barony of Tireragh in County Sligo. In all there are 22 parishes, some of which, bordering on the Atlantic Ocean, consist mostly of wild moorland, sparsely inhabited. Lewis's Topographical Dictionary sets down the length of the diocese as 45 miles (72 km), the breadth 21 miles (34 km), and the estimated superficies as 314,300 acres (1,272 km^{2}) – of which 43,100 acres (174 km^{2}) are in County Sligo and 271,200 acres (1,098 km^{2}) in County Mayo.

The foundation of the diocese dates from the time of Saint Patrick, who placed his disciple St. Muredach over the church called in Irish Cell Alaid. In a well that still flows close to the town, local suggests that Patrick baptized 12,000 converts on a single day. Muredach is described as an old man of Patrick's family, and was appointed to the Church of Killala as early as 442 or 443. It is possible that he resigned his see after a few years, and retired to end his life on an island in Donegal Bay, which now bears his name, Inishmurray. At Killala, Patrick reputedly also baptized the two maidens whom he met in childhood at Focluth Wood by the western sea, and whose voices in visions of the night had apparently called to him. He came, baptized them and built them a church where they spent the rest of their days as nuns.

Little is known of the successors of Muredach in Killala down to the 12th century. According to an entry in the Catholic Encyclopedia, the "people of Killala recall that John MacHale, Archbishop of Tuam, was a child of their diocese". He became Coadjutor Bishop of Killala in 1825, bishop in 1834, and later in the same year was transferred to Tuam. He died in 1881. After him came Francis Joseph O'Finan, a Dominican priest. On his resignation in 1838, a parish priest of the Archdiocese of Tuam, Thomas Feeney, who had formerly been professor and president of St. Jarlath's College at Tuam, was chosen for the post.

Along the left bank of the river are the ruins of several monasteries. Rosserk, a Franciscan house of strict observance, was founded in 1460. The Abbey of Moyne still stands on a site just over the river, and further on, north of Killala, was the Dominican Rathfran Friary. On the promontory of Errew running into Lough Conn stood another monastery. A round tower in Killala itself is still standing.

=== 18th century ===
By the end of the 18th century, Killala had established a small sea port, where fishing was the primary activity. The town also produced coarse linens and woollen products.

=== French invasion ===
Killala was the site of the first engagement, during the Irish Rebellion of 1798, to involve the French force of General Jean Joseph Amable Humbert. On 22 August 1798, Humbert landed at nearby Kilcummin harbour, with 1,109 French troops, with the objective of supporting the rebellion. Humbert's force seized Killala and advanced to Ballina, which was also captured with little trouble. The force then moved further inland and, on 27 August, it won the Battle of Castlebar against a larger government force commanded by General Gerard Lake.

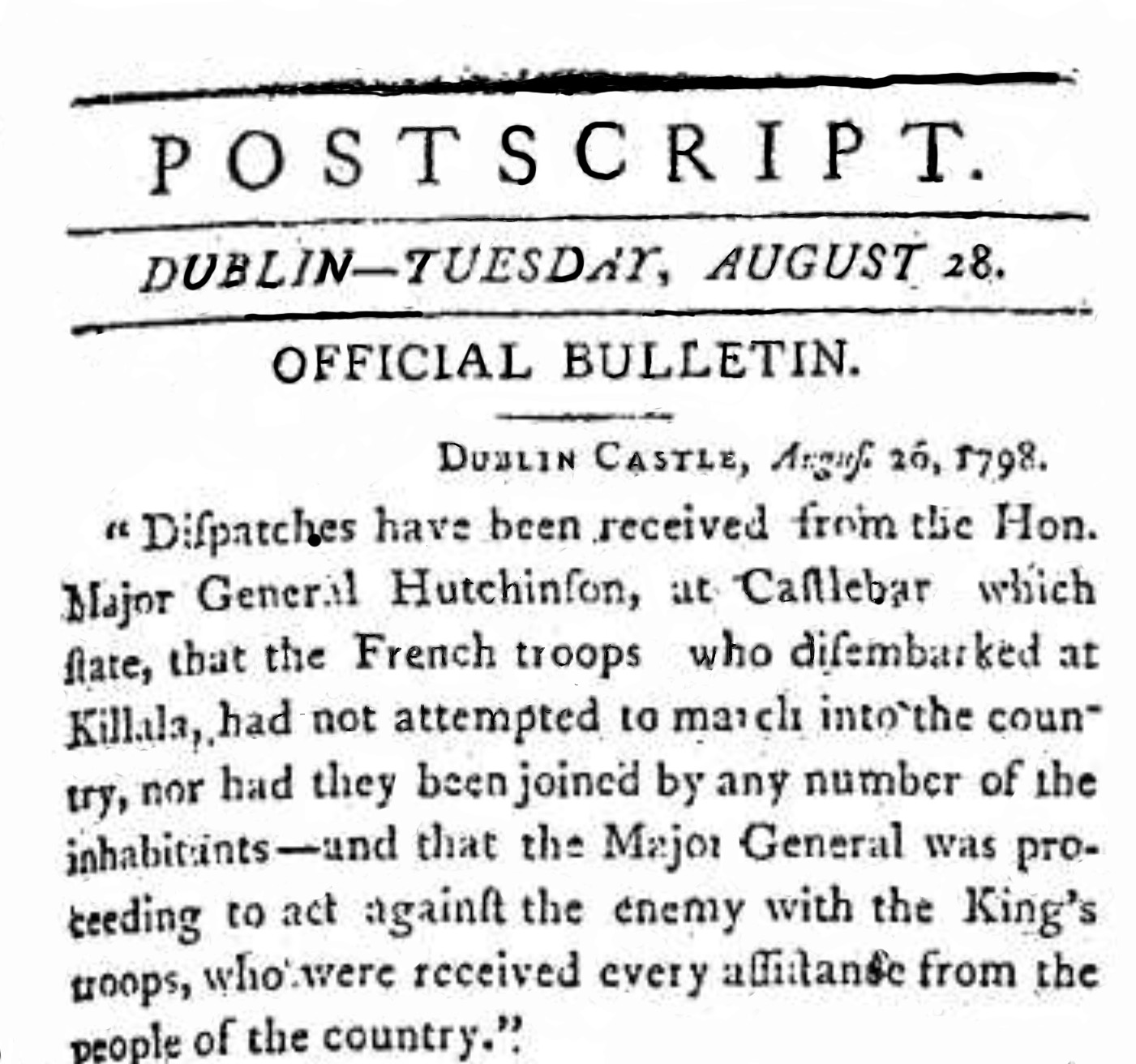
Account of the French movements after the landing in Killala

The defeat of the government forces at Castlebar caused a panic in Dublin, and the British government sent reinforcements to Ireland. Humbert and his Irish allies were eventually defeated at the Battle of Ballinamuck in Longford. On 23 September, a government force led by Major-General Eyre Power Trench attacked Killala and ejected the remnants of Humbert's invasion force who were still in the town. The defeat was the last land major engagement of the 1798 rebellion. Killala had remained under rebel control for thirty-two days.

== Transport ==
=== Harbour ===
Killala has a harbour at the south end of Killala Bay.

=== Road ===
The R314 road connects Killala south to Ballina (and the N26 and N59 roads) and north to Ballycastle.

Bus Éireann route 445 serves Killala a few times a day on weekdays with service to Ballina and Ballycastle.

=== Railway ===
The line from Ballina to Killala opened on 2 January 1893. It took two years and £29,000 to complete the line, carrying both passengers and freight, the line had a total of five gatehouses, one tunnel and four bridges. At Killala station there was a turntable, two sidings, a signal cabin and a stationmaster's house that is now privately owned. The line proved to be unprofitable and was discontinued for passengers on 1 October 1931 and finally for goods on 1 July 1934.

== Industry ==
Asahi manufactured acrylic fibre from acrylonitrile which was transported to Ballina railway station by rail from Dublin Port. The former Midland Great Western Railway line to Killala had been dismantled and built over prior to the factory's establishment south of the village in the 1970s so the remainder of the journey was completed by road. This facility closed in 1997. A proposal to handle asbestos waste at the Asahi site was withdrawn in 2005 due to strong local opposition.

As of 2011, a 50 MW combined heat and power plant using biomass fuel was planned for the former Asahi site. A nearby 20 MW wind farm has a 10 MW battery.

A transatlantic communications cable was expected to come ashore at Killala in 2013 en route to Northern Ireland as part of "Project Kelvin".

== Places of interest ==
Killala's round tower is the last remaining medieval structure of a monastic establishment, thought to have been built in the 12th century. The monastery is traditionally said to have been founded here by Saint Patrick, who appointed St. Muiredach as the first bishop of Killala. The tower stands 52 metres (170 feet) high, and it is composed of limestone.

The Cathedral Church of St. Patrick, built in the 1670s, is one of two cathedral churches belonging to the Church of Ireland's Diocese of Tuam, Limerick and Killaloe.

== Culture ==
Killala was used as a location for the 1981 television series The Year of the French which was based on the novel by Thomas Flanagan.

In 1989, sculptor Carmel Gallagher unveiled a bust of General Humbert in the area to mark the then upcoming bicentennial of the 1798 Rebellion. In 1998, Killala celebrated the bicentenary of this event by twinning with the commune of Chauvé in France.

== People ==
- Aileen Gilroy, Gaelic footballer, association footballer, Australian rules footballer
- Patrick McHale, recipient of the Victoria Cross
- James Wills (1899-1949), first-class cricketer

== Twin towns ==
- Chauvé, France - since 1998
