= Hervey Montmorency Morres =

Irish nationalist

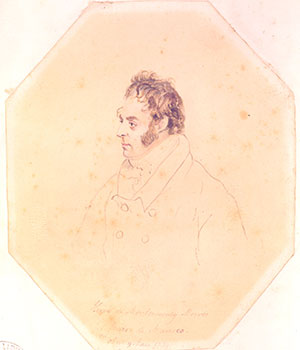
- Born: 7 March 1767; Rathailean Castle, County Tipperary
- Died: 9 May 1839 (aged 72); St. Germain-en-Laye, France
- Occupation: Nationalist

Hervey Montmorency Morres (7 March 1767 – 9 May 1839) was an Irish nationalist.

== Biography ==
Morres was the eldest son of Matthew Montmorency Morres and Margaret, second daughter of Francis Magan of Emo, co. Westmeath. He was born at Rathailean Castle, County Tipperary, on 7 March 1767. At the age of fifteen he entered the Austrian service. He served as ensign under Field-marshal Lacy against the Turks, distinguishing himself at the siege of Belgrade in 1789, and was transferred with the rank of lieutenant into Count Kavanagh's regiment of cuirassiers. He subsequently served as a volunteer in the army of Prince Hohenlohe against the French republic, and commanded a company of skirmishers at the siege of Thionville. He fought with distinction in the army of the Rhine under Marshal Wurmser in 1793, and was afterwards aide-de-camp to Prince Charles of Fiirstemberg. He quitted the Austrian service in 1795, and, having in September of that year married Louise de Helmstadt at Heidelberg, he returned to Ireland and took up his residence at Knockalton in co. Tipperary. Shortly after his arrival he addressed a memorial to the lord-lieutenant, the Earl of Camden, on the disturbed state of Ireland, advocating the formation of a strong military force, composed impartially of Catholics and Protestants. He was thanked for his suggestions, but informed that they were impracticable.

On the rumour of Hoche's expedition in 1796 he accepted a commission as aide-de-camp to General Dundas; but, becoming disgusted at the violent measures of government, he became in November of that year a United Irishman. He was chosen a county representative for Tipperary in May 1797, and nominated colonel of the regiment of Nenagh infantry. In February 1798 he was attached to the general military committee, and soon after appointed adjutant-general of Munster. He was very active in forwarding the organisation of his province, and, subsequent to the arrest of the Leinster Directory on 12 March, he was made a member of the new executive. He avoided an attempt that was made to arrest him on 28 April, and having been assigned the capture of the batteries and magazines in the Phoenix Park, he was busily engaged in working out his plans when the whole scheme of the insurrection was frustrated by the capture of Lord Edward Fitzgerald. Morres managed to escape from Dublin on 4 June, and lay concealed in co. Westmeath till the arrival of Jean Joseph Amable Humbert's expedition on 22 August. Thinking that Humbert would not immediately risk a decisive engagement, he endeavoured to restrain the ardour of the men of Westmeath; but after the passage of the Shannon, 'taking part in the right flank of Lord Cornwallis's army, with a body of from two to three thousand ill-armed peasants and several chiefs of the union, he made such dispositions as he judged might prove most favourable to the progress of the invading army' (Castlereagh Corresp. ii. 95).

After the capitulation of the French army at Ballinamuck he escaped to Dublin, and thence through England to Hamburg, where he arrived on 7 October. He was cordially welcomed, as an old friend of her husband, by Lady Fitzgerald; but, having been included by name in the Rebel Fugitives Act, he did not feel secure in Hamburg, and applied to the French resident, Marragon, for permission to proceed to France. His apprehensions were not unfounded. His secret correspondence with the French minister was revealed to the English cabinet by Samuel Turner and on 24 November he was arrested, at the instance of the British agent, Sir James Crawford, at the American Arms, together with James Napper Tandy, William Corbet, and James Bartholomew Blackwell. This act was contrary to the law of nations and despite the protests of Marragon. After ten months' close confinement the senate of Hamburg consented to his extradition, and at midnight on 28 September 1799 he was, with his three companions, conveyed on board an English frigate at Cuxhaven. The subserviency of the senate of Hamburg caused universal indignation, and drew down upon them Napoleon's wrath, which was only appeased by the payment of a fine of four millions and a half francs and a public apology. The arrival of Morres and his companions in England caused considerable excitement, but they were shortly afterwards removed for trial to Ireland. The prosecution against Morres and Tandy broke down on a point of law. Morres pleaded that he had been arrested eight days before the time assigned by the act for his voluntary surrender had expired, and, after a long argument, his objection was sustained by Lord Kilwarden. But it was not till 10 December 1801, after more than three years' imprisonment, that he was released on bail. His wife having died at the age of twenty-six, on the very day of his arrest at Hamburg, Morres, after a brief visit to Paris, married, at Dublin, Helen, widow of Dr. John Esmonde, hanged as a traitor in 1798, and daughter of Bartholomew O'Neill-Callan of Osbertstown House, co. Kildare.

He continued to reside in Ireland for several years, but about 1811 he was persuaded by the French minister of war, Henri Jacques Guillaume Clarke, himself of Irish descent, to enter the French service. On 19 May 1812 he was appointed adjutant-commandant with the rank of colonel, made a member of the Legion of Honour, and placed on the staff of General Augereau at Lyons. Some futile efforts were made by his family to induce him to return to Ireland, and his offer, after the abdication of Napoleon, to serve under the English flag not meeting with a cordial response from Wellington and Castlereagh, he retained his commission in the French army, and on 3 November 1816 he obtained letters of naturalisation. At the restoration of the monarchy he entered into communication with the head of the family of Montmorency in France with a view to his recognition as a descendant of the Irish branch of the same house. His overtures were not favourably received, and in justification of his claim he compiled an exhaustive genealogical memoir of the family of Montmorency; but, though absolutely conclusive on the point, it failed to remove the objections of the Duc de Montmorency. He continued to reside in Paris, occupied chiefly in literary researches, receiving the half-pay of a staff-colonel till his death, which took place at St. Germain-en-Laye on 9 May 1839. According to Miles Byrne, who knew him personally, 'he was brave and honourable, and much liked by his countrymen in France.' He left children by both his wives. His eldest daughter, Louise, born at Knockalton on 20 September 1795, was for a time maid of honour to Queen Caroline of Bavaria. Three of his sons, Herve, Geoffroy, and Mathieu, became officers in the Austrian service. He was much interested in Irish topography, and was regarded as an authority on the subject.

He published:

- 'Nomenclatura Hibernica,' Dublin, 1810.
- 'Reflections on the Veto.'
- 'A Historical Inquiry into the Origin and Primitive Use of the Irish Pillar Tower,' London, 1821.
- 'A Genealogical Memoir of the Family of Montmorency, styled De Marisco or Morres,' Paris, 1817.
- 'Les Montmorency de France et les Montmorency d'Irlande,' Paris, 1825.

He assisted in a new edition of Archdall's 'Monasticum Hibernicum,' and in a 'Topographical Dictionary of Ireland,' neither of which apparently was published; and contributed much valuable information to Brewer's 'Beauties of Ireland.'
