= James Coigly =

Irish Roman Catholic priest

Father James Coigly
- Born: 1761; Kilmore, County Armagh, Kingdom of Ireland
- Died: 6 June 1798 (aged 36–37); Maidstone, Kent, Kingdom of Great Britain
- Cause of death: Executed for High Treason
- Education: Dundalk Grammar School, Collège des Lombards, Paris
- Occupation: Roman Catholic Priest
- Notable work: The Life of the Rev. James Coigly, and Address to the People of Ireland (1798),
- Movement: Society of United Irishmen

Father James Coigly (aka James O'Coigley and James/Jeremiah Quigley) (1761 – 7 June 1798) was a Roman Catholic priest in Ireland active in the republican movement against the British Crown and the kingdom's Protestant Ascendancy. He served the Society of United Irishmen as a mediator in the sectarian Armagh Disturbances and as an envoy both to the government of the French Republic and to radical circles in England with whom he sought to coordinate an insurrection. In June 1798 he was executed in England for treason having been detained as he was about to embark on a return mission to Paris.

== Education: Dundalk and Paris ==
The second son of Louisa (née Donnelly) and James Coigly, Coigly was born in 1761 into a small farming/weaving family in Kilmore, County Armagh in the Kingdom of Ireland. He was proud of his ancestry, having had great grandfathers who had fought and died in the Jacobite cause at Derry and the Boyne.

During his formative years the Penal Laws, which had systematically excluded Ireland's Roman Catholic majority from land ownership, the professions and public office, were by stages relaxed. Catholic families of at least middling income could aspire to educate their sons. Coigly was sent to Dundalk Grammar School for classical studies. Despite this being a Protestant school he acquired a religious vocation.

After Dundalk Coigly entered the priesthood in the archdiocese of Armagh. In January 1785 he was ordained by the Coadjutor Bishop of Armagh Richard O'Reilly. In the absence of a seminary in Ireland, he was sent for further studies to the Collège des Lombards (the Irish College) in Paris where Irish students, bound for careers not only in the Church but also in law, medicine, or in service with the Irish Brigade in the French army were taught.

Coigly has been described as "no friend of the [French] revolution". He stayed in Paris until 12 October 1789, by which time Louis XVI had been brought back from Versailles by the women of Paris and clerical members had been hounded from National Assembly. By his own account Coigly, himself, narrowly escaped "lanternisation" (being hung from a street lantern) by a mob who took his clerical garb as a token of royalist sympathies. But relayed while on trial for his life in 1798, his story of escaping revolutionary justice may be no more reliable that his general protestations of political innocence. According to William MacNeven, only the year before, Coigly had been exciting "almost extravagant" joy among "the Coventanters" of Antrim and Down by proclaiming that "this Romish priest is so sincere a lover of liberty, as to have been actually fighting at the capture of the Bastille" (something which, if true, would have placed Coigly in the company of his fellow collegiate James Bartholomew Blackwell).

At the College in Paris, Coigly had already demonstrated what the historian of the diocese of Down and Conor recorded as the "systematic insubordination" that was the "forerunner of his sad and subsequent career, which terminated on the scaffold". Coigly took the unprecedented step of initiating legal proceedings against the college to secure a scholarship, and then followed this up with an appeal to restore to students the right to elect their superiors.

In Paris, Coigly would have been familiar with the work of the Irish theologian Luke Joseph Hooke. "A representative of the Catholicism of the Enlightenment", Hooke argued that the laws of civil society should be so designed that men can conform to the natural rights ordained by God of their own free will. The just state and the true religion were one and the same.

== "Uniting business" in Armagh ==
In Ireland the French Revolution had revived the Volunteer movement in Presbyterian Belfast and its hinterlands and emboldened the Catholic Committee in Dublin. As the government made clear the limits for potential reform, more radical elements in the two centres formed themselves as the United Irishmen. Drawing on the growing discontents of tenant farmers, market-town traders, journeymen and weavers, United Irish "societies" multiplied rapidly across Ulster and the Irish midlands.

In 1791 Coigly returned to the Armagh diocese (where he held a curacy in Dundalk, 1793–6) to find "the inhabitants of ... County Armagh engaged in a civil war, and religion made the pretext".—the Armagh disturbances. Armagh had been the premier volunteering county in Ireland, but in contrast to Belfast and the surrounding Presbyterian-majority districts of counties Down and Antrim, it was a sectarian borderland with comparatively large English-descendant Established Church population and was experiencing a particularly acute competition for tenancies and employment. Lord Charlemont Volunteers refused to admit Catholics, and collaborated with the Peep o' Day Boys who, on the pretext of searching for illegally held arms, invaded and destroyed Catholic homes. Coigly's family home, itself, was ransacked and his father was pressed at gunpoint to recant his religion. In celebrations following the defeat of Catholic "Defenders" in the Battle of the Diamond, the combination of local vigilantism and gentry patronage led to the formation in 1795 of the Orange Order.

Pursuing a "union of power among Irishmen of every religious persuasion", the United Irish societies reached out to the Defenders. They were able to offer practical assistance: legal counsel, aid and refuge. Displaced families were sheltered on Presbyterian farms in Down and in Antrim (where between 1791 and '93, Coigly also recalls in his memoir having been active in combatting "deep-rooted prejudice"), and the goodwill earned was used to open the Defenders to trusted republicans. There was "little doubt" that Coigly's efforts to protect, and seek out support for, his parishioners "merged into the 'uniting business’ of Theobald Wolfe Tone, Samuel Neilson, and John Keogh" in the neighbouring centres of sectarian conflict in south Down. The first biographer of the United Irishmen, R.R. Madden, believes that it was Coigly who introduced the Defenders of County Louth to the Dublin United Irish leader Napper Tandy.

By January 1797 Coigly is said to have been a member of the United Irishmen's Ulster Council, having been sworn into the movement at the house of Valentine Lawless in Dublin. His profile within the United Irish movement increased following a series of arrests in the Autumn of 1796, including of Charles Teeling who had been securing command over the Down, Antrim and Armagh Defenders, and by his association with Lord Edward Fitzgerald and others impatient with the incumbent leadership. In February 1797, the informer Leonard MacNally reported on Coigly’s "political mission at Dundalk and Armagh’"; he had met with Richard McCormick (United Irishman and Catholic Committee activist) and other leading radicals, and had also made visits to the state prisoners at Kilmainham.

Coigly played a leading role in what proved to be the United Irishmen's last test of constitutional means: campaigns to return Lord Edward Fitzgerald from Down and Arthur O’Connor from Antrim in the 1797 parliamentary elections. Coigly made himself "as active as possible" and is suspected of having been the author of the campaign pamphlet, A view of the present state of Ireland (sometimes attributed to Arthur O'Connor). Jemmy Hope declared that it "contained more truth than all the volumes I have seen written on the events of 1797 and 1798".

== Isolation in the Church ==
In Ulster, where the Catholic Church was "almost totally united in its condemnation of disaffection", Coigly is thought to have been one of only half a dozen priests, out of seventy in the province, active in the republican movement, and by far the most prominent.

In advance of the proscription of United Irish societies in 1794, Thomas Troy, Catholic Archbishop of Dublin and Papal legate, had cautioned against the "fascinating illusions" of French principles and had threaten any Catholic taking the United test with excommunication. The Defenders were already condemned, by Primate, Archbishop of Armagh, Richard O'Reilly in 1788.

After his return from France in late 1789, it is believed that Coigly ministered for three years in Dundalk. It is likely that the magistrates wielded enough power and influence with his church superiors to ensure that, as a known associate of Defenders and United Irishmen, he was not thereafter employed for parish duties. When in Paris in 1797, an old friend from the Collège des Lombards helped secure him a post as Chaplain. But Coigly would not take the oath to the Civic Constitution of the Clergy, a requirement in the French Republic that, in the eyes of the Roman Curia, would have rendered him a schismatic. He walked the streets of Paris, not in clerical garb, but in a military tunic.

== Envoy to England and France ==
In his Life, Coigly attributed his decision to leave Ireland in June 1797 to the persecution of his enemies. There was a warrant for his arrest. But divisions sharpened by the failure of the French under General Lazare Hoche to effect a landing at Bantry Bay in December 1796 and by the ruthlessness of government counter-measures may have played a role. While the dominant view in the leadership was that a resort to arms had to await a further French attempt, Coigly "took the radical view of O’Connor, Fitzgerald and Neilson, that independent action was essential".

Coigly, however, took the opportunity of exile to form the alliances that would reassure the more hesitant leaders in Ireland and advance the call for a general insurrection. He had been to Paris in 1796 and on that occasion had carried an address from the "Secret Committee of England" to the French Directory. Coigly radicalism was closer to the egalitarianism of the Defenders than to the liberal constitutionalism of many the leading United Irishmen. He found that it resonated with the distressed textile workers of Lancashire as it had with artisans, journeymen and their apprentices in Belfast and Dublin.

In Manchester, Coigly described himself as an emissary of the United Irish executive and carried copies of an address that encouraged the assassination of "the petty tyrants of Manchester … and the rest would fear as they did in Ireland". He made contact with James Dixon, a cotton spinner from Belfast, who had been instrumental in converting the Manchester Corresponding Society into the republican United Englishmen bound by a test that promised to "Remove the diadem and take off the crown ... [and to] exalt him that is low and abuse him that is high". Together they helped to spread of the United system to Stockport, Bolton, Warrington and Birmingham, while further north, contact was made with the United Scotsmen.

From Manchester, Coigly travelled on to London where he conferred with those Irishmen who had hastened the radicalisation of the London Corresponding Society. Among them were Colonel Edward Despard (executed for high treason in 1803), William Henry Hamilton (who had also engaged in "uniting" among Defenders in Ulster), brothers Benjamin and John Binns, Valentine Brown, Arthur O'Connor, John Fenwick, Alexander Galloway (president of the LCS in 1797), Jone Bone (secretary in 1797) and Thomas Evans,(secretary in 1798). Resolved "to overthrow the present Government, and to join the French as soon as they made a landing in England", they financed Coigly's onward journey to France.

Coigly travelled via Hamburg with Arthur MacMahon, a Presbyterian minister and United Irish "colonel" from Holywood, County Down. In Paris, Coigly described as his "good fortune" to meet again with James Bartholomew Blackwell, now a French officer and a veteran of Hoche's Irish expedition, who provided him protection. Coigly had an audience with Talleyrand. But he met with suspicion from Edward Lewins who, seconded by Wolfe Tone, was recognised as the official United Irish delegate in the French capital. Lewins position had been challenged by the arrival from the United States in June 1797 of the more impatient Napper Tandy, and was weakened by the sudden death, in September, General Hoche their key ally in the French leadership. Siding with Tandy, Coigly resolved to secure in Dublin Lewins's replacement. On 30 November 1797 Coigly crossed to London via Hamburg where he stayed some days with Samuel Turner of Newry, the United Irish representative in the city. Turner was a British informer so on his arrival in England, Coigly's every move was monitored by Bow Street Runners.

On 3 January 1798 at Furnival's Inn, Holborn, Coigly met with united delegates from London, Scotland and the regions. Styling themselves the national committee of the United Britons they voted solidarity with the United Irishmen, an address that Coigly and Benjamin Binns carried to Dublin. It was widely circulated among the United Irish and encouraged their military preparations. Lord Edward Fitzgerald granted Coigly a commission to replace Lewins in Paris with Arthur O’Connor. Coigly returned to London in the first week of February. He met with the north of England radicals en route, informing them that this would be his last visit; if he returned it would be to see the Tree of Liberty planted in Manchester.

== Arrest, trial and execution ==
On 28 February 1798, betrayed by the informer Samuel Turner, Coigly was apprehended in a party with O'Connor, Benjamin Binns, and John Allen as they were about to embark from Margate on a Channel crossing to France. Coilgy had begged O'Connor to come with him to Paris to replace Edward Lewins, the official United Irish envoy, upon whom he had misplaced the suspicion that should identify Turner.

Brought before the Privy Council, Coigly (or O'Coigley as he was commonly referred to in reports) denied under questioning from William Pitt ever being a member of the Corresponding Society, the Whig Club or "any other of the political societies" in England or to have ever attended their meetings. The arrests and the appearance of the prisoners before the Privy Council caused great excitement and occasioned, on grounds of conspiracy with France, the arrest, in a raid on Oliver Bond's house in Dublin, of almost the entire Leinster directory of the United Irishmen, and a round-up of English radicals extending to Manchester, Leicester and Birmingham.

O'Connor impressed the jurors with an appearance on his behalf by Charles James Fox, Lord Moria and Richard Brinsley Sheridan other Whig luminaries, while mounting a defence in which he was reprimanded by the judge for prejudicing the case of the other defendants. In Coigly's coat pocket had been found what proved to be the only admissible evidence of treason, an address from "The Secret Committee of England’" to the Directory of France. While its suggestion of a mass movement primed to welcome Napoleon, the "hero of Italy", was scarcely credible, it was proof that Coigly's intent was to invite and encourage a French invasion. Coigly refused the offer of his life in return for implicating his fellow defendants who were acquitted. He had also refused an offer from John Binns to take the blame for the seditious address.

In condemning Coigly, the judge, Justice Buller, derided the defendant's apparent faith in the French government.

Could such persons [who had supported Coigly in his mission] hope that they themselves should enjoy liberty, even supposing the conquerors to have enjoyed as free a constitution as any in the world? No, they would become suspected, be despised, and destroyed by them. A celebrated writer (Montesquieu) very justly observed upon this subject, that a country conquered by a democratic nation always enjoyed less liberty, was more miserable, and more enslaved, than if that country happened to have been conquered by a nation whose government was monarchial. But if there was any illustration of this observation wanting, one had only to look to the conduct of the French at this moment towards Holland, Italy, Switzerland, and every other country they had conquered.

He passed the following sentence: "That the prisoner be taken from the bar to prison, and from thence to the place of execution; there to be hanged, but not until he be dead, to be cut down while yet alive, and then to have his heart and bowels taken out and burnt before his face; his head to be severed from his body; and his body to be divided into four quarters."

Contrary to a contemporary account which has Coigly at the steps of the gallows taking absolution from a clergyman and thanking the gaoler "for the many civilities he had shown him", the early historian of the United Irishmen, R. R. Madden, reports that Coigly's request for last sacraments had produced a loyalist priest (a "Castle-Catholic") who refused rites unless Coigly revealed to him the names of those the authorities still hoped to implicate in his conspiracy. Father Coigly would not talk and it was without final absolution that Coigly's sentence was executed at Penenden Heath, Maidstone on 7 June 1798. Another account has the government priest, a Father Griffiths (who had helped break the resolve of Irish mutineers at the Nore), relenting on the day of execution, so that absolution was indeed given.

From the scaffold—again according to Madden—Coigly declared that his true and only "crime" in the eyes of those who condemned him was to have "taught the people that no man can serve his God by persecuting other for religious opinions" and to have been "very active in procuring a long address to the king, to put an end to a calamitous and destructive war".

On receiving the news of Coigly's execution, Tone wrote in his diary: "If I ever reach Ireland I will be the first to propose a monument to his memory". Yet Coigly was written out of the general narrative history of 1798. For the centenary of the rebellion, pilgrimages were organised to Maidstone and addressed by members of the Irish Parliamentary Party, but the events attracted little attention. The assembled attended mass at St Francis Church in Maidstone, where in Coigly's memory they installed three stained glass windows (dedicated to Saints Patrick. Brigid and Francis) and a brass cross inscribed in English and Irish.

== Letter from Prison ==
On 7 June 1998, a memorial was unveiled to Coigly in St. Patrick's Cemetery in Armagh. In the oration, Monsignor Réamonn Ó Muirí read from a letter Coigly wrote from prison. While he assured Irish Catholics of his attachment to "the principles of our holy religion", Coigly addressed himself to Irish Presbyterians:

Born and bread amongst you, you know of my exertions--how ardently I cherished the hope of seeing all party rage, intolerance, bigotry, baneful prejudice, and religious animosity forever buried under the Alter of National Union [...], the Union that the Immortal Orr sealed with his blood and which we Catholics are sealing with our blood every day. [...] As I shall not have the satisfaction of dying among you, my wish is that even my bones should rest at Belfast, but that is also denied me.
