= Charles Edward Jennings =

Irish soldier (1751–1799)

Charles Edward Jennings de Kilmaine
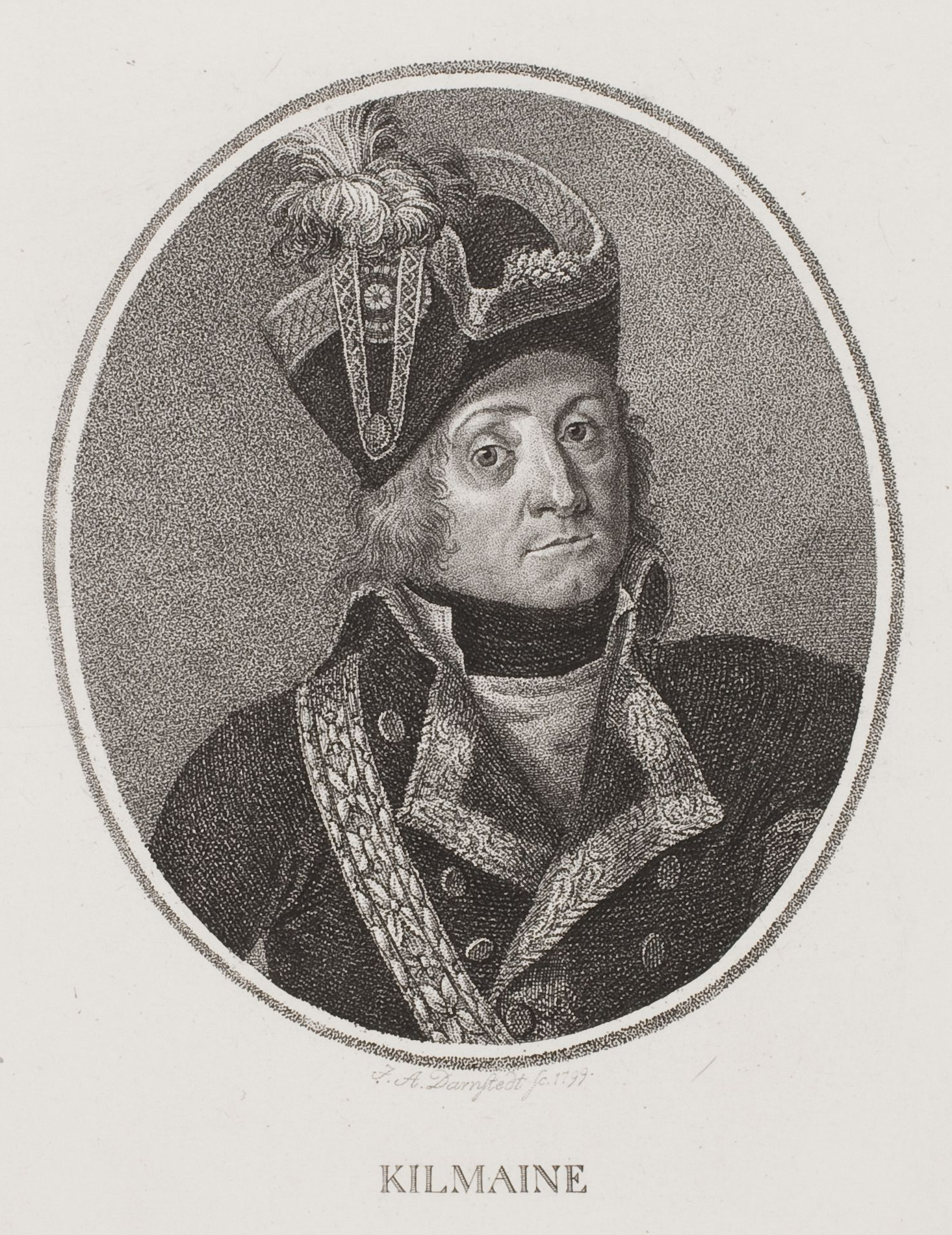
- Born: 19 October 1751; Sauls Court, Dublin, Ireland
- Died: 11 December 1799 (aged 48); Paris, France
- Military career
- Allegiance: United Irishmen; Kingdom of France; French First Republic
- Branch: Austrian Army; French Army
- Service years: 1765–1799
- Rank: General of division
- Nickname: Brave Kilmaine
- Conflicts: Senegal Campaign; American Revolutionary War; French Revolutionary Wars

Charles Edward Jennings de Kilmaine (19 October 1751 – 11 December 1799) was an Irish-born French army officer who served under Napoleon. He was a staunch supporter of Irish independence from British rule in Ireland, while being an active supporter of the French Revolution. Kilmaine is known to have been an associate of Wolfe Tone, Thomas Paine and Napper Tandy.

Kilmaine served in both the American Revolutionary War and the French Revolutionary Wars. He played a minor role in Irish Rebellion of 1798, going as far as to set up secret meetings between Tone and Napoleon. Kilmaine was known for being one of the most charismatic Irish generals of the Revolutionary and Napoleonic period. Though he was not ennobled, he is sometimes referred to as de Kilmaine and Baron de Kilmaine in reference to the Jennings's ancestral home in Kilmaine, County Mayo.

== Early life ==
Jennings was born on 19 October 1751 in Dublin at Saul's Court, Temple Bar. His father, Dr. Theobald Jennings of Polaniran (Irish: Poll an Iarainn) (Ironpool), near Tuam, County Galway, was a prominent physician who married a cousin, Eleanor Saul, daughter of Laurence Saul, a wealthy Dublin distiller. One of his ancestors, Richard Og MacJonin, was hanged in 1599 during the Nine Years' War in the Elizabethan period. In 1738, Dr. Jennings and Eleanor left Ireland and settled in Tonnay-Charente in south-west France. In 1751, when Eleanor became pregnant, she left France for Dublin in order to have her child born in Ireland. Jennings spent his early childhood in Saul's Court with his relatives. When he was 11 years old, he left Ireland and joined his father in France. Jennings was educated in Tonnay-Charente and became proficient in French.

== Military career ==
Jennings began his military career in 1764 at the age of 14 when he joined the Austrian army. After seven years' of service as a junior officer in Austria, he entered the French army. In September 1778, Kilmaine was appointed adjutant of Lauzun's Legion, a mercenary unit commanded by Armand Louis de Gontaut. He served with this unit during the French invasion of Saint-Louis, Senegal in 1779 and in America under Rochambeau (1780–83) and remained after it was reorganized as a hussar regiment.

=== American Revolutionary War ===
In 1780, Jennings was appointed sous-lieutenant of Lauzun's Legion. He served under Rochambeau and the Marquis de Lafayette during the American Revolutionary War. On 18 July 1781 Jennings commanded a detachment of lancers from the legion. The lancers pushed back Hessian Chasseurs defending an outpost at Morrisania, New York, this action occurred during the march to Yorktown. He was deeply affected by his experiences in America. This, combined with the impressions made upon him during his youth in Ireland and the teachings of his father, caused Jennings to imbibe strongly the revolutionary ideals of the era. He developed strong republican principles and upon his return to France, he became an energetic supporter of the French Revolution.

=== Chef d'Escadron ===
In 1786, he was awarded the title Lieutenant in command and took control of the regiment of Hussars of Duc de Lauzun. Two years later he attained the rank of Captain. A growing military reputation brought him a further promotion to chef d'escadron.

On 21 March 1791, seven months before his 40th birthday, he honourably retired from the army, was given the French title of Baron and took the civic oath, sworn by all persons as a pre-condition for French citizenship. This was especially important leading up to and during the French Revolution, particularly among foreigners and nobility. He pursued family life and philanthropic interests for almost a year. In 1792, by personal invitation of Gilbert du Motier, Marquis de Lafayette, Jennings rejoined the French army when war broke out between France and monarchic Europe.

Reinstated as a chef d'escadron, Jennings served in the French Revolutionary Wars. He was a Corps Commander under Charles François Dumouriez and Lafayette. He fought at the Battle of Valmy in September 1792 and a unit of hussars under his command saved an entire French division from annihilation. In November 1792 at the Battle of Jemappes, Kilmaine and the Duke of Chartres (Louis Philippe) turned apparent defeat into victory. On the field, he was raised to the rank of Chief Colonel and came to be known as "le brillant et courageux Kilmaine" (The brilliant and courageous Kilmaine).

=== General and Division Command ===
Kilmaine continued to serve with the Army of the North, and proved to be one of its capable officers. Following the victory at Jemappes, the Army of the North comprised 48 infantry battalions and 3,200 cavalrymen. By December 1792, thanks to the neglect of the Revolutionary Government, these troops were shirtless, shoeless, starving and in rags. Fifteen hundred men deserted. Kilmaine's cavalry were critically short of boots, saddles, weapons and horses. Nearly 6,000 troop and baggage horses died at Lisle and Tongres for want of forage. Honourable testimony has been given to the unceasing efforts of Kilmaine to preserve order among his soldiers amid these horrors. He frequently endeavoured by private contribution to provide subsistence for his men, who roved about in bands, robbing the villages around their cantonments at Aix-la-Chapelle. Many of Kilmaine's soldiers were murdered by vengeful peasants when found straggling alone away from their billets. Kilmaine was named general of brigade on 8 March 1793.

After the defection and flight of Dumouriez in April 1793, Kilmaine adhered to the National Convention, and was rewarded with a promotion to general of division on 15 May 1793. He now redoubled his energies to restore order in the army, which by the defection of its leader was almost disbanded. Auguste Marie Henri Picot de Dampierre took command. He was so ably seconded by Kilmaine, that within one month after he assumed command discipline was completely restored.

=== Battle of Raismes and Retreat to Conde ===
Kilmaine commanded Dampierre's advance guard in the campaign against the allied powers after the failure of the Congress of Antwerp on 8 April 1793. Dispatches testified to Kilmaine's gallantry during the "murderous affairs of the 1st and 2nd May" in which, according to the official report, he had two chargers killed from under him as he managed to fight off a determined attack. Six days of incessant skirmishing followed. Kilmaine displayed extraordinary valour on 8 May during the Battle of Raismes, fought by Dampierre to deliver Condé-sur-l'Escaut. The French were defeated with heavy losses. Dampierre was slain, and Kilmaine was ordered to fight a rearguard action to cover the retreat. The infuriated and disorderly army fell back to the barrier town of Condé, which was at that time under the nominal lordship of the unfortunate Duke d'Enghien.

François Joseph Drouot de Lamarche succeeded Dampierre and sent Kilmaine with his division to the Armée des Ardennes. He remained there only a short time before being recalled to the main army, which he found in the most critical circumstances.

The fall of de Dampierre and the arrest of Adam Philippe, Comte de Custine acted fatally on the Army of the North. It was now reduced to about thirty thousand rank-and-file soldiers. These men remained in a disorderly state, without a proper chief, and without aim or object. The Army's manoeuvrings were committed to chance or directed by ignorance, for, with the exception of Kilmaine, its leaders were destitute of skill, experience, and energy. Quitting the camp of Caesar, they returned to their fortified position at Famars, three miles distant from Valenciennes, the approach to which it covered. Here they were attacked on 23 May, driven back, and obliged to abandon the city to its own garrison under Jean Henri Becays Ferrand.

=== Commander-in-Chief of the Armée du Nord ===
Kilmaine was named Commander-in-Chief of the Armée du Nord on 17 July 1793. He rejoined the army with his division from the Armée des Ardennes. Kilmaine's presence for a time appeased the disorder in the army. The Army of the North occupied positions on the banks of the Scheldt, facing a much larger opposing force jointly commanded by the Duke of York and Albany and the Prince of Coburg. Kilmaine, with only 24,000 troops, did not wish to attack due to their smaller numbers. Only 40 leagues lay between Kilmaine's position and Paris. If he fought and lost the day, he could thereafter assume no position of sufficient strength to prevent the allies from penetrating Paris and crushing the convention. Kilmaine's position was untenable. He did not abandon the capital or retire beyond the Loire, as the tides of war and politics were setting in against him. In the Battle of Caesar's Camp on 7–8 August Kilmaine withdrew his army rather than wait to be surrounded. Although he carried out a retreat, the Convention styled it (at the time) "completely mutinous."

== Imprisonment and release ==
Due to his retreat at Caesar's Camp and suspicions regarding his foreign birth and relations abroad, Kilmaine was relieved of his command, discharged from the army and sent into exile to Luxembourg. Regarding his situation, he said "I am ready, to serve the cause of the Republic in whatever rank I am placed, and wherever sent I shall do my duty."

Kilmaine returned to Paris undercover and retired with his wife to the Parisian suburb of Passy. There they lived quietly for a few months. When the Reign of Terror began, he and his wife were arrested and imprisoned. Kilmaine escaped the guillotine and was released after the fall of Robespierre in July 1794. He and his wife were released on an order signed by Lazare Carnot and remained for some time in Paris.

== Italian Campaign ==
Kilmaine was involved in quelling the Jacobin Uprising in May 1795. He assisted Jean-Charles Pichegru in the defence of the National Convention against excited mobs of Parisian faubourgs. Kilmaine continued to fight for the convention until the 13th Vendemiaire, 1796, actively cooperating with Napoleon and the Revolutionary Party.

Early in 1796, he set out with Bonaparte on the Italian Campaign. He fought at the Battle of Lodi on 10 May and contributed to the victory by leading a cavalry charge. In September, he was appointed Commander of Northern Italy. His actions in this campaign significantly increased his reputation throughout Europe.

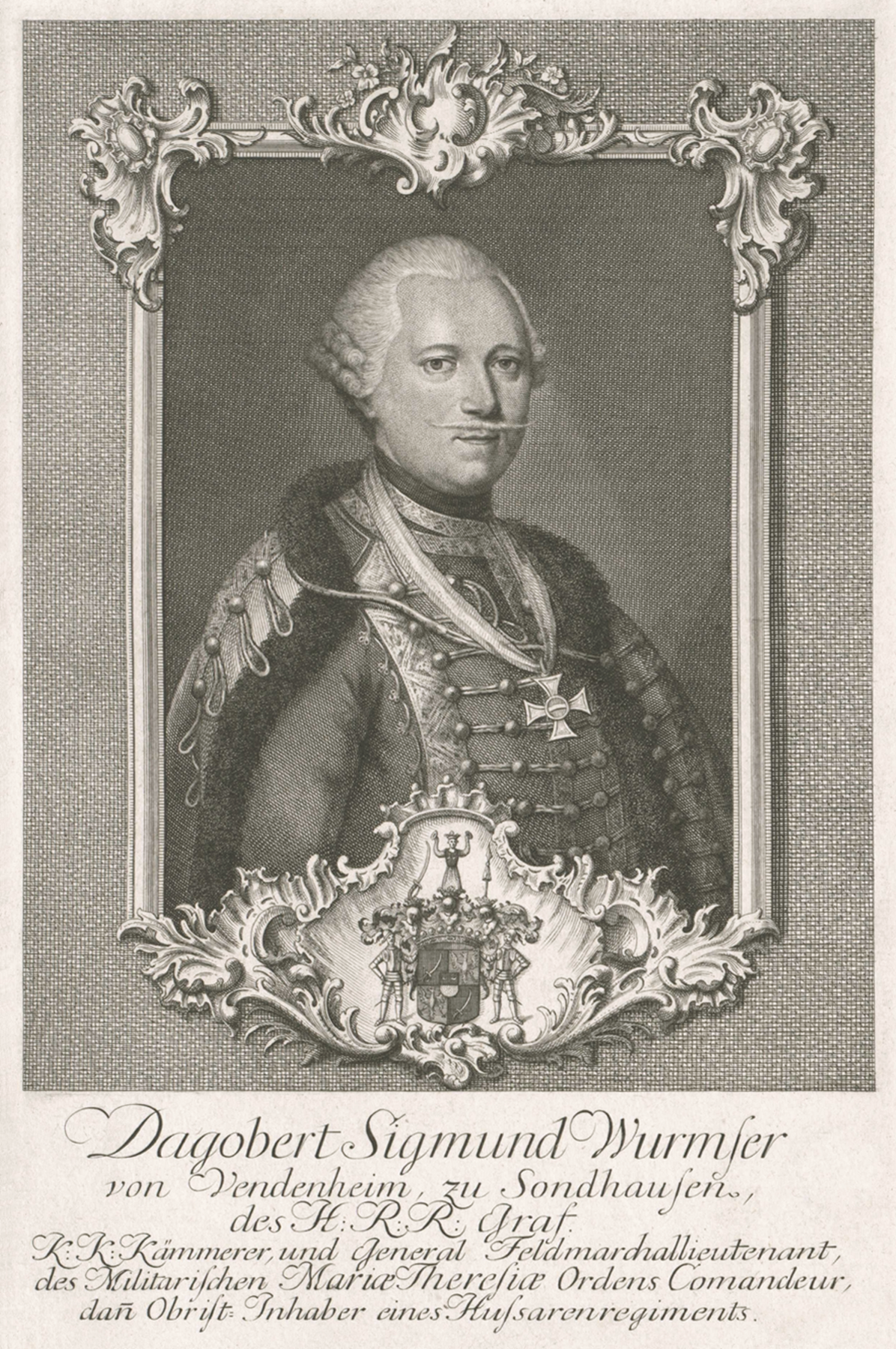
Dagobert Sigismund Count de Wurmser

In October, Kilmaine was one of Napoleon's subordinate commanders during the siege of Mantua. The Austrians, who were commanded by Dagobert Sigmund von Wurmser, attempted to break out and were repulsed with the loss of 1,100 men and five pieces of cannon. Kilmaine played a key role in repulsing them. Bonaparte, in his dispatch to the Directory on 1 October 1796 wrote:

General Kilmaine, who commands the two divisions which press the siege of Mantua, remained on the 29th ultimo in his former position, and was still in hopes that the enemy would attempt a sortie to carry forage into the place, but instead they took up a position before the gate of Pradello, near the Carthusian convent and the chapel of Cerese. The brave General Kilmaine made his arrangements for an attack, and advanced in two columns against these two points, but he had scarcely begun to march when the enemy evacuated their camps, their rear having fired only a few musket-shots at him. The advanced posts of General Vaubois have come up with the Austrian division which defends the Tyrol and made one hundred and ten prisoners."

Early in December, Wurmser attempted another breakout. The Austrians began their operation just before dawn advancing under a furious cannonade. However, as Bonaparte noted, "Kilmaine made him return, as usual, faster than he came out, and took from him two hundred men, one howitzer, and two pieces of cannon. This is his third unsuccessful attempt."

Kilmaine energetically and ably commanded troops involved in the Siege of Mantua for over 5 months. Wurmser finally surrendered on 3 February 1797. In a dispatch notifying the Minister of War about this important victory Kilmaine wrote:

Kilmaine, General de Division and Commandant of Lombardy, to the Minister of War. Milan, 17 Pluviose, 1797

Citizen Minister,

I avail myself of a courier which general Bonaparte sends from Romagna (in order to announce to the Directory the defeat of the Papal troops), to acquaint you with the capture of Mantua, the news of which I received yesterday evening by a courier from Mantua itself I thought it necessary to announce this circumstance, because General Bonaparte, who is occupied in Romagna annihilating the troops of his Holiness, may probably have been ignorant of this fact when his courier departed. Tho garrison are our prisoners of war and are to be sent into Germany in order to be exchanged. I have not yet received the articles of capitulation, but the commander-in-chief will not fail to send them by the first courier.

The capture of Mantua was celebrated in Paris by the firing of cannon and the erection of arches in honour of Bonaparte and Kilmaine "the Irish Commandant of Lombardy", and citizens celebrated the fall of what they styled the Gibraltar of Italy, while Bonaparte, loaded with the diamonds of the vanquished corrupt Pope, and the spoils of Our Lady of Loretto, pushed on to seek fresh conquests and new laurels. Kilmaine briefly remained in command in Mantua after its capitulation. Upon returning to Paris, he was awarded the title Baron de Kilmaine.

== Commander-in-chief of the Armée d'Angleterre ==
In the spring of 1798, the French were preparing to invade Britain and Ireland. In the February of that year, a grand march to the coast of the Channel took place. The invasion force consisted of forty demi-brigades of infantry, thirty-four regiments of cavalry, two regiments of horse artillery, two regiments of foot artillery, six companies of sappers and pioneers, and six battalions of miners and pontooniers. This task force was led by eighteen distinguished generals of division, and forty-seven generals of brigade the most brave and able in France. Among the former were Kilmaine, Louis Alexandre Berthier, Jean Baptiste Kléber, André Masséna, Jacques MacDonald, Michel Ney, Claude Perrin Victor, and others whose names were to become famous in future wars as the marshals of the empire. Headed by bands blaring martial music, the soldiers marched through Paris, displaying black banners inscribed with slogans such as

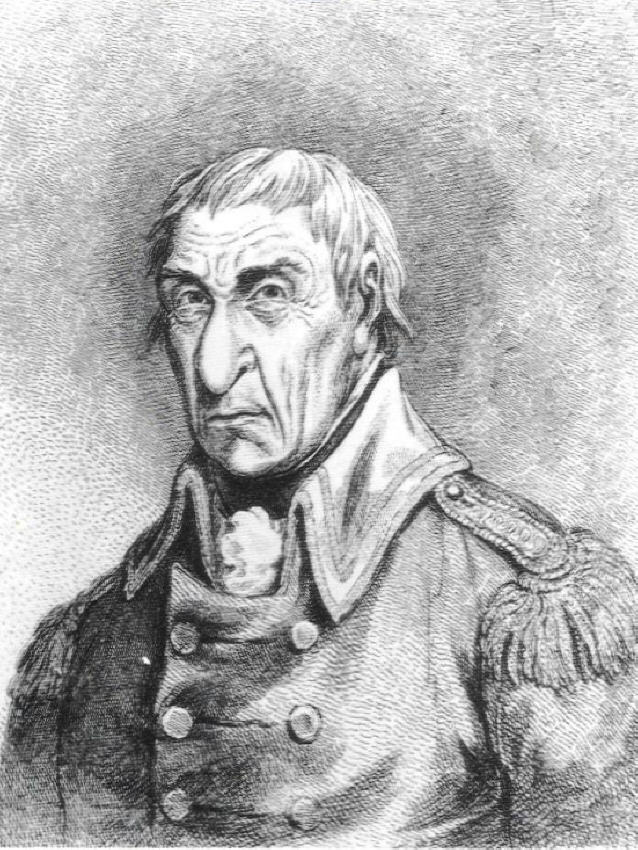
Napper Tandy

"Descent upon England, long live the Republic! May Britain perish"

On St. Patrick's Day, Kilmaine recorded in his memoirs that he hosted a great banquet in Paris. Along with many Irish generals, including Colonel Henri Shée, and all the Irishmen in Paris. Other guests in attendance were Irish rebels James Bartholomew Blackwell, William Corbet and Napper Tandy, also there was the notorious American radical and intellectual Thomas Paine (then a political fugitive and pseudo-anarchist, who had been invited to attend by Kimaine) and General O'Cher. (Note: O'Cher is likely Kilmaine's nickname for Barthélemy Louis Joseph Schérer.) The Irish republican Wolfe Tone had not been present at the banquet. He was hiding in Paris around this time and had been holding secret meetings with Napoleon (set up through Kilmaine) to discuss an Irish Revolution. Tone detested many of the Irishmen in Paris, describing them as "sad, vulgar wretches, and I have been used to rather better company in all respects", and stayed well away. However, all the corresponding members of the Irish clubs and malcontent parties at home were also present. Many fierce end-stirring political toasts were drunk, amid vociferous enthusiasm, among these, one in particular,

"Long live the Irish Republic, long live the Republic."

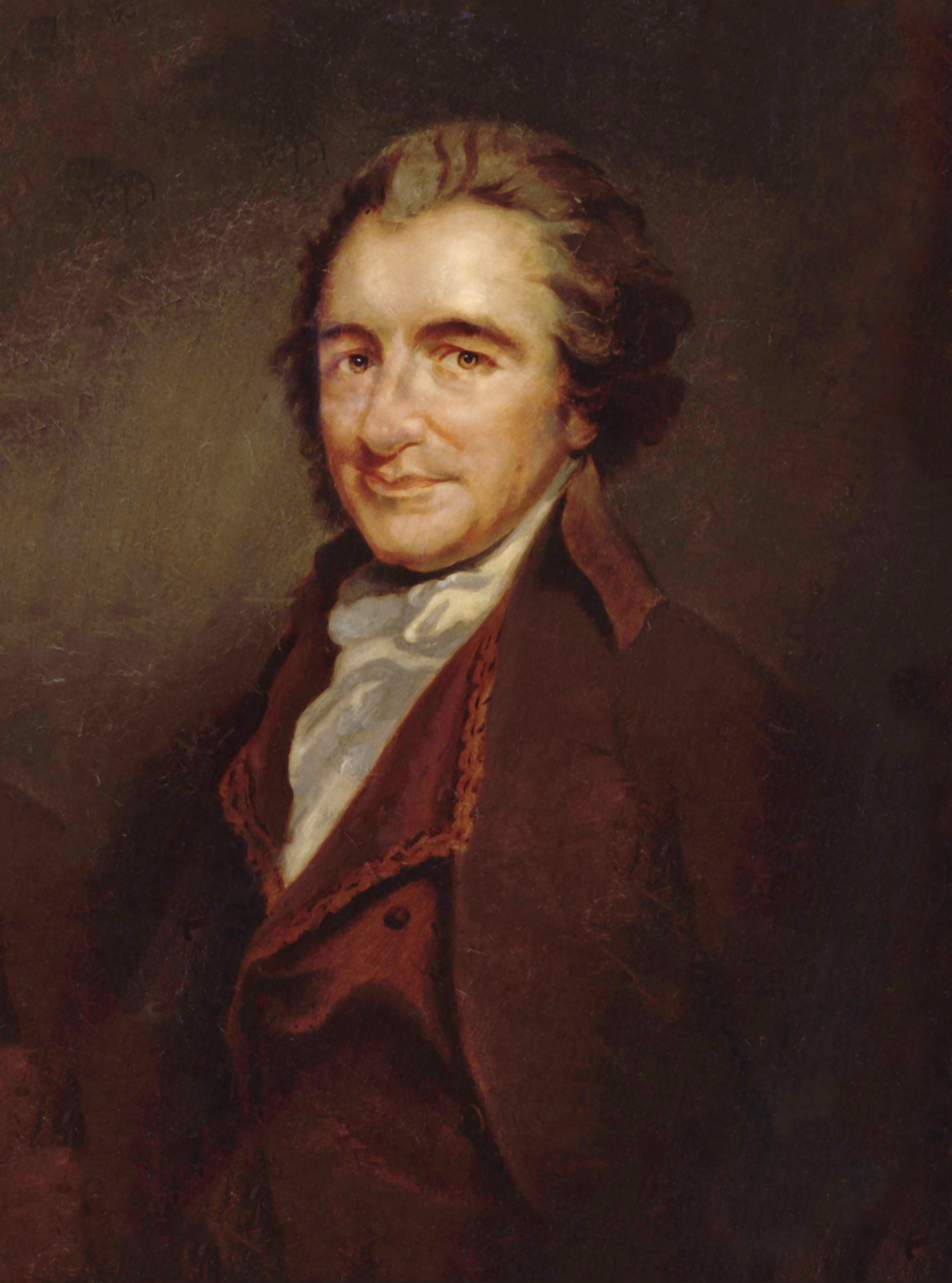
Thomas Paine

Speeches were made expressive of the rapid progress which republicanism had made in their native country, and of the strong desire of the Catholics and Dissenters to throw off the yoke of England, (that yoke which Kilmaine in his boyhood had been taught by his father to abhor and to hate). Irish rebel leader Napper Tandy, was in the chair for most of the night, on his left sat none other than Thomas Paine, and on his right sat Kilmaine, who, immediately after the banquet, had to leave Paris to rejoin his column of the army on the coast.

Kilmaine acknowledged the future Irish Republic that night and expressed confidence that Irish independence would eventually be achieved.

Within days hundreds of gunboats were ordered to be prepared, and transports were to be collected at Dunkirk, to be protected from the Royal Navy by a Batavian Navy squadron then at the mouth of the Scheldt. Meanwhile, the condition of France was then absolutely desperate and wild. In April, Kilmaine returned to Paris, after having executed, by order of the government, a survey of all the coasts of France and Holland (then reduced to a province of the former). He was promptly appointed Commander-in-Chief of the Armée d'Angleterre destined for the invasion of the British Isles. The position which had been meant for Louis Desaix, the hero of Marengo, was now bestowed upon him. As the supreme chief of command of this famous militia force, the eyes of all Europe were now fixed firmly on him.

French whispers throughout Europe at the time assert that this expedition was destined, not for Britain, but in fact for Egypt, and that Kilmaine received the command of it, not so much for his great military skill, but as to deceive the ministry, supposing that the name of an Irishman would cause them to believe that the armament was destined for Ireland and so they named him General in Chief of the Armee d'Angleterre, which never existed at all. Even if this was the case Kilmaine didn't know it. The number of transports was soon increased to over a thousand, and all the naval and military resources of Holland were pressed into the French service and managed by Kilmaine.

Colonel Shee, Tone, General Henri-Jacques-Guillaume Clarke, General Jean Joseph Amable Humbert and Kilmaine, were by this time hard at work planning an Irish invasion. They were well acquainted with the extent of the military organization of the United Irishmen and knew that by the close of the preceding year, the people were well provided with arms, and knew the use of them. At the beginning of 1797, great quantities were discovered and seized by the Dublin Castle administration, who, in Leinster and Ulster alone, captured 70,630 pikes, with 48,109 muskets. If the Irish managed their projected rising, one cannot for a moment doubt what the result would be, once Kilmaine's formidable expedition landed in Ireland.

== Irish assault ==
Meanwhile, Kilmaine's health was slowly declining. The duties of a 47-year-old Kilmaine were alike harassing and arduous, as he had to superintend the equipment and organization of this vast force, composed of men of all arms and several nations, and he was repeatedly summoned to Paris, even in the middle of the night, by couriers who overtook him in his progress, thus, though suffering under severe ill health. The Directory once brought him on the spur from Bruges early in July, and again from Brest about the end of the same month only to bring him back a few days later.

During the summer of 1798, the European press were full of words expressing admiration for Kilmaine.

Citizen d'Arbois, an officer on Kilmaine's staff, sent a glowing account of Kilmaine's mission to the Paris newspapers, where it was published on 7 August 1798. He wrote:

"The eagerness with which our troops, both by sea and land, await the moment when, under the brave and brilliant warrior Kilmaine, they will engage the English, is the best pledge of our approaching success, and the defeat of our enemies."

Around this time too, a Brussels newspaper stated,

"We are assured that the French republicans shall be able to make a successful descent upon Ireland, the Belgian youth will be employed in that country under General Kilmaine, who, being a native of it, will there have the command of the French and Irish forces."

Doubts hovered in the minds of the Directory, even if there were none in the hearts of their soldiers and generals, and long delays ensued. General Hoche, who was the mainspring of the projected movement in favour of Ireland, died. And Bonaparte, to whom Kilmaine, Tone, Shee, and others of the Irish patriots turned, no longer had any sympathy for their cause, as all his efforts were now focused on the war in the East.

=== Paddy Kilmaine ===
In 1798 the Directory began breaking up the Armee d'Angleterre, and withdrew Kilmaine's troops. Kilmaine went to Paris to plead with the government and the Minister of Marine concerning the embarkation of the troops and departure of the fleet. His questions were waived or left unanswered. They had more important plans for him.

The fate of Chief-commander Kilmaine's forces that 'independently' sailed to Ireland was sealed from the onset.

The first attempt, from Brest on 22 August, initially got off to a good start. Approximately 1,000 French soldiers under General Humbert landed in the northwest of the country, at Kilcummin in County Mayo. They joined up to 5,000 local rebels and occupied Castlebar, setting up a short-lived "Republic of Connaught". They were defeated at the battle of Ballinamuck, in County Longford, on 8 September 1798. The French troops who surrendered were repatriated to France in exchange for British prisoners of war, but hundreds of captured United Irishmen rebels were executed.

A second attempt in September, accompanied by Napper Tandy, came to disaster on the coast of Donegal and was unable to land, before eventually returning to France.

The third and final attempt, on 12 October 1798, under Admiral Bompard, with General Hardy in command of a larger force of about 3,000 men, including Tone himself, never had a chance. They attempted to land in County Donegal near Lough Swilly, but were intercepted by a larger Royal Navy squadron, and eventually surrendered after a three-hour battle without ever landing in Ireland. Tone was captured, taken prisoner and was tried in a court-martial.

For some time the British supposed the troops were led by the commander-in-chief in person and all the press of England and Scotland teemed with blustering or scurrilous remarks on "Paddy Kilmaine and his gang". In truth General Kilmaine never embarked, although he certainly wanted to, as commander in Chief, a master tactician and without the blessing of his commander Napoleon, he superintended the departure of 6,000 of his troops from Rochefort and Brest.

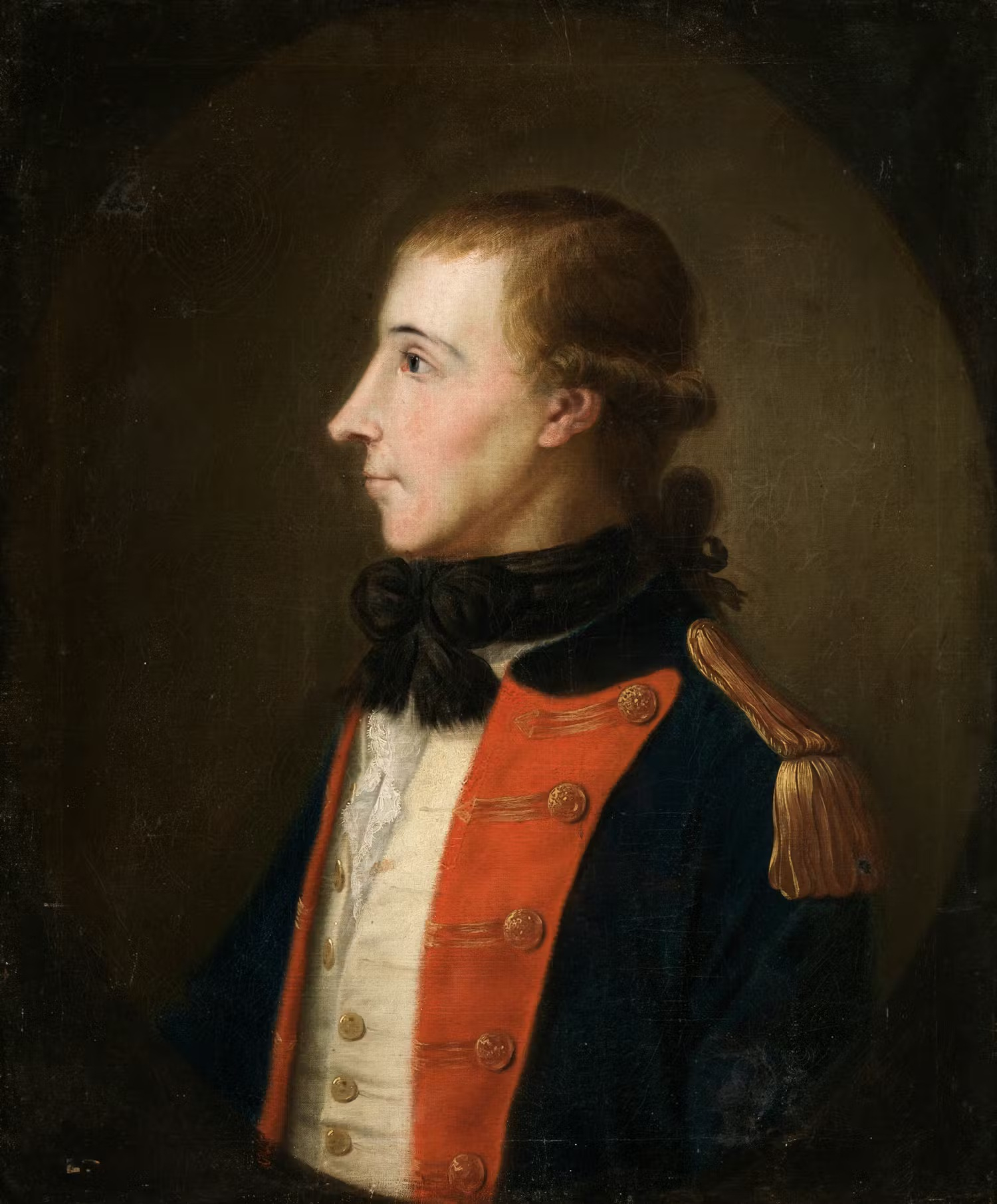
Wolfe Tone

=== Broken dreams ===
By the end of 1798, the Army of England and its expedition were alike completely dissolved, and The Directory turned their ambition totally eastwards and to the Middle East. Napoleon now wished to give Kilmaine command of the forces assembled for the great war in Egypt. But for the present his career finished on the coasts of France and Holland, looking out toward fighting Ireland.

The Directory's outright decision to abandon the project completely shattered all of Kilmaine's hopes of helping to achieve the independence of his native land. For some years an intimate friendship had existed between him and fellow Irishman Tone (while the latter lived in Paris) and upon hearing of his friend's arrest in Ireland, he strongly urged the French government to intervene in his case and to hold for Tones safety, hostages of equal rank chosen from British prisoners of war in France. He assembled a petition and wrote a brilliant letter to the President of the Executive Directory, it reads,

Headquarters at Rouen

27th Brumaire, 7th year of the Republic.

Kilmaine, General in Chief of the Army of England to the President of the Executive Directory

Citizen President,

From the assurances which the executive Directory has given, that the Adjudant General Smith, taken on board the Hoche, shall be claimed in a peremptory manner, it would be superfluous in me to request your interference a second time. But, as Commander in Chief of the Army, in which he served with such distinction, I consider myself as in duty bound to acquaint the Directory more particularly with that officer. His real name is Tone; that of Smith was assumed to conceal from the English Government his residence in France, and spare to his family in Ireland those persecutions which would infallibly inflict upon them. Obliged, as he had been one of the most zealous and respectable apostles of the cause of liberty in his country, to seek a refuge from its tyrants in North America, he was called from thence, on the demand of the French Government, to co-operate with General Hoche in his first expedition to Ireland. He was then promoted to the rank of Adjutant General and served the Republic in that capacity in the Army of England, where he was known to me in the most advantageous light, and had acquired, by his talents and social qualities, the esteem and friendship of all the Generals with whom he served. He was employed in the expedition of General Hardy, merely as a French officer, and ought to be acknowledged in that character; he had adopted France as his country; his right to be considered as a French prisoner of war is undoubted, and no one can regard him in any other light. I know not what treatment the British Government may reserve for him, but if it were other than such as any French officer, in a similar situation, has a claim to expect, I am clearly of the opinion that the Directory should designate some British prisoner of superior rank to serve as a hostage, and to undergo precisely the same treatment that Adjutant General Smith may suffer from the British Government. By this measure you may save to the Republic one of its most distinguished officers; to liberty, one of her most zealous and most enlightened defenders, and a father to one of the most interesting families which I have ever known.

Health and respect,

Kilmaine.

Even though he garnered much support from prominent Frenchmen and even Napoleon, his appeal was strangely ignored, much to Kilmaine's profound disapproval. Subsequently, Tone was found guilty and was sentenced to be hanged. He pleaded in virtue of his status as a French officer to die by the musket instead of the rope. Denied his wish, and before the sentence was carried out, he cheated and attempted suicide by slitting his own throat and died of his severe wounds days later.

== Generalissimo of the Armée d'Helvétie ==
At the beginning of 1799, Kilmaine's health was further deteriorating. He had also become greatly saddened by the death of his friend Tone. In the spring of 1799, the Directory appointed him supreme generalissimo of the Armée d'Helvétie, as they chose to designate Switzerland, reviving the ancient name of the people whom Julius Caesar conquered. The French troops already occupied Lombardy on one side, and the Rhenish provinces on the other. Thus, they never doubted their ability to conquer the Swiss and remodel the Helvetic constitution.

The 48-year-old Kilmaine accepted the command, and ignored his condition for quite some time, until his rapidly failing health forced him to give up his baton to Massena, and he was compelled to retire from active service for good.

With a sorrow which he could not conceal, he saw that army march which penetrated into the heart of the Swiss mountains and imposed on their hardy inhabitants a constitution in which Bonaparte, under the plausible title of Mediator, secured the cooperation of the valiant descendants of the Celtic tribe of Helvetii in his further schemes of conquest and ambition.

== Death ==
In a fragile condition, Kilmaine left Switzerland and returned to Passy in Paris, where his domestic issues only worsened his already poor health. He died there of dysentery on 11 December 1799, at the age of 48.

== Legacy ==
The Arc de Triomphe, Paris

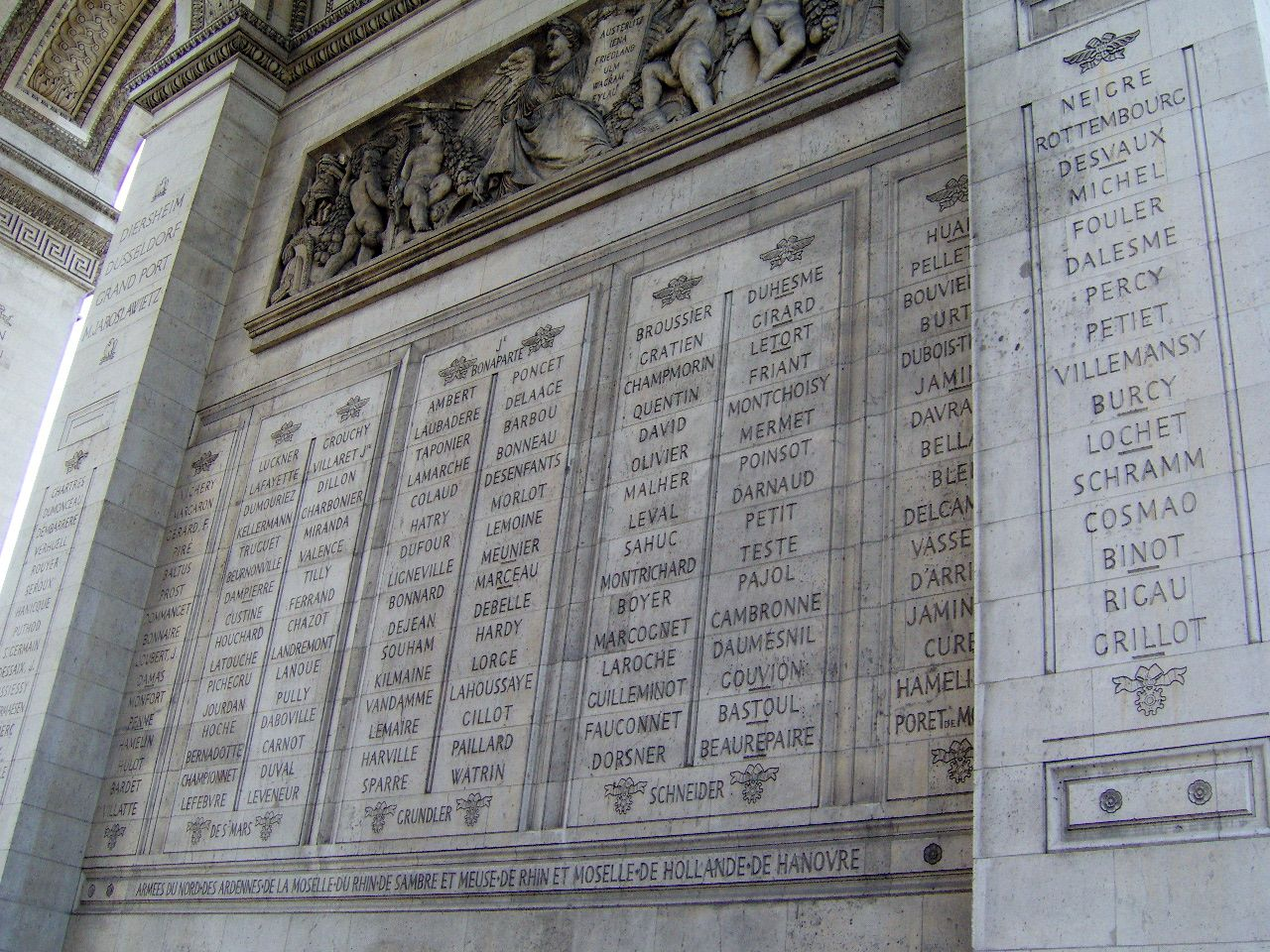
Kilmaine's name on the Northern pillar, Column 05

Kilmaine is historically honoured at the Arc de Triomphe in Paris, where his name can be seen on the inside triumphal arch, on the Northern pillar, Column 05. Underneath the Arc is the Tomb of the Unknown Soldier (World War I).

In the memoirs of Captain Jean Landrieux, his aide-de-camp, Kilmaine is described as

"The only officer in whom Napoleon ever placed complete and utter confidence."

A generous man, he frequently supplemented out of his own private means the rations of his men, who with difficulty were prevented from deserting and more importantly kept alive.

In the Memoirs published by General Charles Tristan, Marquis de Montholon, he wrote of Jennings,

"Brave and noble Kilmaine, being an excellent cavalry officer, had coolness and foresight, he was well fitted to command a corps of observation, detached upon those arduous or delicate commissions which require spirit, discernment, and sound judgment. He rendered important services to the army, of which he was one of the principal generals notwithstanding the delicacy of his health. He had a great knowledge of the Austrian troops, familiar with their tactics, he did not allow himself to be imposed upon by those rumors which they were in the habit of spreading in the rear of an army, nor to be dismayed by those heads of columns which they were wont to display in every direction, to deceive as to the real strength of their forces. His political opinions were brilliantly moderate."

Tone wrote of Kilmaine in his private journal. One of his diary entries read,

"Clarke then said there were some Irish officers yet remaining in France, who might go, and he mentioned Jennings, who used to call himself Baron de Kilmaine, God knows why. I answered, that in Ireland we had no great confidence in the officers of the old Irish Brigade, so many of them had either deserted, or betrayed the French cause, that, as to Jennings, he had had the unfortunate misfortune to command after Custine, and had been obliged to break up the famous "Camp de Caesar", that, though this might probably have been no fault of his, it had made an impression, and, as he was at any rate not a fortunate general but a typical Irish soldier of fortune, I thought it would maybe better to have a Frenchman."

There is a personal portrait of General Kilmaine in the 'Hotel de Ville' (City Hall) at Tonnay-Charente, where his father Dr. Theobald Jennings practiced as a physician.

A monument was erected in his memory in Tonnay-Charente in the 19th century.

Rue du Général Kilmaine, a street in Tonnay-Charente, was named in his honour in the 19th century.

== Descendants ==
Kilmaine married when he was relatively young and had at least one child. There is reason to believe that his wife 'Baroness de Kilmaine' died a few years before he did. There are likely numerous descendants of the Jennings family in Ireland. The Browne de Kilmaine family in France is not related to the general, but to The Hon. Frederick Longworth Browne, son of the 2nd Lord Kilmaine, who settled in France.

== See also ==
- Passy
- Kilmaine
- Tonnay-Charente
- James Bartholomew Blackwell

== Notes and citations ==
=== Citations ===
- McGarry, Stephen. (2013) Irish Brigades Abroad: from the Wild Geese to the Napoleonic Wars. Dublin: History Press Ireland. ISBN 1845887999
- Hayes, Richard J. (1949) "Charles Edward Jennings (Kilmaine)", A Biographical Dictionary of Irishmen in France, Dublin: MH Gill & Sons Ltd.
- Scott, Samuel F. "Kilmaine, Charles Edward Saul Jennings de (1751–1799)", Oxford Dictionary of National Biography, Oxford University Press, 2004, accessed 18 Feb 2008.
- Webb, Alfred. "Charles Jennings Kilmaine". LibraryIreland.
- Chisholm, Hugh, ed. (1911). "Kilmaine, Charles Edward" . Encyclopædia Britannica. Vol. 15 (11th ed.). Cambridge University Press. p. 797.
