= Samuel Turner (informer) =

Samuel Turner (1765–1807) was an Irish barrister, a Protestant supporter of the United Irishmen in Newry who in 1797 escaped to the European continent, changed loyalties, and informed the British and Irish authorities of United Irish activity and personnel in Ireland, Hamburg, and Paris.

== United Irishman ==
Samuel Turner was the son of Jacob Turner of Turner's Glen, near Newry, a gentleman of good fortune in County Armagh. He was educated at Trinity College, Dublin, where he entered on 2 July 1780, graduating B.A. in 1784, and LL.D. in 1787. Turner was called to the Irish bar in 1788, but does not seem to have practised. Although no evidence has been found of his previous involvement in democratic politics, in January 1797, by his own account, Turner was admitted not only to the United Irish Society but also to its national directory. By March 1797 he was being reported to the Arthur Hill, Marquess of Downshire, as one of the three most violent agitators in the Newry district.

In April 1797 Turner enhanced his reputation as a firebrand when he challenged the Crown's commander-in-chief in Ireland, Henry Luttrell, Earl of Carhampton, to a duel after the latter had reproached him in a Newry inn with wearing United Irish colours and torn from him the offending green necktie. Carhampton apologised.

Six weeks later, however, Turner spoke to the assistant barrister for County Down, Joseph Pollock about the prospects for surrendering himself under a recent amnesty proclamation. Outwardly still loyal to the United Irish, at the beginning of June Turner was one of the five who represented Ulster at a meeting of United Irishmen in Dublin to consider their state of preparedness for an uprising and reception of a French expedition. Like other Ulster leaders, threatened with arrest, he soon fled to the Continent joining other United Irish fugitives in the German free city of Hamburg. In the late summer of 1797, he visited Paris where he met the foreign minister, Talleyrand. On his return to Hamburg the French ambassador, Jean Frédéric Reinhard, gave him a passport enabling him to go to London and meet both with Lord Edward FitzGerald, who was at the head of the United Irish national directory, and Downshire.

== Continental informer ==
To Downshire, Tuner offered to tell all he knew of the United Irish naming 22 or 23 of "the principal and active leaders" in the United Irish directory in the opening months of 1797. Though he had joined the democratic movement from patriotic motives he explained that he now saw that "the object of the papists was the ruin and destruction of the country and the establishment of a tyranny far worse than what was complained of by the reformers". Money was also a consideration. He wrote to Downshire asking if "Mr Pitt [the British Prime Minister] may let me have a cool five-hundred". In mid-November 1797 Turner returned to Hamburg as a double agent.

Turner travelled back and forth between Hamburg, London and Paris. Through Downshire he kept the British government informed of communications between the United Irish leadership in Dublin and both its agents on the Continent and the French government. He had a hand in the arrests in England in March 1798 of James Coigly and Arthur O'Connor. Coigly (who was subsequently executed) had been seeking to coordinate rebellion in Ireland with French cross-Channel landings and insurrection by jacobins ("United Britons") in London and the mill districts of northern England.

In Paris. following the defeat of the 1798 rebellion in Ireland, Tuner exacerbated the division among the Irish exiles in Paris by supporting James Napper Tandy against Edward Lewines, and in a letter of 16 August 1798 informed London of preparations for three French military expeditions to Ireland. In Hamburg played a part in the arrest in November 1798 of Tandy (returned from his aborted landing in Ireland), James Bartholomew Blackwell, William Corbet and Hervey Montmorency Morres.

Turner stayed on intermittently in Hamburg supplying information on the efforts of exiles to reconstitute the movement. Late in the summer of 1802; he made for Paris, where (by his own account) he aroused some suspicion among fellow Irishmen and was imprisoned for nine weeks and then detained on parole for eight months. On the news of his father's death, and with hopes of renewing of the United Irish struggle blasted in the debacle of Emmet's July rising in Dublin, in August 1803 Turner returned to Ireland.

== Later life ==
Turner was included in the act of attainder in 1798 and appeared at the bar of the king's bench, when the attainder was reversed, with the assent of the attorney-general, on proof of Turner's absence from Ireland for upwards of a year prior to the outbreak of the insurrection.

He lived quietly in Dublin, his address appearing in the list of barristers in Wilson's directory as Stephen's Green (1804–10). Suspicion of his perfidy did not become widespread until the publication of the memoirs of James Hope in the third series of R. R. Madden's United Irishmen (1846).

The Irish historian William John Fitzpatrick was told by a correspondent in Newry that Samuel Turner was killed about 1810 in a duel on the Isle of Man with a certain Boyce. But no evidence has been found for this or for any wife or children he may have had.
