= James Bartholomew Blackwell =

Irish born mercenary and French Army officer

- Born: 1763; Barrack Street, Ennis, County Clare; Kingdom of Ireland
- Died: 1820 (aged 56–57); Paris, France
- Burial place: Père Lachaise Cemetery
- Relatives: Uncle: Dr Bartholomew Murray
- Military career
- Allegiance: United Irishmen; Kingdom of France; French First Republic; First French Empire
- Service years: 1784–1806
- Rank: Chef de brigade
- Unit: Irish Legion
- Conflicts: French Revolution; Storming of the Bastille; Irish Rebellion of 1798
- Other work: Governor

James Bartholomew Blackwell (1763–1820) was an Irish officer in the service of France who received commissions from Louis XVI, the French First Republic and later Emperor Napoleon. A friend of Georges Danton, Camille Desmoulins, he had taken part in the storming of the Bastille in July 1789. Following service in defence of the Republic, at the behest of United Irish emissaries he twice sailed for Ireland: in advance of the Rebellion of 1798 with General Hoche in December 1796, and with Napper Tandy in September 1798. Following this second aborted expedition, he was interned in Hamburg and extradited to Ireland. The Peace of Amiens secured his release at the end of 1802. He returned to French service rising to the rank of Chef de bataillon.

== Education ==
James Bartholomew Blackwell was born on Barrack Street in Ennis, County Clare, Ireland. Records of his year of birth vary between 1763 and 1765. He was closely related to Dr Bartholomew Murray, who died in Paris on 8 January 1767. Dr Murray had been a generous benefactor of the Irish College in Paris, and in his will left further rich bequests towards the education of Irish students destined for the priesthood to serve on the mission in Ireland. At the age of eleven, James left Ennis for Paris, and there he entered the Collège des Lombards on the burse founded by his late granduncle, Dr. Murray, and he began his ecclesiastical studies.

At this time there were approximately 600 Irish students, secular and regular, studying for the priesthood in thirty colleges throughout Europe. Of this number, France accounted for over a half and Paris one third. Liam Swords informs us that: "Numerically [the two Irish colleges in Paris] represented the largest concentration of Irish in the city and, more importantly, all the other Irish were in one way or another linked with them and regarded them as the focus of Irish society." About 11,000 Irish students were educated in Paris in the seventeenth and eighteenth centuries, equaling the number of priests ordained in Maynooth during the two centuries of its existence to date. Lecky observed that they returned to Ireland 'with a real and varied knowledge of the world ... the manners and feelings of cultivated gentlemen and a high sense of clerical decorum.'

Both the universities and students alike suffered from continuing financial problems. Correspondence during the decade preceding the French Revolution gives the impression of an academic world deeply concerned about the number of prizes the Irish were awarded each year. Dr Plunkett explained that a student 'will be received gratis as soon as he shall win a premium in the university. Should this happen the first year he will have nothing to pay during the course of his studies.' "Irish Catholics," Swords writes, "or at least the strong farmers and well-off shopkeepers who insisted on sending their sons to Paris to be educated – were very loath to pay for them. Dr Charles Kearney, who became superior of the Collège des Irlandais in 1782, complained that often they sent their sons of thirteen or fourteen years of age with only one half-term or quarter-term's fee and that nothing ever followed despite frequent solicitations." Some scholars' financial destitution is further illustrated when, in 1789, Henry Essex Edgeworth wrote to his friend bishop Francis Moylan of Cork on behalf of one Fitzgerald, a medical student who was obliged to borrow five guineas, to persuade his father to send him money to pay his debts and return fare home. Thus it was in a sense liberating for James Blackwell to be a recipient of a burse, and evidence exists supporting the claim that he was in fact a privileged bursary-holder.

At 8 am on 29 October 1792 the two deputies who had been authorised to supervise the election of a new administrator by the students arrived at Collège des Irlandais and called upon Truchon, substitute procurator of the Commune, to join them.

We assembled all the young Irish bursary-holders of the said establishment in the chapel, we read to them there out loud article 8 of the rules of the establishment and in pursuance of the said article obtained from them the prescribed oath, by which they swore to elect, according to their conscience, the most suitable persons, swayed neither by personal interest nor solicitation and we then proceeded to the nomination of a Provisor-Superior, by means of a ballot. There were nine voters present: Murray, Duckett, Mac Sheehi senior, Mac Sheehi junior, Curtayne, B. Blackwell,, J Oneill, Ferris, MacMahon…

Also, an undated document lists Major Blackwell as an individual in receipt of monies from college revenues.

The Revolution and subsequent wars caused the closing of the college and the sequestration of the burses. When John Baptist Walsh reopened the college after the Treaty of Amiens (1802), instead of founding bursaries 'which experience had taught him, proved of little value to the Irish mission', he devised what he called 'annual pensions of encouragement.'

Shortly after entering Collège des Lombards however, Blackwell discovered that he had no vocation to the priesthood, and we find him studying medicine at the Bicêtre Hospital. "Irishmen were particularly strong in the medical faculty," Swords informs us. "[They] also achieved prominence in court circles: John MacSheehy and John O'Reilly were both physicians to Louis XVI. As well as theology and law, medicine and surgery could be studied by burse-holders in the Irish college and Irish doctors had established a number of substantial foundations there expressly for these disciplines."

== Military career ==
The officers serving in the Irish regiments in the French army were the other Irish community of significance that sought the services of the Irish colleges. General Count Daniel O'Connell and Charles Edward Jennings de Kilmaine, later General Kilmaine, were among the many officers for whom the Irish college issued certificates. "Many of the students who entered the Irish college at a tender age did not persevere to the priesthood and some opted for a military career," Swords continues. Presumably this is what happened to James Blackwell as in 1786 he subsequently joined the Regiment de Walsh, part of the Irish Brigade (France) in the French army, becoming, at the same time, a naturalized citizen of his adopted country, a fact that undoubtedly saved his life later on. He remained with this regiment until it was finally disbanded in 1791.

== The French Revolution ==
According to the Irish historian Richard Hayes (politician), "Before the outbreak of the Revolution, Blackwell had associated himself with the reform party, becoming an intimate friend of Georges Danton, Camille Desmoulins and the other leading spirits of the clubs who helped to precipitate the insurrection of the fourteenth of July 1789."

On that morning twelve cannons and 40,000 muskets were seized from Les Invalides for the new militia. The Bastille, a state prison, containing a sizeable quantity of ammunition, including 250 barrels of powder, too, posed an irresistible temptation for the militant-minded of the revolutionaries. In the popular mind, the Bastille was conceived as a symbol of royal despotism, as attested to by Eoghan O Néill's comment: 'Whatever the designs of the founders the use of it is in the end a disgrace to any nation.' Hayes relates that: "Early on that day a section of the Faubourg Saint Antoine – a district noted as the nursery of Paris revolutions – chose James Bartholomew Blackwell as their leader for the attack on the Bastille." When the attackers reached the Bastille that morning this contingent was the first to move against the formidable fortress with its 30-metre-high (98 ft) walls, its turrets and its mounted cannon. "The taking of the Bastille constituted the first great journée of the French Revolution, marking the collapse of absolute monarchy. It resulted in 98 killed, including the governor, 73 wounded, seven freed and several unemployed." James Bartholomew Blackwell's name, however, is absent from the official list of heroes, les vainqueurs de la Bastille consisting of 863 other signatures. His unit was also stationed on the island of Mauritius in the Indian Ocean at the time.

== Hussards Braconniers, or Poacher Hussars ==
When the Regiment de Walsh disbanded in 1791 Blackwell became a captain in the Hussards Braconniers, or Poacher Hussars, an irregular cavalry corps raised by Jean Landrieux 'who placed it at the disposal of the Jacobin committees that were then relentlessly pursuing the proscribed nobles as traitors to France.' This corps was raised to the official status of the Twenty-first Cavalry Regiment in 1793 and became part of the Army of the North commanded by Charles Francois Dumouriez. On 20 September they won a decisive victory over the Prussians in the Battle of Valmy. On the same day, the National Convention met for the first time in the Tuileries Palace and its first act was to abolish the monarchy. They also won a decisive victory over the Austrians in the Battle of Jemappes on 6 November, 'which placed the country at their mercy and made clear their intentions of carrying their revolution abroad.' During this campaign Joachim Murat, who afterwards became a Marshal of France and King of Naples, served as a lieutenant under Blackwell. Murat too, had been intended for the priesthood.

Captain Blackwell was also, at this time, one of the Irish 'rebel' students who personally presented the petition denouncing his superiors at a sitting of the convention on 2 December 1792. On 29 October, during the month between the two above engagements, Blackwell was present at Collège des Irlandais committed to the student election there. The purpose of this election was to appoint a new administrator in the place of Kearney against whom the commissioners of the Commune made a report and the municipality dismissed.

Blackwell and his peers denounced Kearney to the Committee of Public Safety, accusing him of encouraging the students to join the army of the Princes and of giving them money and letters of recommendation for that purpose; of receiving refractory priests, giving them food and lodgings, allowing them to preach against the constitution and 'poison the minds of the students with aristocratic maxims' and permitting ordinations by refractory bishops; of misappropriating and squandering college revenues, running the college into debt, reducing the bursary-holders to destitution and failing to present accounts; and finally of receiving and harbouring the property of émigrés.

Swords suggests that: "It was probably Madgett who advised the rebels to appeal the decision to restore Kearney to the National Convention [and that] in this they were supported by two deputies, Santhonax and Léonard-Bourdon." The latter was a deputy at the National Convention where he always voted for extreme measures. He took a special interest in the Irish colleges on which he seemed particularly well informed.

== Marriage, and The Terror ==
It was at this time that Blackwell met Sophie Wade, an Englishwoman, and was instrumental in rescuing her and her father, Colonel Wade of Somersetshire, from the horrors of a trial before a Revolutionary Tribunal presided over by the well-known Jacobin Jean Bon Saint-André. During the height of the Reign of Terror in 1794, being of English nationality, they were imprisoned at Arras for several months. At a meeting of the Council of that town in July 1794, Blackwell, accompanied by a few of his comrades insisted on their immediate acquittal. Miss Wade and James Blackwell were married soon after.

Hayes suggests that: "Some time after, Murat began to pay his respects rather too ostentatiously to Madame Blackwell, and this led to a duel between the two officers." Consequently, divisions occurred among the other officers of the regiment. Of them one party, led by Murat, attacked both Blackwell and Landrieux on the basis that although Blackwell had been placed in the original Poacher Hussars as Surgeon-Major, Landrieux had promoted him to a captaincy out of friendship alone. "But subsequently," Hayes continues, "at the height of the Terror, when Murat was in danger from his enemies, who tried to bring him under the Law of Suspects by proving that he was of aristocratic lineage, Blackwell sheltered him from their fury and saved his life. And when Murat was seeking to be appointed Commander of the new Cavalry Guard of the Directory of Paris, a memorial was drawn up by the officers of the regiment, which, headed by Blackwell's name as Captain, recommended him for the post by reason of his ability, courage and patriotism."

In an unrelated incident, a United Irish agent, Father James Coigly, having in April 1797 come under suspicion from the authorities in Paris, described it as his "good fortune" to meet with Blackwell "an old college companion, now an officer of distinction in the regular forces." Later, while awaiting execution in England, he wrote of his debt to Blackwell: "He became my security and protected me [and] offered likewise to procure me employment as a priest.''

Blackwell, having participated in the first insurrection of the Revolution in July 1789, fittingly played a dramatic role in the final insurrection of October 1795. Abetted by Royalist intrigues, 20,000 insurgents in the streets of Paris threatened the National Convention which had only 4,000 troops at its command. By order of Napoleon Bonaparte, Murat, now Commander of the Cavalry Guard of the Directory, and Blackwell, made a midnight dash with the Twenty-First Cavalry Regiment and a troop of 300 horse to the park of Les Sablons on the outskirts of the city where the insurgents' artillery was stored. They succeeded in seizing this artillery and thus saved the convention.

== General Hoche & the 1796 Expedition ==
The following year Blackwell, holding the rank of Colonel, accompanied Theobald Wolfe Tone on Lazare Hoche's expedition to Bantry Bay. Leaving Brest on 16 December this consisted of 43 sail, 14,450 troops, 41,644 stand of arms, a supply of green cockades and 5,000 uniforms taken from the royalists at Quiberon, which, by an ironic turn of fate, were about to be used against the country which had supplied them. General Hédouville remained behind with orders to prepare immediately a reinforcement of 14–15,000 men, a squadron of cavalry and as much artillery as possible.

Previous to this expedition 'a secret report in the Irish State Paper Office, sent by an English agent in France, gives Blackwell's name among the "Irish officers who are about to accompany General Hoche in his projected expedition to Ireland"; in another document, in the same office his name is included in "a list of suspects," with a personal description attached; while in still another we find Count Walsh de Serrant, a former officer of the Irish Brigade (French), who was a strong anti-Revolutionary, playing the part of the informer to the English government against Colonel Blackwell. "I do not know," he writes to the Lord Lieutenant of the day, "any man named Blackwell having been in the Irish Brigade – but there is a man of the name in the service of the Republic. Before the Revolution, he was a student of medicine in Paris… I am assured he has much esprit."'

The expedition was a complete fiasco. Thick fog dispersed the fleet on the first night and the frigate carrying both Justin Bonaventure Morard de Galles and Hoche was separated. The main fleet arrived in Bantry Bay during a snowstorm on 21 December, 16 ships entering the bay and 19 standing outside, but there was still no sign of their commander. Indecision and continuing disadvantageous weather provoked the fleet to return to Brest five days later. Hoche arrived at Bantry four days after the fleet's departure, but on 31 December he too returned to France.

== Tandy's expedition and the 1798 Rebellion ==
Due to the insistence of Wolfe Tone, another French expedition was sent to Ireland in 1798. On this expedition, an independent mission was assigned to James Napper Tandy. He was put in charge of the Anacreon, one of the fastest sailing corvettes in the French Navy, to rush stores to Jean Joseph Amable Humbert's forces and those Irish expected to flock to his standard. Tandy chose his staff from among those who sided with him in the split with Tone's party. Preparations for the voyage frequently brought Tandy to Paris, and as he had no fixed abode in the city he frequented the house of Colonel James Blackwell. A warm friendship sprang up between Blackwell's wife and Tandy. She is referred to in his correspondence as "my much esteemed and amiable Friend, Mrs. Blackwell." On one such visit in August Colonel Blackwell, Tandy's adjutant-general, introduced a young Irishman, named Murphy to him. The man proved to be a spy. Also on board the Anacreon was George Orr. Formerly a reporter of parliamentary debates for the Morning Post and a tailor by trade, he too was a spy, code name Smith. Dunkirk was a town known to be infested with spies, and the British Government were well informed on the expedition's developments. At 4 pm on Tuesday, 4 September 1798, the Anacreon left Dunkirk for Ireland.

A council of war was held on receiving the intelligence of Humbert's defeat. Generals Tandy and Rey were against disembarkation. The order to evacuate was, therefore, given. This was opposed by the spies Orr and Murphy who according to Rupert J. Coughlan, "…begged to be allowed to take to the mountains for the purpose of fostering the cause of liberty and preparing the people for the arrival of General Hardy's expedition that was to follow." Murphy claims that in response to this Colonel Blackwell would have killed them had Napper Tandy not intervened.

The spy Orr alleges that, having been a member of the landing party, Tandy was carried back to the ship from the mainland in advanced stages of intoxication. Peter Perry, one of Colonel Blackwell's Bow Street escorts from Sheerness to London the following year, declared that his prisoner had stated that Napper Tandy got so drunk ashore that he (Blackwell) "was obliged to have him brought on board on the men's shoulders." Perry's colleague, Thomas Dowsett, corroborated this by reporting that Blackwell said that the conduct of the expedition fell chiefly on him as "N. Tandy was always drunk and incapable of acting." Supposedly Blackwell also told William Ross, the king's messenger, that he was forced to assume the responsibility of the expedition, as Tandy was a 'poor lost creature that could do nothing.' Orr also claimed that Blackwell had Tandy "in leading strings" and consequently Tandy was compelled to give Blackwell the rank of adjutant-general and next that of general of brigade.

In fact, had Tandy been incapable he could not have prevented Blackwell from killing Murphy for disputing the re-embarkation order; the total absence from the ship amounted to less than six hours in all, with much needing to be done during that brief period their itinerary could not afford a visit to the island inn; Blackwell was an experienced professional soldier with a thorough knowledge of the language, Napper Tandy, in the circumstances, was obliged to place more than usual reliance on him – hence the 'leading strings' allegation; and lastly, the post of adjutant-general is an office and not a rank. Orr also wrongly accused Blackwell of being only a captain when, in fact, he was a colonel, and as the documents show, so styled himself.

Realising that his chances of returning to France direct were slim Tandy gave orders for the course to be set for the North Cape of Norway. By 5 pm, on Friday, 21 September, they entered Bergen harbour. When the question of the Anacreon's next move came up, Captain Blankmann consented to commute the general officers back to Dunkirk. Tandy and Blackwell did not accompany them, however. As it was considered too risky, the French consul arranged that they should travel overland and under assumed names. Thus it was that two American merchants, Mr. Jones of Philadelphia (Napper Tandy) and his companion, Mr. Bleifest (Colonel Blackwell), set out for France, on 2 October 1798.

They arrived in the city of Hamburg on the evening of 22 November. There they took rooms at the Wappen von Amerika (American Arms), where William Corbet and Harvey Montmorency Morres soon joined them. On the following evening, Tandy recounts, "I was invited to sup… by Messrs. T…& D… in a house where Blackwell, Corbet and Morres supped also; we remained there until midnight, and at four o'clock went to our hotel." The initials stand for the names of Samuel Turner, and either Duckett or Durnin. Their hostess was Lady Pamela; widow of Lord Edward Fitzgerald, who had retired to Hamburg after the latter's death.

== Betrayal and imprisonment ==
It appears that Turner then betrayed his friends, and provided the authorities with the necessary information on the Irish fugitives, even down to the location of the victims' rooms. Paul Weber presumes that only Tandy and Blackwell offered active resistance to the ensuing arrest: "Blackwell vehemently complained about this violent intrusion on his rights as a French officer, but his furious protests were to no avail." Corbet too demanded to know on whose authority the soldiers acted? Weber informs us that among the letters found upon Blackwell's person, there is one unfinished, the completion of which appears to have been prematurely prevented during those early hours of the twenty-fourth: "He must have left Lady Pamela's home in a state of emotional confusion" and, influenced by "a guilty conscience, wrote, 'there, dear Madam, let us have none affliction in the common of two.' Blackwell was obviously at pains to reason his female addressee out of a liaison, the beginnings of which had left him utterly bewildered." To all appearances, Weber speculates, the supper party did not stop at political talks.

Tandy described the initial prison conditions as appalling. However, English-speaking studies into the circumstances of their detention fail to take account of the prisoners' papers in the Hamburger Staatsarchiv, thus giving unrestricted credit to the showmanship of Corbet and Tandy on whose descriptions most studies are based. Blackwell's own letters from Hamburg paint much more comfortable accommodations, thanking Hamburg authorities for wine and money sent to him in his cell.

Blackwell spent most of his time in the dungeons of the police station near the Gänsemarkt. There, he wrote a number of letters to various French authorities in Germany and France, all designed to draw attention to the situation of the Irish prisoners. In a pretentious and often French-coloured style of writing Blackwell never failed to express his loyalty to the Revolution, let alone the great services he claimed to have rendered in France. He presented himself always in a favourable light. Weber writes: "The distinguishing feature of his letters is the intrepid persistence with which he maintained his political convictions, and yet, one simply cannot avoid being filled with wonder in the face of Blackwell's eccentric patriotism."

The Senate began to improve conditions for Blackwell towards the end of 1798. At their meeting on 24 November, the removal of the captives' chains was ordered, and for Blackwell, a teacher of German was procured. Nevertheless, the deprivations of his confinement started to wear him down, and by the summer of 1799, he seemed to be at the end of his tether.

== Extradition to Ireland ==
During the early hours of the morning on Tuesday, 1 October 1799, the prisoners were delivered to His Majesty's Government, via the sloop Xenophen. Adverse winds, however, prevented their departure from the German coast until 12 October. Whitehall notified Dublin, on 18 October, that the extradited prisoners were daily expected in England, and, "as soon as the necessary examinations are taken", would be sent to Ireland. William Ross, the king's messenger, and a number of Bow Street officers, in two post-coaches-and-four, escorted the prisoners to Sheerness. Napper Tandy and Morres travelled in one coach with Ross, while Blackwell and Corbet were in charge of Thomas Dowsett in the other. Having been lodged in Newgate Prison, on a charge of high treason until 9 November, they were again delivered unto Ross and his assistants for escort to Ireland. Apparently, Ross was well disposed towards his charges as they addressed their expressed appreciation of his consideration the day after being committed in Dublin. Colonel Blackwell was committed by order of the privy council, and charged with treasonable practices.

Conditions, in Kilmainham Gaol, were good. However the situation of food soon came up in a complaint by Colonel Blackwell to the lord lieutenant. But at least two of Blackwell's comrades did not share his criticism. Blackwell is noted to have become increasingly discontented, and quarrelled violently with his colleagues. During routine exercise, he often acted offensively to Tandy, Morres and Corbet, or they to him. Consequently, he was given the option of joining those prisoners who had a general mess, or having a yard of his own in which to exercise. He chose to join the prisoners and was temporarily content. Having complained about the food and quarrelled with his colleagues to the extent that he would not dine with them; Dr. Trevor now discovered Blackwell eating as heartily as any other prisoner. Soon, however, he required his food to be routinely inspected. Complicating this disposition, Blackwell was the victim of what appeared to be an epileptic fit. Despite all of this it was proposed that all four be brought together again.

== Release ==
In March 1800 Blackwell propositioned the English government with the possibility of an exchange for some British officer of equal rank held by France. The following year he pleaded that his position was different from the others in that he became a naturalised French citizen in 1784 and had fifteen years army service. His wife, too, interceded for him on this matter, writing to the Irish Attorney-General pleading this case. Colonel James Blackwell was released, without trial, on 11 December 1802 after the Treaty of Amiens came into effect.

== The Irish Legion ==
General Humbert, then commandant of Brest, estimated in a mémoire to the Minister of War on 8 October 1800 that the number of Irish who had taken refuge in France after the failure of the French expeditions was between 1,000 and 1,500, and proposed their absorption into an Irish legion. The old Irish brigade had been disbanded at the beginning of the revolution. In 1803, however, war was resumed with England and Napoleon turned his attention to re-organising the military. On 13 August Napoleon signed a decree at Saint-Cloud for the formation of an Irish battalion. The colonel of the battalion, 'named by the first consul', was the now 43-year-old James Bartholomew Blackwell. However, John G. Gallaher argues that: "Despite his title and rank, it was not Blackwell, but MacSheehy, who ran the Irish Legion. MacSheehy issued the orders of the day, secured promotions for the men, communicated with army headquarters, and made all serious decisions affecting the battalion."

On 3 June 1804, the Council of Administration of the Legion was assembled to take the new oath to Napoleon who had been proclaimed emperor on 10 May. They also had to sign a report (the Procés Verbal) that declared that all the officers and men of the Legion had taken the oath. However Captain Thomas Corbett provoked trouble by declaring that he could not sign a document he knew to be false. Similarly, Captain Sweeney questioned whether the oath lessened in any way their Irish loyalty. Blackwell, who had signed the Procès Verbal, wrote to MacSheehy on the 6th saying that he "was of the same opinion as the other two members", and that he wished to retract his signature from the document. MacSheehy recommended the removal from the Legion of Blackwell "for his feeble debauchery" and it consequently cost Blackwell his command.

== Military campaigns and later years ==
He then rejoined the main French army and served in the cavalry corps in the Prussian and Austrian campaigns of Napoleon. In the year 1806, when the Irish legion was based at Boulogne-sur-Mer prior to their departure for the Spanish campaign, Blackwell was advancing on Warsaw in an effort to crush what remained of Prussian resistance. In 1810 we find him styled "Major General in the Grand Army, 7th Corps, Officer of the Légion d'honneur, Chevalier of the Empire, Chief of Squadron". On 29 January 1812, Blackwell in an Order headed "Napoleon, Emperor of France, King of Italy, Protector of the Confederation of the Rhine, and Mediator of the Swiss Confederation" was confirmed in the rank of Chef de bataillon. It is also possible that he participated in the Russian Campaign, and was probably wounded, for an Order dated September 1813 appoints him Commander of the town of Bitche in Northeast France (Alsace) "when his period of convalescence would have expired". Hayes speculates that "ill health, as a result of his wounds, compelled him to give up this office after a few months, and [that] he returned to Paris to die".

However we find, in the Blackwell papers in the National Library of Ireland that, in August 1816, by Royal Ordinance dated 24 July of that same year, Jacques Bartholomew Blackwell, Chef d'Escadron, was appointed Governor of La Petite Pierre. A document issued, in July 1819, from the Grand Chancellor of the Legion of Honour, to M. Blackwell, Chef d'Escadron, Lieutenant of the King, resident in Faubourg Saint Germaine, is the last we hear of James Bartholomew Blackwell. This document confirms him as Brevet-Officer of the Royal Order of the Legion of Honour, which would bring with it a yearly payment of 20 francs. According to the records of the Pere Lachaise Cemetery in Paris, Blackwell died and was interred there in 1820.
