= Sir Henry Bellingham, 1st Baronet =

English lawyer and politician

Sir Henry Bellingham, 1st Baronet (d. October 1650) was an English lawyer and politician who sat in the House of Commons from 1625 to 1626. He supported the Royalist cause in the English Civil War.

Bellingham was the son of Sir James Bellingham and his wife Agnes Curwen, daughter of Sir Henry Curwen. He was educated at Queens' College, Cambridge in 1609, and admitted to the Middle Temple a year later. On 30 May 1620, he was created a baronet, of Hilsington, in the County of Westmorland by King James I of England. He was a member of parliament (MP) for Westmorland from 1625 until 1626 and again in the Long Parliament from 1640 until 1645.

Bellingham married Dorothy Boynton, daughter of Sir Francis Boynton. They had seven children, three surviving daughters and a son, James, who succeeded in the baronetcy, but died two weeks after his father.

Parliament of England
Preceded by Sir John Lowther; Robert Strickland	Member of Parliament for Westmorland; 1625–1626; With: Sir John Lowther	Succeeded by Sir John Lowther; Sir John Lowther, Bt
Baronetage of England
New creation	Baronet (of Hilsington); 1620–1650	Succeeded by James Bellingham
