= James Bellingham =

English politician, lawyer and baronet

Sir James Bellingham, 2nd Baronet (8 September 1623 – 26 October 1650) was an English politician, lawyer and baronet.

== Early life ==
He was the only son of Sir Henry Bellingham, 1st Baronet and Dorothy Boynton, daughter of Sir Francis Boynton.

== Career ==
After being called to the bar at Gray's Inn, Bellingham was a member of parliament (MP) for Westmorland in the Long Parliament from 1646 until 1648.

== Personal life ==
Bellingham married Catherine Willoughby, daughter of Sir Henry Willoughby, 1st Baronet. Their marriage was childless. In 1650, having succeeded his father as baronet, Bellingham himself died two weeks later, aged only 27. With his death the baronetcy became extinct.

Baronetage of England
Preceded by Henry Bellingham	Baronet (of Hilsington); October 1650	Extinct
