= John Binns (Irish politician) =

Irish politician

John Binns (died 1804) was an Irish Patriot politician and a member of Dublin Corporation.

Binns was a wholesale silk merchant of Dame Street, Dublin, working in partnership with William Cope. Both Binns and Cope became members of Dublin Corporation as representatives of the Guild of Merchants alongside such notable figures as James Napper Tandy and Lundy Foot, but whereas Cope's initial support for reformist opposition politics gave way to a strong reaction against Catholic emancipation, Binns allied with Tandy to push for radical reform of the Irish political system and they organised an assembly of Volunteers to lobby for Catholic emancipation in 1784. The same year, the Freeman's Journal reported an entirely fictitious plot by the Hell Fire Club to bring general chaos and lawlessness to Ireland, supposedly signed by “J. N. T__dy, Secretary” and “J__n B__ns, Treasurer”. A tall man, Binns was known to reformers as 'Long John Binns', but to government supporters as 'the devil's darning needle'.

Binns, Tandy and Cope were all heavily involved in the financing of the Royal Canal and served on its board of directors, and Binns had bridges over both the Grand Canal and the Royal Canal named in his honour. Cope also had a bridge named after him. Tandy was forced to flee Ireland in 1793 due to his involvement with the revolutionary Society of United Irishmen, while Cope became a paid government spy against the same organisation. However, the Royal Canal project became severely indebted and both Binns and Cope were dismissed from the board in 1802. Financially ruined, John Binns died in 1804.

His brother, Jonathan Binns, was the father of thirty two children and the grandfather of United Irishman agitator turned American journalist John Binns.
