= William Corbet =

William Corbet (17 August 1779 – 12 August 1842) was an Anglo-Irish soldier in the service of France. In September 1798 he accompanied Napper Tandy in an aborted French mission to Ireland in support of the United Irish insurrection. After two years of incarceration, he escaped from Ireland and served in the campaigns of Napoleon reaching the rank of colonel. In 1831, under the July Monarchy, he was employed in the French expedition to Greece. He returned to France in 1837, retiring with the rank of Major-General.

== Ireland and the 1798 Rebellion ==
He was born in Ballythomas, County Cork as a branch of the Corbet family an Anglo-Irish Protestant family. In 1798, as a member of the United Irishmen, he was expelled from Trinity College Dublin with Robert Emmet and others for treasonable activities, and went instead to Paris. In September of the same year, he joined a French military force under Napper Tandy with the rank of Captain and sailed from Dunkirk with arms and ammunition for Ireland. The expedition had to turn back following the defeat of General Humbert and arriving in Hamburg they were handed over to the British authorities and taken to Ireland, where they were imprisoned in Kilmainham Gaol.

== Service under Napoleon ==
Corbet escaped in 1803 and returned to France. He was appointed professor of English at the military college of St Cyr. Later that year he became a captain in the Irish Legion. Following the death of his brother Thomas (who was also in the Legion) in a duel with another officer, he was transferred to the 70th Regiment of the line, where he served in Massena's expedition to Portugal, and distinguished himself in the retreat from Torres Vedras and the battle of Sabugal. After the Battle of Salamanca he was appointed chef de bataillon of the 47th regiment and served until 1813 when he was summoned to Germany to join the staff of Marshal Marmont. He served at the battles of Lutzen, Bautzen, Dresden and others and was made a commander of the Legion of Honour. In December 1814, he was naturalised as a French citizen. In 1815, after the abdication of Napoleon he was promoted to colonel and chief of staff to General d'Aumont at Caen.

== Morea expedition ==
In the period of the Bourbon Restoration, his friendship with the opposition leader, General Foy, placed him under some suspicion, but in 1828 he was selected by Marshal Maison to accompany him on an expedition against Ibrahim Pasha in Morea, Greece. After serving as governor of Navarino, Messinia, and Nafplio, he relieved Argos from the attack of Kolocotronis, who was then acting in the interest of Russia and Count Capo d'Istria, and defeated him.

== Last years ==
In 1837 he returned to France where, with the rank of Major-General, he was commander in the region of Calvados. He died at Saint-Denis in 1842.

The Irish novelist Maria Edgeworth based the main theme of her novel Ormond on Corbet's 1803 escape from Kilmainham.
