= James Napper Tandy =

Irish revolutionary (1739–1803)

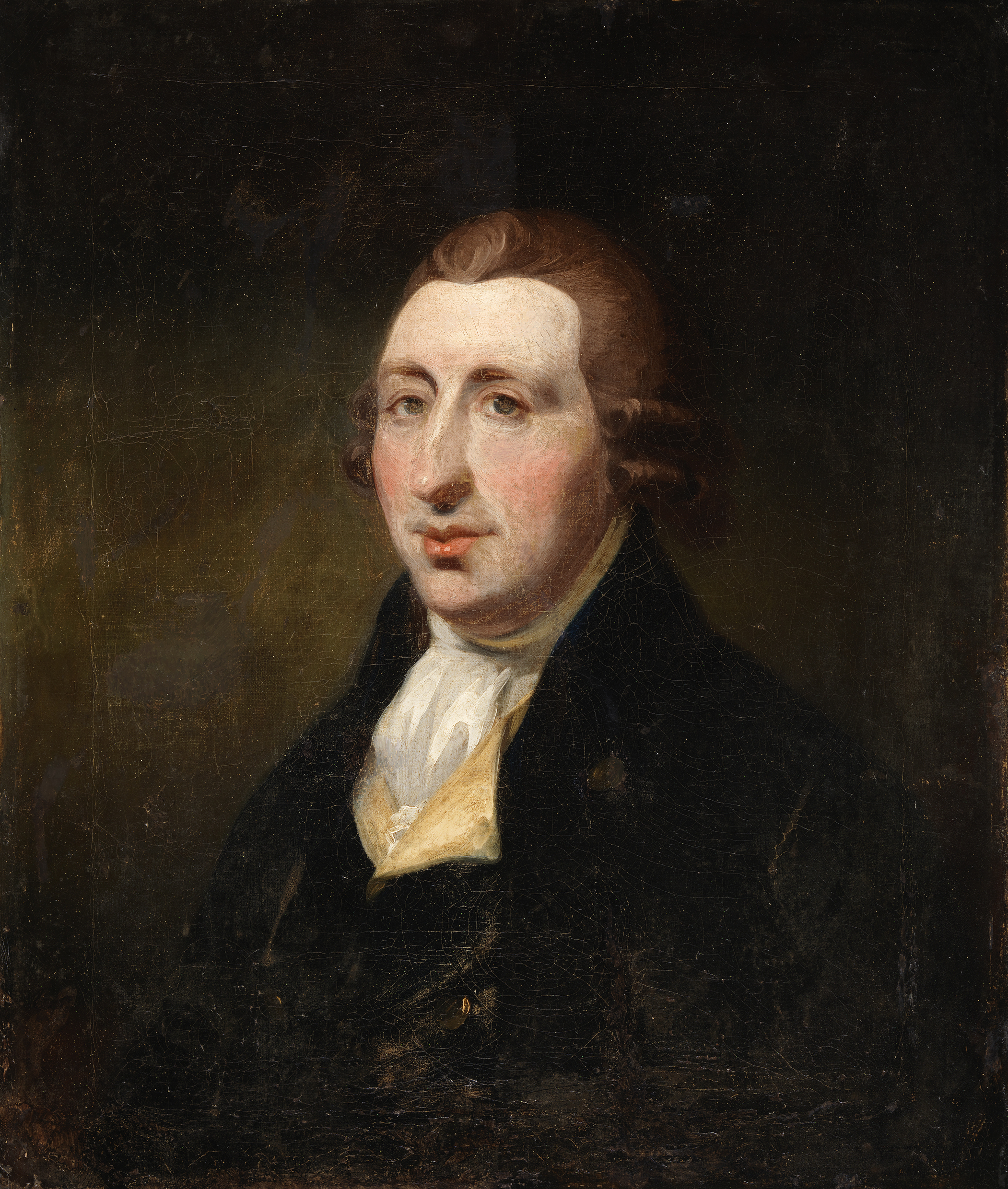
- Portrait of Tandy
- Born: February 1739; Dublin, Ireland
- Died: 24 August 1803 (aged 64); Bordeaux, France
- Resting place: Castlebellingham, County Louth
- Occupations: Soldier, United Irishman, Politician
- Known for: Founder of Society of United Irishmen

James Napper Tandy (February 1739 – 24 August 1803), known as Napper Tandy, was an Irish revolutionary and a founder of the United Irishmen. He experienced exile, first in the United States and then in France, for his role in attempting to advance a republican insurrection in Ireland with French assistance.

== Political activism ==
A Dubliner, a Protestant (Church of Ireland), and the son of an ironmonger, Tandy was baptised (as 'James Naper Tandy') in St. Audoen's Church on 16 February 1739. He went to the famous Quaker boarding school in Ballitore, south Kildare, also attended by Edmund Burke, who was eight years older. He then started life as a small tradesman in Dublin's inner city. He was a churchwarden at St. Audoen's in 1765, and also at another local church (either St. Bride's or St. John's) where he commissioned a new church bell bearing his name, displayed since 1946 on the floor of St. Werburgh's Church.

Turning to politics, he was elected a member of Dublin Corporation representing the Guild of Merchants, and was popular for his denunciation of municipal corruption and his proposal of a boycott of English goods in Ireland in retaliation for the restrictions imposed by the Westminster government on Irish commerce.

In April 1780, Tandy was expelled from the Dublin Volunteers (see Henry Flood) for proposing the expulsion of the Duke of Leinster. He was one of the most conspicuous members of the small revolutionary party, chiefly of the shopkeeper class, that formed a permanent committee in June 1784 to agitate for reform, and called a convention of delegates from all parts of Ireland. This met in October 1784.

Tandy and John Binns persuaded Dublin Corporation to condemn by resolution Pitt's amended commercial resolutions in 1785. He became a member of the Whig Club founded by Henry Grattan, but he identified with its radical faction and actively co-operated with Theobald Wolfe Tone in founding the Society of the United Irishmen in 1791, of which he became the first secretary.

His opinions, strongly influenced by French Revolutionary ideas, now brought Tandy to the notice of the authorities. In February 1792, an allusion in a debate by John Toler, the Attorney General of Ireland, to Tandy's personal ugliness provoked him into sending a challenge to a duel. This was treated by the House of Commons as a breach of a Member's privilege, and a Speaker's warrant was issued for his arrest, which he managed to elude until its validity expired on the prorogation of Parliament. Tandy then took proceedings against the Lord Lieutenant for issuing a proclamation for his arrest; although the action failed, it increased Tandy's popularity, and his expenses were paid by the Society of the United Irishmen.

== Planning a revolution in exile ==
Sympathy with the French Revolution was rapidly spreading in Ireland. A meeting of some 6,000 people in Belfast voted for a congratulatory address to the French nation in July 1791. In the following year, Napper Tandy took a leading part in organising a new military association in Ireland modelled after the French National Guards; they professed republican principles, and on their uniform, the cap of liberty instead of the crown surmounted the Irish harp. Tandy also, with the purpose of bringing about a fusion between the Defenders and the United Irishmen, took the oath of the Defenders, a Roman Catholic society whose agrarian and political violence had been increasing for several years.

He was about to be tried in 1793 for distributing a seditious pamphlet in County Louth when the government found out he had taken the oath of the Defenders. Being threatened with prosecution for this step, and also for libel, he took refuge by changing his Dublin address often. In 1795 he fled to the United States, where he remained until 1798. In February of that year, he went to Paris, where a number of Irish refugees, the most prominent of whom was Wolfe Tone, were assembled, planning rebellion in Ireland to be supported by a French invasion, but quarrelling among themselves over tactics.

== Return to Ireland ==
Tandy accepted the offer of a corvette, (later captured by the British and renamed Anacreon), from the French government and sailed from Dunkirk accompanied by a few United Irishmen, a small force of men and a considerable quantity of arms and ammunition for distribution in Ireland. He arrived at the isle of Arranmore, off the coast of County Donegal, on 16 September 1798.

The locality, however, was sparsely populated and showed little enthusiasm for joining the expedition. Tandy took possession of the village of Rutland, where he hoisted an Irish flag and issued a proclamation; but learning of the defeat of Humbert's expedition, and that Connaught was now subdued, the futility of the enterprise was soon apparent. Tandy sailed his vessel round the north of Scotland to avoid the British fleet. He reached Bergen in safety having brought with him a British ship captured along the way. Tandy then made his way with three or four companions to the free port of Hamburg, where he met a British officer whom he warned to hide from the French agents. A peremptory demand from the British government to detain the fugitives was acceded to despite a counter-threat from the French Directory. In 1799 HMS Xenophon, under Commander George Sayer, brought Tandy and some of his associates back to England as state prisoners.

== Exile ==
On 12 February 1800, Tandy was put on trial at Dublin and was acquitted. He remained in prison in Lifford Jail in County Donegal until April 1801, when he was tried for the treasonable landing on Rutland Island. He pleaded guilty and was sentenced to death but he was reprieved and allowed to go to France. This leniency may have been partly due to doubts as to the legality of the demand for his surrender by the Hamburg authorities. Moreover, Napoleon vigorously intervened on his behalf and is even said to have made Tandy's release a condition of signing the Treaty of Amiens.

Tandy supported the Haitian Revolution and opposed French attempts to suppress it, saying "we are all of the same family, black and white, the work of the same creator".

Notwithstanding his vices and his lack of all solid capacity, there is no reason to suppose that Napper Tandy was dishonest or insincere; and the manner in which his name was introduced in the well-known ballad "The Wearing of the Green" proves that he succeeded in impressing the popular imagination of the rebel party in Ireland. The ballad's second verse starts:

I met with Napper Tandy
and he took me by the hand.
And he said "How's poor old Ireland,
and how does she stand?"

In France, where his release was regarded as a French diplomatic victory, he was received, in March 1802, as a person of distinction; and when he died on 24 August 1803 in Bordeaux, his funeral "was attended by the whole army in the district and an immense concourse of citizens." There are suggestions that Tandy's remains were later exhumed and returned to Ireland, being buried secretly in an unmarked grave at Castlebellingham Parish Church in County Louth (his niece, Anne Tandy, had married into the Bellingham family). His widow was buried at St. Mary's churchyard, Julianstown, County Meath, where an inscription reads: "To the memory of Mrs Ann Tandy, died 25 Dec 1820, widow of James Napper Tandy, Irish Patriot and General French Army. This stone was erected by their son James Napper Tandy whose youthful son was buried here with Thomas Cannon...".
