= Henry Butler (disambiguation) =

Henry Butler was an American jazz and blues pianist.

Henry Butler may also refer to:

- Henry Butler, Lord of Umallia (died 1272), founder of Burrishoole
- Henry Butler (MP) (fl. 1460–1485), member of parliament (MP) for Coventry
- Henry Butler (viol player) (died 1652), English composer and viol player
- Henry Butler, 2nd Earl of Carrick (1746–1813), Irish peer and politician
- Henry G. Butler (1769–1847), magistrate and politician in Newfoundland
- Henry Butler, 13th Viscount Mountgarret (1816–1900)
- Henry Butler (politician) (1821–1885), Tasmanian politician, speaker of the House
- Henry Montagu Butler (1833–1918), English academic
- Henry Butler, 14th Viscount Mountgarret (1844–1912), British aristocrat
- Henry John Butler (1889–1922), Australian aviator
- Henry Butler (hurler) (born 1948), Irish hurler
- Henry N. Butler (born 1954), American economist

== See also ==
- Harry Butler (disambiguation)
- Henry Butler-Johnstone (1809–1879), British politician
- Henry Munro-Butler-Johnstone (1837–1902), British author and Conservative Party politician
