= Castlebridge =

Town in County Wexford, Ireland

Castlebridge Droichead an Chaisleáin
- Town
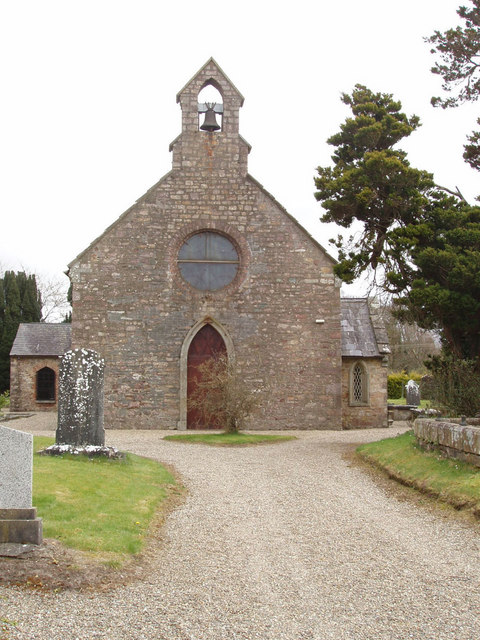
- Ardcolm Church of Ireland church in Castlebridge

- Location in Ireland
- Coordinates: 52°23′00″N 6°27′00″W
- Country: Ireland
- Province: Leinster
- County: County Wexford
- Elevation: 3 m (9.8 ft)

Population (2016)
  - Total: 1,840
- Time zone: UTC+0 (WET)
  - Summer (DST): UTC-1 (IST (WEST))
- Irish Grid Reference: T054269

Castlebridge (Irish: Droichead an Chaisleáin) is a small town in County Wexford, Ireland, around 5 km north of Wexford town. It is just north of Wexford Harbour, on the R741 road. Castlebridge is a rapidly expanding suburb of Wexford Town: its population has almost tripled in 20 years, increasing from 783 in 1996 to a population of 1,840 in 2016.

== History ==
The namesake castle, that originally stood in the town, was dismantled to build buildings such as the Church of Ireland church, which is one of the oldest buildings in Castlebridge. The river that flows through Castlebridge is, contrary to popular belief, actually a canal that replaced the original river. It was dug out by hand to allow sailing cots that loaded up in the various docks of Castlebridge to get to Wexford Town more quickly.

Fr James Dixon, the first Catholic priest permitted to minister in Australia, was born in Castlebridge in 1758.

== Guinness Book of Records ==
Castlebridge is the founding place of the Guinness Book of World Records. On 10 November 1951, Sir Hugh Beaver, then the managing director of the Guinness Breweries, went on a shooting party in the North Slob, by the River Slaney in County Wexford, Ireland. He became involved in an argument over which was the fastest game bird in Europe, the golden plover or the red grouse (the former being correct). That evening at Castlebridge House, he realised that it was impossible to confirm in reference books whether or not the golden plover was Europe's fastest game bird. Beaver knew that there must be numerous other questions debated nightly in pubs throughout Ireland, but there was no book in the world with which to settle arguments about records. He realised then that a book supplying the answers to this sort of question might prove popular.

In 2019, Diageo and the Pattison Group, who own the rights to the Guinness Book of Records, were described as being "really taken" with Castlebridge House, which has been left derelict, with feasibility studies now in operation by Wexford County Council amid interest by Diageo and the Pattison Group to assess the damage and plan for its eventual restoration, which, in collaboration with Diageo and the Pattison Group, is hoped to become a tourist attraction for the home of the Guinness Book of Records. This was further emphasised by the commencement of the first annual Castlebridge Record Makers Family Fun Festival in 2019, with exhibits on the history of the book and its importance to Castlebridge.

== Public transport ==
Wexford Bus operate an hourly service, route 877 "The Bridge Loop", to/from Wexford since February 2019 Mondays to Saturdays inclusive. Bus Éireann route 379 (Wexford - Gorey via Kilmuckridge and Courtown) serves Castlebridge on Mondays and Saturdays.

== Sport ==
The centre of Castlebridge contains a 60x30 foot handball alley. The handball club has produced a number of county and Irish champions and members have competed at World Championships in the United States. Nearby, opposite the Old School (now Castlebridge Community Centre), is the local soccer club, Bridge Rovers FC.

Patrick Breen, who lived in Castlebridge but was originally from Bannow in the south of the county, was the first Wexford person to become President of the Gaelic Athletic Association from 1924 until 1926. He was one of only two Wexford people who headed the Gaelic Athletic Association. He also founded the Irish Handball Council and the past pupils union of St. Peters College. He is buried in Castlebridge cemetery.

== Community ==
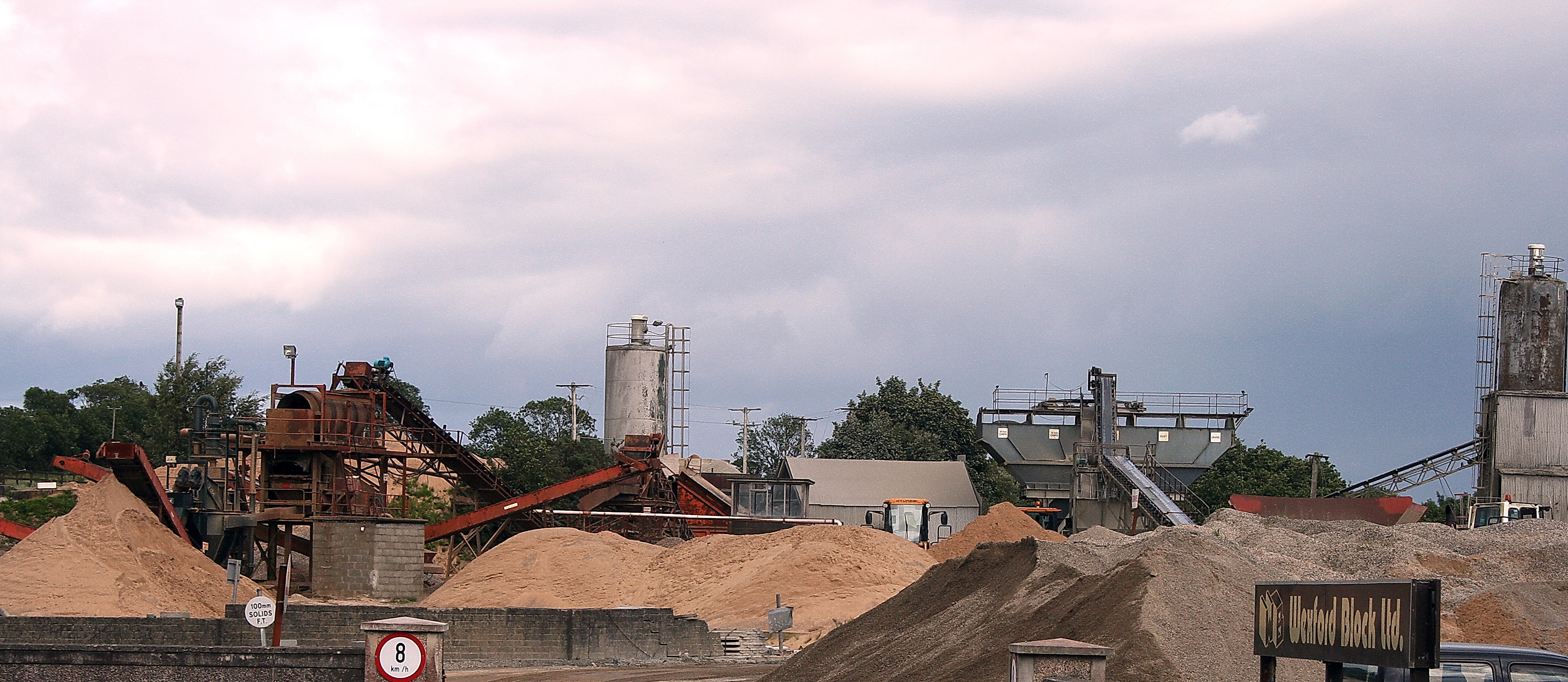
Brick production in Castlebridge

Community groups situated in the area include the Castlebridge Gospel Choir, which was founded in 2003. Local businesses include the Porter House, which was named 'Pub of the Year' in 2017, which has since closed down, several fast food restaurants, a local Londis supermarket, a furniture shop, antiques store and post office.

== See also ==
- List of towns and villages in Ireland
