= Ballywater Wind Farm =

Wind farm in County Wexford, Ireland

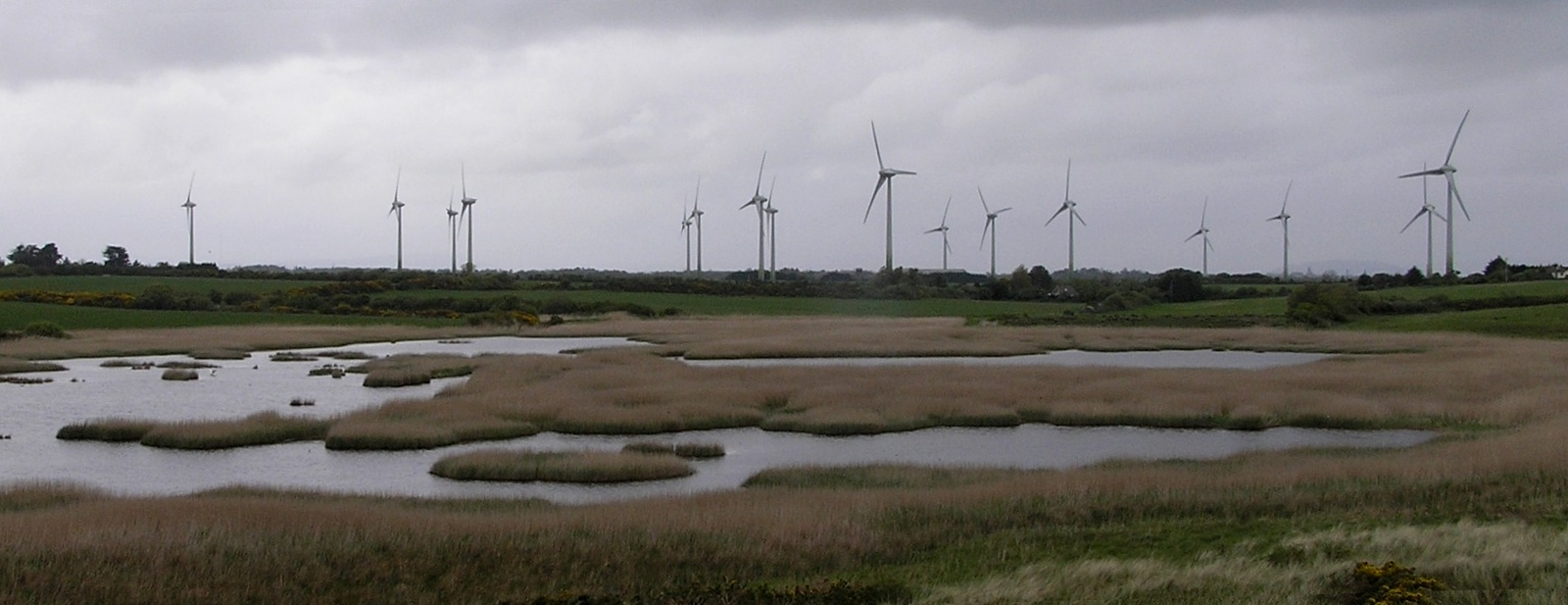
- Ballywater Wind Farm across a salt marsh near Ballinoulart Beach
- Country: Ireland
- Coordinates: 52°32′17″N 6°14′17″W
- Status: Operational
- Commission date: 2005

External links
- Commons: Related media on Commons

The Ballywater Wind Farm is located between the villages of Kilmuckridge and Ballygarrett, in County Wexford, Ireland. The onshore wind farm, which commenced operation in 2005, has a capacity of 42 MW. It consists of 21 wind turbines, and is visible from the R742 regional road.

== Development and sale ==
The wind farm, which commenced operations in 2005, was sold by the Lanber Group to Gaelectric in 2015. In 2018, the Commission for Regulation of Utilities (CRU) conducted an investigation into potential impact on the grid system as, while the wind farm had consent to generate 31.5MW of output, it was reportedly generating 42MW. Following the investigation, the CRU determined that it was "not in the public interest" to take "enforcement" action on the alleged breach of the Electricity Regulation Act, 1999.

== Operation ==
The E-70 turbines, used at the wind farm, are made by Enercon and have rotor diameters of 70 m. The electricity generated by the turbines at the wind farm is fed into the national electricity grid via a sub-station near Monageer, County Wexford.
