= Nicholas Furlong =

Nicholas Furlong may refer to:

- Nicholas Furlong (writer)
- Nicholas Furlong (musician)
