= Kilmuckridge-Tinnaberna Sandhills =

Cliff and dune system in County Wexford, Ireland

- Location within Ireland
- Location: County Wexford, Ireland
- Nearest city: Kilmuckridge
- Coordinates: 52°29′34″N 6°15′39″W
- Website: www.npws.ie/protectedsites/specialareasofconservationsac/kilmuckridge-tinnabernasandhillssac/

The Kilmuckridge-Tinnaberna Sandhills are a system of clay cliffs, sand dunes, wet woodland, and gently undulating fixed dunes, known as sand hills, in County Wexford, Ireland. The area was surveyed and described during the 1990s and was designated a Special Area of Conservation. The site was considered to be the best example of grey dunes for lichen diversity in the country.

== Damage ==
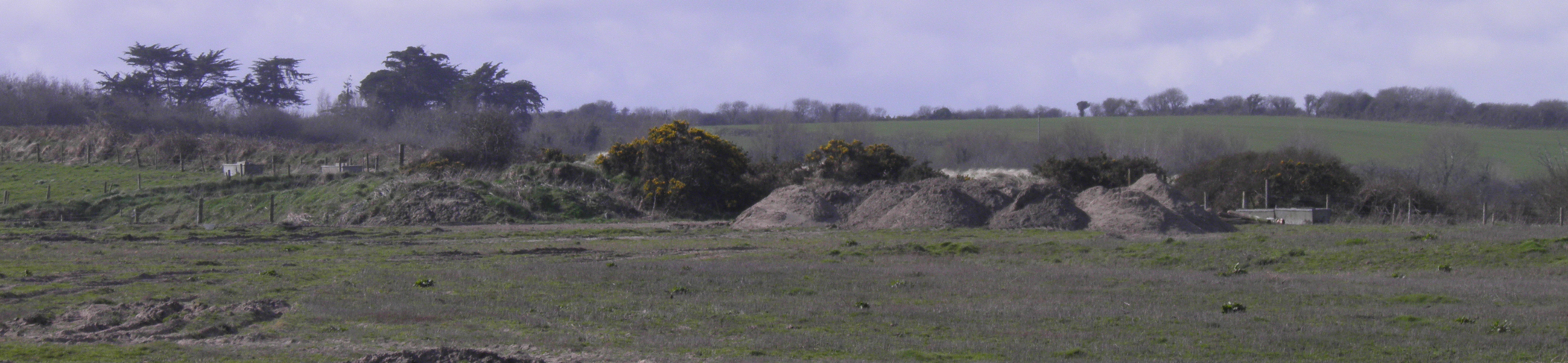
Damaged area March 2011, some restoration progress evident.

As at 2011 the National Parks and Wildlife Service is attempting to reverse degradation of a large portion of the site (11 ha) that has been damaged by overgrazing and bulldozing. Human-induced damage was first reported to the authorities in 2002. Damage continued for a further eight years before the area was made subject to a Ministerial Direction to restore it to its prior condition, issued under relevant Irish legislation.
