= Harold Butler =

Harold Butler may refer to:

- Harold Butler (businessman) (1921–1998), American entrepreneur
- Harold Edgeworth Butler (1878–1951), British classicist
- Harold Butler (cricketer) (1913–1991), English bowler
- Harold Butler of European League for Economic Cooperation
- Harold Butler (musician), Jamaican pianist and songwriter
- Harold Butler (civil servant) (1883–1951), British civil servant

== See also ==
- Harry Butler (disambiguation)
