= New Ross (disambiguation) =

New Ross may refer to:

- New Ross, County Wexford, a town in Ireland
  - New Ross (Parliament of Ireland constituency)
  - New Ross (UK Parliament constituency)
  - New Ross Golf Club
  - New Ross RFC, rugby union club
- New Ross, Nova Scotia, Canada
- New Ross, Indiana, United States

== See also ==
- New Ross 20, Nova Scotia, Canada
