= Henry Butler (hurler) =

Irish hurler

Personal information
- Native name: Anraí de Buitléir (Irish)
- Born: 1948 (age 77–78) Kilmuckridge, County Wexford, Ireland

Sport
- Sport: Hurling
- Position: Goalkeeper
Club
- Years: Club
- Buffers Alley
Club titles
- Wexford titles: 10
- Leinster titles: 2
- All-Ireland Titles: 1
Inter-county*
Years	County	Apps (scores)
1976-1979	Wexford	3 (0-00)
Inter-county titles
- Leinster titles: 0
- All-Irelands: 0
- NHL: 0
- All Stars: 0
- *Inter County team apps and scores correct as of 15:38, 15 March 2015.

Henry Butler (born 1948) is an Irish retired hurler who played as a goalkeeper for the Wexford senior team.

Born in Kilmuckridge, County Wexford, Butler first arrived on the inter-county scene at the age of seventeen when he first linked up with the Wexford minor team, before later joining the under-21 side. He made his senior debut during the 1976 championship. Butler went on to play a bit part for the team over the next few years, and won two Leinster medals as a non-playing substitute. He was an All-Ireland runner-up as a non-playing substitute on two occasions.

At club level Butler is a one-time All-Ireland medallist with Buffers Alley. In addition to this he also won two Leinster medals and ten championship medals.

Throughout his inter-county career Butler made 3 championship appearances for Wexford. His retirement came following the conclusion of the 1979 championship.

== Honours ==
=== Team ===
Buffers Alley

- All-Ireland Senior Club Hurling Championship (1): 1989
- Leinster Senior Club Hurling Championship (2): 1986, 1988
- Wexford Senior Club Hurling Championship (10) 1968, 1970, 1975, 1976, 1982, 1983, 1984, 1985, 1988, 1989

Wexford

- Leinster Senior Hurling Championship (2): 1976 (sub), 1977 (sub)
- Leinster Under-21 Hurling Championship (3): 1966
- All-Ireland Minor Hurling Championship (1): 1966
- Leinster Minor Hurling Championship (1): 1966
