= Ballyhack, County Wexford =

Village in County Wexford, Ireland

Ballyhack Baile Hac
- Village
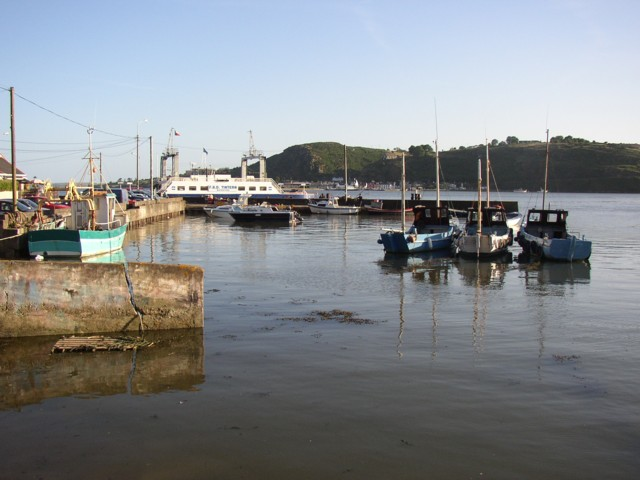
- Ballyhack Harbour

- Location in Ireland
- Coordinates: 52°14′38″N 6°58′01″W
- Country: Ireland
- Province: Leinster
- County: Wexford

Population (2016)
  - Total: 206
- Time zone: UTC+0 (WET)
  - Summer (DST): UTC-1 (IST (WEST))
- Area code: 051

Ballyhack (Irish: Baile Hac or Baile Each) is a small village located in the south-west of County Wexford, in Ireland, on the eastern shore of the Waterford Harbour, which is the estuary of The Three Sisters

== History ==
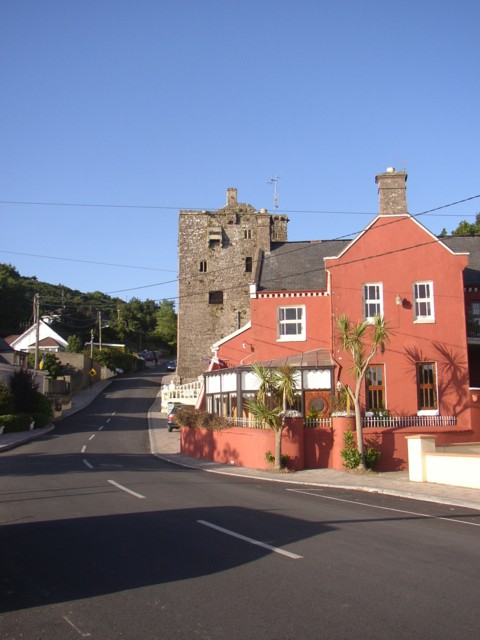
Ballyhack Castle

The village contains a 15th-century Norman castle or tower house, which belonged to the Knights Hospitallers and was built around 1480, though it is thought the site's use was initially as a Preceptory, as far back as the 12th-century. The castle was occupied by Cromwellian forces during the Irish Rebellion of 1641, and was later used as a transportation point for those displaced by the Act for the Settlement of Ireland 1652. It is from this association that the phrase "Go to Ballyhack" was coined.

The castle is open to the public, having been partially restored, and displays objects relating to the Crusades, the Normans, and medieval monks. Some of the features of the castle that are on view are its dungeon, murder-hole, effigies and oratory. The castle is a National Monument, in state care, number 516.

== Name ==
Ballyhack has been represented in Irish as Baile Hac and Baile Each. The derivation is believed to be from the Irish word for stable, seasmhach, and baile, meaning town, village, home or settlement. Thus, Ballyhack would mean the place or town of the stable.

== Amenities ==
The village contains a shop, a pub, an old schoolhouse, and a small quay for fishing boats. The village also features a memorial to those lost at sea, which was unveiled in 2015.

A ferry service operates between Ballyhack and Passage East (County Waterford), over the broad estuary of The Three Sisters.

There is also a cemetery located on a height near the edge of the village, which is located on the site of the former Ballyhack Church (Saint James's). The church was closed in the late 1800s, and demolished at some point before 1902. A point of interest in the graveyard includes a record of a Laurence Power, who supposedly died in 1836 at age 170.

The school in the village is called St. Catherine's NS and is located on top of Ballyhack Hill. It opened over a century ago.

== Sport ==
The local Gaelic Athletic Association club is St James GAA, which plays in the Intermediate grade of the Wexford Championship. The local soccer team is Duncannon FC.

== See also ==
- List of towns and villages in Ireland
