= Bannow =

Village in County Wexford, Ireland

Bannow Banú
- Village
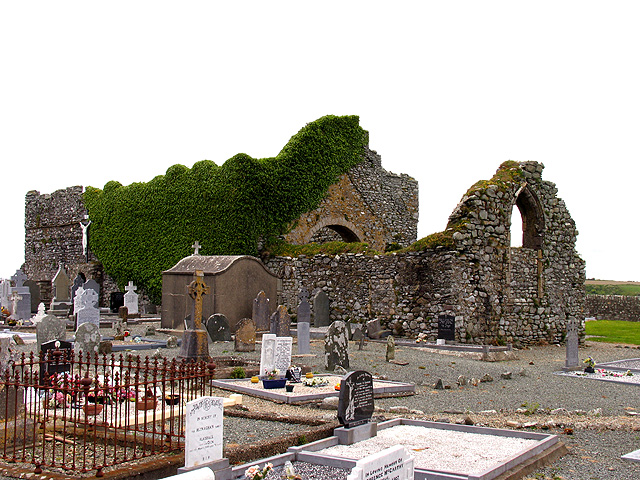
- Ruined church and graveyard overlooking Bannow Island beach

- Location in Ireland
- Coordinates: 52°13′N 6°46′W
- Country: Ireland
- Province: Leinster
- County: Wexford

Population (2022)
  - Total: 391
- (Carrig-on-Bannow/Danescastle census area)
- Time zone: UTC+0 (WET)
  - Summer (DST): UTC-1 (IST (WEST))
- Area code: 051

Bannow (Irish: Banú) is a village and civil parish lying east of Bannow Bay on the southwest coast of County Wexford, Ireland. The main settlement in the parish is the village of Carrig-on-Bannow (or Carrig).

While, in modern times, the main settlement is at Carrig-on-Bannow, in Norman times there was a borough called Bannow on Bannow Island at the mouth of the bay. This town has since disappeared, possibly due to the silting up of the natural harbour channels in the 14th century, and the former island is now attached to the rest of the parish.

== History ==
It is believed that the Vikings had a strong early presence in the area, due to the survival of numerous Norse place-names in the locality. The Norman conquest of Ireland began in Bannow Bay in 1169, when three ships commanded by Robert Fitz-Stephen arrived at the behest of Diarmait MacMurrough to support his claim to the Kingdom of Leinster.

Another group of Normans under Raymond le Gros landed the following year on the far side of Bannow Bay, on the Hook Peninsula at Baginbun, which was then called Irish: Dún Domhnaill. There was a small promontory fort there, used by the Normans for defence and thereby ensure a safe landing.

At Bannow Island, the ruins can still be seen of the 13th-century Norman Romanesque parish church of St Mary, originally impropriated to the monks of Canterbury. It consists of a nave and chancel. Another famous Norman soldier and officer who landed in the first invasion was Meiler Fitzhenry, whose son adopted his father's name, and thus began the Meyler family of County Wexford, who later were prominent in the Wexford Rebellion of 1798.

Bannow Borough was a borough constituency returning two members to the Parliament of Ireland until the Act of Union 1800 disenfranchised it. It was a pocket borough with the same proprietor and electors as Clonmines Borough, another rotten borough for the deserted town of Clonmines at the northern limit of Bannow Bay. The most prominent local landlords in Bannow from the late 17th century were the Boyse family, who lived at Bannow House. The last member of the Boyse family left the area in 1948.

During the Irish Rebellion of 1798, the fleeing loyalist garrison of the town of Wexford crossed the nearby Scar at Barrystown on their way to Duncannon Fort. In the late 19th century, the area was heavily involved in the Land Wars.

== Amenities ==
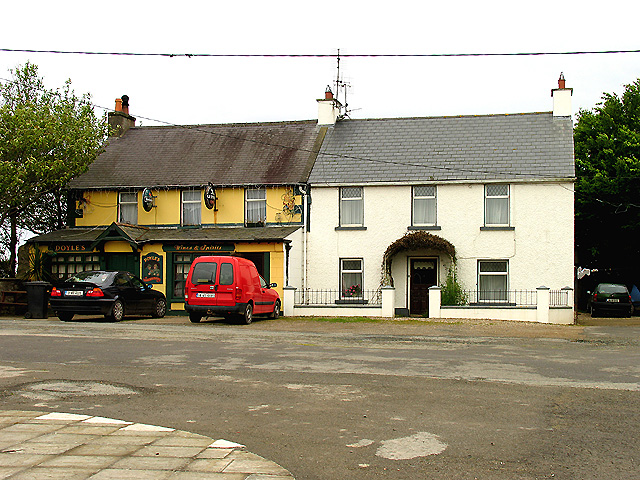
Pub in Carrig-on-Bannow

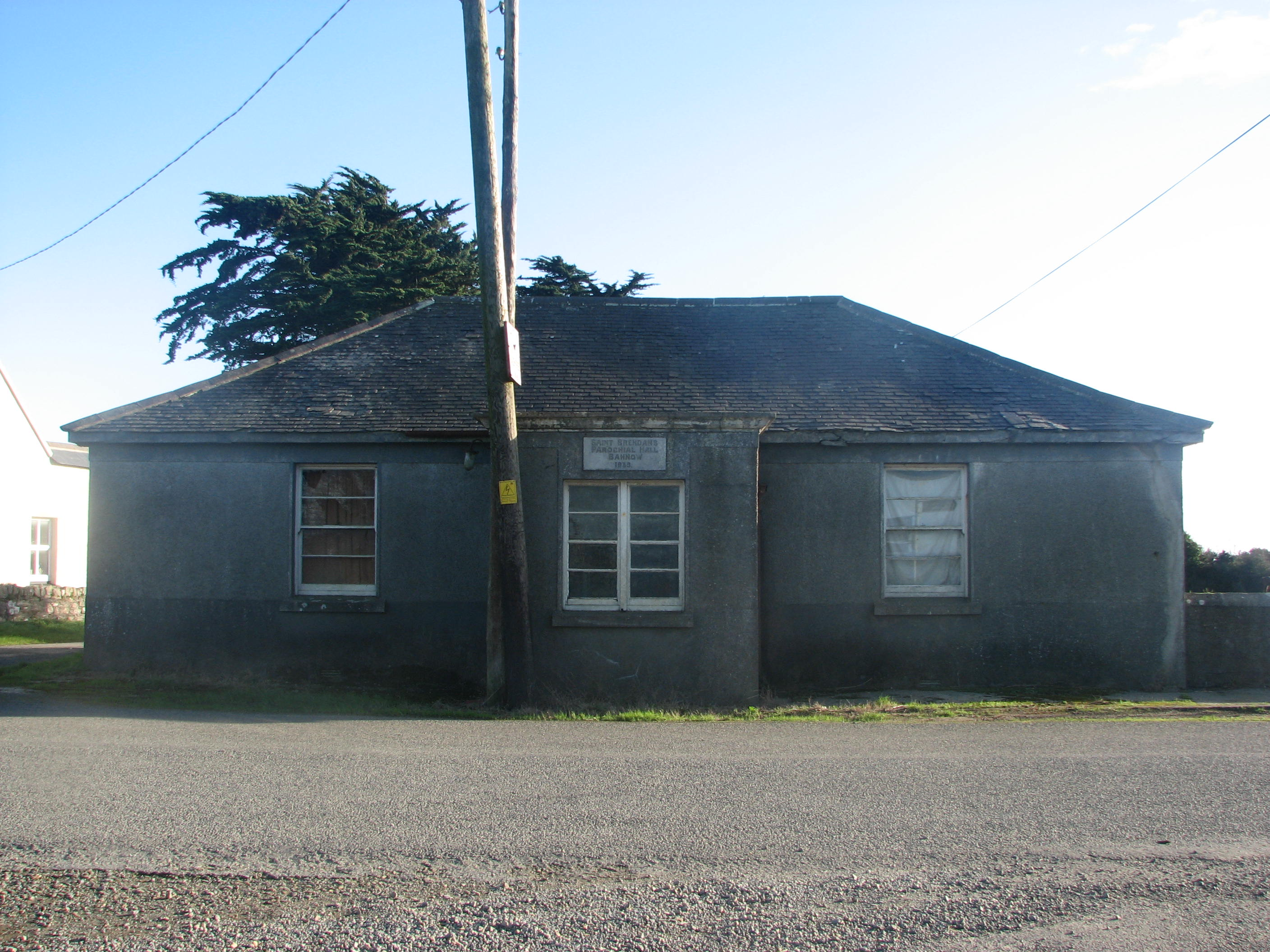
St. Brendan's Parochial Hall, situated close to Bannow Bay

The Catholic church in Carrig-on-Bannow was first built in 1856 and has been altered several times since. It is within the Catholic parish of Bannow in the Diocese of Ferns. The church has an adjoining graveyard. Approximately one kilometre away is the Church of Ireland (Anglican) church at Balloughton. This church, dedicated to Saint Paul, was completed in 1822.

The local national (primary) school, Scoil Mhuire or Danescastle National School, had an enrollment of 139 pupils as of July 2025.

Carrig also has a Garda station, handball alley, an An Post post office, a café, a doctor's office, a shop, and several public houses. There are beaches on Bannow Island, at Cockle Strand, Blackhall, and Cullenstown.

== Transport ==
Wexford Local Link route 388 serves Carrig-on-Bannow several times daily linking it to Wexford. Several buses a day also serve Wellingtonbridge, which is approximately 5 kilometres away. Until September 2010, Wellingtonbridge railway station was also served by rail.

== Sport ==
The local Gaelic Athletic Association club is Bannow-Ballymitty GAA Club, which has pitches located at Grantstown. The club has two pitches, a stand and an indoor complex with an upstairs viewing area. As of 2018, the club's adult men's teams were playing junior hurling and intermediate football.

Camogie and Ladies football clubs are also based at the Bannow-Ballymitty grounds. Bannow-Ballymitty Camogie Club was founded in 1950 and was originally called St. Mary's. Though it folded in the mid-1960s, it was reformed in 1992 as Bannow-Ballymitty.

Nearby is Corach Ramblers soccer club. Handball is also played at Ballymitty Handball Club. The handball alley in Carrick dates from the late 19th-century.

== Music ==
Formed locally, the Danescastle Music Group (Bannow Comhaltas Ceoltóirí Éireann) had over 150 pupils as of 2010. It is a County Wexford branch of Comhaltas Ceoltóirí Éireann (Comhaltas). Other members of Comhaltas in the parish include the Gleeson family, the Murphy Bros, Sean Stafford, Nick Bennett and many more traditional musicians and singers.

Colfers pub is a venue for traditional sessions, and the "Phil Murphy Weekend" is held every year in Carrig on Bannow.

== Demographics ==
As of the 2022 census, Carrig-on-Bannow (also previously known as Danescastle for census purposes) had a population of 391, up from 218 as of the 2006 census.

== Notable people ==
- Ben Brosnan, Gaelic footballer
- Peter Ffrench, Irish politician
- Anna Maria Hall (Mrs. S.C. Hall), Dublin-born author who lived in nearby Graige as a child
