= Joshua Nunn =

Colonel Joshua Arthur Nunn CB CIE DSO FRSE (1853–1908) was an Irish-born veterinarian and later barrister working in India and South Africa.

== Life ==
He was born on 10 May 1853 at Hill Castle in County Wexford in Ireland, the son of Edward W. Nunn JP DL. He was educated at Wimbledon College in England. He served in the Royal Monmouthshire Royal Engineers Militia from 1871 to 1877. In 1874 he enrolled in the Royal Veterinary College in Camden Town and was admitted MRCVS in 1877. He received a certificate in Cattle Pathology from the Royal Agricultural Society in the same year.

In 1877 he sailed to India as Veterinary Surgeon to the Royal Artillery. From September 1879 to August 1880 he served in the Second Anglo-Afghan War in charge of transport and communications in the Khyber Pass and Lughman valley. He was then placed in charge of the hospital at Gandamak.

From 1880 to 1885 he was attached to the Indian Civil Service attached to the Punjab district and charge with disease control as required under the Glanders and Farcy Act. In 1886 he was ordered to go to South Africa to investigate a major outbreak of horse sickness. He first undertook courses in bacteriology at Cambridge and Paris as the outbreak was believed to be anthrax and would then have been a national disaster. He reached South Africa in January 1887. He proved the disease was malarial in origin. In 1888 he took part in the Zulu Campaign and was present at the surrender of Chief Somkali at the St Lucia Lagoon.

He returned to India in January 1889 as veterinary officer to the Chittagong column as part of the Chin Lushai Expedition. For this he was Mentioned in Dispatches and also became the first veterinary officer to win the Distinguished Service Order. He then left military circles to become Principal of Lahore Veterinary College from 1890. Queen Victoria created him a Commander of the Order of the Indian Empire (CIE) in 1895. Probably due to ill-health he returned to England in December 1896 and began studying Law as an alternative career. He was aged 43 at this time. He qualified as a barrister at Lincoln's Inn in November 1899. He returned to South Africa as an Advocate of the Supreme Court of the Transvaal. This move was however short-lived and he returned to veterinary science in 1901 in England as Deputy Director General of the Army Veterinary Department.

In 1902 he was elected a Fellow of the Royal Society of Edinburgh. His proposers were William Owen Williams, John McFadyean, Sir Thomas Richard Fraser and James Hunter.

In 1904 he became Principal Veterinary Officer for England. In 1905 he became Principal Veterinary Officer for South Africa, and finally in 1906 Principal Veterinary Officer for India. King Edward VII created him a Commander of the Order of the Bath in 1906.

He retired due to continuing ill-health in 1907n and died in Oxford on 23 February 1908.

== Family ==
In 1907 (aged 54) he married Gertrude Ann Chamberlain (née Kellner) a widow. He died within a year of marrying. They had no children.

== Publications ==
- Animal Diseases in Rohtak (1882)
- Diseases in Sialkote and Hazara (1883)
- Diseases in the Montgomery and Shapur Districts (1885)
- Reports on African Horse Sickness (1888)
- Notes on Stable Management in India and the Colonies (1896)
- Lectures on Saddlery and Harness (1902)
- Veterinary First Aid in Cases of ASccident or Sudden Illness (1903)
- The Use of Molasses as a Feeding Material (1903)
- Veterinary Toxicology (1906)
- Diseases of the Mammary Gland of Domestic Animals
