= Harry Butler (disambiguation) =

Harry Butler (William Henry Butler, 1930–2015) was an Australian naturalist and environmental consultant.

Harry Butler may also refer to:

- Harry Butler (aviator) (Henry John Butler, 1889–1922), Australian aviation pioneer and WWI flying ace
- Harry Butler (rugby league) (1887–1965), Australian rugby league footballer in 1908 NSWRFL season

== See also ==
- Lionel Harry Butler (1923–1981), UK academic, Principal of Royal Holloway College, University of London
- Henry Butler (disambiguation)
- Harold Butler (disambiguation)
