= William Young (composer) =

English viol player and composer

William Young (died 23 April 1662) was an English viol player and composer of the Baroque era, who worked at the court of Ferdinand Charles, Archduke of Austria in Innsbruck. The sonatas which he published in 1653 were some of the earliest sonatas produced by an English composer.

== Biography ==
The details of Young's origins are unknown. By 1652 he was a chamber musician at the Innsbruck court, where "the Englishman", as he was called, was a highly regarded viol player and composer. The design of his English-made viol influenced that of some of the viols built by Jakob Stainer, the Austrian luthier. In 1660 Ferdinand Charles granted permission for Young to visit England, but there are no traces of his reappearance there. He is not to be confused with William Young (died 1671), another musician, who played violin and flute at the court of Charles II of England from 1661.

Young died on 23 April 1662 and was buried at Innsbruck's parish church, St Jakob, which has since become Innsbruck Cathedral.

== Works ==
Young and Henry Butler, an English viol player working at the Spanish court, were the first English composers to call their works sonatas. However, Butler died in 1652 with his three sonatas unpublished. Young's 11 sonatas for two, three, and four parts and continuo, published in Innsbruck in 1653, are known to have reached England. In modern times, the 11 sonatas were rediscovered by William Gillies Whittaker. He found them in manuscript in Uppsala University Library in Sweden, and published them in 1930.
