= Lady's Island Lake =

Lake in County Wexford, Ireland

- Loch Tóchair (Irish)
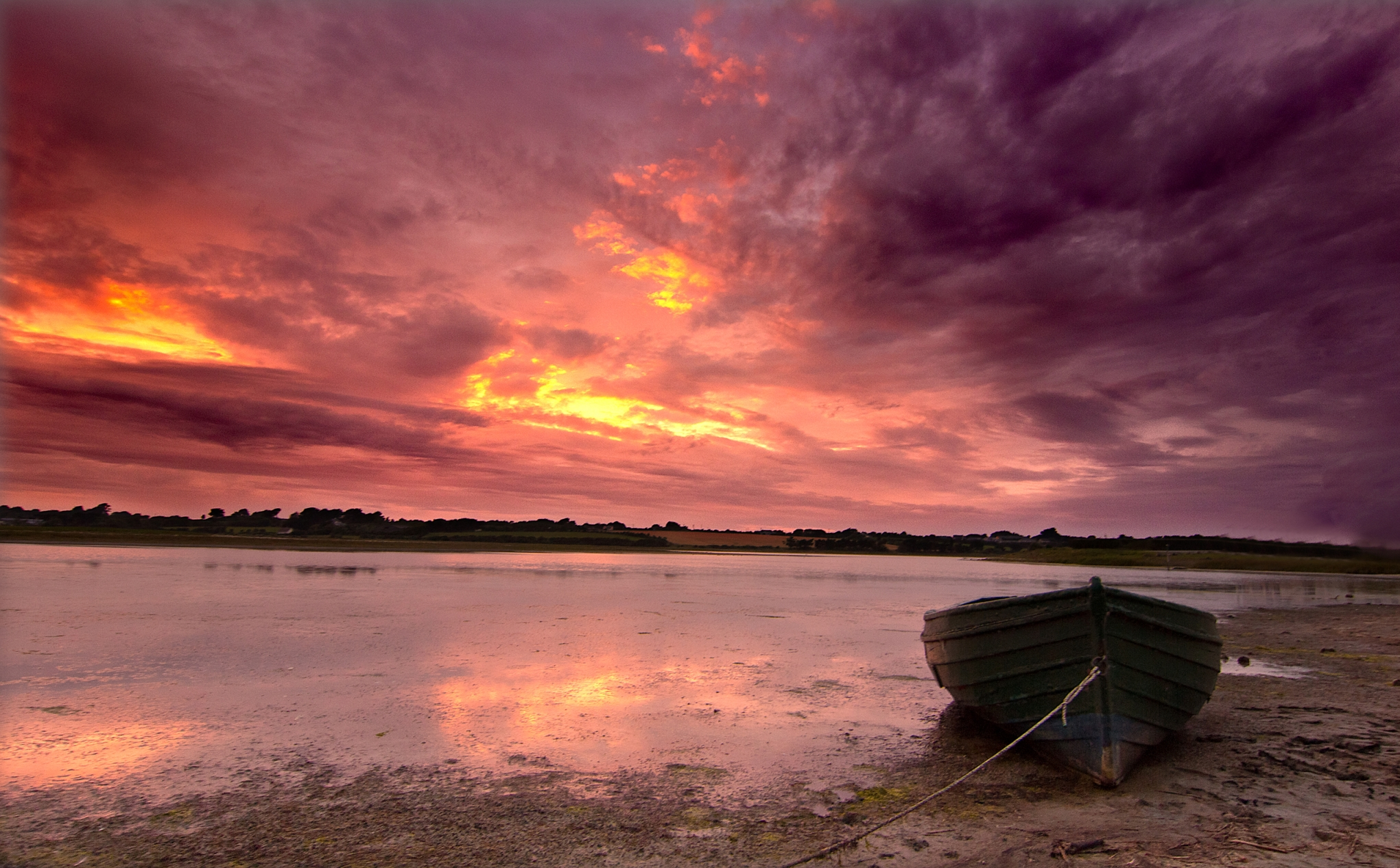

- Location within Ireland
- Location: County Wexford
- Coordinates: 52°12′0″N 6°23′30″W
- Type: Brackish
- Primary inflows: The Cut
- Basin countries: Ireland
- Settlements: Our Lady's Island

Lady's Island Lake, historically Lough Togher (Irish: Loch Tóchair), is a brackish lake in the south of County Wexford, Ireland.

The lake is technically a back-barrier seepage lagoon, one of only two in Ireland. The other is nearby Tacumshin Lake. The lake has no natural outlet, but is separated from the Atlantic Ocean at the southern end by a sand and gravel bar 200 m wide. Salt water seeps through the barrier, while fresh water flows into the lake from run-off from the land around the lake. This means that the lake is neither fresh nor salt water but somewhere in between.

The bar is breached or "cut" mechanically for drainage in an annual event locally known as the "Cutting of the Lake". This is done by the Lady's Island Lake Drainage Committee in association with the National Parks and Wildlife Service, but historical records mention the cut in the seventeenth century. The sandbar is also breached by occasional storms when salt water flows in from the sea, increasing the salt levels considerably. Wildlife in the lake must therefore be able to cope with variable levels of salinity.

The lake is an important breeding ground for terns. It is estimated that the lake is home to over 1,200 breeding pairs of Sandwich terns and, more importantly, to 150 breeding pairs of the rare roseate tern; this is the second largest colony in Europe.

At the north end of the lake is the village of Lady's Island or Our Lady's Island. The 'island' itself has been joined to the mainland by a causeway, so it is actually a peninsula sticking out into the lake from the village. On the peninsula are a castle, a leaning tower, church ruins and a graveyard. The leaning tower is a small stone tower which was built on unstable ground and now leans at an angle. The space in front of the castle is a pilgrimage site associated with the Blessed Virgin Mary: the pilgrimage takes place in August each year, when believers come from all over Ireland to gather and pray.

== Public transport access ==
TFI Local Link route WX20 provides a link between Wexford railway station and Our Lady's Island on Fridays replacing the Bus Éireann route 378 service which was cut in January 2026.

== See also ==
- List of loughs in Ireland
