= Harold Butler (musician) =

Jamaican pianist and songwriter

Harold Butler is a Jamaican pianist and songwriter. He is the younger brother of Leslie "Professor" Butler.

== As songwriter ==
- "One Step Ahead" Hammond
- Got to Get Away
- Love Forever by Schloss
- Let Love Be Your Righthand Man Ernest Wilson

== As keyboard player ==
Selected discography:

- on Baldhead Bridge
