= Cullenstown =

Coastal village in County Wexford, Ireland

Cullenstown Baile Chuilinn
- Village
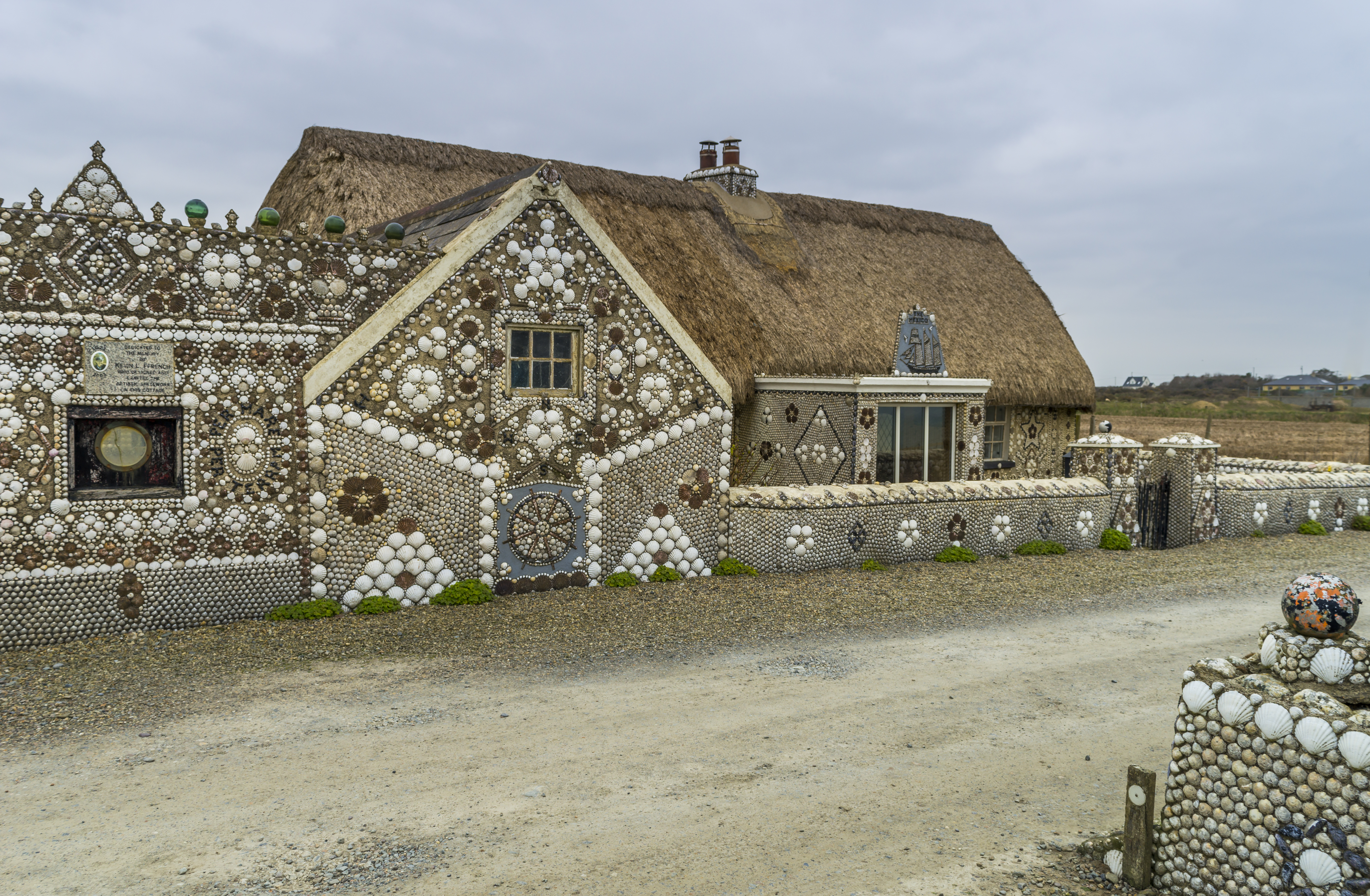
- Cliff Cottage ("shell cottage") in Cullenstown

- Location in Ireland
- Coordinates: 52°13′N 6°43′W
- Country: Ireland
- Province: Leinster
- County: Wexford
- Time zone: UTC+0 (WET)
  - Summer (DST): UTC-1 (IST (WEST))
- Area code: 051

Cullenstown (Irish: Baile Chuilinn) is a townland and small village located on the south coast of County Wexford, in Ireland. A small beach, Cullenstown Strand, is located nearby. It is about 25 km by road from Wexford town.

Cullenstown is home to the "shell cottage" (also known as "cliff cottage"), a 19th century thatched farmhouse which was decorated with shells by Kevin Ffrench. The house took over 30 years to decorate. The area also contains a Gaelic handball alley, a pub, and a number of holiday homes.

== See also ==
- List of towns and villages in Ireland
