= Nicholas Furlong (writer) =

Irish writer and historian (1929–2022)

Nicholas Furlong (1929 – 21 March 2022) was an Irish farmer, journalist, author and historian from County Wexford.

== Biography ==
Nicholas Furlong was born in Wexford in 1929. He became a dairy farmer on the family farm at Mulgannon. His father also owned a Pub, located on Wexford town's main street. He attended St Peter's College, Wexford, the Salesian Agricultural College, Warrenstown, County Meath, and University College Dublin (UCD).

For many years he wrote a satirical column for the People Group under the pen name "Pat O'Leary" and wrote regular features in The Irish Press, the Farmers Journal and Biatas (journal to the Irish Sugar Company). He latterly worked as a columnist with Echo Group Newspapers.

Furlong was also a member of the Royal Society of Antiquaries of Ireland. He died in County Wexford on 21 March 2022, at the age of 93.

== Works ==
- Wexford in the Rare Oul' Times (with John Hayes). Numerous Volumes - consisting primarily of early photographs of County Wexford. Volume 1 was published in 1985.
- A History of County Wexford. Dublin: Gill & MacMillan, 2003. ISBN 0-7171-3461-X.
- Foster Son to a King. Dublin: Children's Press, 1986.
- Fr John Murphy of Boolavogue 1753–1798. Dublin: Geography Publications, 1991. ISBN 0-906602-18-1.
- The Greatest Hurling Decade. Dublin: Wolfhound Press, 1993.
- Diarmait: King of Leinster. Cork: Mercier Press, 2006. ISBN 978-1-85635-505-6. This is a biography of Dermot Mac Murrough, an edition previously published as Dermot, King of Leinster, and the foreigners. Tralee, Co. Kerry: Anvil Books, 1973.
- "Young Farmer Seeks Wife". Dublin: Merlin Mercier, 2002. This was his first novel.

Furlong also wrote for the stage. His plays include: Insurrection '98, The Lunatic Fringe, Purple and Gold, and Storm the Bastille which was produced by Harry Ringwood and first performed in Abbey Square, Enniscorthy, in July 1989.

== Sources ==
- Furlong, Nicholas. Fr John Murphy of Boolavogue 1753–1798. Dublin: Geography Publications, 1991). ISBN 0-906602-18-1.
- Furlong, Nicholas. A History of County Wexford. Dublin: Gill & MacMillan, 2003. ISBN 0-7171-3461-X.
- "Nicholas Furlong's Profile". Mercier Press website.
