= Grey dune =

Type of sand dune

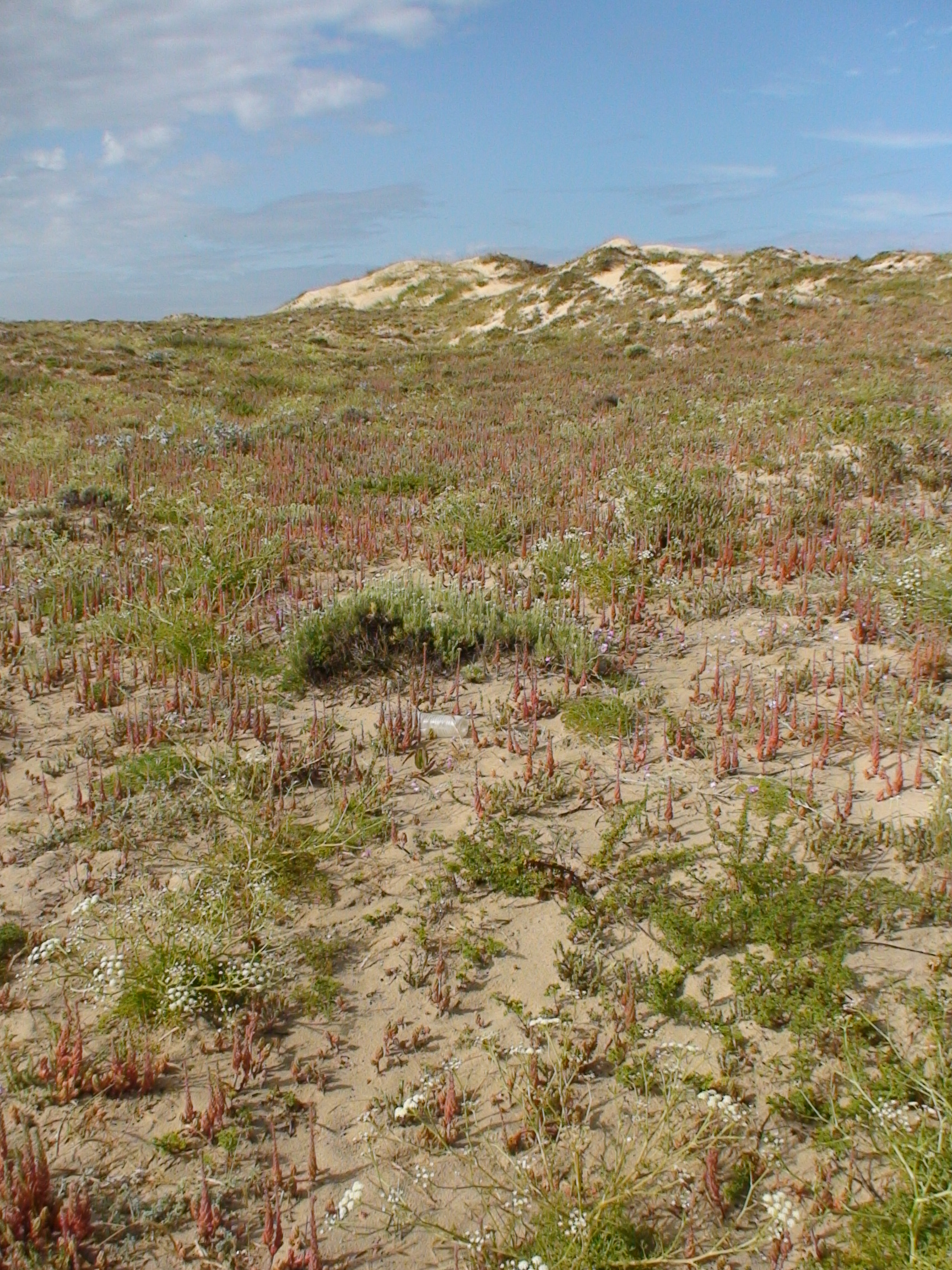
Grey dune in Baleal, Peniche, Portugal

Grey dunes are fixed, stable sand dunes that are covered by a continuous layer of herbaceous vegetation. These dunes are typically located 50–100 meters from the ocean shore and are found on the landward side of foredunes (also known as yellow dunes). Grey dunes are named for their characteristic grey color which is a result of the ground cover of lichen combined with a top soil layer of humus.

== Formation ==
Grey dunes are formed when pioneer species inhabit embryo dunes and begin a successional process toward dune stabilization and soil formation. Pioneer plants capture saltating sand grains carried by the wind and deposit them to continue build up the dune. Grey dunes are then formed after the root structures of pioneering plants stabilize foredunes. Sand stabilization allows for dead plant material to be decomposed within the soil, adding nutrients and water-retention abilities to the soil. As soil starts to slowly form, new plant species colonize the stable dunes ultimately developing more extensive root structures and plant diversity. When the dune has become continuously vegetated, lichen and moss grows in the understory, providing a water-repellent surface that reduces erosion (through rainfall and wind), this results in the official formation of the grey dune.

Pluvial processes dominate the geomorphology of grey dunes, with rain splash and slope wash being the most common processes taking place. Erosion can take place in the form of rain splash and slope wash. Rain splash occurs when a raindrop impacts the bare soil surface and disperses soil particles to the surrounding area. However, as grey dunes begin to develop, lichens and mosses protect the dune surfaces and dissipate raindrop impacts. Slope wash (overland flow) is particularly evident in sparsely vegetated dune slopes. Slope wash occurs when rainfall infiltration is impeded, which can result in rills and alluvial fans.

=== Dune pH ===
Depending on the sand composition, a grey dune will become either acidic or calcareous. An acidic soil substrate will form if the sand is composed completely of quartz grains. Older grey dunes can also exhibit acidic conditions if there has been enough rainfall to leach out the soil nutrients. Calcareous soil substrates form when seashells decompose to create a lime-rich environment. The vegetation on grey dunes is dependent on the pH of the soil substrate.

== Vegetation ==
Many rare and endangered plant species can be found within grey dune ecosystems, providing niche habitats for animals and insects. A wide variety of orchids, grasses, and lichens are found in grey dune plant communities but species will depend on locations throughout the European continent.

== Location ==
Grey dunes are found along much of the European coast and along large, inland bodies of water. Broadly speaking, they can be found along the Celtic, Baltic, and North Seas, the Eastern and Mid Atlantic coast, the Western and Eastern Mediterranean coasts, and the Black Sea.

== Loss of Grey Dunes ==
Grey dunes are highly susceptible to change from both natural and human-induced events. Since the 1960s, grey dune ecosystems have declined from the encroachment of grass and shrub species, and more recently, by the invasion by the alien invasive Heath Star Moss (Campylopus introflexus). Causes of the encroachment have been related to large-scale sand dune stabilization, high nitrogen deposition from the vegetation, and a decline in rabbit populations within the dunes. Grass and shrub encroachment has resulted in the fragmentation of grey dune landscapes (and overall reduction in habitat), a loss of biodiversity, and a decline of endangered and rare species that are endemic to grey dunes.

== See also ==
- Kilmuckridge-Tinnaberna Sandhills
- Foredune
