= County Wexford =

County in Ireland

County Wexford Contae Loch Garman
- County
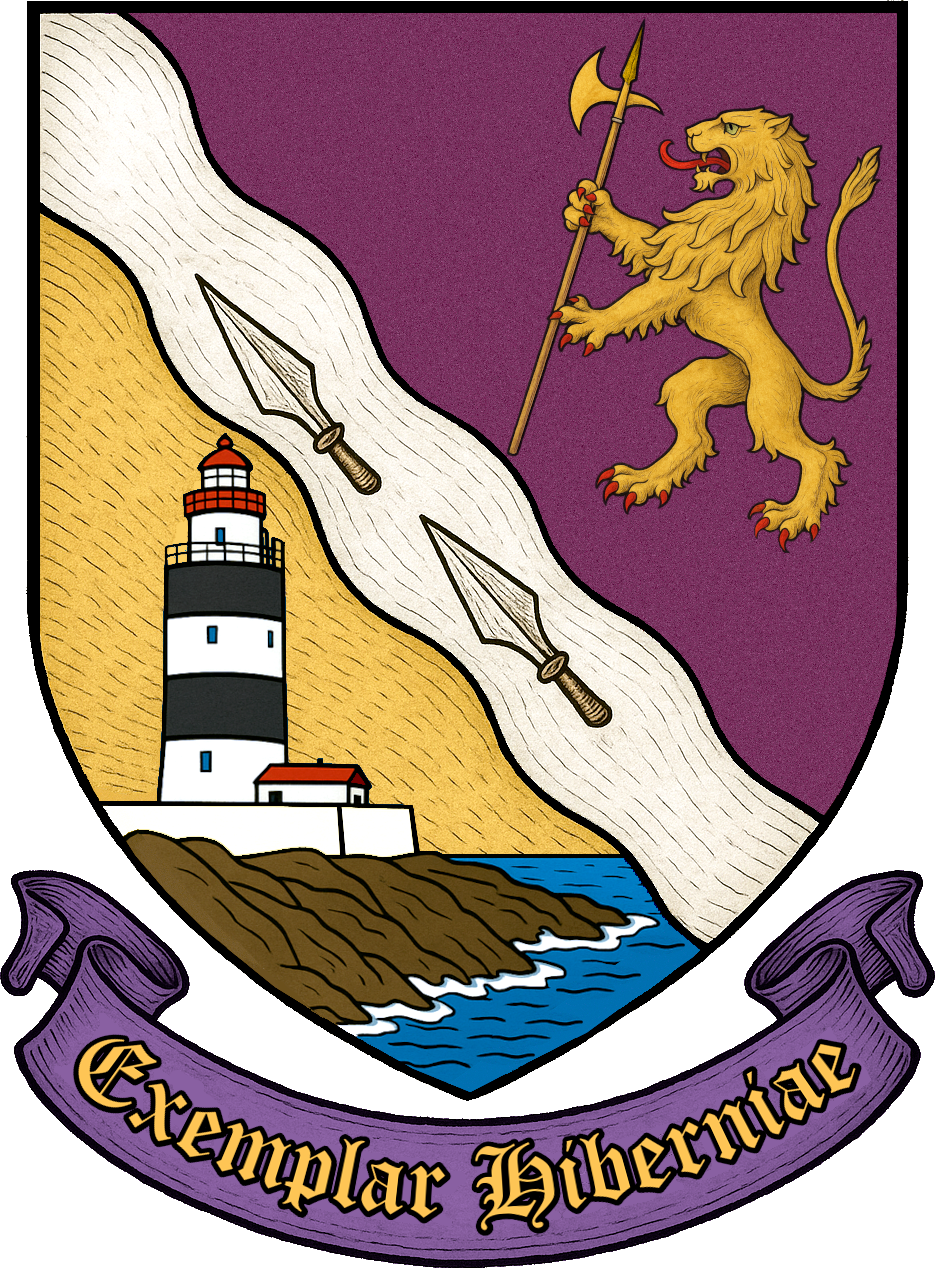
- Coat of arms
- Nickname: The Model County
- Motto: Exemplar Hiberniae (Latin) "An example to Ireland" "Sampla na hÉireann"
- Interactive map of County Wexford
- Coordinates: 52.5°N 6.75°W
- Country: Ireland
- Province: Leinster
- Region: Southern
- Established: 1210
- County town: Wexford

Government
  - Local authority: Wexford County Council
  - Dáil constituency: Wexford; Wicklow–Wexford
  - EP constituency: South

Area
  - Total: 2,367 km^{2} (914 sq mi)
  - Rank: 13th
- Highest elevation (Mount Leinster): 794 m (2,605 ft)

Population (2022)
  - Total: 163,527
  - Rank: 14th
  - Density: 69.09/km^{2} (178.9/sq mi)
- Time zone: UTC±0 (WET)
  - Summer (DST): UTC+1 (IST)
- Eircode routing keys: Y21, Y25, Y34, Y35 (primarily)
- Telephone area codes: 051, 052, 053, 056 (primarily)
- ISO 3166 code: IE-WX
- Vehicle index mark code: WX
- Website: Official website

County Wexford (Irish: Contae Loch Garman) is a county in Ireland. It is in the province of Leinster and is part of the Southern Region. Named after the town of Wexford, it was based on the historic Gaelic territory of Hy Kinsella (Uí Ceinnsealaigh), whose capital was Ferns. Wexford County Council is the local authority for the county. The population of the county was 163,527 at the 2022 census.

== History ==
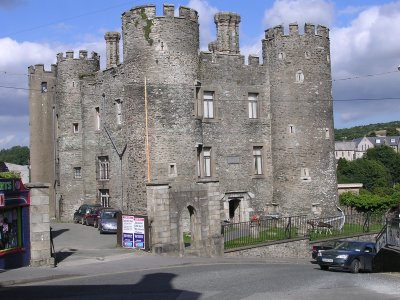
Enniscorthy Castle

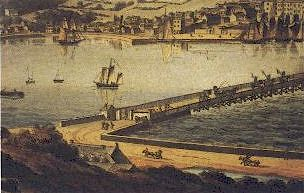
Wexford town c. 1800.

The county is rich in evidence of early human habitation. Portal tombs (sometimes called dolmens) exist at Ballybrittas (on Bree Hill) and at Newbawn – and date from the Neolithic period or earlier. Remains from the Bronze Age period are far more widespread. Early Irish tribes formed the Kingdom of Uí Cheinnsealaig, an area that was slightly larger than the current County Wexford.

County Wexford was one of the earliest areas of Ireland to be Christianised, in the early 5th century. Later, from 819 onwards, the Vikings invaded and plundered many Christian sites in the county. Vikings settled at Wexford town near the end of the 9th century.

In 1169, Wexford was the site of the invasion of Ireland by Normans at the behest of Diarmuid Mac Murrough, King of Uí Cheinnsealaig and king of Leinster (Laigin). This was followed by the subsequent colonisation of the country by the Cambro-Normans.

The native Irish began to regain some of their former territories in the 14th century, especially in the north of the county, principally under Art MacMurrough Kavanagh. Under Henry VIII, the great religious houses were dissolved, 1536–41; in County Wexford this included Glascarrig Priory, Clonmines Priory, Tintern Abbey, and Dunbrody Abbey.

On 23 October 1641, a major rebellion broke out in Ireland, and County Wexford produced strong support for Confederate Ireland. Oliver Cromwell and his English Parliamentarian Army arrived in 1649 in the county and captured it. The lands of the Irish and Anglo-Normans were confiscated and given to Cromwell's soldiers as payment for their service in the Parliamentarian Army. At Duncannon, in the south-west of the county, James II, after his defeat at the Battle of the Boyne, embarked for Kinsale and then to exile in France.

County Wexford was the most important area in which the Irish Rebellion of 1798 was fought, during which significant battles occurred at The Battle of Oulart Hill during the 1798 rebellion. Vinegar Hill (Enniscorthy) and New Ross. The famous ballad "Boolavogue" was written in remembrance of the Wexford Rising. At Easter 1916, a small rebellion occurred at Enniscorthy town, on cue with that in Dublin. During World War II, German planes bombed Campile. In 1963 John F. Kennedy, then President of the United States, visited the county and his ancestral home at Dunganstown, near New Ross.

== Geography and subdivisions ==
Wexford is the 13th-largest of Ireland's thirty-two traditional counties in area, and 9th-largest in terms of population. It is the largest of Leinster's 12 counties in size, and fourth-largest in terms of population. The county is located in the south-east corner of the island of Ireland. It is bounded by the sea on two sides—on the south by the Atlantic Ocean and on the east by St. George's Channel and the Irish Sea. The River Barrow forms its western boundary. The Blackstairs Mountains form part of the boundary to the north, as do the southern edges of the Wicklow Mountains. The adjoining counties are Waterford to the south-west, Kilkenny to the west, Carlow to the north-west and Wicklow in the north.

=== Towns and villages ===
- County Town: Wexford
- Market Town: Gorey
- Adamstown
- Arthurstown
- Ballindaggin
- Ballycanew
- Ballycullane
- Ballyedmond
- Ballyfad
- Ballygarrett
- Ballyhack
- Ballywilliam
- Bannow
- Barntown
- Blackwater
- Bree
- Bridgetown
- Broadway
- Bunclody
- Camolin
- Campile
- Castlebridge
- Castletown
- Cleariestown
- Clohamon
- Clonroche
- Coolgreany
- Courtown
- Craanford
- Crossabeg
- Cullenstown
- Curracloe
- Duncannon
- Duncormick
- Enniscorthy
- Ferns
- Fethard-on-Sea
- Foulkesmill
- Gorey
- Hollyfort
- Inch
- Killinierin
- Kilmore
- Kilmore Quay
- Kilmuckridge
- Kiltealy
- Monamolin
- Monaseed
- Murrintown
- Monageer
- Newbawn
- New Ross
- Oulart
- Oylegate
- Poulpeasty
- Rathangan
- Rosslare
- Rosslare Harbour
- Raheen
- Rathnure
- Saltmills
- Taghmon
- Watch House Village
- Wellingtonbridge
- Wexford

=== Mountains and hills ===
Mount Leinster

Largely low-lying fertile land is the characteristic landscape of the county. The highest point in the county is Mount Leinster at 795 metres (2,608 ft), in the Blackstairs Mountains in the north-west on the boundary with County Carlow.

Other high points:

- Black Rock Mountain, 599 m (1,965 ft), located near the Wexford-Carlow border, within County Wexford.
- Croghan Mountain (or Croghan Kinsella) on the Wexford-Wicklow border – 606 m (1,988 ft)
- Annagh Hill, 454 m (1,490 ft), near the Wicklow border
- Slieveboy, 420 m (1,380 ft)

Notable hills include: Carrigbyrne Hill; Camross (or Camaross) Hill, 181 m (594 ft); Carrigmaistia, 167 m (548 ft); Bree Hill, 179 m (587 ft); Gibbet Hill; Vinegar Hill; Slievecoiltia; Forth Mountain, 237 m (778 ft); and Tara Hill.

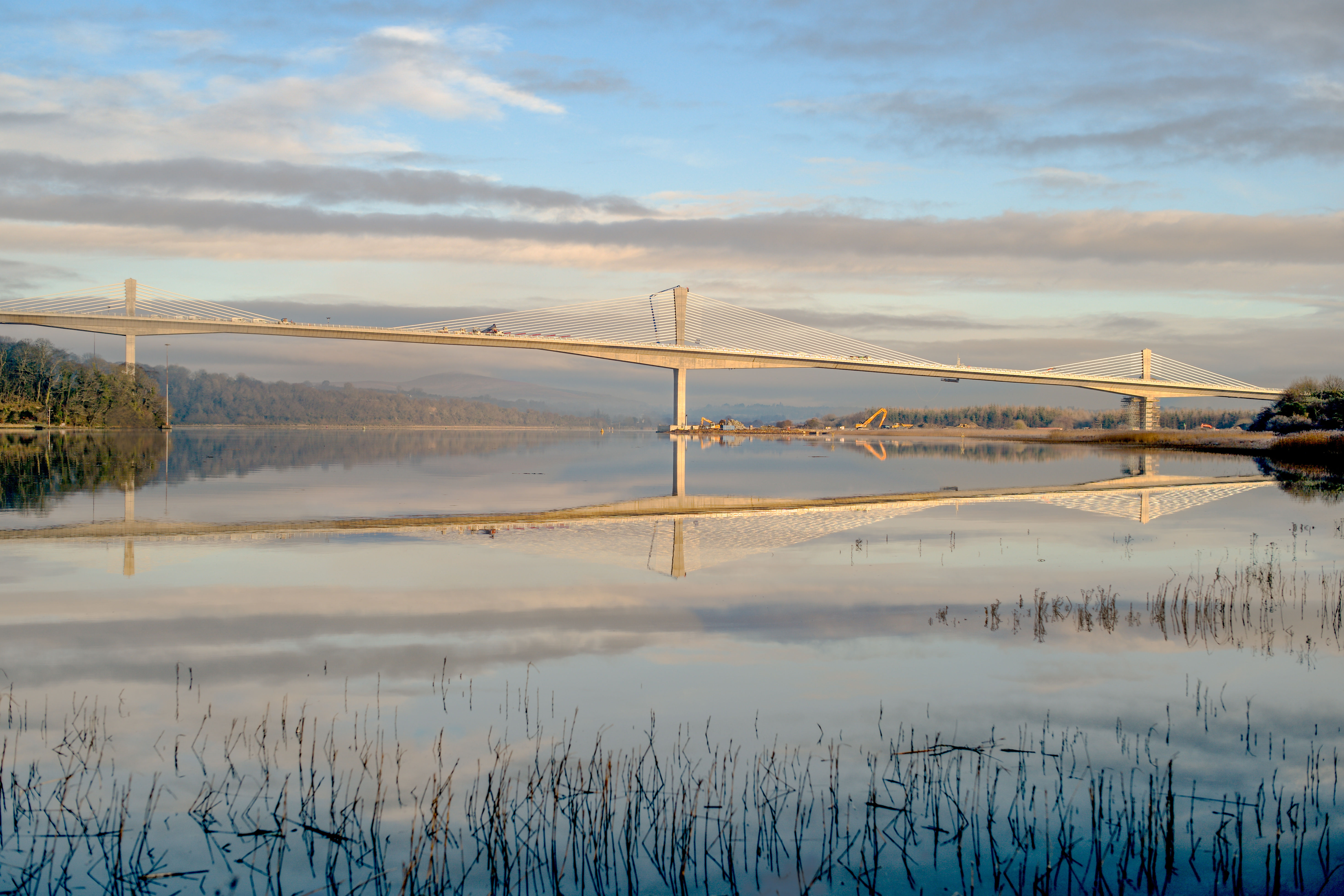
Rose Fitzgerald Kennedy Bridge, the longest in Ireland, crossing the River Barrow near New Ross

=== Rivers and lakes ===
The major rivers are the Slaney and the Barrow. At 192 km (119 mi) in length, the river Barrow is the second-longest river on the island of Ireland. Smaller rivers of note are the Owenduff, Pollmounty, Corrock, Urrin, Boro, Owenavorragh (also spelt Ounavarra), Sow and Bann rivers.

There are no significant fresh-water lakes in the county. Small seaside lakes or lagoons exist at two locations – one is called Lady's Island Lake and the other Tacumshin Lake.

The Wexford Cot is a flat-bottomed boat used for fishing on the tidal mudflats in Wexford. A canoe-shaped punt fitted with a gun, called a float in Wexford, is used traditionally to shoot game birds in the North Slob mud flats.

=== Islands ===
The Saltee Islands lie 5 km (3 mi) offshore from Kilmore Quay, while the smaller Keeragh Islands are 1.5 km (1 mi) offshore from Bannow.

=== Climate ===
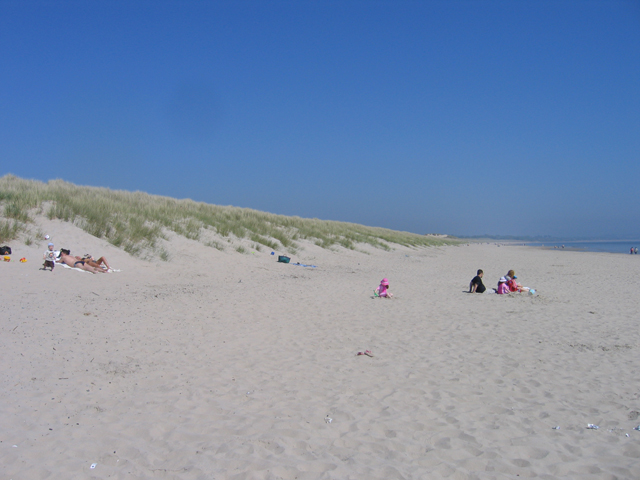
Curracloe Beach

County Wexford, sometimes dubbed Ireland's "sunny southeast", has in general a higher number of hours of sunshine recorded daily than in the rest of the country. This has resulted in Wexford becoming one of the most popular places in Ireland in which to reside. The county has a mild, but changeable, oceanic climate with few extremes. The North Atlantic Drift, a continuation of the Gulf Stream, moderates winter temperatures. There is a meteorological station located at Rosslare Harbour. January and February are generally the coldest months, with temperatures ranging from 4–9 °C (39–48 °F) on average. July and August are generally the warmest months, with average temperatures ranging from 13–19 °C (55–66 °F) in coastal areas and 12–22 °C (54–72 °F) in inland areas. The prevailing winds blow from the south-west. Precipitation falls throughout the year. Mean annual rainfall is 800–1,200 millimetres (31–47 in). Generally, the county receives less snow than more northerly parts of Ireland. Heavy snowfalls are relatively rare, but can occur. The one exception is Mount Leinster, visible from a large portion of the county, and frequently covered with snow during the winter months. Frost is frequent in winter months, less so in coastal areas.

=== Soil ===
An ice sheet covered most, but not all, of the county during the last Ice age. As the ice retreated, County Wexford would have been one of the first areas to be covered with glacial drift (a mixture of boulders, clay, sand and gravel) that blanketed the existing bedrock. This has led to high-quality soils, suitable for a wide range of agriculture. A very detailed soil survey of the county was published in 1964 as part of the 'National Soil Survey of Ireland'. It classifies each area of the county according to its specific soil type.

Most of the county is covered with soils called brown earths, described as well-drained and having a wide use-range. After that, gleys (poorly to imperfectly drained with a limited use-range) are the next major soil type, primarily located in the south-east of the county and east of Gorey (along the coast). Gleys are dotted elsewhere around the county in small areas, and where they occur they generally form bogland. The last major soil type, brown podzolics, occur mainly near the edges of the Blackstairs Mountain range and around Bunclody and in the baronies of East Shelmalier and South Ballaghkeen. Though there are areas covered with other soil types, these are of limited extent.

=== Flora ===
Common species of tree include oak, ash, sycamore, alder, blackthorn, hawthorn, beech and birch. Less common (but plentiful) species include wild cherry and Scots pine (also called red deal). Elm is now far less common, due to the devastating effects of Dutch elm disease. Gorse (or furze) is very common. A priority habitat in Wexford is the grey dune, on which many native wild flora grow, including bee orchid and pyramidal orchid. Despite the designation of much of this habitat as a Special Area of Conservation, it remains threatened by destruction for agricultural intensification. There is very little natural forest in the county. Most natural trees and vegetation grow on hedgerows.

=== Fauna ===
South-eastern Wexford is an important site for wild birds—the north side of Wexford Harbour, the North Slob, is home to 10,000 Greenland white-fronted geese each winter (roughly one third of the entire world's population), while in the summer Lady's Island Lake is an important breeding site for terns, especially the roseate tern. The grey heron is also seen.

Throughout the county pheasant, woodpigeon and feral pigeons are widespread. Mute swan, mallard, kingfisher, and owls (the long-eared owl, the short-eared owl, and the barn owl) are less common – but plentiful. Red grouse, once common, is now extremely scarce. The species has been in decline for some decades. Threats include habitat degradation, disease, predation and over-hunting. Red grouse in Ireland are now considered threatened. The corncrake, also once very common, is now almost never seen. Smaller birds—such as crows, swallows, robins, wrens and so on—are very common. The first magpies in Ireland were recorded by Robert Leigh, of Rosegarland, County Wexford, as having appeared in the County of Wexford about 1676. Land mammals include badger, rabbit, otter, hedgehog, red fox, mink, bats, squirrels (red and grey), rats (brown and black – both introduced species), and mice (wood (or field) and house). Two types of hare—the Irish (or mountain) hare and the less common brown (or European) hare—are found. Hare is not nearly as common as rabbit. The stoat (Mustela erminea hibernica) is also reasonably common. Locally the stoat is just as often incorrectly called a weasel.

Only two types of seal are found on County Wexford's coast—Atlantic grey seals are very plentiful in coastal areas; the slightly smaller common (or harbour) seal is less common, yet plentiful. The small tortoiseshell butterfly (reddish-orange colour, with black markings) is the most common species of butterfly in the county. Various types of moth are also common. The common frog – the only type of frog found – is plentiful.

== Governance and politics ==
The island of Ireland, showing location of County Wexford.

=== Local government ===
Wexford County Council has thirty-four members. The council has three representatives on the Southern Regional Assembly, where it is part of the South-East strategic planning area.

=== National politics ===
County Wexford is represented by the Dáil constituency of Wexford (five seats).

The county is part of the European Parliament constituency of South (five seats).

== Demographics ==
Historical population
Year	Pop.	±%
1500	4,550	—
1510	4,344	−4.5%
1550	5,010	+15.3%
1580	6,224	+24.2%
1585	9,870	+58.6%
1600	12,343	+25.1%
1610	3,456	−72.0%
1653	13,004	+276.3%
1659	11,680	−10.2%
1668	13,351	+14.3%
1672	15,339	+14.9%
1680	29,875	+94.8%
1690	36,310	+21.5%
1700	48,660	+34.0%
1705	52,399	+7.7%
1710	68,980	+31.6%
1715	71,445	+3.6%
1720	79,880	+11.8%
1725	83,455	+4.5%
1735	88,611	+6.2%
1745	87,222	−1.6%
1755	84,114	−3.6%
1765	81,396	−3.2%
1771	84,233	+3.5%
1775	87,222	+3.5%
1781	90,566	+3.8%
1788	104,760	+15.7%
1790	125,881	+20.2%
1801	120,688	−4.1%
1811	131,970	+9.3%
1813	128,455	−2.7%
1816	141,389	+10.1%
1821	155,377	+9.9%
1821	170,806	+9.9%
1831	182,713	+7.0%
1841	202,033	+10.6%
1851	180,158	−10.8%
1861	143,954	−20.1%
1871	132,666	−7.8%
1881	123,854	−6.6%
1891	111,778	−9.8%
1901	104,104	−6.9%
1911	102,273	−1.8%
1926	95,848	−6.3%
1936	94,245	−1.7%
1946	91,855	−2.5%
1951	90,032	−2.0%
1956	87,259	−3.1%
1961	83,308	−4.5%
1966	83,437	+0.2%
1971	86,351	+3.5%
1979	96,421	+11.7%
1981	99,081	+2.8%
1986	102,552	+3.5%
1991	102,069	−0.5%
1996	104,371	+2.3%
2002	116,596	+11.7%
2006	131,749	+13.0%
2011	145,320	+10.3%
2016	149,722	+3.0%
2022	163,527	+9.2%

In 2022, the county had a total population of 163,919 people. Of these, 61.4% (91,969 people) lived in rural areas and 38.6% (57,753 people) lived in urban areas. 83.8% of the population stated their religion as Roman Catholic, 7.1% other religions, and 7.5% stated they had no religion. Between 2006 and 2011, the population increased by 10%, slowing to 3% between 2011 and 2016.

=== Urban areas and populations ===
Town	Population (2022)
Wexford	21,524
Enniscorthy	12,310
Gorey	11,517
New Ross	8,610

== Culture ==
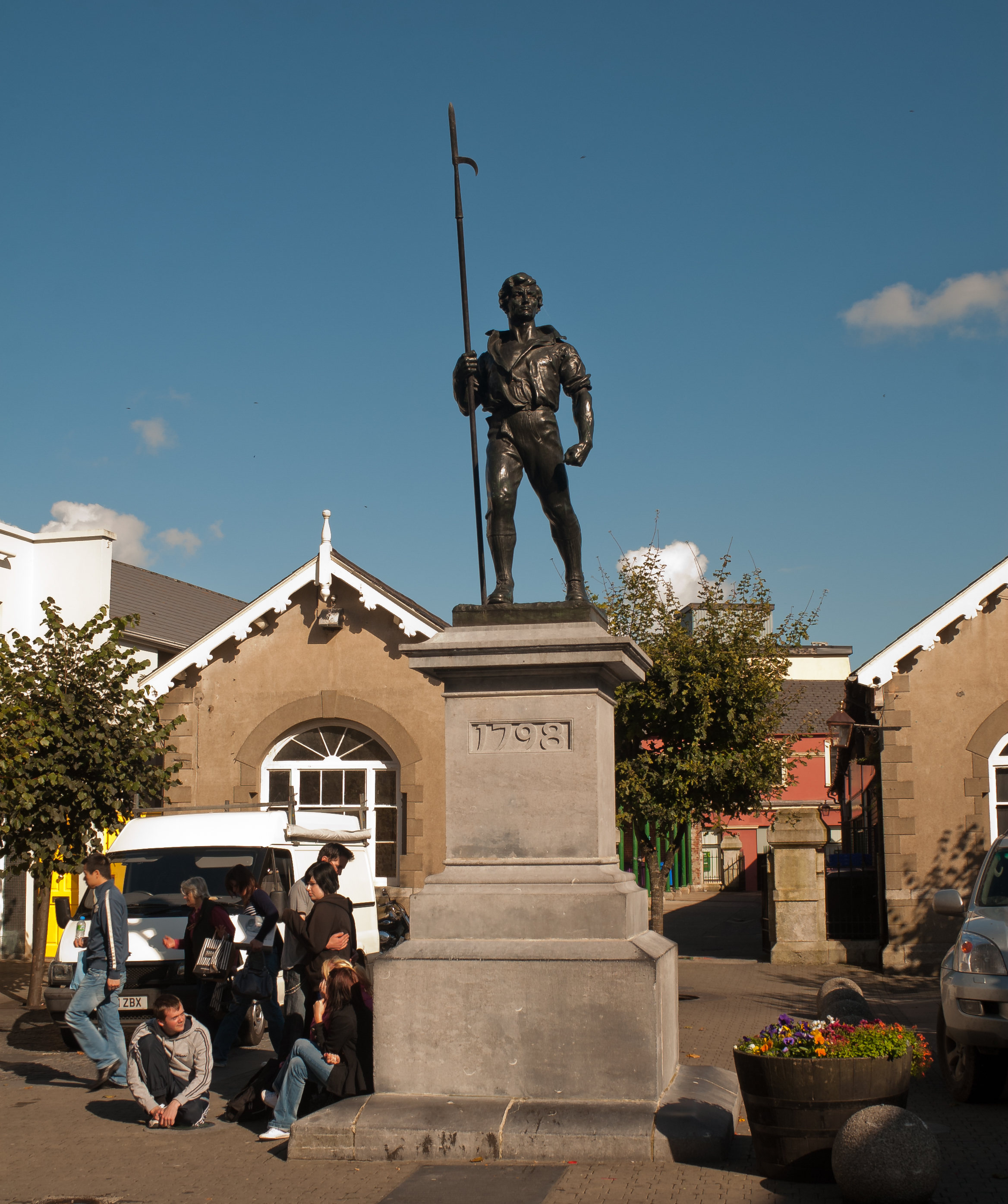
The "Pikeman" statue, a 1798 Rebellion memorial in Wexford town. A Wexford county flag has been "added" to the statue; 1798 and the rebel tradition form an important part of Wexford identity.

Since 1951, an opera festival, Wexford Festival Opera, takes place annually in Wexford town. In 2008, a new Opera House replaced the old one on the same site, once called the Wexford Opera House, but in 2014 being designated as Ireland's National Opera House. It consists of two theatres, the O'Reilly Theatre and the Jerome Hynes Theatre.

There is a renowned singing tradition in County Wexford. Having an abundance of traditional songs, many of which relate to the rebellion of 1798, the county has for many years had a strong presence in the Irish traditional singing scene. Noted singers include All-Ireland Fleadh Champions Paddy Berry, Seamus Brogan and Niall Wall. Paddy Berry has also collected and published a number of songs from Wexford.

Beaches in Curracloe, County Wexford were used to film the opening scenes of the movie Saving Private Ryan, which depicted the D-day assault on Omaha Beach. The Count of Monte Cristo, directed by Kevin Reynolds, was partly filmed in the village of Duncannon in 2000 – Duncannon Fort being used for one of the main scenes. The movie Brooklyn was partially set and filmed in Enniscorthy and featured some of the locals as extras. Both The Violent Enemy and Underground were shot in and around Enniscorthy in the 1960s.

== Media ==
Two radio stations are based in the county: South East Radio and Beat 102-103.

The county's main newspapers include Wexford People, New Ross Standard, Gorey Guardian, and Enniscorthy Echo.

== Places of interest ==
The scenic Bannow Drive, popular amongst tourists, is a signposted route through four Wexford villages: Duncormick, Cullenstown, Bannow and Wellingtonbridge.

Ballyteigue Burrow, located near Duncormick, is a protected sand dune system with wildflowers, wildlife and butterflies. The 9 km (6 mile) coastal stretch is a protected nature reserve nearby Ballyteigue Bay.

The Hook Peninsula is noted for its many beaches and spectacular scenery. It features the medieval Hook Head lighthouse and the historic townland of Loftus Hall.

Popular beaches are located at Courtown, Curracloe, Carnsore Point, Duncannon and Rosslare Strand.

Other places of interest include:

- Ballyhack Castle
- Ballyteigue Castle
- Bannow Church (dates from the 13th century)
- Boolavogue
- The Browne-Clayton Monument
- Castleboro House
- Dollar Bay
- Dunbrody Abbey
- Duncannon Fort
- Enniscorthy Castle and Museum
- Ferns Castle and Abbey
- Loftus Hall – Abandoned haunted house (the first hall was built on this site in 1350) www.loftushall.ie
- Irish National Heritage Park (Ferrycarrig)
- J.F. Kennedy homestead and park
- Johnstown Castle
- National 1798 Visitor Centre
- Oulart Hill
- Saltee Islands
- Selskar Abbey, Wexford town
- The Seven 'Castles' of Clonmines
- Slade Castle
- Slieve Coilte
- St. Mary's Church, New Ross
- Tacumshin windmill (southeast County Wexford)
- Tintern Abbey
- Vinegar Hill
- Wells House and Gardens

== Economy ==
=== Agriculture ===
Cattle near Duncormick

The economy is chiefly agricultural. Cattle, sheep, pig rearing and some horse breeding are the main types of husbandry practised. Poultry rearing, once popular, has very much declined. Wheat, barley, rapeseed, and oats are grown, as are potatoes. Sugar beet is no longer grown due to the withdrawal of EU subsidies. The numbers involved in farming have been declining for many years and many of the seasonal workers are now eastern Europeans. Mushrooms are also grown indoors. Tomatoes are grown under glass, for example at Campile.

Wexford strawberries are famous and can be bought in shops and wayside stalls throughout the summer. Every year, near the end of June, a 'Strawberry Fair' Festival takes place in the town of Enniscorthy, and a Strawberry Queen is crowned. Dairy farming forms an important part of the agricultural industry. Locally produced milk is on sale in many supermarkets. Wexford Irish Cheddar is a brand, and Carrigbyrne, a full-flavoured soft cheese, is produced near New Ross.

=== Forestry ===
Evergreen tree species are extensively cultivated, especially in more recent years—Norway spruce and Sitka spruce are the most common varieties planted. These are generally sown on poorer quality soils (mainly in bogs and on hills or mountainsides). A small amount of deciduous trees are also planted, though these require better soils.

=== Mining ===
Silver was once mined at Clonmines—primarily in Tudor times. Lead was mined at Caim, 1818 – c. 1850—this mine also contains zinc; the two are usually found together. Copper ore (malachite) is found at Kerloge, just south of the town of Wexford. Iron is found in small quantities at Courtown Harbour. The county is not noted for mineral reserves. No significant mining activity is currently practised, with the exception of quarrying for stone. In 2007, a significant oil find was made 60 km (37 mi) off Hook Head in County Wexford.

=== Energy ===
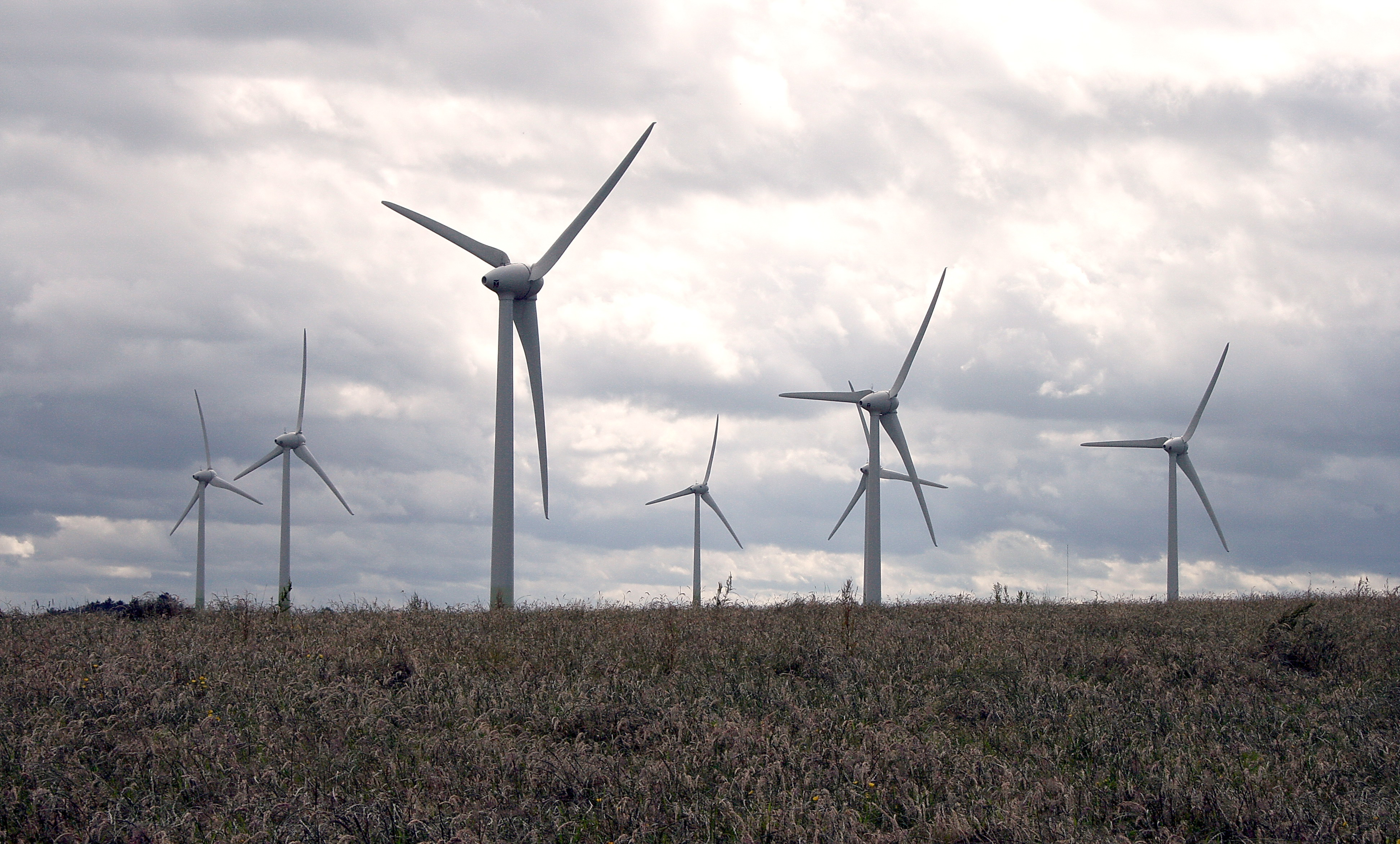
Ballywater Wind Farm, near Kilmuckridge – the largest wind farm in County Wexford (consisting of 21 wind turbines).

Carnsore Point made the national headlines in the late 1970s after a proposal was made to build a nuclear energy plant there; the plans were abandoned after extensive protests from the public, due to environmental and health concerns. Great Island Power Station opened in 1967 and was operated by the Electricity Supply Board (ESB) until it was sold to Endesa in January 2009. It is an electricity-generating station fueled by heavy fuel oil and rated at 240 MW. It is located at the confluence of the rivers Barrow and Suir, near Campile. Before its sale, the station was scheduled to close by 2010. Endesa propose building a 430 MW combined cycle gas turbine (CCGT) gas fired plant on the site. The project would need a new 44.5 km (27.7 mi) gas pipeline from the existing transmission network at Baunlusk, 6 km (3.7 mi) south of Kilkenny City. A wind farm has now been built on the site, featuring 14 wind turbines generating electricity. It began operations in 2003. Wind farms now exist at a few other locations in the county, such as Ballywater Wind Farm, at Cahore (near Kilmuckridge), on the county's east coast, and Richfield wind farm, located in the southeast of the county.

== Transport ==
- Bus: Wexford and Dublin are linked by Bus Éireann route 2 and Wexford Bus routes 740 and 740A. While route 5 operates Waterford-New Ross-Enniscorthy-Dublin. There are numerous local bus routes radiating from Wexford town to places such as Kilmore Quay, Lady's Island, Kilmuckridge.
- Rail: The Rosslare–Dublin railway line runs through the county, serving Rosslare Europort, Rosslare Strand, Wexford, Enniscorthy and Gorey. Four trains run in each direction daily (three at weekends), with additional commuter services from Gorey. The Rosslare–Limerick railway line which traverses the southern part of the county is now mothballed but being maintained (it served stations at Bridgetown, Wellington Bridge, Ballycullane and Campile).
- Ferry: Rosslare Europort, located at Rosslare Harbour, operates a busy ferry service. There are regular sailings to Wales (Pembroke and Fishguard) and France (Cherbourg and in the summer months to Roscoff) for passengers and vehicles. There is also ferry service in operation between Ballyhack and Passage East (County Waterford), crossing the Barrow estuary.

== Sport and events ==
=== Gaelic games ===
In recent years the county Football team has been making rapid advances. Camogie, a women's version of hurling, is also played, and Wexford won the All Ireland in 2007, 2010, 2011 and 2012. Chadwicks Wexford Park is the county's main GAA pitch, holding 25,000 supporters as of 2020. Also, handball is played on a limited basis; there are a number of handball alleys located throughout the county.

As a county, Wexford are most noted for hurling have won the Leinster Senior Hurling Championships a total of 21 times, first in 1890 and most recently in 2019.

In the All Ireland Senior Hurling Championships, Wexford have won 6 times, first in 1910 and most recently in 1996, beating Limerick in the final.

=== Football ===
Wexford Youths F.C., formed 2007, renamed as Wexford FC in 2017, is the major football club in the county, currently playing in the League of Ireland First Division.

=== Golf ===
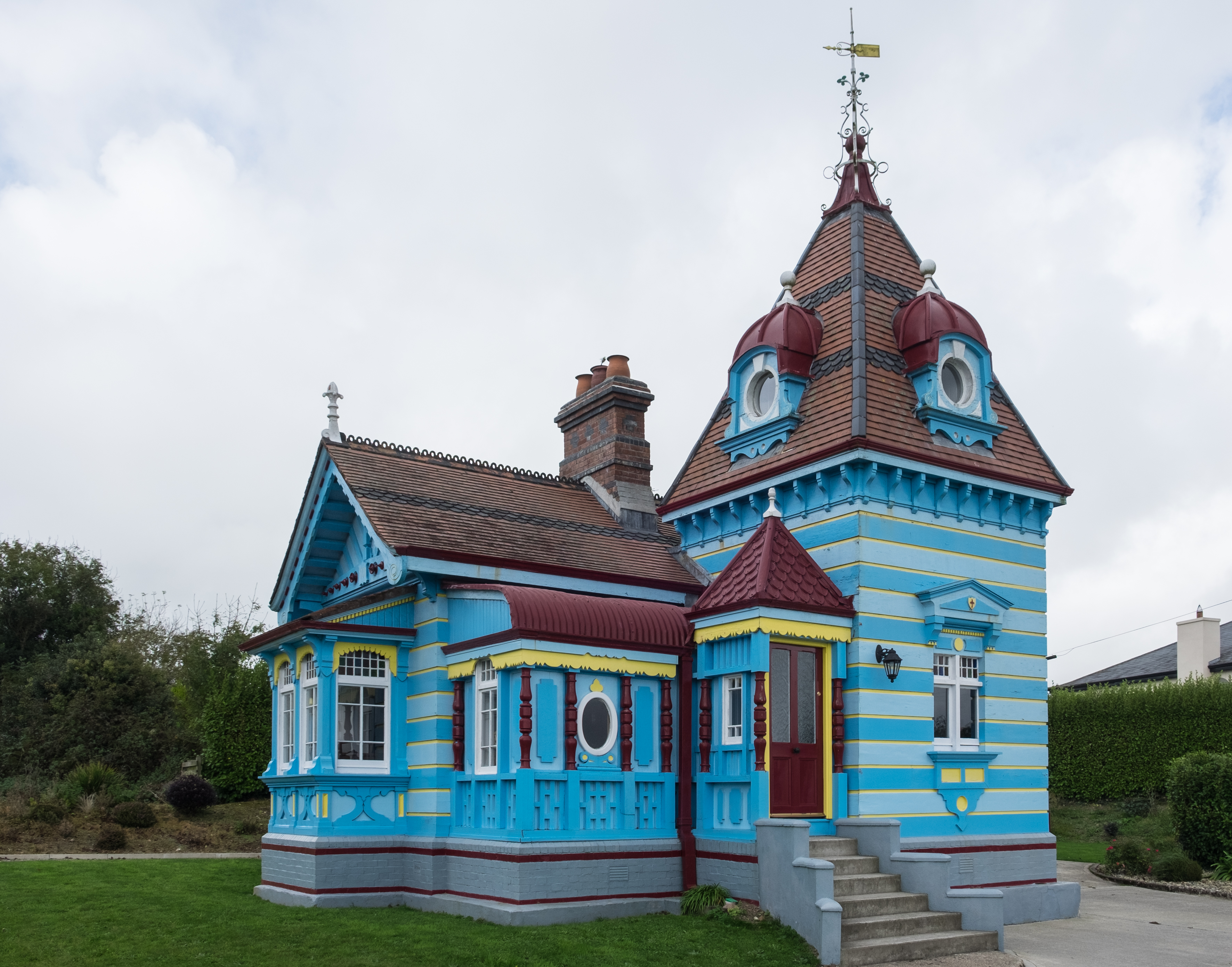
The colourful lodge at the entrance to Rathaspeck Manor golf course

There are numerous golf clubs in the county – including Rosslare (a Links course), and Enniscorthy. Two more are located near Gorey – Ballymoney Golf Club and Courtown Golf Club – are 18 hole golf courses. Bunclody Golf and Fishing Club, boasting Europe's only golf lift, is situated just inside County Carlow. There are also a few others. New Ross Golf Club, however, is actually located in County Kilkenny – about 1 km (1,000 yards) from New Ross town.

There are also many par-3 courses in the county, such as Scarke Golf Course & Driving Range, located about 2 km (1.2 mi) east of New Ross, the 'Abbey Par 3' course, at Winningtown, Fethard-on-Sea, Blackwater Par 3 Golf Course, Kilnew, Blackwater, located a few kilometres northeast of Wexford town, Garrylough Golf Course and Driving Range, Screen, and Rathaspeck Manor Golf Course, Rathaspeck, near Rosslare (there are also few Par-4 holes on this course). There are also a number of other Par-3 courses in the county.

=== Fishing ===
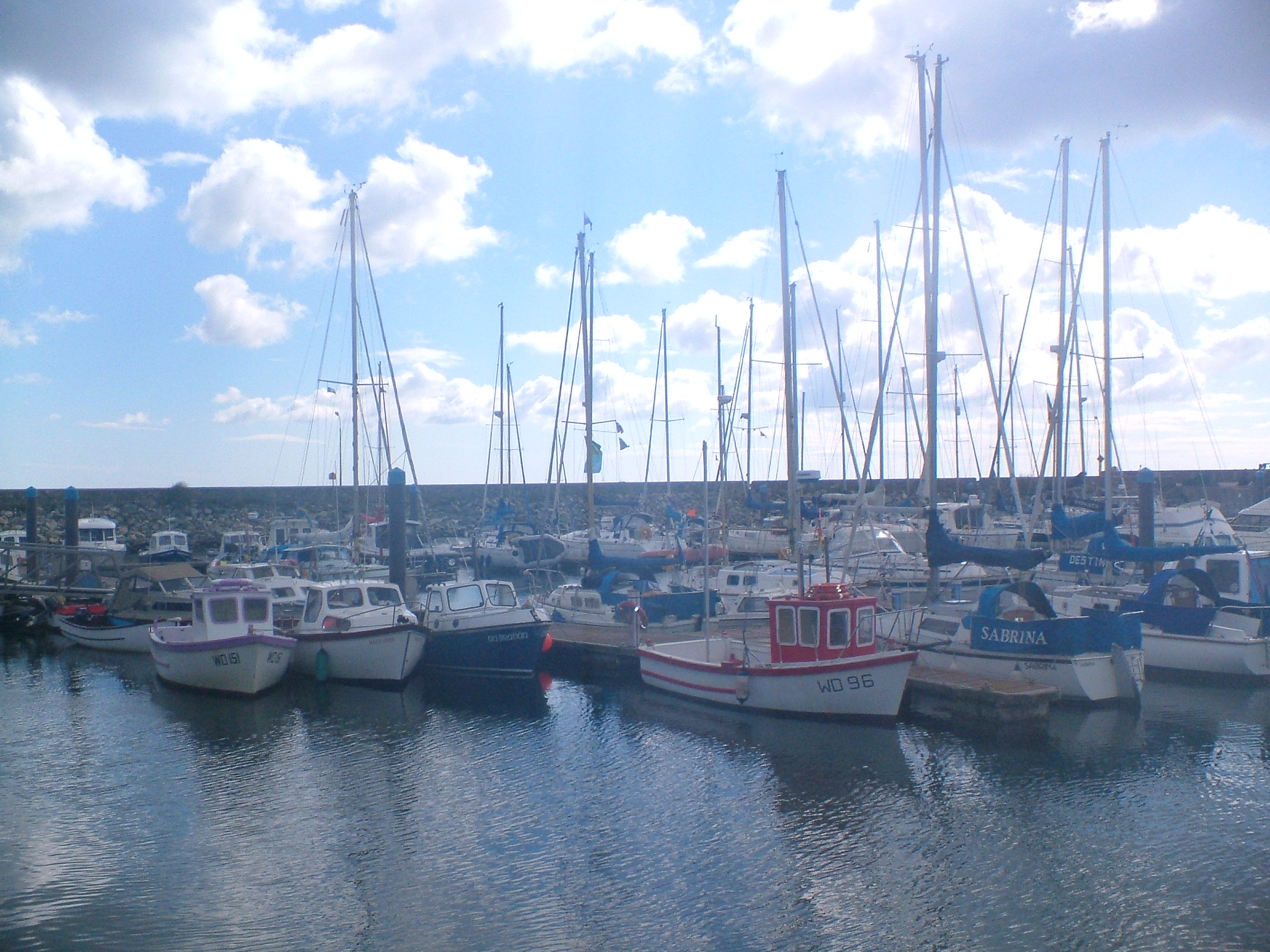
The Marina at Kilmore Quay.

Maritime activity takes at various locations in County Wexford, including at Kilmore Quay and Slade Harbour. Common fish species include herring, mackerel, cod, monkfish, whiting, bass, perch, gurnard, haddock, mullet, pollock, John Dory, sole, conger eel, shad, salmon, trout, pike, carp, and tench. Shellfish include mussels, cockles, periwinkles, clams, and oysters.

=== Racing ===
Wexford Racecourse (horse racing) is in Wexford town and there is a Greyhound Racing track at Enniscorthy.

== People ==
- Bunny Ahearne – president of the International Ice Hockey Federation
- Michael Balfe – 19th-century composer, grew up in Wexford
- John Banville – novelist (2005 Booker Prize and 2013 Austrian State Prize for European Literature)
- Major G. E. H. Barrett-Hamilton – zoologist, grew up in Kilmanock
- John Barry – Commander in the United States Navy
- Paddy Berry – singer, song collector and folklorist
- Wallis Bird – musician
- Des Bishop – New York-raised comedian, went to school in County Wexford
- Jim Bolger ONZ – former Prime Minister of New Zealand.
- Jim Bolger (racehorse trainer) – horse trainer.
- Myles Byrne – participant in the Irish Rebellion of 1798
- Thomas Cloney – participant in the Irish Rebellion of 1798
- John Henry Colclough – participant in the Irish Rebellion of 1798
- Eoin Colfer – best-selling writer of children's literature
- Brendan Corish – Irish Labour Party leader and Tánaiste
- Richard Corish – Trade Unionist
- Gordon D'Arcy- Rugby player, Leinster & Ireland
- Tadhg Furlong- Rugby player, Leinster & Ireland
- Francis Danby – 19th-century painter
- Chris de Burgh – Argentinian-born singer-songwriter, based in County Wexford
- Pádraic Delaney – actor
- John Doran (British Army officer)
- Anne Doyle – RTÉ newsreader
- Kevin Doyle – football player
- Mary Fitzgerald (trade unionist)
- Nicholas French – former RC Bishop of Ferns
- Nicholas Furlong – writer, journalist and historian
- Eileen Gray – 20th-century Irish furniture designer and architect and a pioneer of the Modern Movement in architecture, raised in Enniscorthy
- Anna Maria Hall (Mrs. S.C. Hall) – 19th-century novelist, raised in Bannow
- John Harrison – recipient of the Victoria Cross
- Beauchamp Bagenal Harvey – participant in the Irish Rebellion of 1798
- Edward Hay – writer of a history of the Irish Rebellion of 1798
- Herbert Hore – historian
- William Kehoe – iron founder
- Bridget Murphy (Kennedy) – great-grandmother of John F. Kennedy (former president of the United States).
- Patrick Kennedy – great-grandfather of John F. Kennedy (former president of the United States).
- Father John Murphy – participant in the Irish Rebellion of 1798.
- Col. Joshua Nunn – veterinarian and barrister
- Aidan O'Brien – horse trainer
- Joseph O'Brien (jockey) – son of Aidan O'Brien and horse trainer, formerly jockey
- Thomas O'Connor (rancher) – Irish rancher and landowner
- Michael O'Hanrahan – Irish rebel executed for fighting in the 1916 Easter Rising.
- Chris O'Neill – animator/musician and online entertainer
- Nicky Rackard – hurling player
- John Redmond – 19th- 20th-century nationalist politician
- Billy Roche – playwright
- Dick Roche – politician
- Patrick Roche – politician
- James Ryan – politician and Irish Revolutionary
- Martin Storey – hurling player
- Colm Tóibín – novelist (2006 International Dublin Literary Award)
- Maverick Sabre – singer/songwriter
- Joseph Whitty - Irish Republican who died on hunger strike

== Twinning ==
County Wexford is twinned with the following places:

- Yanga, Veracruz, Mexico

== See also ==
- High Sheriff of Wexford
- List of towns and villages in Ireland
- List of abbeys and priories in Ireland (County Wexford)
- Lord Lieutenant of Wexford

== Bibliography ==
- Byrne, Francis J. Irish Kings and High Kings. Dublin, 1973–2001
- Carlyle, Thomas. "Oliver Cromwell's Letters and Speeches". Vol. 1. New York: Wiley & Putnam, 1845
- Colfer, Billy. The County of Wexford. County Wexford: Foillsitheoirí Cois Sláine, n.d. – 1980 or 1981.
- Furlong, Nicholas (2003). A History of County Wexford. Dublin: Gill & MacMillan. ISBN 0-7171-3461-X.
- Furlong, Nicholas; Hayes, John (2005). County Wexford in the Rare Oul' Times. Vol. IV. 1910–1924. Wexford: Old Distillery Press. ISBN 0-9512812-3-2.
- Giraldus Cambrensis. Expugnatio Hibernica – The Conquest of Ireland. Dublin: R.I.A., 1978
- Ordnance Survey Ireland (OSi). Discovery Series 77 – Co Wexford (part). Scale 1: 50,000. Dublin: OSI, Phoenix Park, 1997. ISBN 0-904996-71-9
- The Times Atlas of the World – Reference Edition. London: Times Books, 1995–2002. ISBN 0-00-712400-7
- Whelan, K.(ed) & W. Nolan (assoc. ed.). Wexford: History and Society. Dublin: Geography Publications, 1987
