= New Ross Golf Club =

Golf club in County Wexford, Ireland

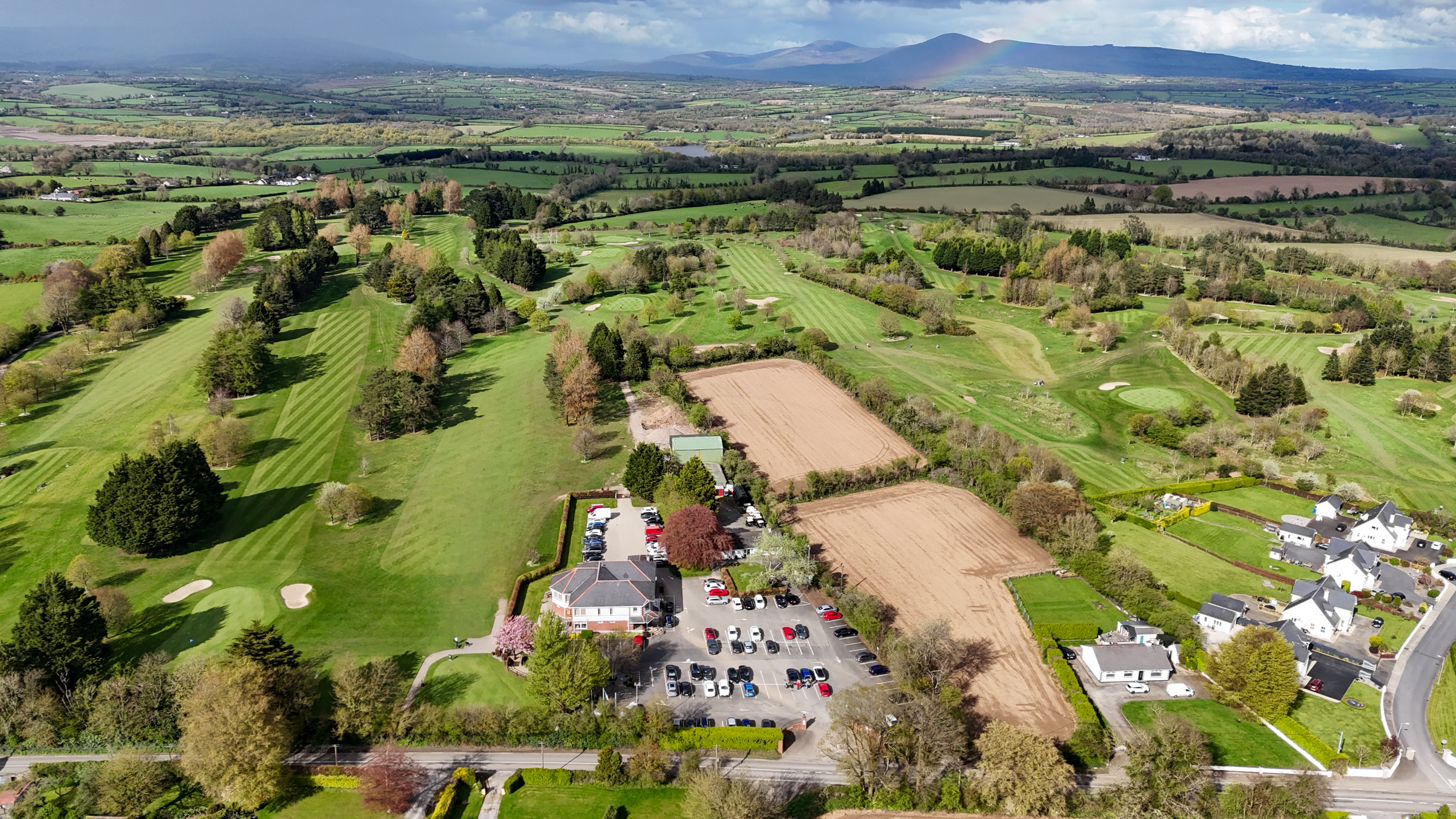
- Interactive map of New Ross Golf Club
- 52.403529°N 6.973009°W

Club information
- Location: County Wexford
- Established: 1905
- Total holes: 18
- Website: www.newrossgolfclub.ie
- Designed by: Des Smyth
- Par: 70
- Length: 5795m

New Ross Golf Club is an Irish golf club founded in 1905 and based in Tinneranny, New Ross, County Wexford, Ireland. The club's slogan is "A Pleasure to Play".

== History ==
The land for a nine-hole golf course was acquired on Mockler's estate at Castle Annaghs, under a lease with a seven-year duration. The course was briefly relocated to the estate of Reggie Jeffares at Tinneranny in 1917, but follow Jeffares death in 1918, that lease was not renewed. The course was reopened at Annaghs in 1926 before that lease was terminated, and another course was laid out at Chilcomb Park, the present site of the Albatross factory. In 1928, the Land Commission acquired the Jeffares estate, and the Club had a permanent home under a sporting lease until 1983, when the member agreed to buy the property outright.

The period from 1991 to 1997 was probably the most progressive period in the historical development of New Ross Golf Club. In 1992, the club was among the first member clubs to grant equal rights to women. Plans were drafted to build the current clubhouse in 1997. The clubhouse was completed and opened to members in 1998.

In 2005, its centenary year, it was decided to redesign the 11th hole building a brand new green. The 18th green was also re-designed. Further redevelopment of the 12th, 13th, 15th and 16th greens commenced in September 2008 and is due to be completed and open to play in May 2009.

== The Course ==
The back nine has been in play for over a century, while the front nine opened in 1995. The newer nine was designed by Des Smyth and Declan Brannigan. The Blackstairs Mountains, which stretch fifteen miles from Dranagh to Mount Leinster and separating counties Carlow and Wexford, are visible from the 11th green.

In 2009, the club won the Association of Land Contractors of Ireland Award after redesigning four new greens on its course.

== See also ==
- New Ross Golf Club website
