= Henry G. Butler =

Newfoundland politician

Henry G. Butler (1769 – September 2, 1847) was an English-born magistrate and political figure in Newfoundland. He represented Burin in the Newfoundland and Labrador House of Assembly from 1837 to 1842.

He was born in Salisbury, Wiltshire and came to Newfoundland while still young. Butler was one of the commissioners who delivered St. Pierre to the French in 1814 following the Treaty of Paris. After retiring from politics, he served as a stipendiary magistrate at Lamaline, where he died in 1847.
