= Henry Butler (viol player) =

English composer and viol player

Henry Butler (born in England, died 1652 in Spain) was an English composer and viol player. From 1623 until his death he lived in Spain, serving as a musician in the chapel of Philip IV, under the names Enrique (or Enrrique) Botelero and Enrico Butler.

Butler and William Young, an English viol player working at the Austrian court in Innsbruck, were the first English composers to call their works sonatas. Young published 11 sonatas in 1653, whereas all of Butler's works have survived only in undated manuscripts. His three sonatas were for violin, bass viol and continuo.

The three sonatas have been recorded by The Newberry Consort.
