= North Slob =

Mudflats in County Wexford, Ireland

North Slob An Slaba Thuaidh
- Natural Reserve
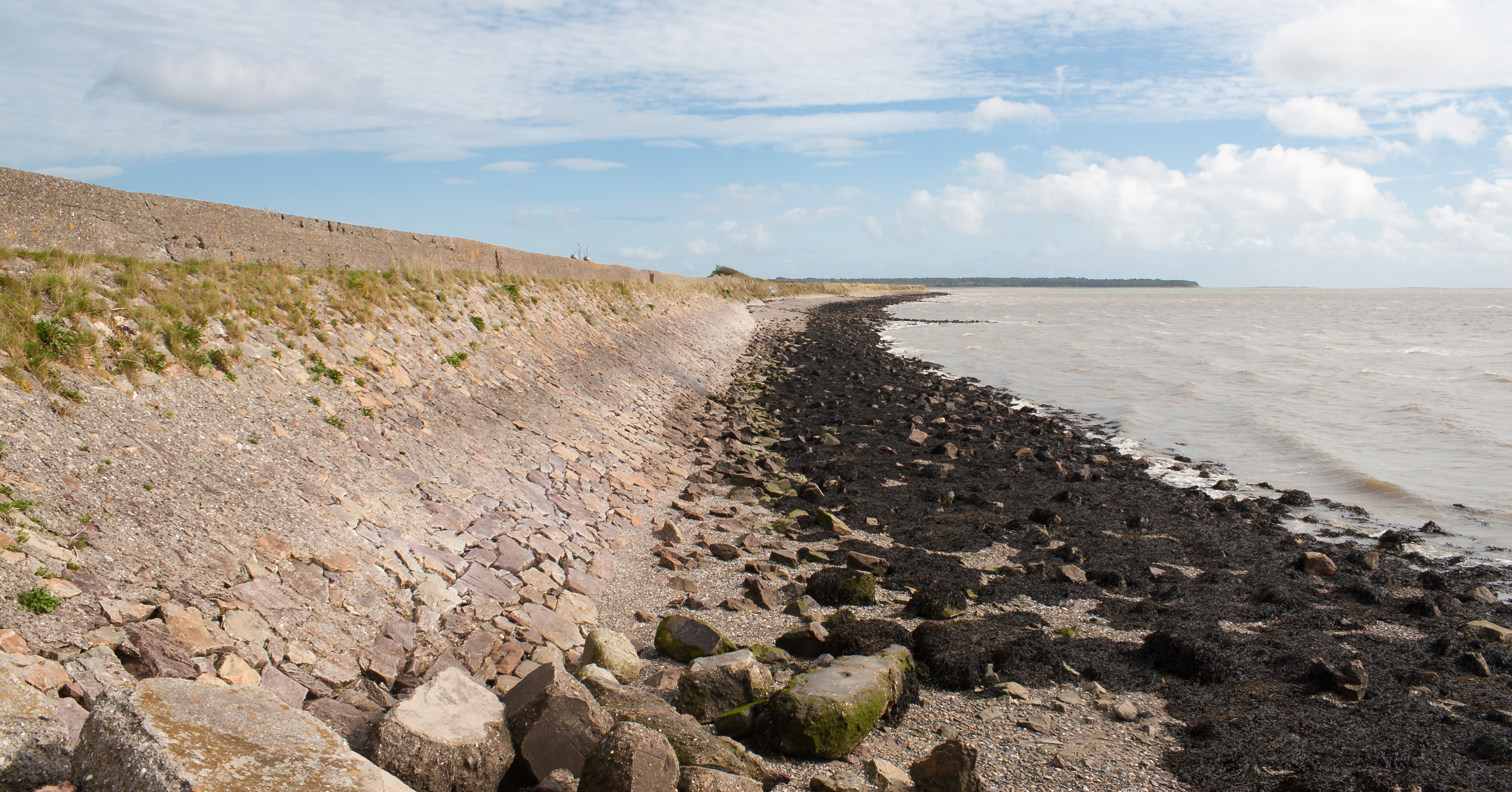
- North Slob seawall

- Location in Ireland
- Coordinates: 52°23′N 6°23′W
- Country: Ireland
- Province: Leinster
- County: County Wexford
- Time zone: UTC+0 (WET)
  - Summer (DST): UTC+1 (IST (WEST))

Designations

Ramsar Wetland
- Official name: Wexford Wildfowl Reserve
- Designated: 15 November 1984
- Reference no.: 291

The North Slob is an area of mud-flats at the estuary of the River Slaney at Wexford Harbour, Ireland. The North Slob is an area of 10 km^{2} (2,500 acres) that was reclaimed in the mid-19th century by the building of a sea wall.

2 km^{2} (490 acres) of this reclaimed land is a nature reserve that is jointly owned and managed by BirdWatch Ireland and the National Parks and Wildlife Service (NPWS) as the Wexford Wildfowl Reserve (Irish: Anaclann Éanlaith Fiáin Loch Garman). The reserve is open to the public.

== Wildlife ==
The North Slob provides the winter home for 10,000 Greenland white-fronted geese (Anser albifrons flavirostris), about one third of the world population of this subspecies, which migrate to Greenland for the summer months.

=== International recognition ===
The Wexford Wildfowl Reserve was designated a Ramsar site in 1984. The North Slob is part of the Wexford Harbour Special Protection Area of 27.34 km^{2} (10.56 sq mi; 6,760 acres).

== Guinness World Records ==
Guinness World Records, known until 2000 as The Guinness Book of Records, has its origins in the North Slob. On 4 May 1951, Sir Hugh Beaver, then the managing director of the Guinness Breweries, was on a shooting party in the North Slob when he became involved in an argument over which was the fastest game bird in Europe, the golden plover or the grouse. That evening at Castlebridge House he realised that it was impossible to confirm in reference books whether or not the golden plover was Europe's fastest game bird. He knew that there must be numerous other questions debated nightly in pubs in Britain and Ireland, but there was no book with which to settle arguments about records. He realised then that a book supplying the answers to this sort of question might prove popular.

The North Slob featured on the Open University and the BBC's Coast Programme.
