= Monageer =

Monageer Móin na gCaor (Irish)
- Village
- Location in Ireland
- Coordinates: 52°31′51″N 6°28′24″W
- Country: Ireland
- Province: Leinster
- County: Wexford
- Time zone: UTC+0 (WET)
  - Summer (DST): UTC-1 (IST (WEST))
- Area code: 053

Monageer (Irish: Móin na gCaor), or Monagear, is a small village situated in the centre of County Wexford, in Ireland. It is located a few kilometres roughly northeast of Enniscorthy town.

Monageer village contains a shop, a pub, a primary school, and a Roman Catholic church (with adjoining cemetery). It also contains the local GAA club Monageer Boolavogue which was founded in 1886. A sensory path and grotto walk was opened in 2018.

== People ==
Peter Daly was an Irish Socialist and Republican who fought in the Irish War of Independence as well as serving as a volunteer in the Spanish Civil War, where he died serving with the International Brigades. Born in Liverpool in 1903, his family returned to Monageer at the end of 1911. There is a memorial in Monageer commemorating his life and struggle.

== See also ==
- List of towns and villages in Ireland
