= Governor of Duncannon Fort =

British military appointment

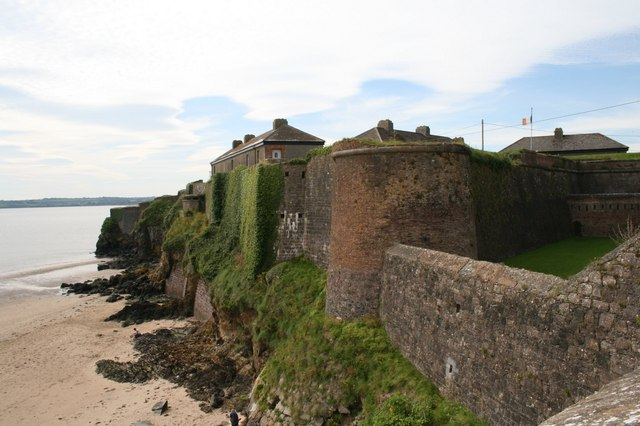
Modern view of Duncannon Fort

The Governor of Duncannon Fort was a military officer who commanded the garrison at Duncannon in County Wexford. In later years the post became a sinecure and was abolished on the death of the last holder in 1835.

== List of governors ==
- Sir Cary Reynolds
- Sir John Brockett
- Sir John Dowdall
- 1604–1606: Sir Josias Bodley
- 1606–1646: Laurence Esmonde, 1st Baron Esmonde
- Thomas Roche
- 1649–1650: Edward Wogan
- 1650–1654: Maj. Overstreet
- 1654–1659: Capt. Betts (Bates)
- 1659–: Col. Simon Rugeley
- 1690–1698: Sir James Jefferyes
- 1698–1711: Toby Purcell
- 1711–1728: Robert Stearne
- 1728–1735: Philip Honywood
- 1735–1740: Charles Cathcart, 8th Lord Cathcart
- 1741–1751: Gervais Parker
- 1751–1767: John Leslie, 10th Earl of Rothes
- 1768–1782: Lord Robert Bertie
- 1782–1795: James Johnston
- 1795–1802: Sir Robert Sloper
- 1802–1814: Ralph Dundas
- 1814–1835: Sir John Hamilton

== See also ==
- Siege of Duncannon
