= Giles Quay Lifeboat Station =

Former lifeboat station in County Louth, Ireland

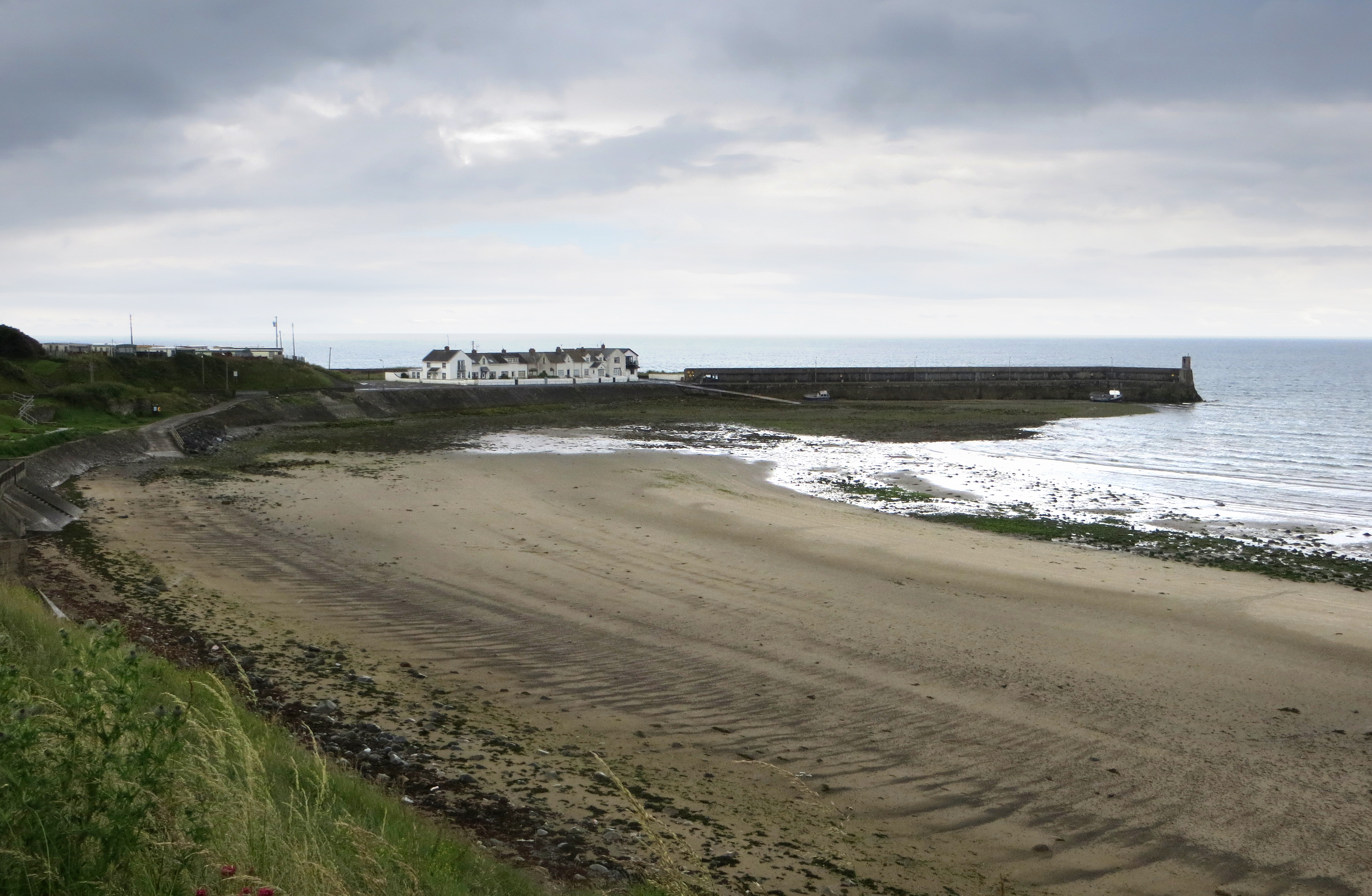
- Gyles Quay

- Gyles Quay, County Louth
- Alternative names: Dundalk (Giles Quay)

General information
- Status: Closed
- Type: RNLI Lifeboat Station
- Location: Gyles' Quay, County Louth, A91 X382, Ireland
- Coordinates: 53°59′07.2″N 6°14′17.9″W
- Opened: 1879
- Closed: 1912

Giles Quay Lifeboat Station was located in Gyles' Quay, a village overlooking Dundalk Bay, sitting on the southern shore of the Cooley Peninsula in County Louth, on the east coast of Ireland.

A lifeboat station was established at Giles Quay by the Royal National Lifeboat Institution (RNLI) in 1879, one of two stations that have been home to the "Dundalk Lifeboat", the other being at Blackrock.

After operating for 43 years, Giles Quay Lifeboat Station closed in 1912.

== History ==
Even before there was a lifeboat at Giles Quay, medals were awarded by the RNLI for gallantry. On 6 April 1858, the barque Mary Stoddart was seen in distress in Dundalk Bay. Numerous attempts were made over 5 days to rescue the crew. Finally, H.M. Coastguard Chief Boatman Robert Shankey and his boat crew set out from Giles Quay and rescued seven men on the 9 April. On the 10 April, they rescued the remaining survivors, although a further seven crew of the Mary Stoddart had been lost. No fewer than 10 RNLI Silver Medals were awarded for the numerous attempts made to save the crew. Shankey was awarded not one, but two silver medals (silver medal plus second-service clasp) for his efforts on two days.

At certain times of the day, the tide was preventing any launch of the lifeboat from Dundalk Lifeboat Station at Blackrock, County Louth, on the south side of the bay. Following a visit to the village by the second Assistant Inspector of Lifeboats in 1876, a site at Giles Quay (now Gyles' Quay), on the north side of Dundalk Bay, was under consideration for the relocation of the lifeboat, "in which position the boat would be two miles from the bar, but to windward of it, and able to launch at any time of tide."

A quote of £205 for the construction of a new boathouse from a Mr. Matthews was accepted by the RNLI, finally costing £325-4s with slipway, and the 32-foot self-righting 'Pulling and Sailing' (P&S) lifeboat, one with oars and sails, Stockport Sunday Schools, was transferred over to the new station at Giles Quay in 1879. The lifeboat station at Blackrock was closed.

The first rescue was on 9 February 1880. The Giles Quay lifeboat launched to the brigantine Andover of Dublin, on voyage from Limerick to Liverpool, and stranded 1 mile (1.6 km) from Dundalk Lighthouse. After taking off six people, the lifeboat went out again the following day, assisting with the refloat. Coxswain (and Pilot) Thomas Gallagher then took charge of the vessel, and arranged a tug to get the vessel to harbour.

Almost immediately, the decision of relocating the lifeboat was already under review, and even as soon as 1880, it was decided to reopen the station at Blackrock, now to be known as "Dundalk No.2 Lifeboat Station", but also to retain the new Giles Quay station.

A new Giles Quay lifeboat, a 34-foot self-righting (P&S) lifeboat, costing £343, was delivered to Greenore on 25 August 1880, and then sailed onwards to Giles Quay by its crew. The cost of the lifeboat and equipment was defrayed from the bequest of the late Miss Louisa Thomas of Bowdon, Cheshire, and was named James Thomas in memory of her late father.

The Stockport Sunday Schools lifeboat was returned to Blackrock, but not before a lifeboat race was held between the two crews, the Blackrock crew emerging victors after a restarted race.

James Thomas was launched to the brigantine Jean Anderson of Dundalk on 18 November 1882, bound from Ardrossan, and driven ashore on the east side of Dundalk Bar. The lifeboat stood by for four hours until the crew decided to abandon ship, and six men were rescued.

A third boat would be provided to Giles Quay in 1891. This was the Providence (ON 310), a 34-foot 10-oared lifeboat, with sliding keel and water ballast tanks, provided from the legacy of the late Charles Pooley of Cheltenham.

The Providence was launched to the aid of the schooner Violet of Castletown, Isle of Man, aground on the North Bull. As the ship broke up, the crew of four managed to get to the North Bull beacon, and were rescued from there. It was said that "All the ducks in Europe" had arrived, to feed on the lost cargo of barley.

There were only two calls for the Giles Quay lifeboat after 1899, and at a meeting of the RNLI committee of management on Thursday 13 June 1912, it was decided to close Giles Quay Lifeboat Station. The lifeboat had been called just 12 times in 33 years, but had rescued 19 people.

The boathouse at Gyles Quay still exists, and is now a much modified private residence. The lifeboat on station at the time of closure, Providence (ON 310), was stored at Howth for a further year, before being sold from service.

== Station honours ==
The following are awards made at Giles Quay.

- RNLI Silver Medal

Robert Shankey, Chief Boatman, H.M. Coastguard, Dundalk – 1858
Robert Shankey, Chief Boatman, H.M. Coastguard, Dundalk – 1858 (Second-Service clasp)

== Giles Quay lifeboats ==
=== Pulling and Sailing (P&S) lifeboats ===
ON (Note: ON is the RNLI's Official Number of the boat.)	Name	Built	On station	Class	Comments
Pre-499	Stockport Sunday Schools	1867	1879−1880	32-foot Prowse Self-righting (P&S)	(Note: 32-foot x 7-foot 6in (10-oared) Prowse-class self-righting (P&S) lifeboat, gift of Stockport Sunday Schools LB fund, built by Forrestt of Limehouse, London, costing £246.); Previously at Blackrock.
Pre-649	James Thomas	1880	1880−1891	34-foot Self-righting (P&S)	(Note: 34-foot x 8-foot 3in (10-oared) self-righting (P&S) lifeboat, legacy of Miss L. Thomas of Bowdon, Cheshire, built by Woolfe of Shadwell, London, costing £363.)
310	Providence	1890	1891−1912	34-foot Self-righting (P&S)	(Note: 34-foot x 8-foot (10-oared) self-righting (P&S) lifeboat, legacy of Mr C. Pooley of Cheltenham, built by Forrestt of Limehouse, London, costing £427.)

Pre ON numbers are unofficial numbers used by the Lifeboat Enthusiast Society to reference early lifeboats not included on the official RNLI list.

== See also ==
- List of RNLI stations
- List of former RNLI stations
- Royal National Lifeboat Institution lifeboats
