= Siege of Waterford =

Siege in southeastern Ireland during 1649 and 1650

Coordinates: 52.2519°N 7.1269°W

- Part of the Cromwellian conquest of Ireland
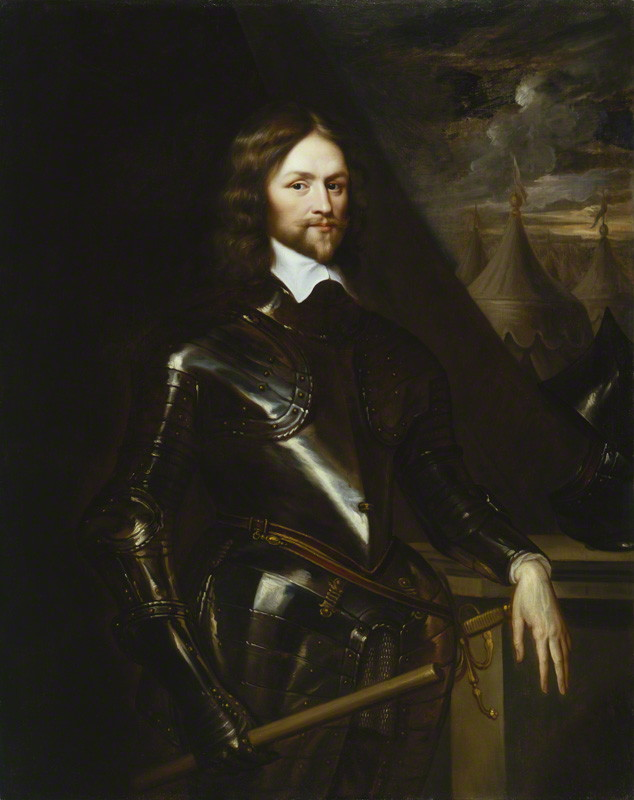
- Henry Ireton, the English Parliamentarian commander who took Waterford in 1650
Date	1st Phase: 24 November – 2 December 1649; 2nd Phase: Late July – 6 August 1650
Location	Waterford
Result	Parliamentarian victory: New Model Army take Waterford after a second siege.

Belligerents
Parliamentarians	Irish Confederation; Royalists

Commanders and leaders
Oliver Cromwell; Michael Jones; Henry Ireton	Richard Farrell; Thomas Preston

Strength
6,000–7,000	3,000

Ireland and Waterford

The city of Waterford in southeastern Ireland was besieged twice during 1649 and 1650 during the Cromwellian conquest of Ireland. The town was held by Irish Confederate Catholic under General Richard Farrell and English Royalist troops under general Thomas Preston. It was besieged by English Parliamentarians under Oliver Cromwell, Michael Jones and Henry Ireton.

== Waterford - a Catholic city 1641–49 ==
Waterford was a Catholic city and like most other towns in Ireland's southeast, the populace had supported the Confederate Catholic cause since the Irish Rebellion of 1641. Late in 1641, Protestant refugees, displaced by the insurgents, began to arrive in the town, creating tension among the Catholic townspeople. The city's mayor wanted to protect the refugees, but the recorder and several of the Aldermen on the city council wanted to strip them of their property and let in the rebels, who arrived outside the walls in early 1642. At first, the Mayor's faction was successful in refusing to admit rebel forces, but by March 1642, the faction in the municipal government sympathetic to the rebellion had prevailed. The Protestants in Waterford were expelled, in most cases put on ships to England, sometimes after having their property looted by the city mob. In 1645 Confederate troops under Thomas Preston besieged and captured nearby Duncannon from its English garrison, thus removing the threat to shipping coming to and from Waterford.

Waterford's political community was noted for its intransigent Catholic politics. In 1646, a synod of Catholic Bishops, based in Waterford, excommunicated any Catholic who supported a treaty between the Confederates and English Royalists, which did not allow for the free practice of the Catholic religion. The Confederates finally agreed a treaty with Charles I of England in 1648, in order to join forces with the Royalists against their common enemy, the English Parliament, which was both anti-Catholic and hostile to the King. The Parliamentarians landed a major expeditionary force in Ireland at Dublin, under Oliver Cromwell in August 1649.

The English Parliamentarian New Model Army arrived to besiege Waterford in October 1649. One of the stated aims of Oliver Cromwell's invasion of Ireland was to punish the Irish for the mistreatment of Protestants in 1641. Given Waterford's history of partisan Catholic politics, this provoked great fear amongst the townspeople. This fear was accentuated by the fate of Drogheda and nearby Wexford which had recently been taken and sacked by Cromwell's forces and their garrisons massacred.

Waterford was very important strategically in the war in Ireland. Its port allowed for the importation of arms and supplies from continental Europe and its geographical position commanded the entrance of the rivers Suir and Barrow.

== First siege November–December 1649 ==
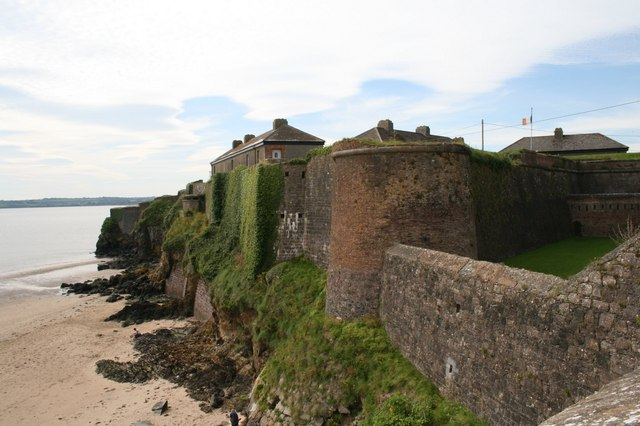
Duncannon Fort

Before besieging Waterford, Oliver Cromwell had to take the surrounding garrisons held by Royalist and Confederate troops in order to secure his lines of communication and supply. Duncannon whose fort commanded the sea passage into Waterford, was besieged by Parliamentarians under Ireton from 15 October to 5 November. However, due to a stubborn defence, the garrison there under Edward Wogan held out. This meant that heavy siege artillery could not be brought up to Waterford by sea.

New Ross surrendered to Cromwell on 19 October and Carrick-on-Suir was taken on 19 November. A counter-attack on Carrick by Irish troops from Ulster under Major Geoghegan was repulsed on 24 November, leaving 500 of the Ulstermen dead.

Having isolated Waterford from the east and north, Cromwell arrived before the city on 24 November. However, Waterford still had access to reinforcements from the west and up to 3000 Irish soldiers (from the Confederate's Ulster Army) under Richard Farrell were fed into the city in the course of a week. Farrell, having been a successful officer in the Spanish army, was highly trained and experienced in siege warfare from battles in Flanders. Cromwell had come up against a superior minded soldier and commander. The weather was extremely cold and wet and the Parliamentarian troops suffered heavily from disease. Out of 6,500 English Parliamentarian soldiers who besieged Waterford in 1649, only 3,000 or so were still fit by the time the siege was called off. Added to this, Cromwell was able to make little headway in taking the city. The capture of a fort at Passage East enabled him to bring up siege guns by sea, but the wet weather meant that it was all but impossible to transport them close enough to Waterford's walls to use them. Farrell proved tactically superior in defending Waterford and repelled Cromwell's attempts. Eventually Cromwell had to call off the siege on 2 December and go into winter quarters at Dungarvan. Among his casualties was his commander Michael Jones, who died of disease.

== Second siege July–August 1650 ==
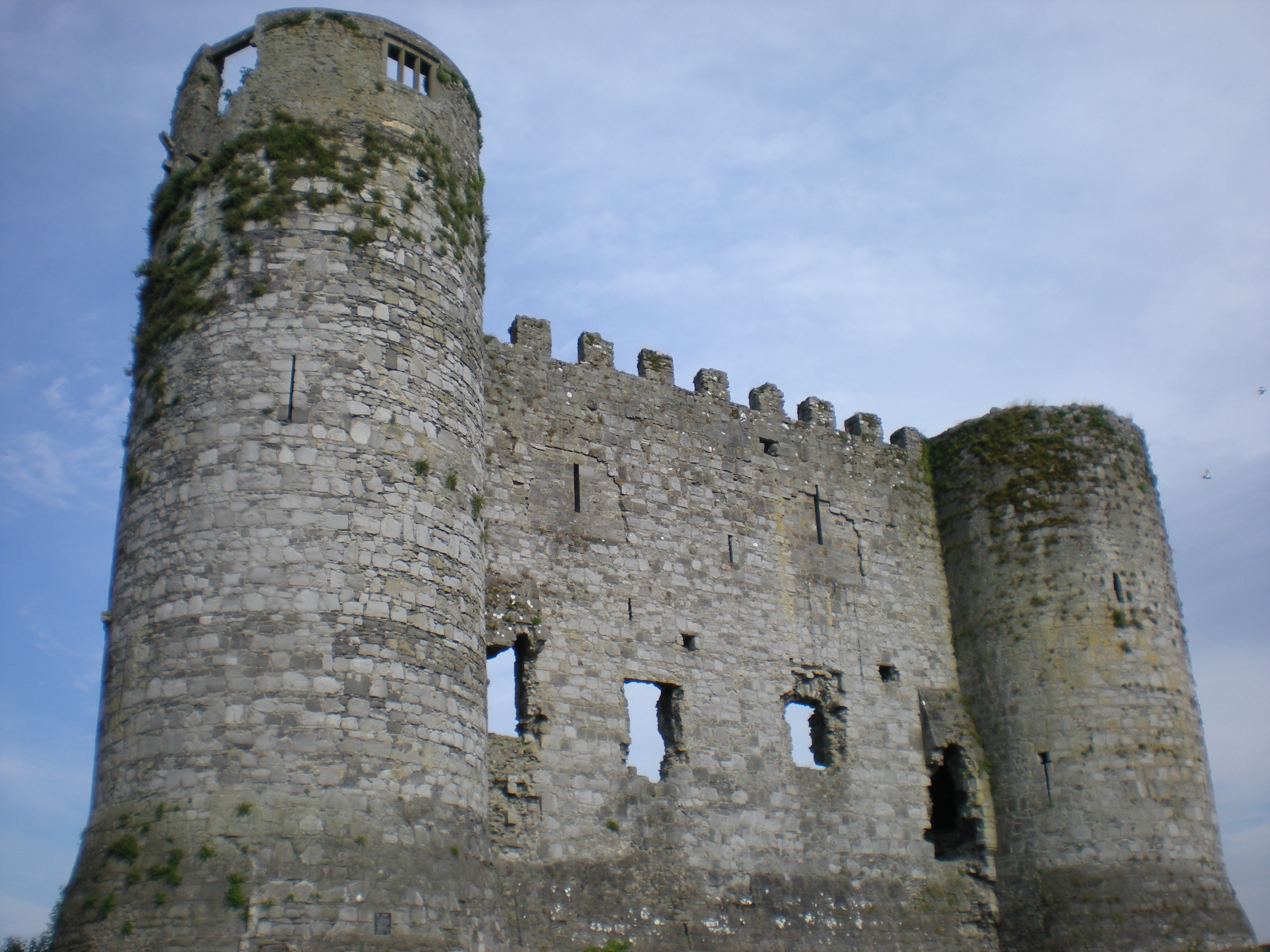
Carlow Castle

Waterford was not tightly besieged again until July 1650, but in the intervening months, it was steadily isolated. In January, its access to the west was cut off and in June, the Parliamentary commander Ireton arrived before the city. By this time Waterford was held by Irish general Preston. Not only was Preston's garrison short on food, but an epidemic (it is thought of bubonic plague) had taken hold in the city and was killing up to 400 people within the city walls a week. Moreover, the fall of Carlow (about 70 km north of Waterford) in July meant that Waterford could no longer be supplied via the river Barrow.

Ireton ordered his men to dig trenches for his siege guns, in order to bring them close enough to batter a breach in the walls and he also blockaded the port of Waterford with a Parliamentarian naval fleet. By the end of July, his artillery was in range of the walls. At this point, the Mayor and Aldermen of Waterford pleaded with Preston to surrender the city. He was down to 700 fit troops and only 500 pounds of gunpowder and was therefore in no position to resist an assault. Indeed, he himself was gravely ill. If the city fell to by storm, it was understood that the lives and property of its defenders would not be guaranteed. No doubt as a result of these considerations, Preston duly surrendered Waterford to Ireton on 6 August 1650. His troops were allowed to march away to Galway or Athlone, which were still in Irish Catholic hands, but he surrendered all the artillery, ammunition and ships in Waterford. Nearby Duncannon surrendered on 12 August.

How many of Waterford's garrison and population died during the sieges is difficult to determine. Ireton granted the civilian population lenient terms of surrender, respecting their lives and property. By contrast, at Limerick the following year, he had that city's most energetic defenders hung.

Waterford was the last Irish Catholic stronghold to hold out in the east of Ireland against the English Parliamentarian forces. After its fall, the Irish Catholic forces held only an enclave in the province of Connacht, west of the River Shannon.

== See also ==
- Siege of Waterford (1495), earlier unrelated 15th century siege

== Sources ==
- Gentles, Ian The New Model Army
- Plant, David (2008). "The Fall of Waterford, July-August 1650". BCW Project. David Plant.
- Plant, David (2008). "The Waterford Campaign, 1649". BCW Project. David Plant.
- Wheeler, James Scott, Cromwell in Ireland
