= Battle of New Ross =

The Battle of New Ross may refer to:

- The Battle of New Ross (1643), a battle of the Irish Confederate Wars, fought on March 18, 1643
- The Battle of New Ross (1798), a battle of the Irish Rebellion of 1798, fought on June 5, 1798
