= Geneva Barracks =

Barracks in County Waterford, Ireland

- Beairic na Ginéive
- Passage East
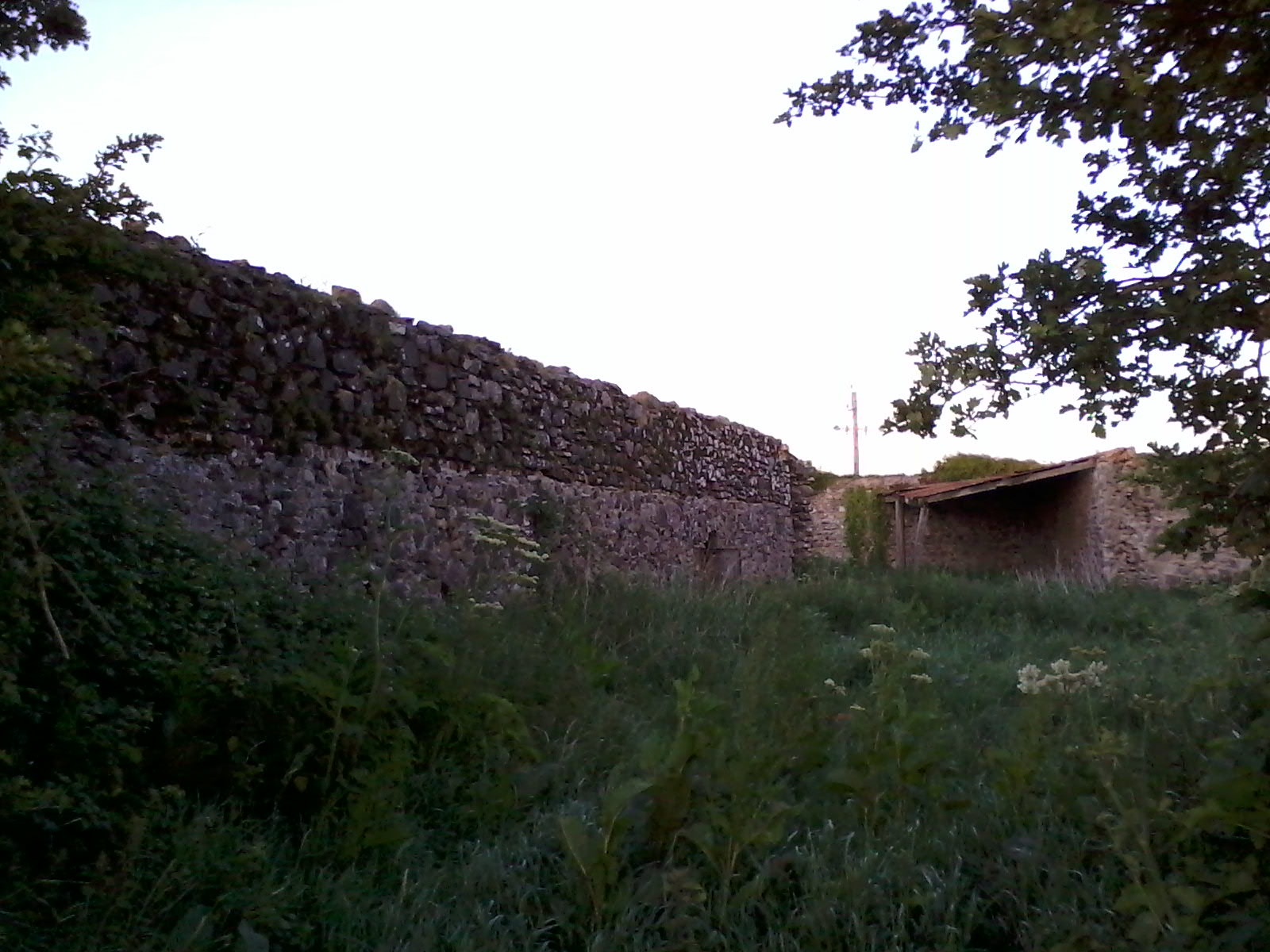
- Much of the remaining stone work can be seen

Site information
- Type: Barracks

Location
- Location within Ireland
- Coordinates: 52.21667°N 6.98333°W

Site history
- Built: 1783
- Built for: War Office
- In use: 1783-1824

Geneva Barracks (Irish: Beairic na Ginéive) in County Waterford, Ireland, was a barracks created in 1783 by converting a settlement which had been created for an 18th-century colony (New Geneva) of disaffected citizens of Geneva following the Geneva Revolution of 1782. Built near Passage East, the colony was commissioned by the Irish Parliament and approved by the Crown. After the Genevans abandoned their plans to settle in Waterford, the colony became a military barracks instead. During the Irish Rebellion of 1798, the barracks was transformed into a holding centre for captured United Irishmen rebels, many of whom were executed, transported or conscripted. Today, the only remains of New Geneva are its ruined walls in a grassy field.

== Origins ==
In 1782, the governing Protestant Ascendancy in Ireland were granted increased self-rule under the British Crown by the British Parliament. This greatly increased the powers of the Irish Parliament at College Green. The subsequent scrapping of the previous trade restrictions imposed by London, which had largely provoked the call for a more powerful and independent parliament in Dublin, led to a wave of grandiose plans for the economic and cultural development of the Kingdom of Ireland. One such plan was for the formation of a 'colony' of artisans and intellectuals to stimulate trade. In 1782, a failed rebellion against the ruling French and Swiss alliance led to a wave of Genevan refugees in Europe. As artisans, they were valued for their knowledge and skills and were invited to settle in their thousands in Ireland. A site in County Waterford was quickly acquired for the anticipated arrivals and named New Geneva, reflecting the origin of the first settlers.

James Gandon, the celebrated architect, was commissioned to prepare a plan for the town which would have been almost rectangular in shape with a vast shallow crescent 2,700 ft long overlooking Waterford Estuary. A rectangular site for a church was to be positioned at each end of the crescent which was to be backed by streets and terraces of houses. A central square was to have been overlooked by a central church with an apse and was surrounded by terraces of houses which were said to have been 'under construction'. There were to be two other open squares, one to the south overlooked by the academy with the market in the south west corner of the 'city'. Another courtyard to the north was to be overlooked by the Town Hall. A prison or hospital was to be located at the north west corner of the city. The city has many similarities with the French city of Richelieu. The barracks wall which exists today bears little resemblance to this ambitious plan. The original James Gandon drawing of the proposed city still exists.

== Military barracks ==
Although a vast sum of money (£50,000) was allocated to the project, the colony quickly collapsed when the Genevans insisted that they should be represented in the Irish Parliament and govern themselves under their own Genevan-style laws. The project was abandoned when this proposal could not be agreed upon and the site was eventually taken over by the government who began to transform the settlement into a military base. Barracks were built to house companies of Irish militia newly raised following the outbreak of war between France and Great Britain in 1793. The militia's purpose was to complement the regular forces stationed across the estuary in County Wexford at Duncannon Fort and to protect nearby Passage East in the event of French invasion.

== 1798 rebellion: prison ==
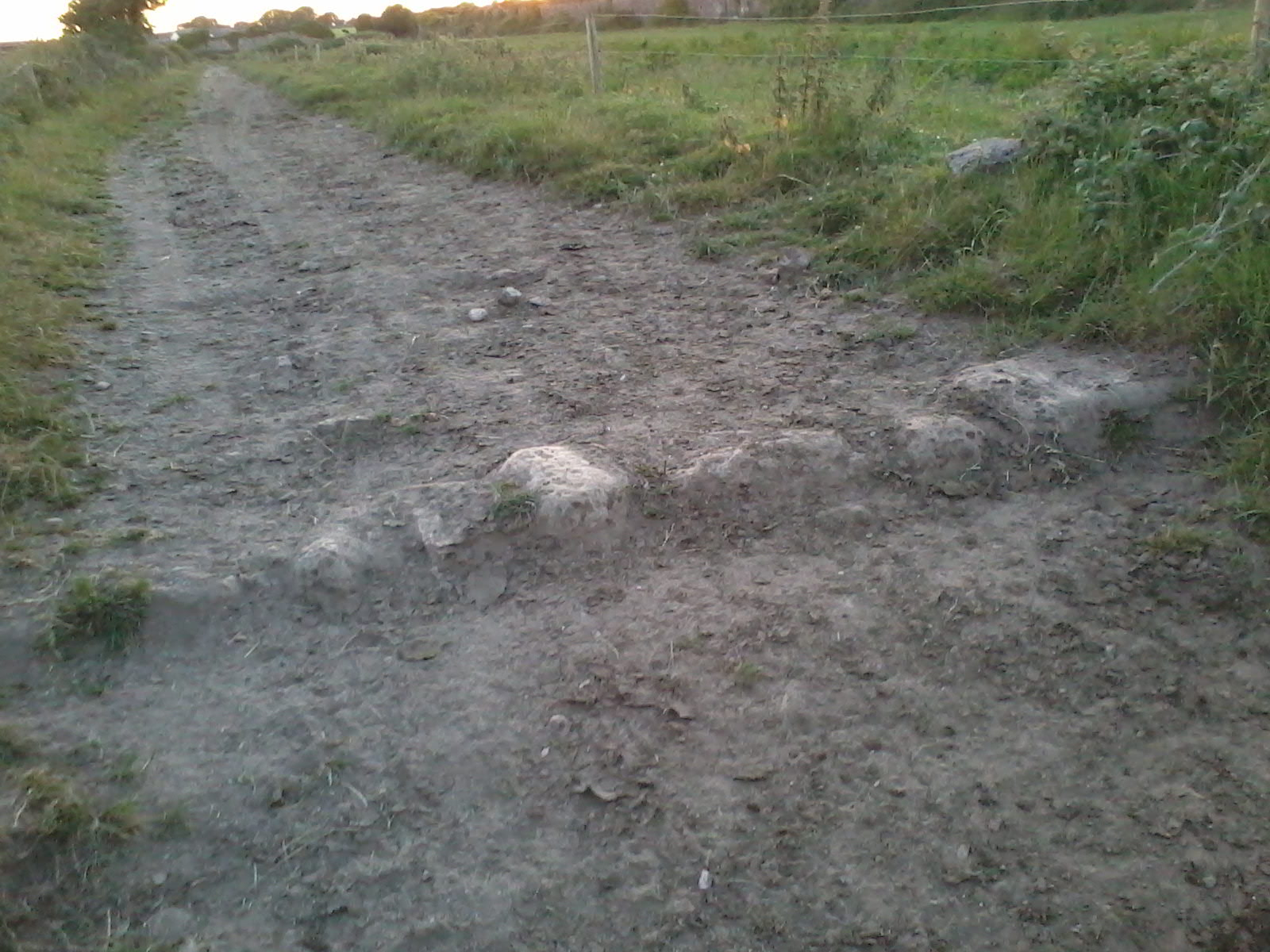
Most of the structure is crumbled beneath the ground

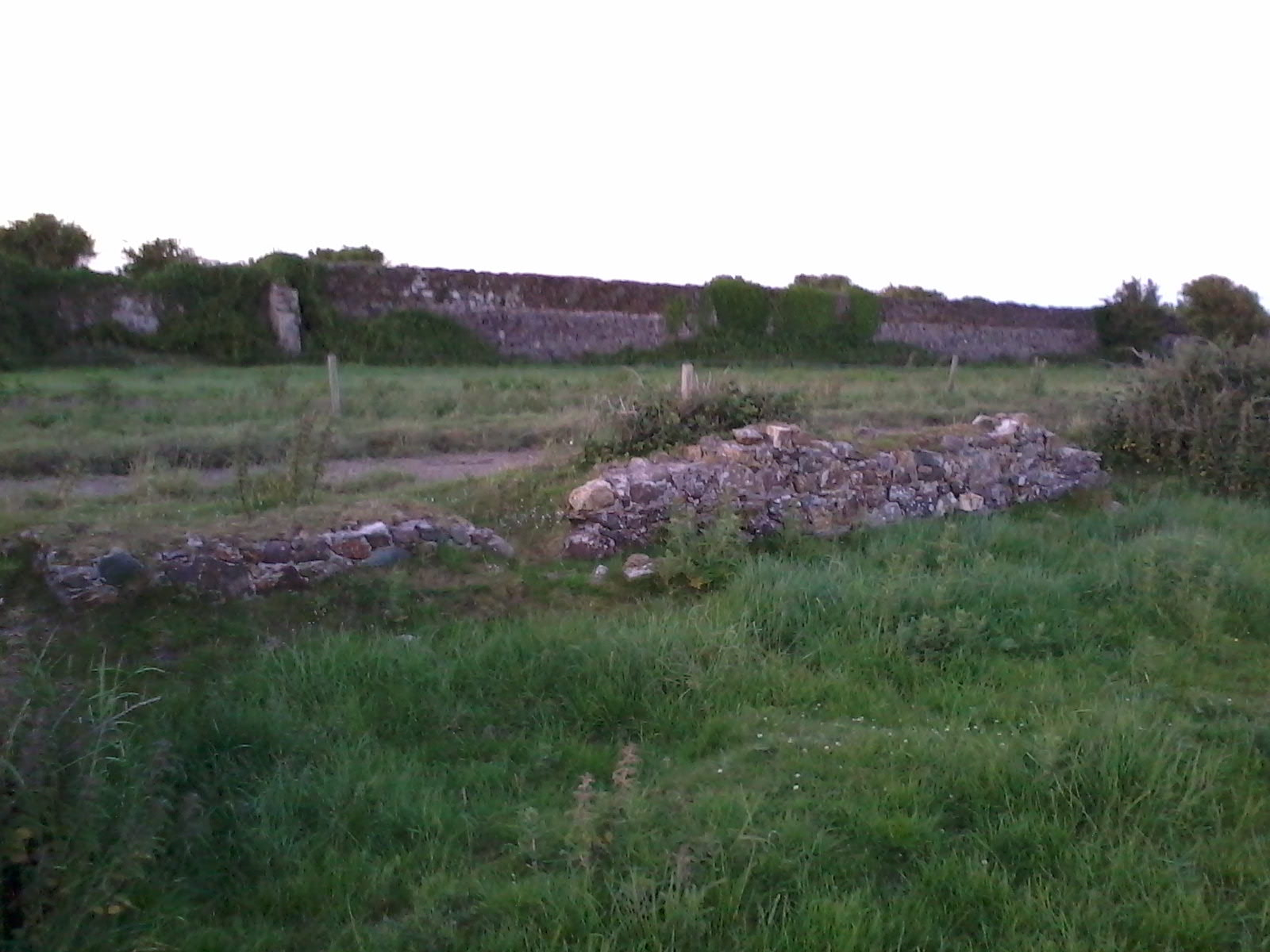
Enough of perimeter walls remain to give the impression of the size of the structure

The outbreak of the United Irish rebellion in May 1798 achieved its greatest success in County Wexford and for a time County Waterford was threatened. However, the rebel defeat at New Ross on 5 June prevented the break-out of Wexford rebels and discouraged Waterford rebels from taking to the field. The barracks then became a temporary holding centre for rebels and never held less than 1,000 prisoners by the summer of 1798. The prison at Geneva Barracks quickly became notorious for its atrocious conditions and ill treatment of prisoners. P.M. Egan describes Geneva and the story related by Mary Muldoon in his 1895 book Guide to Waterford:

Upon closer examination finding, as it is alleged, the remains of the blood of the numerous heads which were stuck on these walls, spoken of as still to be observed, the interest attached to the place becomes rather intense. Going among the peasantry of the neighbourhood, we were not long in having our ears regaled with the almost breathless and weird tale of Mary Muldoon. 'Well, 'avourneen, a fine young man who drove into the barracks in '98, and made join the sogers. The poor fellow didn't like the iday of goin' agin his own kith and kin, and maybe some day rise a gun to shoot of 'em. So he asked the officer, was there nothing to keep him but the high wall built all round. The officer, jokin' I suppose, said if he got over that wall he'd give him his liberty. So would that, he made one spring, and up on the wall wud him. Well wasn't that officer a bad fellow, he up wud his gun and shot the poor boy on the wall, and many a day after his poor mother, a widow, came to see where his blood was spilt on the same wall, where it remains to the present day'.

Most prisoners held who were not sentenced to death and executed were transported to Australia or impressed into the Royal Navy. However, emissaries of the King of Prussia were allowed to select the fittest men from among the prisoners to serve in the Prussian Army in part as payment for services rendered by his Hessians auxiliaries in suppressing the rebellion. Thomas Cloney, one of the rebel leaders at the battles of Three Rocks, New Ross and Foulksmills, was confined at Geneva Barracks while under sentence of death which was later commuted to exile by General Lord Cornwallis. He later claimed that the scars of the manacles put on him during his time in New Geneva were visible decades later.

The barracks gradually fell into disuse in the years following the end of the Napoleonic Wars and were finally closed in 1824. Today only the outer walls and some partially buried remains give note to the impressive size of the Genevan buildings.
