= Duncannon Fort =

Fort in County Wexford, Ireland

- Dún Canann
- Duncannon in Ireland
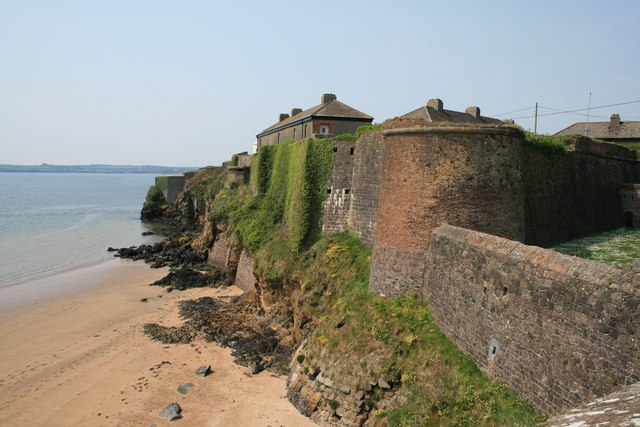

Site information
- Owner: Wexford County Council
- Open to the public: yes

Location
- Coordinates: 52.2208°N 6.9367°W

Site history
- Built: 1587
- Built by: Kingdom of Ireland
- In use: 1993
- Materials: Old Red Sandstone
- Battles/wars: Siege of Duncannon (1645)

Garrison information
- Past commanders: see Governor of Duncannon Fort

National monument of Ireland
- Official name: Duncannon
- Reference no.: 668

Duncannon Fort is a star fort and National Monument located in County Wexford, Ireland.

== Location ==
Duncannon Fort is located in a strategic position on a peninsula in the eastern part of Waterford Harbour, giving access to Ireland's Three Sisters: the River Barrow, River Nore and River Suir.

== History ==
A fort was built on this site by Normans in the 12th century, and there may have been an earlier earthen fort built by Gaelic Irish. The present star fort was built in 1587–88 by Queen Elizabeth I to defend Waterford from possible invasion by the Spanish Armada.

Duncannon Fort saw major military action during the Irish Confederate Wars. Commanded by the Royalist governor Laurence Esmonde, 1st Baron Esmonde, it was besieged and captured by Irish Catholic Confederation forces under Thomas Preston, 1st Viscount Tara in January–March 1645, the first time that mortars were used in Ireland. Oliver Cromwell failed to retake Duncannon in 1649, but it surrendered in 1650 after a blockade led by Henry Ireton.

In 1690, the fort hosted two kings. After the Battle of the Boyne and seeing little prospect of continuing his campaign, King James II fled to Duncannon and on 3 July sailed from there to Kinsale before departing for exile in France. Later that year, King William III stayed at the fort in September 1690 when bad weather delayed his return to England. The site where James' boat departed bears the name "King James' Hole."

A lighthouse was constructed in 1774 and remains in use.

The fort at Duncannon (commanded by William Fawcett) was one of the few places in County Wexford that did not fall under United Irishmen (Rebel) control during the 1798 Rebellion; the fort and town thus became a sanctuary for fleeing loyalists and troops in south Wexford and was also used as a prison and place of execution for rebels, from which it gained infamy as the Croppy Boy's site of execution in the song "The Croppy Boy." A force sent out from the fort to defend Wexford town was defeated at the Battle of Three Rocks.

Duncannon continued to be used as a fort by the British Army, being handed over to the Irish National Army only to burn down in 1922 during the Irish Civil War. It was occasionally used by the FCÁ (Army Reserve) for summer camps before being given to Wexford County Council in 1993 and later opening as a museum.

== Fort ==
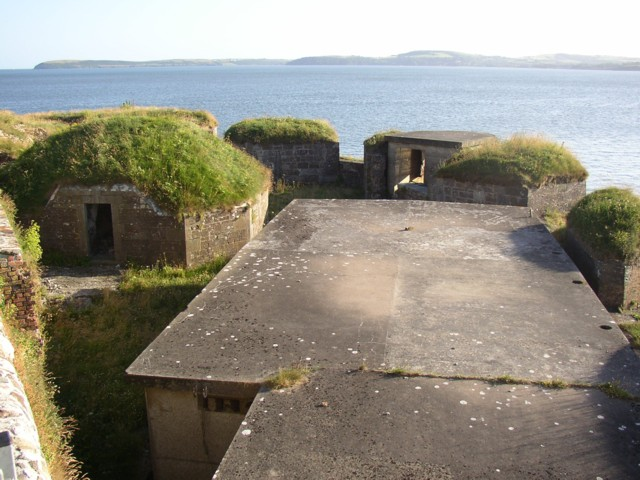
Lower battery

Duncannon Fort is a star fort. Along the sides were guns facing upriver and downriver. On the west end were artillery batteries facing across the entire inlet.

The landward defences had an angled redan projecting from the centre of the front, a deep ditch and a medieval wall. Primitive caponiers protect the ditch, and each counterscarp gallery had a sally port so that the garrison could enter the ditch without being seen.

A nearby hill, Windmill Hill, would offer a perfect site to bombard the fort. Recognising this, the English raised the east wall in 1606 to guard against this.
