= Duncannon =

Duncannon Dún Canann
- Village
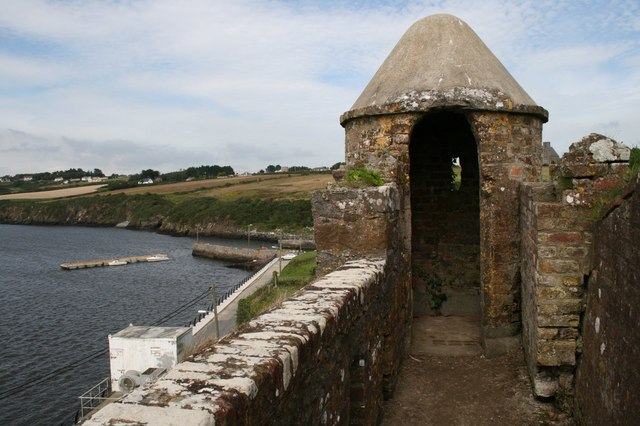
- Watchtower at Duncannon Fort

- Location in Ireland
- Coordinates: 52°13′16″N 6°55′55″W
- Country: Ireland
- Province: Leinster
- County: County Wexford
- Elevation: 48 m (157 ft)

Population (2016)
  - Total: 305
- Time zone: UTC+0 (WET)
  - Summer (DST): UTC-1 (IST (WEST))
- Irish Grid Reference: S728082

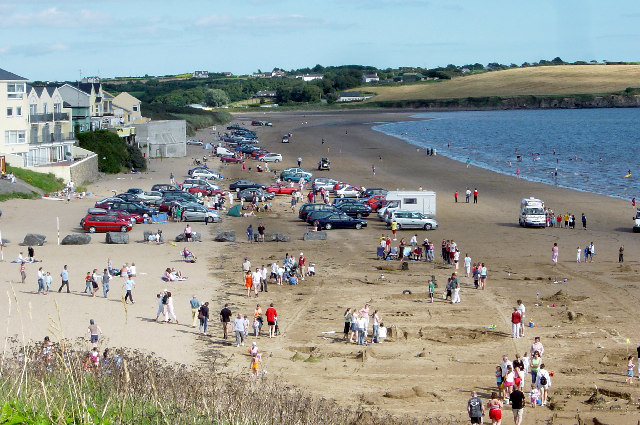
A sandcastle building contest taking place on the sandy Duncannon beach.

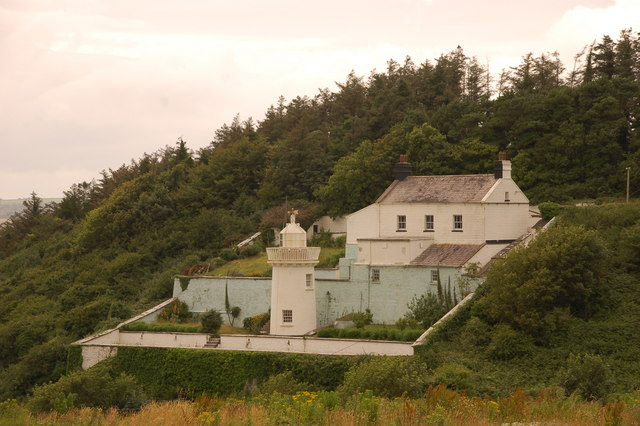
Lighthouse located north of Duncannon near Arthurstown

Duncannon (Irish: Dún Canann) is a village in southwest County Wexford, Ireland. Bordered to the west by Waterford harbour and sitting on a rocky headland jutting into the channel is the strategically prominent Duncannon Fort which dominates the village.

Primarily a fishing village, Duncannon also relies on tourism and is situated on the marked "Ring of Hook" drive. Duncannon beach, a mile-long beach, was once a blue flag recipient.

Duncannon Fort, which was built in 1588, was used as a location for the opening scenes of the 2002 remake of 'The Count of Monte Cristo', starring Jim Caviezel and Richard Harris. After being closed for some time, Duncannon Fort reopened to the public in 2016 when guided tours recommenced.

== History ==
According to legend, the settlement at Duncannon dates back to the time of Fionn mac Cumhaill (Finn McCool) and the Fianna in the 3rd century AD.

Duncannon was of strategic importance as its fort commanded the bay giving sea access to Waterford harbour. As a result, it was centrally involved in wars and sieges during the 17th and 18th centuries.

During the Irish Confederate Wars (1641–1652), the fort at Duncannon was initially occupied by English soldiers and used as a base for an attack on nearby Redmond's Hall (now Loftus Hall). During this period, it was besieged three times. In 1645, it was taken by an Irish Confederate army under general Thomas Preston. Its English garrison surrendered after lengthy bombardment, during which their second in command Larcan was killed, and a ship, The Great Lewis, trying to bring supplies to the garrison was sunk with the loss of 200 lives (see Siege of Duncannon). During the Cromwellian conquest of Ireland, Duncannon was besieged again, as part of the Siege of Waterford, firstly in November 1649 by Oliver Cromwell and Michael Jones in 1649. The fort's Irish garrison held out, and the siege was abandoned in December of that year. However, in July 1650, Henry Ireton renewed the siege, and the fort and town surrendered after the fall of Waterford.

In 1659 and 1660, Duncannon was the only town to remain openly loyal to Edmund Ludlow after forces loyal to General George Monck took control of Dublin and other towns.

In the Williamite war in Ireland (1689–1691) James II, after his defeat at the battle of the Boyne, embarked at Duncannon for Kinsale and then to exile in France. Later his son in law and enemy William of Orange, marched on its cobblestones as the town and fort surrendered to his army without resistance.

The fort at Duncannon was one of the few places in county Wexford that did not fall to the rebels during the 1798 rebellion though a force sent out from the fort to defend Wexford town was defeated at the battle of Three Rocks. The fort and town then became a sanctuary for fleeing loyalists and troops in south Wexford and was also used as a prison and place of execution for suspected rebels.

Duncannon's strategic importance continued to be recognised throughout the 19th century. Napoleon sought and got intelligence on its strength and weakness, in preparation for a possible invasion of Ireland.

In the 20th century, Duncannon fort was used by the Fórsa Cosanta Áitiúil (Irish army reserve) as a barracks and training facility.

== Duncannon lifeboat ==
The Royal National Lifeboat Institution (RNLI) established a lifeboat station at Duncannon in 1869, to serve the area around Waterford Harbour.

The lifeboat was a 33-foot Peake-class 'Pulling and Sailing' (P&S) lifeboat, equipped with 10 oars, and sails for use when conditions were right. The lifeboat and carriage was funded from the bequest of £250 of the late Mrs Anne and Miss Elizabeth Sophia Warner, and named in memory of (Rev.) Richard and Anne Warner.

Duncannon lifeboat station was closed in 1886, following the placement of a lifeboat at Dunmore East in 1884, and replaced by a new station at Fethard.

== Transport ==
Bus Éireann route 370 links Duncannon to New Ross, Waterford and Wellingtonbridge. There are several buses daily except Sundays. The nearest railway station is Waterford railway station which is located 22 km away in Waterford travelling via the Ballyhack - Passage East ferry.

== Sports ==
The local Gaelic Athletic Association club team is called St James' G.A.A club, and plays in the Wexford Senior Football Championship and the Wexford Intermediate Hurling Championship. The club won the Wexford Senior Football Championship in 2015, having been promoted from the Intermediate rank the previous year. The hurling team have won several county titles having begun at Junior D level in 2009. In later years, Matthew O'Hanlon captained the Wexford Senior Hurling team to win the Leinster SHC final in 2019 and village native Graeme Molloy also captained the Wexford senior football side prior to his retirement. Brendan Doyle was also a member of the panel during the 2000s and early 2010s.

The local soccer team is Duncannon United who play in the Wexford League.

== Amenities ==
Duncannon has three pubs, two cafes and a local shop. Local restaurants include Aldridge Lodge and Dunbrody Country House. There are also several cafes in the area and on the beach front. Duncannon Holiday Park is a holiday village which provides accommodation and camping facilities.

Duncannon Fort incorporates a maritime museum, Cockleshell Arts Gallery, Officer's Mess Café and craft shop and other craft outlets and is open daily from June to September. During the off season, guided tours are available from Monday to Friday. Duncannon Fort.

== Events ==
A number of festivals are held in Duncannon every year. In August there are two festivals. Firstly, a sand festival is held on the beach which a sand sculpting exhibition in a large tent. The sand festival also includes a crab fishing competition and a fireworks display. A kitesurfing festival is also held every August, with the date dependent on the tides.

== See also ==
- List of towns and villages in Ireland
