= Viscount Tara =

Viscount Tara (or Taragh) was a title in the Peerage of Ireland.

The title was created by King Charles II in 1650 for the soldier Thomas Preston (1585–1655). He was the second son of Christopher Preston, 4th Viscount Gormanston. The 1st Viscount's son Anthony succeeded him as 2nd Viscount Tara. The title became extinct in 1674 on the death of Thomas, 3rd Viscount, at the hands of Sir Francis Blundell and his two brothers, who were subsequently acquitted of his murder.

== Viscounts Tara (1650) ==
- Thomas Preston, 1st Viscount Tara (1585–1655)
- Anthony Preston, 2nd Viscount Tara (1618–1659)
- Thomas Preston, 3rd Viscount Tara (1652–1674)

== See also ==
- Viscount Gormanston
- Baron Tara
