= Blackrock Lifeboat Station =

Former lifeboat station in County Louth, Ireland

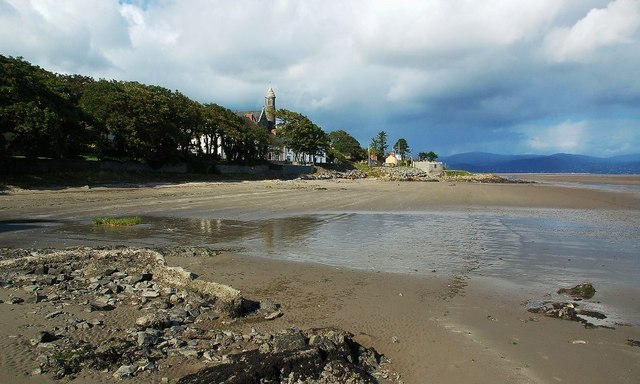
- Blackrock Shore

- Location within Ireland
- Alternative names: Dundalk; Blackrock (Dundalk)

General information
- Status: Closed
- Type: RNLI Lifeboat Station
- Location: The Boat House, Cocklehill Rd, Haggardstown, Blackrock, County Louth, Ireland
- Coordinates: 53°57′26.2″N 6°22′03.0″W
- Opened: 1859–1879; 1880–1935

Blackrock Lifeboat Station was located just off Coast Road, on the southern headland at Blackrock, a village overlooking Dundalk Bay to the south Dundalk, in County Louth, on the east coast of Ireland.

The lifeboat station was originally known as Dundalk Lifeboat Station, and was established by the Royal National Lifeboat Institution (RNLI) in 1859, following the Mary Stoddard disaster. It is one of two stations that have been home to the 'Dundalk lifeboat', the other being at Giles Quay.

After operating for 75-years, with a brief gap between 1879 and 1880, Blackrock Lifeboat Station was closed in 1935.

== History ==
A storm, which is described in the Shipwreck Inventory of Ireland as 'one of the worst storms to have hit the coastlines of County Louth', began on Tuesday 6 April 1858, and did not subside until the following Sunday. The barque Mary Stoddart was seen in distress in Dundalk Bay on the 6 April 1858. Numerous attempts were made over five days to rescue the crew, and four men lost their lives in the rescue efforts. The Captain and nine crewmen were finally rescued by H.M. Coastguard Chief Boatman Robert Shankey and his boat crew from Giles Quay on the 9 and 10 April, but seven crewmen of the Mary Stoddart had been lost.

No fewer than 10 RNLI Silver Medals were awarded for the rescue efforts, and a memorial was erected in Roden Place, Dundalk, in memory of those men who gave their lives.

In Memory
of
Captain James Kelly
Gerald Hughes
James Crosbey
and
James Murphy
who lost their lives
in a Noble and Humble Effort
to rescue the crew of the Barque
Mary Stoddart
wrecked in Dundalk Bay
on 9 April 1858

As a result of this disaster, the RNLI promised to place a lifeboat in the Dundalk area, on finding a suitable location. Lord Clermont had a lifeboat house built at his own expense at Blackrock, and a 30-foot self-righting 'Pulling and Sailing' (P&S) lifeboat, one with sails and (6) oars, was placed there by the RNLI in 1859.

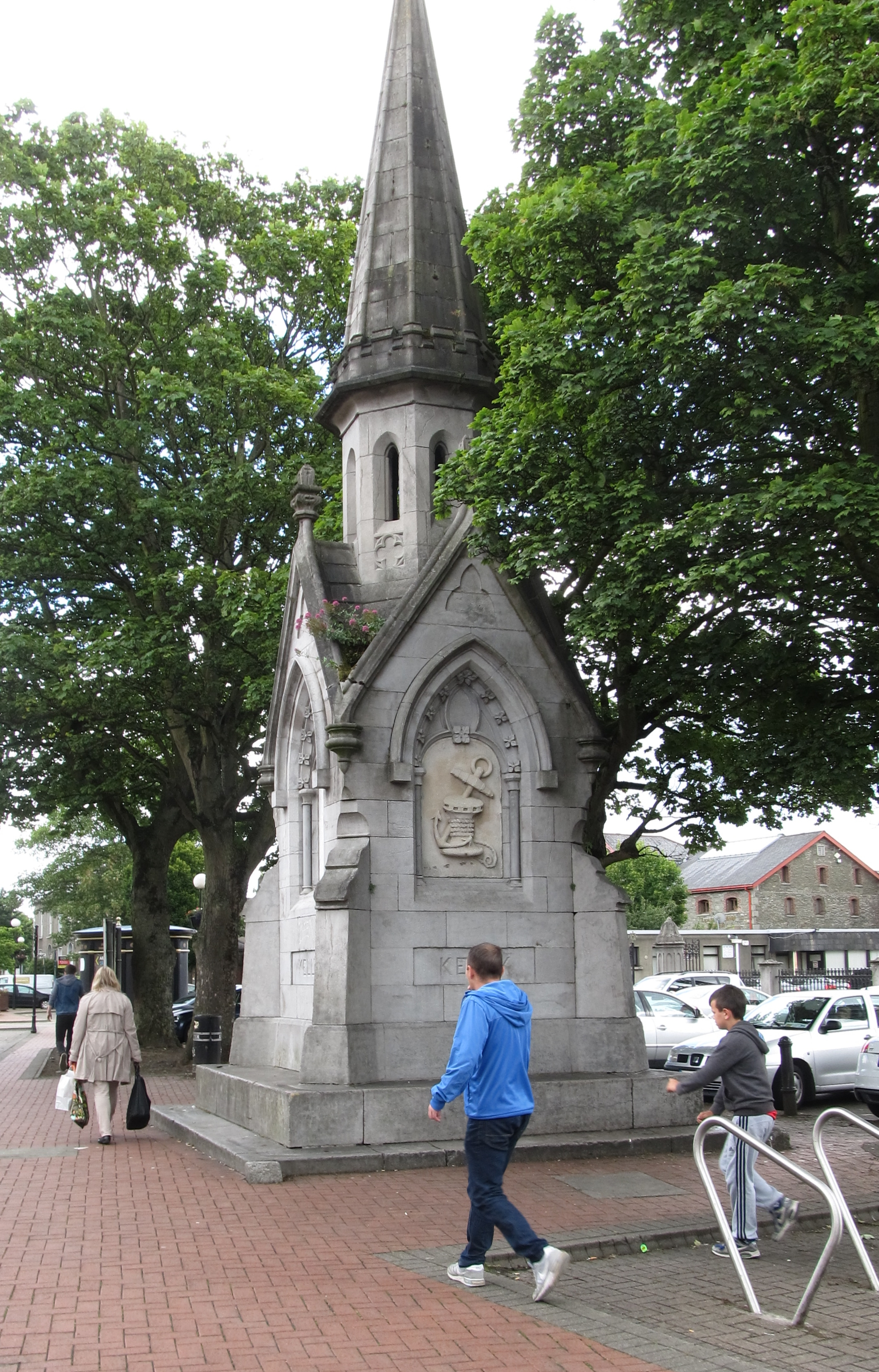
Memorial, Roden Place Dundalk

A first service for the Blackrock lifeboat came on 19 September 1859, giving assistance to the vessel John James of the Isle of Man. A call on 22 August 1861 to the barque Frederick, on passage from Dublin to the West Indies, but wrecked at Dundalk harbour entrance, resulted in 21 lives being saved.

Funded by children attending Sunday School, a new lifeboat Stockport Sunday Schools was placed at Blackrock in the summer of 1867. This boat was launched on the 2 July 1873, to the Glasgow barque Prince of Wales (recorded locally as the Princess of Wales), aground 1 mile (1.6 km) south of the lighthouse, and rescued 16 people. The wreck was a hazard to shipping for 20 years, and was eventually blown up.

At certain times of the day, the tide was preventing any launch of the lifeboat from Blackrock. Following a visit by the second Assistant Inspector of Lifeboats in 1876, a site at Giles Quay (now Gyles' Quay), on the north side of Dundalk Bay, was considered for the relocation of the lifeboat, "in which position the boat would be two miles from the bar, but to windward of it, and able to launch at any time of tide."

RNLB Stockport Sunday Schools was transferred over to the new station in 1879, and Blackrock lifeboat station was closed.

Almost straight away, the decision was reversed, and in 1880, it was decided to reopen the Blackrock station, but also to retain the new Giles Quay station, where a new boat, James Thomas, was placed on station. Before the lifeboat Stockport Sunday Schools was transferred back to Blackrock, a race was held between the two station boats, Blackrock emerging victors, after a restart.

A new 34-foot-6-inch (10.52 m) self-righting (P&S) lifeboat was placed at the station in 1885, funded from the bequest of the late Mrs Helen Blake of Handcross House, Sussex. The funds were received through Her Majesty’s Treasury, with the lifeboat named General R. Dudley Blake (ON 95) in memory of her late husband.

In 1891, the Dundalk No.2 Station was renamed Blackrock Lifeboat Station.

As is the way, the lifeboat was not required for 10 years, but then required for two rescues on the same day, 24 December 1895. The first, to the steamship Paragon, beached at Dunaney Point, required 3 hours of hard rowing to make the 2 miles (3.2 km) to the beached vessel, rescuing 11. The second, to the barque Ardendee of Liverpool, where another 11 people were rescued. It would then be another nine years before the lifeboat was once again needed. On that same day of 24 December 1895, all 15 crew of the Kingstown No.2 Lifeboat were lost in the Kingstown Lifeboat Disaster, whilst answering a call to the Russian barque Palme, on passage from Liverpool to South America.

A new boathouse was constructed at Blackrock in 1900, at a cost of £400.

In 1909, the lifeboat was replaced with a 35-foot lifeboat, again funded from the Helen Blake legacy, and again given the same name, General R. Dudley Blake (ON 593). On a call just before Christmas 1909, both lifeboats from Blackrock and Giles Quay stood by, until a tug came to tow the steam dredger Thames to harbour.

With more powered vessels at sea, there were fewer and fewer calls on the lifeboat, and Blackrock would not be required again until 1923. In the last call out on 8 April 1923, the lifeboat brought ashore two passengers from the Fetlar, aground on the sand, but in no immediate danger.

Blackrock lifeboat was called just five times between 1909 and 1935. With a motor-powered lifeboat placed at Clogherhead in 1931, at a meeting of the RNLI committee of management on Thursday 11 July 1935, it was decided to close Blackrock Lifeboat Station. Launched 39 times since opening, the Blackrock lifeboat had rescued 75 people.

The 1900 lifeboat station building still stands, somewhat neglected, but is reported as being used as an art studio. The lifeboat on station at the time of closure, General R. Dudley Blake (ON 593), was sold from service. As of December 2023, the boat was in storage and awaiting restoration, at Ardee, County Louth.

== Helen Blake ==
Helen Blake (née Sheridan) of Handcross House, Sussex, was the wife of Peninsular War veteran General Robert Dudley Blake, and inherited his estate on his death in 1850. She then inherited the entire estate of his brother, Sir Francis Blake. When Helen died aged 76 in 1876, she died intestate, and with no children or heirs - their one child had died in infancy - the entire fortune, worth around £120,000, was seized by The Crown.

Helen had actually made a will, with specific legacies of £19,400, but the will had never been signed. Despite this, HM Treasury, who are responsible for the distribution of all assets left by a intestate person, decided to honour most of the specific bequests. This included £6,400 to the RNLI, to purchase two lifeboats, to be placed at stations in Ireland. Two trust funds were set up, the Blake Lifeboat Maintenance Fund and the Blake Lifeboat Reward Fund. In all, the funds provided or maintained six lifeboats.

- General R. Dudley Blake (ON 95), Blackrock, (1885–1909)
- Helen Blake (ON 100), Fethard, (1886–1897)
- Helen Blake (ON 301), Fethard, (1897–1905)
- Helen Blake (ON 546), Fethard, (1905–1914)
- General R. Dudley Blake (ON 593), Blackrock, (1909–1935)
- Helen Blake (ON 809), Poolbeg, (1938–1959)

== Station honours ==
The following are awards made at Blackrock.

- RNLI Silver Medal

Bernard Johnston, Captain of Steamer Enterprise – 1858
John Connick, Agent for The Shipwrecked Fishermen and Mariners' Royal Benevolent Society – 1858
Thomas Lewis, Mate, Earle of Erne – 1858
William Gilmer, First Mate, steamship Pride of Erin – 1858
Nicholas Crosby – 1858
George Elphinstone – 1858
John Hynds – 1858
Thomas McArdle – 1858

== Blackrock lifeboats ==
=== Pulling and Sailing (P&S) lifeboats ===
ON (Note: ON is the RNLI's Official Number of the boat.)	Name	Built	On station	Class	Comments
Pre-345	Unnamed	1859	1859−1867	30-foot Peake Self-righting (P&S)	(Note: 30-foot x 6-foot 3in (6-oared) Peake-class self-righting (P&S) lifeboat, built by Forrestt of Limehouse, London, costing £140)
Pre-499	Stockport Sunday Schools	1867	1867−1879	32-foot Prowse Self-righting (P&S)	(Note: 32-foot x 7-foot 6in (10-oared) Prowse-class self-righting (P&S) lifeboat, gift of Stockport Sunday Schools LB fund, built by Forrestt of Limehouse, London, costing £246.)
Station Closed 1879–1880
Pre-499	Stockport Sunday Schools	1867	1880−1885	32-foot Prowse Self-righting (P&S)	
95	General R. Dudley Blake	1884	1885−1909	34-foot 2in Self-righting (P&S)	(Note: 34-foot 6in x 7-foot 8in (10-oared) self-righting (P&S) lifeboat, legacy of Mrs H. Blake of Handcross House, Sussex, built by Forrestt of Limehouse, London, costing £330.)
593	General R. Dudley Blake	1909	1909−1935	35-foot Self-righting (P&S)	(Note: 35-foot x 8-foot 3in (10-oared) self-righting (P&S) lifeboat, legacy of Mrs H. Blake of Handcross House, Sussex, built by Thames Ironworks of Blackwall, London, costing £892.)

Pre ON numbers are unofficial numbers used by the Lifeboat Enthusiast Society to reference early lifeboats not included on the official RNLI list.

== See also ==
- List of RNLI stations
- List of former RNLI stations
- Royal National Lifeboat Institution lifeboats
