= Duncannon Lifeboat Station =

Former RNLI lifeboat station in County Wexford, Ireland

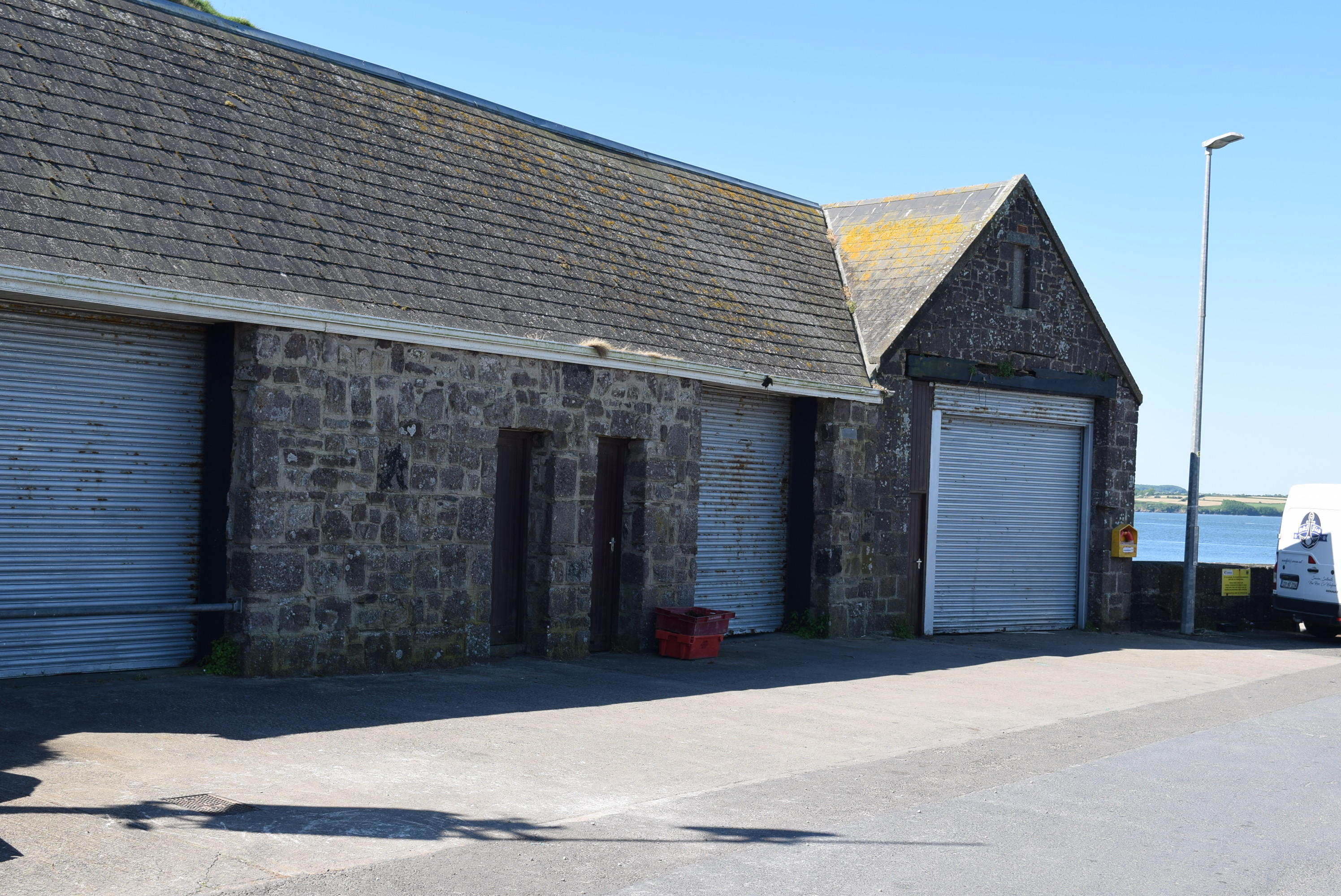
- Former RNLI boathouse, Duncannon, Co. Wexford

- Duncannon, County Wexford

General information
- Status: Closed
- Type: RNLI Lifeboat Station
- Location: Duncannon Harbour, Quay Road, Duncannon, County Wexford, Ireland
- Coordinates: 52°13′17.8″N 6°56′11.8″W
- Opened: 1869
- Closed: 1886

Duncannon Lifeboat Station was located on Quay Road, at the harbour in Duncannon, a village sitting on the River Suir estuary, on the western side of the Hook Peninsula in County Wexford, on the south coast of Ireland.

A lifeboat station was first established at Duncannon in 1869 by the Royal National Lifeboat Institution (RNLI).

Duncannon Lifeboat Station was closed in 1886.

== History ==
In 1869, the RNLI established a new lifeboat station at Duncannon, at the entrance to Waterford Harbour. The lifeboat was thought to be ideally located, as there was sufficient local fishermen to crew the boat, and steamers were usually readily available, should the lifeboat require a tow. It also had a good road network, and the lifeboat could be easily transported over the Hook peninsula to Fethard-on-Sea should the need arise. A boathouse was constructed on a site near the pier, granted by the War Office.

The Malcomson Bros. of London and Waterford, transported the lifeboat and carriage to Waterford free of charge, on board one of their steamers. The 33-foot self-righting 'Pulling and Sailing' (P&S) lifeboat, one with oars and sails, arrived in the city on 20 September 1886, and was paraded through the streets to the Quay. A naming ceremony took place, where the lifeboat was named Richard and Anne by Jane Loftus, Marchioness of Ely.

The lifeboat and carriage was funded from the bequest of £250 of the late Mrs Anne and Miss Elizabeth Sophia Warner, and named in memory of the late (Rev.) Richard and Anne Warner.

At 09:00 on the 19 January 1875, the Duncannon lifeboat Richard and Anne was called to the aid of the brig Vittorioso G of Italy, driven ashore on Selskar Rocks in Bannow Bay, whilst on passage from Cardiff to Constantinople. The lifeboat first had to be transported the 10 km (6.2 mi) to Fethard strand, and it was 12:00 noon before she was launched. In view of a large crowd, and after 2 hours hard rowing, all 9 crew of the Vittorioso G were landed ashore.

When the Duncannon lifeboat was launched at 13:15 on the 3 March 1881, the lifeboat was unable to make headway due to the strong wind and tide, and needed the assistance of the steam-tug Resolute from Waterford. The vessel was the brigantine Dayspring of Dublin, travelling to Waterford from Newcastle-upon-Tyne. They managed to rescue the Master, found clinging to some wreckage, but five crew had been lost when the Dayspring had broken up.

The Duncannon lifeboat would once again be transported the 10 km (6.2 mi) to Fethard on 13 February 1884, when a telegram was received telling of a large four-masted ship, which had been driven onto Pollock Roacks in Fethard Bay in strong gale force winds. The vessel was the 2000 ton Earl Beaconsfield of Glasgow, on passage to San Francisco. With great difficulty, the lifeboat was launched, heading to the vessel which was four miles away, but was driven back ashore. With fresh crew, the lifeboat was launched again an hour later, and 33 men were rescued from the vessel and landed at Fethard.

In 1884, that it was decided to establish a lifeboat station at Fethard, on the east side of the Hook peninsula, and to close the existing station at Duncannon. This was brought about when another new station was opened in 1884 at Dunmore East, located on the opposite side of the River Suir estuary from Duncannon, but far closer to the open sea.

Duncannon Lifeboat Station was closed in 1886, at the same time Fethard Lifeboat Station was opened. The Richard and Anne, the only lifeboat to have served at Duncannon, was withdrawn from service and subsequently broken up. The station building still stands on the quay at Duncannon.

== Duncannon lifeboat ==
ON (Note: ON is the RNLI's Official Number of the boat.)	Name	Built	On station	Class	Comments
Pre-527	Richard and Anne	1869	1869–1886	33-foot Peake Self-righting (P&S)	(Note: 33-foot x 8-foot 6in (10-oared) Peake-class self-righting (P&S) lifeboat, gift of Mr and Miss Warner of Lyncombe, Somerset, built by Forrestt of Limehouse, London, costing £276.)

Station Closed, 1886

Pre ON numbers are unofficial numbers used by the Lifeboat Enthusiast Society to reference early lifeboats not included on the official RNLI list.

== See also ==
- List of RNLI stations
- List of former RNLI stations
- Royal National Lifeboat Institution lifeboats
