= Edward Wogan =

Colonel Edward Wogan (c. 1626–1654) was an Irish Royalist officer. He is known as one of the last royalists to lose his life in the civil war.

== Background ==
Wogan had originally been a Covenanting soldier who served under Cromwell but later defected to the Royalist cause of King Charles II.

== Duncannon fort ==
Wogan is famed for successfully defending a fort at Duncannon during the Irish Confederate Wars, from a siege by Oliver Cromwell. Thomas Roche informed the Duke of Ormonde that there was no way that he could hold the fort against Cromwell and that he would have to surrender as there were no provisions coming into the fort. The Duke of Ormonde then sent Edward Wogan, himself a defector from Ireton's ranks under Cromwell, along with 120 cavalry to replace Roche. They arrived just in time to save the fort and sent a defiant answer to Cromwell and he abandoned the siege rather than pursue it through the Winter. This saved Waterford from occupation by Oliver Cromwell's army. See main article: Siege of Waterford.

== In Britain ==
Colonel Edward Wogan also took part in the Royalist rising of 1651 to 1654 in Scotland. In November 1653 Colonel Edward Wogan, an Irishman sailed from France into England where he recruited twenty-one men in London and rode off with them to join the Earl of Glencairn. He had decided to desert Parliamentary service and instead to move his body of mounted men along with some Worcestershire Royalists . They rode some 300 miles into Edinburgh. It is possible that, on the way, Wogan and his men carried out a coup against the English Parliamentarians at Carlisle Castle, releasing a number of Royalist prisoners.

Wogan and his small band set out for on 21 November, covering around 25 miles a day, reached Durham nine days later. His decision to rest in Durham was reversed at the news of a Royalist success of the highlanders. Realising that reinforcements would probably soon be arriving from England, he gave up his intention to recruit in Durham and Northumberland and set off on 4 December. A party of Cromwellian horse was despatched from Newcastle to apprehend them but was driven back. Wogan and his men also managed to capture small parties of Cromwellians on their way, taking eighteen men outside Berwick, and driving through the town in broad daylight. In the Lowlands, with the informal help of a number of Moss-troopers, they captured a number of Lilburne’s men and entered Peebles on 9 December 1653. Wogan was able to persuade a number of dissatisfied mosstroopers to join his band permanently.

== Injury and death ==
When Wogan advanced into the Earl of Glencairn’s headquarters at Loch Tay, he had according to Captain John Gwynne - around one hundred supporters. Glencairn welcomed the Irishman and granted him a commission to raise a regiment of horse. In a letter dated 6 February, Clarendon wrote to Middleton that Wogan had reported his troops were ‘above 1 500 horse and 8 000 foote’. He led his new regiment in a number of successful raids into Lowland territory thus winning the respect of Highlanders. Indeed, it was when Wogan’s career had reached another pinnacle that an injury ended further adventures. During a skirmish with English troops from the Brazen Wall Regiment near Drummond and Weems, he was wounded in the shoulder by a sword-thrust.

== Assessment ==
Wogan left a highly favourable impression on the Scottish Royalists alongside whom he fought side by side. John Graham of Deuchrie, who accompanied Glencairn throughout the rebellion, recorded Wogan's exceptional valour and courage:

The colonel himself was unfortunately killed in a encounter he had with the brazen-wall regiment of horse; but notwithstanding of the deadly wounds he had received, he rooted the troop, and killed their commander thereof, though it was said, that in all the civil wars they never had been beaten. This brave gentleman had his wounds healed over, but from what cause I know not, they broke out again, and caused his death, to the great regret of all who knew him.
