= Robert Sloper =

British Army general

General Sir Robert Sloper KB
- Born: 8 May 1729
- Died: 18 August 1802 (aged 73)
- Military career
- Allegiance: Kingdom of Great Britain
- Branch: British Army
- Rank: General
- Commands: Indian Army
- Conflicts: Second Anglo-Mysore War; Third Anglo-Mysore War
- Awards: Knight Companion of the Order of the Bath

General Sir Robert Sloper KB (8 May 1729 – 18 August 1802) was Commander-in-Chief, India.

== Military career ==
Educated privately at Bishops Cannings in Wiltshire, Sloper was commissioned into the 10th Dragoons being promoted to major in 1755. He was appointed commanding officer of 1st King's Dragoon Guards in 1759 and subsequently saw service in Flanders and Germany. He was appointed Governor of Hurst Castle in 1767.

In 1778 he was deployed to Ireland and from 1779 he was sent to India seeing service in the Second Anglo-Mysore War as well as the Third Anglo-Mysore War. In 1785 he became Acting Commander-in-Chief in Madras and from July 1785 he was appointed Commander-in-Chief, India. In May 1788 he was invested KB and appointed Governor of Duncannon Fort in 1795. He was promoted to full general in 1796.

He lived at West Woodhay House at West Woodhay in Berkshire and is buried at St. Martin's Church in East Woodhay in Hampshire.

== Family ==
He was married to Jane Willis with whom he had six sons and four daughters.

Military offices
Preceded by George Warde	Colonel of the 14th Regiment of (Light) Dragoons; 1778–1797	Succeeded by John Egerton
Preceded by Giles Stibbert	Commander-in-Chief, India; 1785–1786	Succeeded by Charles Cornwallis
