= Fethard Lifeboat Station =

RNLI lifeboat station in County Wexford, Ireland

- Flag of the RNLI

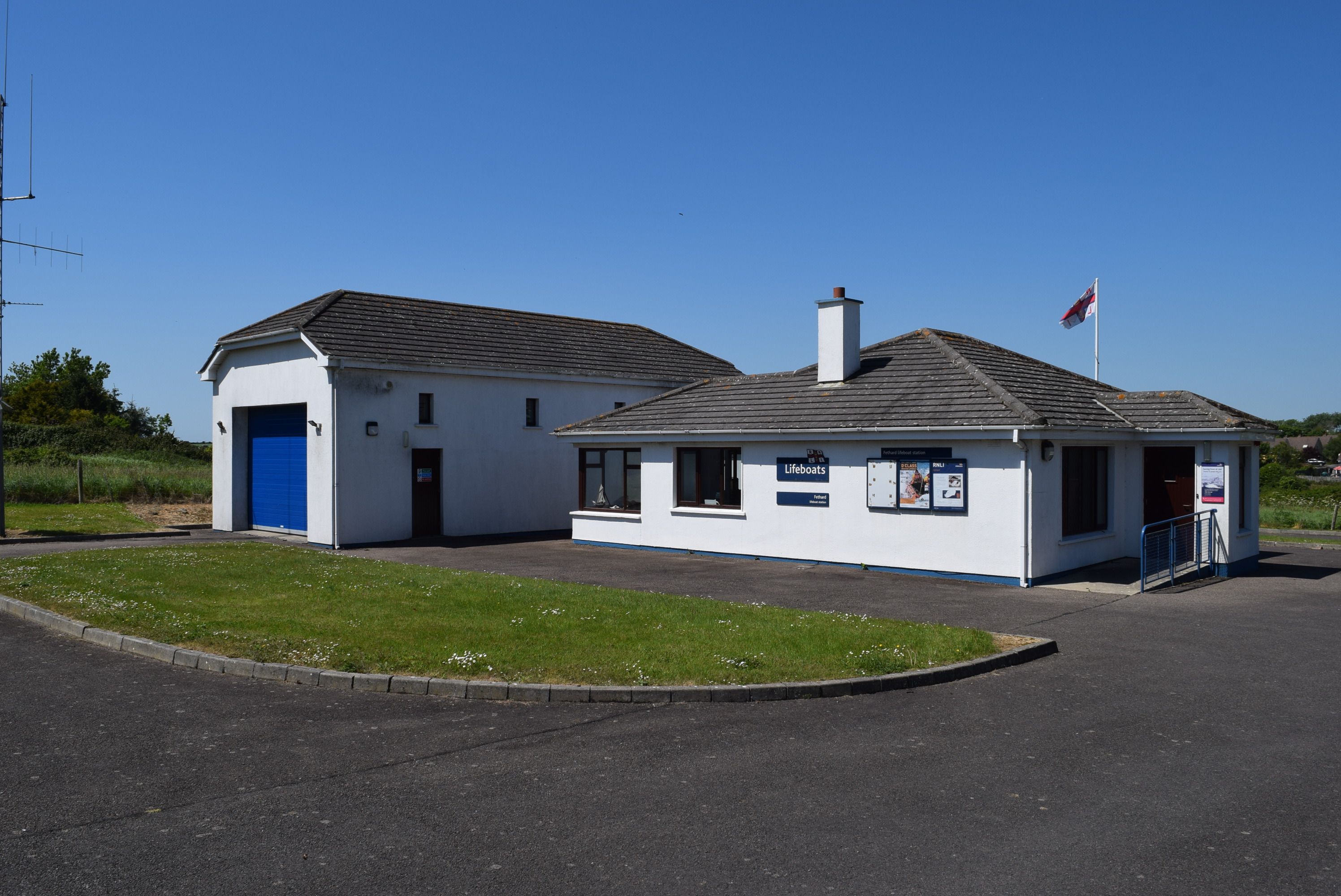
- Fethard lifeboat station in 2025

- Location within Ireland

General information
- Type: Lifeboat station
- Location: Fethard-on-Sea, Ireland
- Coordinates: 52.1877°N 6.8382°W
- Opened: First lifeboat 1886; Current building 2002
- Owner: RNLI

Website
- RNLI: Fethard Lifeboat Station

Fethard Lifeboat Station now occupies a former bungalow at the head of Quay Road in Fethard-on-Sea, a village on the eastern side of the Hook Peninsula, on the south coast of County Wexford in Ireland.

A lifeboat station was established at Fethard by the Royal National Lifeboat Institution (RNLI) in 1886, and operated for 28 years until its closure in 1914.

Fethard RNLI D-class (IB1) Inshore Lifeboat and Launch Vehicle

A station was re-established at Fethard, when an Inshore lifeboat was placed there in 1996. The station currently operates a D-class (IB1) Inshore lifeboat, Naomh Dubhan (D-819), on station since 2018.

== History ==
Ever since its founding in 1824, the Royal National Institution for the Preservation of Life from Shipwreck (RNIPLS), later to become the RNLI in 1854, would award medals for deeds of gallantry at sea, even if no lifeboats were involved. On 15 December 1848, the Emalia was wrecked at Bannow Bay, County Wexford, whilst on passage from Istanbul to Liverpool. 14 crew were lost, but four were saved, thanks to the actions of H.M. Coastguard boatman Robin Gleeson, who was later awarded the RNIPLS Silver Medal.

Following this tragedy, the Rev. Percival Banks Weldon, Rector of Fethard, made a request to the RNIPLS in 1849, for the placement of a lifeboat at Fethard, but the Institution was in a period of decline at that time, and funds were not available.

It was 35 years later, in 1884, that the RNLI decided to establish a lifeboat station at Fethard, on the east side of the Hook peninsula, coinciding with the closure of the existing station at Duncannon, located on the west side of the peninsula. This was brought about when another new station was opened in 1884 at Dunmore East, located on the opposite side of the River Suir estuary from Duncannon, but far closer to the open sea.

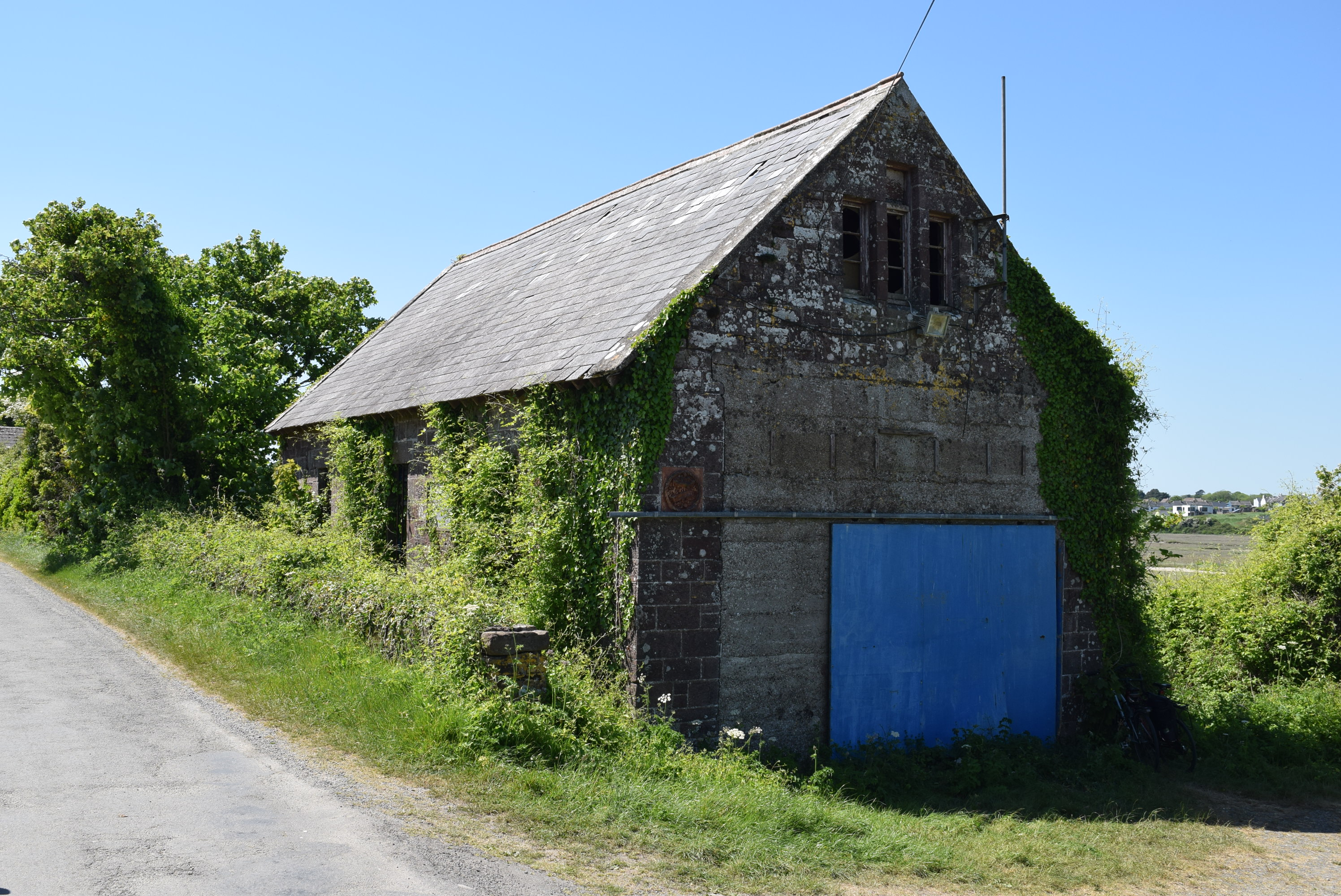
1886 Lifeboat house at Fethard

A 34 ft (10 m) self-righting 'Pulling and Sailing' (P&S) lifeboat, one with oars and sails, along with its launch carriage, was transported free of charge from Bristol to Waterford by the Waterford Steamship Company, arriving at Fethard in July 1886. The bequest of the late Helen Blake of Handcross House, Sussex, received through Her Majesty’s Treasury, covered the entire cost of the station, lifeboat and equipment, and the lifeboat was duly named Helen Blake (ON 100).

A boathouse, costing £511-12s-6d, was constructed on Quay Road, which leads down from Fethard to Fethard Quay and Ingard Point.

== Helen Blake ==
Helen Blake (née Sheridan) of Handcross House, Sussex, was the wife of Peninsular War veteran General Robert Dudley Blake, and inherited his estate on his death in 1850. She then inherited the entire estate of his brother, Sir Francis Blake. When Helen died aged 76 in 1876, she died intestate, and with no children or heirs - their one child had died in infancy - the entire fortune, worth around £120,000, was seized by The Crown.

Helen had actually made a will, with specific legacies of £19,400, but the will had never been signed. Despite this, HM Treasury, who are responsible for the distribution of all assets left by a intestate person, decided to honour most of the specific bequests. This included £6,400 to the RNLI, to purchase two lifeboats, to be placed at stations in Ireland. Two trust funds were set up, the Blake Lifeboat Maintenance Fund and the Blake Lifeboat Reward Fund. In all, the funds provided or maintained six lifeboats:

- General R. Dudley Blake (ON 95), Blackrock, (1885–1909)
- Helen Blake (ON 100), Fethard, (1886–1897)
- Helen Blake (ON 301), Fethard, (1897–1905)
- Helen Blake (ON 546), Fethard, (1905–1914)
- General R. Dudley Blake (ON 593), Blackrock, (1909–1935)
- Helen Blake (ON 809), Poolbeg, (1938–1959)

== Fethard lifeboat disaster ==
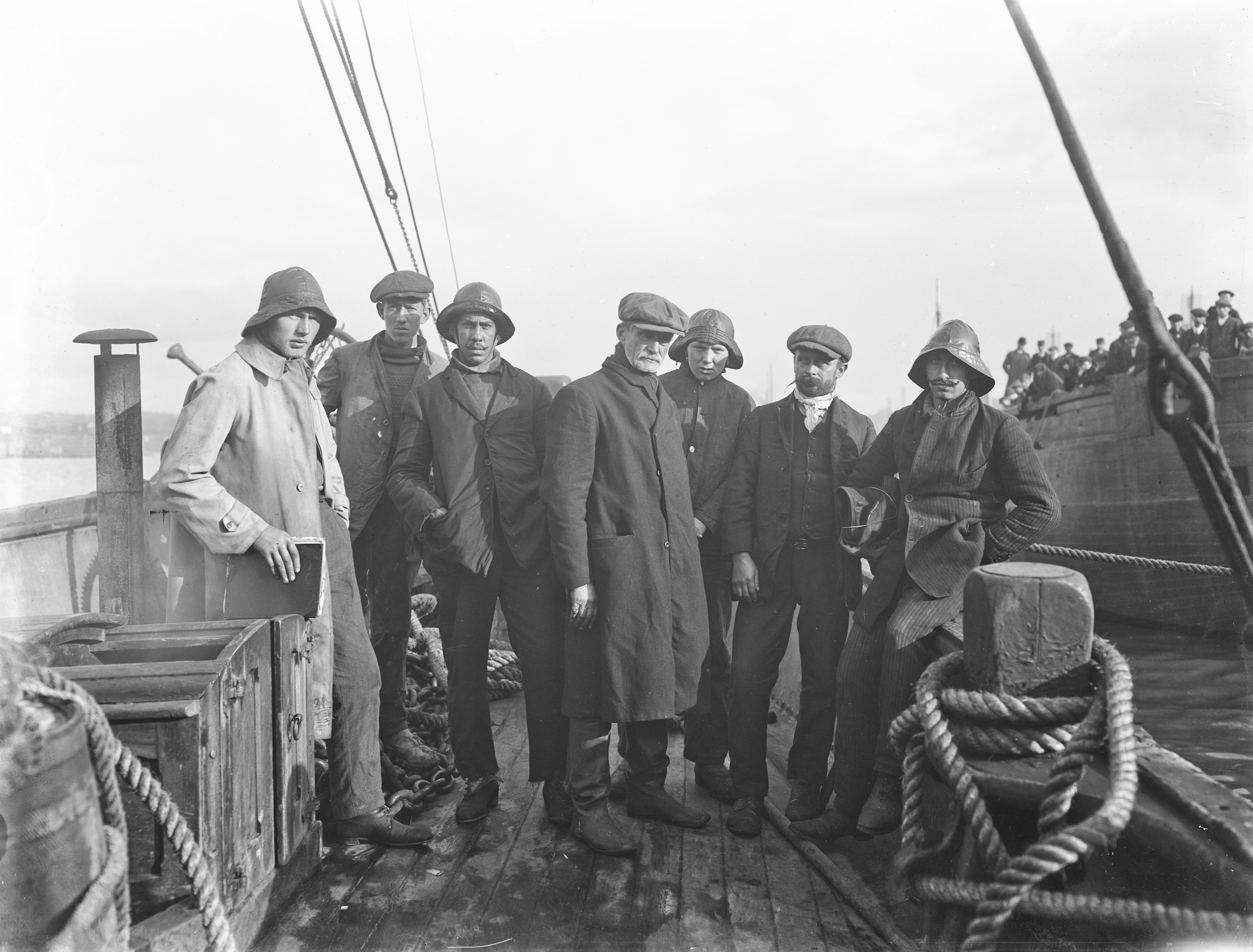
The survivors of the Mexico arrive at Waterford

The Norwegian schooner Mexico got into difficulties during a gale on the afternoon of Friday 20 February 1914. It had a crew of ten and was carrying a cargo of mahogany from South America to Liverpool but ran aground on South Keeragh Island.

The Fethard lifeboat launched to rescue the crew from the Mexico. The lifeboat was about 50 yd (46 m) from the wreck, when it was swamped by a large wave, and capsized. The lifeboat was then also driven against the rocks. Nine of the lifeboat's crew were drowned; Coxswain Christopher Bird, Bowman Thomas Hendrick, William Bird, William Banville, Patrick Cullen, Michael Hendrick, James Morrissey, Patrick Roche, and Patrick Stafford, but five managed to get onto the island. Two of the schooner's crew had managed to get ashore in the ship's boat, and the lifeboat crew managed to bring the remaining eight people onto the island, but now the survivors of the two crews were marooned. Lifeboats from Dunmore East, Kilmore and Wexford all came to help rescue them but the sea conditions meant they were unable to reach the island. The Chief Inspector of Lifeboats arrived from London on Sunday afternoon and went out with the Dunmore East lifeboat to make another attempt but was still unable to reach the stranded men.

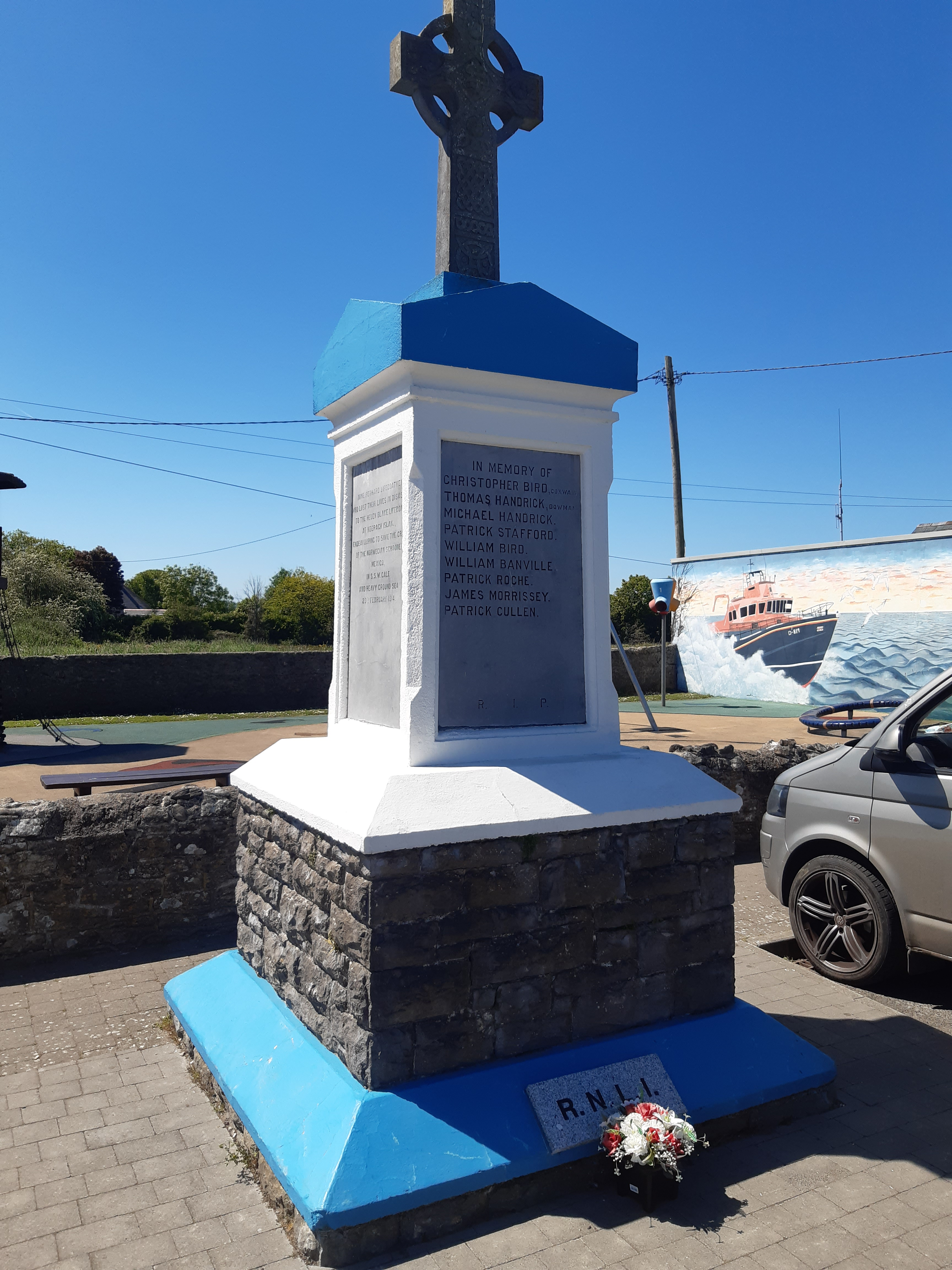
RNLI Lifeboat Memorial Fethard on Sea

Another attempt was made early on Monday morning. The Kilmore lifeboat had returned to its station but the Dunmore East lifeboat had stayed at Fethard, and the other lifeboat remained in Waterford Harbour with the steam tug that had towed it from Wexford. The lifeboats could not land on the island, but eventually a line was got across, on which two of the survivors were guided about 100 yards (91 m) through the water to the Dunmore East lifeboat. James Wickham and William Duggan from the Wexford crew used a skiff from the tug to reach the island and rescued the others, two at a time. On the second trip to the island, the skiff hit the rocks but the hole in the boat was stopped up by a loaf of bread that was wrapped in oilskins.

As well as the nine lifeboat volunteers that drowned, one man from the Mexico died of exposure on the island. The others survived two nights outside in the storm with no shelter. They had no water, just a little brandy and wine which had been saved from the ship; the only food was two tins of meat and a few limpets.

The survivors of the Fethard lifeboat crew were awarded silver medals by the King of Norway.

The RNLI had already decided in 1913 to close Fethard, as a motor lifeboat was being provided for Dunmore East. Following the disaster, the closure was brought forward, confirmed just two months later.

== Inshore lifeboat station ==
On 28 June 1995, a meeting of the Executive Committee of the RNLI resolved to re-establish a lifeboat station at Fethard. The original 1886 boathouse was initially refurbished to accommodate the boat, with a Landrover used for launching, and with crew training completed, the D-class (EA16) Inshore lifeboat Axa Life Inshorer (D-445) was placed at the station on 10 July 1996.

New temporary facilities were opened in January 1999. A bungalow was then purchased in Fethard village, and converted into a lifeboat station, ready for use by 2002. The station is unusual, as it doesn't sit by the water like most lifeboat stations, but it is ideally situated for the lifeboat to be transported quickly and easily to various points around the Hook Peninsula for launching.

== Area of operation ==
The inshore lifeboat at Fethard has a range of 3 hours and top speed of 25 kn (46 km/h). Adjacent stations with All-weather lifeboats are at Kilmore Quay to the east and Dunmore East to the west.

== Fethard lifeboats ==
=== Pulling and Sailing (P&S) lifeboats ===
On station	ON (Note: ON is the RNLI's Official Number of the boat.)	Name	Built	Class	Comments
1886–1897	100	Helen Blake	1885	34-foot self-righting (P&S)	(Note: 34 ft 0 in (10.36 m) x 8 ft 3 in (2.51 m) (10-oared) self-righting (P&S) lifeboat, legacy of Mrs H. Blake of Handcross House, Sussex, built by Woolfe of Shadwell, London, costing £384.); Broken up in 1898.
1897–1905	301	Helen Blake	1878	34-foot self-righting (P&S)	(Note: 34 ft 0 in (10.36 m) x 8 ft 3 in (2.51 m) (10-oared) self-righting (P&S) lifeboat, legacy of Mrs H. Blake of Handcross House, Sussex, built by Woolfe of Shadwell, London, costing £363.); Previously Civil Service No. 1 at Wexford. Sold in 1906.
1905–1914	546	Helen Blake	1905	35-foot self-righting (P&S)	(Note: 35 ft 0 in (10.67 m) x 8 ft 6 in (2.59 m) (10-oared) self-righting (P&S) lifeboat, legacy of Mrs H. Blake of Handcross House, Sussex, built by Thames Ironworks of Blackwall, London, costing £845.); Wrecked on service, 20 February 1914.

=== Inshore lifeboats ===
On station	Op. No. (Note: Op. No. is the RNLI's Operational Number of the boat carried on the hull.)	Name	Class	Comments
1996–1997	D-445	AXA Life Insurer	D-class (EA16)	First deployed as a relief lifeboat in 1993.
1997–1998	D-378	Unnamed	D-class (EA16)	First deployed as a relief lifeboat in 1988.
1998–2007	D-528	Arthur Harris	D-class (EA16)	
2007	D-504	Spirit of the RFC	D-class (EA16)	First stationed at Torbay in 1996.
2007–2018	D-683	Tradewinds	D-class (IB1)	
2018–	D-819	Naomh Dubhan	D-class (IB1)	

== See also ==
- List of RNLI stations
- List of former RNLI stations
- Royal National Lifeboat Institution lifeboats

== Sources ==
- Leonard, Richie; Denton, Tony (2026). Lifeboat Enthusiasts Handbook 2026. Lifeboats Enthusiasts' Society.
