= Gyles' Quay =

Beach on the Cooley Peninsula, County Louth, Ireland

- Beach
- Location within Ireland
- Coordinates: 53°59.16′N 6°14.045′W
- Location: Cooley Peninsula, County Louth, Ireland

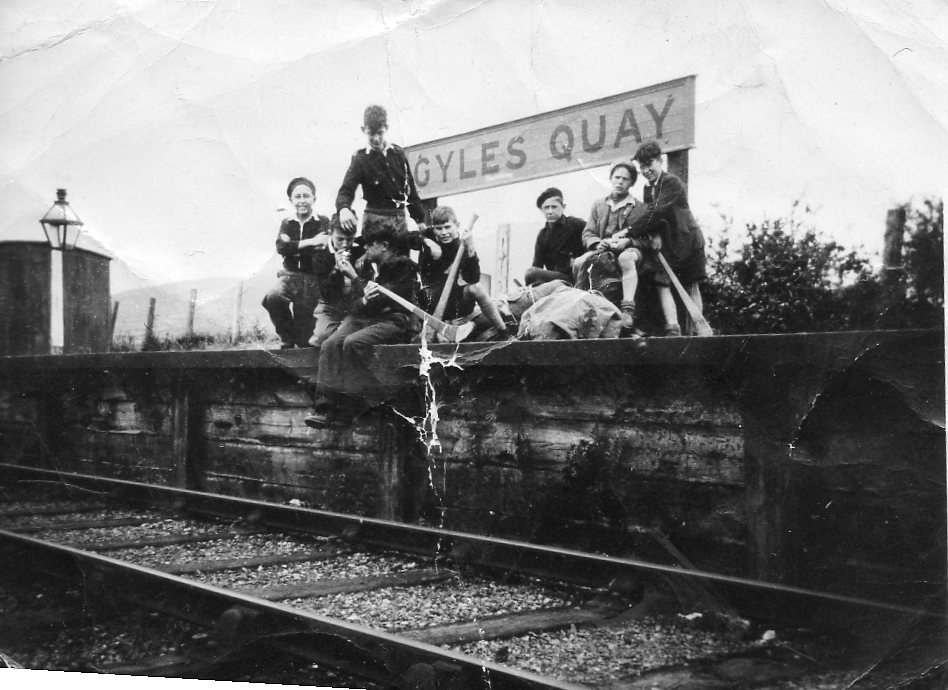
Children and signage at Gyles Quay railway halt

Gyles' Quay is an isolated stretch of beach located 1 km south of the R173/R175 road on the Cooley Peninsula in the north of County Louth in Ireland. It was named after Ross Gyles who built a wood structure there in 1780. It was later rebuilt in stone in 1824 and survives to this day.

The long isolated beach with accessible hinterland made it very attractive to smugglers who used the beach for importing wine and tobacco. In 1823 the authorities constructed a coastguard watch station to limit the illegal imports. Today tourists are drawn to the area for the long beach expanse and the caravan park located overlooking the area.

== Transport ==
Gyles Quay Halt railway station opened on 7 July 1935 and finally closed on 1 January 1952.
