= Battle of New Ross (1643) =

Part of the Irish Confederate Wars

Coordinates: 52.434°N 6.841°W

- Part of the Irish Confederate Wars
Date	18 March 1643
Location	Ballinvegga, County Wexford
Result	Royalist victory

Belligerents
Royalists (Irish and English)	Irish Confederates

Commanders and leaders
Marquess of Ormond; Sir Francis Willoughby	Thomas Preston

Strength
3,700	6,000

Casualties and losses
20	500

Ireland showing New Ross and Ballinvegga

The Battle of New Ross also known as the Battle of Ballinvegga occurred on 18 March 1643 during the Irish Confederate Wars when the Leinster Confederates commanded by Thomas Preston were routed at Ballinvegga in County Wexford by Royalist forces commanded by the Marquess of Ormond.

== Background ==
In the spring of 1643, the Marquess of Ormond, commander of King Charles' forces in Ireland was feeling pressure to take aggressive action against the Confederates in the province of Leinster. On 2 March, Ormond left Dublin with an army of 3,700 and began an advance to the port town of New Ross on the River Barrow. With this expedition, Ormond hoped to disrupt the supply lines of the Confederates; reprovision his own army with materials and foodstuffs; and hopefully destroy the Confederate army of Leinster.

== Royalist campaign to New Ross ==
When Ormond and his army left Dublin on 2 March to begin their march to New Ross with their military train including supply wagons and artillery carts, the Confederates were well aware that a Royalist campaign of some sort was underway. Thomas Preston, the commander of the Confederate forces in Leinster immediately began steps to confront the Royalists. In addition to tracking the movement of the Royalists and attempting to slow them down, Preston began assembling his militias into a single fighting force capable of standing up to Ormond.

New Ross is approximately 120 kilometers south of Dublin. The countryside through which Ormond and his army passed was rebel territory. Throughout this portion of Leinster, the Confederates maintained numerous strongholds and garrisons as all the English had fled shortly after the beginning of the Irish Rebellion in 1641. Along the way, the Royalist engaged in numerous small skirmishes with rebel forces and incurred a short delay when it was necessary to conquest and destroy a small castle in Timolin with their artillery. Ultimately after nine days, the Royalists reached New Ross.

The fortified portion of New Ross sat on the east side of River Barrow with earth ramparts and basic town walls to the north, east, and south. Upon reaching New Ross, Ormond surrounded the town and began a bombardment of the east wall. When a breach opened, Ormond's infantry charged the opening and attempted to enter the town while the artillery shifted its bombardment to the north wall. The Royalist attempt to enter the town failed due to the protected positioning of the town's defenders and rainfall which limited the effect of the Royalist musketeers.

With Confederate reinforcements arriving at New Ross by means of the river, the Irish turned the flow of the battle by advancing out of the town to capture the Royalist artillery that had been battering the north wall and then securing the breach. Ormond responded by ending his attack and sealing New Ross off as best as he could, hoping that a siege would bring the rebels into submission. After six days, however, supplies promised by the government in Dublin failed to arrive and Ormond learned that Thomas Preston and the Confederate Army of Leinster had arrived at the town of Old Ross, eight kilometers to the east. Fearing that his army might be caught between New Ross and the Confederate Army, Ormond decided to end the siege and return north to Dublin.

Had this been the end of the campaign, it would have been a total failure for Ormond and the Royalists as valuable resources had been depleted and New Ross remained a Confederate stronghold.

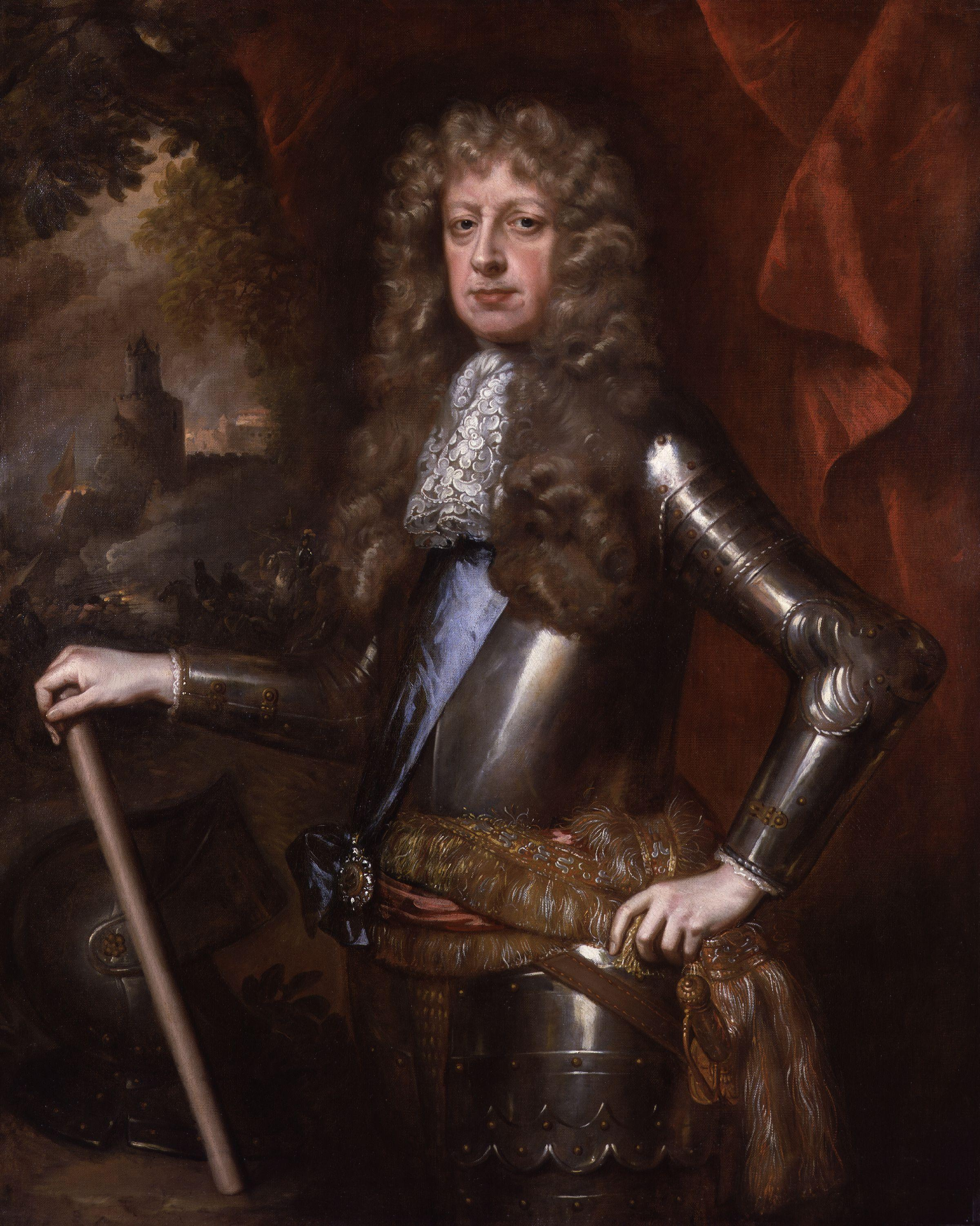
The Marquess of Ormond by William Wissing

== The Battle at Ballinvegga ==
On the morning of 18 March 1643, Ormond set out for Dublin with his army by means of the route he had not taken before. A few kilometers north of New Ross as the Royalists neared the small village of Ballinvegga they observed that they had unintentionally marched toward a place where Preston's Confederate Army had gathered. Preston was not content with allowing Ormond to slink home and had remained in the field hoping to intercept and confront the Royalist army.

The countryside was hilly and Ormond immediately seized a high point and went about positioning his artillery. Next he formed up his ranks with his infantry in the center and cavalry at the flanks. To Ormond's north in a small valley on the other side of a rivulet, Preston and his Confederate army blocked the route. Preston's forces advanced, crossing the stream at a fording point. Just as soon as a Confederate regiment reached the opposite bank, the cavalry began a charge uphill toward the Royalists. Ormond responded by beginning an artillery barrage. The cannon fire took a heavy toll on the Confederate cavalry, immediately sending them back into their own infantry.

Ormond continued his artillery attack, firing upon the rebel infantry in the valley. Preston continued his offensive, sending a second detachment of cavalry up the hill, attempting to seize the Royalist artillery. As the rebel cavalry advanced up the hill, Ormond sent the cavalry from his right flank to meet the oncoming attack. Cavalry skirmishing dominated the battle for a while until Sir Francis Willoughby sent the infantry he commanded along with the remaining Royalist cavalry down the hill into the ranks of the Confederates. Already decimated by the artillery fire, the rebels broke and began to flee back across the river. Willoughby and the Royalists pursued the Confederates across the river causing Preston's entire army to break and flee.

After the battle, it was said of the terrible damage caused by the artillery "what goodlie men and horses lay there all torn and their guttes lying on the ground - armes cast away and strewed over the fields." It was estimated that the Confederates lost approximately 500 men in the battle compared to 20 men slain for the Royalists.

== Aftermath ==
Preston and his army fled west across the River Barrow destroying the bridges behind themselves. This was the first battle with Preston as the commander of the Confederates Leinster Army. He had joined the Irish Rebellion in 1641 after serving in the Irish Regiment of the Spanish army in Flanders during the Eighty Years' War. When Preston was made commander of the Leinster army he was held in high regard for his military skills. Although Preston continued to command the Confederate's Leinster Army, the defeat at Ballinvegga damaged his reputation.

Ormond returned safely to Dublin without further harassment from the Confederates. Even though Ormond had decisively defeated the Confederates at Ballinvegga, he was criticized by his rivals for not capturing New Ross and not totally destroying the Confederates' Leinster Army.

== General references ==
- McKeiver, Philip (2007). A New History of Cromwell's Irish Campaign. Manchester.
- Meehan, Charles Patrick (1882). The Confederation of Kilkenny.
