= Thomas Preston, 1st Viscount Tara =

Irish soldier

Thomas Preston, 1st Viscount Tara (1585 – October 1655) was an Irish soldier of the 17th century. After lengthy service as a mercenary in the Spanish Army, Preston returned to Ireland following the outbreak of the Rebellion of 1641. He was appointed to command the Leinster Army of the Irish Confederacy, enjoying some success as well as a number of heavy defeats such as the Battle of Dungans Hill in 1647 where his army was largely destroyed. Like other Confederate leaders, Preston was a Catholic Royalist. He remained in close contact with the Lord Lieutenant the Marquess of Ormonde, and was a strong supporter of an alliance between Confederates and Royalists against the English Republicans.

Following the Cromwellian conquest of Ireland, he left for France where he joined the Royalist court-in-exile and was made Viscount Tara by Charles II.

== Lineage ==
Preston was a descendant of Robert Preston, 1st Baron Gormanston, who in 1363 purchased the lands of Gormanston, County Meath, and who was Lord Chancellor of Ireland in 1388. The Prestons came originally from the Lancashire town of that name, and arrived in Ireland some time before 1320.

Sir Robert's great-grandson, Robert Preston, was created Viscount Gormanston in 1478; and the latter's great-grandson was Christopher, 4th Viscount Gormanstown (died 1599), whose second son was Thomas Preston. Thomas's mother was Catherine FitzWilliam, daughter of the wealthy Dublin landowner Sir Richard FitzWilliam of Baggotrath Castle. He was thus a close relative of Viscount FitzWilliam.

== Continental service ==
Thomas's elder brother succeeded in the title of Viscount Gormanstown, so Thomas Preston pursued a career in the military. Since Roman Catholics were not allowed to hold state positions in Ireland, he entered the Spanish service and fought in the Thirty Years' War.

Preston was in the same Irish regiment in the Spanish service as Owen Roe O'Neill, and distinguished himself in the defence of Leuven against the French and Dutch in 1635. Between him and Owen Roe O'Neill, there was from the first intense jealousy. There was also some tension between Preston and James Tuchet. In 1644 Tuchet, the Earl of Castlehaven was chosen to lead a major Confederate expedition into Ulster. Unlike Preston, Castlehaven was a military amateur but was he favoured over Preston as he was of a prominent English family.

== Irish Confederacy ==
Preston returned to Ireland after the Irish Rebellion of 1641 to support his fellow Irish Catholics. He was appointed general of Leinster, by the Irish Confederates, which was the largest and best equipped of the Irish Catholic forces.

His performance as a commander in Ireland in the intermittent wars of 1642 to 1652 was mixed. He won widespread praise for his successful siege of Duncannon in 1645, but lost a string of field battles including New Ross (1643) and Dungans Hill (1647). This last battle was disastrous for the Confederates, as their Leinster army was all but wiped out at it. In general, he was skilled in the art of siegecraft, but never had a very good understanding of mobile warfare.

In August 1646, Preston's alcoholism and royalist tendencies led Chief Doctor Owen O'Shiel to leave Preston's command and move to the Ulster Army.

Preston played a major part in the Confederates' internal strife, siding at first with radicals who opposed the first Ormonde peace, but later siding with the moderates who signed a conclusive treaty with Ormonde and the Royalists in 1648. His Royalism was motivated by his Old English roots and his extreme personal dislike of Owen Roe O'Neill, who led the opposing faction. He fought with the defeated Royalists during the Cromwellian conquest of Ireland, defending the city of Waterford until hunger and disease forced him to capitulate. He marched his remaining troops to Galway, the last Irish-held city on the island. In late 1652, after another lengthy siege, Galway too was reduced by plague and lack of supplies. Preston surrendered the city on condition that he and his troops be allowed to leave the country and find employment in the French army. He left the country for exile in France, where the Royalist court was in exile, in 1652.

In 1650 Charles II while in exile created him Viscount Tara; and after his departure from Ireland in 1652 he offered his services to Charles in Paris, where he died in October 1655.

== Family ==
Preston's wife was a Flemish lady of rank, Claire van der Eycken, daughter of Philippe-Charles van der Eycken and Anne de Jauche de Mastaing. She was the sister of Anthone van der Eycken (+ 22 march 1646) lord of Sint-Joris (Beernem in Flanders). Preston had by Claire three children. Louise (born 1624), a daughter by his second wife Catharina Reyns, was the second wife of Sir Phelim O'Neill, while her sister Mary married Colonel Francis Netterville, a grandson of Nicholas Netterville, 1st Viscount Netterville, and after his death married Colonel John Fitzpatrick. His son Anthony succeeded him as 2nd Viscount Tara, a title that became extinct on the murder by Sir Francis Blundell, 3rd Baronet and his brothers of Thomas, 3rd Viscount, in 1674. Charles II, who during his exile lodged with the Preston family in Bruges, spoke warmly of the children and their guardian Miss Warren in his later years, but did nothing to repair their ruined fortunes: the younger Thomas in 1670 was said to be penniless.

== See also ==
- William Preston (Virginia soldier)
- William Preston (poet)

== Bibliography ==
- O Siochru, Micheal. Confederate Ireland, 1642–1649. A Constitutional and Political Analysis. Four Courts Press, 1999.

Peerage of Ireland
New creation	Viscount Tara; 1650–1655	Succeeded by Anthony Preston
