= Passage East =

Passage East Irish: An Pasáiste
- Village
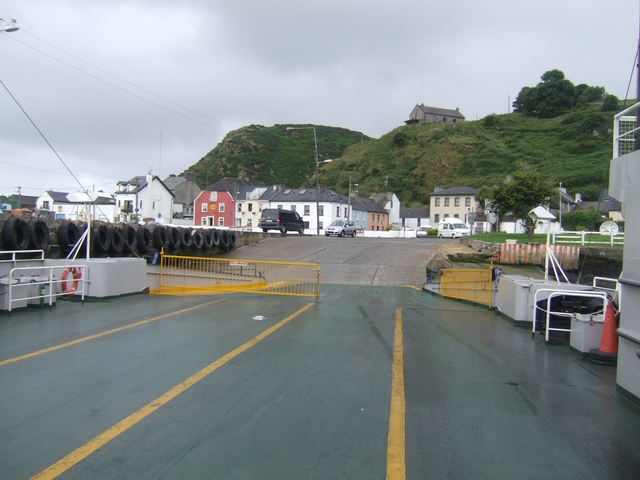
- Passage East as seen from the car ferry

- Location in Ireland
- Coordinates: 52°14′21″N 6°58′22″W
- Country: Ireland
- Province: Munster
- County: County Waterford

Population (2022)
  - Total: 634
- Time zone: UTC+0 (WET)
  - Summer (DST): UTC-1 (IST (WEST))

Passage East (Irish: An Pasáiste, meaning 'the passage') is a fishing village in County Waterford, Ireland, situated on the west bank of Waterford Harbour. It is 12 km from Waterford city 10 km from Dunmore East and 21 km from Tramore.

== History ==
On 23 August 1170, Strongbow landed at Passage East with 200 knights and 1,000 men-at-arms, a year after the first Normans had landed at Bannow, symbolising the beginning of the Norman invasion of Ireland.

Nearby are the ruins of Geneva Barracks, a one-time planned utopian colony turned into a notorious prison and point of departure for thousands of rebels transported from the country for participation in the 1798 rebellion.

== Tourism and fishing ==
Passage East has a long beach which is used for fishing bass, codling, whiting, various flatfish and pollocks. It is possible to walk from Passage to Woodstown when the tide is out. Passage East also has a natural mussel bed in which it is possible to dig for ragworm. Lug can be dug all the way along the coast to Woodstown.

The Waterford Estuary Mussel Festival is held each September in Passage East and some nearby villages.

== Transport ==
=== Car ferry ===
Passage East Ferry Company Limited, which has been in operation since 1982, links the village, and County Waterford as a whole, with County Wexford, specifically the village of Ballyhack. A journey on the company's vessel, The Tintern, which has a capacity for 28 cars, saves motorists a road journey of approximately 55 km. There has been some local concern in recent years about the level of traffic through the village generated by the car ferry.

=== Bus service ===
TFI Local Link operate the bus route 358, linking Passage East to Waterford, Dunmore East and Tramore.

== Sport ==
The local GAA club, Passage GAA, concentrates on hurling. Its best known players are Sean Cullinane and Eoin Kelly. Eoin Kelly won Passage's first All-Star award in 2008. The football club associated with the Passage area is Gaultier.

== See also ==
- List of towns and villages in Ireland
- Crooke Preceptory
