= Siege of Duncannon =

Siege during the 11 Years' War

Coordinates: 52.220771°N 6.936627°W

- Part of the Irish Confederate Wars
Date	20 January – 18 March 1645 (1 month, 3 weeks and 5 days)
Location	Duncannon, County Wexford
Result	Confederate victory

Belligerents
Irish Confederates	(England) English Parliamentarians

Commanders and leaders
Viscount Tara	Baron Esmonde

Strength
1,300 men, 1 mortar, 4 cannon	200 men, 18 cannon, 4-7 ships

Casualties and losses
67 dead	27 killed in the town Flagship Great Lewis sunk, crew and 7034 soldiers drowned

Ireland and Duncannon

The siege of Duncannon took place in 1645, during the Irish Confederate Wars. An Irish Catholic Confederate army under Thomas Preston besieged and successfully took the town of Duncannon in County Wexford from an English Parliamentarian garrison. The siege was the first conflict in Ireland in which mortars were utilized.

== Background ==
At the outbreak of the Irish Rebellion of 1641, most of south-eastern Ireland fell to the Catholic insurgents. Roughly 1,000 rebels blockaded Duncannon, which was heavily fortified and contained an English garrison of about 300 men. Around 150 of the English troops were killed in forays against the Irish at nearby Redmond's Hall, but without siege artillery, or expertise in siege warfare, the rebels were unable to take Duncannon.

Hostilities continued throughout 1642, as the Irish, now organised as the Irish Confederacy raided the town's hinterland. As in much of Ireland, the conflict was bitter. In one incident, Laurence Esmonde, Lord Esmonde, the Royalist commander hung 16 Irish prisoners who had been taken at nearby Ramsgrange. In response, the Irish executed 18 English prisoners whom they had been holding.

In 1643, because of his need for troops to fight in the English Civil War, Charles I signed a ceasefire with the Irish Confederates. As a result hostilities between Duncannon and the Catholic-held surrounding area were suspended.

== Esmonde Changes sides ==
However, in 1644, the English garrison of Cork, under Lord Inchiquin, unhappy with the Royalist truce with the Irish Confederates, declared for the English Parliament, who were to remain hostile to Irish Catholic forces throughout the 1640s. Esmond, under pressure from elements of his garrison, also changed to the side of Parliament and effectively re-declared war on the Catholic Confederates. His motives are unclear: though he was a Protestant convert, the Esmonde family were Anglo-Irish Roman Catholics, and he owed his entire advancement to the Crown.

Duncannon was a strategically important town for two reasons. Firstly, it had formidable defences. Secondly and more importantly, its guns overlooked the sea route to Waterford and New Ross, two of the most important Catholic-held towns and also ports at which the Confederates received military aid from Catholic Europe.

Needing to keep this channel open and also fearing the presence of an English garrison deep in their territory, the Confederates' Supreme Council in Kilkenny despatched Thomas Preston, general of their Leinster Army, to take Duncannon in January 1645. Preston had at his disposal 1,300 men, four cannons and a mortar. The mortar, the first of its kind to be used in Ireland had been donated by Spain the previous year and was commanded by a French military engineer named Nicholas La Loue. La Loue had served with Preston in Flanders and was chief of engineering in the Leinster Army.

== The siege ==
Duncannon possessed formidable defences. For one thing, it was located on a peninsula and could only be approached from the north, the other three sides jutting out into the sea. Just off the town were docked four Parliamentarian ships, which were supplying Duncannon with food and reinforcements. Secondly, it possessed two lines of fortifications, the outer line being a more modern low deep rampart protected by a dry ditch and the inner wall being a medieval curtain wall, complete with three towers. However, it had two grave weaknesses, first, it was overlooked by a hill to the north, from which an attacker could fire into the town and secondly the water supply was also located outside the walls.

Preston arrived at Duncannon on 20 January and proceeded to construct a ring of trenches which cut off Duncannon on its landward side. From the hill that overlooked the town to the north, his guns were able to fire on a squadron of four Parliamentarian ships that were docked off Duncannon and providing the town with supplies. The Flagship, the Great Louis was badly damaged, its mast wrecked by cannon fire, and it took several more hits from the mortar as it tried to get away. The ship sunk in deep water, drowning its crew and 200 soldiers who had been on board.

Having cut off Duncannon's supply from the sea, Preston proceeded to dig saps closer to the walls, the ultimate aim being to bring his cannon close enough to the walls in order to blast a breach and open the way for an assault. His engineers also dug a mine underneath one of the town's bastions. All the while, the town's defenders were kept under a bombardment by the mortar and, as the Confederate troops got closer to the walls, by sharpshooters. On 12 March, one such sniper killed the fort's second in command, one Captain Lurcan, who was hit in the head by a bullet.

On 16 March, by which time the Irish trenches were, 'within pistol shot of the walls', Preston ordered the mine to be exploded, opening a breach in Duncannon's outer walls. The Irish infantry then assaulted the town, but were beaten off with some losses. The following day, St Patricks Day, Preston tried again and this time his troops succeeded in taking the town's outer, more modern walls but were stopped at Duncannon's inner, medieval ramparts. They had succeeded in occupying one of the town's towers for an hour before being beaten back. Geoffrey Barron, a Confederate politician, who kept a diary of the siege, reported that 24 Irish soldiers were killed in the two assaults.

== The Surrender ==
At this point, Preston summoned Esmonde to surrender, before he had to, 'proceed to extremities'. This was a delicate threat, implying that if the town fell to an assault, its defenders would be put to the sword - as was customary in contemporary siege warfare. Esmonde was also advised to surrender by the Parliamentarian vice admiral, William Smith, who was anchored offshore with seven ships, but could not break through to relieve the town. In a letter that reached Esmonde on 11 March, Smith had warned him that, 'if the rebels take the fort by storming it, they will undoubtedly put you all to death...you should agree with thy adversary while thou art in the way'. Esmond had Smith's letter publicly read to his troops after the assaults of 16–17 March to discourage those who favoured holding out.

Alongside the risk of massacre, the English garrison was also very low on gunpowder and water. The town's only source of fresh water, a well, was behind the Confederate siege lines.

In light of these facts, Esmonde formally surrendered Duncannon to Preston on 18 March. The Confederates took possession of the town but its garrison was allowed to march away to Youghal, which was in Protestant hands. However, they had to leave behind the town's 18 artillery pieces. Esmonde himself died a few days after the end of the siege. Preston would go on to briefly besiege Youghal, but bad weather, a lack of supplies and squabbling with Castlehaven, the Confederate Munster general, put an end to his campaign for that winter.

The siege was of importance in that it re-opened the sea route into Waterford and eliminated a hostile English garrison in Confederate territory. Preston, who had for many years been the Spanish military governor of Leuven was highly experienced in siege warfare and his conduct of the siege drew widespread praise. Not only did he take the town, but he did so at a relatively low cost. Sixty-seven Confederate soldiers died in the siege, of whom roughly 30 died of disease. Given that the campaign was conducted in mid-winter, in an age when disease routinely killed many more soldiers than combat, this represented a considerable logistical achievement on the part of the Irish general.

The Great Lewis, the Parliamentarian ship sunk during the siege, was re-discovered in 1999 and raised in 2004.

== The Cromwellian siege ==
Duncannon was besieged again during the Cromwellian conquest of Ireland by the forces of the English Parliament, as part of the Siege of Waterford. It repelled a siege by Oliver Cromwell in 1649 but surrendered after a lengthy blockade by Henry Ireton in 1650.

== Sources ==
- Padraig Lenihan, Confederate Catholics at War, Cork University Press, Cork 2002 (pp. 178–187) .
- "Warship mystery". Sunday Mirror. 24 August 2003. Archived from the original on 17 September 2009 – via FindArticles.
- TV programme about the Great Lewis
- Padraig Lenihan (ed.), Conquest and Resistance in Seventeenth Century Ireland
