= Duncormick =

Village in County Wexford, Ireland

Duncormick Dún Chormaic
- Village
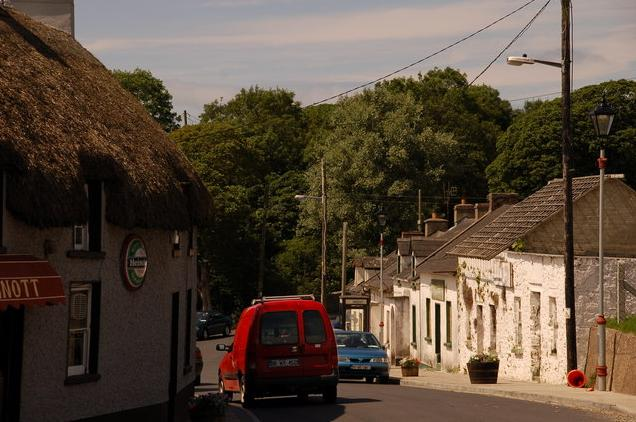
- Duncormick village centre

- Location in Ireland
- Coordinates: 52°13′29″N 6°39′16″W
- Country: Ireland
- Province: Leinster
- County: Wexford
- Elevation: 3 m (9.8 ft)

Population (2016)
  - Total: 116
- Time zone: UTC+0 (WET)
  - Summer (DST): UTC-1 (IST (WEST))
- Area code: 051
- Irish Grid Reference: S9202508926

Duncormick or Duncormac (Irish: Dún Chormaic) is a rural village and surrounding community located in County Wexford, Ireland. At the time of the 2016 census, the village of Duncormick had a population of 116 people. The village is 18 kilometres (11 mi) south-west of Wexford town, close to the fishing village of Kilmore Quay which is one of the largest fishing harbours in Ireland. 'Duncormick' is sometimes used to refer not only to a village, but also to the rural area surrounding it. The village is in a townland and civil parish of the same name.

== Location ==
Duncormick is located on the River Muck and on the Bannow Drive, a tourist trail and signposted route through four Wexford villages including Cullenstown, Bannow and Wellingtonbridge. Duncormick is close to a number of beaches, and a forty-minute drive from Rosslare Europort, to the east, which serves Britain and France. Waterford Airport lies to the west.

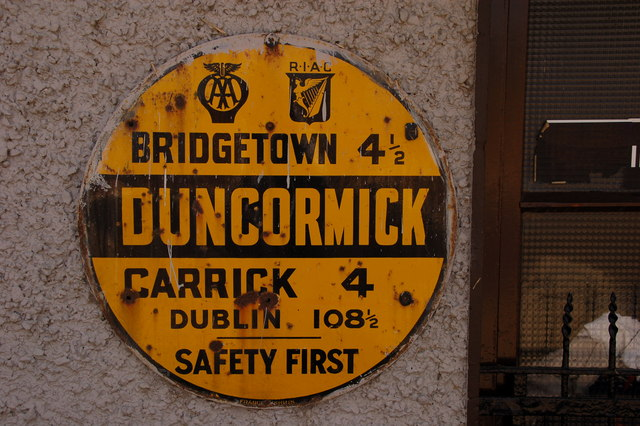
AA location roundal

== History ==
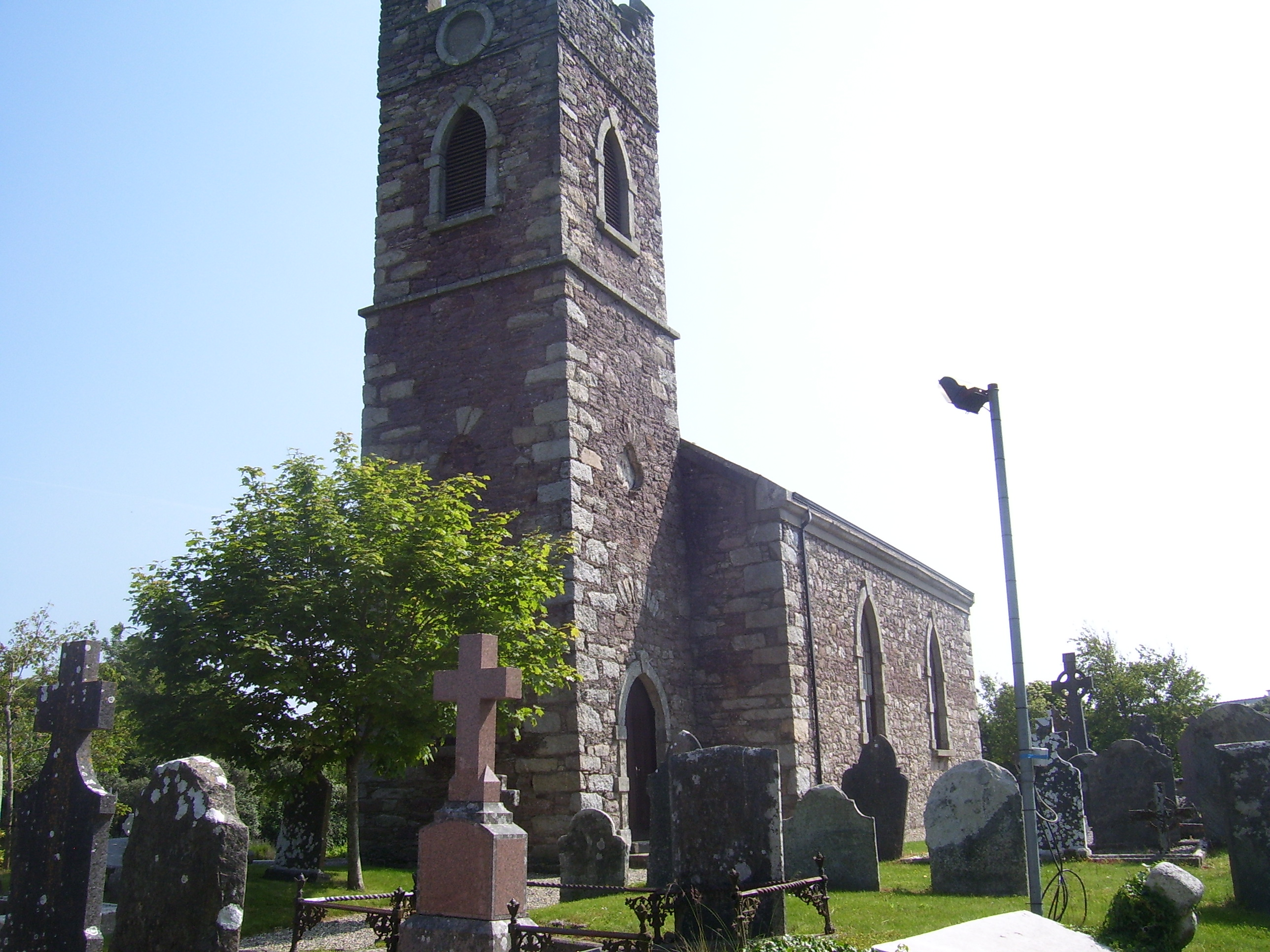
Duncormick Church

The name Duncormick derives from the Irish Dún Cormaic, meaning "Cormac's fortress". For many centuries before the arrival of the Normans in 1169, this part of the country was inhabited by the Tuatha Ui Bairche (their name and territory is the basis for the modern barony of Bargy). In the sixth century, the Ui Bairche had a powerful chief named Cormac Mac Diarmata who was for a time hailed as King of Leinster. It is possible that Cormac had a base in Duncormick. In that early Christian, pre-Viking period, Duncormick was a prominent coastal settlement. There is a clay mound that rises behind the site of the old water mill and the modern Peace Garden, which may have been part of structures associated with this period.

In the 12th century, the first Norman forces arrived on three single-masted Longships at Bannow Bay, County Wexford. Arriving in May 1169, they had sailed from Milford Haven in Wales, and on board were Normans, Welshmen and Flemings. Their leader was Robert FitzStephen, a Norman-Welsh warlord, and they made camp on Bannow Island, separated from the mainland by a narrow channel which has since silted up. A day later, two further ships arrived under the command of Maurice de Prendergast, bringing their numbers to around 600. They were joined by 500 Irish warriors led by Dermot MacMurrough, King of Leinster. From Bannow the combined armies headed towards Wexford, a Viking seaport approximately 32 km away. There was a brief skirmish at Duncormick, before they continued on to assault Wexford's walls during the Siege of Wexford (1169).

By the mid-19th century, the 1850s, the village of Duncormick had a population of about 250. The nearby Bridgetown Canal was constructed between 1850 and 1853. It is 8 km in length and less than 5 minutes walk from the village centre. The canal served the communities of Bridgetown and Duncormick. While initially part of an extensive drainage and reclamation scheme, it was subsequently used as a transport system. Traffic was still common on the canal in the early 20th century, and the canal remained in use up to the 1940s.

Into the 20th century, and on a sunny day in August 1940, a German war plane attacked the communities of Duncormick and Campile. It released four bombs over Duncormick railway station. However, the bombs missed the station, making four huge craters in a nearby turnip field. The nearby community of Campile was not so lucky, and two people were killed. Not long afterward Duncormick railway station was one of a number of rural railway stations in Ireland to be closed.

== Transport ==
Old Bridge in the centre of the village

=== Road ===
Duncormick has a cross roads in the village centre serving the R736, a regional road.

Bus services include the Wexford Local Link route 388 with several buses to and from Wexford town every day (as at 2024).

=== Railway ===
Duncormick was once connected to Ireland's rail network by Duncormick railway station. In 1970 it was one of many rural stations, listed by Dáil Éireann, as having a revenue of less than £10,000 per annum. The station subsequently closed, along with many other rural stations across the country. However, both Bridgetown railway station and Wellingtonbridge railway station remained open until September 2010. The line continues to be maintained and from time to time is used for empty stock movements.

== Amenities ==
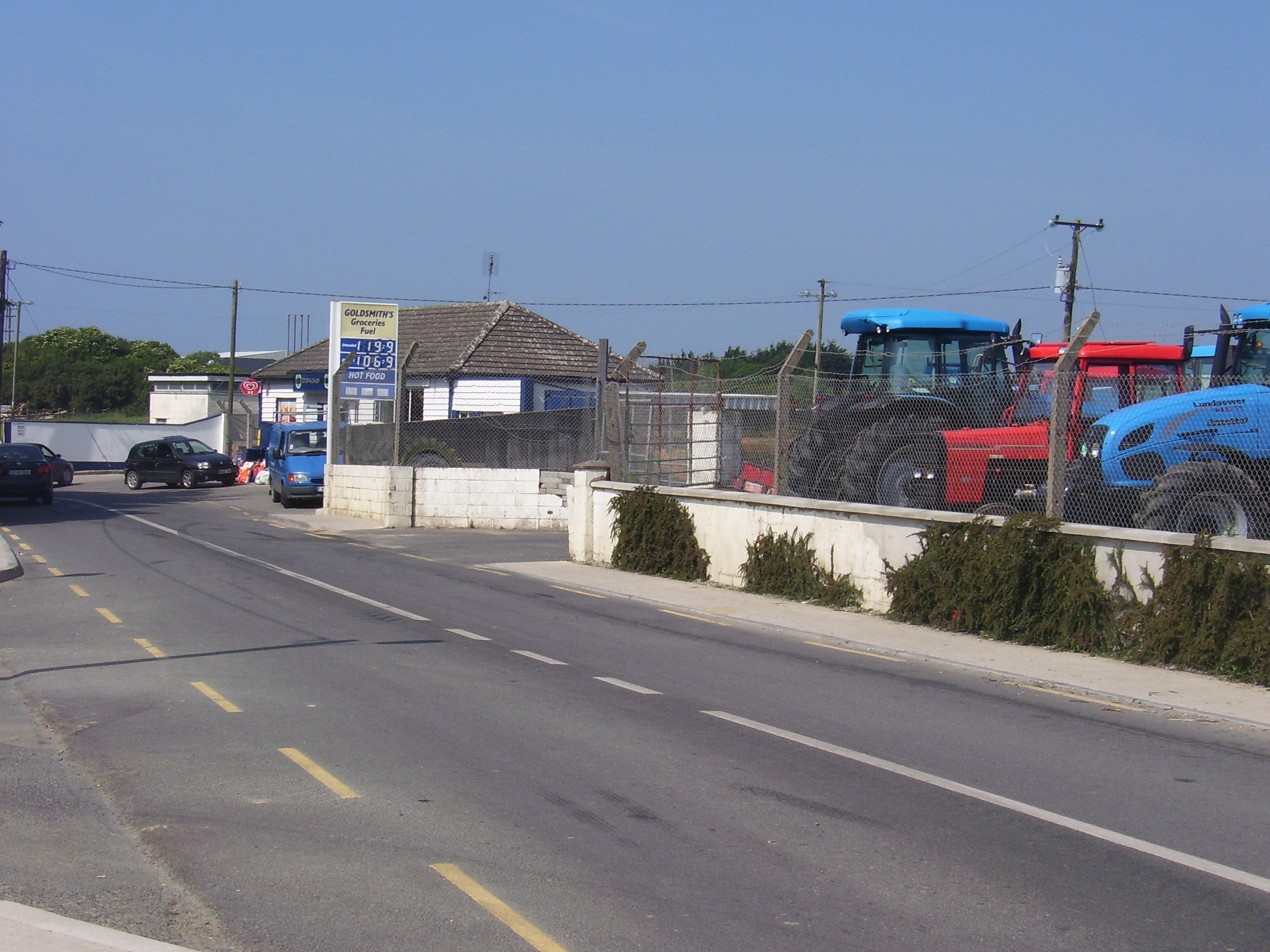
Village shop and tractor sheds

The village of Duncormick has a church, car dealership and health spa. A former filling station and post office have since closed. Other business in the area include an agricultural machinery sales business, a ladies hairdresser, a horse riding facility and a doctor's surgery. A number of B&B's are also located in and around the village.

There is one pub in the village, 'Sinnotts', which is partially thatched. A second pub, 'The Legend', has since closed down.

== Sport ==
Soccer, hurling and gaelic football are common sports in the area, including at Bridgetown Vocational College there are gym facilities.

Nearby community centres, such as the Stella Maris Community Centre at Kilmore Quay, incorporates a full tournament-sized badminton court with facilities for volleyball, basketball, pool, and table tennis.

St. Annes achieved a double triumph in the year 2001, winning both the county hurling and football championship. They also won the county football championship in 2002. Bannow Ballymitty also achieved a double in 2003 winning both the intermediate football and junior hurling titles.

== Tourism ==
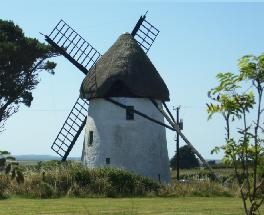
Windmill near Duncormick

Duncormick is visited by walkers, equestrians and cyclists, and there is fishing in both the nearby river and the ocean. The beaches at Ballyteigue Bay and Cullenstown are close by and Ballyteigue Burrow is a nature reserve which is visited by birdwatchers. It is a protected sand dune system and a habitat for wild flowers and butterflies which covers a 9 km coastal stretch. It was established as a national nature reserve in 1987.

A plaque on the summer cottage of P.J. McCall, commemorates the author of several ballads including "Boullavogue", a song associated with the 1798 rebellion. Nearby on the same road is a deserted Norman settlement known locally as The Seven Castles. It is visible from outside Wellingtonbridge. This historic estuary and peninsula is now home to birds including brent geese, wigeon, teal and some other wintering wildfowl. Close to Cullenstown village is a bungalow decorated with seashells.

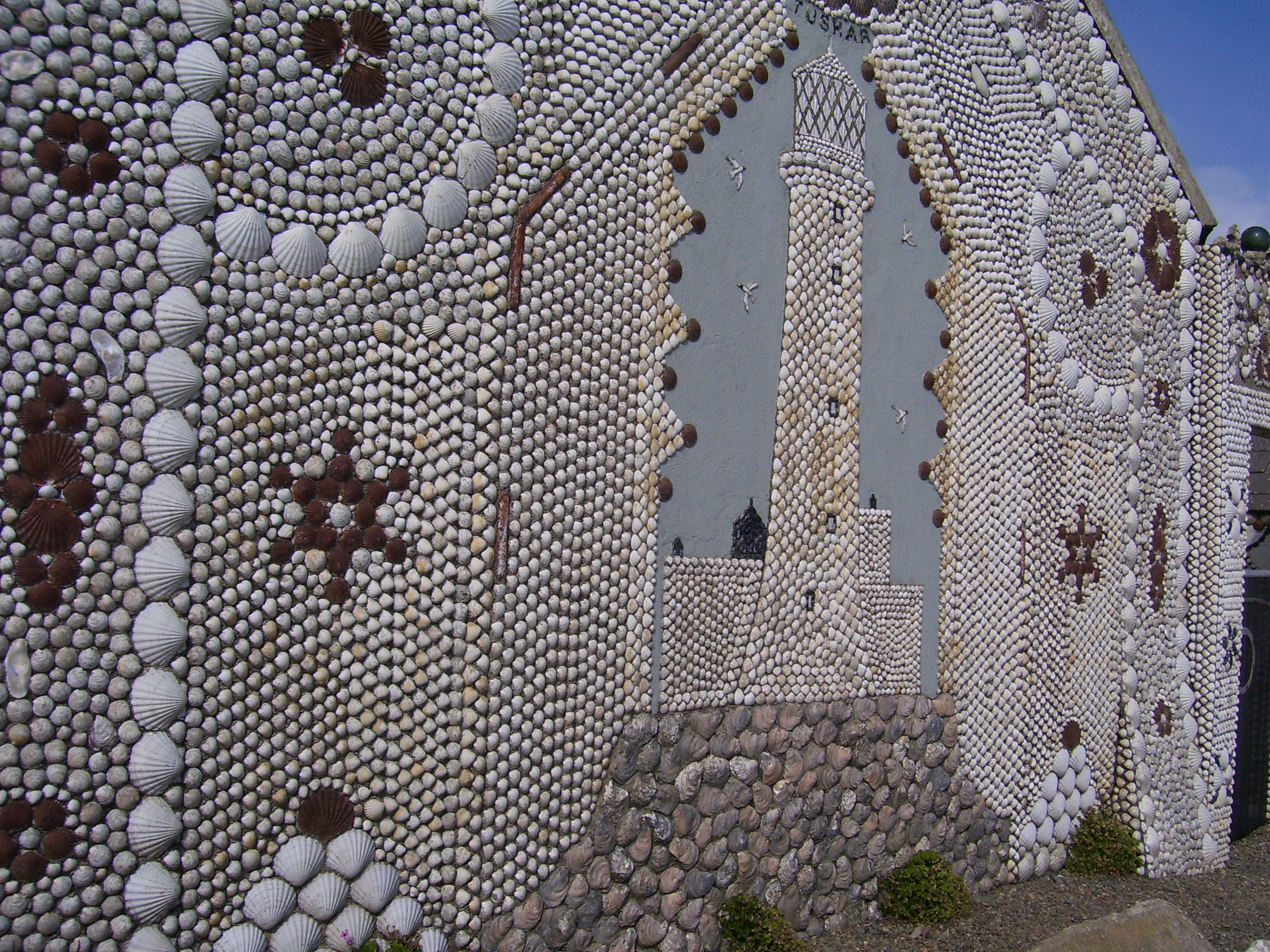
Seashells on bungalow

=== Walking routes ===
A signposted coastal cross-country walk, from Duncormick to Kilmore Quay, starts at an old bridge on the Kilmore Quary road. The path trails along the river/canal for 30 minutes, before reaching a small beach and continues along the beach for a further 30 minutes to another large bridge. The trail reaches the protected sand dune system of Ballyteigue Burrow. Walking along the beach for a further 2 hrs leads towards Kilmore Quay and the Saltee Islands. The route ends at Kilmore Quay fishing village.

A shorter road, from Duncormick to Cullenstown, starts along rural roads, passing along the Irish Sea coast.

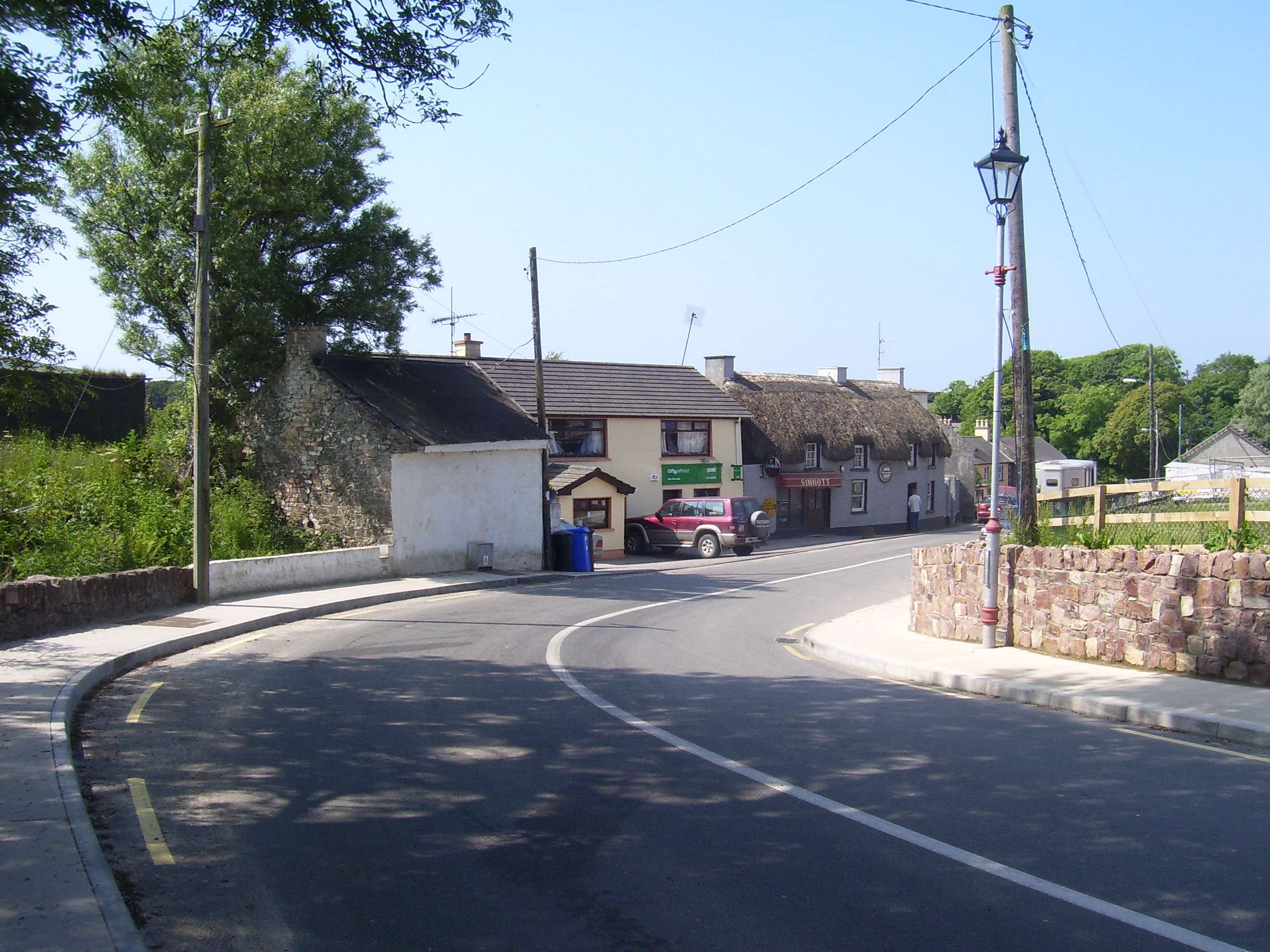
Village centre

=== Events ===
The Killag Show (also known as the Bannow and Rathangan Agricultural Show) is held close to Duncormick every July. The nearby Kilmore Quay Seafood Festival is also held in the summer (usually mid July).

Other nearby events include the JFK Dunbrody Festival at New Ross, Phil Murphy Weekend at Carrig on Bannow, Viking Boat Festival at the Irish National Heritage Park, and Tagoat Steam Rally.

== Education ==
Since no educational establishments are located in Duncormick Village anymore, students travel to schools in other areas, sometimes via school bus. Schools used by the local community include primary (national) schools in places like Rathangan, and secondary schools like Bridgetown Vocational College in nearby Bridgetown.

== See also ==
- List of towns and villages in Ireland
