= Shelburne (barony) =

Barony in County Wexford, Ireland

Shelburne Síol Bhroin (Irish)
- Barony
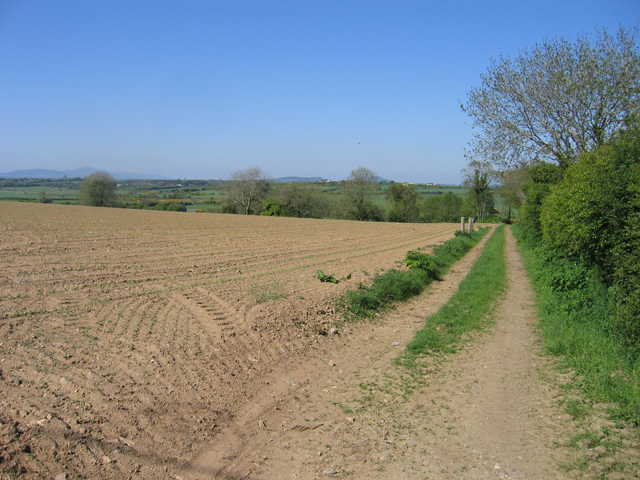
- Farmland near Tullerstown

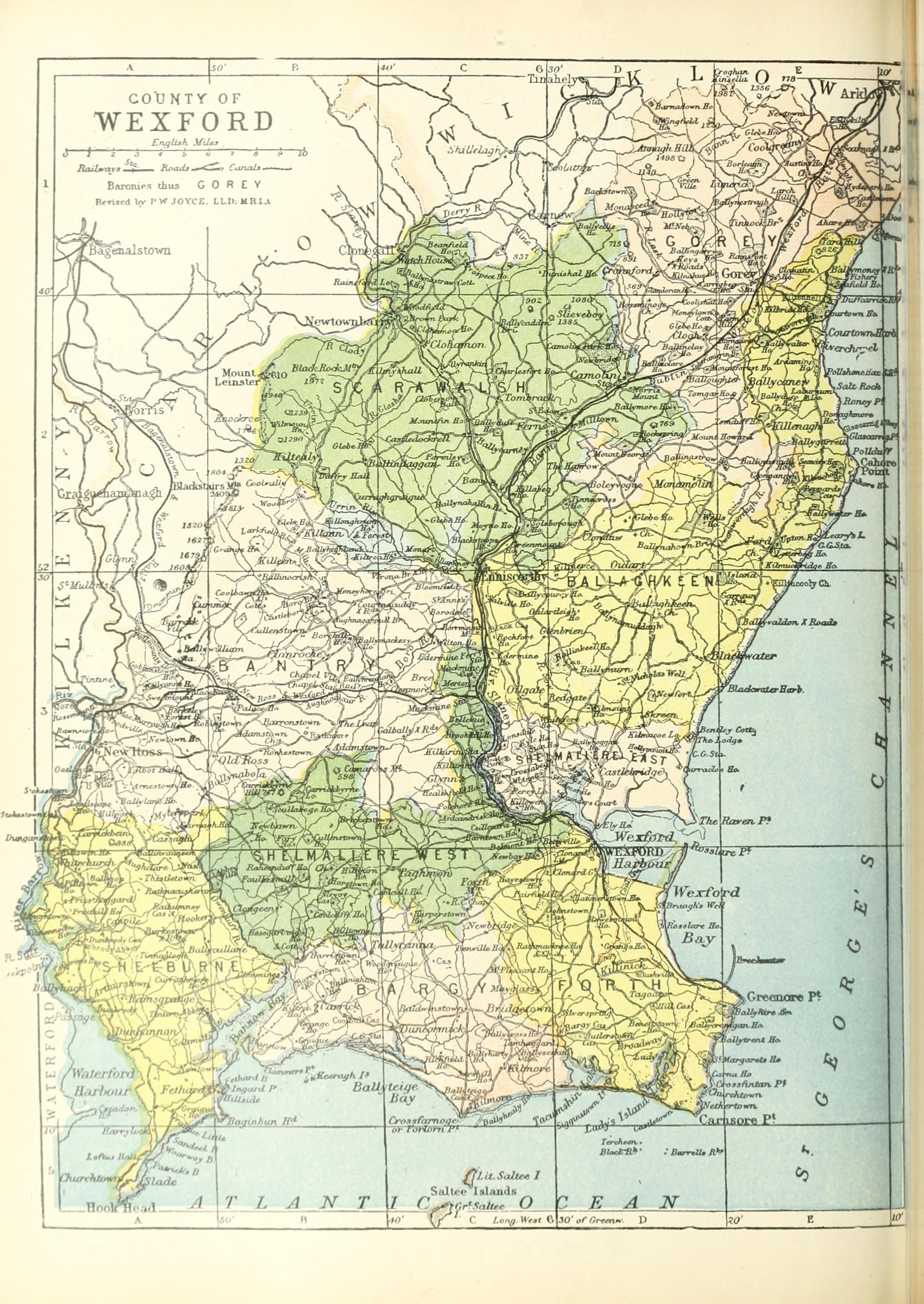
- Barony map of County Wexford, 1900; Shelburne barony is in the southwest, coloured yellow.

- Location within Ireland
- Coordinates: 52°18′N 6°54′W
- Sovereign state: Ireland
- Province: Leinster
- County: Wexford

Area
  - Total: 206.8 km^{2} (79.8 sq mi)

Shelburne (Irish: Síol Bhroin [ʃiːl̪ˠ wɾˠɪnʲ]) is a historical barony in southwest County Wexford, Ireland.

Baronies were mainly cadastral rather than administrative units. They acquired modest local taxation and spending functions in the 19th century before being superseded by the Local Government (Ireland) Act 1898.

== History ==
The barony takes its name from the local tribe, the Síol Bhroin (seed of Bran), also Síol mBroin of Dubhthir Laighean ("the black land of Leinster," Anglicised as "Duffry"). The tribe claimed descent from Bran Fionn ("Bran the Fair"), a son of Lorcán mac Cellaig, a 9th-century king of Leinster.

In the Gaelic Ireland period, part of Shelburne barony was ruled by the O'Duibhgan (O'Duggan). An Uí Cuilinn (O'Cullen) sept was near the parish of Tintern.

=== Derived uses of the name ===
English settlers preserved the name: in 1688 James II and VII awarded Elizabeth, Lady Petty the title of Baroness Shelburne. Her son Charles became Baron Shelburne at the same time. The younger son Henry became Baron Shelburne in 1699 and Earl of Shelburne in 1751. A relative, John Petty, received the title in 1753, and his son was William Petty, 2nd Earl of Shelburne, who was Prime Minister of Great Britain in 1782–83. Many places in the British Empire were named "Shelb[o]urne" in his honour. The Shelbourne Hotel in Dublin, perhaps the city's most famous hotel, was named in honour of the former Prime Minister in 1830. Shelbourne Road was also named for the prime minister, and in turn, Shelbourne F.C., a major Dublin soccer club, was named for he road in 1895.

== Geography ==
Shelburne is in the southwest of the county; to its west is the River Barrow and the borders with County Waterford and County Kilkenny. It includes the Hook Peninsula. Its eastern boundary mostly follows the Owenduff River; Shelmaliere West is on the opposite bank.

== List of settlements ==
Settlements within the historical barony of Shelburne include:

- Arthurstown
- Ballycullane
- Campile
- Duncannon
- Saltmills
- Slade
