= Slieve Coillte =

Hill in County Wexford, Ireland

Slieve Coillte (from Irish Sliabh Coiltair, meaning 'mountain of Coltar') is a hill in the south of County Wexford, Ireland. The hill is the highest point on the Hook peninsula, with an elevation of 268.5 metres (881 ft).

Villages around Slieve Coillte include New Ross, Slaught, Cassagh, Gusserane, Campile, Ramsgrange and Duncannon. On a good day the whole of the Hook peninsula can be overseen, up to the 12th Century Hook lighthouse on Hook Head, one of the oldest operational lighthouses in the world.

== Hillwalking ==
Slieve Coillte is popular with hillwalkers, with thousands of people climbing the mountain every year. A 3 kilometres (1.9 mi) road leads to a viewpoint on the summit. The road is accessible by car, so the view from Slieve Coillte can also be enjoyed without a walk to the top. Starting from the viewpoint is a 1.3 kilometres (0.81 miles) circular track that is also suitable for inexperienced walkers.

On the south side of the hill is the John F. Kennedy Arboretum with approximately 4,500 species of trees and shrubs on 620 acres (250 ha).

== History ==
At the summit there is also a Rebellion memorial stone that states: "The rebels camped on Slieve Coillte from the 7th to 10th June. Bagenal Harvey resigned his command here. He was succeeded by Fr Philip Roche. A detachment under the command of Thomas Cloney attacked the gunboats on the river Barrow at Fisherstown." Slieve Coillte was picked because of the excellent view of the other camps in Wexford such as Lacken Hill, Carrigbyrne Hill, Forth Mountain and Oulart Hill. It is about 4.8 kilometres (3.0 mi) from Scoil Mhuire and you can see several counties from its summit such as Waterford, Carlow, Kilkenny and Tipperary.

== Mythology ==
Slieve Coillte is alleged to play a role in Irish mythology. The hill outside New Ross is Ireland's Mount Ararat where the first invasion of Ireland took place in 2242 B.C. when Cessair the granddaughter of Noah, escaping the flood, made the first incursion or invasion into Ireland.
