= Bridgetown (disambiguation) =

Bridgetown is the capital city of Barbados.

Bridgetown may also refer to:

== Associated with Barbados ==
- City of Bridgetown (Barbados Parliament constituency), an electoral constituency for the Barbadian House of Assembly.
- Mayor of Bridgetown, a historical political office of Bridgetown.
- Bridgetown-Grantley Adams Int'l Airport is an airport serving Bridgetown, Barbados (Located in the parish of Christ Church).
- Port of Bridgetown, located in the purpose-built Deep Water Harbour, found along Cheapside, Bridgetown.
- Bridgetown Heliport, a shuttered heliport in Bridgetown on the coast of the Constitution River.

== Antigua and Barbuda ==
- Bridgetown, Antigua and Barbuda

== Australia ==
- Bridgetown, Western Australia
  - Shire of Bridgetown, a former local government area
  - Shire of Bridgetown-Greenbushes, a local government area

== Canada ==
- Bridgetown, Nova Scotia, a town on the Annapolis River

== Ireland ==
- Bridgetown, County Clare, a village
- Bridgetown, County Cork, a townland; see List of townlands of the barony of Imokilly
- Bridgetown, County Wexford, a village
  - Bridgetown Vocational College, in the County Wexford town

== Saint Vincent and the Grenadines ==
- Bridgetown, Saint Vincent and the Grenadines, a town in Saint Vincent and the Grenadines

== South Africa ==
- Bridgetown, an area of Athlone, Cape Town

== United Kingdom ==
- Bridgetown, Devon, possibly the original Bridgetown, in England, also considered a part of Totnes
- Bridgetown, Somerset, on the north Devon border
- Bridgetown, County Tyrone, a townland of County Tyrone, Northern Ireland
- Bridgetown, Glasgow, an area of south east Glasgow, in Scotland, also with claims to be the original Bridgetown for several towns founded in ex-British colonies

== United States ==
- Bridgetown, Ohio
- Bridgetown, a nickname of Portland, Oregon

== See also ==
- Bridgtown, a village in Staffordshire, England
- Bridgeton (disambiguation)
- Bridgetowne, a real estate development in Metro Manila, Philippines
