= Bridgetown, County Wexford =

Village in County Wexford, Ireland

Bridgetown Baile an Droichid
- Village
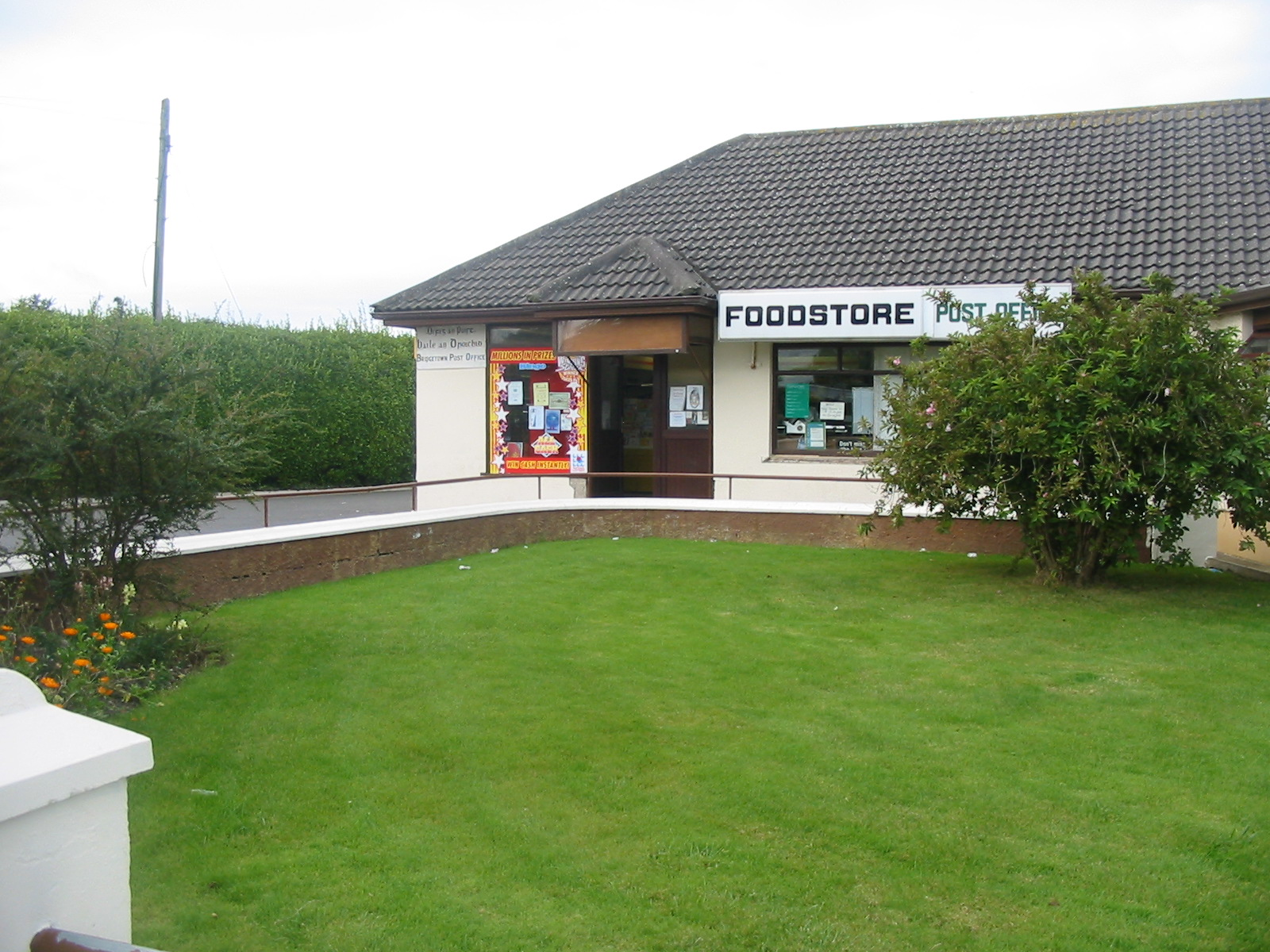
- Bridgetown Post Office

- Location in Ireland
- Coordinates: 52°14′44″N 6°32′56″W
- Country: Ireland
- Province: Leinster
- County: County Wexford

Population (2022)
  - Total: 544
- Time zone: UTC+0 (WET)
  - Summer (DST): UTC-1 (IST (WEST))

Bridgetown (Irish: Baile an Droichid) is a small rural village, located sixteen kilometres from Wexford town on the R736 regional road. It is close to Duncormick and six kilometres from the fishing village of Kilmore Quay. As of the 2022 census, the population of the village was 544.

== Education ==
The local co-educational secondary school, Bridgetown College, draws students from southeast County Wexford. Originally opened in the 1960s, an extension to the school was opened by then Minister for Education Mary O'Rourke in 1984, and a further modern extension was opened in 2008.

== Transport ==
=== Railway ===
Bridgetown railway station opened on 1 August 1906. The rail service consisted of a solitary train each way between Rosslare Europort and Waterford (Plunkett) with no service on Sundays. This railway service ceased after the last train in September 2010 but the line remains maintained.

=== Road ===
The rail service was replaced by a revised Bus Éireann route 370 service. Wexford Bus operate a shuttle bus that services Bridgetown, the Wexford town - Kilmore Quay route 390. Other bus services include a TFI Local Link service that operates to Wexford and Kilmore Quay.

Nearby villages include Ballycogley, Duncannon, Duncormick, Kilmore, Kilmore Quay, Murrintown, Taghmon, and Wellington Bridge.

== Industry and economy ==
The village of Bridgetown has a supermarket/filling station, garage, post office, bookshop, cafe, take-away, pubs, hair salons, a tailor, an upholster, an interior design business, a doctors' surgery, pharmacy, a fish monger, and a nearby apple farm. There are also two play school/creche facilities.

An eighteen turbine wind farm, capable of producing 27MW and powering approximately 17,000 homes, was commissioned in Richfield, near Bridgetown in December 2006.

== Festival ==
An arts, literature music and crafts festival, the Kathleen Browne Arts & Literary Festival, was held in Bridgetown in September 2018 and September 2019. The festival is named in honour of Kathleen Browne, a former senator who was born in Bridgetown in 1876.

== Developments ==
The population of Bridgetown increased from 183 residents as of the 2002 census, to 462 people in the 2016 census. By 2022, its population had grown to 544.

While, as of the late 1990s, there was only one housing development in the village, owing to the proximity of Wexford town, the short commute to Waterford, and the corresponding increased in population, a number of new private housing developments have been built.

== See also ==
- List of towns and villages in Ireland
