= Bridgetown railway station =

Station in County Wexford, Ireland

Bridgetown Baile an Droichid
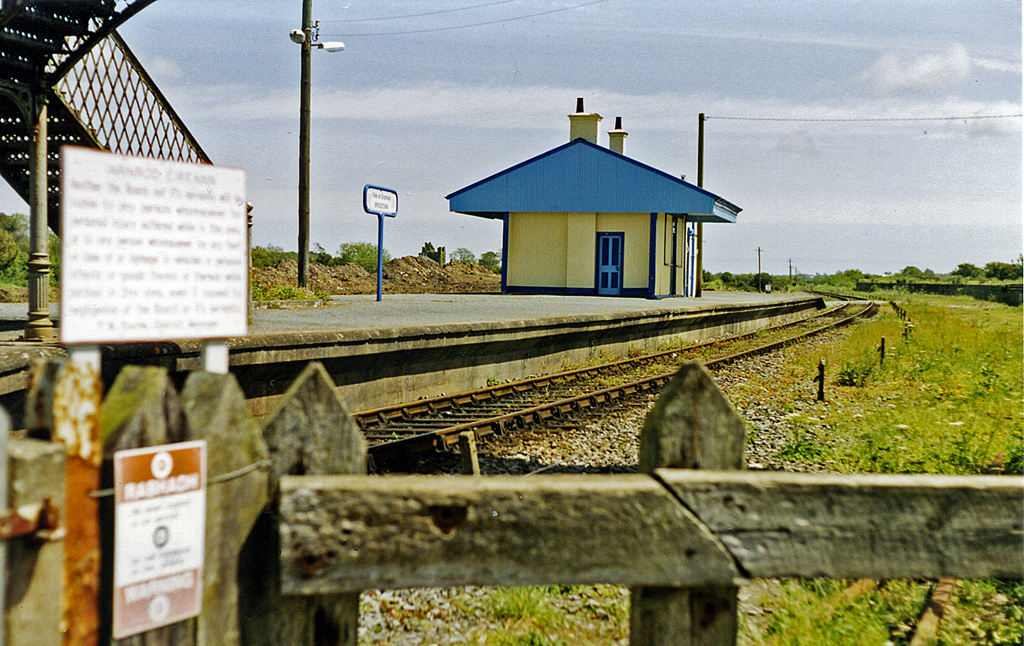
- Bridgetown station in 1993

General information
- Location: Bridgetown, Wexford, Ireland
- Coordinates: 52.23129°N 6.54901°W
- Owner: Iarnród Éireann
- Operator: Iarnród Éireann

Construction
- Structure type: At-grade

Key dates
- 1 August 1906: Station opens
- 3 November 1975: Station closes for goods traffic
- 18 September 2010: Station closes for passenger traffic
Location

Bridgetown railway station or Bridgetown halt (Irish: Baile an Droichid) served the village of Bridgetown, County Wexford, Ireland. It was unstaffed and accessible only via a picket gate.

== History ==
The station opened on 1 August 1906 and closed on 18 September 2010. The rail service was replaced by a revised Bus Éireann route 370 from Monday 20 September 2010: Wexford Bus operate a shuttle bus service to Wexford and Kilmore Quay three times a day (two on Wednesday and no Sunday service). A fourth service between Kilmore Quay and the town in each direction avoids the village. Infrequent Bus Éireann route 381 (Blackhall-Wexford) and 383 (Kilmore Quay-Wexford) also serve Bridgetown.

== Routes ==
| Preceding station | Disused railways | Following station |
|---|---|---|
| Wellingtonbridge; Line and station closed | InterCity; Limerick-Rosslare Line | Rosslare Strand |
| Duncormick; Line and station closed | Great Southern and Western Railway; Limerick-Rosslare | Killinick; Line and station closed |

== See also ==
- List of railway stations in Ireland
