= Ambrosetown =

Civil parish and townland in County Wexford, Ireland

Ambrosetown Baile Ambróis
- Civil parish
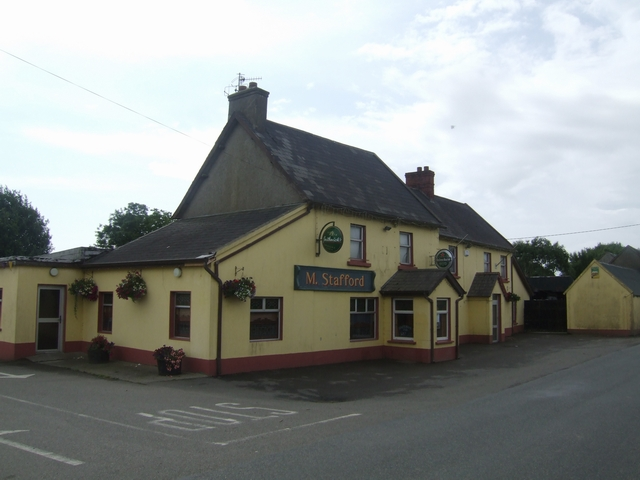
- Stafford's Pub in Ambrosetown
- Interactive map of Ambrosetown
- Location in Ireland
- Coordinates: 52.251°N 6.667°W
- Country: Ireland
- Province: Leinster
- County: County Wexford
- Time zone: UTC+0 (WET)
  - Summer (DST): UTC-1 (IST (WEST))

Ambrosetown (Irish: Baile Ambróis) is a civil parish and townland in County Wexford in the south of Ireland. Ambrosetown townland, which has an area of approximately 1.12 square kilometres (0.43 sq mi), had a population of 37 people as of the 2011 census. On 26 August 1940, several bombs were dropped in the area by two German Luftwaffe aircraft.

== History ==
=== Built heritage ===
The Record of Monuments and Places lists ringfort and holy well sites within Ambrosetown townland. The holy well, known as St Ambrose's Well, shares its name with the parish. The ruins of a former parish church at Ambrosetown lie within a enclosed graveyard. The first clerk of the General Post Office, Ambrose Leet, recorded Taghmon as Ambrosetown's post town in A Directory to the Market towns, Villages, Gentlemen's Seats and other noted places in Ireland from 1814. A 2023 South East Radio article reported that as part of an investment funding package for County Wexford's regional and local roads, €610,000 was being allocated to improve 17 bridges in County Wexford, including a bridge called Ambrosetown Bridge.

A brick railway viaduct, in the nearby townland of Johnstown, was constructed c. 1904. It carried a line originally operated by the Fishguard and Rosslare Railways and Harbours Company.

=== WWII bombing ===
During World War II, in which Ireland remained officially neutral, two German Luftwaffe aircraft dropped several bombs in the area. The Ambrosetown bombing, which took place during daylight hours on 26 August 1940, involved a single aircraft which dropped bombs near the railway viaduct and a local home. A second aircraft dropped bombs on the Shelbourne Co-Operative Creamery in nearby Campile, killing three people.

== Townlands ==
The civil parish of Ambrosetown contains 12 townlands, including the townland of the same name.

Townland	Irish name	Population	Acres	Coordinates
Ambrosetown	Baile Ambróis	37	277	52°14′58″N 6°40′1″W
Gibletstown	Baile Gubail	16	110	52°15′9″N 6°40′47″W
Moortown Little	Baile na Móna Beag	27	110	52°16′34″N 6°39′6″W
Moortown Great	Baile na Móna Mór	27	291	52°16′19″N 6°39′38″W
Maxboley	Buaile Macs	15	188	52°15′32″N 6°40′44″W
Holmanhill	Cnoc an Chuilinn	36	67	52°15′22″N 6°39′42″W
Knockbine	Cnoc Baoithín	55	206	52°16′5″N 6°40′55″W
Commons	An Coimín	0	4	52°15′25″N 6°40′26″W
Walshgraigue	Gráig Bhreatnach	10	87	52°15′55″N 6°39′56″W
Woodgraigue	Gráig na Coille	21	189	52°15′39″N 6°39′30″W
Halseyrath	Ráth an Choill	40	132	52°15′38″N 6°40′17″W
Tullycanna	Tulaigh Uí Chionaoith	73	386	52°16′32″N 6°40′28″W

== Demographics ==
Population of Ambrosetown civil parish at censuses
Year	1841	1851	1861	1871	1881	1891	1901	1911	(Note: Data for some censuses was never published at civil parish level.)
Population	137	126	101	96	115	92	86	40	—N/a
References									
