= Ballycullane railway station =

Railroad station in Ireland

Ballycullane Baile Uí Choileáin
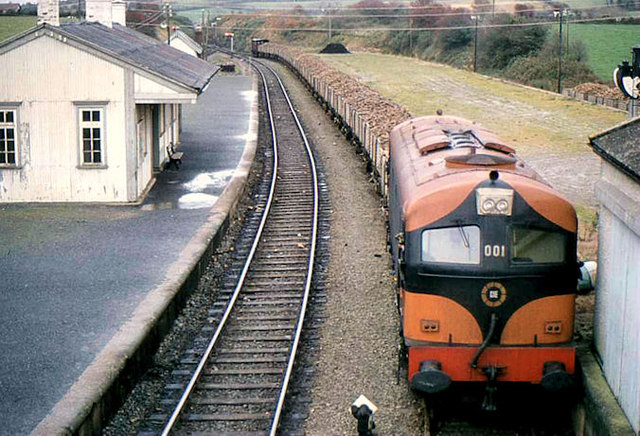
- CIÉ locomotive 001 leads the Wellingtonbridge – Campile beet transfer past Ballycullane in 1982

General information
- Location: Ballycullane; Ireland
- Coordinates: 52.2833°N 6.8384°W
- Owner: Iarnród Éireann
- Operator: Iarnród Éireann
- Platforms: 1

Construction
- Structure type: At-grade

Key dates
- 1 August 1906: Station opens
- 3 November 1975: Station closes for goods traffic
- 18 September 2010: Station closes for passenger traffic
Location

Ballycullane halt served the village of Ballycullane in County Wexford, Ireland. It was an unstaffed halt and had a single platform which was accessible by a ramp.

The station opened on 1 August 1906, and closed on 18 September 2010. Ballycullane was served on Tuesdays-only by Bus Éireann route 373 but this service was cut in May 2026.

Preceding station	Disused railways	Following station
Campile; Line and station closed	InterCity; Limerick-Rosslare Line	Wellington Bridge; Line and station closed
Campile; Line and station closed	Great Southern and Western Railway; Limerick-Rosslare	Wellington Bridge; Line and station closed

== See also ==
- List of railway stations in Ireland
