= Bridgton =

Bridgton can refer to a place in the United States:

- Bridgton, Maine, a town
  - Bridgton (CDP), Maine, the town center

== See also ==
- Bridgeton (disambiguation)
