= Saltmills =

Saltmills Muileann an tSáile
- Village
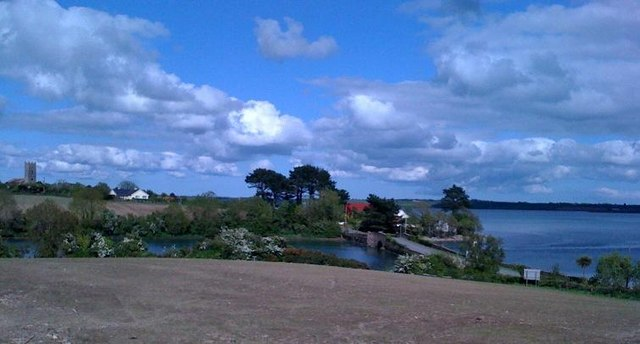
- A bridge connects Saltmills village to Tintern parish

- Location in Ireland
- Coordinates: 52°13′36″N 6°49′56″W
- Country: Ireland
- Province: Leinster
- County: Wexford
- Established: 1814
- Time zone: UTC+0 (WET)
  - Summer (DST): UTC-1 (IST (WEST))
- Area code: 051

Saltmills (Irish: Muileann an tSáile) is a small village located in the south-west of County Wexford, in Ireland. The village is located at the head of a small inlet that enters Bannow Bay. The village received its name from the medieval mills that existed just outside the village.

== Amenities ==
The village contains a pub, and also located here is the Colclough Memorial Hall, which is used for community activities, including card playing among the village's older residents. It is named after the Colclough family who once lived at nearby Tintern Abbey. The Colcloughs first arrived at the former Abbey in the 16th century and left in 1959. Saltmills itself was established in 1814 by Caesar Colclough to replace the old village at Tintern Abbey which was then demolished.

== Transport ==
Bus Éireann route 373 provides a service to Wexford, New Ross and Wellingtonbridge on Tuesdays. The village is also served on certain days by Wexford Local Link.

== See also ==
- Gurtins
- List of towns and villages in Ireland
