= Campile railway station =

Disused station in County Wexford, Ireland

Coordinates: 52.2833°N 6.9333°W

Campile Ceann Poill
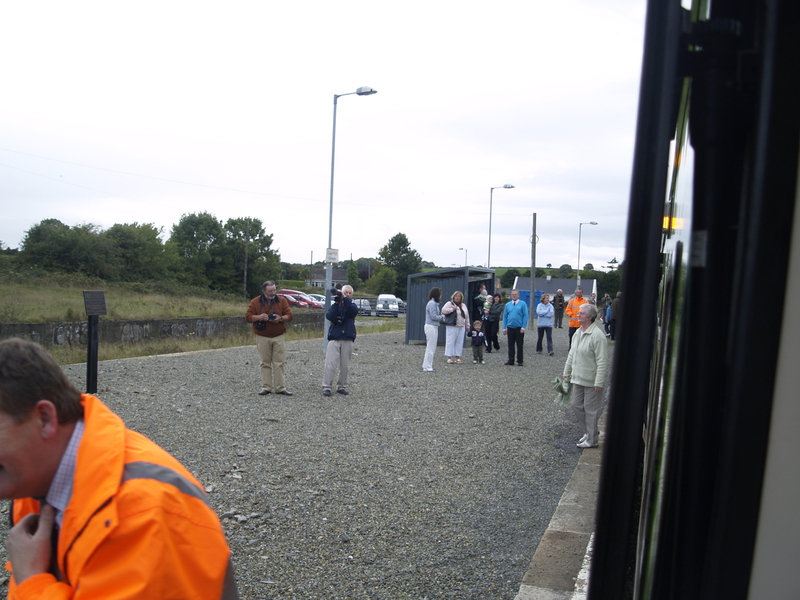

General information
- Location: Campile; Ireland
- Owner: Iarnród Éireann
- Operator: Iarnród Éireann
- Platforms: 1

Construction
- Structure type: At-grade

Key dates
- 1 August 1906: Station opens
- 11 March 1975: Station closes for goods traffic
- 18 September 2010: Station closes for passenger traffic
Location

Campile railway station served the village of Campile in County Wexford, Ireland.

The station opened on 1 August 1906 and closed on 18 September 2010. The rail service was replaced by a revised Bus Éireann route 370 from Monday 20 September 2010:

== Routes ==
Preceding station	Disused railways	Following station
Waterford Plunkett	InterCity; Limerick-Rosslare Line	Ballycullane; Line and station closed
Waterford North	Great Southern and Western Railway; Limerick-Rosslare	Ballycullane; Line and station closed

== See also ==
- List of railway stations in Ireland
