= Bridgeton =

Bridgeton may refer to:

== Scotland ==
- Bridgeton, Glasgow

== South Africa ==
- Bridgeton, Western Cape

== United States ==
- Bridgeton, Indiana
- Bridgeton Township, Michigan
- Bridgeton, Missouri
- Bridgeton, North Carolina
- Bridgeton, New Jersey
- Bridgeton, Portland, Oregon, a neighborhood in Portland, Oregon
- Bridgeton Township, Pennsylvania

== See also ==
- Bridgton (disambiguation)
- Bridgetown (disambiguation)
- MV Bridgeton
- Bridgerton (TV show)
