= Killinick railway station =

Closed station in County Wexford, Ireland

Killinick Cill Fhionnóg

General information
- Location: Killinick, County Wexford; Ireland
- Coordinates: 52.261744°N 6.458049°W
- Elevation: 17 ft (5.2 m)

History
- Original company: Fishguard and Rosslare Railways and Harbours
- Pre-grouping: Great Southern and Western Railway
- Post-grouping: Great Southern Railways

Key dates
- 1 August 1906: Station opens
- 3 November 1975: Station closes for goods traffic
- 6 September 1976: Station closes to passengers
- 1979: Excursions cease
Location

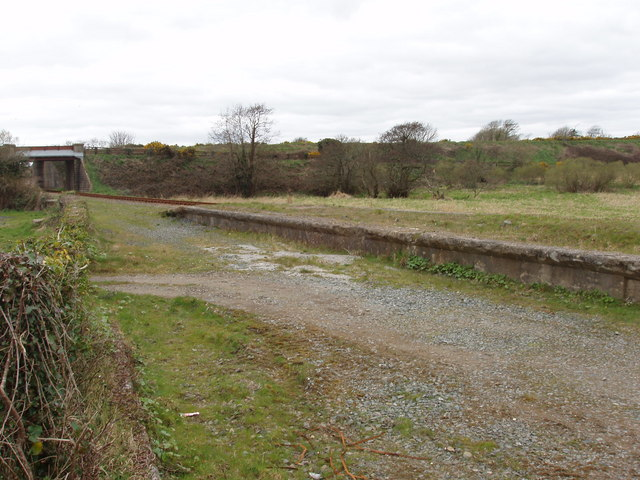
Former Killinick Station on the closed railway line from Rosslare to Waterford.

Killinick railway station served the village of Killinick and the surrounding areas in County Wexford, Ireland.

The station opened on 30 August 1906 as Orristown Junction. It was renamed to Assally Junction and finally to Killinick. The station closed in 1976. Excursions had stopped by 1979.

Local Link route 387 serves Killinick village several times a day each way linking it to Wexford, Rosslare Strand and Rosslare Europort. Wexford Bus also serve the village several times each weekday on their route between Wexford and Rosslare Strand. It is also served on Fridays-only by Bus Éireann route 378 (Churchtown to Wexford).

== Routes ==
Preceding station	Disused railways	Following station
Bridgetown	Great Southern and Western Railway; Limerick-Rosslare	Rosslare Strand
Bridgetown	Great Southern and Western Railway; Limerick-Wexford	Wexford South
