= Duncormick railway station =

Railway station in Ireland

Duncormick Dún Chormaic

General information
- Location: Duncormick, County Wexford; Ireland
- Coordinates: 52.242267°N 6.667782°W
- Elevation: 67 ft (20 m)

History
- Original company: Waterford, Limerick and Western Railway
- Pre-grouping: Great Southern and Western Railway
- Post-grouping: Great Southern Railways

Key dates
- 1 August 1906: Station opens
- 3 November 1975: Station closes for goods traffic
- 6 September 1976: Station closes to passengers
Location

Duncormick railway station was located about 1.5 miles from the village of Duncormick in County Wexford, Ireland.

The station opened on 1 August 1906, and closed on 6 September 1976, with goods traffic having stopped the winter before. Passenger trains continued to run past the site of the station until 18 September 2010 and the line is currently used on occasion for empty stock movements.

Bus Éireann route 381, from Wexford to Blackhall, serves Duncormick on Tuesdays-only.

== Routes ==
Preceding station	Disused railways	Following station
Wellington Bridge	Great Southern and Western Railway; Limerick-Rosslare	Bridgetown
