= Gurtins =

Townland in County Wexford, Ireland

Gurtins is a small townland between Saltmills and Stonehouse on the Hook Peninsula in County Wexford, Ireland.
