= Ballycullane =

Village in County Wexford, Ireland

Ballycullane Baile Uí Choileáin
- Village
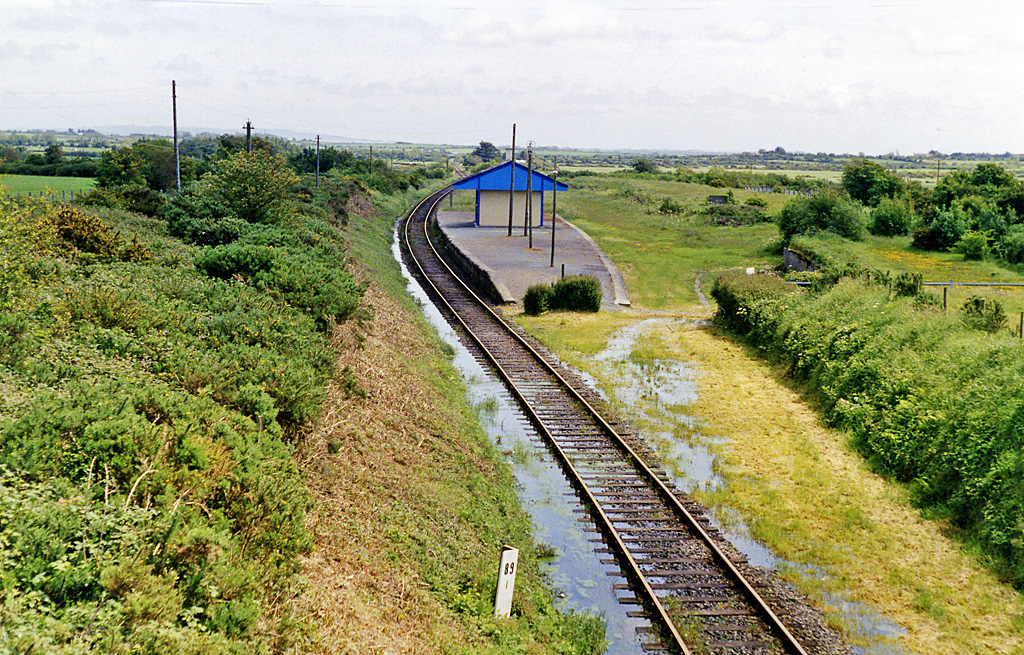
- Ballycullane's railway halt closed in 2010

- Location in Ireland
- Coordinates: 52°16′26″N 6°49′48″W
- Country: Ireland
- Province: Leinster
- County: Wexford
- Elevation: 46 m (151 ft)

Population (2016)
  - Total: 318
- Time zone: UTC+0 (WET)
  - Summer (DST): UTC-1 (IST (WEST))
- Area code: 051

Ballycullane (Irish: Baile Uí Choileáin) is a small village located in the south-west of County Wexford, in Ireland. As of the 2016 census, it had a population of 318 people.

== Transport ==
Ballycullane Railway Station opened on 1 August 1906. In its final years the rail service consisted of a solitary train in each direction between Rosslare Europort and Waterford. The rail service ceased after the passage of the evening train on Saturday 18 September 2010. Bus Éireann route 373 served Ballycullane on Tuesdays only but this service was cut in May 2026.

== Amenities ==
Today, the village contains a shop, pub, national (primary) school, and a Garda station.

The village also contains a Roman Catholic church and an adjoining cemetery. This church was built in 1840, and was extensively renovated in 1970, giving it a more modern appearance. Ballycullane is part of the parish of Tintern.

== See also ==
- List of towns and villages in Ireland
