= Lacken, County Wexford =

Townland in Ireland

Coordinates: 52.399°N 6.885°W

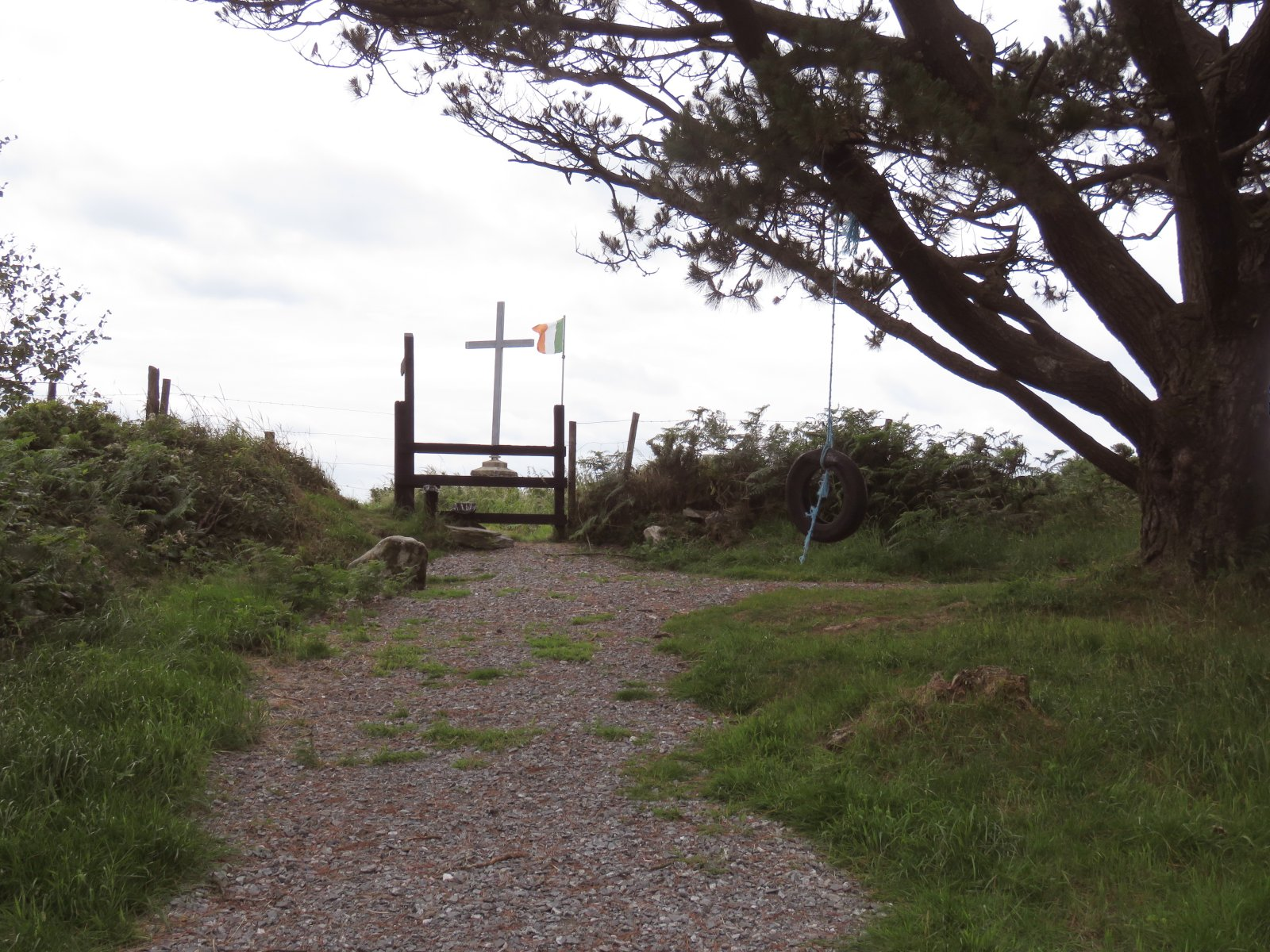
Monument on Lacken Hill commemorating the 1798 Rebellion

Lacken (Irish: Leacán) is a townland about two miles outside the town of New Ross in County Wexford, Ireland. It is located in the civil parish of Oldross and the electoral division of Whitemoor. Central to the area is Lacken Hill, a hill planted with a mix of coniferous and deciduous trees which has a public walk-way up through the wood. The area is used by walkers and cyclists and there are numerous paths and tracks in the wood.

== Location ==
Lacken is located in the Catholic parish of Cushinstown in the Roman Catholic Diocese of Ferns. The closest urban centre to Lacken is New Ross, which is approximately two miles away. As the 2011 census, there were 166 people living in Lacken townland.

== History ==
During the Irish Rebellion of 1798, rebels were in complete control of County Wexford for the three weeks between 30 May and 21 June. These leaders were a mixture of Catholic and Anglican farmers, merchants and professional men, but also included several Catholic priests, most of whom appear to have been renegades in the eyes of their bishop even before joining the rebels. The military effort was conducted with the help of an informal conscription of able-bodied men and order was preserved in towns by volunteer tradesmen and in the countryside by small crossroads guarding parties. Lacken Hill was used as a camp for the rebels in the aftermath of one of the most bloody battles of the entire rebellion, the Battle of New Ross. It is estimated that perhaps as many as two thousand rebels were killed. The rebels camped on Lacken Hill from 11 June. Their numbers dwindled greatly during this time down to approximately 400 by 19 June, when Father Philip Roche led the remaining able-bodied insurgents in a retreat to the Three Rocks near Wexford town to avoid British troops. Today there is a Holy Cross and commemorative stone at the top of the hill, with a plaque commemorating the actions of the rebels who fought in the uprising, died on Lacken Hill and were buried in unmarked graves there.

== Forest of the Dunbrody ==
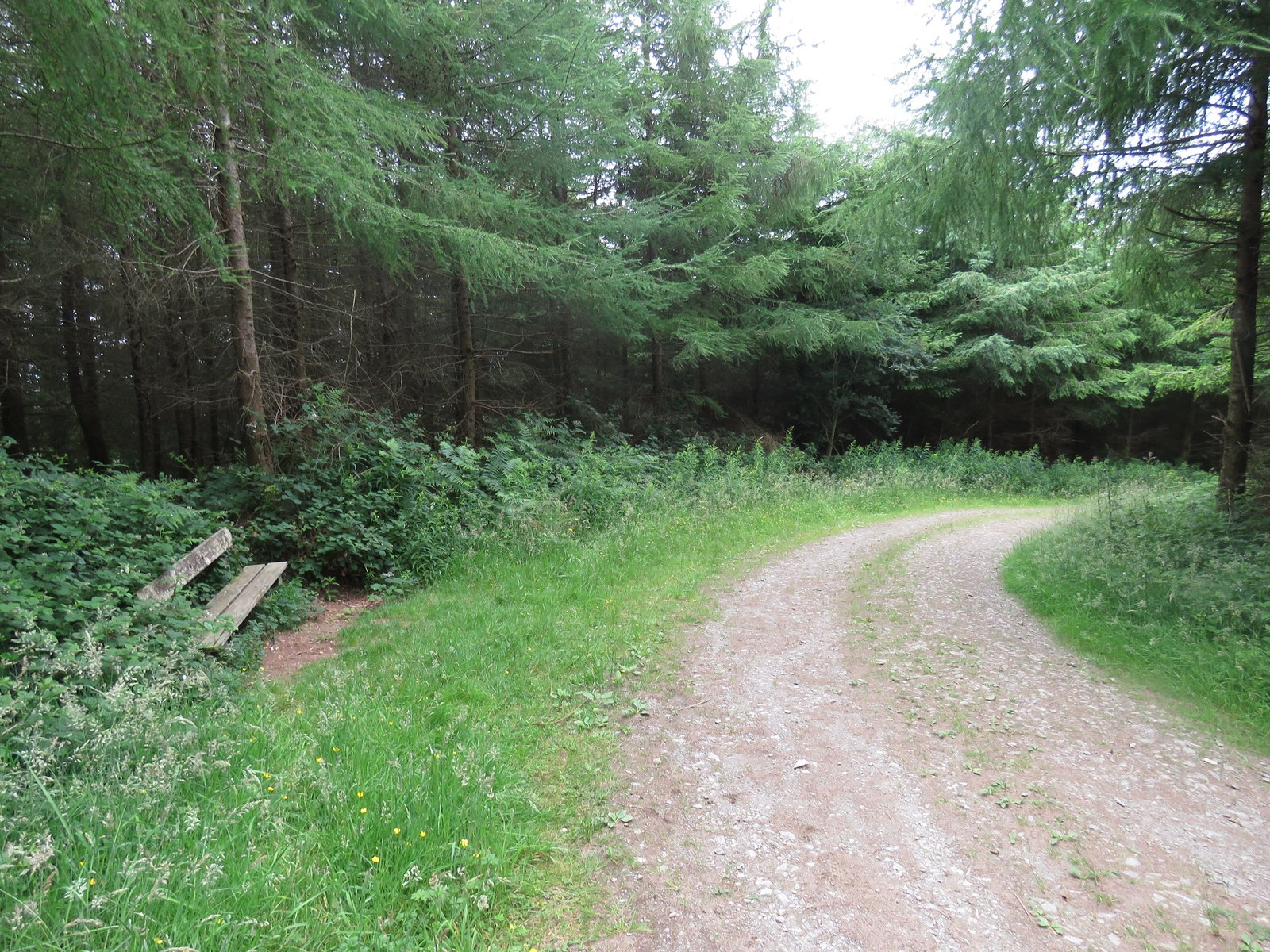
Track in the "Forest of the Dunbrody"

Coillte, Ireland's state forestry body, planted 25,000 trees of the species used to build the Dunbrody Replica Famine Ship on Lacken Hill. Individuals could sponsor the planting of such trees. The forest on Lacken Hill is quite individual due to its mixture of deciduous and coniferous trees and is rich in native flora and fauna. There is a walkway through the forest, taking in the historic Lacken Hill summit, and linking the Forest of the Dunbrody with the Dunbrody Famine Ship in nearby New Ross town.
