= Wellingtonbridge railway station =

Station in County Wexford, Ireland

Coordinates: 52.2669°N 6.7461°W

Wellingtonbridge Droichead Eoin
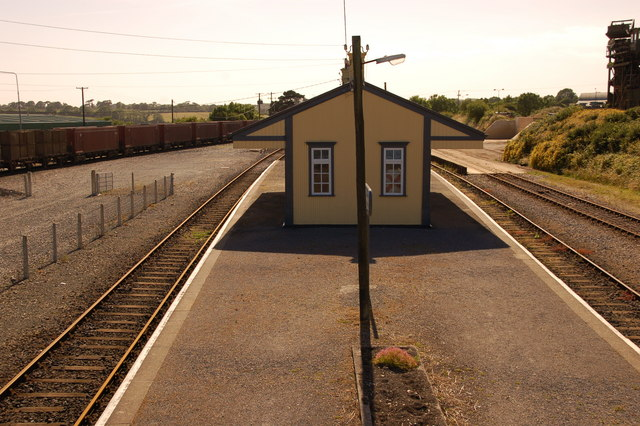
- Wellingtonbridge station in 2006

General information
- Location: Wellingtonbridge; Ireland
- Owner: Iarnród Éireann
- Operator: Iarnród Éireann
- Platforms: 2

Construction
- Structure type: At-grade

Key dates
- 1 August 1906: Station opens
- 3 November 1975: Station closes for goods traffic (except tar and sugar beet)
- 2 June 1978: Station closes for tar traffic
- 18 September 2010: Station closes for passenger traffic
Location
- Location within Ireland

Wellingtonbridge railway station served the town of Wellingtonbridge and nearby Maudlintown in County Wexford, Ireland.

== Description ==
The station was staffed and had an island platform; it was not wheelchair-accessible. It had the only passing loop on the mothballed Waterford-Rosslare section of the Limerick–Rosslare railway line. The station was used for loading of sugar beet trains until the last sugar factory (at Mallow) closed after the 2005 season.

The station opened on 1 August 1906 and closed on 18 September 2010.

== Replacement bus service ==
The rail service was replaced by a revised Bus Éireann route 370 from Monday 20 September 2010. Once a week Bus Éireann routes 372 (New Ross-Foulkesmill-Wexford) and 373 (New Ross-Fethard-on-Sea-Wexford) also serve Wellingtonbridge.

== See also ==
- List of railway stations in Ireland

Preceding station	Disused railways	Following station
Ballycullane; Line and station closed	InterCity; Limerick-Rosslare Line	Bridgetown; Line and station closed
Ballycullane; Line and station closed	Great Southern and Western Railway; Limerick-Rosslare	Duncormick; Line and station closed
