= Oldross =

Civil parish in County Wexford, Ireland

Oldross (Irish: Seanros, meaning 'old Ross or wood') is a large civil parish in the barony of Bantry in County Wexford, Ireland. It contains the Ecclesiastical parish of Cushinstown in the Roman Catholic Diocese of Ferns. The three churches in the latter parish are situated at Rathgarogue, Cushinstown and Terrerath, cater for a population of approximately 2500. Villages in the parish include Ballywilliam, Cushinstown, Ballinaboola and Cassagh.

== Townlands ==
These are Ballylane West, Ballylane East, Ballymacar, Begerin (Lloyd), Begerin (Loftus), Bushpark, Camlin, Creacon Lower, Creacon Upper, Dunanore, Finnseoge, Heathpark, Kilclammon, Knockroe, Lacken, Millquarter, Moorfields, Mylerspark, Palace East, Palace West, Robinstown Great, Robinstown Little, Rochestown, Slaght, Springpark, Ballintober, Ballinvegga, Ballyanne, Ballynabanoge, Berkeley, Boherstooka, Bolacaheer, Coolback, Gobbinstown, Mounthanover, Rathgaroge, Scark, Carnagh, Cushinstown, Aclamon, Terrerath, Ballinaboola, Kilscanlon.

== Education ==
There are two primary schools in the parish. Cushinstown NS serves the Cushinstown and Terrerath areas while Rathgarogue NS serves people from the Rathgarogue area. Most people from the parish go to secondary school in the nearby town of New Ross as there is no secondary school in the parish.

== Sport ==
There are four main sports organisations in the parish. They include Rathgarogue-Cushinstown GAA Club, Ballyanne Racquetball Club, Terrerath Badminton Club and Cushinstown A.F.C. (soccer).

== See also ==
- List of civil parishes of Ireland
