= Bridgetown Vocational College =

School in Ireland

Bridgetown College
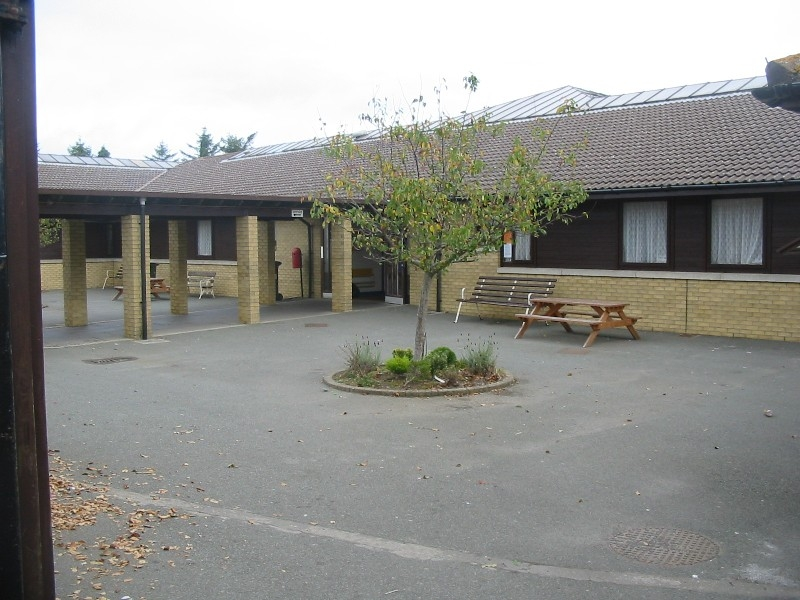
- Entrance courtyard at Bridgetown College

Location
- Bridgetown, County Wexford; Ireland
- Coordinates: 52.2288°N 6.5499°W

Information
- Principal: Adrian Power
- Teaching staff: c. 70 (2024)
- Enrolment: 604 (2024)
- Colours: Red, White
- Newspaper: The Bridge
- Website: www.bridgetowncollege.ie

Bridgetown College is a secondary school in Bridgetown, County Wexford, Ireland. It is a co-educational school managed by the Waterford and Wexford Education and Training Board.

== History ==
After the enactment of the Vocational Education Act in 1930, an experimental vocational school was established in rented accommodation in Bridgetown village. Enrolment slowly increased and it was not until the 1960s that the need for a proper post-primary school in the area was accepted, and in October 1965, 44 students and five teachers moved from the rented accommodation into a new purpose-built school.

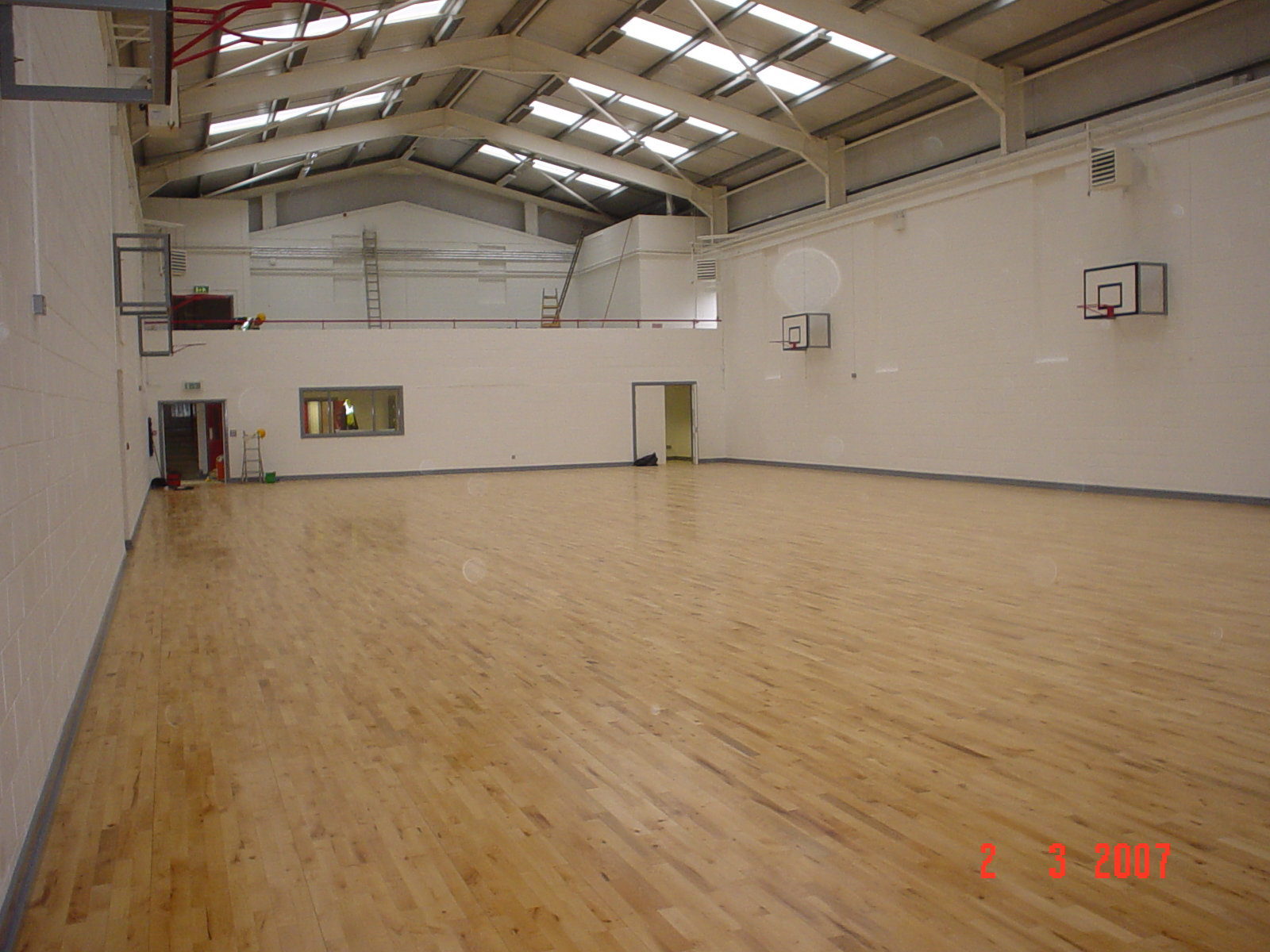
The gymnasium

The numbers continued to increase and by 1976, when students sat for the Leaving Certificate for the first time, enrolment stood at 329. To cope with the increasing numbers, a new building was officially opened by the Minister for Education Mary O'Rourke on 12 October 1984. By 2024, the school had 604 students.

In December 2003, Bridgetown College celebrated its 50th anniversary.

A building extension, completed in Summer 2007, had a floor area of 1,800 square metres (19,000 sq ft) and provided eight classrooms, a new art room, a science laboratory, a tiered demonstration room, a technology room, a senior engineering room, a general purpose and dining area, a new staff room, a new administration area and extra toilet and cloakroom facilities. An extension to the gymnasium was also completed in 2007.

== Courses ==
The school offers the Junior Certificate, Transition Year, Leaving Certificate, Leaving Certificate Applied, and the Leaving Certificate Vocational Programme.

== Alumni ==
- Greg McGrath (b. 1997) - rugby union player
- Diarmuid O'Keeffe - All-Star hurler
- Hazel O'Sullivan - Irish model
- Scott Doran - Wexford footballer
- Joey Wadding - Wexford footballer
