= Campile =

Village in County Wexford, Ireland

Campile Ceann Poill
- Village
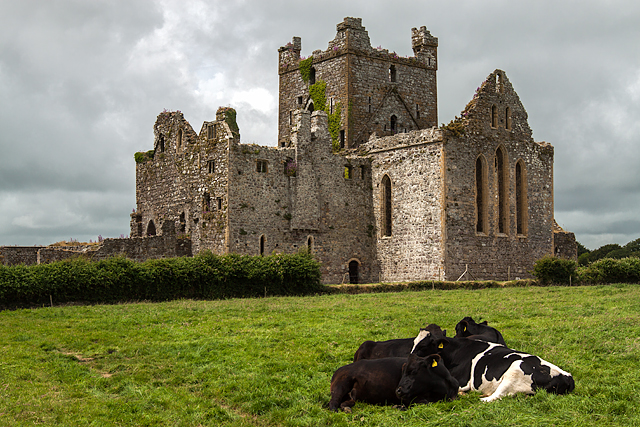
- Dunbrody Abbey lies 1 km west of Campile

- Location in Ireland
- Coordinates: 52°17′00″N 6°56′00″W
- Country: Ireland
- Province: Leinster
- County: County Wexford
- Elevation: 48 m (157 ft)

Population (2022)
  - Total: 371
- Time zone: UTC+0 (WET)
  - Summer (DST): UTC-1 (IST (WEST))
- Irish Grid Reference: S726155

Campile (Irish: Ceann Phoill or Ceann Poill, meaning 'head of the creek') is a small village situated in County Wexford in the south of Ireland. It is 14 kilometres (9 miles) south of the town of New Ross. As of the 2022 census, Campile had a population of 371 people.

== History ==
Archaeological evidence of ancient settlement in the area include several burnt mounds and ringforts in the neighbouring townlands of Ballyvelig, Tinnock, and Dunbrody. Approximately 1 km southwest of Campile is the 12th century Dunbrody Abbey, and the 17th century bawn of the (incomplete) Dunbrody Castle.

In 1798, during the United Irishmen Rebellion, a rebel camp was located on nearby Slieve Coillte hill.

=== WWII bombing ===
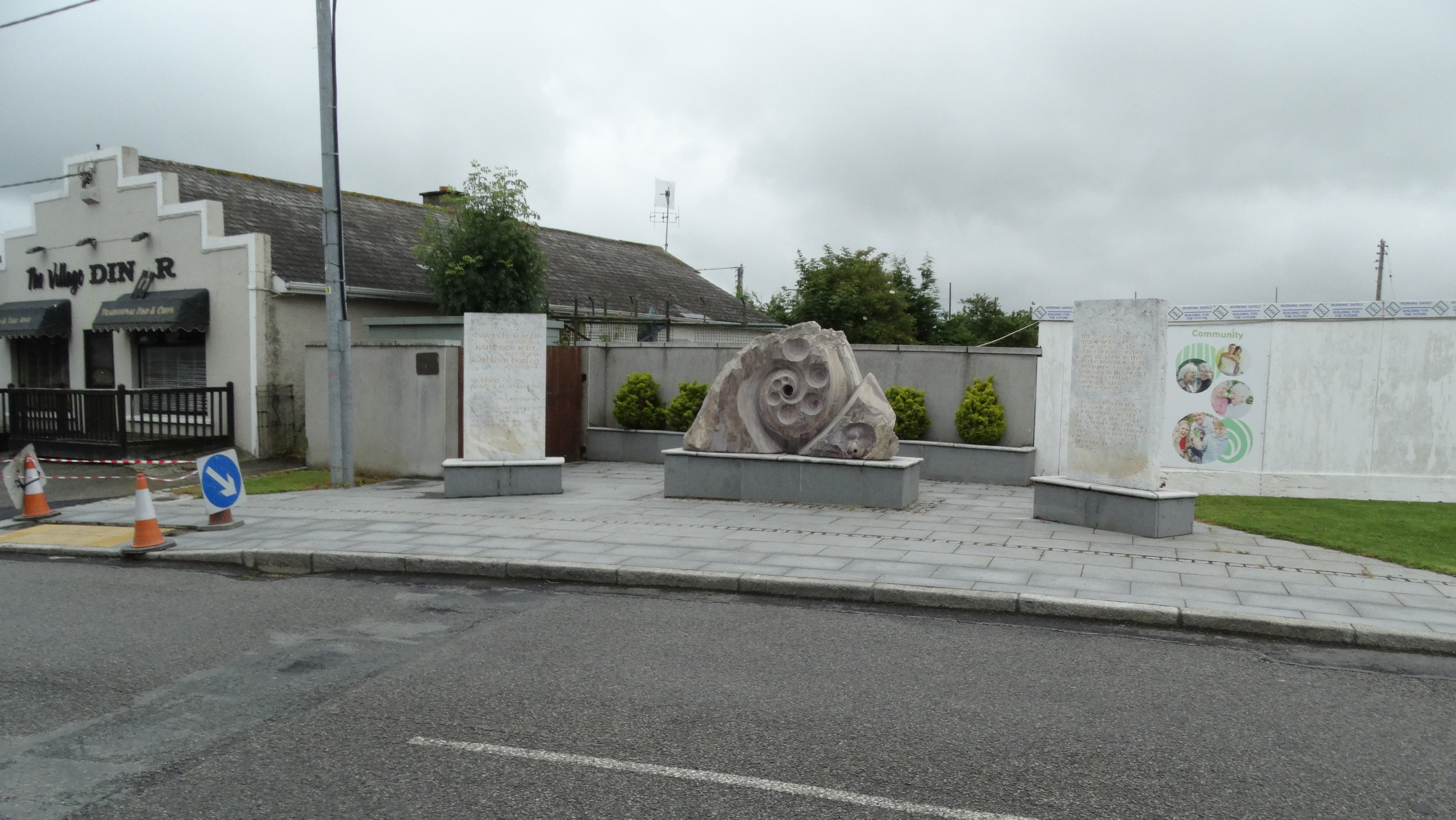
Memorial in Campile marking the bombing of the area during WW2

During World War II, in which Ireland remained officially neutral, the German Luftwaffe bombed Campile. The bombing took place on 26 August 1940. The bombs were dropped by a lone German bomber that appeared over Campile around lunch time. A second aircraft dropped a number of bombs at nearby Ambrosetown.

The first bomb dropped at Campile failed to detonate. Local man Teddy Drought, who was fifteen years old and worked in Shelburne Co-op at the time of the bombing, described witnessing the aircraft approach and the first bomb being dropped while sat on a wall with a friend. In an interview with RTÉ in 1990, Drought recalled the following scene:

"A bomb come down-we didn't know at the time it was a bomb-came down through the roof and down on the ground alongside the two of us (...) it busted, it didn't explode" [sic].

After dropping this first bomb, the plane circled the Campile area and dropped an additional three bombs over the Shelburne Co-op creamery and restaurant area. Approximately 150 employees worked at the Shelburne Co-op at the time of the bombing. Three women were killed during this daylight bombing – Mary Ellen Kent (30), her sister Catherine Kent (26), both from Terrerath, and Kathleen Hurley (27) from Garryduff. The bomb that exploded and killed the three women landed on the restaurant section of the Co-op where the women had been working. A total of four German bombs were dropped on the creamery and restaurant sections of Shelburne Co-op, and the railway line was also targeted. Greater loss of life was narrowly avoided due to approximately fifty employees leaving the restaurant after the lunch time rush shortly before the bomb was dropped.

The attack has never been fully explained, although some historians have suggested that it was a deliberate attack to discourage the supply of foodstuffs to wartime Britain. Despite this, a commonly given explanation for the bombing is that the German pilot had gotten lost and mistook Ireland's South-East for Wales.

Following the bombing, precautions were taken in an attempt to protect locals in the event of another attack. For example, sirens were installed in the village that would sound at the Shelburne Co-op any time a plane flew overhead for the duration of the war. In an interview with RTÉ reporter Michael Ryan in 1990, the area manager of Waterford Cooperative Tom Connery claimed that upon hearing these sirens locals would "lay awake at night wondering if it was them again".

On the occasion of the 70th anniversary of the bombing, a memorial garden was dedicated to the memory of the three women who died.

== Amenities ==
The village has two small supermarkets, a Centra store and a Londis store. There are also two smaller local shops. The Shelbourne Co-Op, which was hit during the Campile Bombing, was demolished in 2010. There is also a pharmacy, joinery, hardware store, filling station, take-away, soccer pitch, hair salon, community hall, and two pubs. The local churches are situated in Horeswood and Ballykelly, approximately a half-mile and four miles from Campile, respectively. The parish school is situated in Ballyfarnogue, adjacent to the Horeswood GAA complex, two miles from the village.

== Transport ==
=== Rail transport ===
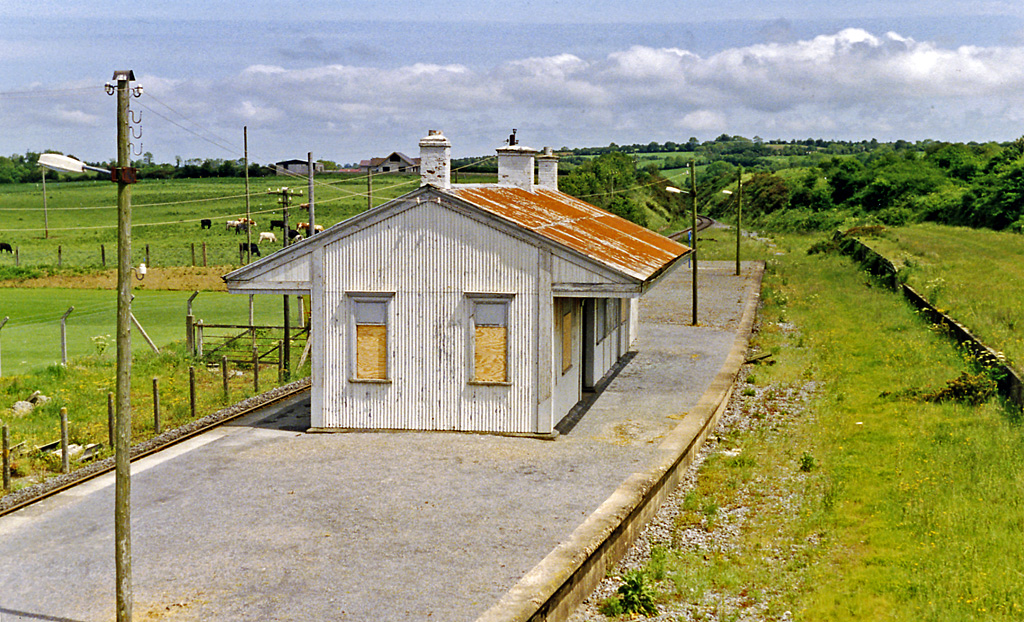
Campile railway station closed in 2010

Campile railway station opened on 1 August 1906. On 21 July 2010, Irish Rail announced that it would suspend its rail service through Campile, and this took effect after the operation of the evening train on 18 September 2010. Before that date, it was served Mondays to Saturdays by one passenger train in each direction.

=== Bus transport ===
Before the cessation of the rail service, Campile's Bus Éireann service was infrequent, consisting of the commuter route between Duncannon and Waterford city via New Ross, and on certain days by a cross-country bus to Wexford. After the rail service ceased, the bus service was enhanced significantly. A revised Bus Éireann route 370 service came into effect in September 2010. Campile is also served by a TFI Local Link service between Hook Head and New Ross.

== Sport ==
The local sports teams for Campile and the surrounding area are Campile United in soccer, who play in the Wexford soccer league, and Horeswood GAA who play in the Wexford Gaelic football and hurling leagues. Horeswood GAA has won the Wexford Senior Football Championship 4 times in 2005, 2006, 2009, and 2011.

== Education ==
Scoil Mhuire is situated in the townland of Ballinamona on the New Ross-Campile road. It is a central school for the parish of Sutton's, which is divided into Horeswood Parish and Ballykelly Parish. In 1979, four schools in the parish amalgamated into Scoil Mhuire. These four schools were Aclare NS, Ballykelly NS, Horeswood NS, and Killesk NS.
