= Kilmore Quay =

Village in County Wexford, Ireland

Kilmore Quay Irish: Cé na Cille Móire
- Village
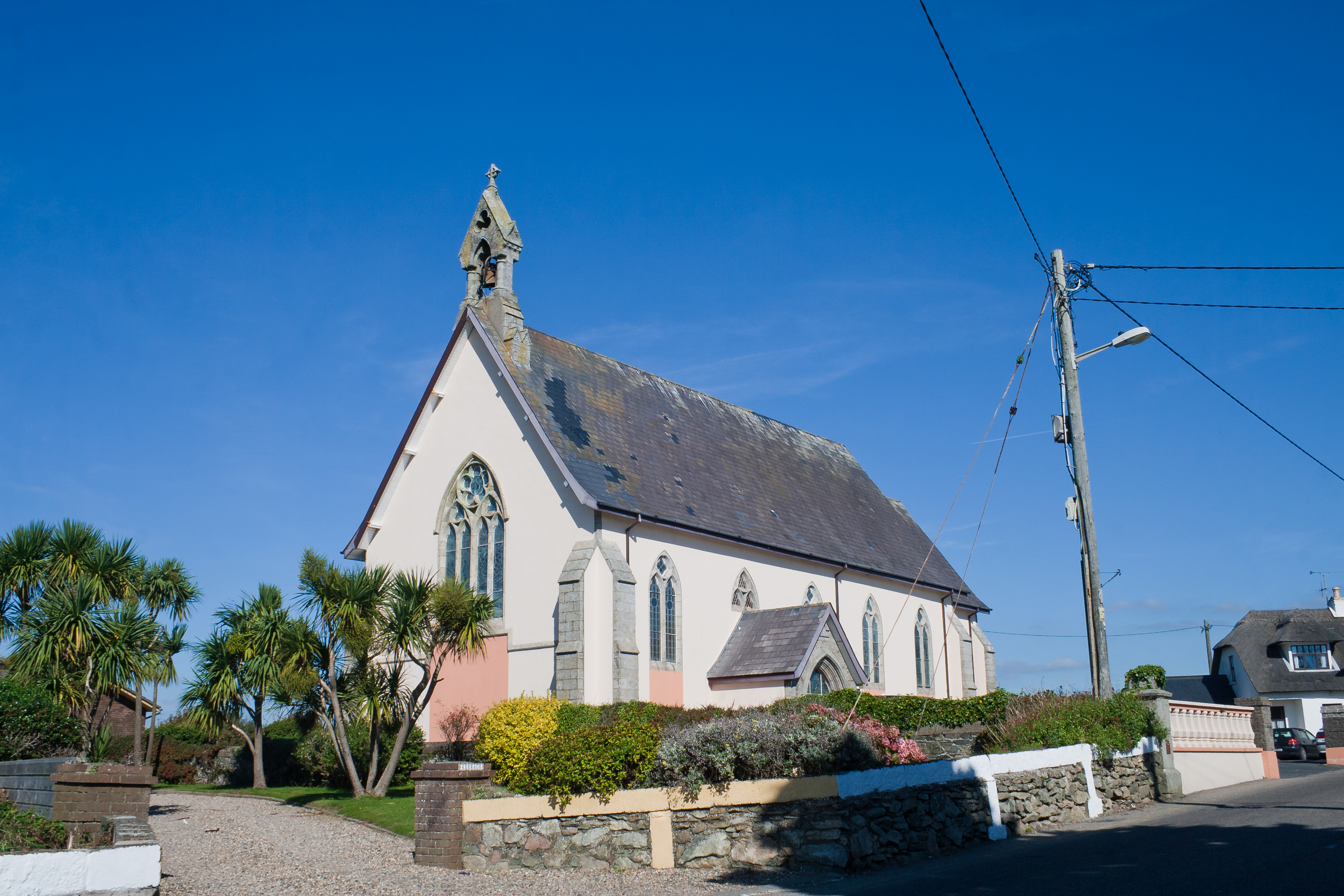
- St Peter's Church, Kilmore Quay

- Location in Ireland
- Coordinates: 52°10′33″N 6°35′11″W
- Country: Ireland
- County: County Wexford

Population (2016)
  - Total: 372

Kilmore Quay (Irish: Cé na Cille Móire, meaning 'Quay of the big church') is a fishing village near Kilmore, in County Wexford, Ireland. As of 2016, it has a population of 372. It is a fishing village, but its leisure facilities such as sailing, and sea angling charters are also of economic importance.

== Tourism ==
The village holds a seafood festival during the summer with seafood served every day, live music, and activities such as races and family events.

Architecturally notable buildings in the village include St Peter's Church, which was built in 1875 to a design attributed to architect George Ashlin.

Ballyteige Castle, a 15th-century tower house which was the ancestral home of the Anglo-Irish Whitty family, who lived there until the 1650s, is approximately 1 mile north of Kilmore Quay.

The Saltee Islands lie off the coast near Kilmore Quay, and boat trips to these islands are available from the village. The two islands, Great Saltee and Little Saltee, are known for being Ireland's largest bird sanctuary with gannets, gulls, puffins, cormorants, razorbills, and guillemots living on the islands.

== Public transport ==
Wexford Bus operates several services a day (not Sundays) between Wexford and Kilmore Quay via Johnstown Castle and Bridgetown.

== Marina ==
There is a boating marina located in the harbour. This serves as a jumping-off point for many Irish yachts embarking on journeys to France and beyond. It is also the first landing point for many visitors from Britain and continental Europe.

The Royal National Lifeboat Institution provided a lifeboat for Kilmore Quay in 1847. It was crewed by the local coastguard and kept in their boathouse but fell into disuse by 1857. A permanent Kilmore Quay Lifeboat Station was opened in 1884 and since 2004 the lifeboat has been moored in the marina.

== Gallery ==
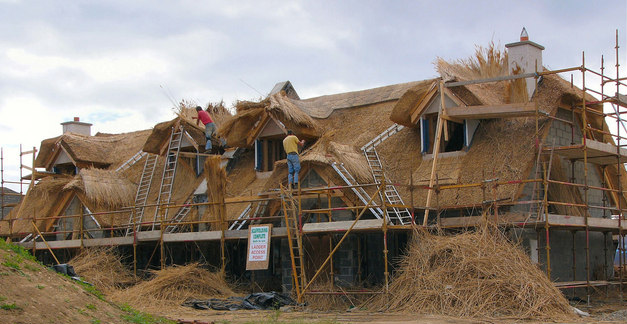
Thatching at Kilmore Quay

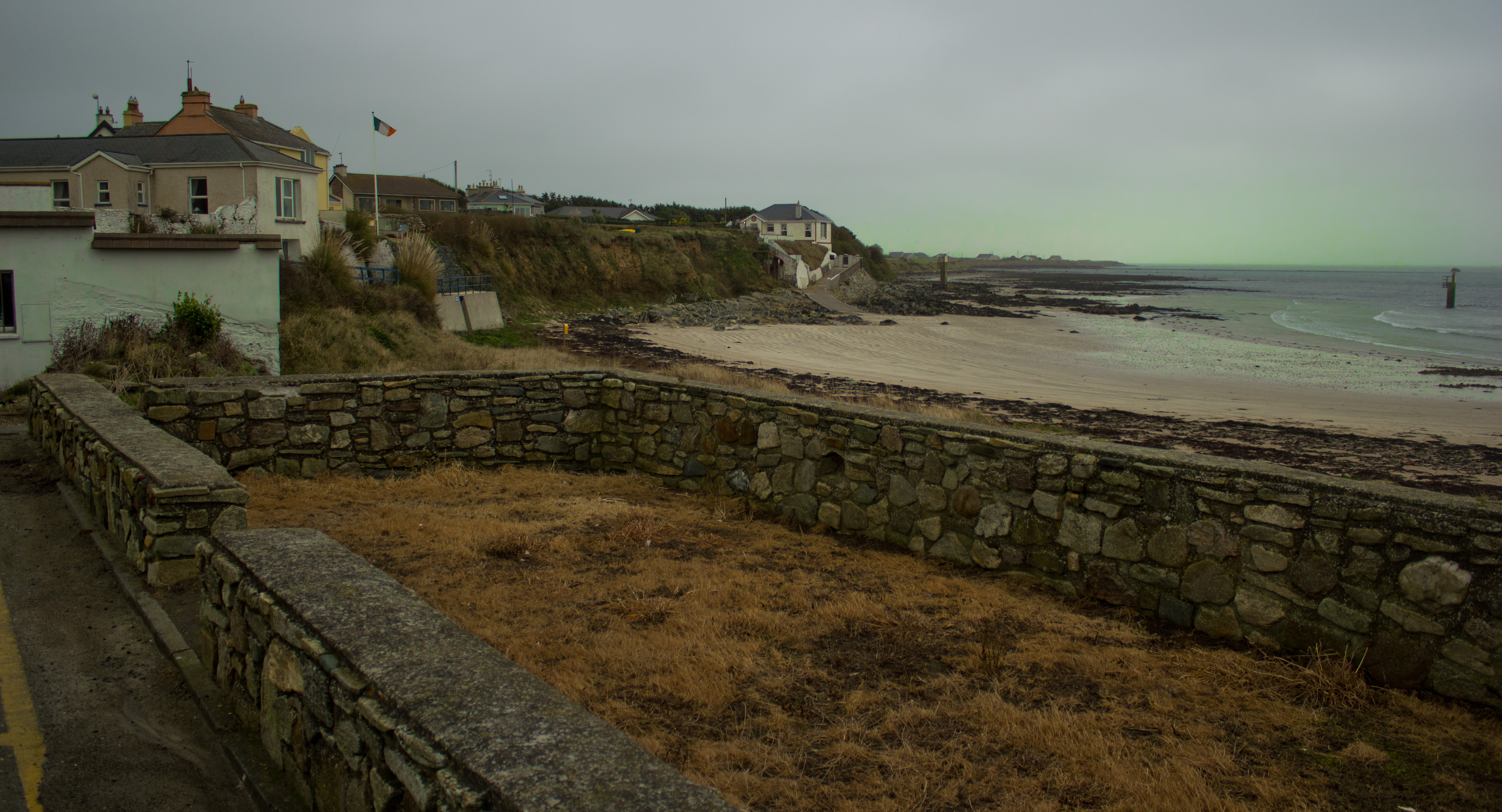
Waterfront

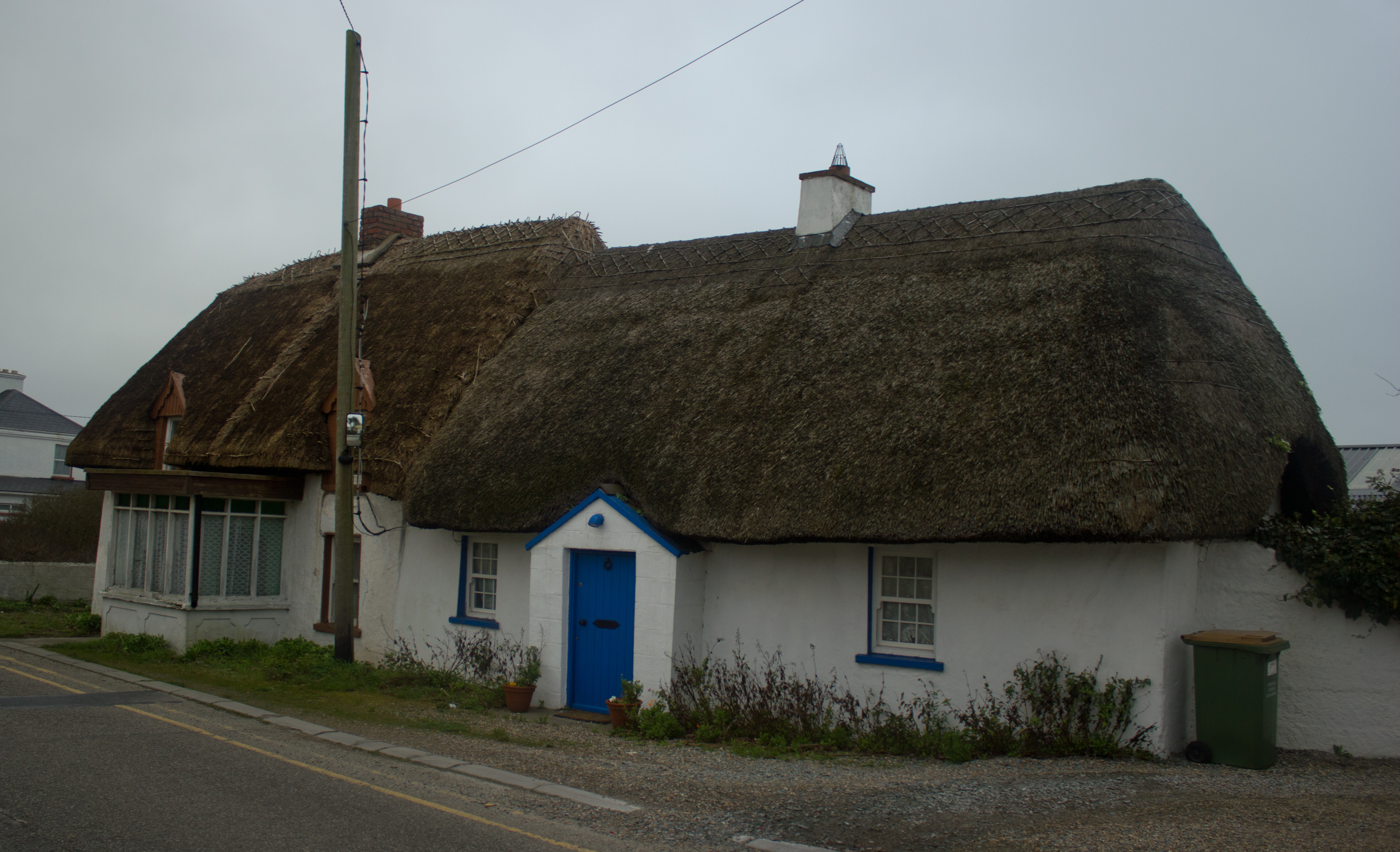
Thatched buildings

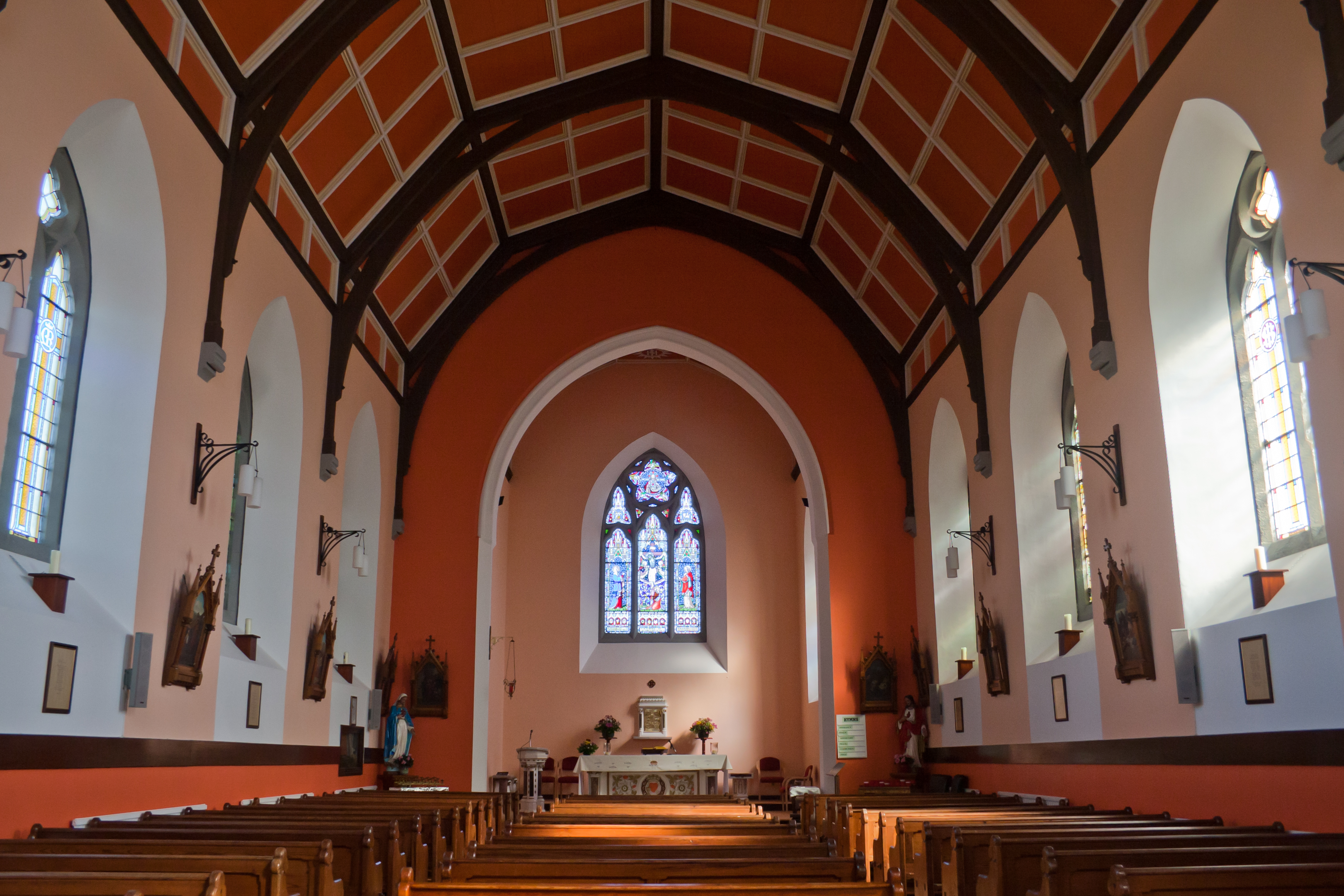
St Peter's Church interior

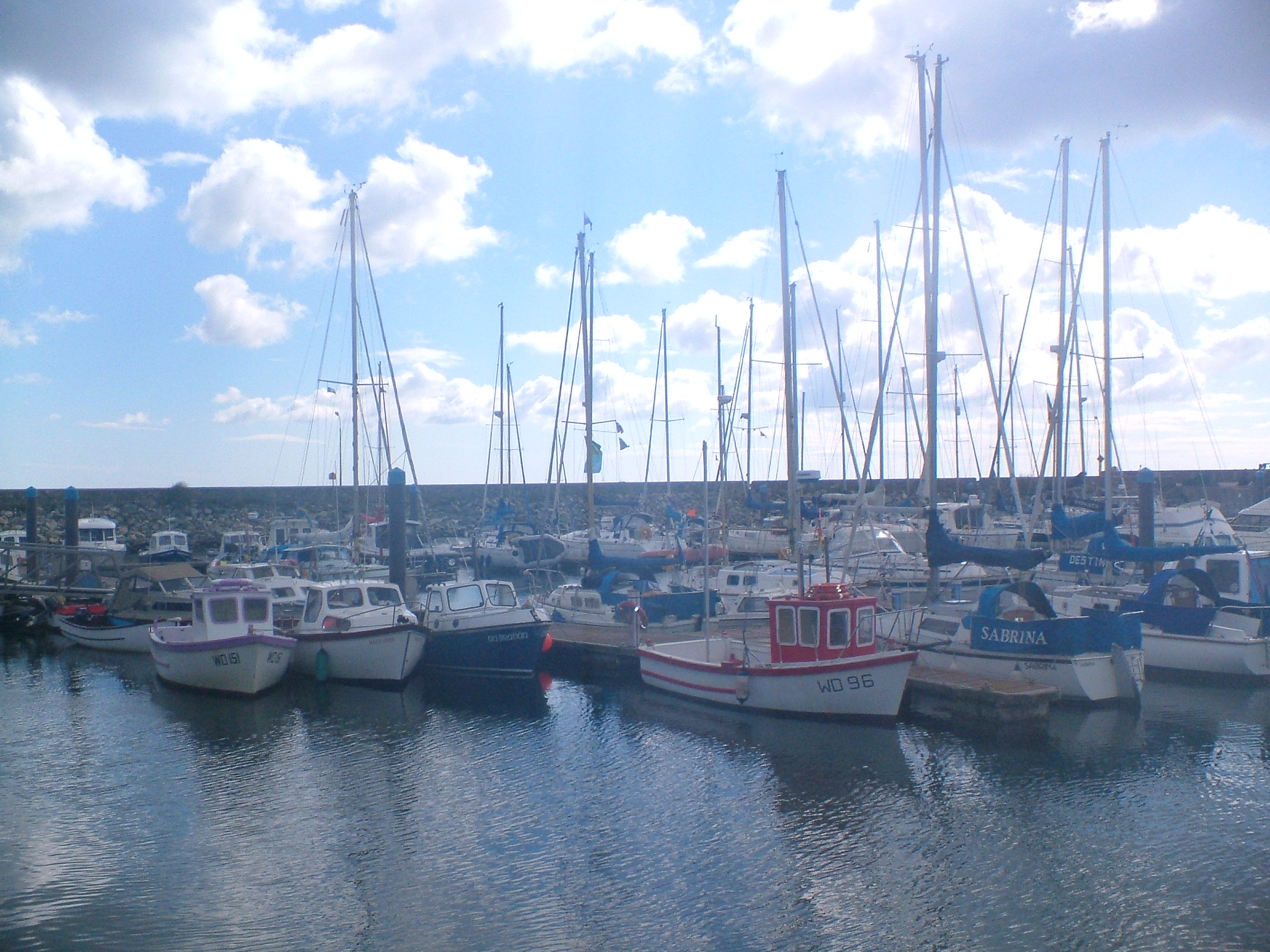
The marina

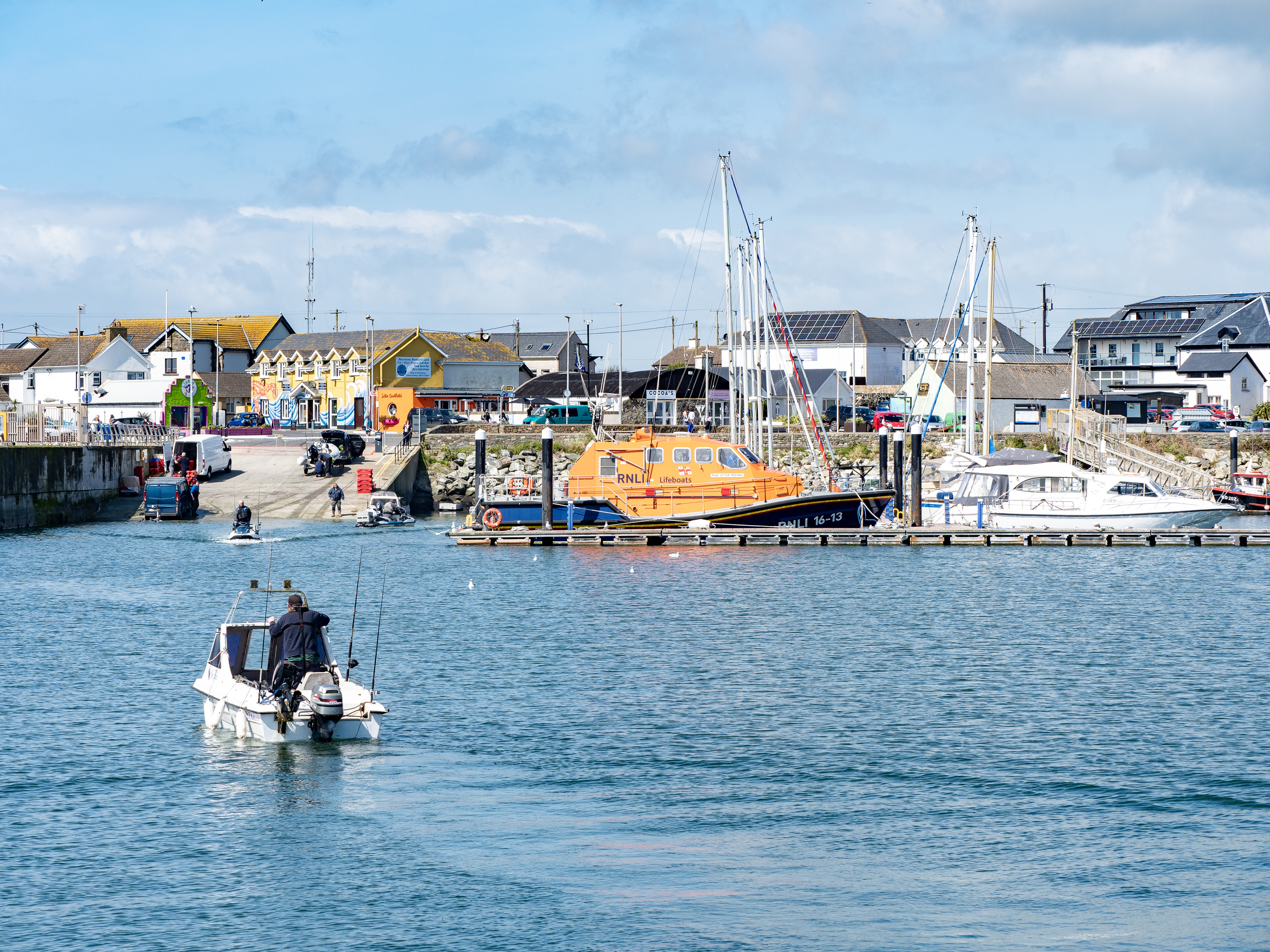
Kilmore Quay marina

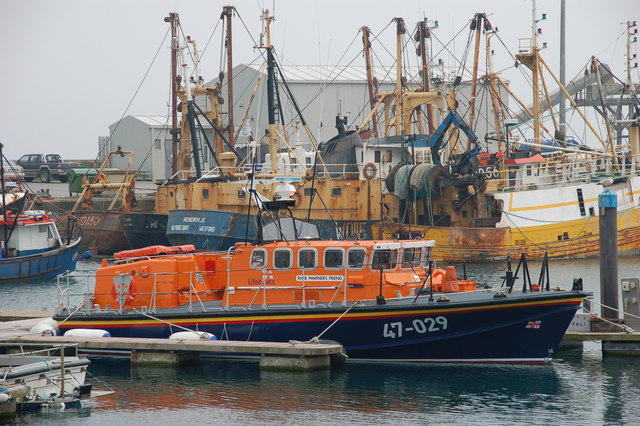
Kilmore Quay lifeboat at the marina

== See also ==
- List of towns and villages in Ireland
- List of RNLI stations
