= Wellingtonbridge =

Village in County Wexford, Ireland

Wellingtonbridge Droichead Eoin
- Village
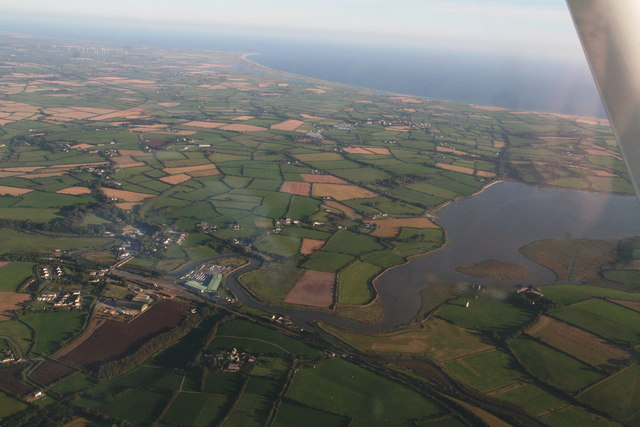
- Aerial view of Wellingtonbridge

- Location in Ireland
- Coordinates: 52°16′01″N 06°44′46″W
- Country: Ireland
- Province: Leinster
- County: Wexford
- Time zone: UTC+0 (WET)
  - Summer (DST): UTC-1 (IST (WEST))
- Area code: 051

Wellingtonbridge (Irish: Droichead Eoin), also spelled Wellington Bridge, is a village in south County Wexford, Ireland. It lies some 24 km west of Wexford and 28 km east of Waterford, at the intersection of the R733 and R736 regional roads. It was historically called Ballyowen (Irish: Baile Eoin) after the townland it occupies.

== Facilities ==
The village has a wide array of facilities and amenities for its size, including but not limited to a car dealership, department store, furniture shop, opticians, petrol station, pharmacy, playground, and vet.

== Transport ==
=== Rail ===
The village was on the Limerick-Rosslare railway line: Wellingtonbridge railway station, which was formerly an important point for the loading of sugar beet, opened on 1 August 1906 and closed on 18 September 2010.

=== Bus ===
The rail service was replaced by a revised Bus Éireann route 370 service from Monday 20 September 2010. It is also served by Local Link route 388 as well as once-weekly Bus Éireann route 372.

Ardcavan, a County Wexford-based bus company provided a daily service from Wellingtonbridge to Dublin and Dublin Airport for many years though this route was discontinued in 2018.

== Ballylannan Church and Cemetery ==
Ballylannan Church and Cemetery is located approximately 750 m to the west of the centre of Wellingtonbridge, on the north bank of the Owenduff River.
In 1824, a mausoleum was erected on the south wall of the church by Francis Leigh, planned and later used for his own family. A date plaque set into this side of the church has the Latin phrase "Deus Nobis Haec Otia Fecit", a phrase also used as the motto of Liverpool city, roughly translated to English as "God has given us this tranquility" or "God hath granted us this ease".

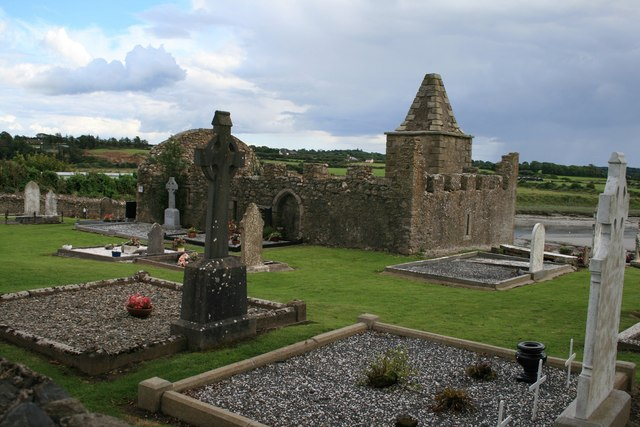
View of the northwest side of the cemetery

== Notable people ==
- Mick Wallace, businessman and politician

== See also ==
- County Wexford
- List of towns and villages in the Republic of Ireland
