= Dwayne =

Name list

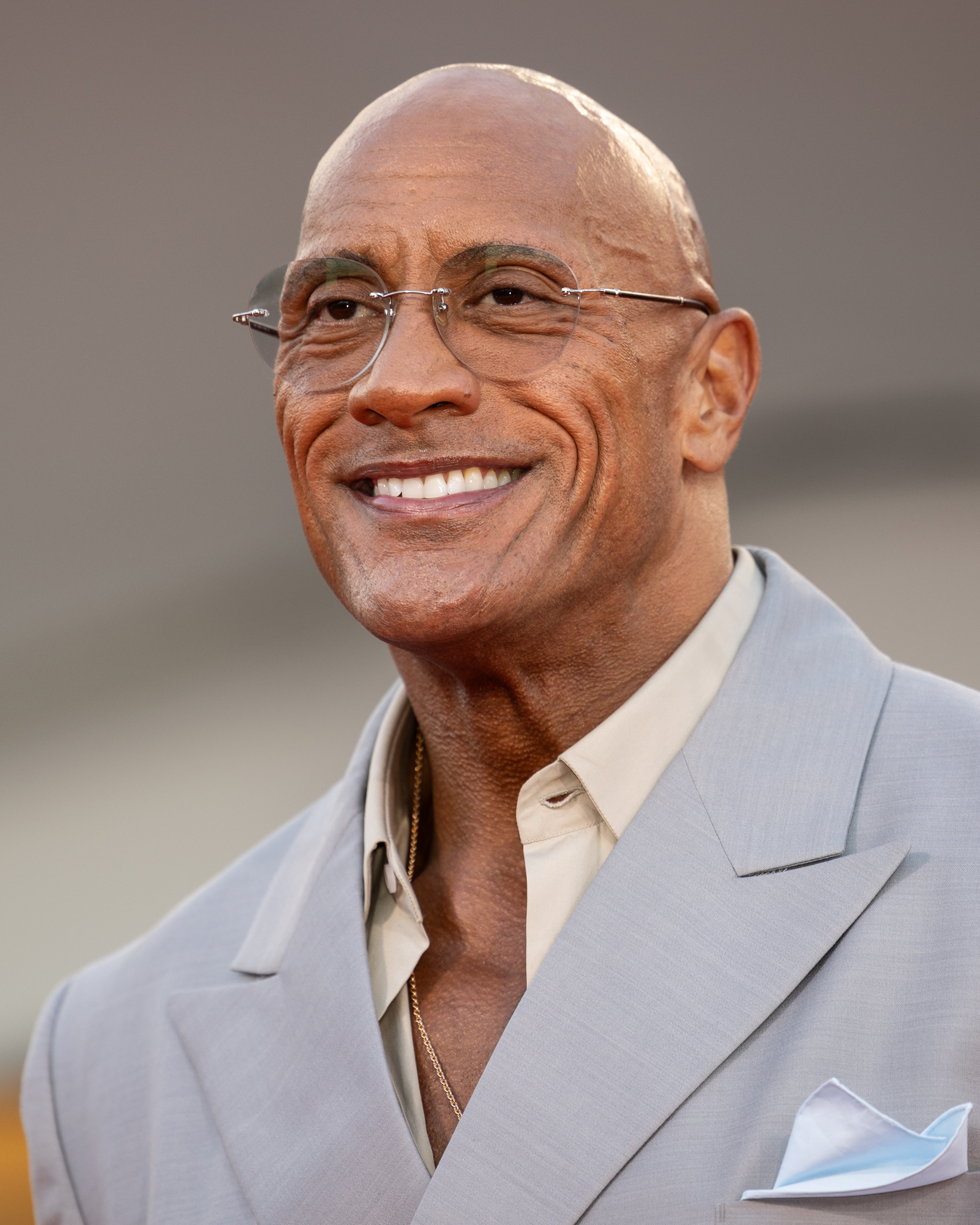
- Dwayne Johnson in 2025
- Pronunciation: Duh-Wayne or Dwain
- Gender: Male

Origin
- Origin: St. Dubhán
- Region of origin: Gaelic

Dwayne or Dewayne is a traditionally male name, a variant of Duane. It is Gaelic in origin, deriving from the Irish saint Dubhán.

== History ==
St. Dubhán was an Irish monk who established a monastery in Hook Head, Ireland, during the 5th century. As a surname, it is O'Dubhain, or Dubhan. Dubhain was a popular given name in 16th-century southern Ireland. Its Anglicized form is Dwayne or Duane. In Irish, "dubh" means "black".

=== Variant forms ===
- Dewayne
- Dewaine
- Dewane
- Duaine
- Duane
- Duwain
- Duwaine
- Duwayne
- Dwain
- Dwaine
- Dwane

== Given name ==
- Dwayne Abernathy (born 1976), American musician and record producer better known as Dem Jointz.
- Dwayne Allen (born 1990), American football player
- Dwayne Alons (1946–2014), American politician
- Dwayne Ambusley (born 1980), Jamaican footballer
- Dwayne Anderson (born 1986), American basketball player
- Dwayne Anderson (American football) (born 1961), American football player
- Dwayne Andreas (1918–2016), American business executive and political donor
- Dwayne Armstrong (born 1971), American football player
- Dwayne Bacon (born 1995), American basketball player
- Dwayne Barker (born 1983), English rugby league footballer
- Dwayne Benjamin (economist) (born 1961), Canadian economist
- Dwayne Benjamin (basketball) (born 1993), American basketball player
- Dwayne Blakley (born 1979), American football player
- Dwayne Bohac (born 1966), American politician
- Dwayne Bowe (born 1984), American football player
- Dwayne Bravo (born 1983), Trinidadian cricketer
- Dwayne Broyles (born 1982), American basketball player
- Dwayne Burno (1970–2013), American jazz bassist
- Dwayne Cameron (born 1981), New Zealand actor, director, and screenwriter
- Dwayne Carey-Hill, American animation director
- Dwayne Carswell (born 1972), American football player
- Dwayne Carter (born 1982), American rapper better known as Lil Wayne.
- Dwayne Cowan (born 1985), English sprinter
- Dwayne Croft, American operatic baritone
- Dwayne Crompton (1946–2022), American early childhood professional
- Dwayne A. Day, American space historian
- Dwyane Demmin (born 1975), Trinidad and Tobago association football defender
- Dwayne De Rosario (born 1978), Canadian soccer player
- Dwayne Fields (fl. 2010–), Jamaican-British explorer and Chief Scout
- Dwayne Haskins (1997–2022), American football quarterback
- Dwayne Henry (born 1962), American baseball player
- Dwayne Hickman (1934–2022), American actor, television director, and network executive
- Dwayne Hill (born 1966), Canadian actor
- Dwayne Hixon, Montserratian politician
- Dwayne Hollis (born 1989), American football player
- Dwayne Johnson (born 1972), American actor and professional wrestler, also known as The Rock.
- Dwayne Jones (disambiguation), various people
- Dwayne King (disambiguation), various people
- Dwayne McDuffie (1962–2011), American writer of comic books and television
- Dwayne Rudd (born 1976), American football player
- Dwayne Russell (born 1965), Australian rules footballer
- Dwayne Smith (born 1983), a cricketer from Barbados
- Dwyane Wade (born 1982), American basketball player
- Dwayne Washington (disambiguation), various people
- Dwayne Yunker, American politician from Oregon

=== Alternative spellings ===
- Dewayne Alexander, American football coach
- DeWayne Antonio Craddock (1978–2019), American mass shooter
- DeWayne Barrett (born 1981), Jamaican sprinter
- Dewayne Blackwell (1936–2021), American songwriter
- Dewayne Bowden (born 1982), New Zealand cricketer
- DeWayne Bruce (born 1962), American professional wrestler
- DeWayne Buice (born 1957), American baseball pitcher
- Dewayne Bunch (Kentucky politician) (1962–2012), American politician
- Dewayne Bunch (Tennessee politician) (born 1959), American politician
- DeWayne Burns (born 1972), American politician
- Dewayne Cherrington (born 1990), American football player
- Dewayne Dedmon (born 1989), American basketball player
- DeWayne Dotson (born 1971), American football player
- Dewayne Douglas (1931–2000), American football player
- Dewayne Everettsmith, Australian singer
- Dewayne Freeman (born 1955), American politician
- DeWayne Lee Harris (born 1963), American serial killer
- Dewayne Hendrix (born 1995), American football player
- Dewayne Hill (born 1950), American politician
- DeWayne Jackson (born 1990), American basketball player
- Dewayne Jefferson (born 1979), American basketball player
- DeWayne Jessie (born 1951), American actor
- Dewayne Johnson (born 1970s), an American groundkeeper who won lawsuits over Monsanto (Roundup cancer case)
- DeWayne Keeter (1944–1975), American motorcycle speedway rider
- DeWayne "Dewey" King (1925–2021), American football player and coach
- DeWayne Lewis (born 1985), American football player
- DeWayne "Tiny" Lund (1929–1975), American stock car racer
- DeWayne McBride (born 2001), American football player
- DeWayne McKinney, an American businessman wrongfully convicted of murder.
- DeWayne McKnight (born 1954), American funk guitarist
- DeWayne Patmon (born 1979), American football player
- DeWayne Patterson (born 1984), American football player
- Dewayne Pemberton (born 1956), American politician
- Dewayne Perkins, American comedian, actor, and writer
- Dewayne E. Perry, American engineer
- Dewayne Robertson (born 1981), American football player
- DeWayne Russell (born 1994), American basketball player
- DeWayne Scales (born 1958), American basketball player
- Dewayne Staats (born 1952), American sportscaster
- DeWayne Vaughn (born 1959), American baseball pitcher
- DeWayne Walker (born 1960), American football player and coach
- Dewayne Washington (born 1972), American football player
- Dewayne White (born 1979), American football player
- Dewayne T. Williams (1949–1968), United States Marine and posthumous Medal of Honor recipient
- DeWayne Wise (born 1978), American baseball player
- DeWayne Woods (born 1975), American gospel singer-songwriter and musician
- Dwaine O. Cowan (1935–2006), American chemist
- D'Wayne Wiggins (1961–2025), American musician
- DeWayne Wynn, American politician
- Terry DeWayne Fair, American-Israeli basketball player
- Kenneth Dwane Bowersox, American astronaut

=== Fictional characters ===
- President Dwayne Elizondo Mountain Dew Herbert Camacho, character portrayed by Terry Crews in the film Idiocracy
- Dwayne Forge, a character in the 2008 video game Grand Theft Auto IV
- Dwayne Sr. and Dwayne "Junior" Jr., two characters from The Ridonculous Race
- Dwayne T. Robinson, deputy chief of the Los Angeles Police Department, in the film Die Hard
- Dwayne Hoover, a character in the film Little Miss Sunshine
- Dwayne, a vampire from the film The Lost Boys
- Dwayne (Ninjago), a character in Ninjago

== Surname ==
- Johnathan Dwayne (born 1963), Puerto Rican musician, composer, and artist
- Sidney DeWayne (also known as Sid Johnson), songwriter, producer and personal manager

== See also ==
- Duane (given name)
- Duane (surname)
