= Duane (given name) =

Masculine given name

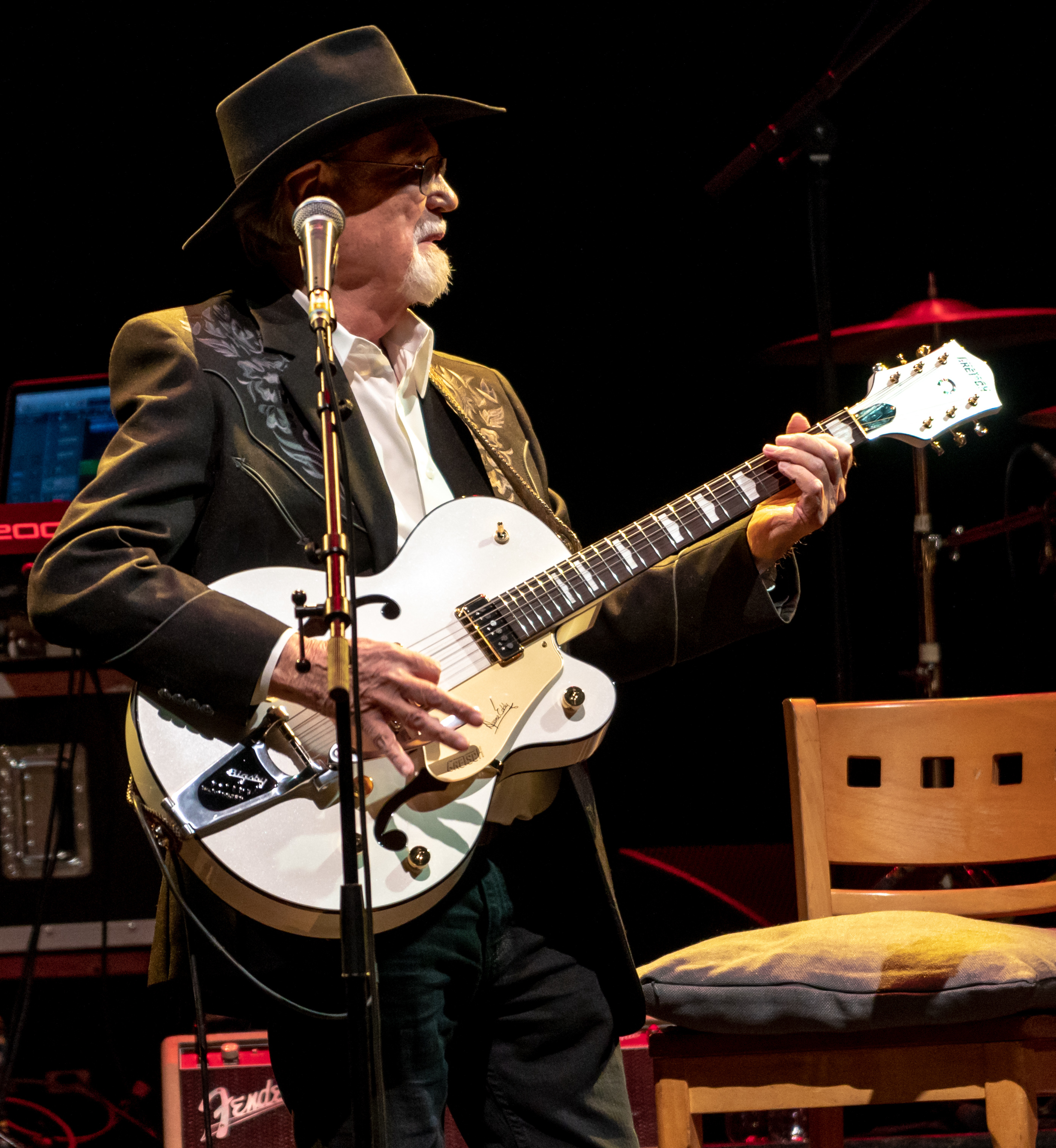
- Duane Eddy in 2018
- Pronunciation: /duːˈeɪn, dweɪn/
- Gender: Male
- Language: English

Origin
- Language: Irish
- Origin: St. Dubhán

Other names
- Alternative spelling: Dwayne
- See also: Dwain, Dwane, Dwaine

Duane is both a given name for a male, and a family name. The name is short for Dubhán which is from the name of monks from an established abbey in Hook Head, Ireland, in the 5th century. As a surname it is O'Dubhain, or Dubhan. Dubhain was a popular given name in 16th century southern Ireland; its anglicized form is Duane.

In the United States, Duane became a popular name around the 1920s and remained one of the 200 most popular names for about 50 years. The spelling Dwayne was adopted as time went on, most likely because of the also popular name Wayne. Dwayne eventually became the preferred spelling, especially in the southern U.S., while Duane remains the more common spelling in northern-Midwest states such as Minnesota, Michigan, and North Dakota. Dwyane was once a birth certificate spelling mistake that gained popularity in the 2000s and 2010s thanks to basketball legend Dwyane Wade.

== Notable people named Duane ==
- Duane Acker (1931–2024), American academic, president of Kansas State University
- Duane Allen (born 1943), lead singer of The Oak Ridge Boys country and gospel quartet
- Duane Allen (American football) (1937–2003), American football player
- Duane Allman (1946–1971), American guitarist
- Duane Bastress (born 1983), American mixed martial artist
- Duane Beeson (1921–1947), American World War II fighter pilot
- Duane Bickett (born 1962), American football player
- Duane Bobick (born 1950), American boxer
- Duane Brown (born 1985), American football player
- Duane Bryers (1911–2012), American painter, illustrator and sculptor
- Duane R. Bushey (born 1944), seventh Master Chief Petty Officer of the United States Navy
- Duane Butler (born 1973), American football linebacker
- Duane G. Carey (born 1957), American astronaut
- Duane Carter (1913–1993), American racecar driver
- Duane Pancho Carter, Jr. (born 1950), American racecar driver, son of Duane Carter
- Duane Chapman (born 1953), American bounty hunter and star of the reality TV series Dog the Bounty Hunter
- Duane Clarridge (1932–2016), American CIA supervisor known for his role in the Iran-Contra Affair
- Duane Clemons (born 1974), American football player
- Duane Courtney (born 1985), English footballer
- Duane "Keefe D" Davis, convicted orchestrator of the murder of rapper Tupac Shakur.
- Duane Denison (born 1959), American guitarist
- Duane E. Dewey (1931–2021), United States Marine
- Duane Eddy (1938–2024), American guitarist
- Duane Elgin (born 1943), American author and media activist
- Duane Erickson, American politician
- Duane Ferrell (born 1965), American basketball player
- Duane Gill (born 1959), American professional wrestler
- Duane Gish (1921–2013), American biochemist
- Duane Glinton (born 1982), Turks & Caicos Islands footballer
- Duane Graveline (1931–2016), American astronaut
- Duane D. Hackney (1947−1993), United States Air Force Pararescueman
- Duane Hanson (1925–1996), American artist and sculptor
- Duane Harden (born 1971), American singer and songwriter
- Duane Henry (born 1985), English actor
- Duane Holmes (born 1994), American-English footballer
- Duane Hudson (1910–1995), British Special Operations Executive (SOE) officer during WWII
- Duane Jones (1936–1988), American actor
- Duane Josephson (1942–1997), American baseball player
- Duane Kuiper (born 1950), American baseball sportscaster and former player
- Duane Litfin (born 1944), seventh president of Wheaton College in Wheaton, Illinois
- Duane Ludwig (born 1978), American mixed martial artist
- Duane Martin (born 1965), American film and television actor
- Duane Michals (1932–2026), American photographer
- Duane Bill Parcells (born 1941), American National Football League head coach
- Duane D. Pearsall (1922–2010), American entrepreneur known for smoke detectors
- Duane Pederson (1938–2022), American Eastern Orthodox minister
- Duane Peters (born 1961), American punk rock singer/songwriter and professional skateboarder
- Duane Pillette (1922–2011), American baseball player
- Duane Pomeroy (born 1952), American politician and teacher
- Duane Sands (born 1962), Bahamian politician
- Duane Starks (born 1974), American football cornerback
- Duane Sutter (born 1960), Canadian National Hockey League player and head coach
- Duane Swanson (1913–2000), American basketball player
- Duane Thomas (born 1947), American football player
- Duane Thomas (boxer) (1961–2000), American boxer
- Duane Washington (born 1964), American basketball player
- Duane Whitaker (born 1959), American actor
- Duane Wilson (1934–2021), American baseball player

== Fictional characters ==
- Duane Adelier, a character from Unsounded
- Duane Chow, a minor character from Breaking Bad
- Duane Hopwood, the main protagonist of the 2005 film Duane Hopwood
- Duane Hall, a character from the 1977 film Annie Hall
- Duane Kushner, a character from the 1987 novel Misery
- Duane, a character from the television show Home Movies

== See also ==
- Duane (surname)
- Dwayne, including variants such as Dwane and DeWayne
