= Duane =

Duane may refer to:

- Duane (given name), including a list of people and fictional characters with the name
- Duane (surname), including a list of people with the name
- Duane, New York, United States, a town
- USCGC Duane, a US Coast Guard cutter

== See also ==
- Duane syndrome, a rare type of strabismus
- Dwayne, a name
