= Dwane =

Dwane is a given name and an alternative spelling of Duane, Dwayne, Dewayne, Dwain, Dwaine and similar.

Notable people by that name include:

- Dwane Casey (born 1957), American basketball coach
- Dwane Lee (born 1979), English footballer
- Dwane Morrison, American basketball player and coach
- Dwane Wallace (1911–1989), American aviation businessman and aircraft designer
