= List of shipwrecks in February 1878 =

The list of shipwrecks in February 1878 includes ships sunk, foundered, grounded, or otherwise lost during February 1878.

== 1 February ==
List of shipwrecks: 1 February 1878
Ship	State	Description
Chattanooga	United States	The brig was driven ashore at Cove Point, Maryland with some loss of life. She was on a voyage from Baltimore, Maryland to Demerara, British Guiana.
Diana	United Kingdom	The steamship was driven ashore near Slade Castle in Slade, County Wexford.
Georg Andreas	Norway	The ship was wrecked at Randesund.
Margaret Jones	United Kingdom	The schooner was driven ashore and wrecked between Souter Point, Northumberland and Whitburn, County Durham. Her crew were rescued by the tug Scottish Maid (United Kingdom). Margaret Jones was on a voyage from the River Tyne to Plymouth, Devon.
Orion	United Kingdom	The steamship was driven ashore at "Budget", Calcutta, India. She was refloated with assistance.
Providence	France	The lugger foundered off the Runnel Stone. Her three crew were rescued. She was on a voyage from Cardiff, Glamorgan, United Kingdom to Nantes, Loire-Inférieure.
Teviot	United Kingdom	The steamship ran aground in the Hooghly River. She was on a voyage from Calcutta to Bombay, India.

== 2 February ==
List of shipwrecks: 2 February 1878
Ship	State	Description
Abigail	United States	The ship was wrecked on the Flogger Shoal. She was on a voyage from Amsterdam, North Holland, Netherlands to Philadelphia, Pennsylvania.
Africaine	France	The brig foundered off Cape Carbonara, Sardinia, Italy. Her crew were rescued by Adina (Italy). Africaine was on a voyage from Bône, Algeria to Antwerp, Belgium.
Auguste Solscher	Germany	The barque was wrecked on the Longsand, in the North Sea off the coast of Essex, United Kingdom, or on the Kentish Knock. She was on a voyage from Hamburg to Valparaíso, Chile.
Isabella	Italy	The brig foundered off Asinara, Sardinia with the loss of four of her ten crew. She was on a voyage from Kronstadt, Russia to Livorno.
Lise	France	The brig was driven ashore and wrecked at "Amrovia", Italy. She was on a voyage from Carloforte, Italy to Marseille, Bouches-du-Rhône.
Negeisus	Germany	The ship was sighted in the Øresund whilst on a voyage from Libava, Courland Governorate to a port on the east coast of the United Kingdom. No further trace, reported missing.
Orfeo	Italy	The brig was wrecked near Bizerte, Algeria. She was on a voyage from Barcelona, Spain to Livorno.
Pingon	Spain	The steamship ran aground off New Romney, Kent, United Kingdom. She was on a voyage from Antwerp, Belgium to Lisbon, Portugal.
Roma	Italy	The full-rigged ship was driven ashore near Siniscola, Sardinia.
Stavanger	Norway	The full-rigged ship was driven ashore and wrecked at "Amrovia".
Vincenzo	Italy	The brigantine was driven ashore at Dungeness, Kent. She was on a voyage from London, United Kingdom to Cette, Hérault, France. She was refloated.
Zephyrine	United States	The ship was driven ashore and wrecked at Boston, Massachusetts. She was on a voyage from Demerara, British Guiana to Boston.

== 3 February ==
List of shipwrecks: 3 February 1878
Ship	State	Description
Constitution	United Kingdom	The tug sprang a leak at Birkenhead, Cheshire and was beached at Tranmere, Cheshire.
Foyle	United Kingdom	The steamship was driven ashore at New Ferry, Cheshire. She was refloated with assistance from the tug Begone (United Kingdom) and resumed her voyage.
Stonehouse	United Kingdom	The ship foundered off Asinara, Sardinia, Italy with the loss of three of her crew. She was on a voyage from Kronstadt, Russia to Livorno, Italy.

== 4 February ==
List of shipwrecks: 4 February 1878
Ship	State	Description
Cameroon	United Kingdom	The steamship was driven ashore near Crosby, Lancashire. She was on a voyage from Africa to Liverpool, Lancashire. She was refloated.
Charlotte	United Kingdom	The ketch was driven ashore near Saltfleethaven, Lincolnshire. She was on a voyage from Newcastle upon Tyne, Northumberland to Wisbech, Cambridgeshire.
Delawar	United Kingdom	The ship .
Edward Herbert	United Kingdom	The ship was driven ashore and wrecked on the coast of Mossoró, Brazil. She was on a voyage from Bahia to Mossoró.
Mary D	Austria-Hungary	The ship was driven ashore at "Galippa", Beylik of Tunis with the loss of four lives. She was on a voyage from Catania, Sicily, Italy to New York, United States.
Orlando	Canada	The barque capsized in the Atlantic Ocean. Her crew were rescued by Duisberg (Germany). Orlando was on a voyage from Baltimore, Maryland, United States to Gloucester, United Kingdom.
Western Belle	United Kingdom	The brig was driven ashore and wrecked at "Coronier", British Guiana.

== 5 February ==
List of shipwrecks: 5 February 1878
Ship	State	Description
Aberavon	United Kingdom	The steamship ran aground in Thornton Loch.
Anthes	(United Kingdom of Great Britain and Ireland) Guernsey	The brig collided with the barque Atlantic (Sweden) and sank off The Lizard, Cornwall with the loss of four of her nine crew. Survivors were rescued by Atlantic. Anthes was on a voyage from Cardiff, Glamorgan to Granville, Manche, France.
Ascupart	United Kingdom	The steamship ran aground at Leith, Lothian. She was on a voyage from New Orleans, Louisiana, United States to Leith. She was refloated with the assistance of a tug.
Cobden, and Norman	United Kingdom	The steamships collided at Middlesbrough, Yorkshire and were both severely damaged. Cobden was on a voyage from Middlesbrough to London. Norman was on a voyage from Bilbao, Spain to Middlesbrough.
Ilen	United Kingdom	The steamship struck a sunken wreck and was damaged. She was on a voyage from London to Ghent, East Flanders, Belgium. She completed her voyage in a leaky condition.
Perpetric	United Kingdom	The brig was severely damaged by an onboard explosion and fire. She was on a voyage from Cardiff, Glamorgan to Pernambuco, Brazil. She was towed in to Milford Haven, Pembrokeshire.
Ringdove	United Kingdom	The steamship was driven ashore in the River Thames at the Coalhouse Fort, Essex. She was refloated and resumed her voyage.
Zero	United Kingdom	The steamship was wrecked at "Colon", on the south coast of Mallorca, Spain. Her crew were rescued.

== 6 February ==
List of shipwrecks: 6 February 1878
Ship	State	Description
Adelina	United Kingdom	The ship was driven ashore at Flamborough Head, Yorkshire. She was on a voyage from Wisbeach, Cambridgeshire to South Shields, County Durham. She was refloated and resumed her voyage.
Agnes	United Kingdom	The brigantine was severely damaged at Dublin when a steam crane collapsed onto her.
Anna Oneto	Italy	The ship was driven ashore at Lewes, Delaware, United States. She was on a voyage from Savona to the Delaware Breakwater. She was refloated.
Anne Cheshyre	United Kingdom	The ship was driven ashore at "North Edisto". She was on a voyage from Saint Thomas, Virgin Islands to Port Royal, Jamaica. She was refloated and completed her voyage in a leaky condition.
Assyrian	Canada	The ship departed from New York, United States for Queenstown, County Cork, United Kingdom. No further trace, reported missing.
Holland	Netherlands	The steamship collided with the steamship Mount Stewart (United Kingdom) and sank in the River Thames at Gravesend, Kent, United Kingdom. All on board were rescued. Holland was on a voyage from Rotterdam, South Holland to London, United Kingdom.
May Queen	United Kingdom	The steamship collided with the steamship Annie Ainslie (United Kingdom) and sank in the North Sea off Filey, Yorkshire. Her seventeen crew were rescued by Annie Ainslie. May Queen was on a voyage from Rouen, Seine-Inférieure, France to Middlesbrough, Yorkshire.

== 7 February ==
List of shipwrecks: 7 February 1878
Ship	State	Description
Baltimore	Germany	The steamship was run ashore at Fort McHenry, Maryland, United States in order to avoid a collision with another vessel. She was on a voyage from Baltimore, Maryland to Bremen. She was refloated with assistance and resumed her voyage the next day.
Duguesclin	United Kingdom	The sloop struck the Plough Seat Rock, in the North Sea off the coast of Northumberland. She was taken in to Lindisfarne in a leaky condition.
Cleadon	United Kingdom	The steamship ran aground on the Goodwin Sands, Kent. She was on a voyage from Sunderland, County Durham to Saint-Nazaire, Loire-Inférieure, France. She was refloated and resumed her voyage.
Feronia	Germany	The steamship ran aground on the Cow Ledge, off the Isle of Wight, United Kingdom. She was on a voyage from Shanghai, China to London, United Kingdom. She was refloated the next day with the assistance of the Coastguard and resumed her voyage.
Otto George	Germany	The ship capsized, caught fire and sank in the Atlantic Ocean with the loss of all hands.
Padre	Italy	The barque ran aground at Fleetwood, Lancashire, United Kingdom. She was refloated and taken in to Fleetwood.
Ulleswater	United Kingdom	The steamship was driven ashore at the North Foreland, Kent. She was on a voyage from Bilbao, Spain to Newcastle upon Tyne, Northumberland. She was refloated the next day with the assistance of four tugs and taken in to Deal, Kent.
Unnamed	Greece	The brig was driven ashore near Algeciras, Spain. She was on a voyage from Marseille, Bouches-du-Rhône, France to Senegal. She was refloated.

== 8 February ==
List of shipwrecks: 8 February 1878
Ship	State	Description
Admiral	United Kingdom	The ship struck rocks at Saint-Malo, Ille-et-Vilaine, France. She was on a voyage from Saint-Malo to Gloucester. She was towed back to Saint-Malo, where she sank.
Albert	United Kingdom	The steamship ran aground at Maassluis, South Holland, Netherlands.
Ann Beer	United Kingdom	The ship ran aground on the Spijker Plaat, off the coast of Zeeland, Netherlands. She was on a voyage from Fowey, Cornwall to Antwerp, Belgium. She was refloated and resumed her voyage.
Esea	Sweden	The schooner was driven ashore near Mandal, Norway. Her crew were rescued. She was on a voyage from Brevik, Norway to Grimsby, Lincolnshire, United Kingdom.
Johanne	Germany	The schooner was driven ashore on Læsø, Denmark.
Lady Bertha	United Kingdom	The ship was driven ashore at Gibraltar. She was on a voyage from Cartagena, Spain to Cardiff, Glamorgan. She was refloated.
Lochgiel	United Kingdom	The barque was abandoned in the Atlantic Ocean. Her crew were rescued by the barque Nordpol (Germany). Lochgiel was on a voyage from the Clyde to Rio de Janeiro, Brazil.
Marianne Briggs	United Kingdom	The steamship ran aground on the Medem Sand. She was on a voyage from Goole, Yorkshire to Hamburg, Germany. She was refloated.
Rangatira	United Kingdom	The schooner ran aground on the Dogger Bank, in the Irish Sea off the coast of County Waterford. She was on a voyage from Porthcawl, Glamorgan to Wexford.
Silver Cloud	United Kingdom	The barque was sighted off Point Lepreaux, New Brunswick, Canada whilst on a voyage from Dublin to Saint John, New Brunswick. No further trace, reported missing.
Ulleswater	United Kingdom	The steamship ran aground at the South Foreland, Kent. She was on a voyage from Bilbao, Spain to Newcastle upon Tyne, Northumberland.

== 9 February ==
List of shipwrecks: 9 February 1878
Ship	State	Description
HMS Alexandra	Royal Navy	The ship ran aground in the Dardanelles. She was refloated with assistance from HMS Sultan (Royal Navy).
City of Dallas	United States	The ship caught fire at New York and was scuttled. She was on a voyage from Fernandina Island, Galapagos Islands to New York.
Douse	United Kingdom	The brigantine ran aground at Port William, Wigtownshire. She was on a voyage from Ardrossan, Ayrshire to Port William.
Henriette	Germany	The brig was run into by the schooner Henriette (United Kingdom) off the Eddystone Lighthouse, Cornwall, United Kingdom. She was abandoned the next day in a sinking condition.
Kaugatira	United Kingdom	The schooner ran aground on the Doggerbank, in the Irish Sea. She was on a voyage from Porthcawl, Glamorgan to Wexford.
Little Gem	United Kingdom	The schooner was run down and sunk off Scarborough, Yorkshire by the steamship Dunedin (United Kingdom). Her crew were rescued. Little Gem was on a voyage from the Humber to Newcastle upon Tyne, Northumberland.
Lochgoil	United Kingdom	The barque was abandoned at sea. Her crew were rescued by Nordpole (Germany). Lochgoil was on a voyage from Glasgow, Renfrewshire to Rio de Janeiro, Brazil.

== 10 February ==
List of shipwrecks: 10 February 1878
Ship	State	Description
Henriette	Germany	The brig collided with the schooner Branch (United Kingdom) and sank off the Eddystone Lighthouse, Cornwall, United Kingdom. Her crew survived.

== 11 February ==
List of shipwrecks: 11 February 1878
Ship	State	Description
Beauty	Canada	The brigantine was abandoned in the Atlantic Ocean. Her crew were rescued by the brigantine Genoa ( Canada). Beauty was on a voyage from Portrush, County Antrim, United Kingdom to New York, United States.
Mabel	United Kingdom	The steamship was driven ashore at the mouth of the River Tyne and was abandoned by her four crew. She was on her maiden voyage, from Montrose, Forfarshire to Newcastle upon Tyne, Northumberland. She had been refloated by 16 February.
Maggie Chapman	(Dominion of Newfoundland) Newfoundland Colony	The barque was abandoned in the Atlantic Ocean. Her crew were rescued by the barque Maria (Spain). Maggie Chapman was on a voyage from Philadelphia, Pennsylvania, United States to Antwerp, Belgium.

== 12 February ==
List of shipwrecks: 12 February 1878
Ship	State	Description
Carrie Winslow	United States	The brig collided with the full-rigged ship British American (United Kingdom) and sank. She was on a voyage from Montevideo, Uruguay to New York.
Castor	Netherlands	The steamship ran aground in the Noordzeekanaal at Oostzaan, North Holland. She was on a voyage from Amsterdam, North Holland to Palermo, Sicily, Italy.
Johann August	Germany	The ship departed from Lisbon, Portugal for London, United Kingdom. No further trace, reported missing.
Jupiter	France	The schooner collided with the steamship Flecha (Belgium) and sank on the Wielingen Sandbank, off the Belgian coast with the loss of a crew member. Jupiter was on a voyage from Bordeaux, Gironde to Ghent, East Flanders, Belgium.

== 13 February ==
List of shipwrecks: 13 February 1878
Ship	State	Description
Elise	United Kingdom	The ship was wrecked at East London, Cape Colony.
Kafir	United Kingdom	The steamship was wrecked at Simonstown, Cape Colony. All on board were rescued. She was on a voyage from Cape Town, Cape Colony to Zanzibar.
Olive	United Kingdom	The barque was wrecked at East London.
Violet	United Kingdom	The smack was driven ashore 2 nautical miles (3.7 km) south of Withernsea, Yorkshire. Her crew were rescued.

== 14 February ==
List of shipwrecks: 14 February 1878
Ship	State	Description
Excelsior	New Zealand	The 35-ton barge ran aground at Amuri Bluff and became a wreck. All crew survived.

== 15 February ==
List of shipwrecks: 15 February 1878
Ship	State	Description
Ane Kjerstine	Denmark	The schooner departed from Gallipoli, Ottoman Empire for Antwerp, Belgium. She subsequently capsized. Ane Kjerstine was towed in to Le Tréport, Seine-Inférieure, France in a capsized condition on 23 June.
Bon Accord	United Kingdom	The steamship was driven ashore at Flamborough Head, Yorkshire. She was on a voyage from Antwerp, Belgium to Aberdeen. She was refloated and resumed her voyage.
Lidador	Portugal	The steamship was wrecked on Terceira Island, Azores. All on board were rescued.
HMS Raleigh	Royal Navy	The frigate ran aground near the entrance to the Dardanelles off the Rabbit Islands, Ottoman Empire. She was refloated three or four days later, probably with the assistance of HMS Devastation and HMS Hotspur (both Royal Navy).

== 16 February ==
List of shipwrecks: 16 February 1878
Ship	State	Description
Britannia	United Kingdom	The barque was abandoned in the Atlantic Ocean. Her crew were rescued by the barque Ino (Sweden). Britannia was on a voyage from Pensacola, Florida, United States to Deal, Kent.
Curlew	United Kingdom	The steamship was driven ashore at Svaneke, Denmark. She was on a voyage from Libava, Courland Governorate to Dundee, Forfarshire. She was refloated.
Forest Belle	United Kingdom	The ship ran aground at Botel Tobago, Formosa. She was consequently beached at South Cape in Kiva Liang Bay. Most of her crew were taken off by an Imperial Chinese Navy gunboat. The ship was subsequently burnt by the local inhabitants. The remainder of her crew were rescued by USS Ranger (United States Navy). Forest Belle was on a voyage from Cardiff, Glamorgan to Hong Kong.
Gattomo M.	Italy	The barque was wrecked on the Karaburun Peninsula, Ottoman Empire with some loss of life. She was on a voyage from Constantinople, Ottoman Empire to Odesa, Russia.
Plaisance	United Kingdom	The barque was driven ashore at Lydd, Kent. She was refloated.
Retreiver	United Kingdom	The steamship was driven ashore at Lindisfarne, Northumberland.
Teledo	United Kingdom	The barque was sighted in the Atlantic Ocean whilst on a voyage from Baltimore, Maryland, United States to London. No further trace, reported missing.

== 17 February ==
List of shipwrecks: 17 February 1878
Ship	State	Description
Alice Graham	United Kingdom	The barque ran aground at Lowestoft, Suffolk. She was on a voyage from Baltimore, Maryland, United States to Lowestoft. She was refloated and taken in to Lowestoft.
Arratoon Apcar	United Kingdom	The steamship was wrecked on the Fowey Rocks, off the coast of Florida, United States. Her 25 crew were rescued by Tappahannock (United States). Arratoon Apcar was on a voyage from Havana, Cuba to Liverpool, Lancashire.
C. M. Palmer	United Kingdom	The steamship was run into by the steamship Ludworth (United Kingdom) and sank in the North Sea off Harwich, Essex with the loss of seventeen lives. There were at least 43 survivors, who were rescued by Ludworth. C. M. Palmer was on a voyage from Newcastle upon Tyne, Northumberland to London.
John Gladstone	Canada	The full-rigged ship was abandoned in the Atlantic Ocean. Her crew were rescued by the brig Alliance (United Kingdom). John Gladstone was on a voyage from Antwerp, Belgium to the Hampton Roads, Virginia, United States.
Margaretha	Germany	The ship foundered in the North Sea 50 nautical miles (93 km) south east of Lindisfarne, Northumberland. Her crew were rescued by the schooner Hermann (United Kingdom). Margaretha was on a voyage from East Wemyss, Fife, United Kingdom to Bremerhaven.

== 18 February ==
List of shipwrecks: 18 February 1878
Ship	State	Description
Amazones	United Kingdom	The steamship collided with an Ottoman Navy man-of-war at Galaţi, Ottoman Empire and was severely damaged.
Amor	Flag unknown	The ship was driven ashore at Lysekil, Norway. She was on a voyage from Lisbon, Portugal to Gothenburg, Sweden.
Highland Mary	United Kingdom	The schooner ran aground on the North Scaw Bank, off the coast of Ayrshire. She was on a voyage from Belfast, County Antrim to Troon, Ayrshire. She was refloated and resumed her voyage.
Lord Clive	United Kingdom	The steamship was driven ashore at Philadelphia, Pennsylvania, United States. She was on a voyage from Liverpool, Lancashire to Philadelphia.
Medford, and an Unnamed vessel	United Kingdom	The barque capsized and sank at Liverpool, Lancashire, sinking a Mersey Flat.
Motala	Sweden	The steamship was wrecked at Lemvig, Denmark. All on board were rescued. She was on a voyage from Rouen, Seine-Inférieure, France to Pillau, Germany.
P. R. Hazeltine	United States	The steamship foundered off Cape Horn, Chile. Some of her crew were rescued by Gustave (France). Others reached San Francisco, California in a boat.
Rolf	Netherlands	The steamship was driven ashore on Saltholm, Denmark. She was on a voyage from Libava, Courland Governorate to Calais, France. She was refloated with the assistance of a steamship and taken in to Copenhagen, Denmark.
Scawfell	United Kingdom	The ship collided with another vessel and was driven ashore at Rangoon, Burma. She was refloated.
Sensitive	France	The schooner was driven ashore and wrecked at Berville-sur-Seine, Seine-Inférieure. She was on a voyage from Swansea, Glamorgan, United Kingdom to Pont-Audemer, Eure.

== 19 February ==
List of shipwrecks: 19 February 1878
Ship	State	Description
Ann	United Kingdom	The schooner was driven ashore at Holyhead, Anglesey. She was on a voyage from Dublin to Garvan, Caithness. She was refloated with assistance from the tug Alliance (United Kingdom).
Corinth	United Kingdom	The steamship was beached at Milford Haven, Pembrokeshire. She was on a voyage from Neath, Glamorgan to Cork.
Eureka	Netherlands	The galiot was wrecked at Agger, Denmark. Her crew were rescued. She was on a voyage from Newcastle upon Tyne, Northumberland, United Kingdom to Holmstad, Norway.
Kanagawa	Netherlands	The ship ran aground on the Goodwin Sands, Kent, United Kingdom. She was on a voyage from Rotterdam, South Holland to Batavia, Netherlands East Indies. She was refloated and resumed her voyage.
Lilly Green	United Kingdom	The ship was driven ashore at "Glynog", Caernarfonshire.
Loreley	United Kingdom	The steamship was wrecked near the Sholpin Lighthouse, near Stolpemünde, Germany. She was on a voyage from Middlesbrough, Yorkshire to Pillau, Germany.
Seth	Trieste	The barque was abandoned in the Atlantic Ocean. Her crew were rescued by the brig Meletos (Norway). Seth was on a voyage from Portland, Maine, United States to Falmouth, Cornwall, United Kingdom.
Vascongada	Norway	The schooner was driven ashore at Tornby, Sweden. She was on a voyage from Porsgrund to Hartlepool, County Durham, United Kingdom.
Voyager	United States	The full-rigged ship was presumed to have capsized and foundered with the loss of all hands on this date. She was on a voyage from New York to Bristol, Gloucestershire, United Kingdom.

== 20 February ==
List of shipwrecks: 20 February 1878
Ship	State	Description
Beaver	United Kingdom	The steamship put in to Campbeltown, Argyllshire on fire. She was on a voyage from the Clyde to the Charente.
Celestial Empire	United States	The clipper ship was abandoned during a voyage from Hamburg, Germany to New York.
Enterprise	United Kingdom	The ketch was wrecked at Newtown, Isle of Wight. She was on a voyage from London to Porthleven, Cornwall.
Joan Cunllo	Spain	The steamship was driven ashore at Torre del Mar. Her crew were rescued. She was on a voyage from the River Tyne to Torre del Mar.
Maria	United Kingdom	The ship grounded on her anchor, capsized and drove ashore at Barrow-in-Furness, Lancashire. She was on a voyage from Wicklow to Barrow in Furness.
Martin Scott	United Kingdom	The full-rigged ship was driven ashore in the Columbia River She was on a voyage from Astoria, Oregon, United States to Port Chalmers, New Zealand.
Royalist	United Kingdom	The floating police station was run into by Flying Venus (United Kingdom) at Blackwall, Middlesex and was severely damaged.
Water Lily	United Kingdom	The ketch ran aground on the Cutler Sand, in the North Sea off the coast of Essex. She was on a voyage from Goole, Yorkshire to London. She was refloated with assistance from the smack Violet (United Kingdom) and assisted in to Harwich, Essex.
Unnamed	Flag unknown	The full-rigged ship foundered in the Atlantic Ocean (48°52′N 20°22′W).

== 21 February ==
List of shipwrecks: 21 February 1878
Ship	State	Description
Adelheid	Germany	The schooner was driven ashore and wrecked at the Sandhammaren, Sweden with the loss of three lives. She was on a voyage from Delfzijl, Groningen, Netherlands to Riga, Russia.
Avon	United Kingdom	The trow was run into by the steamship J. M. Lennard (United Kingdom) and sank. Avon was on a voyage from Avonmouth, Somerset to Bristol, Gloucestershire.
Emma	Italy	The barque ran aground at Queenstown, County Cork, United Kingdom.
Hope	United Kingdom	The ship was driven ashore at Ayr.
Iris	United Kingdom	The ship was driven ashore at Blakeney, Norfolk. She was on a voyage from Hartlepool, County Durham to Sheringham, Norfolk.
Lafontaine	United Kingdom	The ship was wrecked 18 nautical miles (33 km) from Elephant Point, Burma.
Mathilde	Denmark	The ship ran aground south of Whitepoint, County Cork.
Moldavia	United Kingdom	The steamship was wrecked near Dunraven Castle, Glamorgan. Her crew were rescued.

== 22 February ==
List of shipwrecks: 22 February 1878
Ship	State	Description
Peter Lauritz	Denmark	The schooner was wrecked at Nidingen, Sweden. Her crew were rescued. She was on a voyage from Ystad, Sweden to Liverpool, Lancashire, United Kingdom.

== 23 February ==
List of shipwrecks: 23 February 1878
Ship	State	Description
Firebrick	United Kingdom	The steamship collided with the ironclad Independencia (Imperial Brazilian Navy) in the River Thames at Greenhithe, Kent and was damaged. Firebrick was on a voyage from London to Newcastle upon Tyne, Northumberland. She put back to the Chalkstone's River for repairs.
Henry Pelham	United Kingdom	The barque was driven ashore in the Ocracoke Inlet. Her crew were rescued. She was on a voyage from Ipswich, Suffolk to Baltimore, Maryland, United States.
Herbert Beech	United Kingdom	The full-rigged ship was driven ashore in the Beaufort River.
Philip Suppicich	Germany	The barque was driven ashore and wrecked in the Ockracoke Inlet with the loss of all twelve crew.
Podensac	France	The brig ran aground on the Richard Bank, in the Gironde. She was on a voyage from Guadeloupe to Bordeaux, Gironde. She was refloated on 26 February and completed her voyage.
St. Bernard	United Kingdom	The ship was driven ashore on Reedy Island, Delaware, United States. She was on a voyage from Philadelphia, Pennsylvania, United States to Liverpool, Lancashire.
Sunnyside	United Kingdom	The barque was abandoned in the Atlantic Ocean. Her crew were rescued by the steamship State of Virginia (United Kingdom). Sunnyside was on a voyage from New York, United States to Penzance, Cornwall.

== 24 February ==
List of shipwrecks: 24 February 1878
Ship	State	Description
Oguendo	Spain	The ship was lost in the English Channel. Her thirteen crew were rescued by a French fishing boat. She was on a voyage from London, United Kingdom to Havana, Cuba.
Tornado	United Kingdom	The ship caught fire at New Orleans, Louisiana and was severely damaged. She was scuttled.

== 25 February ==
List of shipwrecks: 25 February 1878
Ship	State	Description
Columbia	Norway	The barque was abandoned in the Atlantic Ocean. Her crew were rescued by the barque Mizpah (United Kingdom). Columbia was on a voyage from Rotterdam, South Holland, Netherlands to New York, United States.
Stephanino	Italy	The barque ran aground at Queenstown, County Cork, United Kingdom. She was refloated.

== 26 February ==
List of shipwrecks: 26 February 1878
Ship	State	Description
Eliza Cornish	United Kingdom	The brigantine ran aground on the Shoebury Sand, in the Thames Estuary. She was refloated.
Faith	(United Kingdom of Great Britain and Ireland) Guernsey	The brig ran aground on the Shoebury Sand. She was on a voyage from Northfleet, Kent to Newcastle upon Tyne, Northumberland.
Fife	United Kingdom	The steamship was driven ashore in the Seine. She was on a voyage from Glasgow, Renfrewshire to Rouen, Seine-Inférieure, France.
Hilda	United Kingdom	The brig ran aground on the Shoebury Sand, in the Thames Estuary. She was on a voyage from Grangemouth, Stirlingshire to London.
Providence	France	The schooner ran aground on the Wielingen Sandbank, in the North Sea off the coast of West Flanders, Belgium and sank. Her crew were rescued. She was on a voyage from "Requejada" to Antwerp, Belgium.

== 27 February ==
List of shipwrecks: 27 February 1878
Ship	State	Description
Blossom	United Kingdom	The schooner was wrecked at Cruden Bay, Aberdeenshire. Her three crew were rescued by the Cruden Bay Lifeboat Peep o' Day ( Royal National Lifeboat Institution).
Lauretta	Canada	The brig collided with the steamship City of New York (United Kingdom) and was abandoned off the Tuskar Rock with the loss of a crew member. Lauretta was on a voyage from Paraíba, Brazil to Liverpool, Lancashire, United Kingdom. She was towed in to Holyhead, Anglesey in a waterlogged condition by the tug King Fisher (United Kingdom) on 2 March.
Marie	Denmark	The schooner ran aground at "Skomader Grund". She was on a voyage from Newcastle upon Tyne, Northumberland, United Kingdom to Horsens.

== 28 February ==
List of shipwrecks: 28 February 1878
Ship	State	Description
Cashier	Canada	The ship ran aground at Harwich, Essex, United Kingdom. She was on a voyage from Windsor, Nova Scotia to Ipswich, Suffolk, United Kingdom. She was refloated.
Emanuele	Italy	The ship was wrecked at Genoa. She was on a voyage from Jijel, Algeria to La Spezia.
La Fontaine	France	The ship was wrecked near Rangoon, Burma. She was on a voyage from Hyères, Var to Rangoon.
Leonora	Belgium	The barque was abandoned in the Atlantic Ocean. Her crew were rescued by the barque Soflid (Norway). Leonora was on a voyage from New York, United States to Liverpool, Lancashire, United Kingdom.
Swinemünde	Germany	The barque was driven ashore and wrecked at Selsey, Sussex, United Kingdom. Her ten crew were rescued by the Selsey Lifeboat. She was on a voyage from Pillau to Falmouth, Cornwall, United Kingdom.
Torca	United Kingdom	The steamship ran aground on the Jordan Bank, in Liverpool Bay. She was on a voyage from Garston, Lancashire to Dublin. She was refloated and resumed her voyage.
Velindra	United Kingdom	The steamship ran aground in the River Avon downstream of Sea Mills, Gloucestershire. She was on a voyage from Bristol, Gloucestershire to Padstow, Cornwall.

== Unknown date ==
List of shipwrecks: Unknown date in February 1878
Ship	State	Description
Blanche	United Kingdom	The brig foundered at sea. Nine of her ten crew were rescued by an American schooner, the tenth was reported missing.
Claudina	United Kingdom	The barque foundered off the west coast of the United States with the loss of all hands.
Columbia	Norway	The ship was abandoned at sea before 27 February.
Flower of Banff	United Kingdom	The schooner was wrecked on the Silloth Bank, in the Irish Sea off the coast of Cumberland. Her crew survived. She was on a voyage from Casablanca, Morocco to Silloth, Cumberland.
Guiseppe Massone	Italy	The barque was driven ashore and wrecked at Cape Henry, Virginia, United States. She was on a voyage from Belfast, County Antrim, United Kingdom to Baltimore, Maryland, United States.
Jennie Sweeney	United States	The ship was driven ashore on "Watompkin Island". She was on a voyage from Galveston, Texas to Philadelphia, Pennsylvania. She had been refloated by 11 February and taken in tow.
Kianchang	China	The steamship was driven ashore and wrecked at Hankou.
La Baptistine	France	The ship was driven ashore at "Faraman". She was on a voyage from Larache, Morocco to Marseille, Bouches-du-Rhône. She was refloated and taken in to "Havre".
La Belle	United States	The steamship sank at the mouth of the Red River of the South.
La Fontaine	United Kingdom	The ship was wrecked near Rangoon, Burma. She was on a voyage from Hyères, Var to Rangoon.
Madone	France	The ship was wrecked on the Turneffe Atoll.
Maggie Armstrong	United Kingdom	The ship was driven ashore at Porto Torres, Sardinia, Italy. Her crew survived. She was on a voyage from Nice, Alpes-Maritimes, France to Faro, Portugal.
Malta	United Kingdom	The barque was driven ashore and wrecked on Bermuda before 16 February. She was on a voyage from Ardrossan, Ayrshire to the Delaware Breakwater, United States.
Martha Jane	United Kingdom	The ship was driven ashore and wrecked at Mobile, Alabama, United States. She was on a voyage from Queenstown, County Cork to Mobile.
Mary Ella	United States	The ship was abandoned in the Atlantic Ocean before 24 February.
Olaf Trygveson	Norway	The steamship ran aground on the Kalosand. She was refloated and taken in to Tromsø.
Olinka	United Kingdom	The ship was wrecked on the Kish Bank, in the Irish Sea off the coast of County Dublin before 18 February.
Telegraph	New Zealand	The 15-ton cutter stranded at the entrance to Kaipara Harbour during bad weather, and broke up. All crew survived.
Terrible	Regia Marina	The frigate ran aground near Thessaloniki, Greece before 14 February. She was refloated.
Union	Austria-Hungary	The barque was wrecked in the Cayman Islands. Her crew were rescued. She was on a voyage from Martinique to New Orleans, Louisiana, United States.
Universe	United States	The ship was abandoned at sea before 18 February with some loss of life. She was on a voyage from Antwerp, Belgium to Philadelphia.
Vanadis	Sweden	The ship was driven ashore. She was on a voyage from Java, Netherlands East Indies to the English Channel. She was refloated and taken in to "Panarookun", Netherlands East Indies.
Unnamed	Greece	The brig ran aground near Algeciras, Spain. She was refloated.
