= Dwain =

Dwain is a masculine given name. Notable people with the name include:

First names:

- Dwain Anderson
- Dwain Chambers
- Dwain Esper
- Dwain Lingenfelter
- Dwain Sloat
- Dwain Weston

Middle names:

- Anthony Dwain Lee
- Dan Dwain Schoonover
- David Dwain Phelps
- Demorrio Dwain Williams
- Edward Dwain (Ike) Brookens
- Michael Dwain Gallo

== See also ==
- Dewayne
- Duane (disambiguation)
- Dwaine
- Dwane
- Dwayne
