= Dwayne Benjamin =

Dwayne Benjamin may refer to:

- Dwayne Benjamin (basketball) (born 1993), American professional basketball player
- Dwayne Benjamin (economist) (born 1961), Canadian economist
