= Dwayne King =

Dwayne or Duane King may refer to:

- D. J. King, Canadian ice hockey player
- Dwayne King, character in 30 Minutes or Less
- Dwayne A. King, American politician and businessman
- Duane H. King, American scholar of Native American topics
