= Duane Jones (disambiguation) =

Duane Jones is an actor.

Duane Jones may also refer to:

- Duane Jones (The Walking Dead)
- Duane Jones (snooker player) (born 1993)

== See also ==
- Dwayne Jones (disambiguation)
