= Slade Castle =

- Caisleán an tSlaoid (Irish)
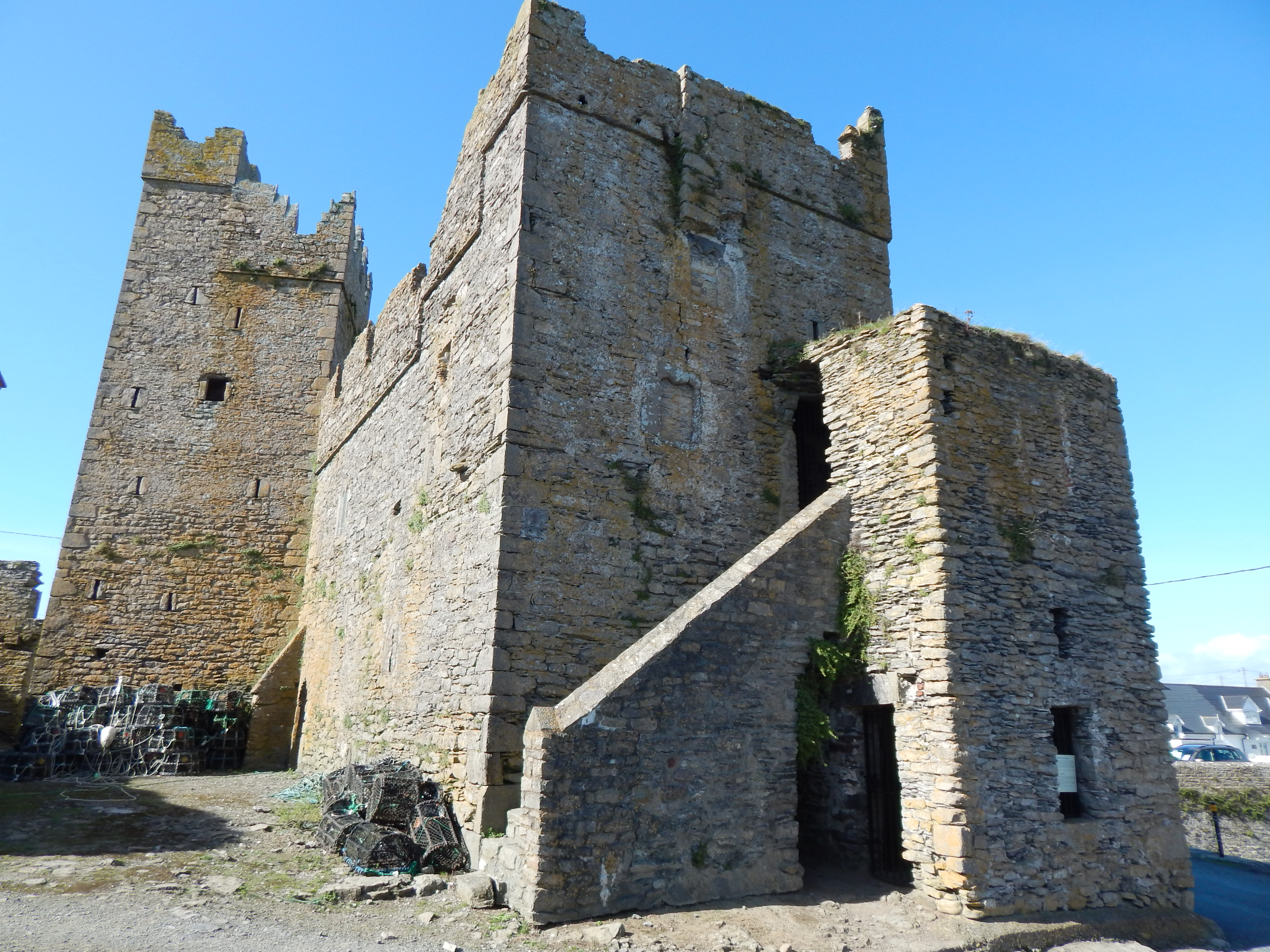

- Location within Ireland
- 52.13387°N 6.91071°W
- Type: tower house
- Location: Slade, Hook Peninsula, County Wexford, Ireland

History
- Built: early 16th century

Site notes
- Height: 17 m (56 ft)
- Area: Hook Peninsula
- Owner: State

National monument of Ireland
- Official name: Slade Castle
- Reference no.: 429

Slade Castle is a tower house and National Monument in County Wexford, Ireland. It is located in the village of Slade on the Hook Peninsula and primarily dates to the late 15th or early 16th century.

== Location ==
Slade Castle is located in the village of Slade, near the tip of the Hook Peninsula, 1.7 km (1.1 mi) northeast of Hook Head Lighthouse.

== History ==
The original fort was built by the Laffin (Laffan) family in the late 15th century. The fortified two-storied hall was added in the 16th century also adding crenellations. The Laffin estate was quite small, 86 ha (210 acres). This suggests that other sources of revenue, such as fishing or trade, must have funded the castle.

The Laffins lost Slade after the 1641 Rebellion. It was used for storage by the salt works until the 19th century, when that the castle was converted into tenement housing. When the castle was taken over by the Office of Public Works in the 1940s, the castle was restored to its previous condition.

== Building ==
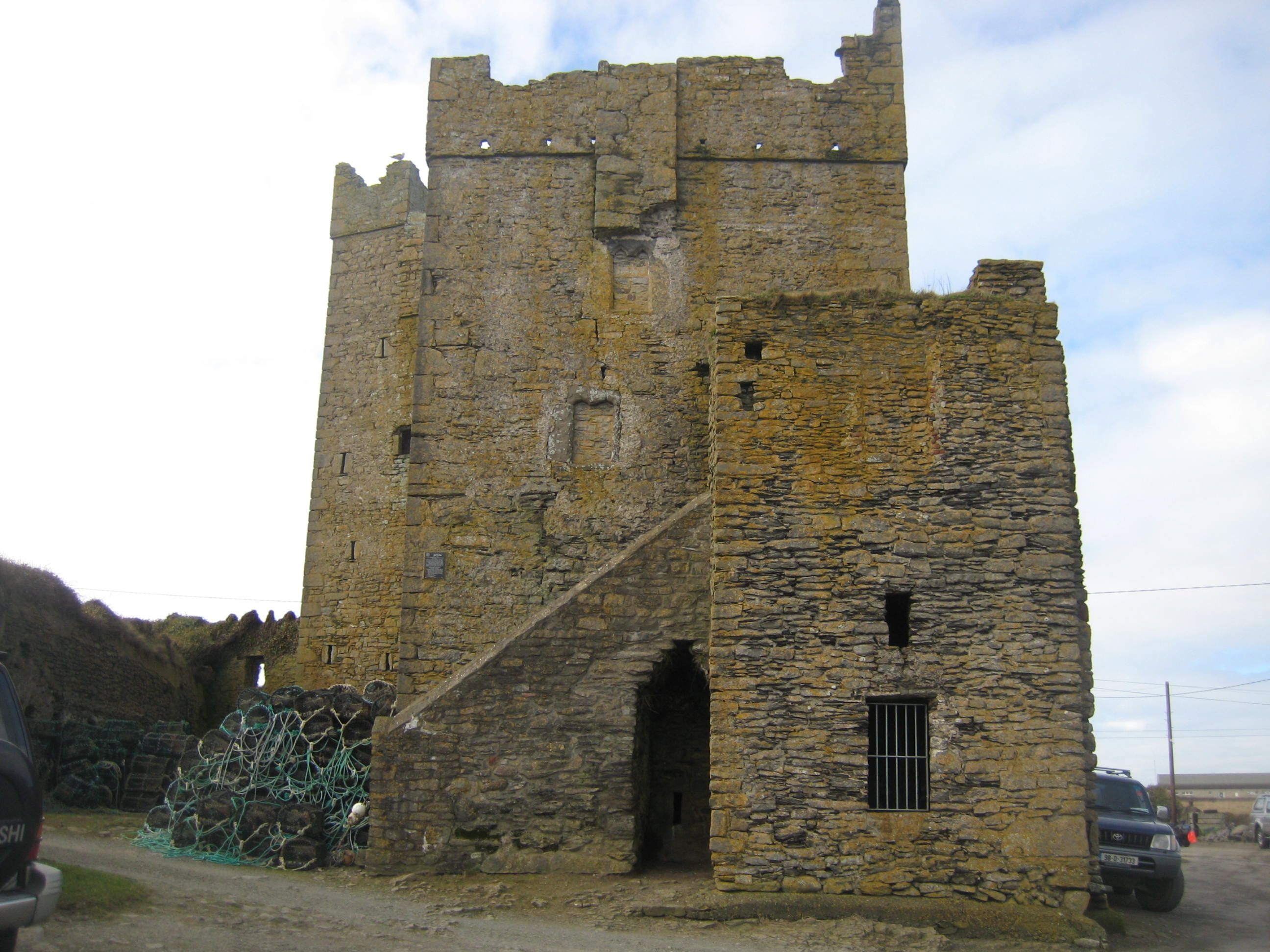
Another view of the castle, with many arrowslits.

The earliest part of the castle is the four-storey tower. The ground and third floors have vaulted ceilings, with Irish crenelations on the parapet, from which there are views of Bannow Bay and Waterford Harbour, important for defence. The entrance doorway is protected by a machicolation and murder-hole. A fireplace and garderobe survive on the second level. The three ground-floor rooms cannot be entered from the living quarters above and may have been used as warehouses.

The hall is two storeys tall, and its entrance is protected by a murder-hole. There is a large fireplace at the west end and an oubliette in the south wall. A mural staircase leads to the upper floor.
