= USNS PFC Dewayne T. Williams =

2nd Lt. John P. Bobo-class cargo ship

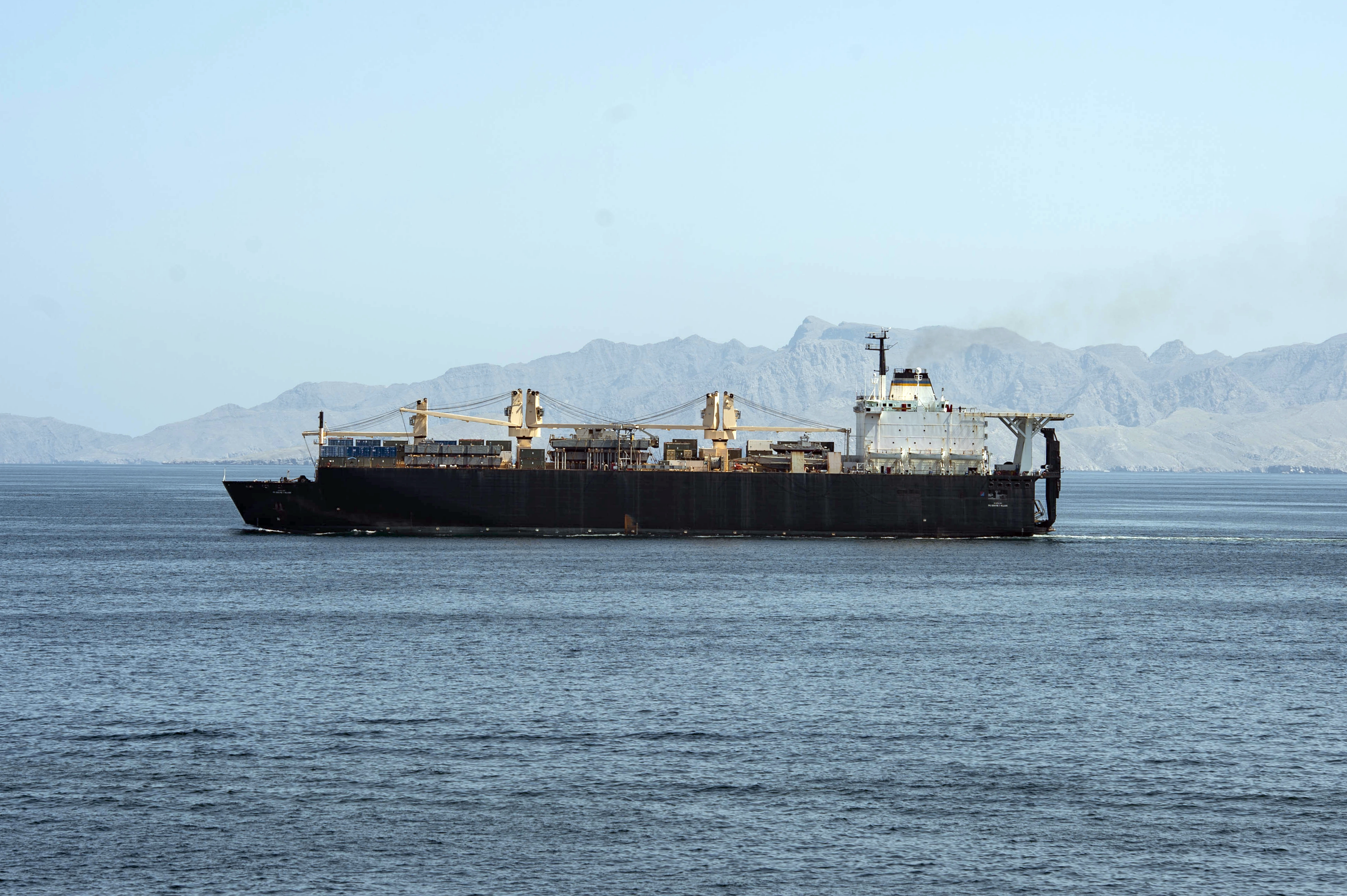
- USNS PFC Dewayne T. Williams

History

United States
- Name: PFC Dewayne T. Williams
- Namesake: Dewayne T. Williams
- Owner: Military Sealift Command
- Operator: American Overseas Marine (1985–2006); Military Sealift Command (2006–present)
- Builder: Fore River Shipyard
- Laid down: September 1983
- Launched: May 1985
- Acquired: June 1985
- Reclassified: from AK-3009, 2006
- Home port: Diego Garcia
- Identification: IMO number: 8219396; MMSI number: 367371000; Callsign: NHNU
- Status: Active

General characteristics
- Class & type: 2nd Lt. John P. Bobo-class dry cargo ship
- Displacement: 44,330 t (43,630 long tons), full
- Length: 672 ft 6 in (204.98 m)
- Beam: 106 ft 0 in (32.31 m)
- Draft: 29 ft 5 in (8.97 m)
- Installed power: 1 × shaft; 27,000 hp (20,000 kW)
- Propulsion: 2 × Werkspoor 16TM410 diesel engines
- Speed: 18 knots (33 km/h; 21 mph)
- Capacity: 162,500 sq. ft. vehicle; 1,605,000 gallons petroleum; 81,700 gallons water; 522 TEU
- Complement: 55 mariners
- Aircraft carried: 1 × Sikorsky CH-53E
- Aviation facilities: Helipad

USNS PFC Dewayne T. Williams (T-AK-3009), formerly MV PFC Dewayne T. Williams (AK-3009), is the second ship of the 2nd Lt. John P. Bobo-class cargo ship and one of the maritime prepositioning ships of the US Navy. She is named after Medal of Honor recipient and US Marine Dewayne T. Williams.

== Construction and career ==
She was built by General Dynamics Quincy Shipbuilding Division, Quincy, Massachusetts, and acquired by the Navy under a long-term charter from 6 June 1985. The navy placed her under the direction of the Military Sealift Command as MV PFC Dewayne T. Williams (AK-3009), and assigned to be operated by American Overseas Marine Corporation.

She was purchased outright by Military Sealift Command on 17 January 2006, and was redesignated USNS PFC Dewayne T. Williams (T-AK-3009). She was one of the ships assigned to Maritime Prepositioning Program Squadron 1 under the operational control of MSC Europe, operating in the Mediterranean.

== Gallery ==
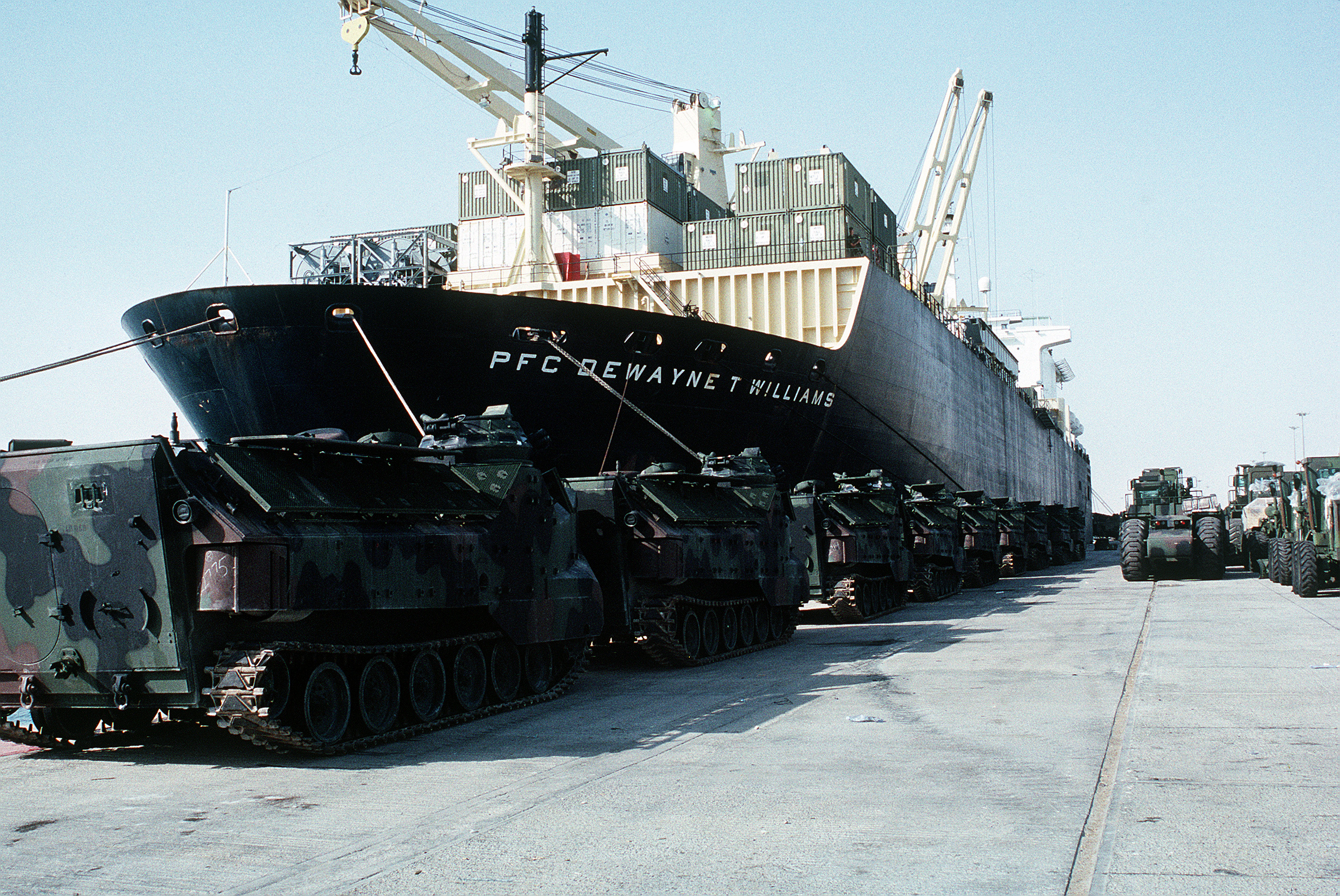
PFC Dewayne T. Williams during Operation Desert Shield in 1990

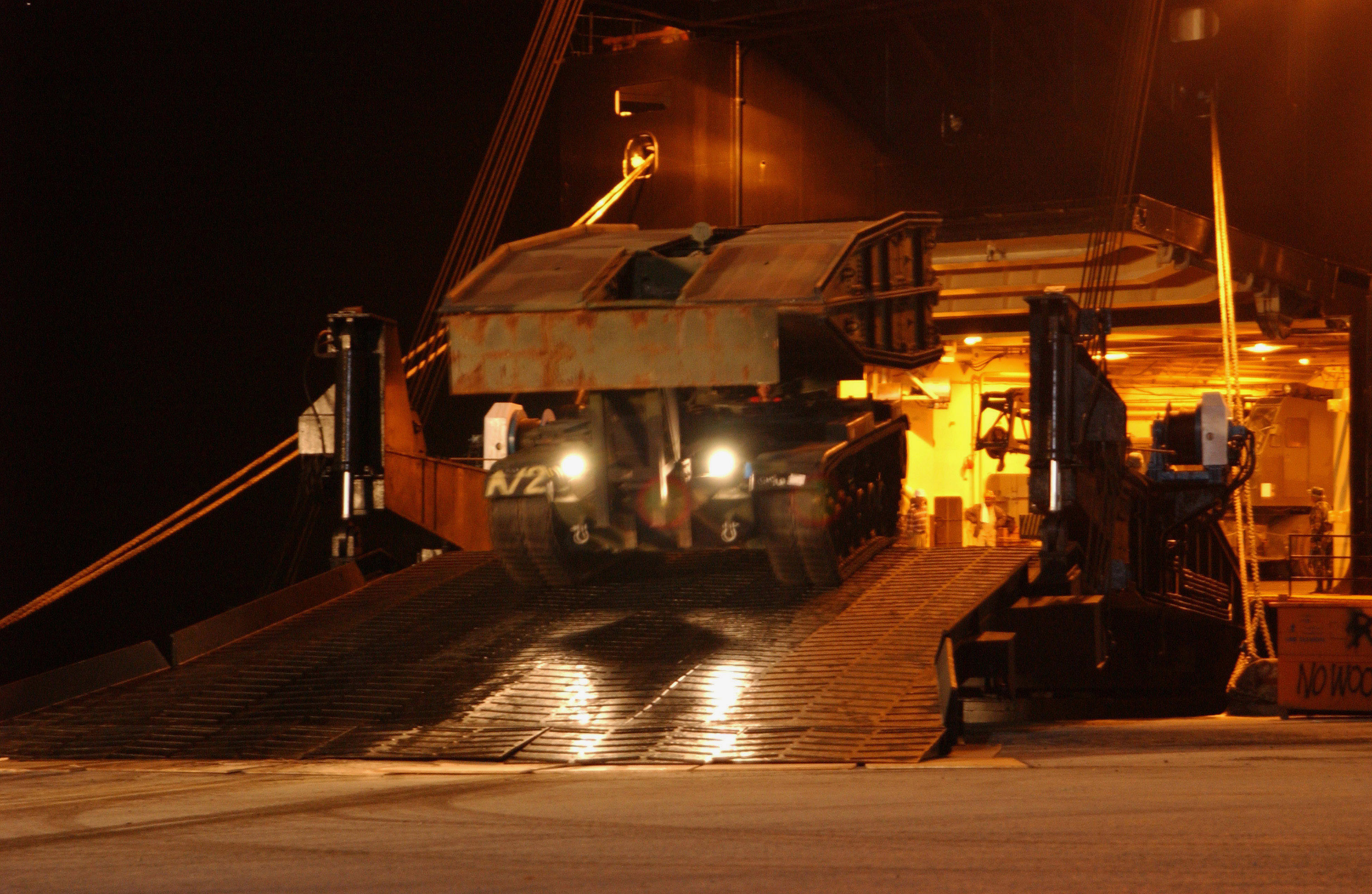
PFC Dewayne T. Williams during Operation Iraqi Freedom on 19 February 2004

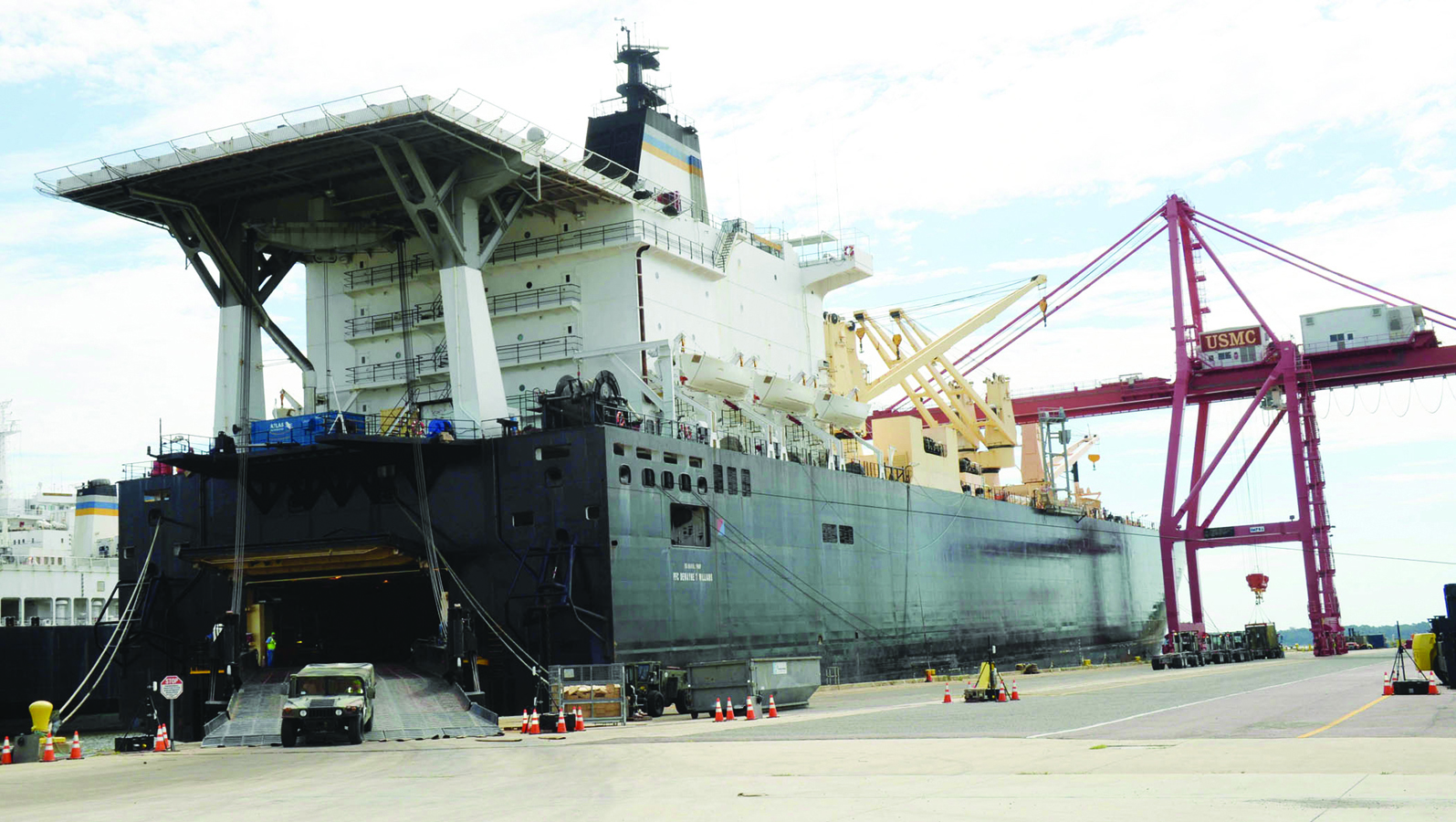
Stern view of PFC Dewayne T. Williams on 18 September 2014
