= Ireland's Ancient East =

Irish tourist route

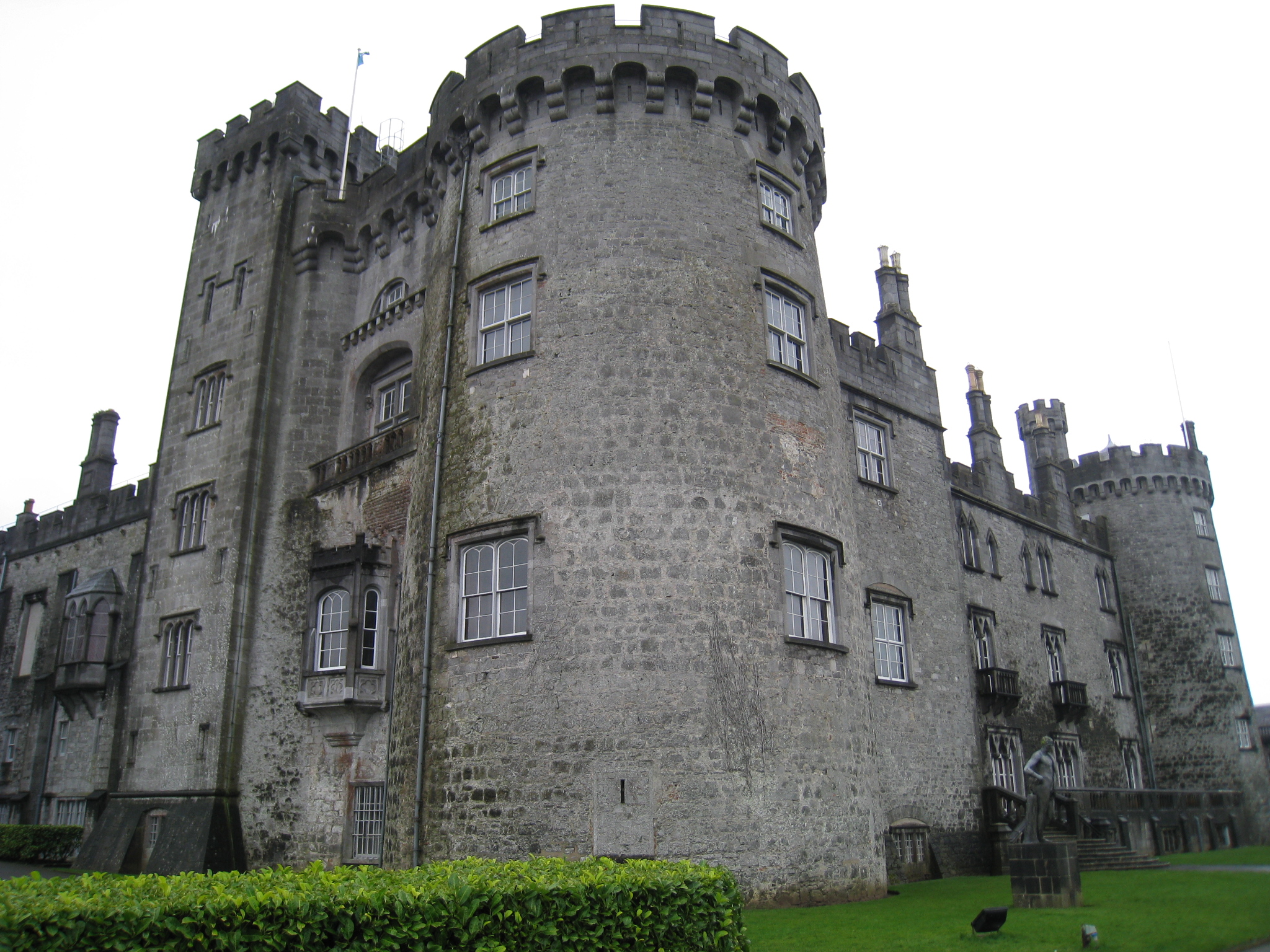
Kilkenny Castle, County Kilkenny

Signature Discovery Point

Ireland's Ancient East (Irish: Sean-Oirthear na hÉireann) is a destination marketing brand representing the east coast, and parts of the midlands and south coasts, of Ireland. Unlike the Wild Atlantic Way, the region's tourism trail doesn't have a set driving route, and instead seeks to connect various sights throughout seventeen counties in two provinces. The concept is built around four "pillars": Ancient Ireland, Early Christian Ireland, Medieval Ireland and Anglo Ireland.

Bus Éireann promotes various routes that pass through, or near, landmarks on the trail.

== Themes ==
=== Historic Heartland ===
The "Historic Heartland" includes a number of sites in counties Offaly, Laois, Kildare, Tipperary, Limerick, Carlow, and Kilkenny, including:

- Clonmacnoise
- Kilkenny Castle
- Leixlip
- Limerick
- Maynooth
- Rock of Cashel
- Tipperary (town)

=== Land of 5000 Dawns ===
The "Land of 5000 Dawns" includes a number of sites in counties Cavan, Longford, Louth, Meath, Monaghan, and Westmeath, including:

- Athlone
- Battle of the Boyne site
- Brú na Bóinne
- Dowth
- Hill of Tara
- Kilbeggan Distillery
- Newgrange

=== Celtic Coast ===
The "Celtic Coast" includes parts of counties Wicklow, Wexford, Waterford, and Eastern County Cork, including:

- Blarney Castle
- Cobh
- Enniscorthy
- Glendalough
- Hook Head
- Waterford
- Wexford

== See also ==
- List of tourist attractions in Ireland
