= Hook Peninsula =

Peninsula in County Wexford, Ireland

Coordinates: 52.134286°N 6.919463°W

Rinn Duáin
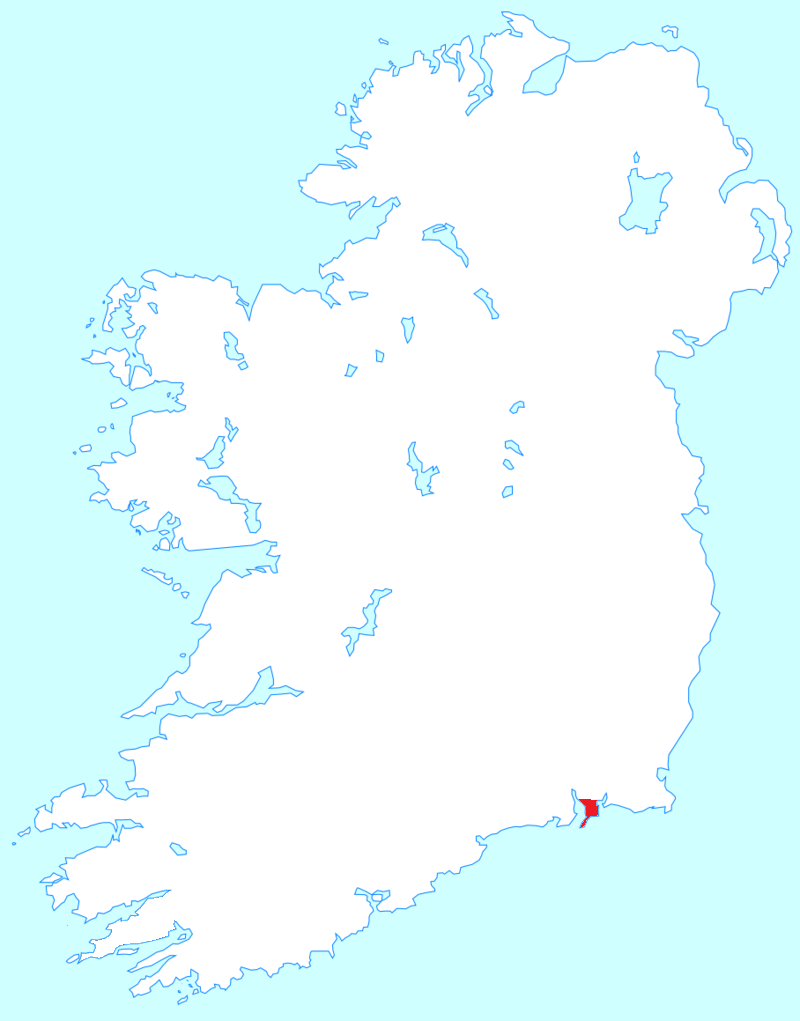
- Location of the Hook Peninsula
- Interactive map of Hook Peninsula

Geography
- Location: Ireland
- Adjacent to: Atlantic Ocean; Celtic Sea
- Area: 60 km^{2} (23 sq mi)

Administration
- Ireland
- County: Wexford

The Hook Peninsula is a peninsula in County Wexford, Ireland. It has been a gateway to south-east Ireland for successive waves of invaders, including the Vikings, Anglo-Normans and the English.

The coastline has a number of beaches. The peninsula's fishing villages, bird watching on the mudflats of Bannow Estuary, deep sea angling, snorkeling and swimming are part of the area's maritime life. The area's rivers, valleys, estuaries and hills have long provided south-west Wexford with rich grazing land.

== See also ==
- Hook Head, headland on the peninsula
- Hook Lighthouse, at the tip of the peninsula
- Fethard-on-Sea, a village
- Duncannon, a village
- Loftus Hall, a country house
- Slade, a village overlooked by Slade Castle
