= Dubhán =

5th-century Brittonic priest and saint

Dubhán was a 5th-century Brittonic priest and pilgrim, for whom Hook Head (originally Rinn Dubháin) is named.

The name is from Old Irish Dubán meaning "little dark one", derived from dub "dark, black" combined with a diminutive suffix. It was also the name of a few early saints.

== Hagiography ==
According to tradition, Dubhán came from Wales to Ireland in 452 AD along with a group of his followers. Numerous legends relate the man to be the founder of a number of medieval signal-fire lighthouses, such as Hook Lighthouse on Rinn Dubhain in Wexford. Rinn Dubháin, (Dubhán's point), is named for him (literally "little black [haired] one"). Dubhán also means "fishing hook" and that is how it was translated by the Normans.

Antiquarian and historian John Francis Shearman agrees that Dubhán came from Wales and identifies him with Saint Dyfnan, who in the Book of Leinster, is listed as one of the many sons of the Welsh king Brychan. As Dyfnan is reputed to be buried on Anglesey, Shearman speculates that Dubhán must have at some point retired to his home country.

Dubhán was the founder of the church of Killooaun or Cill Dhubháin ('the church of Dubhán'), Ballymacward, County Galway. All that now exists of the church are ruins, but it was once the centre of a medieval vicarage. It has been suggested that it belonged to a period later than that of Killamude. While a number of saints of his name are listed in various martyrologies, none can be connected with Dubhán of Killooaun.

He is remembered in various Waterford place names such as Kilduane Cill Dubháin– "Duane's church, and Ballydwan Baile Uí Dhubháin – "Duane's Homestead."

== General and cited references ==
- Mannion, Joseph (2004). The Life, Legends and Legacy of Saint Kerrill: A Fifth-Century East Galway Evangelist. ISBN 0954769813.
