= Dewayne T. Williams =

United States marine (1949–1968)

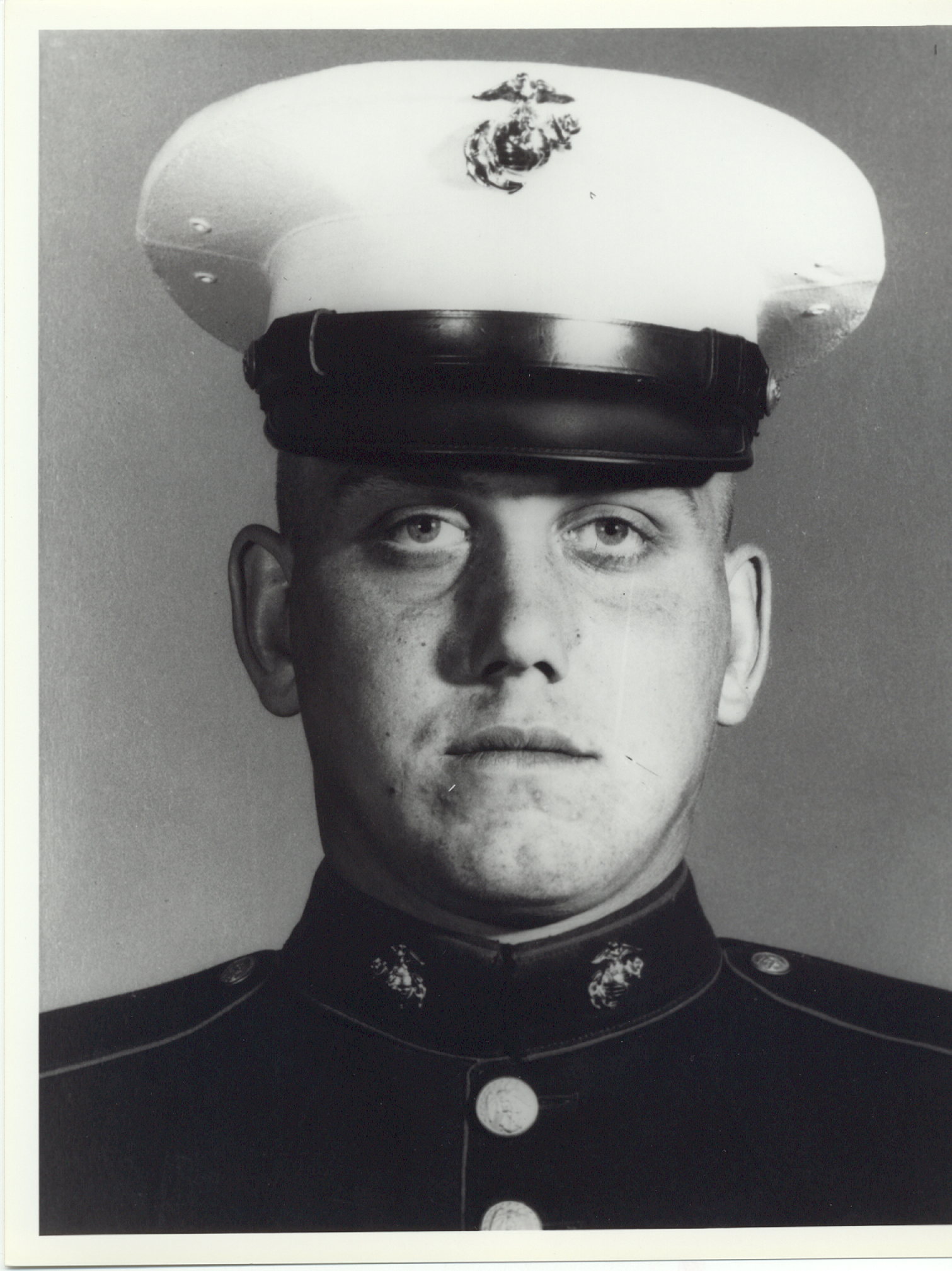
- Dewayne Thomas Williams, Medal of Honor recipient
- Born: September 18, 1949; Brown City, Michigan, U.S.
- Died: September 18, 1968 (aged 19); Quảng Nam Province, Republic of Vietnam
- Burial place: Saint Mary’s Cemetery, Saint Clair, Michigan
- Military career
- Allegiance: United States of America
- Branch: United States Marine Corps
- Service years: 1967–1968
- Rank: Private First Class
- Nickname: DTW
- Units: Company H, 2nd Battalion 1st Marines, 1st Marine Division
- Conflicts: Vietnam War †
- Awards: Medal of Honor; Purple Heart
- Other work: N/A

Private First Class Dewayne Thomas Williams (September 18, 1949 – September 18, 1968) was a United States Marine who posthumously received the Medal of Honor for heroism in the Vietnam War in September 1968.

On September 18, 1968, Williams's 19th birthday, his unit participated in a patrol to destroy enemy sniper positions in Quang Nam Province. Suddenly, Williams's unit was ambushed by North Vietnamese forces. Williams was wounded early in the skirmish, but still attempted to fire back at the enemies. When a grenade came close to another Marine, Williams jumped onto it, sacrificing himself.

== Biography ==
Dewayne Williams was born on September 18, 1949, in Brown City, Michigan. He attended Bell Elementary School, St. Clair Elementary, Intermediate, and High Schools in St. Clair, Michigan, and Capac High School, in Capac, Michigan.

On December 18, 1967, Williams enlisted in the Marine Corps Reserve, and was discharged to enlist in the active Marine Corps on January 2, 1968. He completed recruit training with the 3rd Recruit Training Battalion, Marine Corps Recruit Depot San Diego in March 1968; individual combat training with Company Y, 3rd Battalion, 2nd Infantry Training Regiment, Marine Corps Base Camp Pendleton, in April; and weapons training with Weapons Company, Basic Infantry Training Battalion, 2nd Infantry Training Regiment at Camp Pendleton, in May 1968.

Williams was promoted to private first class on June 1, 1968. Upon his arrival in the Republic of Vietnam later that month, he was assigned duty as automatic rifleman with Company I, 3rd Battalion, 27th Marines, 1st Marine Division, and served in this capacity until August 1968. He was then assigned duty as anti-tank assault man with Company H, 2nd Battalion 1st Marines. On September 18, 1968, he was killed in action while on patrol in the Quảng Nam Province.

== Awards and honors ==
Williams awards include:

| Medal of Honor | | Purple Heart |
| National Defense Service Medal | Vietnam Service Medal w/ 2 service stars | Vietnam Campaign Medal |

- The Military Sealift Command maritime Prepositioning ship, USNS PFC Dewayne T. Williams (T-AK-3009), is named in his honor.
- Dewayne T. Williams's name can be found inscribed on Vietnam Veterans Memorial on Panel 43W, Row 025.
- The portion of Interstate 69 beginning at the eastern city limit of the city of Lapeer, Michigan and extending east to the western city limit of the city of Port Huron, Michigan is known as the "DeWayne T. Williams Memorial Highway".

=== Medal of Honor citation ===
The President of the United States in the name of the Congress takes pride in presenting the MEDAL OF HONOR posthumously to

PRIVATE FIRST CLASS DEWAYNE T. WILLIAMS
UNITED STATES MARINE CORPS

for service as set forth in the following CITATION:

For conspicuous gallantry and intrepidity at the risk of his life above and beyond the call of duty while serving as a Rifleman with the First Platoon, Company H, Second Battalion, First Marines, First Marine Division in action against communist insurgent forces in the Quang Nam Province, Republic of Vietnam. Private First Class Williams was a member of a combat patrol sent out from the platoon with the mission of establishing positions in the company's area of operations, from which it could intercept and destroy enemy sniper teams operating in the area. On the night of September 18, 1968, as the patrol was preparing to move from its daylight position to a preselected night position, it was attacked from ambush by a squad of enemy using small arms and hand grenades. Although severely wounded in the back by the close intense fire, Private First Class Williams, recognizing the danger to the patrol, immediately began to crawl forward toward a good firing position. While he was moving under the continuing intense fire, he heard one of the members of the patrol sound the alert that an enemy grenade had landed in their position. Reacting instantly to the alert, he saw that the grenade had landed close to where he was lying and without hesitation, in a valiant act of heroism, he rolled on top of the grenade as it exploded, absorbing the full and tremendous impact of the explosion with his own body. Through his extraordinary initiative and inspiring valor in the face of certain death, he saved the other members of his patrol from serious injury and possible loss of life, and enabled them to successfully defeat the attackers and hold their position until assistance arrived. His personal heroism and devotion to duty upheld the highest traditions of the Marine Corps and the United States Naval Service. He gallantly gave his life for his country.

RICHARD M. NIXON

== See also ==
- List of Medal of Honor recipients
  - List of Medal of Honor recipients for the Vietnam War
