= Dwayne Washington =

Dwayne Washington may refer to:

- Dwayne Washington (American football), NFL running back
- Dwayne Washington (basketball), NBA point guard

== See also ==
- Dewayne Washington (born 1972), NFL cornerback
- Duane Washington (born 1964), American basketball player
- Duane Washington Jr. (born 2000), American basketball player
