= Dwane Lee =

Footballer (born 1979)

Personal information
- Full name: Dwane Anthony Lee
- Date of birth: 26 November 1979 (age 46)
- Place of birth: Hillingdon, Greater London, England
- Position: Midfielder

Senior career*
Years	Team	Apps	(Gls)
1998–2003	Yeading	70	(6)
2002	→ Aldershot Town (loan)	3	(0)
2003–2004	Exeter City	21	(3)
2004	→ Yeading (loan)	1	(0)
2004–2006	Barnet	64	(8)
2006	Kidderminster Harriers	5	(0)
2006	Stevenage Borough	12	(1)
2006–2008	Maidenhead United	58	(13)
2008	Kettering Town	2	(0)
2008	Halesowen Town	5	(0)
2008–2009	AFC Wimbledon	18	(0)
2009	Bromley	6	(0)
2010	Boreham Wood	1	(0)
2011	Windsor & Eton	5	(0)
2011	Staines Town		
2011	Lewes	7	(0)
2011–2012	Hayes & Yeading United	19	(0)
2012	Beaconsfield SYCOB		
2012–2013	Burnham	15	(1)

International career
2004	Grenada	2	(0)

Managerial career
- 2019: London Tigers
- * Club domestic league appearances and goals

Dwane Anthony Lee (born 26 November 1979) is a former footballer who played as a midfielder. Born in England, he made two appearances for the Grenada national team at international level.

== Club career ==
Lee was born in Hillingdon, Greater London. He began his career at Yeading and was loaned out to Aldershot Town for one-month, in November 2002, before moving to Exeter City in July 2003. After a season, Lee moved to Barnet, where he played over 50 games and won a Conference National championship medal. After half a season in the Football League, Lee returned to the Conference with Kidderminster Harriers, and then Stevenage Borough, before a spell with Maidenhead United. In May 2008, he became the first summer signing for newly promoted Conference side Kettering Town.

On 2 December 2008, he joined AFC Wimbledon after his contract was cancelled by mutual consent at Kettering in November, going straight into the starting XI for their game against Eastleigh. He then joined Bromley in August 2009, but was released after only seven appearances (six league, one FA Cup). In March 2010, he joined Boreham Wood. In August 2011, Lee signed for Lewes in the Isthmian League. Lee moved to Hayes & Yeading United in October of the same year. Lee managed the Hayes & Yeading United F.C. U23 Team. In 2019 he briefly managed London Tigers.

== Honours ==
Barnet

- Conference National: 2005

AFC Wimbledon

- Conference South: 2008

Burnham

- Southern Football League Division One Central: 2013
