= Slade, County Wexford =

Townland in County Wexford, Ireland

Slade An Slaod
- Townland
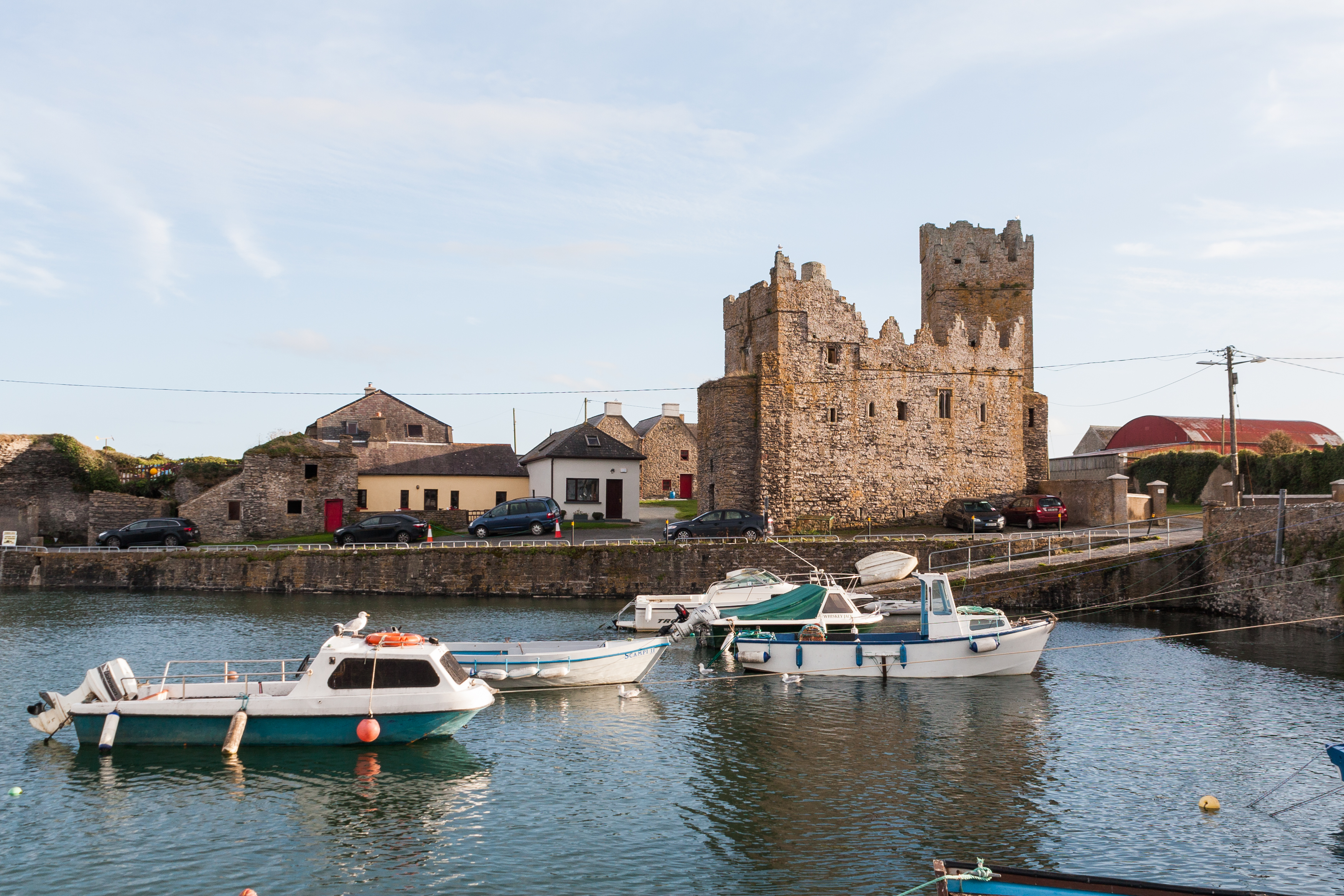
- Slade's harbour and castle

- Location in Ireland
- Coordinates: 52°08′02″N 6°54′40″W
- Country: Ireland
- Province: Leinster
- County: Wexford
- Irish grid reference: X746985

Slade (Irish: An Slaod) is a small village and townland in County Wexford, Ireland. The townland, which has an area of approximately 1 square kilometre (0.4 sq mi), sits on the Hook Peninsula and had a population of 52 people as of the 2011 census. Slade has historically been a fishing port, and was defended by Slade Castle from the late 15th century. In the south of the townland, there is evidence of an earlier ringfort. The harbour in Slade village was extended in the mid-19th century and built upon piers dating from at least the 17th century. A salt-house was built here in the 17th century, to salt (preserve) the fish landed in the harbour. There is a small beach next to the harbour, and Hook Sub Aqua Club (a scuba diving club) is based nearby.
