= Hook Lighthouse =

Lighthouse in County Wexford, Ireland

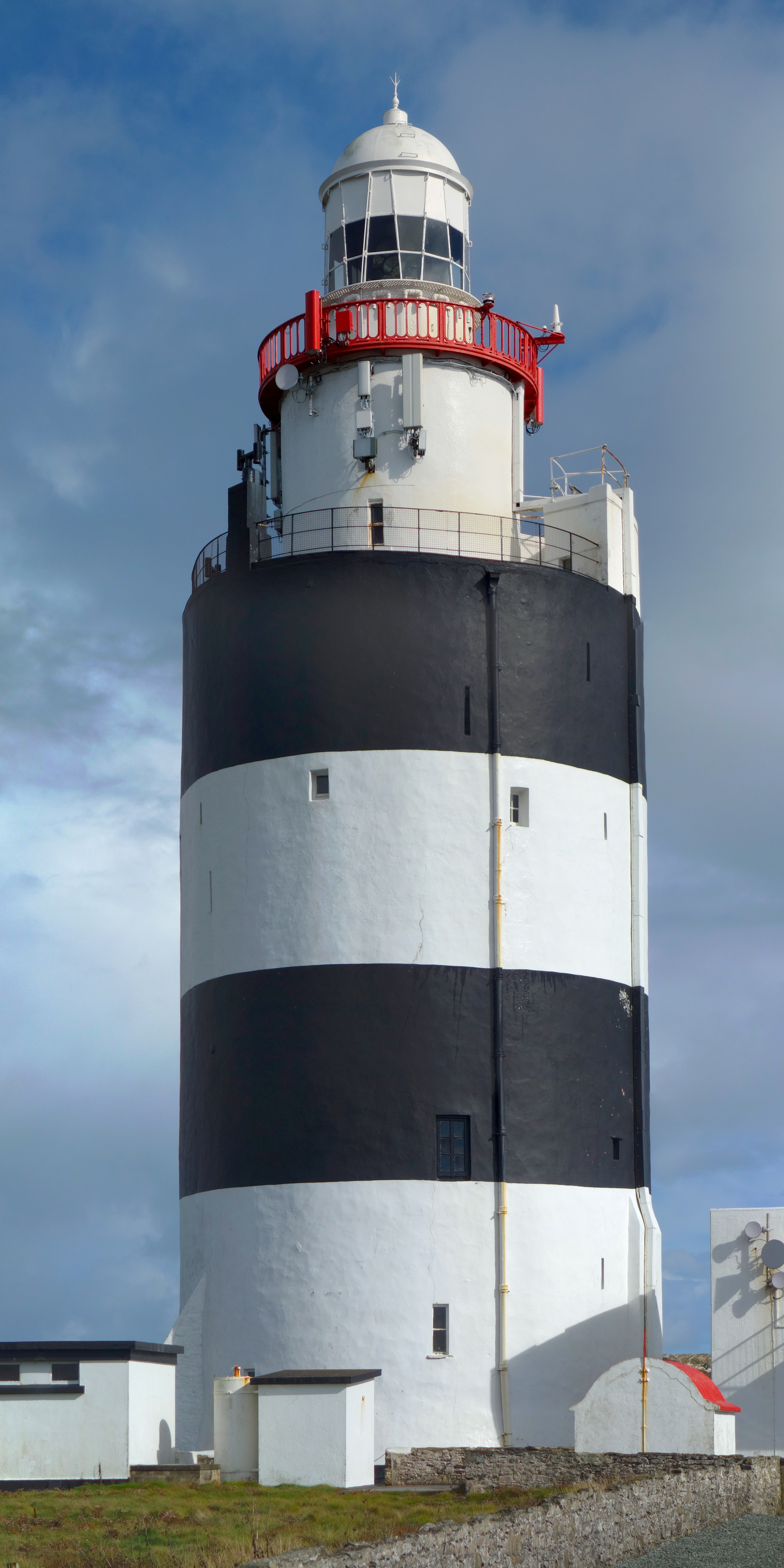
- Hook Head Lighthouse, which was built approximately 800 years ago.
- Location: County Wexford, Ireland
- Coordinates: 52°7′25.7″N 6°55′45.5″W

Tower
- Constructed: 1172
- Construction: limestone tower
- Automated: 1996
- Height: 35 metres (115 ft)
- Shape: broad cylindrical tower with double balcony and lantern
- Markings: white tower with two black bands
- Operator: Hook Heritage Ltd.
- Racon: K

Light
- Focal height: 47 metres (154 ft)
- Lens: third order Fresnel lens
- Range: 23 nautical miles (43 km; 26 mi)
- Characteristic: Fl W 3s.
- Ireland no.: CIL-0380

The Hook Lighthouse (Irish: Teach Solais Rinn Duáin; also known as Hook Head Lighthouse) is a building situated on Hook Head at the tip of the Hook Peninsula in County Wexford, in Ireland. It is one of the oldest lighthouses in the world and the second oldest operating lighthouse in the world, after the Tower of Hercules in Spain. It is operated by the Commissioners of Irish Lights, the Irish lighthouse authority, and marks the eastern entrance to Waterford Harbour. The current structure has stood for over 800 years.

== History ==
The Hook Lighthouse appears on the coat of arms of County Wexford.

The existing tower dates from the 12th century, though tradition states that Dubhán, a missionary to the Wexford area, established a form of beacon as early as the 5th century. The headland is known in Irish as Rinn Dubháin, St. Dubhán's Head. However, the similar-sounding Irish word 'duán' means a fish hook, hence the English name. It is known locally as "the Hook."

The tower was built by Strongbow's son-in-law William Marshall, Earl of Pembroke, who succeeded Strongbow as Lord of Leinster. Pembroke had established a port in the town of New Ross, approx. 30 km up river. In order for his new port to be successful and for ships to safely reach their destination, Pembroke had a 36m high tower built at the mouth of Waterford Harbour. The exact year of construction is not known, but Pembroke first came to the region in 1201 and the first map that shows the lighthouse serving its function is dated 1240, so construction must have taken place between these dates.

The first custodians of the light were a small group of monks whose small monastery was situated on the peninsula. The monks who lived at this monastery would have lit warning fires and beacons all through the years to warn sailors of the dangerous rocks on the peninsula. It was the monks who lived at this monastery in the 13th century who became the first light-keepers. They are also thought to have helped in the construction of the tower.

Hook Lighthouse is one of the most fascinating examples of medieval architecture in Ireland. The tower stands four stories high with walls up to 4m thick. The tower itself consists of three rib-vaulted chambers in the lower tier, while the upper, narrower section would have carried the warning beacon. These two tiers are connected by a mural (within the wall) stairway of 115 steps. The tower was constructed of local limestone and the original building survives intact. The first tier is 13m in diameter at the base and has three storeys, each with its original 13th-century stone fireplace. In the thickness of the wall, there are a number of mural chambers, including two garderobes (toilets). The upper tier is 6m in diameter: originally it supported the beacon fire, which was later replaced by the lantern.

Fog signals were operated at the lighthouse as a warning to seafarers during dense fog which can suddenly descend on the peninsula. The fog signal was essential in days before radar and radio. Fog guns situated at the cliff edge were fired every 10 minutes. These were replaced by explosive charges set from the top of the tower on an extending arm. Finally, a compressed air horn (hooter) blasted every 45 seconds during fog.

The monks left the tower and were replaced by the first lighthouse keepers in the mid-17th century. In 1671, a new, but still coal-burning lantern was installed on top of the tower to replace the old beacon light. The coal fire was finally abandoned in 1791 when a whale oil-lantern 12 ft. in diameter with 12 lamps was installed. This continued until new gas lights were installed in 1871, lit by gas manufactured in the enclosure known as 'the gas yard'. In the 1860s, three dwellings were built for the lighthouse keepers. Paraffin oil became the source of power in 1911, and a clockwork mechanism changed the light from fixed to flashing. This mechanism had to be wound up every 25 minutes by the keeper on duty. Finally, in 1972 electricity became the power source, and light-sensitive switches were installed to control the lantern. In March 1996, The Hook Lighthouse was converted to automatic operation, and the last light-keepers who had climbed the stairs and tended the light were permanently withdrawn from the station. The lighthouse is now remotely controlled from Dún Laoghaire by the Commissioners of Irish Lights.

In 2001 the light was opened to the public as a tourist attraction after the old keepers' houses were turned into a visitor centre. In January 2011 The Hook's fog horn was heard for the last time as all the fog horns were turned off. It was felt that the technology on modern ships was so advanced that the fog horn was no longer required. In June 2011 the structure was placed first in a Lonely Planet piece listing the "Top 10 Flashiest Lighthouses"; the author described Hook as "The great granddaddy of lighthouses".

== See also ==
- List of lighthouses in Ireland

== Bibliography ==
- "Hook Head". Commissioners of Irish Lights.
- Cox, Ronald C. (1998). Civil Engineering Heritage: Ireland. Telford. pp. 100–102.
- Eagle, John (October 2001). "Hook Head Lighthouse". Lighthouse Digest. Archived from the original on 14 June 2011.
