= Dewane =

Dewane is a surname. Notable people with the surname include:

- Dennis Dewane (1834-?), Irish-born American politician
- Frank Dewane (1950–2026), American Catholic prelate
