= Dwayne Jones =

Dwayne Jones may refer to:

- Dwayne Jones (basketball), American basketball player
- Dwayne Jones (murder victim), Jamaican victim of hate crime

== See also ==
- Duane Jones (disambiguation)
