= Duane H. King =

Museum director and academic (1947 – 2017)

Dr. Duane Harold King (May 18, 1947 – September 17, 2017) was an American writer, educator, and museum director. King wrote extensively on Native American topics with a special interest in Cherokee and linguistics. He served as the Executive Director of the Southwest Museum of the American Indian, Senior Adviser of the National Museum for the American Indian, and Director of the Helmerich Center for American Research.

== Academic career ==
Duane Harold King was born on May 18, 1947, in Kingsport, Tennessee. King received his BA degree from the University of Tennessee; and a MA degree and Ph.D. from the University of Georgia.

He went on to found the Journal of Cherokee Studies and in his career was Executive Director at several organizations including the Museum of the Cherokee Indian in Cherokee, North Carolina. He went on to work as Assistant Director of the National Museum of the American Indian in New York City, and senior advisor for academic research and program outreach for the Smithsonian Institution's National Museum of the American Indian in Washington, D.C.. In 1995 he moved to Los Angeles to serve as Executive Director of the Southwest Museum in Los Angeles. Later in life he was the Executive Director of the Thomas Gilcrease Institute of American History and Art in Tulsa and promoted to the University of Tulsa's Vice President for Museum Affairs and Executive Director of the Helmerich Center for American Research.

He taught at the University level throughout his life and served as the first endowed Chair in Cherokee Studies at Western Carolina University. King was honored with the "Dr. Duane H. King Memorial Visiting Scholar Fund" at the Gilcrease Museum's Helmerich Center for American Research in Tulsa, Oklahoma.

He died on September 17, 2017, in Arcadia, California.

== Bibliography ==
King was associated with the following titles:

- The Memoirs of Lt. Henry Timberlake: The Story of a Soldier, Adventurer, and Emissary to the Cherokees, 1756–1765 (2007)
- The Cherokee Indian Nation: A Troubled History (1979)
- The Cherokee Trail of Tears (2007)
- Myths of the Cherokee (1900)
- Art of the Oklahoma State Capitol: The Senate Collection (2009)
- The Masterworks of Charles M. Russell: A Retrospective of Paintings and Sculpture (Foreword, 2009)
- Peace Medals: Negotiating Power in Early America (Contributor, 2012)
- Forging a Nation: The American History Collection at Gilcrease Museum (2010)
- Cherokee Nation: A History of Survival, Self Determination, and Identity (2018)
