= Hook Head =

Headland in County Wexford, Ireland

Hook Head Rinn Duáin
- Headland
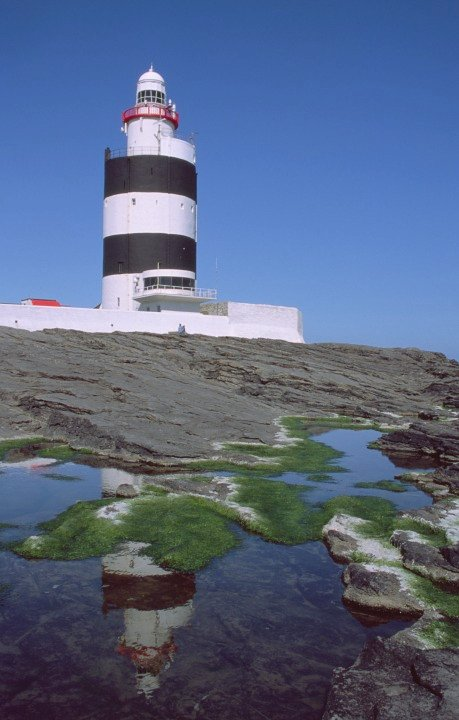
- Hook Lighthouse

- Location within Ireland
- Coordinates: 52°07′25.68″N 6°55′44.76″W

Hook Head (Irish: Rinn Duáin), historically called Rindowan, is a headland in County Wexford, Ireland, on the east side of the estuary of The Three Sisters (Rivers Nore, Suir and Barrow). It is part of the Hook peninsula and is adjacent to the historic townland of Loftus Hall. It is situated on the R734 road, 50 kilometres (31 mi) from Wexford town.

In Irish its name was originally Rinn Dubháin, Dubhán's point, named for a 5th-century Brittonic saint of that name (literally "little black [haired] one"). The English name is possibly a calque of his name, incorrectly read as being dubán, "fishing-hook".

== Lighthouse ==
This area is the location of Hook Lighthouse, the oldest working lighthouse in the world. Access to the lighthouse is by guided tours only which are available all year around. At the foot of the light house there is a cafe, a gift shop and a maritime exhibition. The lighthouse is a destination on the Ireland's Ancient East tourist route.

== Notable events ==
In October 2007 it was reported that a significant amount of oil had been found off the coast of Hook Head, in the north Celtic Sea. An Irish company, Providence Resources had drilled test holes and were said to have discovered good quality oil.

The annual "Hook Conference" antiques festival showcases local and international hooks.
