= Dwayne Benjamin (economist) =

Canadian economist

- Born: March 10, 1961 (age 65); Orillia, Ontario, Canada
- Education: University of Toronto
- Scientific career
- Fields: Economics
- Workplaces: University of Toronto

Dwayne Benjamin (born March 10, 1961) is a Canadian economist and member of the University of Toronto faculty, where he previously served as Chair of the Dept of Economics and Vice-Dean, Graduate Education in the Faculty of Arts and Science. As of July 1, 2021 Prof. Benjamin is the University of Toronto's Vice Provost for Strategic Enrolment Management.

From 2005 to 2008, Benjamin was the managing editor of the Canadian Journal of Economics, and is currently an associate editor of the journal Economic Development and Cultural Change. He is best known for his research on immigrants in the Canadian labour market, and for his work on agricultural households in developing countries.

== Biography ==
Benjamin received his B.Sc. from the University of Toronto in 1984. He later obtained M.A. and Ph.D. from Princeton University in 1986 and 1989 respectively.
