= Duane (surname) =

Duane is a surname. Notable persons with that surname include:

- Anthony Duane (1679–1747), Irish born American settler, father of James Duane
- Diane Duane (born 1952), American science fiction and fantasy author
- Iris Duane, Scottish politician
- James Duane (1733–1797), American lawyer, jurist, Continental Congressman, Revolutionary leader, and Mayor of New York City
- James Joseph Duane (born 1959), American legal academic
- James Chatham Duane (1824–1897), American engineering officer in the Union Army during the American Civil War
- Michael Duane (1915–1997), Irish-born British progressive educationalist and headteacher
- Ronnie Duane, rugby league footballer of the 1980s and 1990s
- Thomas Duane (born 1955), American member of the New York State Senate
- William Duane (physicist) (1872–1935), American physicist
- William John Duane (1780–1865), Irish born American politician and lawyer
