= Dwaine =

Dwaine may refer to:

First names

- Dwaine Board (born 1956), American football coach
- Dwaine Carpenter (born 1976), retired American football player who also played Canadian football
- Dwaine Wilson (born 1960), American retired Canadian football player

Middle names

- Howard Dwaine Dorough (born 1973), American singer-songwriter, dancer, musician, entertainer, actor, and businessman
- Michael Dwaine Phillips (born 1950), American Major League Baseball player

== See also ==
- Dwayne
