= 1724 in Ireland =

- Centuries: 16th; 17th; 18th; 19th; 20th
- Decades: 1700s; 1710s; 1720s; 1730s; 1740s
- See also: Other events of 1724; List of years in Ireland

Events from the year 1724 in Ireland

== Incumbent ==
- Monarch: George I

== Events ==
- March – Jonathan Swift publishes the first of the Drapier's Letters (A Letter To the Shop-Keepers, Tradesmen, Farmers, and Common-People of Ireland, Concerning the Brass Half-Pence Coined by Mr. Woods).
- 22 May – a total solar eclipse crosses Ireland around 6:30 p.m.
- John Neal, an instrument-maker and music publisher based in Christ Church Yard, Dublin, publishes the earliest printed collection of Irish music, which includes pieces by Irish harpist Turlough O'Carolan.

== Births ==
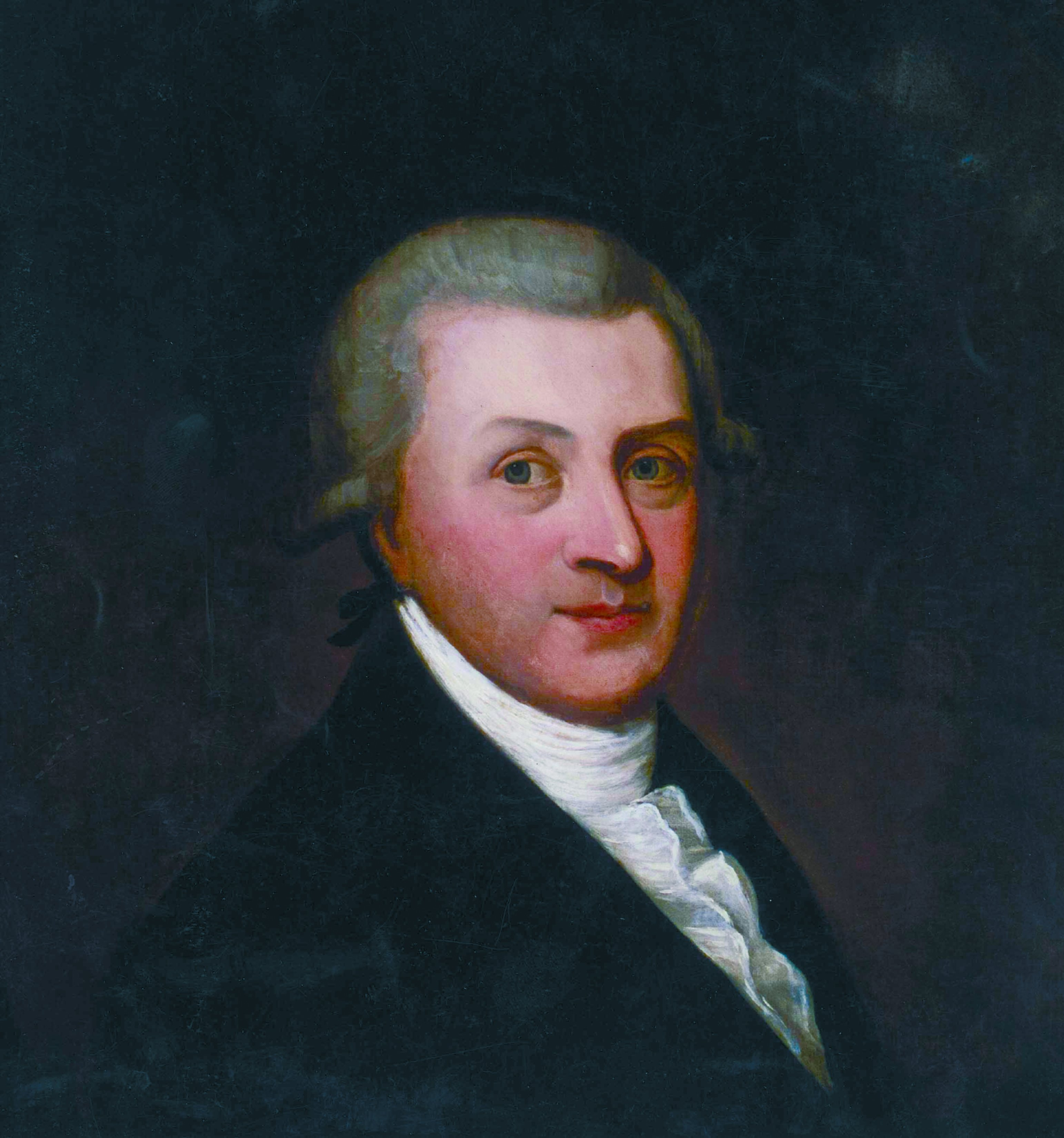
Arthur Guinness

- March 24 – Richard Hamilton, 4th Viscount Boyne, politician (d. 1789)
- October 20 – Thomas Taylour, 1st Earl of Bective, politician (d. 1795)
- Samuel Derrick, hack writer (d. 1769 in England)
- John Hely, later Hely-Hutchinson, lawyer and statesman (d. 1794)
- John Pomeroy, British Army officer (d. 1790)
- Frances Sheridan, novelist and playwright (d. 1766)
- 1724 or 1725 – Arthur Guinness, brewer (d. 1803)
- Approximate date
  - Robert Blakeney, politician (d. 1762)
  - Frances Greville née Macartney, poet (d. 1789)
  - Samuel Clossy anatomist (d. August 22, 1786 in Dublin, Ireland)

== Deaths ==
- February 10 or 1723 – Henry Colley, politician (b. c.1685)
- November – Liam an Dúna Mac Cairteáin, poet and soldier (b. 1668)
- John Barnwell, colonist in the Province of South Carolina (b. 1671)
- Approximate date – Proinsias Ó Doibhlin, poet and priest.
