= 1725 in Ireland =

- Centuries: 16th; 17th; 18th; 19th; 20th
- Decades: 1700s; 1710s; 1720s; 1730s; 1740s
- See also: Other events of 1725; List of years in Ireland

Events from the year 1725 in Ireland.

== Incumbent ==
- Monarch: George I

== Events ==
- June 24 – first recorded meeting of the Grand Lodge of Ireland in Dublin, making it the second most senior Grand Lodge in world Freemasonry, and the oldest in continuous existence.
- Irish Presbyterian ministers who refuse to subscribe at ordination to the Westminster Confession form the Presbytery of Antrim.

== Births ==
- May 15 – James Fortescue, politician (d. 1782)
- September 27 – Patrick d'Arcy, mathematician (d. 1779)
- September 28 (possible date) – Arthur Guinness, brewer and founder of the Guinness Brewery business and family (d. 1803)
- December 20 – John Parr, Governor of Nova Scotia (d. 1791)
- Robert Hellen, English-born lawyer and politician (d. 1793)
- Alexander McNutt, British Army officer and coloniser of Nova Scotia (d. 1811)

== Deaths ==
- March 31 – Henry Boyle, 1st Baron Carleton, Chancellor of the Exchequer of England and Lord Treasurer of Ireland (b. 1669)
- April 16 – James Barry, politician (b. 1661)
- December 26 – Katherine FitzGerald, Viscountess Grandison, heiress (b. 1660)
- James Terry, Jacobite officer of arms.
