= 1858 in Ireland =

- Centuries: 17th; 18th; 19th; 20th; 21st
- Decades: 1830s; 1840s; 1850s; 1860s; 1870s
- See also: 1858 in the United Kingdom; Other events of 1858; List of years in Ireland

Events from the year 1858 in Ireland.

== Events ==
- 17 March – In Dublin, James Stephens founds the revolutionary organisation which becomes known as the Irish Republican Brotherhood.
- Edward Harland, at this time general manager, buys the small shipyard on Queen's Island, Belfast, from his employer Robert Hickson in conjunction with Gustav Wilhelm Wolff.
- Ballinacourty lighthouse at Dungarvan harbour built.

== Arts and literature ==
- First free public library in Ireland opens in Dundalk.

== Births ==
- 11 January – Mildred Anne Butler, painter (died 1941).
- 13 February – James Murray Irwin, British Army doctor (died 1938).
- 6 March – Coslett Herbert Waddell, priest and botanist (died 1919).
- 11 March – Tom Clarke, republican (born in England; executed 1916).
- 2 May – Edith Anna Somerville, novelist (died 1949).
- 19 May – Mike Cleary, boxer (died 1893).
- 5 October – Thomas Cusack, Democrat U.S. Representative from Illinois (died 1926).
  Full date unknown
  - Anne Marjorie Robinson, artist (died 1924).

== Deaths ==
- 4 March – John Ryan, soldier, recipient of the Victoria Cross for gallantry in 1857 at Lucknow, India, killed in action (born 1823).
- 26 April – Francis Murphy, first Roman Catholic bishop of Adelaide, South Australia (born 1795).
- 22 July – Mary Aikenhead, founder of the Sisters of Charity (born 1787).
- 28 July – Alexander Wright, soldier, recipient of the Victoria Cross for gallantry in 1855 at Sebastopol, in the Crimea (born 1826).
- 17 August – Robert Cane, doctor, member of the Repeal Association and the Irish Confederation, Mayor of Kilkenny (born 1807).
  Full date unknown
  - John Hogan, sculptor (born 1800).
  - Benjamin Lett, bomber and arsonist in America and Canada (born 1813).
  - James Roche Verling, British Army surgeon, became personal surgeon to Napoleon Bonaparte on St Helena (born 1787).

== See also ==
- 1858 in Scotland
- 1858 in Wales
