= 1864 in Ireland =

- Centuries: 17th; 18th; 19th; 20th; 21st
- Decades: 1840s; 1850s; 1860s; 1870s; 1880s
- See also: 1864 in the United Kingdom; Other events of 1864; List of years in Ireland

Events from the year 1864 in Ireland.

== Events ==
- 1 January – civil registry of births, deaths and marriages replaces parish church registers.
- 30 January – opening of the National Gallery of Ireland in Dublin.
- May – Theobald Jones presents his Report on the progress made in collecting the Irish lichens to the Natural History Society of Dublin.
- 8 August – The first stage of the O'Connell Monument, Dublin's construction is achieved with the installation of a two-ton Dalkey granite foundation stone by Lord Mayor of Dublin Peter Paul McSwiney (a distant relative of O'Connell's).
- December – Jane Wilde is found to have libelled Mary Travers; Travers is awarded only a nominal farthing in damages but Lady and the newly knighted Sir William Wilde have to pay substantial costs.
- Foundation of the Munster Bank, later rescued as the Munster & Leinster Bank, a constituent of Allied Irish Banks.

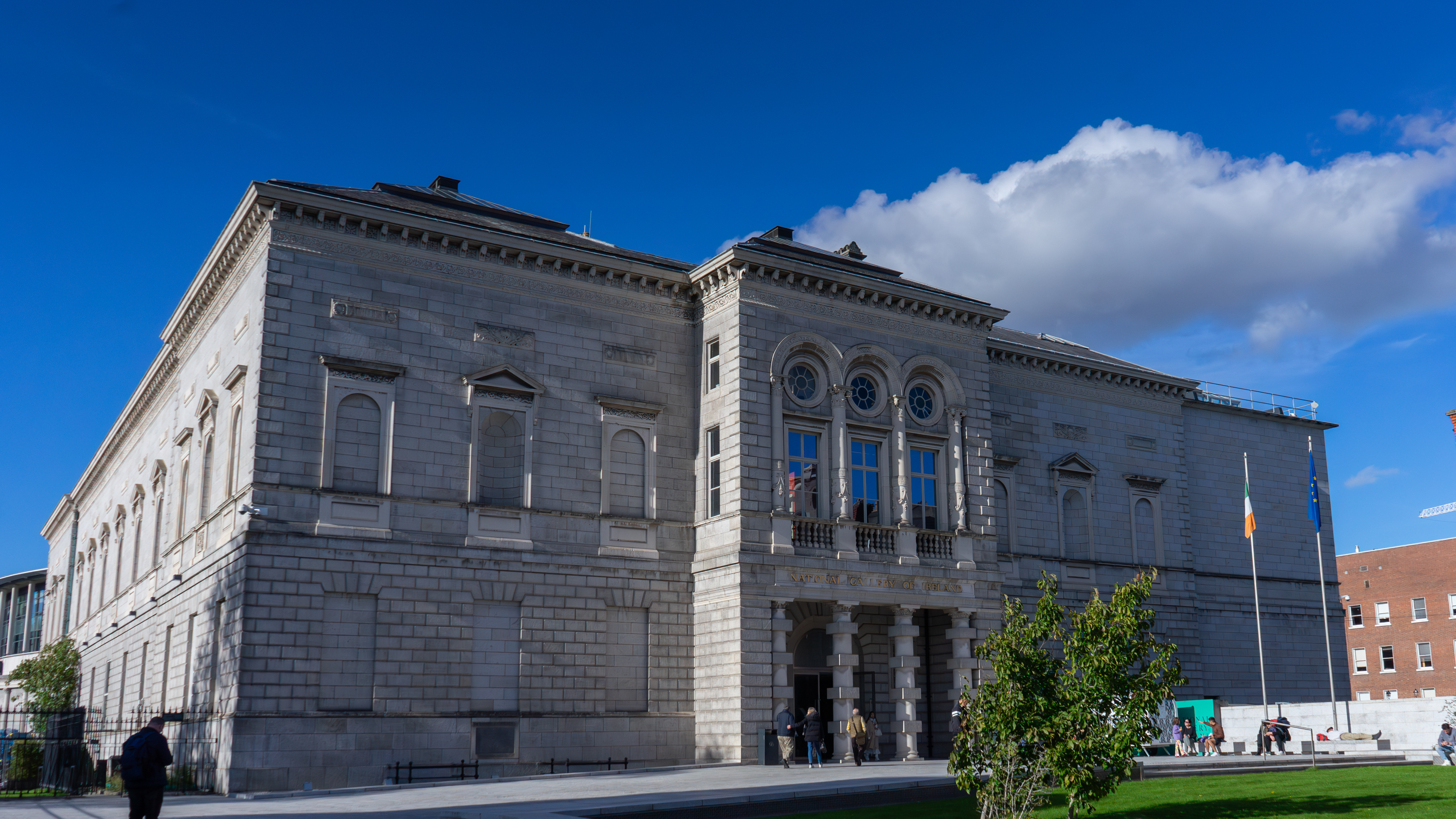
National Gallery of Ireland

== Arts and literature ==
- Sheridan Le Fanu publishes the Gothic locked room mystery-thriller Uncle Silas (serialized July–December in his Dublin University Magazine as "Maud Ruthyn and Uncle Silas"; published December as a three-volume novel by Richard Bentley in London).
- November – Samuel Ferguson publishes his collected poems Lays of the Western Gael.

== Births ==
- 1 January – John Mahony, Kerry hurler (died 1943).
- 31 January – Matilda Cullen Knowles, lichenologist (died 1933).
- 13 February – Stephen Gwynn, journalist, writer, poet and Nationalist politician (died 1950).
- 22 February – Michael Donohoe, Democrat U.S. Representative from Pennsylvania (died 1958).
- 4 March – Daniel Mannix, Catholic clergyman, Archbishop of Melbourne for 46 years (died 1963).
- 5 May – Henry Wilson, British Field Marshal and Conservative Party politician (killed by the Irish Republican Army 1922 in England).
- 11 May – Ethel Lilian Voynich, née Boole, novelist and composer (died 1960).
- 16 July – Joseph O'Mara, opera singer (died 1927).
- 1 September – Roger Casement, British diplomat, nationalist, poet and Irish revolutionary, executed at Pentonville Prison (died 1916).
- 19 October – Thomas Pakenham, 5th Earl of Longford, peer and soldier (died 1915).
- 11 November – John Meredith, Australian Army Brigadier General (died 1942).
- 22 November – Sir William Moore, 1st Baronet, Unionist MP and Lord Chief Justice of Northern Ireland 1925–1937 (died 1944).
- 9 December – Willoughby Hamilton, tennis player, Wimbledon Champion in 1890 (died 1943).
- 21 December – James Whiteside McCay, Lieutenant General in the Australian Army, member of the Victorian and Australian Parliaments (died 1930).
  Full date unknown
  - William Gerard Barry, painter (died 1941).
  - Denis Grimes, Limerick hurler (died 1920).
  - Michael McCarthy, nationalist anticlerical lawyer (died 1928).
  - Moira O'Neill (Nesta Shakespear Higginson), poet (died 1955).
  - J. Laurie Wallace, painter (died 1953).

== Deaths ==
- 10 January – Nicholas Callan, priest and scientist (born 1799).
- 20 May – John George Bowes, businessman and political figure in Canada East (b. c.1812).
- 18 June – William Smith O'Brien, nationalist (born 1803).
- 4 July – Thomas Colley Grattan, writer (born 1792).
- 23 July – Thomas Laughnan, soldier, recipient of the Victoria Cross for gallantry in 1857 at Lucknow, India (born 1824).
- 27 July – Joseph Patrick Haverty, painter (born 1794).
- 21 November – Charles McNally, Bishop of Clogher 1844–1864 (born 1787).
- 30 November – Patrick Cleburne, major general in Confederate States Army in the American Civil War, killed at the Battle of Franklin (born 1828).
- 8 December – George Boole, mathematician (born 1815).
- 23 December – James Bronterre O'Brien, Chartist leader, reformer and journalist (born 1804).
- William Guy Wall, painter (born 1792).

== See also ==
- 1864 in Scotland
- 1864 in Wales
