= 1723 in Ireland =

- Centuries: 16th; 17th; 18th; 19th; 20th
- Decades: 1700s; 1710s; 1720s; 1730s; 1740s
- See also: Other events of 1723; List of years in Ireland

Events from the year 1723 in Ireland.

== Incumbent ==
- Monarch: George I

== Events ==
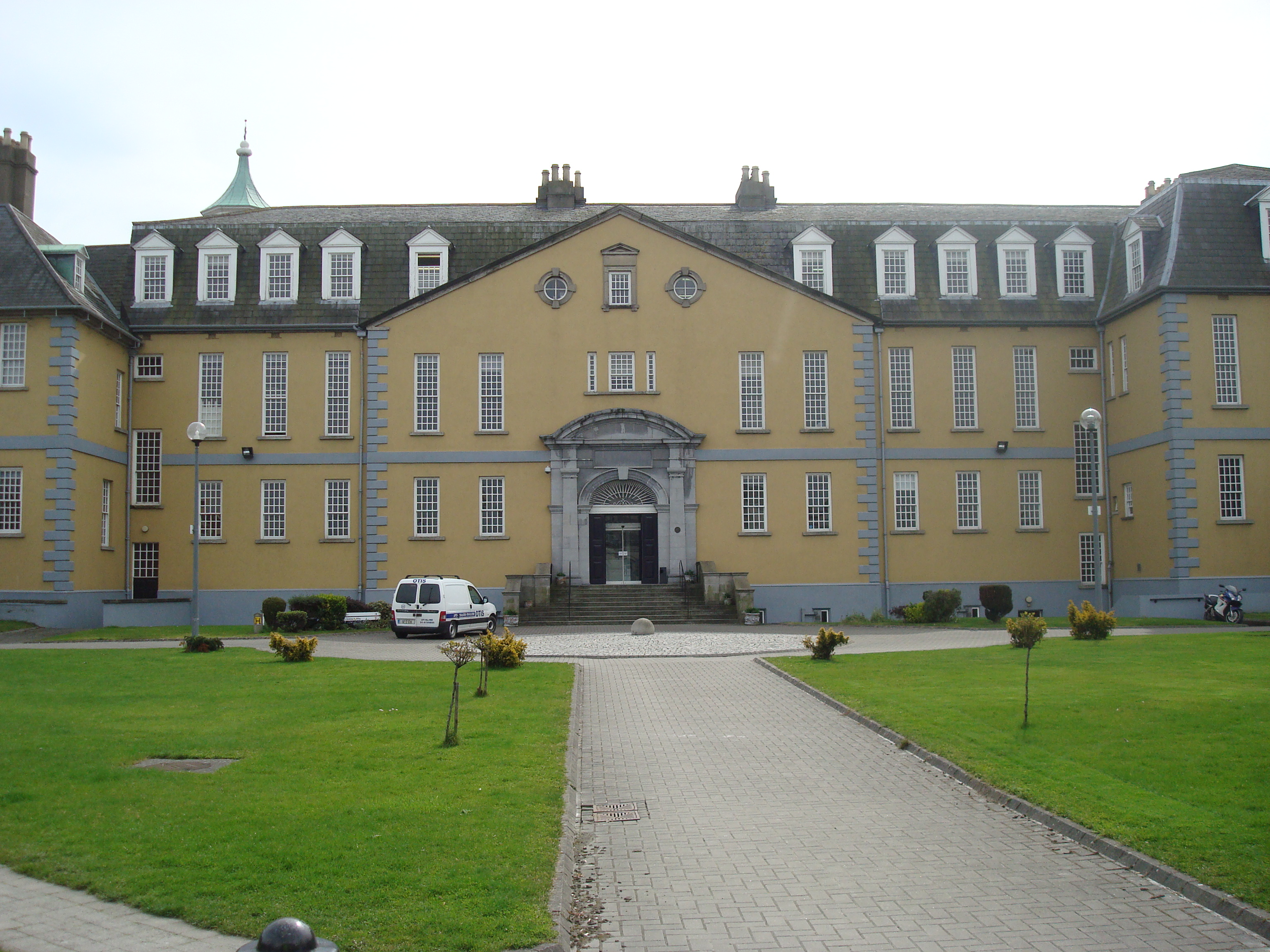
Dr Steevens' Hospital

- March 12 – the title of Viscount Palmerston is created in the Peerage of Ireland for the politician Henry Temple.
- December 14 – Bernard O'Gara is selected to succeed Francis Burke as Roman Catholic Archbishop of Tuam.
- The first portion of Dr Steevens' Hospital is opened at Kilmainham, Dublin.
- Avoca Handweavers, Ireland's oldest surviving business, is established in County Wicklow.

== Births ==
- Mervyn Archdall, antiquary (d. 1791)
- Approximate date – William Greatrakes, lawyer (d. 1781)

== Deaths ==
- February 11 – Captain Hildebrand Alington, 5th Baron Alington, soldier, last Baron Alington of the first creation (b. 1641)
- June 2 – Esther Vanhomrigh, Jonathan Swift's "Vanessa" (b. c. 1688)
- August – William Handcock, politician (b. 1676)
- August/September – Francis Burke, Roman Catholic Archbishop of Tuam
- September 16 – Gustavus Hamilton, 1st Viscount Boyne, soldier and politician (b. 1642)
- December 22 – Mary Joseph Butler, Benedictine abbess (b. 1641)
- Henry Colley, politician (b. c. 1685)
- Micheál Ó Mordha, Roman Catholic priest, philosopher and educationalist (b. c. 1639)
