= 1859 in Ireland =

- Centuries: 17th; 18th; 19th; 20th; 21st
- Decades: 1830s; 1840s; 1850s; 1860s; 1870s
- See also: 1859 in the United Kingdom; Other events of 1859; List of years in Ireland

Events from the year 1859 in Ireland.

== Events ==
- 29 March – The Irish Times is first published, in Dublin.
- 28 April–18 May – United Kingdom general election in Ireland produces a Tory majority in Irish seats.
- 30 April – American ship Pomona carrying, mainly Irish, emigrants from Liverpool to New York, is wrecked on a sandbank at Ballyconigar, off Wexford, with 424 deaths and only 24 survivors.
- Evangelical Ulster Revival.
- John Sisk establishes his building construction business in Cork.

== Births ==
- 3 January – Maurice Healy, lawyer, politician and MP (died 1923).
- 30 January – Tony Mullane, Major League Baseball player (died 1944).
- 1 February – Victor Herbert, composer, cellist and conductor (died 1924).
- 11 February – Barry Yelverton, 5th Viscount Avonmore, nobleman and officer (died 1885).
- February – James Murray, recipient of the Victoria Cross for gallantry in 1881 at Elandsfontein, near Pretoria, South Africa (died 1942).
- 13 April – Daniel Gallery, politician in Canada (died 1920).
- 22 April – Ada Rehan, Shakespearean actress (died 1916 in the United States).
- 4 May – William Hamilton, cricketer (died 1914).
- 16 October – Daisy Bates, née Margaret Dwyer, anthropologist (died 1951 in Australia).
  Full date unknown
  - Francis Fitzpatrick, recipient of the Victoria Cross for gallantry in 1879 during an attack on Sekukuni's Town, South Africa (died 1933).
  - Thomas Houghton, Anglican Clergyman and editor of the Gospel Magazine (died 1951).
  - Edward Martyn, playwright and activist (died 1923).
  - Justin Huntly McCarthy, politician and author (died 1936).
  - Walter Osborne, painter (died 1903).
  - Henry Jones Thaddeus, painter (died 1929).

== Deaths ==
- 14 April – Lady Morgan, novelist (b. c1776).
- 3 November – George Forrest, recipient of the Victoria Cross for gallantry during the Indian Rebellion of 1857 at Delhi, India (born 1800).
- 29 April – Dionysius Lardner, scientific writer (born 1793).
  Full date unknown
  - Peter McManus, Irish recipient of the Victoria Cross.

== See also ==
- 1859 in Scotland
- 1859 in Wales
