= 1787 in Ireland =

- Centuries: 16th; 17th; 18th; 19th; 20th
- Decades: 1760s; 1770s; 1780s; 1790s; 1800s
- See also: Other events of 1787; List of years in Ireland

Events from the year 1787 in Ireland.

== Incumbent ==
- Monarch: George III

== Events ==
- 19 August – John Butler, 12th Baron Dunboyne, having resigned as Roman Catholic Bishop of Cork and married a cousin, Maria, contrary to his vow of celibacy, swears oaths of allegiance, abjuration and Supremacy of the monarch as Supreme Governor of the Church of England in Clonmel, the only authenticated apostate in the Catholic hierarchy in Ireland.
- 30 August – the Richardson Baronetcy, of Augher in the County of Tyrone, is created in the Baronetage of Ireland for William Richardson.
- 31 August – the Carden Baronetcy, of Templemore in the County of Tipperary, is created in the Baronetage of Ireland for John Carden, commander of the 30th Regiment of Light Dragoons, which he had helped raise.
- 3 September – the Leslie Baronetcy, of Tarbert in the County of Kerry, is created in the Baronetage of Ireland for Edward Leslie.

== Arts and literature ==
- The first Theatre Royal, Dublin, closes.

== Births ==
- 19 January – Mary Aikenhead, founder of the Sisters of Charity (died 1858).
- 9 March – Robert Carew, 1st Baron Carew, politician (died 1856).
  Full date unknown
  - Edward Eagar, lawyer and criminal transported to Australia, politician (died 1866).
  - Reverend William Hickey, writer and philanthropist (died 1875).
  - Bishop Charles McNally, Bishop of Diocese of Clogher (died 1864).
  - James Roche Verling, British Army surgeon, became personal surgeon to Napoleon Bonaparte on St Helena (died 1858).

== Deaths ==
- March – George Montgomery, politician (born c.1727).
- 12 March – Marcus Paterson, lawyer and politician (born 1712).
- 4 May – Philip Skelton, clergyman and writer (born 1707).
- September – Philip Phillips, Roman Catholic Archbishop of Tuam.
- December – John Proby Osborne, lawyer and politician (born 1755).
- Francis Conyngham, 2nd Baron Conyngham, politician (born c.1725).
