= 1717 in Ireland =

- Centuries: 16th; 17th; 18th; 19th; 20th
- Decades: 1690s; 1700s; 1710s; 1720s; 1730s
- See also: Other events of 1717; List of years in Ireland

The following is a list of events from the year 1717 that occurred in Ireland:

== Incumbent ==
- Monarch: George I

== Events ==
- August 3 – the title Viscount Boyne, in the province of Leinster, is created in the peerage of Ireland in favour of the Scottish military commander Gustavus Hamilton, 1st Baron Hamilton of Stackallan.
- August 7 – Charles Paulet, 2nd Duke of Bolton, sworn in as Lord Lieutenant of Ireland.
- Hugh MacCurtin's A brief discourse in vindication of the antiquity of Ireland, out of many authentick Irish histories and chronicles (based on Geoffrey Keating's History of Ireland) is published in Dublin The author is imprisoned in the city about this time.

== Births ==
- April 12 – John Austin, Jesuit (d. 1784)
- September 20 – David Archibald, farmer and politician in Nova Scotia (d. 1795)
- Richard Geoghegan, agriculturalist (d. 1800)
- Lewis Nicola, officer in the American army during the American Revolutionary War (d. 1807)

== Deaths ==
- September – Ambrose MacDermott, Roman Catholic Bishop of Elphin.
- October 22 – Henry Luttrell, army officer (b. c.1655; shot and mortally wounded in his sedan chair in Dublin)
- December – Richard Hamilton, army officer (b. c.1655)
- James Barry, politician (b. 1659)
