= 1866 in Ireland =

- Centuries: 17th; 18th; 19th; 20th; 21st
- Decades: 1840s; 1850s; 1860s; 1870s; 1880s
- See also: 1866 in the United Kingdom; Other events of 1866; List of years in Ireland

Events from the year 1866 in Ireland.

== Events ==
- 28 January – the Midland Great Western Railway opens to Westport railway station.
- 22 June – Archbishop Cullen is elevated to the cardinalate as the first Irish Cardinal.
- 13 July – the SS Great Eastern sets out from Valentia Island on the second (successful) attempt to lay the transatlantic telegraph cable. Robert Halpin is master and William Thomson technical consultant.
- 14 October – St Peter's Church, Belfast, later to become the Roman Catholic Cathedral, is dedicated, although the building is incomplete.
- Maziere Brady retires as Lord Chancellor of Ireland, an office to which he was appointed in 1846.
- Alexandra College is founded at Milltown, Dublin by the Quaker Ann Jellicoe, the first women's college in Ireland to aim at a university-level education.

== Sport ==
- The first modern Irish Derby, created by the 3rd Earl of Howth, the 3rd Marquess of Drogheda and the 3rd Earl of Charlemont, is run at the Curragh Racecourse.
- The Ulster Yacht Club is revived at Bangor, County Down, on the initiative of Frederick Temple Blackwood, 5th Baron Dufferin and Claneboye.

== The Arts ==
- The ballad "Come Back to Erin" is composed by 'Claribel', the English songwriter Charlotte Alington Barnard.

== Births ==
- 5 February – Domhnall Ua Buachalla, member of First Dáil, Fianna Fáil TD, last Governor-General of the Irish Free State (died 1963).
- February – Michael Egan, trade unionist, city councillor and Cumann na nGaedheal TD (died 1947).
- 15 June – Charles Wood, composer (died 1926).
- 13 July – Emily Winifred Dickson, gynaecologist (died 1944 in Liverpool).
- 16 August – Dora Sigerson, poet (died 1918 in London).
- 1 November – Cheiro, born William John Warner, astrologer (died 1936 in the United States).
- 3 December – Ethna Carbery, born Anna Johnston, writer and poet (died 1902).
- 7 December – Maude Delap, marine biologist (died 1953)
- December – Thomas Byrne, recipient of the Victoria Cross for gallantry in 1898 at the Battle of Omdurman, Sudan (died 1944).
  Full date unknown
  - Éamon a Búrc, tailor and seanchaí (died 1942).
  - Master McGrath, greyhound (died 1873).
  - Bridget Sullivan, domestic housemaid for Borden family of Fall River, Massachusetts (died 1948 in the United States).

== Deaths ==
- 5 January – Augustus Warren Baldwin, naval officer and political figure in Upper Canada (born 1776).
- 11 January – Gustavus Vaughan Brooke, actor (born 1818).
- 17 January – George Petrie, painter, musician, antiquary and archaeologist (born 1790).
- 4 March – Alexander Campbell, religious leader in Britain and the United States (born 1788).
- 18 May – Francis Sylvester Mahony, humorist and poet (a.k.a. Father Prout) (born 1804).
- 26 October – John Kinder Labatt, brewer in Canada (born 1803).
- 26 October – Patrick McHale, soldier, recipient of the Victoria Cross for gallantry in 1857 at Lucknow, India (born 1826).
  Full date unknown
  - Edward Eagar, lawyer and criminal transported to Australia, politician (born 1787; died in London).

== See also ==
- 1866 in Scotland
- 1866 in Wales
