= 1856 in Ireland =

- Centuries: 17th; 18th; 19th; 20th; 21st
- Decades: 1830s; 1840s; 1850s; 1860s; 1870s
- See also: 1856 in the United Kingdom; Other events of 1856; List of years in Ireland

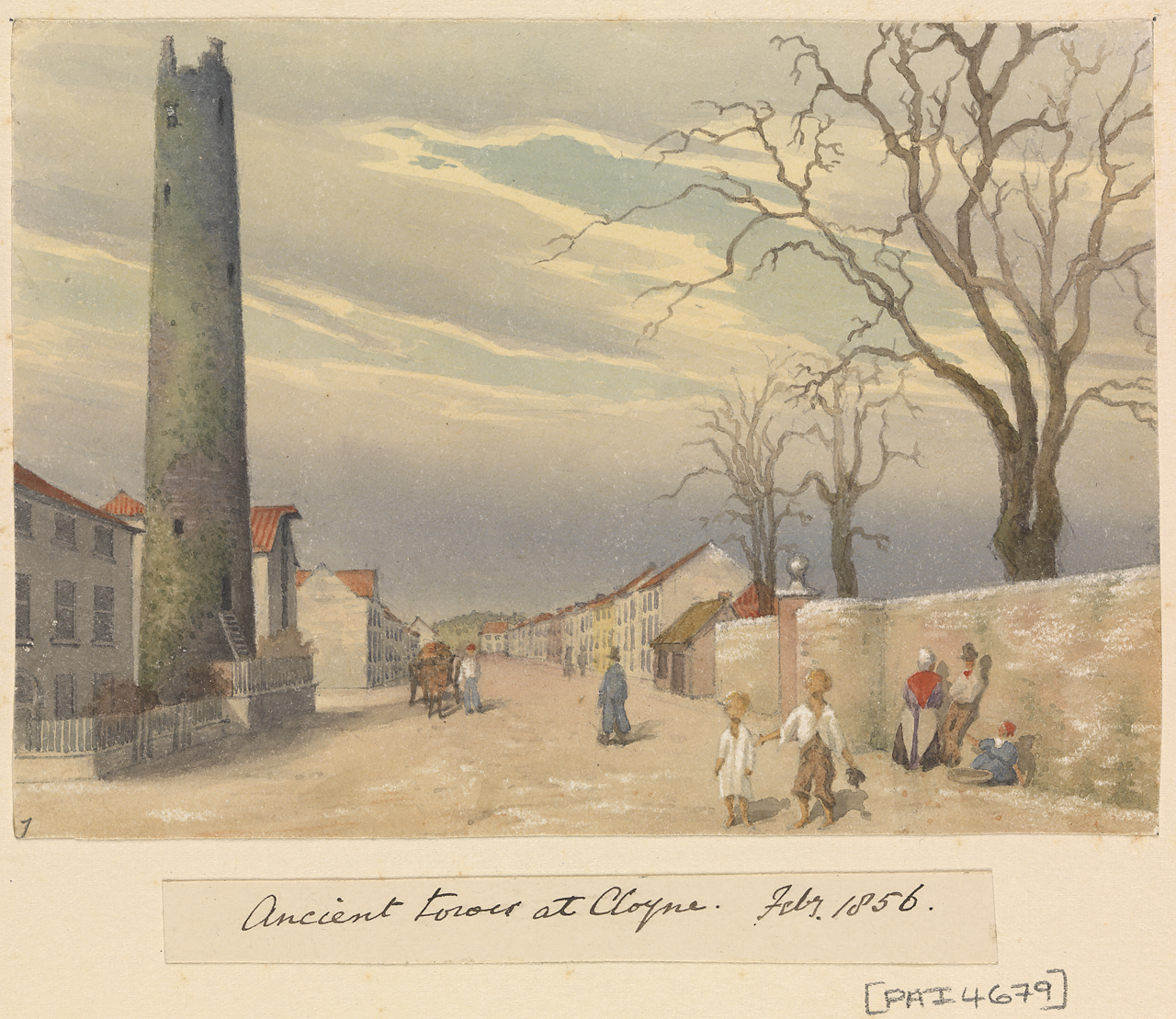
Ancient tower at Cloyne, 1856

Events from the year 1856 in Ireland.

== Events ==
- 1 January – M. H. Gill, printer to Dublin University, purchases the publishing and bookselling business of James McGlashan, renaming it McGlashan & Gill, the predecessor of Gill & Macmillan.
- 29 September – the neoclassical Roman Catholic St Mel's cathedral, Longford, opens for worship.
- 22 October
  - Coláiste Mhuire in Mullingar, County Westmeath opens its doors to students.
  - Grand National Banquet for soldiers returned from the Crimean War in a warehouse in Custom House docks, Dublin.
- 13 November – George Samuel Little, cashier for the Midland Great Western Railway was murdered in his office at the Broadstone railway station by handyman James Spollen. Dublin was transfixed by the case for months afterwards.

== Births ==
- 14 February – Frank Harris, author, editor, journalist and publisher (died 1931).
- 20 March – John Lavery, artist (died 1941).
- 26 March – William Massey, Prime Minister of New Zealand (died 1925 in New Zealand).
- 2 May – Matt Talbot, manual labourer and ascetic (died 1925).
- 26 July – George Bernard Shaw, playwright and winner of the Nobel Prize for Literature (1925) (died 1950).
- 18 August – Walter Richard Pollock Hamilton, soldier, recipient of the Victoria Cross for gallantry in 1879 at Futtehabad, Afghanistan (died 1879).
- 17 November – Thomas Taggart, politician in the United States (died 1929).
- 28 November – Patrick O'Donnell, Cardinal, Archbishop of Armagh and Primate of All Ireland (died 1927).
- 21 December
  - Catherine Coll, mother of Éamon de Valera (died 1932)
  - Sidney Royse Lysaght, writer (died 1941)
  - Tomás Ó Criomhthain, writer and fisherman (died 1937).

== Deaths ==
- 27 January – John Lalor, journalist and author (born 1814).
- 4 February – William Hare, 2nd Earl of Listowel, peer and MP (born 1801).
- 18 March – Henry Pottinger, soldier and colonial administrator, first Governor of Hong Kong (born 1789).
- 31 May – Yankee Sullivan, bare knuckle fighter and boxer (born 1811).
- 2 June – Robert Carew, 1st Baron Carew, politician (born 1787).
- 8 December – Father Theobald Mathew, temperance reformer (born 1790).

== See also ==
- 1856 in Scotland
- 1856 in Wales
