= 1721 in Ireland =

- Centuries: 16th; 17th; 18th; 19th; 20th
- Decades: 1700s; 1710s; 1720s; 1730s; 1740s
- See also: Other events of 1721; List of years in Ireland

Events from the year 1721 in Ireland.

== Incumbent ==
- Monarch: George I

== Events ==
- June 24 – an act of the Parliament of Great Britain permits Charles Butler, 1st Earl of Arran, to purchase the Irish estates forfeited by his brother James Butler, 2nd Duke of Ormonde.
- The title Baron Bessborough, of Bessborough, Piltown in the County of Kilkenny, is created in the Peerage of Ireland in favour of William Ponsonby.

== Births ==
- Henry Jones, poet and tragedian (d. 1770)
- Denis Maguire, Bishop (Catholic Church) (d. 1798)
- Robert Murray, merchant (d. 1786)
- Peter Parker, Admiral of the Fleet (d. 1811)
- John Ruxton, landowner and politician (d. 1785)
- Approximate date
  - Richard Houston, mezzotint engraver (d. 1775)
  - Alexander Montgomery, soldier and politician (d. 1785)

== Deaths ==
Thomas Dogget

- July 21 (hanged) – Walter Kennedy, pirate (b. c.1695)
- September 20 – Thomas Doggett, actor and benefactor (b. c.1670)
- Autumn – Godfrey Boate, judge (b. 1673)
- Denis Daly, judge (b. c.1638)
- Sir John Kirwan, merchant (b. 1650)
