= 1719 in Ireland =

- Centuries: 16th; 17th; 18th; 19th; 20th
- Decades: 1690s; 1700s; 1710s; 1720s; 1730s
- See also: Other events of 1719; List of years in Ireland

Events from the year 1719 in Ireland.

== Incumbent ==
- Monarch: George I

== Events ==
- November 2 – the Toleration Act ("For exempting the Protestant Dissenters of this kingdom from certain penalties to which they are now subject"), passed by the Parliament of Ireland, receives Royal Assent.
- March 26 Old Style (1720 New Style) – the Dependency of Ireland on Great Britain Act 1719 is passed by the Parliament of Great Britain.
- First service held in the rebuilt St. Werburgh's Church, Dublin (Church of Ireland), designed by Colonel Thomas Burgh, M.P., Surveyor General of Ireland.
- Cornelius Nary publishes a new Roman Catholic New Testament Bible translation into English, probably in Dublin.

== Births ==
- August 18 – Bernard Ward, 1st Viscount Bangor, politician (d. 1781)
- November 23 – Spranger Barry, actor (d. 1777)
- James Freney, highwayman (d. 1788)
- Godfrey Lill, lawyer and politician (d. 1783)
- Thomas Sheridan, actor and elocutionist (d. 1788)

== Deaths ==
- March 18 – Élie Bouhéreau, scholar-librarian (b. 1643)
- December 24 – William O'Brien, 3rd Earl of Inchiquin, governor (b. 1662)
- Henry Colley, politician (b. 1648)
- Richard Pockrich, landowner, military commander and politician (b. c.1666)
