= 1785 in Ireland =

- Centuries: 16th; 17th; 18th; 19th; 20th
- Decades: 1760s; 1770s; 1780s; 1790s; 1800s
- See also: Other events of 1785; List of years in Ireland

Events from the year 1785 in Ireland.

== Incumbent ==
- Monarch: George III

== Events ==
- 19 January – Richard Crosbie successfully flies in a hot air balloon from Ranelagh Gardens to Clontarf. He goes on to makes several unsuccessful attempts to cross the Irish Sea in a hydrogen-filled balloon.
- 10 May – a hot air balloon collides with a chimney in Tullamore, setting light to around 100 houses in the town centre.
- The Duke of Rutland, Lord Lieutenant of Ireland, with the support of William Pitt, successfully steers a liberal trade measure through the Parliament of Ireland, initially against the opposition of Henry Grattan and Henry Flood. However the Foxite opposition in the House of Commons of Great Britain so emasculates the measure with amendments that it is rejected in its new form in Ireland.
- Irish Academy established in Dublin. The Book of Ballymote is given to it.
- Belfast Academy established as a grammar school by Rev. Dr. James Crombie; by the 21st century it will be the oldest school in Belfast.
- Stratford-on-Slaney in County Wicklow is founded by the Earl of Aldeborough as a cotton manufacturing centre.
- Dunsink Observatory established.
- William Drennan publishes Letters of Orellana, an Irish Helot, to the seven northern counties not represented in the National Assembly of Delegates, held at Dublin, in October, 1784, for obtaining a more equal representation of the people in the Parliament of Ireland in Dublin (originally in the Belfast News-letter).

== Arts and literature ==
- Last annual Granard harp festival.

== Births ==
- March – Donat Henchy O'Brien, admiral in the British Royal Navy (died 1857).
- 17 March – Ellen Hutchins, botanist (died 1815).
- 24 June – Alexander Porter, United States Senator for Louisiana (died 1844).
- 7 December – William Francis Patrick Napier, soldier and military historian (died 1860).
- Approximate date – Edward Bransfield, master in the British Royal Navy (died 1852).

== Deaths ==
- 7 March – John Ruxton, landowner and politician (born 1721).
- 19 August – Michael Skerrett, Roman Catholic Archbishop of Tuam.
- Thomas Leland, historian (born 1722).
- Alexander Montgomery, soldier and politician (born c.1721).
