= 1720 in Ireland =

- Centuries: 16th; 17th; 18th; 19th; 20th
- Decades: 1700s; 1710s; 1720s; 1730s; 1740s
- See also: Other events of 1720; List of years in Ireland

Events from the year 1720 in Ireland.

== Incumbent ==
- Monarch: George I

== Events ==
- March 26 – the Parliament of Great Britain passes the Dependency of Ireland on Great Britain Act 1719 [that is, 1719 Old Style, meaning 1720 in New Style dating], also known as the Declaratory Act 1720, declaring the right of the Parliament of Great Britain to legislate for Ireland and denying the appellate jurisdiction of the Irish House of Lords.
- Dr Steevens' Hospital is established at Kilmainham, Dublin.
- The Royal Cork Yacht Club is established as the Water Club of the Cork Harbour by William O'Brien, 4th Earl of Inchiquin; it is widely acknowledged as the world's oldest yacht club.
- Jonathan Swift publishes Proposal for Universal Use of Irish Manufacture.

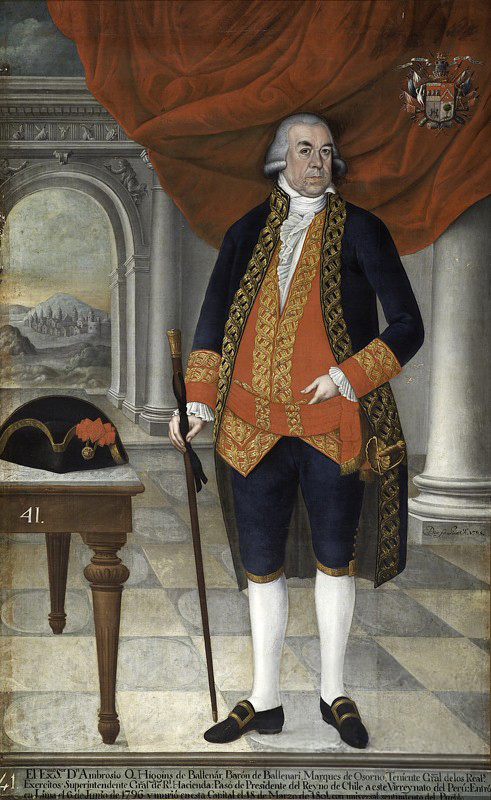
Ambrosio O'Higgins

== Births ==
- October 1 – Hector Theophilus de Cramahé, Lieutenant-Governor of Province of Quebec, and Lieutenant Governor of Detroit (d. 1788 in England)
- October 9 – Andrew Lewis, pioneer, surveyor and soldier in Virginia (d. 1781)
- October 18 – Peg Woffington, actress (d. 1760 in England)
  Full date unknown
  - Patrick Browne, physician and botanist (d. 1790)
  - Ambrose Bernard O'Higgins, afterwards Ambrosio O'Higgins, 1st Marquis of Osorno, Spanish colonial administrator (d. 1801 in Peru)
  - Seamus McMurphy, poet and outlaw (d. 1750)

== Deaths ==
- May 7 – James Cotter the Younger, hanged in Cork after a criminal trial, ostensibly for rape, but also connected to his key role in the 1713 Dublin election riot.
- August 18 – Matthew Aylmer, 1st Baron Aylmer, Admiral of the Royal Navy (b. c.1650)
