= 1860 in Ireland =

- Centuries: 17th; 18th; 19th; 20th; 21st
- Decades: 1840s; 1850s; 1860s; 1870s; 1880s
- See also: 1860 in the United Kingdom; Other events of 1860; List of years in Ireland

Events from the year 1860 in Ireland.

== Events ==
- 25 February – £11,000 collected at church doors in Dublin to finance the Pope's defence against the Risorgimento in Italy; £80,000 collected nationwide (the equivalent of several millions of modern-day Euros).
- 28 August – The Passing of the Landlord and Tenant Law Amendment (Ireland) Act 1860 ("Deasy's Land Act"), intended to reform tenants' rights.
- September – Myles O'Reilly's "Battalion of St Patrick" assist in the unsuccessful defence of Spoleto against the Risorgimento.
- 3 November – The Catholic Ballaghaderreen Cathedral is consecrated and opened.
- 11 November – Kildare Street Club, Dublin destroyed by fire.
- 21–23 November – Partry evictions, County Mayo: 68 families turned out of their houses by Thomas Plunket, Church of Ireland Bishop of Tuam.
- Construction begins on the Roman Catholic church that will become St Peter's Cathedral, Belfast.

== Arts and literature ==
- 27 March – the Irish-written melodrama The Colleen Bawn, or The Brides of Garryowen, written by and starring Dion Boucicault, is first performed at Laura Keene's Theatre, New York.
- Dr. George Sigerson's The Poets and Poetry of Munster is published.
- Anthony Trollope's novel Castle Richmond, set during the Great Famine, is completed and published in England.

== Births ==
- 1 January – John Cassidy, sculptor and painter (died 1939).
- 17 January – Douglas Hyde, member of the Seanad in 1922 and 1938; first President of Ireland and Gaelic scholar (died 1949).
- 1 June – Hugh Thomson, illustrator (died 1920).
- 8 June – Alicia Boole Stott, mathematician (died 1940).
- 25 June – John Danaher, soldier, recipient of the Victoria Cross for gallantry in 1881 near Pretoria, South Africa (died 1919).
- 23 July – Thomas Preston, scientist (died 1900).
- 8 December – Amanda McKittrick Ros, born Anna McKittrick, novelist and poet noted for her purple prose (died 1939).
- 25 December – Patrick S. Dinneen, lexicographer and historian (died 1934).

== Deaths ==
- 12 February – William Francis Patrick Napier, soldier and military historian (born 1785).
- 17 March – Anna Brownell Jameson, writer (born 1794).
- 23 October – Peter Boyle de Blaquière, politician in Canada and first chancellor of the University of Toronto (born 1783).
- 24 November – George Croly, poet, novelist, historian and divine (born 1780)

== See also ==
- 1860 in Scotland
- 1860 in Wales
