= 1926 in Ireland =

- Centuries: 18th; 19th; 20th; 21st
- Decades: 1900s; 1910s; 1920s; 1930s; 1940s
- See also: 1926 in Northern Ireland; Other events of 1926; List of years in Ireland

Events from the year 1926 in Ireland.

== Incumbents ==
- Governor-General: Tim Healy
- President of the Executive Council: W. T. Cosgrave (CnaG)
- Vice-President of the Executive Council: Kevin O'Higgins (CnaG)
- Minister for Finance: Ernest Blythe (CnaG)
- Chief Justice: Hugh Kennedy
- Dáil: 4th
- Seanad: 1925 Seanad

== Events ==
- 1 January – Douglas Hyde officially opens the Irish Free State broadcasting service, 2RN (later RTÉ Radio 1), in Dublin.
- 4 January – the country's first Aeroplane Club is formed in Dublin.
- 19 January – the Minister for Finance, Ernest Blythe, introduces a Bill providing for the issue of silver, nickel and bronze coins for Saorstát Éireann.
- 21 January – the Northern Ireland Minister for Agriculture meets his Free State counterpart, Patrick Hogan. The meeting paves the way for co-operation in securing better animal health for livestock.
- 12 February – the minister for Justice, Kevin O'Higgins, appoints a Committee on Evil Literature.
- 11 March – Éamon de Valera resigns as President of Sinn Féin at its Árd-Fheis when one of his proposals is defeated.
- 7 April – an elderly Irishwoman, Violet Gibson, shoots the Italian Prime Minister, Benito Mussolini, in Rome.
- 18 April – censuses are held in both parts of Ireland. The 1926 Irish Free State census records a population of 2,971,992; the population of Northern Ireland is 1,257,000.
- 29 April – Dublin city commissioners decide to remove Nelson's Pillar from O'Connell Street. However, this decision needs the approval of the Oireachtas.
- 16 May – at La Scala Theatre in Dublin a new political party is formed. Fianna Fáil – the Republican Party is launched by leading republicans including Éamon de Valera and Seán Lemass.
- 20 August – the Irish pilgrimage to the battlefields of France and Flanders leaves today. Celtic crosses are to be unveiled in memory of the members of the 16th Irish Division who died during World War I.
- 5 September – 48 people burned to death in a cinema fire at Dromcolliher, County Limerick.
- 17 November – President W. T. Cosgrave introduces the Public Safety (Emergency Powers) Bill following the killing of two unarmed gardaí.
- 25 November – Éamon de Valera addresses the first Fianna Fáil Árd-Fheis in Dublin.
- The Gaeltacht – regions with a significant percentage of Irish language speakers – is officially recognised, following the report of the first Coimisiún na Gaeltachta in the Free State.

=== Unknown date ===
- HB Ice Cream founded.
- Irish Sugar Manufacturing Company Limited established in Carlow as a private enterprise to process sugar beet.

== Arts and literature ==
- 8 February – Seán O'Casey's The Plough and the Stars (set in 1915–16) opens at the Abbey Theatre, Dublin. On 11 February, the performance is marred by ugly scenes in the audience: one man strikes an actress.
- 6 September – Lennox Robinson's play The Big House (set in 1918–23) opens at the Abbey Theatre.
- 22 November – George Bernard Shaw, having initially refused to accept the prize money for the Nobel Prize for Literature, will now accept the money but return it to the Nobel Foundation.
- M. J. Farrell's first novel, The Knight of Cheerful Countenance, is published.
- W. B. Yeats' Autobiographies is published as volume 6 of his Collected Edition by Macmillan in London.

== Sport ==
=== Association football ===
- 21 March – The Republic of Ireland national football team plays Italy for the first time.

Result: Italy 3–0 Ireland, in Turin

- League of Ireland
  Winners: Shelbourne
  FAI Cup
  Winners: Fordsons 3–2 Shamrock Rovers

=== Gaelic football ===
1926 All-Ireland Senior Football Championship:

- 17 September – Kerry beat Kildare after a replay at Croke Park, Dublin. Score: Kerry 1–4 to 0–4 Kildare.

=== Hurling ===
1926 All-Ireland Senior Hurling Championship:

- 24 October – Cork beat Kilkenny at Croke Park, Dublin. Score: Cork 4–6 to 2–0 Kilkenny.

== Births ==
- 15 January – Tom McEllistrim, Fianna Fáil TD (died 2000).
- 3 February – Jim Higgins, soccer player.
- 9 February – Garret FitzGerald, Taoiseach and leader of Fine Gael (died 2011).
- 10 March – Thomas Dunne, Fine Gael TD and MEP (died 1990).
- 24 March – Desmond Connell, Cardinal and Archbishop of Dublin (died 2017).
- 30 March – Ray McAnally, actor (died 1989).
- 4 April – Ronnie Masterson, actress (died 2014).
- 23 April – J. P. Donleavy, writer (died 2017).
- 26 April – Philomena Garvey, golfer (died 2009).
- 18 May – Sylvester Barrett, Fianna Fáil TD, Cabinet Minister and MEP (died 2002).
- 2 June – Milo O'Shea, actor (died 2013 in the United States).
- 21 July – Patrick Lalor, Fianna Fáil Teachta Dála for Laois–Offaly, Cabinet Minister, Member of the European Parliament and Laois hurler (died 2016).
- 1 August – Declan Costello, former Fine Gael TD, Attorney General and High Court judge (died 2011).
- 30 August – Tom O'Donnell, Fine Gael TD and MEP (died 2020).
- 3 November – Frank Filgas, cricketer (died 2006).
- 9 November – Hugh Leonard, dramatist, writer and journalist (died 2009).
- 10 November – Brian Behan, writer and trade unionist (died 2002).
- 23 November – Peter Desmond, soccer player (died 1990).
- 10 December – Dónall Mac Amhlaigh, writer (died 1989).
- 18 December – Stanley Bergin, cricketer (died 1969).

== Deaths ==
- 18 April – Dolway Walkington, Irish national rugby union captain (born 1867).
- 21 April – George Carew, 4th Baron Carew (born 1863).
- 14 June – Windham Wyndham-Quin, 4th Earl of Dunraven and Mount-Earl, peer (born 1841).
- 22 June – Norman Garstin, artist (born 1847).
- 19 November – Thomas Cusack, Democrat U.S. Representative from Illinois (born 1858).
