= 1792 in Ireland =

- Centuries: 16th; 17th; 18th; 19th; 20th
- Decades: 1770s; 1780s; 1790s; 1800s; 1810s
- See also: Other events of 1792; List of years in Ireland

Events from the year 1792 in Ireland.

== Incumbent ==
- Monarch: George III

== Events ==
- 20 January – Dublin Corporation, as part of the general debate on Catholic emancipation, approves by majority vote a resolution to King George III of the United Kingdom stating:

We feel ourselves peculiarly called upon to stand forward in the crisis to pray your majesty to preserve the Protestant Ascendancy in Ireland inviolate...

- 20 February – Parliament House, Dublin, catches fire during a legislative session. "Although in imminent danger of the roof falling in," it is noted later, "the House did not adjourn until a proper motion had been put and carried in the affirmative."
- 11–14 July – Belfast Harp Festival brings together and records the work of most of the remaining traditional players of the clàrsach. It is organised by Dr. James McDonnell, Robert Bradshaw and Henry Joy McCracken in the Assembly Rooms, Belfast, and Edward Bunting is one of three musicians to transcribe the music.
- 3–8 December – Catholic convention in Dublin, during which, at the motion of Christopher Dillon Bellew, it is resolved that the petition in favour of emancipation should be presented directly to the King.
- December (date unknown) – eleven people are drowned near the eighth lock of the Grand Canal when an overloaded barge capsizes.
- 14 December – the Society of United Irishmen circulates a pamphlet Address to the Volunteers, written by physician and poet William Drennan, which the authorities consider to be seditious.

=== Full date unknown ===
- Belfast Reading Society becomes the Belfast Society for Promoting Knowledge, later to become the Linen Hall Library.
- Beamish and Crawford's 'Cork Porter Brewery' is established when William Beamish and William Crawford purchase an existing brewery (from Edward Allen) on a site in Cramer's Lane used for brewing since at least the 17th century.
- The Leskean Cabinet, an 18th-century mineral and natural history collection, was bought by the Royal Dublin Society.

== Births ==
- 30 January – John Henry Hopkins, first bishop of the Episcopal Diocese of Vermont and eighth Presiding Bishop of the Episcopal Church in the United States of America (died 1868 in the United States).
- 23 April – Thomas Romney Robinson, astronomer and physicist (died 1882).
- 30 June – William Hamilton Maxwell, novelist (died 1850).
- 26 September (probable date) – William Hobson, officer in the British Royal Navy, first Governor-General of New Zealand and co-author of Treaty of Waitangi (died 1842 in New Zealand).
  Full date unknown
  - William Burke, murderer (hanged 1829 in Scotland) and (possibly) his accomplice William Hare.
  - Thomas Deane, architect (died 1871).
  - Thomas Colley Grattan, writer (died 1864).
  - James Arthur O'Connor, landscape painter (died 1841).
  - William Guy Wall, landscape painter (died 1864 in the United States).

== Deaths ==
- 18 February – George Browne, soldier of fortune, field-marshal in the Russian army (born 1698).
- 10 October – Denis Daly, landowner, MP and Mayor of Galway (born 1747).
