= 1783 in Ireland =

- Centuries: 16th; 17th; 18th; 19th; 20th
- Decades: 1760s; 1770s; 1780s; 1790s; 1800s
- See also: Other events of 1783; List of years in Ireland

Events from the year 1783 in Ireland.

== Incumbent ==
- Monarch: George III

== Events ==
- 5 March – the Count de Belgioioso, bound from Liverpool to China, founders on the Kish Bank in Dublin Bay in a storm. On 2 June, Scottish diver Charles Spalding and his nephew Ebenezer Watson die in attempting to salvage the £150,000-worth of cargo from the ship using a diving bell of Spalding's design.
- 17 March – Installation dinner for the founding of the Most Illustrious Order of St. Patrick by King George III of the United Kingdom takes place in Dublin Castle.
- 17 April – the Renunciation Act, is passed by Westminster. It acknowledges the exclusive right of the Parliament of Ireland to legislate for Ireland.
- 25 June – the Bank of Ireland opens for business in a former private residence at Mary's Abbey off Capel Street in Dublin and begins to issue notes.
- The first balloon ascent takes place on Leinster House grounds in Dublin
- 3 October – first Waterford Crystal glassmaking business begins production in Waterford.

== Births ==
- 26 April – Peter Boyle de Blaquière, politician in Canada and first chancellor of the University of Toronto (died 1860).
- 28 April – Sir Eyre Coote, KB, soldier (born 1726).
- 24 July – William Vesey-FitzGerald, 2nd Baron FitzGerald and Vesey, politician and statesman (died 1843).

== Deaths ==
- 2 October – Joseph Leeson, 1st Earl of Milltown (born 1701).
- 10 October – Henry Brooke, writer (born 1703).
- 2 December – Thomas Burke, physician, lawyer and Governor of North Carolina (b. c1747).
  Full date unknown
  - James Adair, trader with Native Americans and historian (b. c1709).
  - Robert Barber, quartermaster on HMS Adventure during Captain Cook's Second Voyage (born 1749).
