= 1933 in Ireland =

- Centuries: 18th; 19th; 20th; 21st
- Decades: 1910s; 1920s; 1930s; 1940s; 1950s
- See also: 1933 in Northern Ireland; Other events of 1933; List of years in Ireland

Events from the year 1933 in Ireland.

== Incumbents ==
- Governor-General: Domhnall Ua Buachalla
- President of the Executive Council: Éamon de Valera (FF)
- Vice-President of the Executive Council: Seán T. O'Kelly (FF)
- Minister for Finance: Seán MacEntee (FF)
- Chief Justice: Hugh Kennedy
- Dáil:
  - 7th (until 2 January 1933)
  - 8th (from 8 February 1933)
- Seanad: 1931 Seanad

== Events ==
- 4 February – Fianna Fáil, led by Éamon de Valera, win their first overall majority in Dáil Éireann. He is welcomed in his own constituency in County Clare where 77 horsemen and 77 torchbearers who light 77 tar barrels in honour of the 77 seats won by the party.
- 21 February – representatives from the Netherlands and Germany arrive in Galway to inspect the site of a proposed new £3 million airport.
- 22 February – General Eoin O'Duffy is removed from his post as Commissioner of the Garda Síochána.
- 27 February – four people die in the great snowstorm that is gripping the country.
- 2 March – a vote to remove the Oath of Allegiance to the British Crown is carried by 71 to 38.
- 17 March – Éamon de Valera gives a State reception in St. Patrick's Hall of Dublin Castle, the first since the foundation of the state.
- 27–30 March – 1933 Dublin riot: four nights of anti-communist rioting occur in Dublin City.
- 17 April – Ireland's first parachute jump, executed by Joseph Gilmore, is successful.
- 3 May – in Dáil Éireann the Bill to abolish the Oath of Allegiance is passed.
- August – the Irish Air Corps' host their first Air Pageant over Phoenix Park, Dublin, including mock aerial combat performed by planes.
- 10 August – General Eoin O'Duffy outlines his proposals for remodelling parliament. He favours a system of representatives from vocational and professional groups.
- 15 August – the Cistercians' Mount Melleray Abbey in County Waterford celebrates its centenary.
- 23 August – the Sugar Manufacture Act provides for nationalisation of the sugar beet processing industry to ensure self-sufficiency.
- 2 September – the United Ireland Organisation is formed as Cumann na nGaedheal, the National Centre Party and the Blueshirts (National Guard) agree to merge under the leadership of Eoin O'Duffy. W. T. Cosgrave will lead the party in Dáil Éireann.
- 14 September – the United Ireland movement, which has adopted the title 'Fine Gael', will contest the general election in October as a political party.
- 8 December – the Blueshirts are banned by the Fianna Fáil government.
- Scottish Democratic Fascist Party founded by William Weir Gilmour and Major Hume Sleigh to oppose Irish Catholic migration to Scotland.

== Arts and literature ==
- 6 February – premiere of Lennox Robinson's comedy Drama at Inish at the Abbey Theatre, Dublin.
- 28 March – premiere of Christine Longford's comedy Mr. Jiggins of Jigginstown at the Gate Theatre, Dublin.
- 1 May – Muiris Ó Súilleabháin publishes his memoir Fiche Bliain ag Fás / Twenty Years A'Growing.
- Winifred Mary Letts publishes her memoir Knockmaroon.
- W. B. Yeats publishes his Collected Poems and The Winding Stair and Other Poems.

== Sport ==
=== Association football ===
- League of Ireland
  Winners: Dundalk
  FAI Cup
  Winners: Shamrock Rovers 3–3, 3–0 Dolphins

=== Gaelic football ===
- All-Ireland Junior Football Championship
  Winners: Mayo county football team

=== Golf ===
- Irish Open is won by Bob Kenyon (England).

== Births ==
- 1 January – Jeremiah Coffey, Roman Catholic Bishop of the Diocese of Sale, Australia.
- 1 March – P. J. Sheehan, Fine Gael TD (died 2020).
- 11 March – Lochlainn O'Raifeartaigh, physicist responsible for the O'Raifeartaigh Theorem and the O'Raifeartaigh Model of supersymmetry breaking (died 2000).
- 24 April – Liam Hyland, Fianna Fáil Senator, TD and MEP.
- 27 April – Liam Tuohy, soccer player and manager.
- 3 May – John O'Leary, Fianna Fáil TD.
- 13 May – Martin O'Donoghue, economist, Fianna Fáil TD, Cabinet Minister and Seanad Éireann member (died 2018).
- 14 May – Frank Harte, singer and song collector (died 2005).
- 23 June – Proinsias Mac Aonghusa, journalist, broadcaster, chairman Bord na Gaeilge, president Conradh na Gaeilge (died 2003).
- 13 July – Frank Prendergast, Labour Party TD and Mayor of Limerick.
- 14 July – John Beresford, 8th Marquess of Waterford, peer.
- 22 July – Tommy Traynor, soccer player (died 2006).
- 18 August – Fiachra Ó Ceallaigh OFM, Auxiliary Bishop of Dublin from 1994.
- 20 August – Michael O'Halloran, politician in the UK (died 1999).
- 11 September – Amby Fogarty, soccer player.
- 19 September – Michael Howard, Fine Gael Senator.
- 22 October – Ronnie Nolan, soccer player.
- 29 October – Joseph Cassidy, Roman Catholic Archbishop of Tuam.
- 5 December – Edward Daly, Catholic Bishop of Derry (died 2016).
- 15 December – Sam Stephenson, architect (died 2006).
  Full date unknown
  - Kieran Carey, Tipperary hurler (died 2007).
  - Fergus Crawford, soccer player (died 1985).
  - Jack Mahon, Gaelic footballer with Galway (died 2005).
  - Tony O'Donohue, municipal politician in Toronto, Ontario, Canada.
  - Owen Walsh, artist (died 2002).

== Deaths ==
- 21 January – George Moore, novelist, poet, art critic and dramatist (born 1852).
- January – Bowman Malcolm, railway engineer (born 1854).
- 7 March – Thomas O'Shaughnessy, lawyer and judge (born 1850).
- 19 March – E. Temple Thurston, poet, playwright and author (born 1879).
- 23 April – Matilda Cullen Knowles, lichenologist (born 1864).
- 7 June – Matthias McDonnell Bodkin, Nationalist politician, lawyer and journalist (born 1850).
- 16 June – Denis O'Donnell, entrepreneur (born 1875).
- 29 June – Countess of Desart, Independent member of the 1922 Seanad and remained a member until her death.
- 1 July – P. H. McCarthy, labour leader and mayor of San Francisco (born 1863).
- 10 July – Francis Fitzpatrick, recipient of the Victoria Cross for gallantry in 1879 during an attack on Sekukuni's Town, South Africa (born 1859).
- 2 August – James McCombs, politician in New Zealand (born 1873).
- 5 August – Oscar Heron, Irish World War I flying ace (born 1896)
- 7 December – James Cullen, priest and mathematician (born 1867).
- 8 December – John Joly, scientist (born 1857).
  Full date unknown
  - Caspar Phair, Gold Commissioner in British Columbia.

== See also ==
- Anglo-Irish Trade War
