= 1861 in Ireland =

- Centuries: 17th; 18th; 19th; 20th; 21st
- Decades: 1840s; 1850s; 1860s; 1870s; 1880s
- See also: 1861 in the United Kingdom; Other events of 1861; List of years in Ireland

Events from the year 1861 in Ireland.

== Events ==
- 8–10 April – John George Adair of Glenveagh Castle evicts tenants at Derryveagh in County Donegal.
- 18 June – completion and official inauguration of the Wellington Monument, Dublin, in Phoenix Park, built to the design of Sir Robert Smirke (begun 1817).
- 21–30 August – Queen Victoria and Prince Albert, visit Ireland. They visit the Curragh Camp where Albert Edward, Prince of Wales, serving with the Grenadier Guards, has taken the actress Nellie Clifden as his first lover.
- 24 August – Mater Misericordiae Hospital is opened in Dublin by the Sisters of Mercy (architect: John Bourke).
- 17 September – the SS Great Eastern, with a badly damaged rudder, anchors in Cork Harbour for temporary repairs.
- Reconstruction of Fort Camden as part of the Cork Harbour defences begins.
- Irish Famine (1861)

== Arts and literature ==
- July – Sheridan Le Fanu becomes editor and proprietor of the Dublin University Magazine. From October he begins serialization of his novel The House by the Churchyard in it.

== Sport ==
- Malahide Cricket Club founded.

== Births ==
- 23 January – Katharine Tynan, novelist and poet (died 1931).
- 6 February – George Tyrrell, expelled Jesuit priest and Modernist Catholic scholar (died 1909).
- 19 March – Joseph MacRory, Cardinal, Archbishop of Armagh and Primate of All Ireland (died 1945).
- 15 April – Willie Redmond, nationalist politician, barrister, brother of John Redmond, killed in Battle of Messines (died 1917).
- 21 June – Nathaniel Thomas Hone, cricketer (died 1881).
- 16 October – J. B. Bury, historian, classical scholar and philologist (died 1927).
- 3 November – Thomas O'Brien Butler, composer (died 1915 in the sinking of RMS Lusitania).
- 5 November – Sir Tim O'Brien, 3rd Baronet, cricketer (died 1948).
  Full date unknown
  - Frank Duffy, labour leader in America (died 1955).
  - Nathaniel Hill, artist (died 1934).
  - Leonard Greenham Star Molloy, soldier, doctor, M.P. (died 1937)

== Deaths ==
- 13 May – William Henry Fitton, geologist (born 1780).
- 19 May – Mother Frances Mary Teresa Ball, founder of Irish Branch of the Institute of the Blessed Virgin Mary and Loreto schools (born 1794).
- 27 June – Robert O'Hara Burke, explorer of Australia (born 1821).
- 11 August – Catherine Hayes, opera diva (born 1818).
- 10 December – John O'Donovan, scholar and first historic topographer (born 1806).

== See also ==
- 1861 in Scotland
- 1861 in Wales
