= 1853 in Ireland =

- Centuries: 17th; 18th; 19th; 20th; 21st
- Decades: 1830s; 1840s; 1850s; 1860s; 1870s
- See also: 1853 in the United Kingdom; Other events of 1853; List of years in Ireland

Events from the year 1853 in Ireland.

== Events ==
- 15 February – City of Dublin Steam Packet Company PS Queen Victoria (1838), inward bound from Liverpool, sinks in a snowstorm at night below Baily Lighthouse on Howth Head with the loss of more than 80 lives.
- 12 May–31 October – Great Industrial Exhibition held in Dublin, promoted by William Dargan. Queen Victoria, accompanied by the Prince Consort and the Prince of Wales, pays an official visit on 29 August. John Hutton & Son of Dublin exhibit the Irish State Coach.

=== Full date unknown ===
- Glasnevin Model Farm, aka the Glasnevin Institute, a model farm in Glasnevin, was renamed as Albert College following a visit by the Prince Consort to the establishment

== Births ==
- 30 January – Leland Hone, cricketer (died 1896).
- 6 February – Robert John McConnell, businessman, baronet and Lord Mayor of Belfast (died 1927).
- 7 February – Egerton Bushe Coghill, painter (died 1921).
- 30 March – Frank O'Meara, artist (died 1888).
- March – John Doogan, soldier, recipient of the Victoria Cross for gallantry in 1881 at Laing's Nek, South Africa (died 1940).
- 10 April – Owen Hall, theatre writer and critic (died 1907).
- 3 July – Aloysius O'Kelly, painter (d. c1941).
- July – Thomas Brennan, a founder and joint first secretary of the Irish National Land League (died 1912).

== Deaths ==
- 20 March – Robert James Graves, physician (born 1796).
- 14 April – Robert Baldwin Sullivan, lawyer, judge, and politician in Canada, second Mayor of Toronto (born 1802).
- 21 September – Timothy Burns, Lieutenant Governor of Wisconsin from 1851 to 1853 (born 1820).
- 28 October – Valentine Lawless, 2nd Baron Cloncurry, politician (born 1773).

== See also ==
- 1853 in Scotland
- 1853 in Wales
