= 1865 in Ireland =

- Centuries: 17th; 18th; 19th; 20th; 21st
- Decades: 1840s; 1850s; 1860s; 1870s; 1880s
- See also: 1865 in the United Kingdom; Other events of 1865; List of years in Ireland

Events from the year 1865 in Ireland.

== Events ==
- 23 July – the SS Great Eastern sets out from Valentia Island on the first attempt to lay the transatlantic telegraph cable.
- Methodist College Belfast founded by the church; it will open to pupils in 1868.
- Work begins on the building of the Albert Memorial Clock, Belfast, as a memorial to Queen Victoria's late Prince Consort, Prince Albert.

== Arts and literature ==
- 9 May – International Exhibition of Arts and Manufactures opens in Dublin.
- 23 December – Gustavus Vaughan Brooke concludes a farewell season in Belfast, playing the title role in Richard III.
- Augustus Burke paints Connemara Girl.

== Deaths ==
- 6 February – Andrew Claude de la Cherois Crommelin, astronomer (died 1939).
- 16 March – Patsy Donovan, Major League Baseball player and manager (died 1953 in the United States).
- 17 March – Patrick Joseph Sullivan, mayor of Casper, Wyoming and Republican member of the United States Senate from Wyoming (died 1935 in the United States).
- 20 April – James Macmahon, civil servant and businessman, Under-Secretary for Ireland from 1918 to 1922 (died 1954).
- 4 May – Charles A. Callis, member of the Quorum of the Twelve Apostles of the Church of Jesus Christ of Latter-day Saints (died 1947 in the United States).
- 7 May – John MacBride, nationalist rebel and Easter Rising leader (executed 1916).
- 8 May – Charles FitzClarence, soldier, recipient of the Victoria Cross for gallantry in 1899 near Mafeking, South Africa (killed in action 1914).
- 10 June – Dermod O'Brien, painter (died 1945).
- 13 June – W. B. Yeats, poet and dramatist (died 1939).
- 18 June – Henry Allan, painter (died 1912).
- 24 June – Harry Plunket Greene, baritone (died 1936).
- 15 July – Alfred Harmsworth, 1st Viscount Northcliffe, newspaper and publishing magnate (died 1922)
- 16 July – 'George A. Birmingham' (Rev. James Owen Hannay), novelist (died 1950)
- 29 August – Thomas Kent, nationalist rebel (executed following a gunfight with the RIC 1916).
- 4 September – Alice Milligan, nationalist and poet (died 1953).
- 16 October – Rudolph Lambart, 10th Earl of Cavan, British Army commander in World War I, later Chief of the Imperial General Staff and Field Marshal (died 1946).
- 12 November – Herbert Trench, poet (died 1923).
  Full date unknown
  - Grace Rhys, née Little, novelist (died 1929).
  - Robert Henry Woods, Irish Unionist MP (died 1938).

== Births ==
- 1 April – John Cuffe, 3rd Earl of Desart, Conservative politician. (born 1818).
- 23 May – Benjamin Holmes, businessman and politician in Quebec (born 1794).
- 14 July – Nathaniel Burslem, soldier, recipient of the Victoria Cross for gallantry in .

MOVE FROM *1865* TO 1789 *25 July – Dr James Barry, military surgeon, revealed on death to be a woman, probably Margaret Ann Bulkley (born 1789-1799).

- 31 August – John Farrell, soldier and recipient of the Victoria Cross for gallantry at the 1854 Charge of the Light Brigade (born 1826).
- 2 September – William Rowan Hamilton, mathematician, physicist, and astronomer (born 1805).
  Full date unknown
  - Jones Quain, anatomist (born 1796).

=== See also ===
- 1865 in Scotland
- 1865 in Wales
