= 1863 in Ireland =

- Centuries: 17th; 18th; 19th; 20th; 21st
- Decades: 1840s; 1850s; 1860s; 1870s; 1880s
- See also: 1863 in the United Kingdom; Other events of 1863; List of years in Ireland

Events from the year 1863 in Ireland.

== Events ==
- 2 March – the Ulster Railway, which began construction in 1839, reaches Clones.
- 10 March – riots in Cork, related to nationalist unrest.
- 21 August – American clipper Anglo Saxon westbound is captured and burned by Confederate privateer Florida off Old Head of Kinsale.
- 28 November – first edition of The Irish People.

== Arts and literature ==
- Belleek Pottery "probably" began production of its Parian ware in 1863
- Sheridan Le Fanu publishes The House by the Churchyard.
- Ellen Bridget O'Connell publishes Derrynane Abbey in 1832, and other Poems.

== Births ==
- 1 February – George Carew, 4th Baron Carew (died 1926).
- February – George J. Gaskin, "silver-voiced Irish tenor" (died 1920 in the United States)
- 11 March – May Guinness, painter (died 1955).
- 17 March – P. H. McCarthy, labour leader and mayor of San Francisco (died 1933).
- 31 March – Sir Ion Hamilton Benn, 1st Baronet, businessman and British politician (died 1961).
- 2 April – Mabel Cahill, tennis player.
- 9 April – Henry De Vere Stacpoole, ship's doctor and author (died 1951).
- 12 August – Margaretta Eagar, nurse for the four daughters of Tsar Nicholas II and Tsarina Alexandra and memoirist (died 1936).
- 25 August – Eugene O'Growney, priest and scholar (died 1899).
- 7 September – Henry Boyle Townshend Somerville, Royal Navy hydrographic surveyor, murdered by Irish Republican Army (died 1936).
- 26 September – Caesar Litton Falkiner, Irish Unionist Party politician, barrister, writer and historian (died 1908).
- 24 November – Frederick Thomas Trouton, physicist responsible for Trouton's Rule (died 1922).
- Full date unknown – F. Elrington Ball, author and legal historian (died 1928).

== Deaths ==
- 1 January – Ambrose Madden, recipient of the Victoria Cross for gallantry in 1854 in the Crimea, at Little Inkerman (born 1806).
- 16 February – Denis Dynon, soldier, recipient of the Victoria Cross for gallantry in 1857 at Chota Behar, India (born 1822).
- 21 February – Samuel Hill, soldier, recipient of the Victoria Cross for gallantry in 1857 at Lucknow, India, later killed in action (born 1826).
- 7 July – William Mulready, painter (born 1786).
- 8 July – Francis Kenrick, headed the Diocese of Philadelphia, then was Archbishop of Baltimore (born 1796).
- 24 July – Thomas Arthur Bellew, landowner and politician (born 1820).
- 17 October – John Dunlay, recipient of the Victoria Cross for gallantry in 1857 at Lucknow, India (born 1831).
- 10 December – James FitzGibbon, British soldier and hero of the War of 1812 (born 1782).
- 10 December – Charles C. Ingham, painter and founder of New York National Academy of Design (born 1797).

== See also ==
- 1863 in Scotland
- 1863 in Wales
