= 1937 in Ireland =

- Centuries: 18th; 19th; 20th; 21st
- Decades: 1910s; 1920s; 1930s; 1940s; 1950s
- See also: 1937 in Northern Ireland; Other events of 1937; List of years in Ireland

Events from the year 1937 in Ireland.

== Incumbents ==
- President of the Executive Council: Éamon de Valera (FF) (until 29 December)
- Taoiseach: Éamon de Valera (FF) (from 29 December)
- Vice-President of the Executive Council: Seán T. O'Kelly (FF) (until 29 December)
- Tánaiste: Seán T. O'Kelly (FF) (from 29 December)
- Minister for Finance: Seán MacEntee (FF)
- Chief Justice: Timothy Sullivan
- Dáil:
  - 8th (until 14 June 1937)
  - 9th (from 21 July 1937)

== Events ==
- 22 January – the National Council of Women of Ireland is agitating for the formation of a women's police force.
- 8 April – all political parties and Church leaders gather at the Mansion House, Dublin to pay tribute to the Chief Rabbi, Dr. Yitzhak Herzog, who is leaving to take up the new post of Chief Rabbi of the British Mandate of Palestine.
- 6–27 February – Battle of Jarama (Spanish Civil War): The Connolly Column and other Irish volunteers take part.
- 14 April – the Minister for Finance, Seán MacEntee, delivers his budget. He reduces the costs of butter, sugar and tea.
- 30 April – Éamon de Valera introduces the new Constitution of Ireland. It recognises the institution of marriage and the family and prohibits divorce, as well as recognising the special position of the Roman Catholic Church in Ireland. It also recognises Judaism and other minority faiths. Although drafted in English, the Irish translation, made initially by Mícheál Ó Gríobhtha, will have legal priority.
- 11 May – the Constitution Bill receives its second reading in Dáil Éireann. Éamon de Valera dismisses claims that the Constitution provided for a dictatorship.
- 13 May – a bronze statue of King George II of Great Britain on St Stephen's Green, Dublin, is blown to pieces.
- 25 May – an amendment to the Constitution of Ireland proposing membership of the British Commonwealth is rejected.
- 8 June – Executive Powers (Consequential Provisions) Act 1937 passed by the Oireachtas retrospectively abolishing the office of Governor-General of the Irish Free State (most of whose powers have been removed under the Constitution (Amendment No. 27) Act 1936) and providing for a pension for the last office-holder, who was Domhnall Ua Buachalla.
- 14 June – the Draft Constitution is passed in the Dáil by 62 votes to 48. The Eighth Dáil is also dissolved and a general election is called.
- 30 June – Éamon de Valera winds up an election tour with a huge rally on College Green, Dublin.
- 1 July – Fianna Fáil wins the general election. The plebiscite on the Constitution of Ireland is passed by 56.5% of voters.
- 5 July – Éamon de Valera and Seán Lemass inspect the flying boat Caledonia before its survey flight across the Atlantic Ocean.
- 28 July – The Irish Republican Army unsuccessfully attempts the assassination by bomb of King George VI of the United Kingdom, in Belfast.
- 26 August – The Irish Times newspaper publishes its 25,000th edition in Dublin.
- 27 August – Dublin's first automatic traffic lights come into operation at the junction of Merrion Square and Clare Street.
- 16 September – 10 young County Mayo potato harvesters are killed in a bothy fire at Kirkintilloch in Scotland.
- 12 October – Kathleen Clarke (widow of Tom Clarke) addresses the Fianna Fáil Ardfheis, telling the party that it is moving away from its original values of republicanism.
- 10 November – the text of a new bill providing a seal of office for the president of Ireland is introduced in Dáil Éireann.
- 6 December – the seal of the president of Ireland is photographed for archive purposes.
- 11 December – the Kelly Line steamer Annagher sinks at Ballymacormick Point with the loss of nine crew and only one survivor.
- 29 December – the new Constitution of Ireland (Bunreacht na hÉireann) comes into force. The Irish Free State becomes known as "Ireland" (or Éire in the Irish language), and Éamon de Valera becomes its first Taoiseach (prime minister). A Presidential Commission (made up the Chief Justice, the Speaker of Dáil Éireann, and the President of the High Court) assumes the powers of the new presidency, pending the election of the first President of Ireland in June 1938. A 21-gun salute is fired from the Royal Hospital Kilmainham and the tricolour flag of Ireland flies over all public buildings.

== Arts and literature ==
- April – writers Elizabeth Bowen and Seán Ó Faoláin first meet, in London.
- 29 September – French playwright Antonin Artaud is expelled from Ireland.
- Samuel Beckett leaves Ireland to settle in Paris.
- The national radio station, Radio Athlone, is renamed Radio Éireann.
- Norah Hoult publishes her novel Coming from the Fair.
- Robert Lloyd Praeger publishes his natural-history memoir The Way That I Went: An Irishman in Ireland.

== Sport ==
=== Football ===
- League of Ireland
  Winners: Sligo Rovers
  FAI Cup
  Winners: Waterford 2–1 St James' Gate

=== Gaelic Athletic Association ===
- All-Ireland Senior Football Championship
  Winners: Kerry 4–4 v Cavan 1–7 (played at Croke Park, Dublin)
  All-Ireland Senior Hurling Championship
  Winners: Tipperary 3–11 v Kilkenny 0–3 (played at Fitzgerald Stadium, Killarney)

=== Golf ===
- Irish Open is won by Bert Gadd (England).

== Births ==
- 4 January – Mick O'Connell, Kerry Gaelic footballer.
- 22 February – Theo Dunne, footballer (died 2023).
- 2 April – Theo Foley, footballer (died 2020).
- 27 April – Robin Eames, Church of Ireland Primate of All Ireland and Archbishop of Armagh from 1986 to 2006.
- 20 May – Benjamin Guinness, 3rd Earl of Iveagh, hereditary peer and Seanad member (died 1992).
- 30 May – Christopher Haskins, businessman and life peer
- 31 May – Mary O'Rourke, Fianna Fáil TD and Cabinet Minister.
- 1 June – Rosaleen Linehan, actress.
- 3 June – Ray Brady, soccer player.
- 20 June – Jim Townsend, Labour politician and Seanad member (died 2021)
- 13 July – Ollie Walsh, Kilkenny hurler (died 1996).
- 19 August – Niall Andrews, Fianna Fáil TD and MEP (died 2006).
- 8 September – Joe Carolan, footballer (d. 2018).
- 26 September – Seán Fallon, Fianna Fáil politician, Cathaoirleach of Seanad Éireann from 1992 until his death (died 1995).
- October – Richard Johnton, President of the High Court.
- 24 November – Dónall Farmer, actor (died 2018).
- 15 December – Rodney Bernstein, cricketer.
- 25 December – Noel Furlong, businessman and poker player.

== Deaths ==
- 31 January – Samuel Edgar, cricketer (born 1913).
- 3 February – Thomas Moles, Ulster Unionist MP (born 1871).
- 9 February - Sir Samuel Kelly, coal merchant, philanthropist and businessperson, founder of John Kelly Limited (born 1879).
- 19 February – Leonard Molloy, soldier, doctor, M.P. (born 1861).
- 27 February – Charles Donnelly, poet, killed at the Jarama Front, Spanish Civil War (born 1914).
- 7 March – Tomás Ó Criomhthain, writer and fisherman (born 1856).
- 1 May – Herbert Hughes, musicologist, composer and critic (born 1882).
- 27 June – Arthur Douglas, cricketer and rugby player (born 1902).
- 14 July – Thomas Myles, surgeon, Home Ruler, involved in importation of arms for the Irish Volunteers in 1914 (born 1857).
- 5 September – Peter Daly, republican soldier, died of wounds received at Battle of Belchite (Spanish Civil War) (born 1903 in Liverpool).
- 5 November – Jack McAuliffe, boxer (born 1886).
- 23 November – Con Collins, Sinn Féin MP (born 1881).
