= 1943 in Ireland =

- Centuries: 18th; 19th; 20th; 21st
- Decades: 1920s; 1930s; 1940s; 1950s; 1960s
- See also: 1943 in Northern Ireland; Other events of 1943; List of years in Ireland

Events from the year 1943 in Ireland.

== Incumbents ==
- President: Douglas Hyde
- Taoiseach: Éamon de Valera (FF)
- Tánaiste: Seán T. O'Kelly (FF)
- Minister for Finance: Seán T. O'Kelly (FF)
- Chief Justice: Timothy Sullivan
- Dáil:
  - 10th (until 26 June 1943)
  - 11th (from 1 July 1943)
- Seanad:
  - 3rd (until 14 July 1943)
  - 4th (from 8 September 1943)

== Events ==
- February – Erwin Schrödinger delivers the series of public lectures later published as What Is Life? under the auspices of the Dublin Institute for Advanced Studies at Trinity College.
- 1 February – The Currency Commission is renamed the Central Bank of Ireland (under terms of the Central Bank Act 1942); it is not, however, given all the powers expected of a central bank.
- 23 February – S.S. Kyleclare is torpedoed in North Atlantic by U-456: eighteen die.
- 23–24 February – Cavan Orphanage Fire: thirty-five girls and a cook from St Joseph's Orphanage, an industrial school in Cavan, are killed in a fire in their dormitories. A subsequent inquiry absolves the Poor Clares of blame.
- 4 March – The Waterford Jail disaster occurred when the wall of the old city jail at Ballybricken in Waterford collapsed onto nearby houses, killing nine people and injuring seventeen.
- 17 March
  - Éamon de Valera and his government celebrate St. Patrick's Day with a céilí in the Great Hall of Dublin Castle. de Valera makes the speech "The Ireland That We Dreamed Of", commonly called the "comely maidens" speech.
  - A British military aircraft crashes at Templeport, Tullyhaw, County Cavan: the pilot and navigator survive.
- April – 8 republicans interned at Curragh Camp begin a hunger strike for release.
- 8 April - A US Air Force B-17 crashes near Clonakilty, Co Cork. The crew survive but a monkey they adopted in Brazil succumbs to the climate within a few days and was buried with full "military honours."
- 1 May – Sir Basil Brooke becomes Prime Minister of Northern Ireland.
- 10 May – The Ballymanus mine disaster occurs on a beach at Ballymanus, County Donegal, when local villagers attempt to bring ashore an unexploded naval mine. Eighteen men and boys between the ages of 13 and 34 are killed in the explosion. Another dies later.
- 15 May – Irish Oak (Irish Shipping) is torpedoed and sunk by U-607, 700 miles west of Ireland: the crew are rescued by Irish Plane eight hours later.
- 2 June – S.S. City of Bremen (Saorstat & Continental Steam Ship Company) is bombed by a Junkers Ju 88 and sunk in the Bay of Biscay: all eleven crew are rescued by a Spanish fishing trawler.
- 23 June – 1943 Irish general election: Fianna Fáil under Éamon de Valera remain in power, but lose their parliamentary majority. Electoral gains are made by the Labour Party and Clann na Talmhan, the national agricultural party.
- 1 July – 11th Dáil assembles.
- 5 October – In the largest manufacturing campaign in the history of the Irish Sugar Company, seven hundred employees at the Carlow Sugar Beet Factory will work in three shifts without pause for 18 weeks until all the 230,000 acres (930 km^{2}) of beet is processed.
- 29 December – MV Kerlogue (with a crew of 11) rescues 164 Germans from the Bay of Biscay.
- Winter – Irish coffee first served, at Foynes.

== Arts and literature ==
- 26 April – M. J. Molloy's first play, the comedy Old Road, is premiered at the Abbey Theatre, Dublin.
- 25 May – Christine Longford's historical play Patrick Sarsfield is premiered at the Gate Theatre, Dublin.
- The Irish Exhibition of Living Art is founded.
- The National Film Institute, a predecessor of the Irish Film Institute, is founded under the influence of the Catholic Church to counter perceived moral corruption in imported films.
- Cecil Day-Lewis publishes his poetry Word Over All.
- Mary Lavin publishes her first book, Tales from Bective Bridge, ten short stories about life in rural Ireland, which wins the James Tait Black Memorial Prize for fiction.
- Kate O'Brien publishes her novel The Last of Summer.
- Cathal Ó Sándair publishes his first novels, An t-eiteallán do-fheicthe and Triocha písa airgid.

== Sport ==
=== Football ===
League of Ireland
Winners: Cork United
FAI Cup
Winners: Drumcondra 2–1 Cork United.

=== Golf ===
- Irish Open is not played due to The Emergency.

== Births ==
- 17 January – Thomas John Curry, Auxiliary Bishop of the Roman Catholic Archdiocese of Los Angeles.
- 27 January – Seán Ryan, Labour Party (Ireland) TD, Seanad Éireann member.
- 30 January – Pat Henderson, Kilkenny hurler and manager.
- 9 February – Pat Dunne, soccer player (died 2015).
- 7 April – Francis O'Brien, Fianna Fáil Senator.
- 10 April – Patrick Hughes, cricketer.
- 1 May – Joe Walsh, Fianna Fáil TD and Cabinet Minister.
- 7 May – Donal McCann, actor (died 1999).
- 10 May – John L. Murray, Chief Justice of Ireland.
- 21 May – Michael Noonan, Fine Gael TD for Limerick East and Cabinet Minister.
- 14 June – Maurice Manning, Fine Gael politician.
- 22 September – Robert Ballagh, painter and designer.
- 30 September – Ray Burke, Fianna Fáil TD and Cabinet Minister convicted and jailed on charges arising from corruption in office.
- September – Hugh Byrne, Fianna Fáil TD.
- 30 November – Louis Belton, Fine Gael TD.
- December – Mick Roche, Tipperary hurler (died 2016).
  Full date unknown

- Paul Carney, criminal lawyer, presiding judge of the High Court (died 2015).
- Tony Felloni, heroin dealer
- Eoghan Harris, journalist and Senator.

== Deaths ==
- 10 January – Jamesy Kelleher, Cork hurler (born 1878).
- 28 January – Hugo Flinn, Fianna Fáil TD (born 1879).
- 29 January – Geoffrey Taylour, 4th Marquess of Headfort, peer (born 1878).
- 22 February – Wentworth Allen, cricketer (born 1894).
- 20 May – P. J. Brady, Irish Nationalist Member of UK Parliament for Dublin St Stephen's Green (born 1868).
- 11 June – Thomas O'Donnell, barrister, judge, Irish Nationalist, MP (born 1871).
- 19 July – Robert Alexander, sportsman (born 1910).
- 27 July – William Cummins, national teacher, member of Seanad (1922–1943).
- 7 August – Sarah Purser, painter and stained-glass maker (born 1848).
- 27 September – Willoughby Hamilton, tennis player, Wimbledon Champion in 1890 (born 1864).
- 28 September – Moya Llewelyn Davies, Republican activist and Gaelic scholar (born 1881).
- 20 November – P. T. Daly, trade unionist (born 1870).
- 31 December – John Mahony, Kerry hurler (born 1864).
