= 1857 in Ireland =

- Centuries: 17th; 18th; 19th; 20th; 21st
- Decades: 1830s; 1840s; 1850s; 1860s; 1870s
- See also: 1857 in the United Kingdom; Other events of 1857; List of years in Ireland

Events from the year 1857 in Ireland.

== Events ==
- 27 March – 24 April: General election.
- 12 July – in Belfast, confrontations between crowds of Catholics and Protestants turn into 10 days of rioting, exacerbated by the open-air preaching of Evangelical Presbyterian minister "Roaring" Hugh Hanna, with many of the police force joining the Protestant side. There are also riots in Derry, Portadown and Lurgan.
- 4 October – the Catholic St. Mary's Cathedral, Kilkenny, is opened.
- The Natural History Museum is opened by the Royal Dublin Society.
- Dublin Zoo's lions breed for the first time.
- Scrabo Tower erected above Newtownards as a memorial to Charles Vane, 3rd Marquess of Londonderry (d. 1854).
- Tom Gallaher sets up the Gallaher tobacco business in Derry.

== Births ==
- 7 February – Windham Wyndham-Quin, 5th Earl of Dunraven and Mount-Earl, peer and politician (died 1952).
- 12 February – Margaret Pearse, Fianna Fáil politician, mother of Patrick Pearse and Willie Pearse (died 1932).
- 11 March – Tom Clarke, nationalist, rebel and organiser of the Easter Rising (executed 1916).
- 17 April – Jane Barlow, poet and novelist (died 1917).
- 19 April – Patrick Stone, Member of the Western Australian Legislative Assembly (died 1942 in Australia).
- 20 April – Thomas Myles, surgeon, Home Ruler, involved in importation of arms for the Irish Volunteers in 1914 (died 1937).
- 22 April (probable year) – Ada Rehan, actress (died 1916 in the United States).
- 1 May – T. W. Rolleston, writer, poet and translator (died 1920).
- 19 May – William Jellett, Irish Unionist MP in the Parliament of the United Kingdom (died 1936).
- 11 July – Joseph Larmor, physicist (died 1942).
- 1 August – Alan Joseph Adamson, politician in Canada (died 1928).
- 22 August – William Dowler Morris, mayor of Ottawa (died 1931).
- 5 October – Peadar Mac Fhionnlaoich, Irish language writer (died 1942).
- 29 October – John Saul, prostitute (died 1904).
- 1 November
  - W. H. Grattan Flood, musicologist and historian (died 1928).
  - John Joly, physicist (died 1933).
- 18 November – Stanhope Forbes, painter (died 1947 in the United Kingdom).
- 20 November – Sir Henry Robinson, 1st Baronet, civil servant (died 1927).

== Deaths ==
- 29 January – John Connors, soldier, recipient of the Victoria Cross for gallantry in 1855 at Sebastopol in the Crimea (born 1830).
- 3 March – William Brown, creator and first admiral of the Argentine Navy (born 1777).
- 9 April – Charles McCorrie, soldier, recipient of the Victoria Cross for gallantry in 1855 at Sebastopol, in the Crimea (born 1830).
- 11 July – John Egan, businessman and politician in Ottawa (born 1811).
- 27 July – Laurence F. Renehan, priest and historian (born 1797).
- 10 August – John Wilson Croker, statesman and author (born 1780).
- 19 September – John Purcell, soldier, recipient of the Victoria Cross for gallantry in 1857 at Delhi, India, later killed in action (born 1814).
- 23 September – John Nicholson, military hero in India (born 1822).
- 17 December – Francis Beaufort, hydrographer and officer in the British Royal Navy, creator of the Beaufort scale (born 1774).

== See also ==
- 1857 in Scotland
- 1857 in Wales
