= 1862 in Ireland =

- Centuries: 17th; 18th; 19th; 20th; 21st
- Decades: 1840s; 1850s; 1860s; 1870s; 1880s
- See also: 1862 in the United Kingdom; Other events of 1862; List of years in Ireland

Events from the year 1862 in Ireland.

== Events ==
- 1 January – a formal partnership between Edward Harland and Gustav Wilhelm Wolff establishes the Belfast shipbuilders Harland and Wolff.
- 12 May – the Ulster Hall, a concert hall in Belfast, is opened.
- July – the Glasgow & Stranraer Steam Packet Company's PS Briton enters service on the first Stranraer to Larne ferry service.
- 10 September – Eliza Lynch becomes de facto First Lady of Paraguay.
- 3 December – the Midland Great Western Railway extends from Longford to Sligo.
  Undated
  - The Dublin Fire Brigade is established under the Dublin Corporation Fire Brigades Act.
  - Publication of The Leadbeater Papers, containing the first edition of the Annals of Ballitore by Mary Leadbeater (died 1826).

== Arts and literature ==
- Julia Kavanagh publishes French Women of Letters.
- Charles Lever publishes the novel Barrington serially.

== Births ==
- 2 April – Bryan Mahon, British Army general, Commander-in-Chief, Ireland and Senator (died 1930).
- 27 May – John Edward Campbell, mathematician (died 1924 in Oxford).
- 10 June – John de Robeck, admiral in the British Navy (died 1928).
- 11 June – Violet Florence Martin, author (died 1915).
- 14 June – John J. Glennon, Roman Catholic Archbishop of the Archdiocese of Saint Louis and Cardinal (died 1946).
- 21 September – Sir Thomas Esmonde, 11th Baronet, peer, MP and Seanad member (died 1935).
- 14 October – Samuel Cunningham, politician and Irish Privy Councillor (died 1946).
- 6 November – Edward Bulfin, British general during World War I (died 1939).
- 15 December – Jack (Nonpareil) Dempsey, boxer (died 1896).
- Gertrude Kelly, surgeon and radical activist in New York (died 1934 in the United States).

== Deaths ==
- 6 April – Fitz James O'Brien, author (born 1828).
- 21 May – John Drew, actor (born 1827).
- 18 July – John George de la Poer Beresford, Archbishop of Armagh (Church of Ireland) (born 1773).
- 30 July – Eugene O'Curry, scholar (born 1794).
- 30 November – James Sheridan Knowles, dramatist and actor (born 1784).

== See also ==
- 1862 in Scotland
- 1862 in Wales
