= 1718 in Ireland =

- Centuries: 16th; 17th; 18th; 19th; 20th
- Decades: 1690s; 1700s; 1710s; 1720s; 1730s
- See also: Other events of 1718; List of years in Ireland

Events from the year 1718 in Ireland.

== Incumbent ==
- Monarch: George I

== Events ==
- May 2 – the scholar William Nicolson is appointed Bishop of Derry.
- May 10 – the Roman Catholic Bishopric of Emly is united with the Archbishopric of Cashel.
- July–August – the first ships carrying Scotch-Irish emigrants from Ulster to North America arrive in Boston, Massachusetts.
- October 28 – Ashkenazi Jews lease the site for Ballybough Cemetery in Fairview, Dublin, Ireland's first Jewish cemetery.
- Jervis Street Hospital, is founded by six surgeons as the Charitable Infirmary in Cook Street, the first public voluntary hospital in the British Isles.

== Births ==
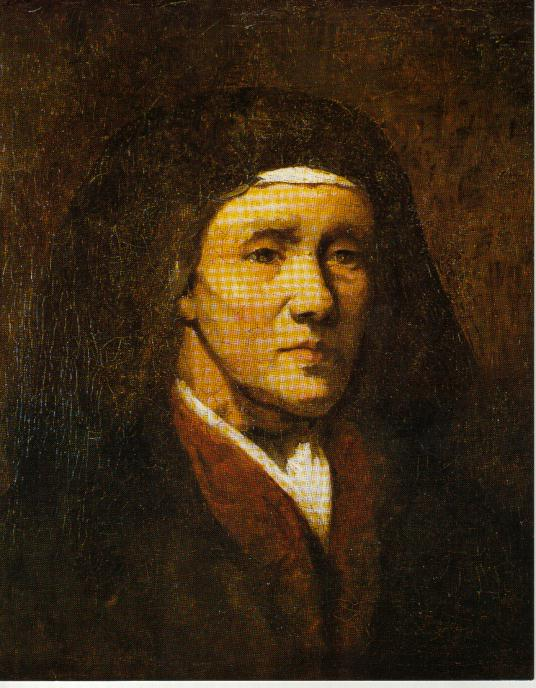
Nano Nagle

- March 2 – John Gore, 1st Baron Annaly, politician and peer (d. 1784)
- Nano Nagle, founder of the Presentation Sisters (d. 1784)

== Deaths ==
- October 24 – Thomas Parnell, clergyman and poet (b. 1679)
- 1716 or 1718 – Ruaidhrí Ó Flaithbheartaigh, historian (b. 1629)
