= 1928 in Ireland =

- Centuries: 18th; 19th; 20th; 21st
- Decades: 1900s; 1910s; 1920s; 1930s; 1940s
- See also: 1928 in Northern Ireland; Other events of 1928; List of years in Ireland

Events from the year 1928 in Ireland.

== Incumbents ==
- Governor-General:
  - Tim Healy (until 31 January 1928)
  - James McNeill (from 31 January 1928)
- President of the Executive Council: W. T. Cosgrave (CnaG)
- Vice-President of the Executive Council: Ernest Blythe (CnaG)
- Minister for Finance: Ernest Blythe (CnaG)
- Chief Justice: Hugh Kennedy
- Dáil: 6th
- Seanad:
  - 1925 Seanad (until 5 December 1928)
  - 1928 Seanad (from 6 December 1928)

== Events ==
- 29 January – in Belfast, members of the nationalist opposition protest at the Ulster Unionist Party government's plan to abolish Proportional representation.
- 31 January – the outgoing Governor-General, T. M. Healy leaves the Vice-Regal Lodge. His successor is James McNeill.
- 25 February – William O'Brien, former activist in the Home Rule and land campaigns, dies in London aged 75.
- 12 April – the first east–west transatlantic flight by aeroplane leaves Baldonnel Aerodrome in Dublin. Commandant James Fitzmaurice is on board the Bremen.
- 30 April – cheering crowds in New York greet the crew of the Bremen after it has made its transatlantic flight.
- 19 May – the foundation stone of the new Northern Ireland Parliament Building is laid at Stormont.
- 29 May – it is suggested that the old Irish flag – that of a gold harp with a blue background – should be carried at the Olympic Games in Amsterdam. However, the Irish tricolour has already been registered as the national flag.
- 14 June – amendments to the Court of Justice bill state that certain judges cannot be appointed if they do not have a competent knowledge of the Irish language.
- 30 July – the Irish Tricolour is raised for the first time at the Olympic Games when Dr. Pat O'Callaghan wins a gold medal for hammer throwing.
- 11–22 August – The Tailteann Games take place in Dublin.
- 27 August – fifteen countries, including Ireland, sign the Kellog Peace Pact in Paris. The Irish Tricolour flies at the Quai d'Orsay amongst the flags of 50 other nations.
- 30 August – the United States Secretary of State, Frank Kellogg, visits Dublin on his return journey from the Paris Peace Convention. He is granted the freedom of Dublin.
- 10 September – the Saorstát Pound ('Free State Pound') becomes a reality as the Currency Commission places into circulation the first (Series A) Irish banknotes issued for over a century.
- 10 December – the Belfast-built RMS Celtic (1901), the first ship to exceed 20,000 tons, runs aground off Cobh and is declared a total loss.
- 12 December – the first Irish coinage is circulated in the state making complete the introduction of banknotes and coinage of the Irish Free State.
- Irish becomes a compulsory subject for the Intermediate Certificate.
- Albanian missionary sister Agnes Gonxha Bojaxhiu, later known as Mother Teresa, joins the Sisters of Loreto at Loreto Abbey, Rathfarnham, to learn English in order to teach schoolchildren in India.

== Arts and literature ==
- 27 August – Taibhdhearc na Gaillimhe in Galway is founded as the national Irish language theatre, opening with Micheál Mac Liammóir's version of Dhiarmada agus Ghráinne.
- 14 October – The Gate Theatre in Dublin is founded by English actors and lovers Micheál Mac Liammóir and Hilton Edwards, initially using the Abbey Theatre's Peacock studio theatre space to stage works by European and American dramatists.
- Sir John Lavery paints Portrait of Lady Lavery as Kathleen Ni Houlihan, with his American-born wife Hazel Lavery posing for the figure on the new banknotes of the Republic of Ireland.
- The tenor John McCormack is appointed a Papal Count for his services to music.
- Tomás Ó Criomhthain's Allagar na h-Inise ("Island Cross-Talk") is published.
- Peadar O'Donnell's novel Islanders is published.
- W. B. Yeats' poetry collection The Tower is published.

== Sport ==
=== Football ===
- League of Ireland
  Winners: Bohemians
  FAI Cup
  Winners: Bohemians 2–1 Drumcondra

=== Gaelic Games ===
- The All-Ireland Champions are Cork (hurling) and Kildare (football).

=== Golf ===
- Irish Open is won by Ernest Whitcombe (England).

=== Olympics ===
- The first Irish team attends the Olympic Games.

== Births ==
- 23 January – Jackie Fahey, Fianna Fáil TD (died 2019).
- 2 February – Liam Burke, Fine Gael TD (died 2005).
- 2 March – Pearse Wyse, Fianna Fáil and Progressive Democrats politician (died 2009).
- 4 May – Thomas Kinsella, poet, translator, editor and publisher (died 2021).
- 24 May – William Trevor, novelist and playwright (died 2016).
- May – Brian O'Doherty a.k.a. Patrick Ireland, art critic in the United States.
- 4 June - Arthur Murphy, broadcaster and singer (died 2019)
- 17 July – Chris Giles, footballer (died 2006)
- 21 July – John B. Keane, playwright, novelist and essayist (died 2002).
- 23 July – Denis Mahony, Gaelic footballer (died 2017)
- 10 August – Peter Barry, Fine Gael TD, Tánaiste and Cabinet Minister (died 2016).
- 17 August
  - Ernest Bodell, cricketer (died 2003).
  - Pat Saward, soccer player (died 2002).
- 6 September – Maura Murphy, writer (died 2005).
- 6 October – Maeve Kyle, Olympian runner and hockey player and coach.
- 11 October – Robin Roe, clergyman and rugby player (died 2010).
- 12 October - Ulick O'Connor, writer, historian and critic (died 2019).
- 22 October – Dominic Behan, songwriter, novelist and playwright (died 1989).
- 19 November – Paddy Power, Fianna Fáil TD for Kildare and Cabinet Minister (died 2013).
- 1 December - Denis Donoghue, literary critic (died 2021).
- 17 December – Seán Purcell, Galway Gaelic footballer (died 2005).
  Full date unknown
  - Paddy Barry, Cork hurler (died 2000).
  - Seán South, IRA leader (fatally wounded during attack on Royal Ulster Constabulary barracks in Brookeborough 1957).

== Deaths ==
- 20 January – John de Robeck, admiral in the British Navy (born 1862).
- 25 February – William O'Brien, nationalist, journalist, agrarian agitator, social revolutionary, politician, party leader, newspaper publisher and author (born 1852).
- 17 March – Lawrence Bulger, international rugby union player (born 1875).
- 4 April – Alan Joseph Adamson, politician in Canada (born 1857).
- 18 May – Standish James O'Grady, author, journalist, historian (born 1846).
- 18 June – Donn Byrne, author, automobile accident (born 1889 in the United States).
- 22 July – Lawrence E. McGann, Democrat U.S. Representative from Illinois (born 1852).
- 6 August – W. H. Grattan Flood, musicologist and historian (born 1857).
- 29 September – John Devoy, Fenian organiser, exiled to America (born 1842).
- 6 October – Pádraic Ó Conaire, journalist and writer (born 1882).
- 26 October – Michael McCarthy, nationalist anticlerical lawyer (died 1928 in Ireland).
- 25 November – J. J. Clancy, Member of Parliament, barrister and journalist (born 1847).
  Full date unknown
  - F. Elrington Ball, author and legal historian (born 1863).
