= 1790 in Ireland =

- Centuries: 16th; 17th; 18th; 19th; 20th
- Decades: 1770s; 1780s; 1790s; 1800s; 1810s
- See also: Other events of 1790; List of years in Ireland

Events from the year 1790 in Ireland.

== Incumbents ==
- Monarch: George III

== Events ==
- 15 March – The Sick and Indigent Roomkeepers' Society is established in Dublin; by the 21st century this will be the city's oldest surviving charity.
- May – construction begins on the Royal Canal at Cross Guns Bridge in Phibsborough, Dublin.
- Armagh Observatory, founded by Richard Robinson, 1st Baron Rokeby, Archbishop of Armagh, begins to function.

== Arts and literature ==
- Emo Court, near Emo, County Laois, is designed by James Gandon for John Dawson, 1st Earl of Portarlington.

== Births ==
- 1 January – George Petrie, painter, musician, antiquary and archaeologist (died 1866).
- 15 April – Theobald Jones, British Royal Navy officer, lichenologist and Unionist politician (died 1868).
- June – Arthur Jacob, ophthalmologist (died 1874).
- 10 October – Father Theobald Mathew, temperance reformer (died 1856).
- Alexander Pearce, transported convict and cannibal (executed 1824 in Van Diemen's Land).

== Deaths ==
- Patrick Browne, physician and botanist (born 1720).

== Sources ==
- Clarke, Peter (1993-02-17). "The Royal Canal 1789-1993". Dublin Historical Record. 46 (1). Dublin: Old Dublin Society: 46–52. JSTOR 30101021.
