= Frank Filgas =

Irish cricketer (1926–2006)

Personal information
- Full name: Frank Miroslav Filgas
- Born: 3 November 1926; Carlow, Leinster, Ireland
- Died: 23 February 2006 (aged 79); Blackrock, Leinster, Ireland
- Batting: Right-handed
- Role: Wicket-keeper

Domestic team information
- Years: Team
- 1948: Ireland

Career statistics
Competition	First-class
Matches	1
Runs scored	3
Batting average	1.50
100s/50s	–/–
Top score	3
Catches/stumpings	1/–
- Source: Cricinfo, 30 December 2021

Frank Miroslav Filgas (3 November 1926 in County Carlow – 23 February 2006 in County Dublin) was an Irish cricketer. A right-handed batsman and wicket-keeper, he played just once for the Ireland cricket team, a first-class match against Scotland in July 1948.
