= 1942 in Ireland =

- Centuries: 18th; 19th; 20th; 21st
- Decades: 1920s; 1930s; 1940s; 1950s; 1960s
- See also: 1942 in Northern Ireland; Other events of 1942; List of years in Ireland

Events from the year 1942 in Ireland.

== Incumbents ==
- President: Douglas Hyde
- Taoiseach: Éamon de Valera (FF)
- Tánaiste: Seán T. O'Kelly (FF)
- Minister for Finance: Seán T. O'Kelly (FF)
- Chief Justice: Timothy Sullivan
- Dáil: 10th
- Seanad: 3rd

== Events ==
- January – Newrath Bridge in County Wicklow collapses.
- 3 March – due to The Emergency the rationing of gas is introduced.
- 5 March – it is announced that Ireland is to have a new Central Bank replacing the old Currency Commission.
- 16 March – Irish Willow is detained by German submarine U-753 but released.
- April – attempted shooting of two Garda Síochána detectives during a ceremony at Glasnevin Cemetery in Dublin, for which Brendan Behan is imprisoned.
- 2 June – speed levels are restricted to prevent wear of tyres on cars, motorcycles and buses.
- Summer – Ailtirí na hAiséirghe, a radical nationalist and fascist political party, is founded by Gearóid Ó Cuinneagáin.
- 7 June – first mass held at the new Roman Catholic Cavan Cathedral (dedication 27 September).
- 11 August – Irish Rose rescues seven survivors from the American ship Wawaloam in the Atlantic.
- 13 August – Irish Pine rescues nineteen survivors from the British ship Richmond Castle in the Atlantic.
- 26 August – Irish Willow rescues 47 survivors from the British ship Empire Breeze in the Atlantic.
- 17 September – Irish Larch rescues forty survivors from the Panamanian ship Stone Street in the Atlantic.
- 2 October – British cruiser Curacoa (D41) collides with the liner Queen Mary (serving as a troopship) off the coast of Donegal and sinks: 338 die.
- 15 November – Irish Pine torpedoed and sunk by U-608, in the North Atlantic: 33 die.
- 12 December – Irish Poplar collides with the launch Eileen and the Cork Harbour pilot during a force eight gale: five die.
- 22 December – there are reports of a split in the Labour Party due to the selection of candidates for the forthcoming general election.
- December – Government prohibits direct newspaper advertising in Ireland of jobs in the U.K. During the year £4.5M is remitted to Ireland from Irish workers already in Britain through the Post Office.

== Full date unknown ==
- Lice-born typhus spreads.
- The government was forced to "build a fleet of 30 horse-drawn barges to haul turf from the midland bogs to supply fuel to Dublin." The Grand Canal Company had recently replaced horse-drawn barges with the 'M' (motorised) class of barges powered by Bolinder engines, but these could not be operated during the War due to the shortage of petrol.

== Arts and literature ==
- 16 March – Paul Vincent Carroll's wartime drama The Strings Are False premieres at the Olympia Theatre (Dublin).
- June – Brendan Behan's "I Become a Borstal Boy" is published in The Bell.
- Elizabeth Bowen publishes Bowen's Court.
- Ina Boyle's sketch for small orchestra Wildgeese is premiered.
- Eric Cross publishes his novel The Tailor and Ansty, which is prohibited in Ireland by the Censorship of Publications Board.
- Patrick Kavanagh's poetry The Great Hunger is published by the Cuala Press.
- Maura Laverty's novel Never No More is published, having been serialised in The Bell.
- Seán Ó Súilleabháin's A Handbook of Irish Folklore is published for the Folklore of Ireland Society in Dublin.

== Sport ==
=== Football ===
League of Ireland
Winners: Cork United
FAI Cup
Winners: Dundalk 2 – 2, 3 – 1 Cork United.

=== Golf ===
- Irish Open is not played due to The Emergency.

== Births ==
- 12 January
  - John Moore, Roman Catholic Bishop of the Diocese of Bauchi, Nigeria (died 2010).
  - Hilary Weston, 26th Lieutenant Governor of Ontario (from 1997 to 2002) (died 2025).
- 16 January – Tony Doyle, actor (died 2000).
- 18 January – Eric Barber, soccer player.
- 1 February – P. J. Mara, political adviser and senator (died 2016).
- 12 February – Robert Ellison, Roman Catholic Bishop of the Diocese of Banjul, Gambia.
- 17 February – Bill Cullen, businessman
- 22 April – Aengus Fanning, journalist and editor (died 2012).
- 15 May – Pádraic McCormack, Fine Gael TD for Galway West.
- May – Enda Colleran, Gaelic footballer (died 2004).
- 28 July – John Bowman, historian and broadcaster.
- 1 August – Ned O'Keeffe, Independent TD for Cork East, originally Fianna Fáil.
- 18 August – Tommy Carroll, soccer player.
- 25 August – Pat Ingoldsby, television presenter, poet.
- 30 August – Jonathan Aitken, Conservative Member of Parliament (UK), perjurer and Anglican priest.
- 17 September – Des Lynam, sportscaster and British television personality.
- 4 October – Frank Stagg, Provisional Irish Republican Army member (died of hunger strike 1976 in Wakefield Prison).
- 20 October – Philomena Begley, country music singer.
- 24 October – Frank Delaney, novelist, journalist and broadcaster (died 2017).
- 28 November – Eiléan Ní Chuilleanáin, poet.
- 24 December – Anthony Clare, psychiatrist and broadcaster (died 2007).
  Full date unknown
  - Jackie Gilroy, Gaelic footballer (died 2007).
  - Padraig O'Malley, peacemaker, professor at the University of Massachusetts Boston and writer.
  - Dermot O'Reilly, musician, producer and songwriter in Canada (died 2007).
  - Ted Tynan, Workers' Party councillor in Cork.
  - Macdara Woods, poet (died 2018).

== Deaths ==
- 1 January – John Meredith, Australian Army Brigadier General (born 1864).
- 8 January – Thomas Hughes, soldier, recipient of the Victoria Cross for gallantry in 1916 at Guillemont, France (born 1885).
- 14 January – James Graham, cricketer (born 1906).
- 7 February – Bishop Patrick McKenna, Bishop of Clogher, 1909–1942 (born 1868).
- 8 April – Philip Meldon, cricketer (died 1874).
- 20 April – Thomas Kelly, founding member of Sinn Féin, member of First Dáil (Pro Treaty), later a member of Fianna Fáil.
- 11 May – George Nicolls, Sinn Féin and Cumann na nGaedheal TD.
- 29 May – Samuel Jacob Jackson, politician in Canada (born 1848).
- 30 June – Robert Pilkington, lawyer and politician who sat in Western Australian Legislative Assembly and British House of Commons (born 1870).
- 1 July – Peadar Toner Mac Fhionnlaoich, Irish Language writer (born 1857)
- 15 July – Paddy Finucane, RAF fighter pilot, youngest Wing Commander in RAF history, killed in action (born 1920).
- 10 September – Patrick Stone, Member of the Western Australian Legislative Assembly (born 1857).
- 12 September – Patrick R. Chalmers, writer on field sports and poet (born 1872).
- 30 September – Jack Finlay, Laois hurler and TD (born 1889).
- 6 November – Éamon a Búrc, tailor and seanchaí (born 1866).
- 23 November – Peadar Kearney, Irish Republican and songwriter, writer of the lyrics to The Soldier's Song (born 1883).
