= 1938 in Ireland =

- Centuries: 18th; 19th; 20th; 21st
- Decades: 1910s; 1920s; 1930s; 1940s; 1950s
- See also: 1938 in Northern Ireland; Other events of 1938; List of years in Ireland

Events from the year 1938 in Ireland.

== Incumbents ==
- President: Douglas Hyde (from 25 June 1938)
- Taoiseach: Éamon de Valera (FF)
- Tánaiste: Seán T. O'Kelly (FF)
- Minister for Finance: Seán MacEntee (FF)
- Chief Justice: Timothy Sullivan
- Dáil:
  - 9th (until 27 May 1938)
  - 10th (from 30 June 1938)
- Seanad:
  - 2nd (from 27 April 1938 until 22 July 1938)
  - 3rd (from 7 September 1938)

== Events ==
- 17 January – The Ford Motor Company in Cork City produced its 25,000th car.
- 13 April – The Department of Local Government & Public Health reported that cases of typhoid and diphtheria had reduced; however, infant deaths had increased.
- 25 April – An Anglo-Irish Trade Agreement, signed between Ireland and the United Kingdom in London, settled the Anglo-Irish Trade War and agreed to the Royal Navy abandoning the British sovereign bases at the Irish Treaty Ports in return for a payment of £10 million.
- 4 May – In the 1938 presidential election, Douglas Hyde was elected unopposed and was inaugurated on June 25 as Ireland's first president.
- 10 May – The Government made an order converting the "Saorstát pound" to the "Irish pound" as part of new constitutional reforms.
- 24 May – The new Anti-Partition Party took eight seats in a Unionist-controlled Londonderry Corporation.
- 17 June – 1938 Irish general election: The Fianna Fáil party led by Éamon de Valera retained power, winning the first overall majority in the history of the State.
- 30 June – 10th Dáil
- 7 July – The American ambassador to Britain, Joseph Kennedy, father of the future US president John, accompanied by his wife, Rose and eldest son, Joseph Jr., arrived in Dublin to receive an honorary doctorate from the National University of Ireland. During his two-day visit, the ambassador met President Douglas Hyde, Taoiseach and Minister for External Affairs Éamon de Valera, Lord Mayor of Dublin Alfie Byrne, and the Papal Nuncio Paschal Robinson. He visited the Book of Kells and the National Museum, and attended a state banquet in his honour at Dublin Castle.
- 11 July–3 October – Military installations at the Treaty Ports in the Republic (Berehaven, Spike Island at Cobh, and Lough Swilly) were handed over from British control to the Government of Ireland, under the terms of the Anglo-Irish Trade Agreement.
- 8 August – Dublin Corporation purchased 16 sets of traffic lights.
- 21 August – The £50,000 Cusack Stand with a capacity of 20,000 seats officially opened at Gaelic Athletic Association headquarters in Croke Park.
- 12 September – Éamon de Valera was elected President of the Assembly of the League of Nations in Geneva.
- 13 November – President Douglas Hyde attended an Ireland versus Poland friendly football match at Dalymount Park in Dublin, accompanied by Taoiseach Éamon de Valera, the Minister for Posts and Telegraphs, Oscar Traynor, and Attorney General Paddy Lynch. Association football being an English game, this provoked a public outcry from nationalist sporting quarters which resulted in Hyde being removed as patron of the Gaelic Athletic Association (GAA), and shunned. He was not reinstated by the GAA before his death, in July 1949. The Taoiseach and Minister who attended this Irish 3–2 victory were not patrons of the GAA and thus were not sanctioned by that organisation.

== Arts and literature ==
- 19 August – W. B. Yeats' drama Purgatory premiered at the Abbey Theatre, Dublin.
- Samuel Beckett published his novel Murphy.
- Cecil Day-Lewis published Overtures to Death, and Other Poems.
- Oliver St. John Gogarty published his poetry Others to Adorn, with a preface by W. B. Yeats.
- Louis MacNeice published I Crossed the Minch and his poetry The Earth Compels.
- Artist Colin Middleton first exhibited at the Royal Hibernian Academy.
- Ewart Milne published his poetry Forty North Fifty West, with woodcuts by Cecil Salkeld.
- Kate O'Brien published her novel Pray for the Wanderer.
- W. B. Yeats published New Poems, including "Lapis Lazuli".

== Sport ==
=== Association football ===
==== International results ====
- 18 May – Czechoslovakia 2–2 Ireland.
- 22 May – Poland 6–0 Ireland.
- 18 September – Ireland 4–0 Switzerland.
- 13 November – Ireland 3–2 Poland.

==== Domestic results ====
- League of Ireland
  Winners: Shamrock Rovers
  FAI Cup
  Winners: St James' Gate 2–1 Dundalk

=== Golf ===
- Irish Open was won by Bobby Locke (South Africa).

== Births ==
- 4 January – Jim Norton, character actor.
- 30 January – Mick Lanigan, Fianna Fáil Senator.
- 2 February
  - John Moriarty, writer and philosopher (died 2007).
  - Detta O'Cathain, Baroness O'Cathain, businesswoman and Conservative politician in Britain (died 2021).
- 27 March – Owen Dudley Edwards, historian and writer.
- 4 April – Declan Mulligan, rock guitarist.
- 29 April – Ray MacSharry, Tánaiste, Fianna Fáil Teachta Dála (TD), Cabinet Minister and European Commissioner.
- 2 May – Douglas Goodwin, cricketer.
- 13 May – Patrick Dineen, cricketer.
- 15 June – Mary Turner, trade unionist in Britain (died 2017).
- 2 July – John McDonnell, head coach for the University of Arkansas Razorbacks track team. (died 2021)
- 15 July – Andy McEvoy, association football player (died 1994).
- July – Seán Ó Cionnaith, Workers' Party politician (died 2003).
- 1 August – Paddy Moloney, traditional musician with The Chieftains (died 2021).
- 3 August – Terry Wogan, RTÉ and BBC broadcaster (died 2016).
- 5 October – Frank Patterson, tenor (died 2000).
- 16 October – Gerry Collins, Fianna Fáil TD for Limerick West, Cabinet Minister and Member of the European Parliament. (died 2026)
- 29 October – John Kirby, Roman Catholic Bishop of Clonfert.
- 31 October – Anne Buttimer, geographer (died 2017).
- 12 December – Dick Dowling, Fine Gael TD for Carlow–Kilkenny (died 2024)
- 28 December – Frank Kelly, actor (died 2016).

=== Full date unknown ===
- John Behan, sculptor.
- Gerald Davis, artist (died 2005).
- Pa Dillon, Kilkenny hurler (died 2013).
- Jim Lane, Irish republican and socialist (died 2026).
- Úna O'Connor, camogie player (died 2020).

== Deaths ==
- 24 February – Thomas Gann, doctor, archaeologist and writer (born 1867).
- 3 June – John Flanagan, three-time Olympic gold medalist in the hammer throw (born 1873).
- 27 July – Tom Crean, Antarctic explorer and publican (born 1877).
- 4 August – William Moxley, representative from Illinois' 6th congressional district (born 1851).
- 8 September – Robert Henry Woods, Irish Unionist MP (born 1865).
- 21 October – Sir John Purser Griffith, member of the Seanad.
- 7 November – James Murray Irwin, British Army doctor (born 1858).
- 12 December – James McNeill, politician and second Governor-General of the Irish Free State (born 1869).
