= 1794 in Ireland =

- Centuries: 16th; 17th; 18th; 19th; 20th
- Decades: 1770s; 1780s; 1790s; 1800s; 1810s
- See also: Other events of 1794; List of years in Ireland

Events from the year 1794 in Ireland.

== Incumbent ==
- Monarch: George III

== Events ==
- 1 January – Lagan Canal opened throughout from Belfast to Lough Neagh.
- 4 May – Dublin Society of United Irishmen suppressed.
- 29 June – physician and poet William Drennan, a leading figure in the Dublin Society of United Irishmen, is tried for seditious libel for circulating a pamphlet Address to the Volunteers in 1792; he is acquitted but withdraws from further direct political commitment.
- November – Richard Lovell Edgeworth demonstrates a semaphore line from Donaghadee across the Irish Sea to Portpatrick in Scotland.
- Establishment of Ballincollig Gunpowder Mills.
- Mary Leadbeater publishes Extracts and Original Anecdotes for the Improvement of Youth anonymously in Dublin.

== Births ==
- 9 January – Mother Frances Mary Teresa Ball, founder of Irish Branch of the Institute of the Blessed Virgin Mary and Loreto schools (died 1861).
- 4 March – William Carleton, writer (died 1869).
- 23 April – Benjamin Holmes, businessman and politician in Quebec (died 1865).
- 6 May – Price Blackwood, 4th Baron Dufferin and Claneboye, Royal Navy captain (died 1841).
- 17 May – Anna Brownell Jameson, writer (died 1860).
- 10 July – William Maginn, journalist and writer (died 1842).
- 18 July – Feargus O'Connor, political radical and Chartist leader (died 1855 in England)
- 20 November – Eugene O'Curry, scholar (died 1862).
  Full date unknown
  - Joseph Patrick Haverty, painter (died 1864).
  - Sir Alexander Macdonnell, 1st Baronet, lawyer, civil servant and commissioner of national education in Ireland (died 1875).

== Deaths ==
- 7 June – John Browne, 1st Baron Kilmaine, politician (born 1726).
  Full date unknown
  - Richard Robinson, 1st Baron Rokeby, Archbishop of Armagh and founder of the Armagh Observatory (born 1709).
