= 1782 in Ireland =

- Centuries: 16th; 17th; 18th; 19th; 20th
- Decades: 1760s; 1770s; 1780s; 1790s; 1800s
- See also: Other events of 1782; List of years in Ireland

Events from the year 1782 in Ireland.

== Incumbent ==
- Monarch: George III

== Events ==
- 6 February – The collapse of a floor due to a rotten beam at Neale's Musick Hall, Dublin leaves many people injured, 11 of whom die shortly afterwards due to their injuries.
- 'Constitution of 1782', the collective legal changes which restore legislative independence to the Parliament of Ireland, giving rise to "Grattan's Parliament".
  - 15 February – at a convention held in Dungannon, delegates from a number of Ulster Volunteer corps pledge support for resolutions advocating legislative independence for Ireland.
  - 20 February – the phrase "Protestant Ascendancy" is first used by Sir Boyle Roche (in passing) in a speech to the Irish House of Commons.
  - 16 April – Henry Grattan declares the independence of the Irish House of Commons.
  - 17 May – the Parliament of Great Britain under Prime Minister Lord Rockingham passes the Repeal of Act for Securing Dependence of Ireland Act, repealing the Dependency of Ireland on Great Britain Act 1719.
  - Repeal of Poynings' Law.
  - Irish judges are granted the same security of tenure as their English counterparts.

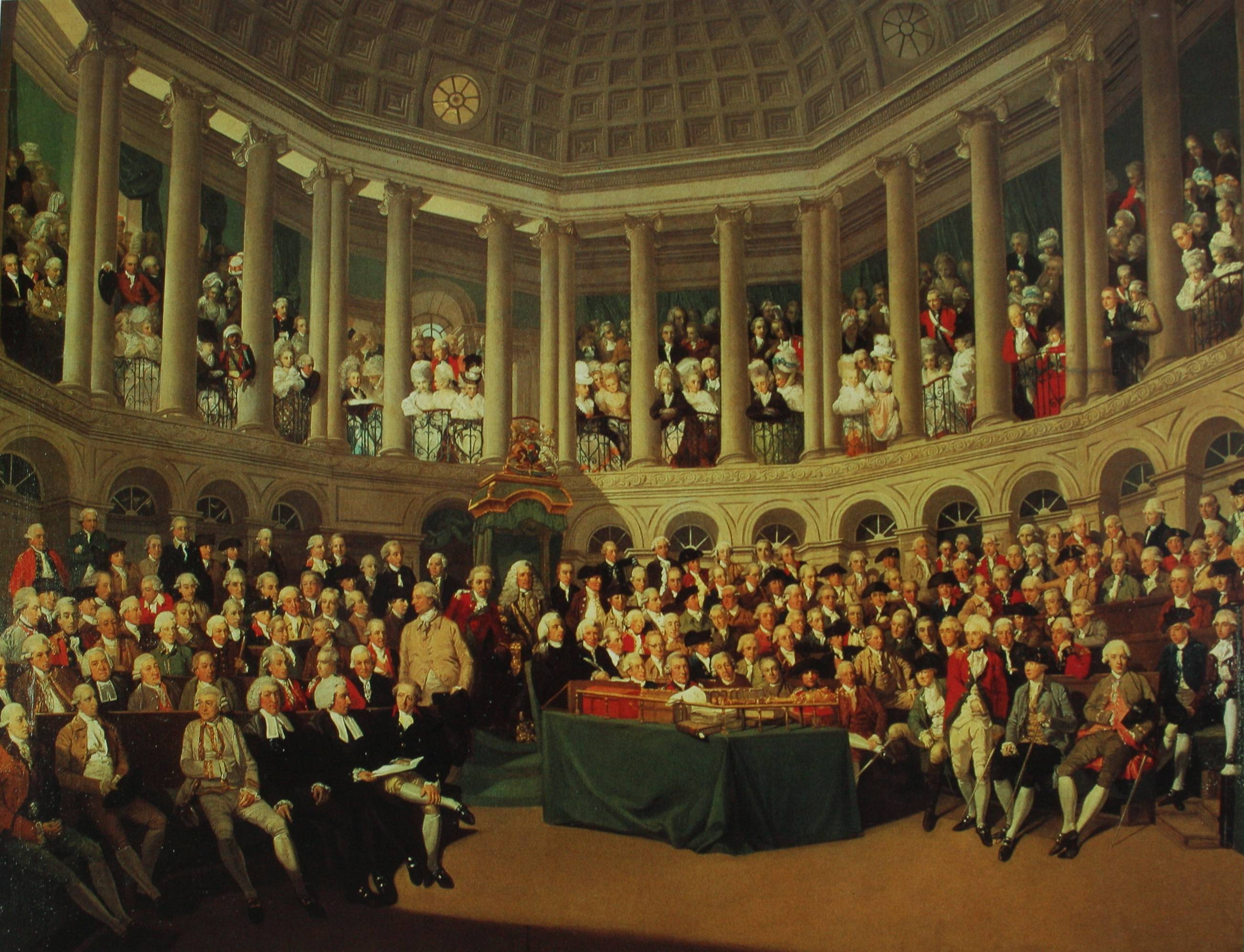
The Irish House of Commons, painted in the 1780s by Francis Wheatley.

- Repeal of the Education Act 1695: Roman Catholics may now send their children abroad to be educated; they may also now teach classes within Ireland.
- Parliament of Ireland passes the Anonymous Persons Act, introducing a form of limited liability to encourage commerce.
- Kildare Street Club founded in Dublin.

== Births ==
- 1 April – James Daly, 1st Baron Dunsandle and Clanconal, politician (died 1847).
- 26 July – John Field, composer and pianist (died 1837).
- 25 September – Charles Maturin, clergyman, novelist and playwright (died 1824).
- 29 September – Windham Quin, 2nd Earl of Dunraven and Mount-Earl, peer (died 1850).
- 11 November – Francis Blackburne, Lord Chancellor of Ireland (died 1867).
- 23 November – James FitzGibbon, British soldier and hero of the War of 1812 (died 1863).
  Full date unknown
  - Sir John Burke, 2nd Baronet, soldier and politician (died 1847).
  - James Hardiman, lawyer, librarian and historian (died 1855).
