= Robert Barber (seaman) =

British Sailer (1749–1783)

Robert Barber (1749 in Kilkenny, Ireland – 1783) was a quartermaster on HMS Adventure during Captain Cook's Second Voyage 1772–1775. On 1 January 1773 he became an able seaman.

Barber is known to have been master of HMS Mercury on 29 December 1779, HMS Jupiter on 12 October 1780, and HMS Princessa on 29 November 1780 which was the flagship of the blue squadron on 12 April 1782 at the Battle of the Saintes. He died in 1783 (aged 33–34) while still in the navy.
