= 1784 in Ireland =

- Centuries: 16th; 17th; 18th; 19th; 20th
- Decades: 1760s; 1770s; 1780s; 1790s; 1800s
- See also: Other events of 1784; List of years in Ireland

Events from the year 1784 in Ireland.

== Incumbent ==
- Monarch: George III

== Events ==
- 11 February – Royal College of Surgeons in Ireland chartered.
- 15 April – the first ascent of a manned balloon in the British Isles takes place with a hot air balloon at Navan
- The Old Bushmills Distillery becomes an officially registered company
- The post of Postmasters General of Ireland established
- William Conyngham begins installation of a planned settlement on Rutland Island, County Donegal
- New Church of Ireland St. John's Cathedral, Cashel, completed
- The satirist John Williams is prosecuted for an attack on the Duke of Rutland's administration in the Volunteers' Journal and flees the country

== Births ==
- 12 May – James Sheridan Knowles, dramatist and actor (died 1862).
- 20 September – Sir Richard John Griffith, 1st Baronet, geologist (died 1878).
  Full date unknown
  - Richard Church, soldier, military officer and general in the Greek Army (died 1873).
  - Thomas Barnwall Martin, soldier, landowner and politician (died 1847).

== Deaths ==
- 3 April – John Gore, 1st Baron Annaly, politician and peer (born 1718).
- 26 April – Nano Nagle, founder of the Presentation Sisters (born 1718).
- 29 May – George Barret, Sr., artist (born c.1730).
- Thomas Cooley, architect (born 1740 in England).
