= 30th Light Dragoons =

Cavalry regiment of the British Army

The 30th Light Dragoons was a cavalry regiment of the British Army. It was raised in October 1794 by Sir John Craven Carden. It was disbanded a short time after on 26 February 1796.
