= 1722 in Ireland =

- Centuries: 16th; 17th; 18th; 19th; 20th
- Decades: 1700s; 1710s; 1720s; 1730s; 1740s
- See also: Other events of 1722; List of years in Ireland

Events from the year 1722 in Ireland

== Incumbent ==
- Monarch: George I

== Events ==
- William Wood commences the minting (in London) of copper halfpence and farthings for circulation in Ireland.

== Births ==
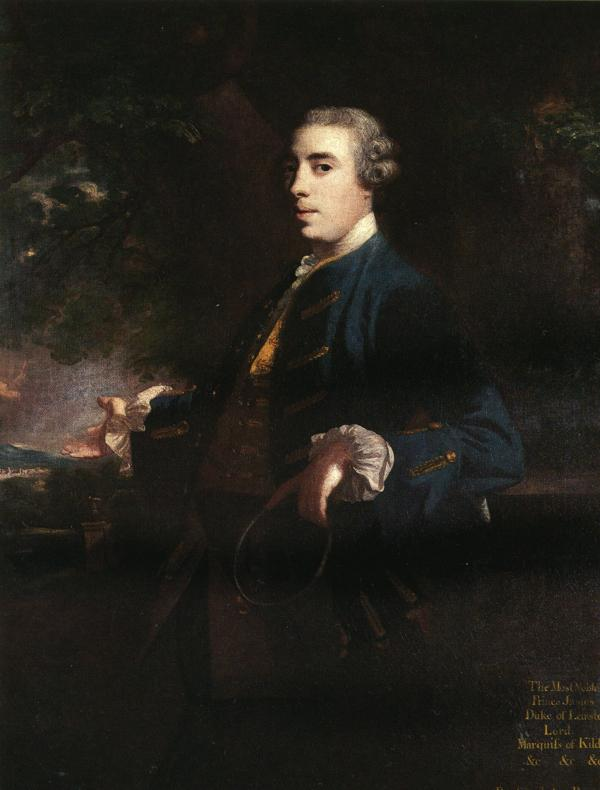
James FitzGerald

- May 29 – James FitzGerald, 1st Duke of Leinster, politician (d. 1773)
- Sir John Blackwood, 2nd Baronet, politician (d. 1799)

== Deaths ==
- March 11 – John Toland, philosopher (b. 1670)
