= 1791 in Ireland =

- Centuries: 16th; 17th; 18th; 19th; 20th
- Decades: 1770s; 1780s; 1790s; 1800s; 1810s
- See also: Other events of 1791; List of years in Ireland

Events from the year 1791 in Ireland.

== Incumbent ==
- Monarch: George III

== Events ==
- September – Wolfe Tone publishes Argument on Behalf of the Catholics of Ireland.
- 14 October – the Northern Whig Club, a group of nine Belfast Presbyterians, meets with Wolfe Tone and Thomas Russell and forms the Society of United Irishmen to press for liberal non-denominational parliamentary reform.
- 7 November – the Custom House, Dublin opens for business, having been completed under the supervision of James Gandon.

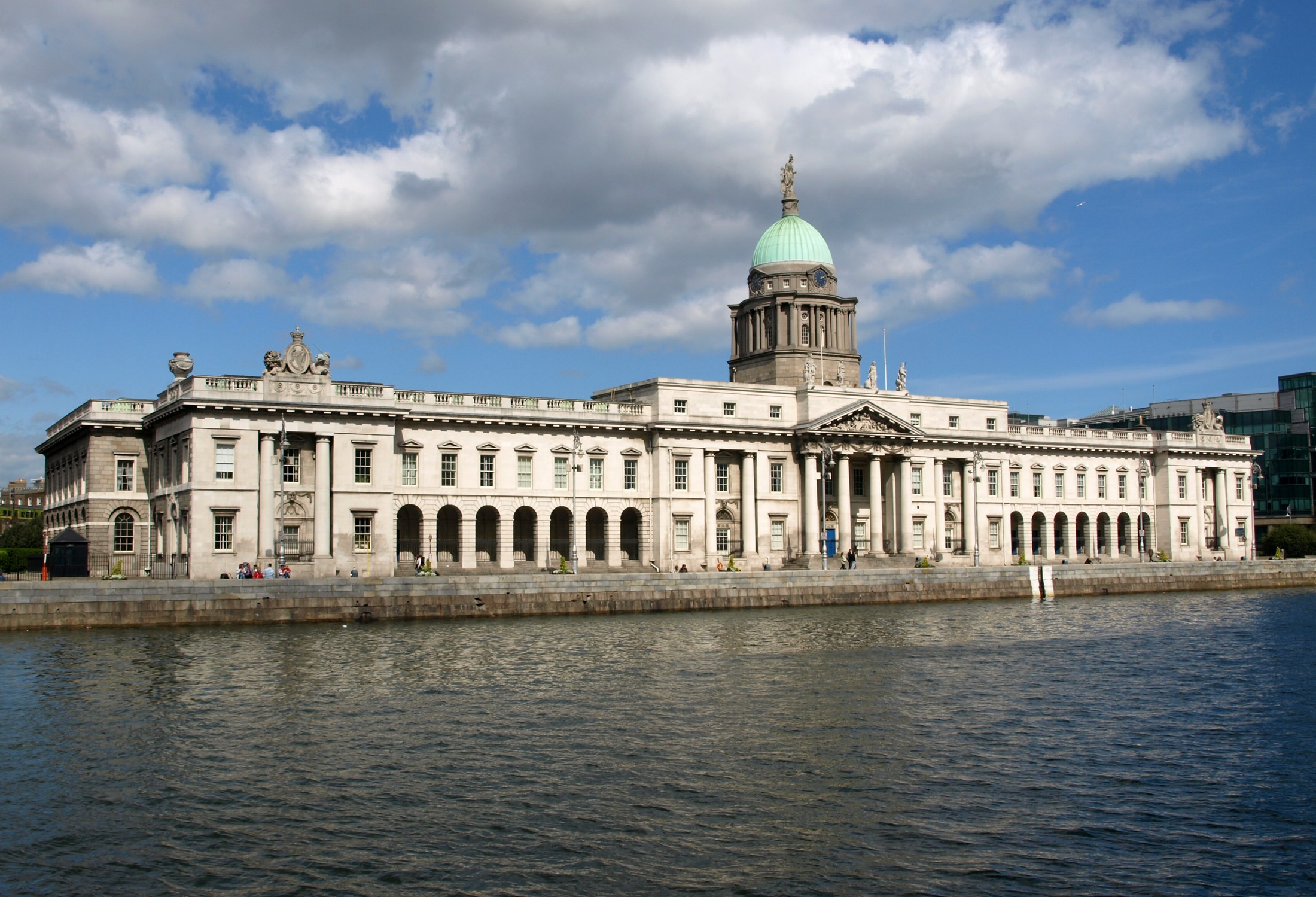
the Custom House, Dublin

- The Grand Canal opens to a junction with the Barrow at Athy.
- The first bridge across the River Foyle at Derry, built by the American Lemuel Cox in wood, is opened to vehicular traffic.

== Births ==
- 6 March – John MacHale, Roman Catholic Archbishop of Tuam, Irish Nationalist and writer (died 1881).
- 17 August – Richard Lalor Sheil, politician, writer and orator (died 1851).
- 14 December – Charles Wolfe, poet (died 1823).
  Full date unknown
  - James Graham, soldier, commended for his gallantry during the Battle of Waterloo (died 1845).

== Deaths ==
- 2 December – Henry Flood, statesman (born 1732).
  Full date unknown
  - George Bryan, businessman, statesman and politician in Pennsylvania (born 1731).
  - Robert Carver, artist (b. c1730).
