= 1786 in Ireland =

- Centuries: 16th; 17th; 18th; 19th; 20th
- Decades: 1760s; 1770s; 1780s; 1790s; 1800s
- See also: Other events of 1786; List of years in Ireland

Events from the year 1786 in Ireland.

== Incumbent ==
- Monarch: George III

== Events ==
- 13 March – Construction begins in Dublin on the Four Courts Building, with the first stone laid by the British Viceroy for Ireland, the Duke of Rutland.
- The Parliament of Ireland passes An Act for Promoting the Trade of Dublin, by rendering its Port and Harbour more commodious, creating the Corporation for Preserving and Improving the Port of Dublin (the "Ballast Board"), predecessor of the Commissioners of Irish Lights.
- The last reliably recorded wolf in Ireland is hunted down and killed near Mount Leinster, County Carlow, for killing sheep.

== Births ==
- 1 April – William Mulready, painter (died 1863).
- 7 May – John Cliffe Watts, military officer, architect in Australia (died 1873).
- 23 September – John England, first Catholic Bishop of Charleston, South Carolina (died 1842).
- 12 November – John Burke, genealogist (died 1848).
- Eaton Stannard Barrett, poet and author (died 1820).

== Deaths ==
- June – Gorges Edmond Howard, lawyer and writer (born 1715).
- October – John Handcock, soldier and politician (born 1755).
- 2 December – James O'Fallon, Roman Catholic Bishop of Elphin.
- "Fighting" George Robert FitzGerald, eccentric (hanged for murder).
