= 1941 in Ireland =

- Centuries: 18th; 19th; 20th; 21st
- Decades: 1920s; 1930s; 1940s; 1950s; 1960s
- See also: 1941 in Northern Ireland; Other events of 1941; List of years in Ireland

Events from the year 1941 in Ireland.

== Incumbents ==
- President: Douglas Hyde
- Taoiseach: Éamon de Valera (FF)
- Tánaiste: Seán T. O'Kelly (FF)
- Minister for Finance: Seán T. O'Kelly (FF)
- Chief Justice: Timothy Sullivan
- Dáil: 10th
- Seanad: 3rd

== Events ==
=== January ===
- 2 January – Three Carlow women were killed in a night of German bombing in parts of Leinster.
- 3 January – Further German bombing of Dublin.
- 13 January – The novelist and poet James Joyce died in Zürich.
- 24 January – Part of the old State Chambers in Dublin Castle were destroyed by fire.

=== February ===
- 20 February – The emergency Scientific Research Bureau was set up to seek alternatives to raw materials in short supply.
- 21 February – The first flight by a British Royal Air Force (RAF) flying boat took place through the "Donegal Corridor", Irish airspace between its base in Northern Ireland and the Atlantic Ocean, a concession secretly agreed by Éamon de Valera.

=== March ===
- 6 March – 3,800 animals were slaughtered after the 50th case of foot-and-mouth disease was announced.
- 20 March – Bread rationing was introduced.
- 21 March – The Glencullen (Capt. T. Waldron) and Glencree (Capt. D. McLean) were machine-gunned by the Luftwaffe in the Bristol Channel.
- 22 March: 16:00 hours – The collier St. Fintan (Capt. N. Hendry) was attacked by two Luftwaffe bombers off the coast of Pembrokeshire in Wales and sank with all hands – nine dead.
- 26 March – The Edenvale (Capt. T. Tyrrell) was bombed and machine-gunned by the Luftwaffe in the Bristol Channel.
- 27 March – The Lady Belle (Capt. T. Donohue) was bombed and machine-gunned by the Luftwaffe in the Irish Sea.

=== April ===
- 2 April – The Edenvale (Capt. T. Tyrrell) was bombed and machine-gunned (again) by the Luftwaffe in the Bristol Channel.
- 15 April – Belfast Blitz: A thousand people were killed in bombing raids on Belfast. Seventy-one firemen with 13 fire tenders from Dundalk, Drogheda, Dublin and Dún Laoghaire crossed the Irish border to assist their Belfast colleagues.
- 18 April – An RAF Handley Page Hampden aircraft (Registration AD730) got lost in bad weather and crashed on Black Hill (Kilbeg) above the village of Lacken, County Wicklow killing its entire crew of four.

=== May ===
- 5 May – Belfast suffered its third bombing raid during World War II. The Dublin government authorised its emergency services to assist.
- 7 May – Wages Standstill Order.
- 12 May – The Menapia (Capt C Bobels) was bombed and machine-gunned by the Luftwaffe off the Welsh coast: Two were wounded.
- 14 May – Five further outbreaks of foot-and-mouth disease were reported.
- 17 May – The Glenageary (Capt R. Simpson) was bombed and machine-gunned by the Luftwaffe in the Irish Sea.
- 19 May – The City of Waterford (Capt. W. Gibbons) was bombed and machine-gunned by the Luftwaffe off the Welsh coast: one person was wounded.
- 26 May – A special sitting of Dáil Éireann unanimously condemned the introduction of conscription in Northern Ireland.
- 27 May – Speaking in the House of Commons of the United Kingdom, Prime Minister Winston Churchill ruled out the introduction of conscription in Northern Ireland.
- 30 May – The Kyleclare (Capt. T. Hanrahan) was bombed off the Waterford coast.
- 31 May – Bombing of Dublin in World War II: Thirty-four people were killed when the Luftwaffe bombed part of Dublin.
- Summer – 16,000 men and boys were employed on county council turf-cutting schemes.

=== June ===
- 2 June – Arklow was bombed by the Luftwaffe, with no casualties.

=== July ===
- 24 July – Dundalk was bombed by the Luftwaffe, with no casualties.

=== August ===
- 22 August – The S.S. Clonlara (Capt. Joseph Reynolds) was torpedoed and sunk by U-564 in the North Atlantic while in Convoy OG 71 ("Nightmare Convoy"): 13 survivors and 11 dead.

=== September ===
- 16 September – Sixteen soldiers were killed and 20 were injured – 10 of them terribly – in the Glen of Imaal military training area in County Wicklow when an anti-tank mine exploded while they were receiving instruction in its use. It was the worst loss of life in the Irish Army during peacetime.

=== October ===
- 12 October – Charles Stewart Parnell, "the uncrowned King of Ireland," was honoured in a huge pageant in Dublin.

=== November ===
- November – Brendan Behan was released from Borstal in England and deported to Ireland.

=== December ===
- 8 December – The day after the attack on Pearl Harbor in Hawaii, Winston Churchill cabled the Taoiseach inviting him to join the Allies of World War II.

== Arts and literature ==
- Myles na gCopaleen's parodic novel An Béal Bocht was published.
- Donagh MacDonagh's Veterans, and other poems was published.
- Louis MacNeice's poetry Plant and Phantom and study The Poetry of W. B. Yeats were published.
- Kate O'Brien's novel The Land of Spices was published; it was prohibited in Ireland by the Censorship of Publications Board.
- English poet John Betjeman became the British press attaché in Dublin, living in Clondalkin.
- Opening of the new Dublin Airport passenger terminal, designed by Desmond FitzGerald, the first significant International Style building in Ireland.

== Sport ==
=== Association football ===
League of Ireland
Winners: Cork United
FAI Cup
Winners: Cork United 2–2, 3–1 Waterford.

=== Golf ===
- The Irish Open was not played due to The Emergency (the second world war period in Ireland).

== Births ==
- 3 January – Derrick O'Connor, actor (died 2018).
- 10 March – Pat Donnellan, Galway Gaelic footballer.
- 31 March – Jim O'Keeffe, Fine Gael party Teachta Dála (TD) for Cork South-West.
- 18 April – Michael D. Higgins, Labour Party TD, Cabinet Minister, and ninth President of Ireland.
- 22 May – Caitlín Maude, poet, actress and traditional singer (died 1982).
- 24 June – Gerard Clifford, Roman Catholic auxiliary bishop of the Archdiocese of Armagh.
- 24 July – Tony Dunne, association football player.
- 27 August – Paddy Barry, Cork hurler.
- 15 September – Tommy Carberry, National Hunt jockey and trainer (died 2017).
- 18 September – Michael Hartnett, poet (died 1999).
- 2 October – Donal Moynihan, Fianna Fáil party TD.
- 5 October – Phil Larkin, Kilkenny hurler.
- 13 October – Mick Doyle, rugby player and coach (died in car crash 2004).
- 20 October – Mike Murphy, television and radio broadcaster.
- 11 November – Eddie Keher, Kilkenny hurler.
- 23 November – Derek Mahon, poet (died 2020).
- 1 December – Fiachra Trench, musician and composer.
- 2 December – William Lee, Bishop of Waterford and Lismore (1993–2013).
- 10 December – Fionnula Flanagan, actress. (Fionnghuala Manon Flanagan)
  Full date unknown
  - Jonathan Bardon, historian and author.
  - James Coleman, installation and video artist.
  - Cyril Dunne, Galway Gaelic footballer.
  - Paddy Flanagan, cyclist (died 2000).
  - Eamon Grennan, poet.
  - Sean Matgamna, Trotskyist theorist.

== Deaths ==
- 6 January – F. R. Higgins, poet and theatre director (born 1896).
- 10 January – John Lavery, artist (born 1856).
- 13 January – James Joyce, novelist and poet (born 1882).
- 15 February – Andrew Jameson, public servant, businessman and Seanad member (born 1855).
- 19 February – Hamilton Harty, conductor and composer (born 1879).
- 13 March – Finlay Jackson, cricketer and rugby player (born 1901).
- 1 April – Jennie Wyse Power, member of the Seanad from 1922 to 1936.
- 19 May – Lola Ridge, anarchist poet and editor (born 1873).
- 4 July – William John English, recipient of the Victoria Cross for gallantry in 1901 at Vlakfontein, South Africa (born 1882).
- 19 August – John T. Browne, Mayor of Houston, Texas (born 1845).
- 9 September – William Gerard Barry, painter (born 1864).
- 11 September – John MacLoughlin, elected for nine years to Seanad from 1922 as an independent.
- 11 October – Mildred Anne Butler, painter (born 1858).
- 26 November – James Jackman, recipient of the Victoria Cross for gallantry in 1941 at Tobruk, Libya; killed in action the next day (born 1916).
  Full date unknown
  - Sidney Royse Lysaght, writer (born 1856).
