= 1929 in Ireland =

- Centuries: 18th; 19th; 20th; 21st
- Decades: 1900s; 1910s; 1920s; 1930s; 1940s
- See also: 1929 in Northern Ireland; Other events of 1929; List of years in Ireland

Events from the year 1929 in Ireland.

== Incumbents ==
- Governor-General: James McNeill
- President of the Executive Council: W. T. Cosgrave (CnaG)
- Vice-President of the Executive Council: Ernest Blythe (CnaG)
- Minister for Finance: Ernest Blythe (CnaG)
- Chief Justice: Hugh Kennedy
- Dáil: 6th
- Seanad: 1928 Seanad

== Events ==
- 17 January – all cats from abroad, except Great Britain, are to be kept in quarantine for a period of six months to avoid rabies.
- 8 February – a Belfast court sentences Fianna Fáil leader, Éamon de Valera, to one month in jail for illegally entering County Armagh.
- 20 February – Major-General Seán Mac Eoin, the Blacksmith of Ballinalee, is appointed Chief of Staff of the army.
- 12 May
  - After his resignation from the army Major-General Seán Mac Eoin receives the Cumann na nGaedheal nomination in the Sligo-Leitrim by-election.
  - Maud Gonne MacBride is arrested and charged with seditious libel against the State.
- 22 May – Northern Ireland general election for the Parliament of Northern Ireland, the first held following abolition of proportional representation and the redrawing of electoral boundaries to create single-seat territorial constituencies. The Ulster Unionist Party retains a substantial majority.
- 23 June – 300,000 people attend the Pontifical High Mass at the Phoenix Park to mark the end of the Catholic emancipation centenary celebrations.
- 11 July – the restored General Post Office, Dublin, is officially opened by President W. T. Cosgrave.
- 22 July – the Shannon hydro-electric scheme at Ardnacrusha, County Clare is opened.
- August – Censorship of Publications Act sets up the Censorship of Publications Board.
- 21 October – the Shannon Hydro-Electric Scheme is handed over to the ESB (Electricity Supply Board), bringing electricity to Galway and Dublin.
- 24 October – start of Wall Street crash; Ireland's economy suffers.
- Six banks in Northern Ireland begin to issue banknotes in sterling.
- Primary Certificate introduced, but optional, at end of primary education.
- Fordson tractor production is moved to Cork from the United States.
- Inishtrahull is depopulated (other than lighthouse keepers).

== Arts and literature ==
- 22 April – the first talking film, The Singing Fool starring Al Jolson, opens in the Capitol Theatre, Dublin.
- 3 July – Denis Johnston's The Old Lady Says "No!" is premièred by the Gate Theatre in Dublin, directed by Hilton Edwards.
- 29 November – Savoy Cinema opens in Dublin with the American colour talkie On with the Show.
- Elizabeth Bowen publishes her novel The Last September, set during the Irish War of Independence.
- Cecil Day-Lewis publishes Transitional Poem.
- Louis MacNeice publishes his poetry Blind Fireworks.
- Tomás Ó Criomhthain's autobiographical An t-Oileánach is published.
- Peadar O'Donnell publishes his novel Adrigool.
- George Bernard Shaw's political satire The Apple Cart is first performed (in Warsaw and Malvern).
- W. B. Yeats publishes his poetry A Packet for Ezra Pound and The Winding Stair.

== Sport ==
=== Football ===
- League of Ireland
  Winners: Shelbourne
  FAI Cup
  Winners: Shamrock Rovers 0–0, 3–0 Bohemians
- St Patrick's Athletic F.C. is founded

=== Gaelic Games ===
- The All-Ireland Champions are Cork (hurling) and Kerry (football).

=== Golf ===
- Irish Open is won by Abe Mitchell (England).

=== Motor racing ===
- Irish International Grand Prix is won by Boris Ivanowski (Alfa Romeo 6C)

== Births ==
- 9 January – Brian Farrell, author, journalist, academic and broadcaster (died 2014).
- 7 February
  - Norman Rodway, actor (died 2001).
  - Constance Smith, actress (died 2003).
- 10 February – Liam Ó Murchú, television broadcaster (died 2015).
- 14 February – Noel Lemass, Fianna Fáil TD (died 1976).
- 27 February – Richie Ryan, Fine Gael TD, Cabinet Minister and MEP (died 2019).
- 11 March – Erskine Barton Childers, writer and broadcaster (died 1996).
- 15 March – Paddy Buggy, Kilkenny hurler, President of the Gaelic Athletic Association (died 2013).
- 1 April – Michael O'Herlihy, television director (died 1997).
- 9 April – James McLoughlin, Roman Catholic Bishop of Galway (died 2005).
- 14 May – Brendan O'Reilly, broadcaster and actor (died 2001).
- 9 June – Shay Gibbons, international soccer player (died 2006).
- 11 July – David Kelly, actor (died 2012).
- 20 August – Kevin Heffernan, Gaelic footballer and manager (died 2013).
- 7 September – T. P. McKenna, character actor (died 2011).
- 9 September – Mervyn Jaffey, cricketer.
- 17 September – David Craig, Chief of the Air Staff (United Kingdom).
- 9 October – Michael Dargan, cricketer (died 2023).
- 10 October – Tim Sweeney, hurler (died 2018).
- 16 October – James Kelly, Irish Army officer cleared of attempting to import arms for the IRA in the 1970 Arms Trial (died 2003).
- 22 October – Camille Souter, English-born painter (died 2023).
- 28 October – Paddy Keaveney, Independent Fianna Fáil TD (died 1995).
- 14 November – Jimmy Gray, GAA sportsman (died 2023).
- 20 November – Ned Power, Waterford hurler (died 2007).
- 21 November – Niall Toibin, comedian and actor (died 2019).
- 23 December – Ouida Ramón-Moliner, anaesthetist (died 2020).

== Deaths ==
- February – Jim Connell, political activist, writer of The Red Flag (born 1852).
- 6 March – Thomas Taggart, politician in the United States (born 1856; died in U.S.)
- 15 March – Grace Rhys, novelist (born 1865; died in U.S.)
- 23 March – William Sears, newspaper proprietor, member of First Dáil representing South Mayo (Pro Treaty).
- 27 April – Austin Stack, Sinn Féin MP and TD, member of First Dáil (born 1879).
- 28 April – Alice Stopford Green, historian and nationalist, Independent member of the Seanad in 1922, 1925 and 1928 (born 1847).
- 29 April – Otto Jaffe, twice elected as Irish Unionist Party Lord Mayor of Belfast (born 1846).
- 1 May – Henry Jones Thaddeus, painter (born 1859; died on Isle of Wight).
- 28 May – Alice Stopford Green, nationalist, historian and journalist (born 1847).
- 5 July – Ted Sullivan, Major League Baseball player and manager (born 1851; died in U.S.)
- 12 July – Sir Nugent Everard, 1st Baronet soldier, Seanad member (born 1849).
- 11 August – Jer Doheny, Kilkenny hurler (born 1874).
- 10 October – Rose Mary Barton, watercolourist (born 1856).
- 19 October – Feardorcha Ó Conaill, Gaelic scholar (born 1876; died in traffic accident)
- 18 November – T. P. O'Connor, journalist and member of parliament (born 1848).
