= 1932 in Ireland =

- Centuries: 18th; 19th; 20th; 21st
- Decades: 1910s; 1920s; 1930s; 1940s; 1950s
- See also: 1932 in Northern Ireland; Other events of 1932; List of years in Ireland

Events from the year 1932 in Ireland.

== Incumbents ==
- Governor-General:
  - James McNeill (until 1 November 1932)
  - Domhnall Ua Buachalla (from 27 November 1932)
- President of the Executive Council:
  - W. T. Cosgrave (CnaG) (until 9 March 1932)
  - Éamon de Valera (FF) (from 9 March 1932)
- Vice-President of the Executive Council:
  - Ernest Blythe (CnaG) (until 9 March 1932)
  - Seán T. O'Kelly (FF) (from 9 March 1932)
- Minister for Finance:
  - Ernest Blythe (CnaG) (until 9 March 1932)
  - Seán MacEntee (FF) (from 9 March 1932)
- Chief Justice: Hugh Kennedy
- Dáil:
  - 6th (until 29 January 1932)
  - 7th (from 9 March 1932)
- Seanad: 1931 Seanad

== Events ==
- 6 January – sale of the pro-Fianna Fáil Derry Journal in Donegal is briefly prohibited.
- 29 January – Dáil Éireann is dissolved by the Governor-General, James McNeill, bringing ten years of Cumann na nGaedheal rule to an end.
- 16 February – 1932 Irish general election, results in formation of the first Fianna Fáil government under Éamon de Valera.
- March – meteorological observatory moved from Valentia Island to Westwood House near Cahirciveen.
- 8 March – members of the new Fianna Fáil government meet with members of the Labour Party to discuss unemployment, housing, the Oath and other issues.
- 9 March – Members of the 7th Dáil assemble.
- 10 March – one of the first actions of the new Fianna Fáil government is the release of 23 political prisoners.
- 18 March – the new government suspends the Public Safety Act, lifting the prohibition on a number of organisations including the Irish Republican Army. As a reaction to renewed IRA activity, former National Army Commandant Ned Cronin founds the Army Comrades Association, known as the Blueshirts.
- 31 March – Dublin Corporation is considering removing Nelson's Pillar from O'Connell Street, Dublin on the grounds that it is an obstruction to traffic.
- 19 May – the Constitution (Removal of Oath) Bill is passed in Dáil Éireann.
- 21 May – Amelia Earhart, the first woman to fly solo across the Atlantic, lands just outside Derry having taken 14 hours to cross the ocean.
- 9 June – Éamon de Valera and some members of his government leave for discussions with the British Government concerning the Ottawa Conference.
- 14 June – the first pictures of the atom-splitting apparatus are released. The machine was constructed by Dr. John Cockcroft and Dr. Ernest Walton of Trinity College Dublin.
- 21 June – ocean liners carrying thousands of pilgrims from the United States, Lapland and the Netherlands arrive in Irish ports for the Eucharistic Congress.
- 22 June – the 31st International Eucharistic Congress opens in Dublin Pro-Cathedral, the greatest gathering of Church dignitaries that Ireland has ever seen. The "Blue Hussars", the ceremonial Mounted Escort of the Irish Army, make their first public appearance as a guard of honour for the Papal Legate, Cardinal Lauri.
- 23 June – 2,000 men attend mass at a High Altar in the Phoenix Park.
- 24 June – 200,000 women are addressed by the Archbishop of Edinburgh at mass in the Phoenix Park.
- 26 June – almost a million worshippers attend Pontifical Mass in the Phoenix Park in the final ceremony of the Eucharistic Congress.
- 30 June – the third Tailteann Games open in Croke Park, Dublin.
- 1 August – at the Los Angeles Olympic Games, Bob Tisdall wins the 400-metre hurdles. Another Irishman, Dr. Pat O'Callaghan, wins gold in the hammer-throwing event.
- 18 August – Scottish aviator Jim Mollison takes off from Portmarnock Strand to become the first pilot to make an East-to-West solo transatlantic flight.
- 23 August – Cumann na nGaedheal leader W. T. Cosgrave criticises Fianna Fáil's policy of retaining the land annuities.
- 26 September – Éamon de Valera gives his inaugural speech as President of the League of Nations. He criticises complacent resolutions where the demand is for effective action.
- 9 October – at a Cumann na nGaedheal meeting in County Limerick batons are drawn and shots are fired as General Richard Mulcahy tries to address the crowd.
- 19 October – unemployed Dubliners march through the streets of Dublin to Leinster House where they hand in a petition to Seán T. O'Kelly.
- October – Anglo-Irish Trade War begins.
- 16 November – the Prince of Wales travels to Belfast for the first time to open the new parliament building at Stormont.
- 22 November – the new Northern Ireland Parliament building at Stormont is officially opened.
- 26 November – Domhnall Ua Buachalla succeeds James McNeill as Governor-General of the Irish Free State.

== Arts and literature ==
- 7 March – Dublin Corporation demands the return of the Hugh Lane pictures from the Tate Gallery in London.
- 22 March – Tarzan the Ape Man premieres in New Yord City, first of the classic film series co-starring Maureen O'Sullivan.
- Austin Clarke's first novel, The Bright Temptation: a romance, is prohibited in Ireland by the Censorship of Publications Board.
- Francis Stuart's novels Pigeon Irish and The Coloured Dome are published.
- W. B. Yeats leases Riversdale house in the Dublin suburb of Rathfarnham and publishes Words for Music Perhaps, and Other Poems.
- Seán Ó Faoláin publishes his first collection, Midsummer Night Madness and Other Stories, in London.
- Nineteen Irish writers led by Yeats and George Bernard Shaw form an Academy of Irish Letters primarily to oppose the Censorship of Publications Board.
- The first sound film made in Ireland, The Voice of Ireland, is directed by Col. Victor Haddick.
- American dancer Adele Astaire marries English aristocrat Lord Charles Cavendish (9 May) and they settle at Lismore Castle, one of the Devonshire family seats.

== Sport ==
=== Football ===
- League of Ireland
  Winners: Shamrock Rovers
  FAI Cup
  Winners: Shamrock Rovers 1 – 0 Dolphins

=== Golf ===
- Irish Open is won by Alf Padgham (England).

== Births ==
- 29 January – Bernard Cowen, Fianna Fáil TD and Minister of State (died 1984).
- 31 January – Pete St. John, born Peter Mooney, folk singer-songwriter (died 2022).
- 8 February – Raymond James Boland, Bishop of the Roman Catholic Diocese of Kansas City-Saint Joseph (died 2014).
- 28 February – Noel Cantwell, international soccer player (died 2005).
- 7 March – Johnny McGovern, Kilkenny hurler (died 2022).
- 10 March – Brigid Hogan-O'Higgins, Fine Gael TD (died 2022).
- 29 March – Richard Burke, Fine Gael politician and European Commissioner (died 2016).
- 1 June – Michael Lipper, Labour Party politician and TD (died 1987).
- 5 June
  - Christy Brown, author, painter and poet (died 1981).
  - Ronnie Dawson, rugby union.
- 12 June – Alfred Cooper, cricketer.
- 7 July – Eileen Lemass, Fianna Fáil TD and MEP.
- 20 July – Ronan Keane, Chief Justice of Ireland.
- 2 August – Peter O'Toole, actor (died 2013).
- 14 August – Denis Faul, monsignor, Northern Ireland civil rights activist, chaplain to prisoners in Maze Prison during 1981 Irish Hunger Strike (died 2006).
- 21 August – Gene Fitzgerald, Fianna Fáil TD and MEP (died 2007).
- 26 August – Dermot Curtis, soccer player.
- 18 October – Geraldine O'Grady, violinist (died 2025).
- 3 November – Albert Reynolds, Taoiseach and leader of Fianna Fáil (died 2014).
- 15 December – Edna O'Brien, novelist.
- 29 December – Eileen Desmond, Labour Party TD, Cabinet Minister, MEP and Seanad Éireann member (died 2005).
  Full date unknown
  - Barney Eastwood, boxing promoter (died 2020).
  - Anne Madden, painter (born in London).
  - Breandán Ó Madagáin, scholar and writer on traditional Irish song (died 2020).

== Deaths ==
- 1 January – J. J. Clancy, Sinn Féin TD, member of First Dáil (b. c. 1891).
- 1 January – Margaret Pearse, Fianna Fáil politician, mother of Patrick Pearse and Willie Pearse (born 1857).
- 17 January – Louis Brennan, inventor (born 1852).
- 8 February – Mad Dog Coll, mob hitman in New York (born 1908).
- 26 February – Robert Donovan, cricketer (born 1899).
- 4 March – James Henry Reynolds, recipient of the Victoria Cross for gallantry in 1879 at Rorke's Drift, South Africa (born 1844).
- 11 March – Thomas Hunter, member of First Dáil representing North East Cork (born 1883).
- 13 March – John Atkinson, Baron Atkinson, politician and judge, Attorney-General for Ireland and Law Lord (born 1844).
- 26 March – Horace Plunkett, politician, agricultural reformer and writer (born 1854).
- 22 May – Augusta, Lady Gregory, dramatist and folklorist (born 1852).
- 12 June – Catherine Coll, mother of Éamon de Valera (born 1858).
- 27 June – Arthur Godley, 1st Baron Kilbracken, civil servant, Permanent Under-Secretary of State for India (born 1847).
- 14 October – Katherine Plunket, botanical artist and oldest ever person both born and died in Ireland ever (born 1820).
