= 1930 in Ireland =

- Centuries: 18th; 19th; 20th; 21st
- Decades: 1910s; 1920s; 1930s; 1940s; 1950s
- See also: 1930 in Northern Ireland; Other events of 1930; List of years in Ireland

Events from the year 1930 in Ireland.

== Incumbents ==
- Governor-General: James McNeill
- President of the Executive Council: W. T. Cosgrave (CnaG)
- Vice-President of the Executive Council: Ernest Blythe (CnaG)
- Minister for Finance: Ernest Blythe (CnaG)
- Chief Justice: Hugh Kennedy
- Dáil: 6th
- Seanad: 1928 Seanad

== Events ==
- John Dulanty begins a 20-year spell as Ireland's High Commissioner (later, Ambassador) to London.
- 31 December – Mayo County Council is dissolved by ministerial order for refusing to appoint Miss Letitia Dunbar-Harrison to the position of county librarian on the grounds that she is a Protestant.

== Arts and literature ==
- 1 July – George Shiels' play The New Gossoon is premiered at the Abbey Theatre, Dublin.
- 28 August – a painting by the Dutch artist Rembrandt, found in an Irish cottage, is authenticated.
- 17 November – W. B. Yeats' 1-act play The Words Upon The Window Pane is premiered at the Abbey Theatre, Dublin.
- Samuel Beckett's first separately issued work, the poem Whoroscope, is published by Nancy Cunard's Hours Press in France.
- George Moore publishes Aphrodite in Aulis and A Flood.
- 'Æ' (George William Russell) publishes Enchantment, and Other Poems.

== Sport ==
=== Football ===
- League of Ireland
  Winners: Bohemians
  FAI Cup
  Winners: Shamrock Rovers 1 – 0 Brideville

=== Golf ===
- Irish Open is won by Charles Whitcombe (England).

=== Motor racing ===
- Irish International Grand Prix is won by Rudolf Caracciola (Mercedes-Benz SSK)

== Births ==
- 4 January – Tras Honan, Fianna Fáil politician, twice Cathaoirleach of Seanad Éireann
- 7 January – Justin Keating, senior Irish Labour Party politician, Teachta Dála, Cabinet Minister, Member of the European Parliament and member of Seanad Éireann (died 2009)
- 12 January – Jennifer Johnston, novelist and playwright
- 18 January – Breandán Ó hEithir, journalist and broadcaster working in Irish and English languages (died 1990)
- 22 February – David Cremin, Bishop Emeritus of the Roman Catholic Archdiocese of Sydney
- 30 March – Fergus O'Brien, Fine Gael TD and Minister of State
- 13 March – Don Cockburn, television newsreader (died 2017)
- 1 April – Frank Cluskey, leader of the Irish Labour Party (died 1989)
- 12 April – Patrick Pery, 6th Earl of Limerick, peer and public servant (died 2003)
- 26 April – Jack Fitzsimons, architect, member of Seanad Éireann and campaigner (died 2014)
- 10 May – William McDermott, Bishop of the Roman Catholic Diocese of Huancavélica, Peru
- 13 June – Billy Ringrose, equestrian (died 2020)
- 27 June – Enda McDonagh, priest (died 2021)
- 28 June – William C. Campbell, parasitologist, recipient of the Nobel Prize in Physiology or Medicine
- 2 July – Maeve Kelly, writer (died 2025)
- 13 August – Frank Durkan, lawyer in the United States (died 2006)
- 19 August – Frank McCourt, teacher and writer (died 2009)
- 29 August – Mícheál Ó Muircheartaigh, Gaelic games commentator for Radio Telifís Éireann
- 30 August – Kieran Crotty, Fine Gael TD
- 9 September – Des Hanafin, Fianna Fáil politician, member of Seanad Éireann (died 2017)
- 14 September – George Eogan, archaeologist, member of Seanad Éireann (died 2021)
- 26 September – Joe Sherlock, Labour Party TD (died 2007)
- 1 October – Richard Harris, actor (died 2002)
- 5 October – Sean Potts, tin whistle player with The Chieftains (died 2014)
- 11 October – Joan O'Hara, actress (died 2007)
- 22 October – Philomena Lynott, entrepreneur and memoirist (died 2019)
- 23 October – Thomas Flanagan, Auxiliary Bishop of the Diocese of San Antonio (died 2019)
- 4 November – Gerry Duffy, cricketer
- 17 November – Brian Lenihan, Fianna Fáil TD, Cabinet Minister, senator and presidential candidate (died 1995)
- 15 December – Edna O'Brien, novelist and short story writer (died 2024)
  Full date unknown
  - Edward Delaney, sculptor
  - Seán Ó Coisdealbha, poet, playwright and actor (died 2006)
  - Bertie Troy, priest, hurler and All-Ireland winning manager with Cork (died 2007)

== Deaths ==
- 26 September – Dick Fitzgerald, Kerry Gaelic footballer (born 1882)
- 29 September – Bryan Mahon, British Army general, Commander-in-Chief, Ireland and Senator (born 1862)
- 1 October – James Whiteside McCay, Lieutenant General in the Australian Army, member of the Victorian and Australian Parliaments (born 1864)
- 31 October – Pierce Charles de Lacy O'Mahony, Nationalist politician, barrister and philanthropist (born 1850)
- 30 November – Mary Harris "Mother" Jones, labor and community organizer, member of the Industrial Workers of the World, and socialist in the United States (born 1830)
