= 1924 in Ireland =

- Centuries: 18th; 19th; 20th; 21st
- Decades: 1900s; 1910s; 1920s; 1930s; 1940s
- See also: 1924 in Northern Ireland; Other events of 1924; List of years in Ireland

Events from the year 1924 in Ireland.

== Incumbents ==
- Governor-General: Tim Healy
- President of the Executive Council: W. T. Cosgrave (CnaG)
- Vice-President of the Executive Council: Kevin O'Higgins (CnaG)
- Minister for Finance: Ernest Blythe (CnaG)
- Chief Justice: Hugh Kennedy (from 24 June 1924)
- Dáil: 4th
- Seanad: 1922 Seanad

== Events ==
- 15 January – The last internee at Kilmainham Gaol, Ernie O'Malley, was transferred to St. Bricin's Military Hospital.
- 7–18 March – A crisis occurred in the National Army, the Irish Army Mutiny, over proposals to reduce the army's size after the Irish Civil War. It was led by Liam Tobin's Irish Republican Army Organisation. The outcome affirmed subservience of the military to the civilian government.
- 20 April – Sinn Féin commemorated the eighth anniversary of the events of the 1916 Easter Rising.
- 24 April – No agreement was reached at the Boundary Conference in London. The Irish Boundary Commission was then set up to examine the border between the Irish Free State and Northern Ireland.
- 5 May – Dublin Corporation officially renamed Sackville Street to O'Connell Street.
- 6 May – James Craig refused to nominate a Northern Ireland representative to the Boundary Commission.
- 30 May – A new licensing bill was introduced by the Minister for Justice, Kevin O'Higgins. Bars were allowed to open between 9 a.m. and 10 p.m., and the sale of alcohol was limited to those over the age of 18.
- 5 June – In an austerity budget, the Minister for Finance, the only Northern Ireland Protestant to serve on a Republic of Ireland cabinet, Ernest Blythe brought in the Old Age Pensions Act 1924, which cut the pension by ten percent, from ten shillings to nine shillings (ten shillings being the equivalent of £181 in 2014). Blythe's action is remembered with bitterness in Ireland .
- 3 July – The Minister for Education, Eoin MacNeill, announced that the teaching of Irish was to be made compulsory in all schools.
- 2–18 August – Tailteann Games were held in Dublin.
- 18 August – Ireland's first rodeo opened at Croke Park.
- 1 October – The Defence Forces were established, incorporating the National Army.
- 24 October – Éamon de Valera was arrested at Newry Town Hall for defying an order preventing him from speaking in Northern Ireland.
- 7 November – The President of the Executive Council, W. T. Cosgrave, announced an amnesty for criminal acts committed during the Civil War in connection with the attempt to overthrow the lawfully established government.
- 19 November – Cardinal Michael Logue, Archbishop of Armagh and Primate of All Ireland, died, having held office since 1887, and was succeeded by Patrick O'Donnell.
- 19 December – Dáil Éireann passed the Intoxicating Liquor Act. The law reduced pub opening hours, and closed them on Saint Patrick's Day, Good Friday, and Christmas Day.
- Undated – Urney Chocolates moved to the disused World War I era RAF airfield of Tallaght Aerodrome, County Dublin. The site had been handed over to the Irish Air Service in May 1922.

== Arts and literature ==
- 3 March – Seán O'Casey's drama Juno and the Paycock opened at the Abbey Theatre, Dublin.
- May – In the Art competitions at the 1924 Summer Olympics in Paris, Jack Butler Yeats won a silver medal for the painting Swimming (later known as The Liffey Swim).
- December – The Irish Naturalist ceases publication
- Donn Byrne published the novel, Blind Raftery and His Wife Hilaria.
- Daniel Corkery published a study of 18th century Irish poetry, The Hidden Ireland.
- George Moore published the novel, Peronnik the Fool.
- Liam O'Flaherty published his short story collection, Spring Sowing.
- W. B. Yeats published the drama, The Cat and the Moon, and Certain Poems.
- Eileen Gray began work with Jean Badovici on their modernist villa E-1027 at Roquebrune-Cap-Martin in the south of France.
- Mainie Jellett and Evie Hone staged an exhibition of their abstract art in Dublin.

== Sport ==
=== Association football ===
- League of Ireland
  Winners: Bohemians
  FAI Cup
  Winners: Athlone Town 1–0 Fordsons (played on 17 March at Dalymount Park, Dublin)

=== Gaelic football ===
1924 All-Ireland Senior Football Championship: Kerry won but the final was not played in 1924.

- September – Dublin beat Kerry at Croke Park, Dublin, in the 1923 All-Ireland SFC final.

=== Hurling ===
1924 All-Ireland Senior Hurling Championship:

- 14 December – Dublin beat Galway at Croke Park, Dublin. The delayed 1923 All-Ireland SHC final was played three months before that.

== Births ==
- January – Rena Dardis, publisher.
- 14 January – Francis Gerard Brooks, Bishop of Dromore (1976–1979; died 2010).
- 25 January – Tomás Mac Giolla, Teachta Dála (TD) and leader of the Workers' Party (died 2010).
- 28 January – Sonny Hool, cricketer (died 1988).
- 8 March – Sean McClory, actor (died 2003).
- 13 March – Myrtle Allen, chef (died 2018).
- 26 May – Sheelagh Murnaghan, only Ulster Liberal Party Member of Parliament at Stormont (died 1993).
- 30 May – Tom Leonard, Fianna Fáil party TD (died 2004).
- 26 June – Dermot Ryan, Roman Catholic Archbishop of Dublin (died 1985).
- 14 July – Mick Kennefick, Cork hurler (died 1982).
- 3 August – Jim Gibbons, Fianna Fáil TD, Member of the European Parliament and Cabinet Minister (died 1997).
- 14 August – Maeve Hillery, anaesthetist and wife of the sixth President of Ireland, Patrick Hillery.
- 21 August – David Marcus, writer (died 2009).
- 7 September – Donal Creed, Fine Gael party TD and Member of the European Parliament (died 2017).
- 5 October – Kieron Moore, actor (died 2007).
- 29 October – Tom Clancy, singer.
- 21 December – Christy O'Connor Snr, golfer (died 2016).
- Approximate date – George Redmond, Assistant City and County Manager in Dublin, accused of corruption (died 2016).

== Deaths ==
- 29 March – Charles Villiers Stanford, composer (born 1852).
- 18 May – James Bernard, 4th Earl of Bandon, Deputy Lieutenant in Ireland (born 1850).
- 26 May – Victor Herbert, composer, cellist and conductor (born 1859).
- 5 June – William Hare, 3rd Earl of Listowel, peer and Liberal politician (born 1833).
- 6 June – William Pirrie, 1st Viscount Pirrie, shipbuilder and businessman (born 1847; died at sea).
- 20 June – James Nowlan, President of the Gaelic Athletic Association (1901–1921) (born 1855).
- 22 October – Anne Marjorie Robinson, painter (born 1858).
- 12 December – William Carrigan, Canon of the Diocese of Ossory and historian (born 1860).
