= 1927 in Ireland =

- Centuries: 18th; 19th; 20th; 21st
- Decades: 1900s; 1910s; 1920s; 1930s; 1940s
- See also: 1927 in Northern Ireland; Other events of 1927; List of years in Ireland

Events from the year 1927 in Ireland.

== Incumbents ==
- Governor-General: Tim Healy
- President of the Executive Council: W. T. Cosgrave (CnaG)
- Vice-President of the Executive Council:
  - Kevin O'Higgins (CnaG) (until 10 July 1927)
  - Ernest Blythe (CnaG) (from 14 July 1927)
- Minister for Finance: Ernest Blythe (CnaG)
- Chief Justice: Hugh Kennedy
- Dáil:
  - 4th (until 20 May 1927)
  - 5th (from 23 June 1927 until 25 August 1927)
  - 6th (from 11 October 1927)
- Seanad: 1925 Seanad

== Events ==
- 6 April – Dan Breen proposes a Bill in the Dáil that Article 17 of the Irish Free State Constitution be removed. President W. T. Cosgrave opposes the removal of the Oath of Allegiance to the British Crown.
- 13 April – delegates at the annual conference of the Farmers' Party reject proposals to merge with Cumann na nGaedheal.
- 18 April – Celtic Park in Belfast is opened. It is the first greyhound track in Ireland.
- 20 May – the Intoxicating Liquor Act requires bars to be closed all day on Christmas Day and Good Friday.
- 4 June – the results of the general election are a hung Dáil, with Fianna Fáil entering the Dáil for the first time and removing Cumann na nGaedheal's majority.
- 20 June – in a radio broadcast, the leader of Fianna Fáil, Éamon de Valera, says that the results of the general election prove that the people of Ireland want to get rid of the Oath of Allegiance.
- 29 June – a morning Solar eclipse takes place across Ireland.
- 10 July – Kevin O'Higgins, Vice-President of the Executive Council and Minister for Justice, is assassinated by the anti-Treaty Irish Republican Army in Dublin.
- 15 July – Constance Markievicz (née Gore-Booth) dies aged 59 in Dublin. She was an officer in the Irish Citizen Army, taking part in the Easter Rising; the first woman elected to the British House of Commons, though she did not take her seat; and the first female Irish cabinet minister.
- 28 July – Ireland's first automatic telephone exchange is opened in Dublin.
- 1 August – the Electricity Supply Board (ESB) is appointed as an offshoot of the Shannon Scheme.
- 3 August – Mary Bailey becomes the first woman to pilot an aeroplane across the Irish Sea.
- 11 August – following changes to the electoral laws Fianna Fáil Teachtaí Dála arrive at Leinster House for the first time. They take the Oath of Allegiance, dismissing it as an "empty formula".
- 15 September – a new general election is called due to the hung Dáil; again it is very close, with Cumann na nGaedheal winning 62 seats, Fianna Fáil 57, Labour 13, the Farmers' Party 6, National League Party 2, and the Irish Worker League just one – James Larkin.
- c. October – the Agricultural Credit Corporation is set up to encourage investment in agriculture.
- 28 October – Cleggan Bay Disaster: A strong gale kills 45 fishermen off the coast of County Galway, leading to abandonment of the Inishkea Islands.
- November – Ernest Bewley opens his Grafton Street café in Dublin.
- Undated – The Industrial and Commercial Property Registration Office (re-designated the Patents Office by the Patents Act 1964) is established at 45 Merrion Square, Dublin.

== Arts and literature ==
- Ina Boyle completes her Symphony No. 1, Glencree ("In the Wicklow Hills"), but it will not be premiered until 1945.
- James Joyce's Pomes Penyeach is published in Paris.
- W. B. Yeats' October Blast (including "Among School Children") and Stories of Red Hanrahan and the Secret Rose are published in the UK.

== Sport ==
=== Football ===
- International Games
  23 April: Ireland 1–2 Italy 'B'
  League of Ireland
  Winners: Shamrock Rovers
  FAI Cup
  Winners: Drumcondra 1–1, 1–0 Brideville

=== Gaelic Games ===
- The All-Ireland Champions are Dublin (hurling) and Kildare (football).

=== Golf ===
- Irish Open is won by George Duncan (Scotland).

=== Greyhound Racing ===
- 18 April: the first greyhound racing track in Ireland opens at Celtic Park (Belfast).

== Births ==
- 8 January – Tim Flood, hurler (died 2014)
- 15 January – Michael Barrett, Fianna Fáil TD (died 2006)
- 17 January - John A. Murphy, historian and senator (died 2022)
- 20 January – John O'Connell, Labour Party TD, Cabinet Minister, Ceann Comhairle of Dáil Éireann and MEP (died 2013).
- 3 February – Val Doonican, popular singer (died 2015).
- 5 February – John S. Beckett, musician, composer and conductor (died 2007).
- 16 February – Pearse Hutchinson, poet, broadcaster and translator (born in Glasgow; died 2012).
- 3 March – Aidan Higgins, writer.
- 20 March – Cairbre (also known as Leo), lion mascot.
- 24 April – Eamon Casey, Bishop of Galway, 1976–1992 (died 2017).
- 8 July
  - Maurice Hayes, public servant, independent member of Seanad Éireann (died 2017).
  - John McAndrew, Mayo Gaelic footballer, doctor and greyhound trainer (died 2013).
- 26 July – Danny La Rue, born Daniel Patrick Carroll, female impersonator (died 2009).
- 2 August – Veronica Dunne, soprano (died 2021)
- 6 August – Richard Murphy, poet.
- 15 August – Patrick Galvin, poet and dramatist (died 2011).
- 25 September – Gordon Wilson, peace campaigner (died 1995).
- 9 October – Frank O'Farrell, soccer player and manager.
- 14 October – Alf Ringstead, soccer player (died 2000).
- 4 December – Pat Daly, soccer player.
- Imogen Stuart, sculptor (born in Germany).

== Deaths ==
- 6 February – Sam Maguire, Irish Republican and Gaelic footballer (born 1877).
- 25 February – David Baird, United States Senator from New Jersey from 1918 to 1919 (born 1839).
- 9 March – Martin Fitzgerald, elected to Seanad in 1922 and 1925.
- 22 April – Robert John McConnell, businessman, baronet and Lord Mayor of Belfast (born 1853).
- 3 May – Tom Gallaher, tobacco manufacturer (born 1840).
- 1 June – J. B. Bury, historian, classical scholar and philologist (born 1861).
- 3 June – Henry Petty-Fitzmaurice, 5th Marquess of Lansdowne, British statesman and colonial administrator (died 1927 in Ireland)
- 10 July – Kevin O'Higgins, Minister for Justice, assassinated by the Irish Republican Army (born 1892).
- 15 July – Constance Markievicz (née Gore-Booth), Sinn Féin and Fianna Fáil TD, member of First Dáil, cabinet minister (born 1868).
- 22 July – Martin Morris, 2nd Baron Killanin, barrister and politician (born 1867).
- 4 August – John Dillon, land reform agitator, Irish Home Rule activist, nationalist politician, MP and last leader of the Irish Parliamentary Party (in London) (born 1851).
- 5 August
  - Joseph O'Mara, opera singer (born 1864).
  - Henry Prittie, 4th Baron Dunalley, peer and Lord Lieutenant of County Tipperary 1905–1922 (born 1851).
- 3 October – Gerald Carew, 5th Baron Carew (born 1860).
- 7 October – Edward Guinness, 1st Earl of Iveagh, philanthropist and businessman (born 1847).
- 16 October – Sir Henry Robinson, 1st Baronet, civil servant (born 1857).
- 22 November – Patrick O'Donnell, Cardinal, Archbishop of Armagh and Primate of All Ireland (born 1856).
- 31 December – Dermot Bourke, 7th Earl of Mayo, served in Seanad from 1922 to 1927 (born 1851).
