= 1934 in Ireland =

- Centuries: 18th; 19th; 20th; 21st
- Decades: 1910s; 1920s; 1930s; 1940s; 1950s
- See also: 1934 in Northern Ireland; Other events of 1934; List of years in Ireland

Events from the year 1934 in Ireland.

== Incumbents ==
- Governor-General: Domhnall Ua Buachalla
- President of the Executive Council: Éamon de Valera (FF)
- Vice-President of the Executive Council: Seán T. O'Kelly (FF)
- Minister for Finance: Seán MacEntee (FF)
- Chief Justice: Hugh Kennedy
- Dáil: 8th
- Seanad:
  - 1931 Seanad (until 5 December 1934)
  - 1934 Seanad (from 12 December 1934)

== Events ==
- 12 January – Republican Press Ltd takes a High Court action against the Garda Síochána over the seizure of the An Phoblacht newspaper.
- 20 January – the funeral of the veteran nationalist Member of Parliament Joseph Devlin takes place in Belfast.
- 5 February – Dublin Corporation debates a letter from the Gaelic League asking for a ban on the broadcast of jazz music on the grounds that it is contrary to the spirit of Christianity and nationality.
- 7 February – discussions on the formation of a new Volunteer Force leads to an explosive debate in the Dáil. Civil War events are revisited and there are angry exchanges between deputies.
- 23 February – the Government introduces the Wearing of Uniform (Restriction) Bill 1934. Cumann na nGaedheal opposes what is soon dubbed The Blueshirts Bill.
- 26 February – 300 pupils from the Christian Brothers schools in Thurles go on strike as a protest against the wearing of blue shirts by a number of their classmates. They parade through the town singing "The Soldiers Song".
- 2 March – the Wearing of Uniform (Restriction) Bill is carried in the Dáil by 80 votes to 60. W. T. Cosgrave condemns the Bill and predicts its failure.
- 10 March – the National Athletic and Cycling Association decides to ban women from taking part in events and meetings.
- 17 March – a socialist motion put to the Irish Republican Army convention in Dublin is lost.
- 18 March – General Eoin O'Duffy addresses 2,500 Blueshirts in Trim Market Square.
- 27 March – the Irish Hospitals' Sweepstake receives a blow when the Betting and Lotteries Act is passed by the Parliament of the United Kingdom, prohibiting the sale of lottery tickets in the UK.
- 7–8 April – Republican Congress first meets in Athlone, formed from disaffected socialist ex-members of the Irish Republican Army.
- 9 April – W. W. McDowell, US Minister to Ireland, dies at a State banquet in his honour at Dublin Castle, between President Éamon de Valera and Mrs Sinéad de Valera.
- 2 May – an application to obtain permission for deposed Soviet leader Leon Trotsky to live in Ireland has failed.
- August–October – newspaper strike in Dublin.
- 13 August - the Copley Street riot occurs, leading to a clash between the Broy Harriers and the Blueshirts that leaves one person dead.
- 29–30 September – the Republican Congress, at its first annual meeting (held at Rathmines), suffers a split on policy.
- December – Republicans demonstrate against the screening at the Savoy Cinema in Dublin of a newsreel of the marriage of Prince George, Duke of Kent, to Princess Marina.

== Arts and literature ==
- 3 March – the third Theatre Royal, Dublin, closes.
- 6 April – W. B. Yeats shares the Gothenburg Prize for Poetry.
- August–January – Brian O'Nolan publishes the magazine Blather in Dublin.
- 18 October – release of Robert J. Flaherty's fictional documentary film Man of Aran in the United States.
- Adolf Mahr is appointed Director of the National Museum of Ireland in Dublin.
- Samuel Beckett publishes his prose collection More Pricks Than Kicks.
- Patricia Lynch publishes her children's book The Turf-Cutter's Donkey: An Irish Story of Mystery and Adventure.
- Francis MacManus publishes his first novel Stand and Give Challenge in Dublin.
- Kate O'Brien publishes her novel The Ante-Room.
- W. B. Yeats publishes his poetry The King of the Great Clock Tower.

== Sport ==
=== Football ===
- League of Ireland
  Winners: Bohemians
  FAI Cup
  Winners: Cork 2–1 St James' Gate

=== Golf ===
- Irish Open is won by Syd Easterbrook (England).

== Births ==
- 12 January – Edmond Carmody, Roman Catholic bishop in the Diocese of Corpus Christi.
- 21 January – Audrey Dalton, actress.
- 3 February – Joseph Duffy, Roman Catholic Bishop of Clogher.
- 4 February – Tom Cheasty, Waterford hurler (died 2007).
- 7 February – Rory O'Hanlon, Fianna Fáil TD for Cavan–Monaghan, Cabinet Minister and Ceann Comhairle of Dáil Éireann.
- 6 March – Mella Carroll, judge of the High Court (died 2006).
- 7 March – Seán Garland, politician (died 2018)
- 1 May – Rory Kiely, Fianna Fáil Senator, Cathaoirleach of Seanad Éireann 2002–2007.
- 4 May – Patrick O'Donoghue, fifth Roman Catholic Bishop of Lancaster in England.
- 3 May – Larry Gogan, radio disc jockey (died 2020).
- 19 May – Mark Hely-Hutchinson, son of 7th Earl of Donoughmore, chief executive of Guinness Ireland and group chief executive, Bank of Ireland (1983–1991).
- 29 May – Mick Meagan, football player and manager.
- 4 June – Seamus Elliott, road bicycle racer (died 1971).
- 7 July – Robert McNeill Alexander, zoologist, authority on animal locomotion (died 2016).
- 13 July – Brian McCracken, Justice of the Supreme Court, sole member of The McCracken Tribunal into certain payments by Ben Dunne to Charles Haughey and Michael Lowry.
- 29 July – Patrick Coveney, Roman Catholic Archbishop.
- 30 July – Kathleen O'Connor, teacher, Clann na Poblachta TD for Kerry North and the youngest ever woman elected to Dáil Éireann (at a by-election in 1956) (died 2017).
- 31 July – Fergus Bourke, photographer (died 2004).
- 5 August – Gay Byrne, broadcaster, host of The Late Late Show (died 2019).
- 25 August – Michael Lynch, Fianna Fáil TD and senator (died 2019).
- 16 September – Ronnie Drew, singer and folk musician, with The Dubliners (died 2008).
- 23 September – Thomas Kilroy, playwright and novelist.
- October 17 - Kathleen Watkins, broadcaster and actress (died 2024).
- 26 October – Walton Empey, Archbishop of Dublin (Church of Ireland), Primate of Ireland (1996–2002).
- 30 October – Noel Dwyer, soccer player (died 1993).
- 12 November – John McGahern, writer (died 2006).
- 14 November – Catherine McGuinness, Justice of the Supreme Court, High Court and Circuit Court, Senior Counsel and Senator.
- 2 December
  - Harry Perry, welterweight Olympic boxer (died 2021).
  - Brian Phelan, actor, screenwriter and dramatist (died 2024).
- Full date unknown
  - John Bennett, Cork hurler.
  - Francis John Byrne, historian (died 2017).
  - Johnny Clifford, Cork hurler (died 2007).

== Deaths ==
- 1 January – John Crowley, medical doctor, member First Dáil representing North Mayo (born 1870).
- 18 January – Joseph Devlin, Nationalist politician and MP in the British House of Commons and in the Northern Ireland House of Commons (born 1872).
- April – Robert McCall, lawyer (born 1849).
- 29 September – Patrick S. Dinneen, lexicographer and historian (born 1860).
- 28 November
  - Seán O'Mahony, Sinn Féin MP (born 1872).
  - George F. O'Shaunessy, Democrat U.S. Representative from Rhode Island (born 1868).
- 3 December – Charles James O'Donnell, colonial administrator and MP (born 1849).
- Full date unknown – Nathaniel Hill, impressionist painter (born 1861).
