= 1931 in Ireland =

- Centuries: 18th; 19th; 20th; 21st
- Decades: 1910s; 1920s; 1930s; 1940s; 1950s
- See also: 1931 in Northern Ireland; Other events of 1931; List of years in Ireland

Events from the year 1931 in Ireland.

== Incumbents ==
- Governor-General: James McNeill
- President of the Executive Council: W. T. Cosgrave (CnaG)
- Vice-President of the Executive Council: Ernest Blythe (CnaG)
- Minister for Finance: Ernest Blythe (CnaG)
- Chief Justice: Hugh Kennedy
- Dáil: 6th
- Seanad:
  - 1928 Seanad (until 5 December 1931)
  - 1931 Seanad (from 6 December 1931)

== Events ==
- 9 January – Ulster Canal abandoned.
- 12 February – sixteen members of the Ennis Dalcassian Gaelic Athletic Association club are expelled for attending the Ennis-Nenagh rugby match.
- 17 March – first St. Patrick's Day parade held in the Irish Free State, reviewed by Desmond FitzGerald, Minister of Defense.
- 3 April – persistent rainfall causes the banks of the River Lee to burst. Half the houses in Cork are flooded.
- 7 May – the Irish Youth Hostel Service, An Óige, is established.
- 17 May – Muintir na Tíre, the rural organisation, is founded by Canon John Hayes.
- 9 July – Dublin-born racing driver Kaye Don breaks the world water speed record at Lake Garda, Italy.
- 13 August – law books return to the rebuilt Four Courts where High Court business resumes after its destruction during the Civil War.
- 5 September – the first issue of The Irish Press, the newspaper of Fianna Fáil, goes on sale for 1d.
- 27 September – Saor Éire's first National Congress takes place in the Iona Hall in Dublin.
- 4 December – the derelict aerodrome at Collinstown in north County Dublin is considered as the site for a new civil airport.

== Arts and literature ==
- 13 October – Orson Welles makes his first professional stage debut, age 16, at the Gate Theatre, Dublin, with a leading rôle in an adaptation of Jew Süss.
- 25 October – Ireland's first all-concrete Art Deco church, the Church of Christ the King, is opened at Turners Cross, Cork, designed by Chicago architect Barry Byrne with sculptor John Storrs.
- 'Æ' (George William Russell) publishes Vale, and Other Poems.
- Samuel Beckett's Proust is published.
- Cecil Day-Lewis's poetry From Feathers To Iron is published.
- Lord Dunsany's The Travel Tales of Mr. Joseph Jorkens is published.
- Kate O'Brien's first novel, Without My Cloak, is published.
- Frank O'Connor's first short story collection, Guests of the Nation, is published.
- Francis Stuart's first novel, Women and God, is published.

== Sport ==
=== Football ===
- League of Ireland
  Winners: Shelbourne
  FAI Cup
  Winners: Shamrock Rovers 1–1, 1–0 Dundalk

=== Golf ===
- Irish Open is won by Bob Kenyon (England).

== Births ==
- 1 January – Jimmy Smyth, Clare hurler (died 2013).
- 7 February – Cyril Haran, priest and Gaelic football manager (Sligo) (died 2014).
- 2 March – Paddy Cooney, solicitor, Fine Gael TD, Cabinet Minister and MEP.
- 9 March – Jackie Healy-Rae, Fianna Fáil. TD for Kerry South (died 2014).
- 9 April – Patrick Walsh, Bishop of Down and Connor (1991–2008) (died 2023).
- 30 May – John O'Brien, Catholic priest and musician (died 2008).
- 5 June – Laurence Forristal, Bishop of Ossory (1981–2007) (died 2018).
- 8 July – Thomas Flynn, Bishop of Achonry (1976–2007) (died 2015).
- 26 July – Paddy Harte, Fine Gael TD and Minister of State (died 2018).
- 29 July – Tom Mitchell, IRA activist and politician (died 2020).
- 1 August – Seán Ó Riada, composer and musician (died 1971).
- 11 August – Thomas Meaney, Fianna Fáil TD and Minister of State (died 2022).
- 8 September – Desmond Guinness, architectural conservationist (died 2020).
- 20 September – Malachy McCourt, actor, writer and politician (died 2024)
- 13 October – Jimmy O'Neill, soccer player (died 2007).
- 27 October – Seán Calleary, Fianna Fáil TD and Minister of State (died 2018).
- 28 November – Dervla Murphy, travel writer (died 2022).
- 10 December
  - Gustavus Hamilton-Russell, 10th Viscount Boyne, Irish peer, soldier and banker (died 1995).
  - Tom MacIntyre, poet and playwright (died 2019).
- 28 December – Mervyn Taylor, Labour Party TD and cabinet minister (died 2021).
  Full date unknown
  - Mick Cashman, Cork hurler (died 1988).
  - Seán Kinsella, chef and restaurateur (died 2013).

== Deaths ==
- 6 January – Harry Clarke, stained glass artist and book illustrator (born 1889).
- 19 January – Mary Elizabeth Byrne, literary scholar (born 1880).
- 7 March – Hamilton Lyster Reed, recipient of the Victoria Cross for gallantry in 1899 at the Battle of Colenso, South Africa (born 1869).
- 26 March – Timothy Michael Healy, Nationalist politician, journalist, author, barrister and first Governor-General of the Irish Free State (born 1855).
- 22 March – James Campbell, 1st Baron Glenavy, lawyer, Lord Chancellor of Ireland, first Chairman of Seanad Éireann (born 1851).
- 2 April – Katharine Tynan, novelist and poet (born 1861).
- 13 April – William Dowler Morris, mayor of Ottawa (born 1857).
- 22 April – Patrick Kenny, Independent member of the Seanad for 12 years from 1922. Leas Ceann Comhairle 1928.
- 25 June – Con Lucid, Major League Baseball player (born 1874).
- 17 August – Pretty Polly, racehorse (born 1901).
- 27 August – Frank Harris, author, editor, journalist and publisher (born 1856).
- 29 September – William Orpen, painter (born 1878).
- 18 October – Reginald Clare Hart, soldier, recipient of the Victoria Cross for gallantry in 1879 in the Bazar Valley, Afghanistan (born 1848).
- 23 October – Peter de Loughry, member of 1922 Seanad, TD representing Carlow–Kilkenny from 1927 to 1931.
- 28 October – Paddy Glynn, Attorney General of Australia and Minister for External Affairs (born 1855).
- 27 December – Alfred Perceval Graves, writer (born 1846).
