= Patrick Daley (disambiguation) =

Patrick Daley (1844–1914) was a 19th-century Australian bushranger. Patrick Daley may also refer to:

- Patrick R. Daley (born 1975), American businessman and son of former Chicago mayor Richard Daley
- Pat Daley (born 1959), ice hockey player

== See also ==
- Patrick Daly (fl. 1930s–1940s), Irish politician, vintner and farmer
- P. T. Daly (1870–1943), Irish trade unionist and politician
- Pa Daly, Irish Sinn Féin politician
- Pat Daly, Irish footballer
