= 1855 in Ireland =

- Centuries: 17th; 18th; 19th; 20th; 21st
- Decades: 1830s; 1840s; 1850s; 1860s; 1870s
- See also: 1855 in the United Kingdom; Other events of 1855; List of years in Ireland

Events from the year 1855 in Ireland.

== Events ==
- 5 April – opening of Boyne Viaduct at Drogheda by the Dublin and Belfast Junction Railway completes permanent through rail communication between the two principal cities of Ireland.
- 22 August – The Roman Catholic St Mary's Cathedral, Killarney, is consecrated.
- October – Charles Gavan Duffy, founder of the Tenant Right League, emigrates to Australia.
- Charlemont Bridge over the River Blackwater, between Moy and Charlemont is constructed.
- Dublin Zoo buys its first pair of lions.
- Approximate date – the Corraghy Heads and Corleck Head are discovered.

== Arts and literature ==
- The Society for the Preservation and Publication of the Melodies of Ireland publishes The Ancient Music of Ireland edited by George Petrie, including the first publication of the Londonderry Air as collected from a local fiddle player by Miss Jane Ross of Limavady.

== Births ==
- 27 April – Margaret Wolfe Hungerford, novelist (died 1897).
- 17 May – Timothy Michael Healy, Nationalist politician, journalist, author, barrister and first Governor-General of the Irish Free State (died 1931).
- 17 August – Andrew Jameson, public servant, businessman and Seanad member (died 1941).
- 25 August – Paddy Glynn, Attorney General of Australia and Minister for External Affairs (died 1931).
- 11 September – William Mulholland, water service engineer in Southern California (died 1935).
- Full date unknown – James Nowlan, President of the Gaelic Athletic Association (1901–1921) (died 1924).

== Deaths ==
- 14 March – Edward Ffrench Bromhead, mathematician (born 1789)
- 12 August – Richard Bourke, soldier and Governor of New South Wales, Australia from 1831 to 1837 (born 1777).
- 13 November – James Hardiman, lawyer, librarian and historian (born 1782).

== See also ==
- 1855 in Scotland
- 1855 in Wales
