= Maura Murphy =

Irish writer

- Born: Mary McNamee; 6 September 1928; Clonmore, County Offaly
- Died: 5 October 2005 (aged 77)
- Occupation: Writer

Maura Murphy, née McNamee (6 September 1928 – 5 October 2005) was an Irish writer. Her autobiography Don't Wake Me at Doyles became a surprise hit upon its publication in 2004.

== Early life ==
Mary McNamee was born in Clonmore, near Edenderry, County Offaly, one of the seven children of John McNamee and Mary Ann Hannon McNamee. Her father was a labourer. She left school at age 14.

== Career ==
Murphy worked as a domestic and in other part-time jobs; she kept a diary through much of her life, as she raised nine children. She was diagnosed with lung cancer in 1999, at age 70. She began writing her autobiography Don't Wake Me at Doyles shortly thereafter. The book, though somewhat comical in tone, focuses on her life of hardship and poverty, and is critical of the Roman Catholic Church's stances on women, divorce, and contraception. It also includes diary entries by her adult children, as they visit during her illness.

Murphy's autobiography was "a surprise best-seller" upon its publication in 2004. Publishers Weekly praised the book's "skillful storytelling and optimistic spirit" and called it a "hopeful, spunky sister to Angela's Ashes," the Pulitzer Prize-winning autobiography of Frank McCourt.

== Private life ==
Maura McNamee married John Murphy in 1953; they moved to Birmingham in 1959, where he worked in a tire factory. They had nine children born between 1953 and 1963. Though their marriage was often unhappy and they separated several times, she and her husband maintained a life-long connection. John Murphy was present during Maura Murphy's death in 2005, in Birmingham, aged 76 years.
