= Blue Hussars =

Ceremonial cavalry unit of the Irish Army

A Blue Hussar; one of the Irish President's Mounted Escort.

The Blue Hussars, known officially as the Mounted Escort, was a ceremonial cavalry unit of the Irish Army established in 1932. It escorted the President of Ireland on state occasions, most famously to and from presidential inaugurations between 1938, when the first President assumed office, and 1948, when the Escort was disbanded.

Newsreel footage from 1934 shows the Blue Hussars escorting the remains of the U.S. Diplomatic Representative to the Free State.

The name Blue Hussars is sometimes also used to refer to their successors, the motorcycle unit (2 Cavalry Squadron) of the Cavalry Corps that has provided presidential escorts since 1948.

== Origins ==
In 1931, it was decided to provide a mounted escort for state and ceremonial functions. This escort first appeared in public in 1932 to form a guard of honour for the Papal Legate visiting the Irish Free State for the 1932 Eucharistic Congress. They were used subsequently to provide an escort for the President of the Executive Council (prime minister).

== Uniforms ==
A uniform was originally designed by a committee that included Irish artist Seán Keating, consisting of a saffron léine (a form of tunic) with six rows of black braid and black cuffs, a blue brat (a fringed medieval shawl/cloak), tight pantaloons and a black Balmoral cap with saffron feather. For reasons that remain unknown, the original designs for the uniforms were not adopted.

The uniform design finally selected and produced for the unit consisted of tunic and breeches colored a rich sapphire blue (officially alizarine sapphire) with gold frogging and lace of the near-standard international hussar pattern and black sealskin busbies with orange-yellow plumes.

Contemporary rumour suggested (incorrectly) that these distinctive hussar-style uniforms, which gave the unit its nickname, had been found in a cupboard in Dublin Castle in 1932 and dated back to British rule in Ireland. The story was that, rather than discard them, the uniforms were used to dress the army unit escorting the legate. However, while the designs of the uniforms used were based upon British uniforms, files in the National Archives of Ireland show that £2,165 was spent purchasing the seventy uniforms used by the escort. The basic pattern was identical to that of the 8th (King's Royal Irish) Hussars, but the bright blue colour differed from the dark blue of British hussar regiments.

== Soldiers in the escort ==
The Mounted Escort had a total of eighty horses. The escort formation consisted of an advance guard of two, a single connecting file, two flanking riders, and two troops of thirty.

The bulk of the personnel comprising the Mounted Escort were from the Artillery Corps, which during the 1930s was the only part of the Irish Defence Forces employing horses in any numbers. The Escort was not embodied permanently but was brought together for public duties and rehearsals as required. In addition to ceremonial duties, the Escort performed at horse shows and gymkhanas.

== Presidential escort ==
The creation of the Presidency of Ireland in December 1937 resulted in a decision to use the Blue Hussars exclusively for presidential ceremonial. Most notably, they escorted President Seán T. O'Kelly, who travelled to the 1945 inauguration in the late Queen Alexandra's horse-drawn landau, the first (and only) time when a president went to his or her inauguration in a horse-drawn carriage rather than a car.

In 1947, however, after a carriage incident at the Dublin Horse Show at the Royal Dublin Society (RDS), the government of Éamon de Valera decided to abandon the use of carriages for Irish presidents. The next year the First Inter-Party Government decided to disband the Mounted Escort also, even though between 1938 and 1945 the Escort had escorted presidents as they travelled by car. The Minister for Defence argued that motorcycles would be "more impressive" than Irish horses.

Patrick McGilligan, the Minister for Finance who advocated successfully for their abolition, defended his action in Seanad Éireann by saying

I feel no great shame in having helped to get rid of the cavalry escort. Senator Quirke and other Senators may like to know that it was not any antagonism to horses that caused that escort to be dispensed with. I was in Government when the escort was first established. I found to my amazement and horror that some of the uniforms that the first cavalry escort were dressed in were still in existence. It was a question of uniforms having to be remade. It was a question whether it was wise in these days to start to bring out these "Blue Hussars" again, as they were called, or whether we would not become more modern and go in for the motor-cyclist and his peculiar uniform. The change was made. I think it is a good change.

Within the Irish Army, their disbanding was blamed on a lack of suitable horses, a claim critics ridiculed given that Ireland was and is famed for its horses. This has the current result that, while crossbred Irish Draught and Thoroughbred horses are the mounts used by the British Household Cavalry for state and royal occasions, Ireland imports motorcycles to fulfill that role in its own ceremonial.

Though the Blue Hussars were officially disbanded in 1948, 2 Cavalry Squadron was assigned their role and for a time was equipped with blue Honda motorcycles in honour of their predecessors. Due to this association, the unit was occasionally nicknamed the Blue Hussars.

== Footnotes ==
1. Seanad Éireann – Vol 36. Col. 1954. 28 July 1949

== See also ==
- Ceremonial Guard – Canada
- Queen's Guard – United Kingdom
- Royal Palace Guard – Belgium
