= Anne Marjorie Robinson =

British painter (1858–1924)

- Self portrait of Anne Marjorie Robinson
- Born: 1858; Belfast
- Died: 1924 (aged 65–66)
- Known for: Painting

Anne Marjorie Robinson, sometimes Annie Marjorie Robinson, (1858–1924) was a British painter who also exhibited examples of her sculptures and miniatures.

== Life ==
Born in Belfast, Robinson trained as an illuminator and attended the Belfast Government School of Design. In 1907 Robinson moed to London, where she studied portraiture under Alyn Williams of the Royal Society of Miniature Painters. In London she also studied modelling. Robinson returned to Belfast in 1914.

Between 1914 and 1923 she exhibited nine works at the Royal Academy, RA, in London and also exhibited works in the Belfast Museum and in the National Gallery of Ireland. She was appointed an associate of the Society of Women Artists in 1917. She also showed a score of her works at the Walker Art Gallery in Liverpool. Most of her exhibitions were with Royal Hibernian Academy and the Belfast Art Society. She attended several annual exhibitions at both, most notably the 40th Annual Exhibition of the Belfast Art Society. She participated in the 1922 edition of the exhibition of the Belfast Art Society in which she showed four watercolours, a portrait in oils and a case of six miniatures.

A regular subject in Robinson’s works is Saint Brigit of Kildare. She is depicted in paintings titled 'It Was Brigit Wove the First Cloth in Ireland', 'The Baptism of Saint Brigit by Angels', 'Brigit Feeding the Poor'.

== Death ==
Robinson died on 22 October 1924 in Belfast. After her death The Belfast Art Society intended to utilise funds raised from her memorial to purchase one of her works and present it to the Municipal Art Gallery on behalf of the society. They also acknowledged her death in their annual meeting on 30 January 1925. Her pictures were draped in black in the Free Library at the Belfast Art Society. The Ulster Museum has many examples of her work, including an oil on canvas self-portrait. When she died her brother, John B. Robinson, donated 22 miniatures to the museum as a memorial as well as sculptures, watercolours and a self-portrait in oil.

== Legacy ==
In 1925, her works were displayed in an exhibition of oil paintings and water-colour drawings in the Belfast Municipal Art Gallery. The exhibition was opened by Edith Vane-Tempest-Stewart, Marchioness of Londonderry. Lady Londonderry acknowledged the lack of funding and encouragement native Irish artists receive and expressed that citizens should be proud of Robinson’s work.

In October 1927 Mr. Arthur Deane, the appointed curator of the Municipal Art Gallery, arranged an exhibition of Robinson’s collection of miniatures. All twenty-two miniatures that were displayed were owned by the city of Belfast.

A donation of £250 was given to the Samaritan Hospital Belfast when the hospital issued an appeal for the expansion and renovation of the institution. The donation in Robinson's name was given for hospital's immediate expenses and to commemorate Robinson by naming one of the new beds 'A Marjorie Robinson Bed'.
