= Mervyn Jaffey =

Irish cricketer

Personal information
- Full name: Isaac Mervyn Jaffey
- Born: 9 September 1929; Dublin, Leinster, Irish Free State
- Died: 18 December 2014 (aged 85); Bethesda, Maryland, United States
- Batting: Right-handed
- Role: Wicket-keeper

Domestic team information
- Years: Team
- 1953: Ireland

Career statistics
Competition	First-class
Matches	1
Runs scored	–
Batting average	–
100s/50s	–/–
Top score	–
Catches/stumpings	1/1
- Source: Cricinfo, 2 January 2022

Isaac Mervyn Jaffey, known during his cricket career as Mervyn Jaffey and later known as Mervyn Jeffries (born 9 September 1929 in Dublin, Irish Free State) was an Irish former cricketer. A right-handed batsman and wicket-keeper, he played twice for the Ireland cricket team in 1953 including one first-class match.

== Biography ==
Considered an outstanding wicket-keeper at school, Jaffey went to Trinity College Dublin and broke into the cricket team in his first year and was captain of the team in 1952. He made his debut for the Ireland team against the MCC in June 1953 at Lord's. He did not bat in the first innings and scored just one run in the second, his only run for Ireland. His final match was against Scotland in Belfast, which was his only first-class appearance. The match was ruined by rain, with only the Scottish first innings being completed.

After a two match international career that saw him take one catch and three stumpings he found that the demands of his career as a medical doctor prevented him from playing more serious cricket, and he later emigrated to the U.S. to further his career. He later changed his name to Mervyn Jeffries.
