= Rena Dardis =

Publisher and founder of Anvil Press

- Born: Rena Dardis; January 1924; Kilkenny
- Died: 6 January 2017 (aged 92–93); Dublin

Rena Dardis (January 1924 - 6 January 2017), was the publisher and founder of Anvil Press and The Children’s Press.

== Early life ==
Born Katherina (Rena) Dardis in Kilkenny in January 1924 to Christopher Patrick Dardis, a school inspector from Kinnegad, Co Westmeath, and Sara Teresa Conwell, the daughter of a farmer from Killybegs, Co Donegal. She had an older sister, Margaret. Her family moved to Dublin and lived on Palmerstown Road, Rathmines, where Dardis continued to live until she required specialised care in 2009. Her parents had three more children after their arrival in Dublin; triplets Christopher, Rachel and John. Dardis was sporty, playing tennis at Brookfield Tennis Club and golf in Milltown Golf Club.

== Career ==
She started work in Guinness Brewery. However she was not happy with the ability for women to progress there and soon moved on to a career in advertising and became director and copywriter with O’Kennedy Brindley. From 1969 to 1971 she was President of the Institute of Creative Advertising and Design.

=== Publishing ===
In 1962 Dardis was part of the team that founded Anvil Press. Her partners were Seamus McConville and Dan Nolan. Anvil established itself with memoirs and the Irish War of Independence. Dardis continued to run the Press after the death of her partner Dan Nolan.

She was one of those who lobbied for funding for a children's press in the 1980s. When she succeeded she started the Children's Press. For her work on children's books, in 1996 Dardis received the Children’s Books Ireland Award. In 2009 their titles were bought by Mercier Press.

Dardis was an early believer in making her writers the star of the process and encouraged them to interact with their readers.

== Death ==
Dardis died on 6 January 2017 at Leeson Park Nursing Home.
