= 1851 in Ireland =

- Centuries: 17th; 18th; 19th; 20th; 21st
- Decades: 1830s; 1840s; 1850s; 1860s; 1870s
- See also: 1851 in the United Kingdom; Other events of 1851; List of years in Ireland

Events from the year 1851 in Ireland.

== Events ==
- 30 March – the United Kingdom Census shows that, as part of the legacy of the Great Famine, the population of Ireland has fallen to 6,575,000 – a drop of 1,600,000 in ten years. This is the first census to note use of the Irish language.
- 1 August – Midland Great Western Railway extended from Mullingar to Galway.
- 7 August – Poor Relief (Ireland) Act provides for the establishment of dispensaries.
- Construction of MacNeill's Egyptian Arch, a railway bridge near Newry on the Dublin-Belfast railway line is completed.
- Tillie and Henderson open their first shirt factory in Derry.

=== Undated ===
- Ancestors of Presidents of the United States Barack Obama and Joe Biden migrate from Ireland to the U.S.
- Jacob's brand of biscuits, bars and coffee is founded; their first biscuit is possibly Goldgrain.

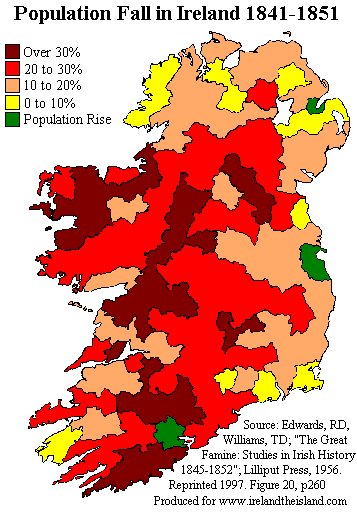
Legacy of the Great Famine

== Births ==
- 8 January – William McDonnell, 6th Earl of Antrim, peer (died 1918).
- 14 March – Paddy Ryan, boxer (died 1900).
- 17 March – Ted Sullivan, Major League Baseball player and manager (died 1929 in the United States).
- 21 March – Henry Prittie, 4th Baron Dunalley, peer and Lord Lieutenant of County Tipperary 1905–1922 (died 1927).
- 4 April – James Campbell, 1st Baron Glenavy, lawyer, Lord Chancellor of Ireland, first Chairman of Seanad Éireann (died 1931).
- 22 May – William Moxley, representative from Illinois's 6th congressional district (died 1938 in the United states).
- 4 September – John Dillon, land reform agitator, Irish Home Rule activist, nationalist politician, MP and last leader of the Irish Parliamentary Party (died 1927).
- 3 December – George Noble Plunkett, nationalist, politician, museum curator (died 1948).

== Deaths ==
- 23 May – Richard Lalor Sheil, politician, writer and orator (born 1791).
- 1 September – Anne Devlin, Irish republican and housekeeper to Robert Emmet (born 1780).

== Census ==
- Surviving 1851 Census Returns of Ireland

== See also ==
- 1851 in Scotland
- 1851 in Wales
