= Irish International Grand Prix =

Motor race in Dublin, 1929–1931

Irish Grand Prix
- Phoenix Park
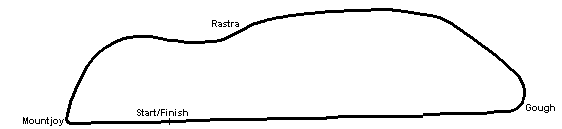

Race information
- Number of times held: 3
- First held: 1929
- Last held: 1931
- Circuit length: 6.9 km (4.25 miles)
- Race length: 482.8 km (300 miles)
- Laps: 70

Last race (1931)

Pole position

Podium
- 1. Henry Birkin; Alfa Romeo 8C 2300 LM; 2. Giuseppe Campari Giulio Ramponi; Maserati 26M; 3. Brian Lewis; Talbot AV105

Fastest lap

The Irish Grand Prix also known Irish International Grand Prix was an open-wheel racing car motor race which was held three times on a 4.25 mile circuit laid out in the grounds of Phoenix Park in Dublin.

== Two races ==
Video from the Eireann Cup on 13 July 1929

The Grand Prix was actually two separate handicap races held under a single banner of the Irish International Grand Prix. Friday's race was for cars up to 1500 cc whose drivers competed for the Saorstát Cup, while on Saturday the drivers in the more powerful cars (over 1500 cc) raced for the Éireann Cup. The overall winner of the Irish Grand Prix was decided by the driver who completed the 300 mile race distance from either the Saorstát Cup or Éireann Cup races in the fastest time over the two days.

The principal award for the Irish International Grand Prix was the Phoenix Trophy, introduced in 1929. Modelled on the Phoenix Monument in Phoenix Park, the trophy was presented to the winner of either the Saorstát Cup or the Éireann Cup, depending on which race was completed in the faster overall time across the two days.

== 1929 ==
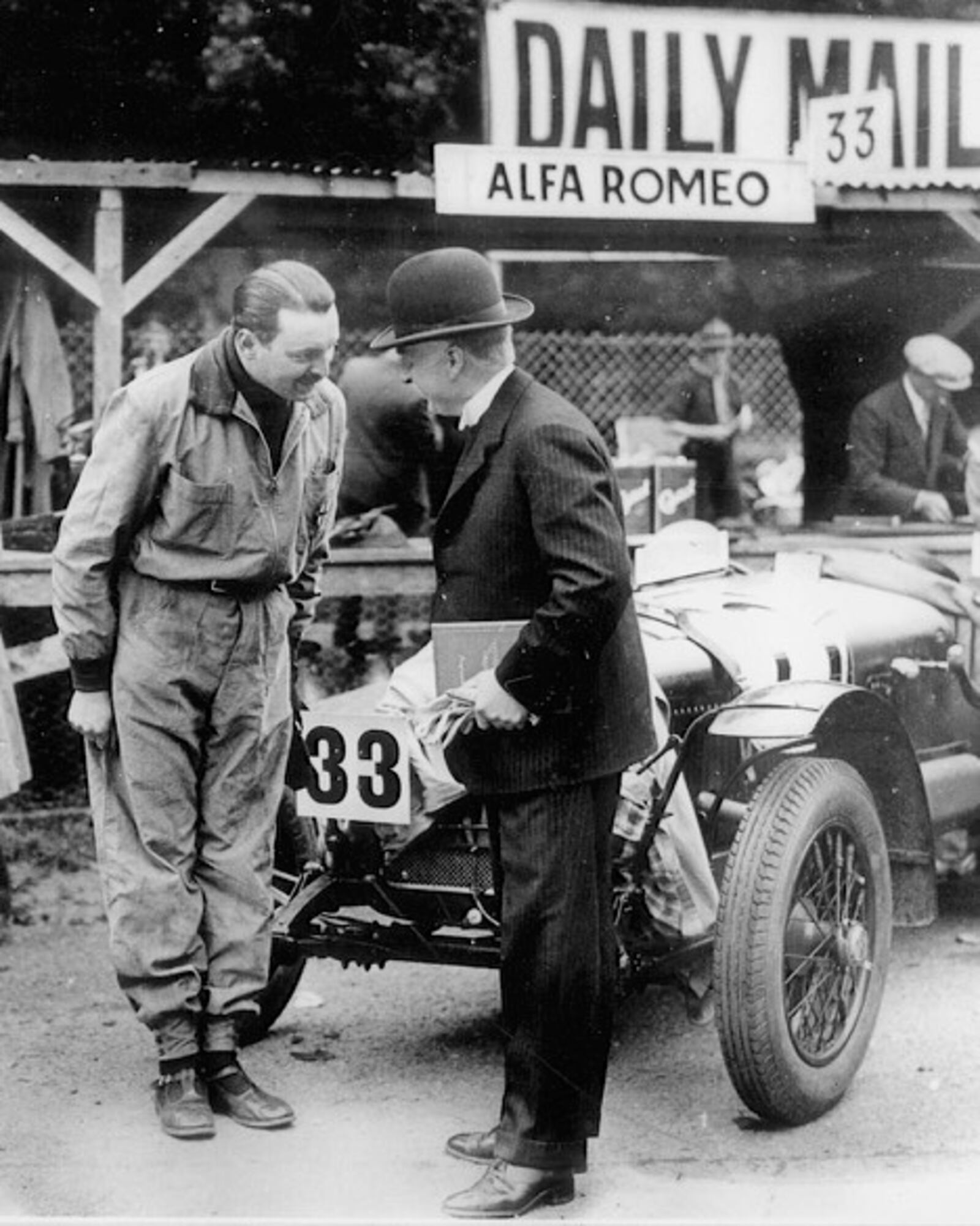
William Thomas Cosgrave congratulates winner Boris Ivanowski at the Saorstát Cup during 1929 Irish GP. The car is an Alfa Romeo 6C 1500 SS.

The first year of the event was 1929 when Boris Ivanowski, a former imperial officer in the Russian army was dominant, racing and winning both the Saorstát Cup and Éireann Cup races driving an Alfa Romeo to claim the inaugural Irish Grand Prix. In the Saorstát Cup race his victory margin was over a minute ahead of Sammy Davis (Lea-Francis), finishing in a time of 3h:41m:30s. In the Éireann Cup race it was a much closer battle between Ivanowski's Alfa Romeo and England's Glen Kidston (Bentley), with the Russian completing the 300 mile race distance in a time of 3h:40m:54s, only 14 seconds ahead of Kidston in second place, followed by Henry Birkin (Bentley) in third.

== 1930 ==
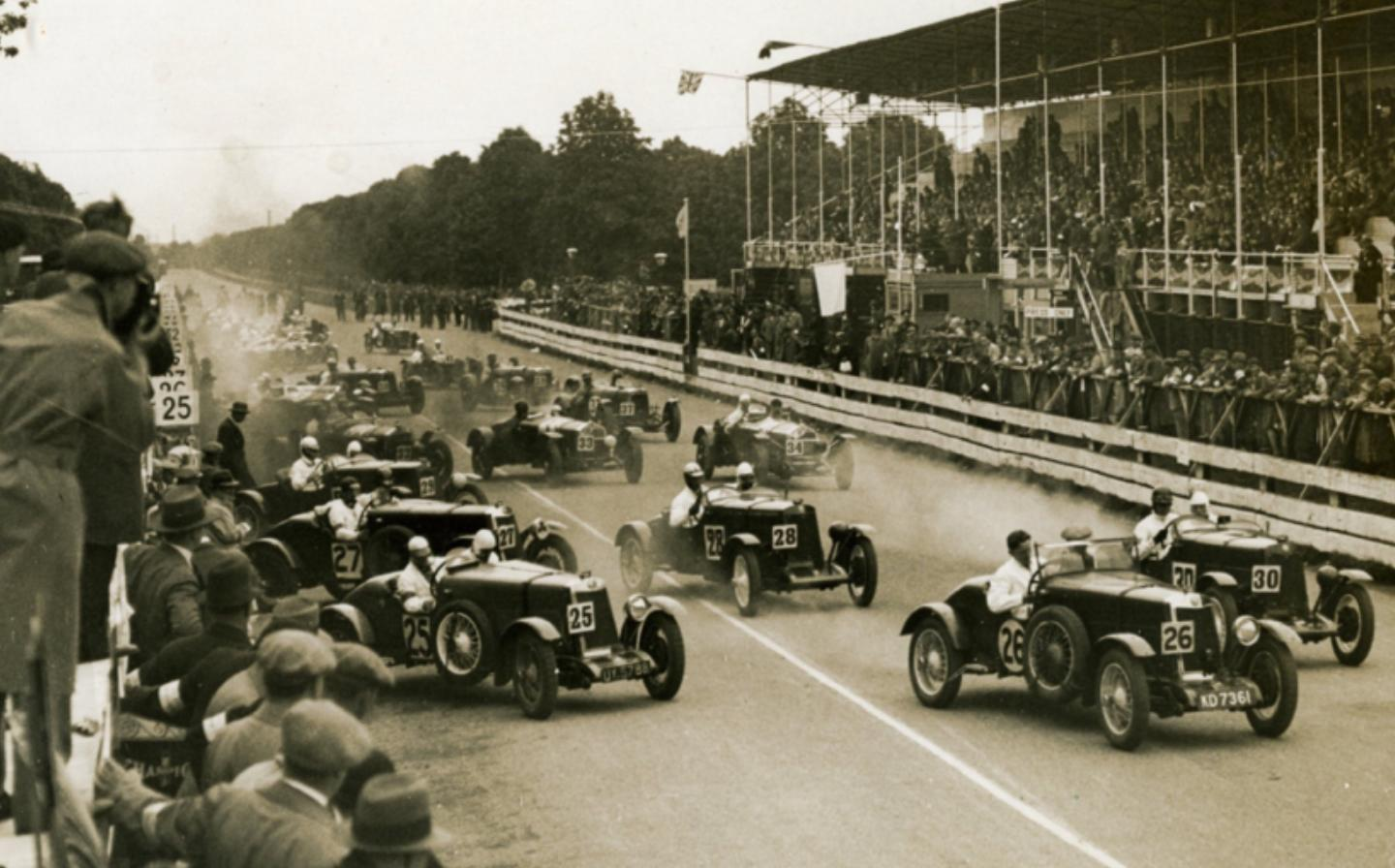
Start of Saorstát Cup at Irish GP in 1930. The five leading are all Lea-Francis Hyper racing cars. The one leading (#26) is Dan Higgin. None of these won the race.

In 1930 Germany's Rudolf Caracciola dominated in the Éireann Cup race to claim the Irish Grand Prix for Mercedes.

== 1931 ==
By 1931 the entry of the two races looked markedly different, with smaller cars racing in the Saorstát Cup and larger cars racing in the Éireann Cup.

== Winners ==
Year	Circuit	Race	Driver	Constructor
1929	Phoenix Park	Saorstát Cup	Boris Ivanowski	Alfa Romeo 6C
1929	Phoenix Park	Éireann Cup	Boris Ivanowski	Alfa Romeo 6C
1929	Phoenix Park	Irish Grand Prix	Boris Ivanowski	Alfa Romeo 6C
1930	Phoenix Park	Saorstát Cup	Victor Gillow	Riley 9 Brooklands
1930	Phoenix Park	Éireann Cup	Rudolf Caracciola	Mercedes SSK
1930	Phoenix Park	Irish Grand Prix	Rudolf Caracciola	Mercedes SSK
1931	Phoenix Park	Saorstát Cup	Norman Black	MG Midget
1931	Phoenix Park	Éireann Cup	Henry Birkin	Alfa Romeo 8C
1931	Phoenix Park	Irish Grand Prix	Norman Black	MG Midget
