= Royal Palace Guard =

The Royal Palace Guard (Dutch: Koninklijke Paleiswachter; French: Garde du Palais Royal) was formerly a unit of the disbanded Belgian Gendarmerie, replaced by the Federal Police. It was a plainclothes detachment tasked with the protection of the King and members of the Royal Family. It also worked alongside the Belgian State Security Service to provides protective security services. The unit, since 2001, had since been known as the Royal Palaces Security Detachment (Détachement de la Royal Palaces de sécurité). In 2015 it was announced that the Federal Police would not longer provide a Palace Guard.
