= Seán T. O'Kelly =

President of Ireland from 1945 to 1959

- Seán T. Ó Ceallaigh
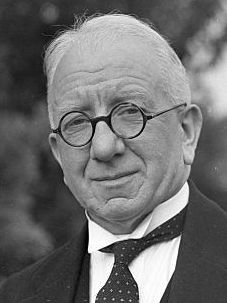
- O'Kelly in 1949

President of Ireland
- In office 25 June 1945 – 24 June 1959
- Taoiseach: Éamon de Valera; John A. Costello; Seán Lemass
- Preceded by: Douglas Hyde
- Succeeded by: Éamon de Valera

Tánaiste
- In office 29 December 1937 – 14 June 1945
- Taoiseach: Éamon de Valera
- Preceded by: Himself as Vice President of the Executive Council
- Succeeded by: Seán Lemass

Minister for Finance
- In office 16 September 1939 – 14 June 1945
- Taoiseach: Éamon de Valera
- Preceded by: Seán MacEntee
- Succeeded by: Frank Aiken

Minister for Local Government and Public Health
- In office 9 March 1932 – 8 September 1939
- Taoiseach: Éamon de Valera
- Preceded by: Richard Mulcahy
- Succeeded by: P. J. Ruttledge

Vice-President of the Executive Council
- In office 9 March 1932 – 29 December 1937
- President: Éamon de Valera
- Preceded by: Ernest Blythe
- Succeeded by: Himself as Tánaiste

Ceann Comhairle of Dáil Éireann
- In office 22 January 1919 – 16 August 1921
- Deputy: John J. O'Kelly; Brian O'Higgins
- Preceded by: Count Plunkett
- Succeeded by: Eoin MacNeill

Teachta Dála
- In office July 1937 – 25 June 1945
- Constituency: Dublin North-West
- In office August 1923 – July 1937
- Constituency: Dublin North
- In office May 1921 – August 1923
- Constituency: Dublin Mid
- In office December 1918 – May 1921
- Constituency: Dublin College Green

Personal details
- Born: John Thomas O'Kelly; 25 June 1882 Dublin, Ireland
- Died: 23 November 1966 (aged 84) Blackrock, Dublin, Ireland
- Resting place: Glasnevin Cemetery, Dublin, Ireland
- Party: Fianna Fáil
- Spouses: Mary Kate Ryan (m. 1918; died 1934); Phyllis Ryan (m. 1936)
- Education: University College Dublin

Military service
- Rank: Staff captain
- Unit: Irish Volunteers
- Battles/wars: Easter Rising

Seán Thomas O'Kelly (Irish: Seán Tomás Ó Ceallaigh; 25 June 1882 – 23 November 1966), originally John T. O'Kelly, was an Irish Fianna Fáil politician who served as the president of Ireland from June 1945 to June 1959. He also served as deputy prime minister of Ireland from 1932 to 1945 (titled as Vice-President of the Executive Council of the Irish Free State from 1932 to 1937 and as Tánaiste from 1937 to 1945), Minister for Local Government and Public Health from 1932 to 1939, Minister for Finance from 1939 to 1945 and Ceann Comhairle of Dáil Éireann from 1919 to 1921. He was a Teachta Dála (TD) from 1918 to 1945.

== Early life ==
O'Kelly was born on 25 June 1882 at 55 Wellington Street in inner-city Dublin. (Note: His place of birth is confirmed on his baptismal and birth registrations. However, the Dictionary of Irish Biography suggests that he was born at 4 Lower Wellington Street, Dublin. Yet another source states that he was born in Capel Street. See: "Glasnevin Trust". Archived from the original on 22 December 2014.) Baptised as John Thomas Kelly, he was the eldest son of Samuel O'Kelly, a boot and shoemaker, by his marriage to Catherine O'Dea. (Note: O'Kelly's parents' marriage registration in 1879 - they had not yet reverted to the Irish form of their names as O'Kelly and O'Dea, but still used 'Kelly' and 'Dea', a custom dating back to when surnames beginning with 'Mac' or 'O' were forbidden entry to Dublin; they were both living in 7 Fishamble Street, a tenement by Christ Church Cathedral that is one of Dublin City's most ancient streets. He is a bootmaker and she is a basketmaker. See: "Marriage Record" (PDF).) He was a twin to a sister, Anna Maria. When John's and Anna Maria's births were registered by their mother on 24 October 1882, she provided their dates of birth as 25 August 1882, likely to avoid paying a fine for late registration.

O'Kelly had three sisters and five brothers, two of whom were educated by Patrick Pearse at St Enda's School.

O'Kelly's first school was the Sisters of Charity in Mountjoy Street (1886–1890), then the Christian Brothers School in St Mary's Place (1890–1894). His senior school education was at O'Connell School, a Christian Brothers school in North Richmond Street (1894–1898). O'Kelly joined the National Library of Ireland in 1898 as a junior assistant to T. W. Lyster, remaining there until 1902, and becoming a subscriber to the Celtic Literary Society. Also in 1898 he joined the Gaelic League, becoming a member of the governing body in 1910 and general secretary in 1915. He was appointed manager of An Claidheamh Soluis, which included amongst its editors the revolutionary leaders of Sinn Féin.

== Active in Sinn Féin ==
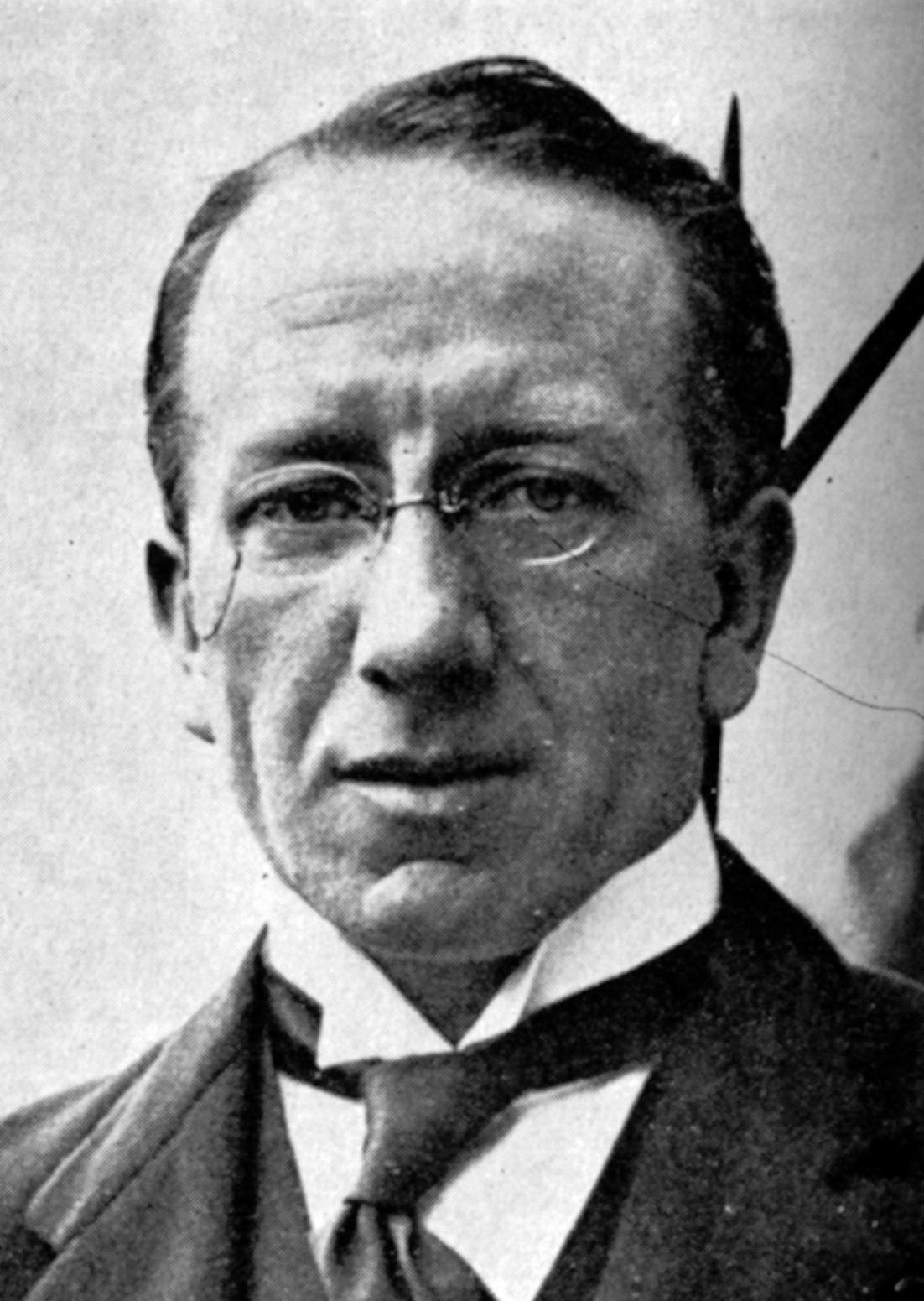
O'Kelly in 1910

He went to work almost immediately for Arthur Griffith, at the Gaelic League on the organization's administration papers. He came to Griffith's notice the previous years joining the Irish Republican Brotherhood as a member of the esoteric Bartholomew Teeling Circle from 1901. O'Kelly joined Sinn Féin, then a small dual-monarchist, capitalist party, immediately at its inception in 1905, as one of its founders. He became a joint-honorary secretary of the movement from 1908, remaining in the post until 1925. In 1906, he was elected to Dublin Corporation, and retained the seat for the Inns Quay Ward until 1924. One acolyte campaigner was Thomas Kelly, who joined him in pressing the government for improved municipal drainage schemes for the Dublin slums.

Like Father Michael O'Flanagan, O'Kelly was chosen to make an Irish language address to Pope Pius X, in 1908. Both men were bilingual party members promoting Irish culture. O'Kelly was one of the establishing members of the Irish Volunteers in 1913. In August 1914, he agitated to suppress the landing of arms at Kilcoole, County Wicklow.

In March 1915, O'Kelly went to New York City, to inform Clan Na Gael of the plans for a rising in Dublin by the IRB.

=== Easter Rising ===
It was during the Easter Rising that O'Kelly met Mary Ryan. She was arrested on 18 May 1916, with her sister Nell for unspecified offences to be incarcerated in Mountjoy Prison. Historians have argued that she may have been confused with her sister, Min Ryan. Kit, as Mary Ryan was known, was Professor of French at University College Dublin. She shared her house with her sisters at 19 Ranelagh Road, Dublin, which O'Kelly visited. They were married in 1918.

O'Kelly was at the heart of the party operation. He was one of a handful of men who might have known of the "All-Ireland" Volunteer HQ at Athenry, County Galway, according to Liam Ó Briain involved in marshalling the rebellion in the western hills from Limerick across the Shannon. He was also responsible for springing Bulmer Hobson from the custody of the IRB. Thereafter Hobson's mysterious "disappearance" became the moment when "a devoted son" of Ireland was excluded from the movement; but O'Kelly may have saved his life. During the Rising he was gazetted staff captain by PH Pearse. He was in and out of the GPO, and was requested to set up as "Civil Administrator of the Government of the Republic" with four others. The project never proceeded, as perhaps no attempt was made to anticipate preparations for a political structure independent from Britain.

After the Easter Rising in 1916, O'Kelly was gaoled, released, and re-arrested. He was sent to Reading Gaol, and then escaped from detention in HM Prison Eastwood Park in Falfield, England, and returned to Ireland. "Sinn Fein became a cloak for Volunteer meetings" Sinn Féin won a landslide victory.

== 1918 general election ==
O'Kelly was elected a Sinn Féin Member of Parliament (MP) for Dublin College Green, in the 1918 general election. In his role as secretary, O'Kelly was tasked with preparing the Sinn Féin Executive Council for the Dáil Éireann Constituent Assembly, which had been agreed at the party Ard Fheis in October 1918. Along with other Sinn Féin MPs, he refused to take his seat in the UK House of Commons in London. Instead, they set up an Irish Parliament, called Dáil Éireann, in Dublin. O'Kelly served as Ceann Comhairle (chairperson) of the First Dáil. O'Kelly published the Democratic Programme, which he himself had edited. It appealed to a wider mission statement for independence and separatism, which was not sanctioned by the electorate. In fact, it was a skeleton document borrowed on the back of Pearse's martyrdom, written in the late leader's style, from the Labour leader Thomas Johnson.

O'Kelly's approach to US President Woodrow Wilson to visit Dublin in 1919 on his way to Versailles, France, was roundly rejected. Wilson was already withdrawing from the Self-Determination League, making his critics label O'Kelly as 'pompous.' Despite the US Senate resolution in June, the president would not break his commitment to the Big Four for unanimity. He also served as the Irish Republic's envoy, demanding recognition of the republic and its admittance to the post-World War I peace treaty negotiations at the Paris Peace Conference. While this request to Clemenceau was sincere, it naively ignored the fact that France and Britain had been allied for the previous four years. O'Kelly was followed to Paris as envoy by the eminently better-qualified George Gavan Duffy, who was from a titled family of barristers and diplomats. In 1920, O'Kelly relocated to Italy, where he met with Pope Benedict XV, briefing the pontiff on the political situation in Ireland. At the same time, O'Kelly met with the future dictator of Italy, Benito Mussolini, who helped the Irishman and other Sinn Féin emissaries to source weapons for use by the IRA.

== Close friend of de Valera ==
O'Kelly was a close associate of Éamon de Valera, who served variously as President of Dáil Éireann (Prime Minister from April 1919 to August 1921) and President of the Republic (from August 1921 to January 1922). As with de Valera, he opposed the Anglo-Irish Treaty, signed by representatives of the British and Irish governments in December 1921.

When de Valera resigned as president of the republic on 6 January 1922, O'Kelly returned from Paris to Dublin, to try to negotiate a compromise, whereby de Valera could return to the presidency. A furious de Valera turned down the offer and ordered O'Kelly to return to Paris.

During the Irish Civil War, O'Kelly was in jail until December 1923. Afterwards, he spent the next two years as a Sinn Féin envoy to the United States. In the US he maintained a team of speakers who worked to raise funds to be used for the anti-treaty side in Ireland and for the thousands of prisoners being held by the newly formed Irish Free State government (see 1923 Irish hunger strikes). Some of the fundraisers were: Maire Comerford, Linda Kearns, Muriel MacSwiney, Hanna Sheehy-Skeffington and Father Michael O'Flanagan.

== A founder of Fianna Fáil ==
In 1926, when de Valera left Sinn Féin to establish Fianna Fáil, O'Kelly returned to Ireland and was appointed a vice-president of the new republican party. In March 1927, he became editor of The Nation and played a significant role in building up support for the new party before the June 1927 general election.

In 1932, when de Valera, having won that year's general election, was appointed President of the Executive Council (Prime Minister of the Irish Free State), O'Kelly was appointed as vice-president of the executive council (deputy prime minister). He was also named minister for local government. O'Kelly earned a controversial reputation over his key role in attempts to publicly humiliate the governor-general of the Irish Free State, James McNeill. Stunts such as withdrawing the Irish Army's band from playing at diplomatic functions which the governor-general attended, or in one notorious case the sight of O'Kelly and Defense Minister Frank Aiken storming out of a diplomatic function at the French Legation when McNeill, the guest of honour, had arrived, damaged O'Kelly's reputation and image, particularly when the campaign backfired.

McNeill published his correspondence on the issue with de Valera, making de Valera appear foolish, before resigning and leaving de Valera with the task of choosing a new governor-general, an embarrassing situation for a politician who had tried his best to avoid any association with the office. To the surprise of many, O'Kelly was not among the names considered for the office. It is not known for certain, but suspicion rests on O'Kelly's membership of a Catholic fraternal organisation, the Knights of Columbanus, which de Valera suspected had a source in the cabinet. O'Kelly matched the bill, perhaps through indiscretions rather than deliberate actions. However, O'Kelly was not made governor-general, the post instead going to the former Fianna Fáil TD, Domhnall Ua Buachalla from County Kildare, who would be the last governor-general of the Irish Free State.

== Considered for President of Ireland in 1938 ==
With the enactment of a new constitution in 1937, O'Kelly remained de Valera's second-in-command, with the new title of Tánaiste.

In 1938, again O'Kelly's position in cabinet became a focus for speculation, as rumours swept Leinster House (the seat of Parliament) that de Valera intended making O'Kelly the Fianna Fáil choice to become President of Ireland, the office which had replaced the governor-generalship in the new Constitution of Ireland. Again, the justification for de Valera nominating one of his senior ministers for the presidency was rumours that someone in the cabinet was, either deliberately or accidentally, letting information slip to the Catholic Church through the Knights of Columbanus. It came as anger and surprise to de Valera to find out that O'Kelly was a member of the Catholic fraternal organisation.

De Valera had on a number of occasions ordered O'Kelly to resign from the Knights, only to find that he would rejoin later. However, the apparent entry of the popular Lord Mayor of Dublin, Alfie Byrne, into the presidential race (in fact he eventually failed to get nominated) and the belief that neither O'Kelly nor any other politician could beat Byrne (ironically a close friend of O'Kelly) led to all party agreement, on the opposition Fine Gael's suggestion, that the office go to Douglas Hyde, a Protestant, as an appreciation for his contribution to Irish society. An Irish language enthusiast, Hyde had founded the Conradh na Gaeilge, known in English as the Gaelic League, a cultural organisation promoting the preservation of the Irish language, music, dancing and traditions.

== Minister for Finance ==
O'Kelly was appointed Minister for Finance in 1941. He secured the passing of The Central Bank Act in 1942. On 17 July 1942, at the fifth and final stage of the Dáil debate on the "Central Banking Bill", he argued that the owner of the credit issued by the Central Bank of Ireland, "will be under the control of the Oireachtas and will be governed by the authority given by the people to the Houses of the Oireachtas". This debate was carried out when only five Deputies were present in the Dáil.

== President of Ireland ==
The inauguration of Seán T. O'Kelly as President of Ireland in 1945. The 2nd Cavalry Squadron of the Blue Hussars escort the President, who travelled in the late Queen Alexandra's landau. The Landau and the Hussars were later scrapped

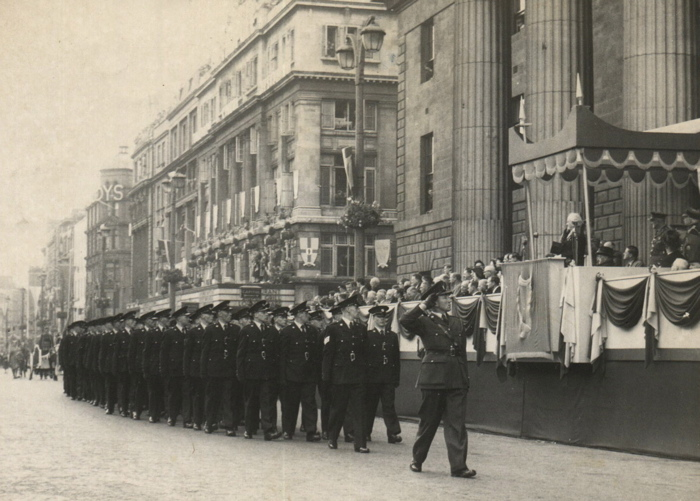
President Seán T. O'Kelly, An Tóstal, 1954. Outside the GPO, President O'Kelly receives the salute from the new Garda recruits during the Tostal celebrations of 1954

O'Kelly was the Fianna Fáil candidate for President of Ireland in 1945. He defeated two other candidates. However, he came up just short of a majority on the first count.

O'Kelly's most famous faux pas occurred during a state visit to the Vatican City, when in a breach with the standard protocol, he told the media of Pope Pius XII's personal opinions on communism. The resulting row strained the relationships between Pope Pius XII and Joseph Stalin.

During his term, he signed the Republic of Ireland Act 1948, which established the Republic of Ireland on 18 April 1949 as an independent republic outside the British Commonwealth. As a result, O'Kelly became the first president of Ireland to be internationally recognised as a full head of state. Prior to 18 April 1949, King George VI was Ireland's head of state as the last king of Ireland.

O'Kelly was reelected on 25 June 1952, this time unopposed. During his second term, he visited many nations in Europe and addressed the United States Congress in 1959. (Note: The six Irish leaders who have addressed joint sessions of the U.S. Congress are Seán T. O'Kelly (18 March 1959), Éamon de Valera (28 May 1964), Liam Cosgrave (17 March 1976), Garret FitzGerald (15 March 1984), John Bruton (11 September 1996), and Bertie Ahern (30 April 2008).) He retired at the end of his second term in 1959, to be replaced by his old mentor and former Taoiseach, Éamon de Valera.

O'Kelly did not refer any Bills to the Supreme Court, under Article 26 of the Constitution of Ireland while he was in office. He convened a meeting of the Council of State in 1947, to consider whether Part III of the Health Bill, 1947 – which provided the basis for the Mother and Child Scheme – should be referred, but he decided against doing so.

He dissolved the Dáil on four occasions (in 1948, 1951, 1954 and 1957). On each occasion, the Taoiseach who advised him to do so (de Valera in the first and third cases, and John A. Costello in the other two) had not been formally defeated in a Dáil vote in a manner showing a loss of support by a majority of TDs. Therefore, under Article 13.2.3° of the Constitution, O'Kelly had no discretion to refuse to act on their advice to dissolve. A more complex case occurred however in 1949, when the First Inter-Party Government was defeated in a snap Dáil vote on a financial measure due to the absence of a number of Government TDs. O'Kelly was advised by the Secretary to the President, Michael McDunphy, that had Costello requested a dissolution, he could have refused it–thus forcing Costello to resign. However, Costello considered that the vote failed by accident (due to a mistake by the party whips), and opted to reintroduce the measure the following morning, rather than seek a dissolution. With all TDs present this time, the vote carried. McDunphy later changed his mind and in the files on the event concluded that O'Kelly could not have refused a dissolution because the loss had merely been a technical loss, not an actual decision by the Dáil to vote against the government.

=== Visit to the United States ===
O'Kelly was the first president of Ireland to visit the United States of America, when from 16 to 31 March 1959, he was the guest of President Dwight Eisenhower. He was invited to address both houses of Congress. This was important to Ireland, as it showed that the republic and its head of state were recognised by the United States. Historian J. J. Lee has stated that the visit signified an end to a period of distrust between Ireland and the United States, following World War II. Both Ireland and America had been neutral countries when the war began, but the US joined the conflict in 1941. But Ireland continued to remain neutral, which annoyed American politicians during the war, and afterwards. The invitation to President O'Kelly to address Congress meant that Ireland had been forgiven by the larger power.

== O'Kelly and Catholicism ==
O'Kelly was known to be a devout Catholic. He made a point of ensuring that his first state visit, following the declaration of the Republic of Ireland in 1949, was to the Vatican City to meet Pope Pius XII. This visit created controversy when the famously talkative O'Kelly inadvertently revealed the pope's private views on communism.

O'Kelly was a member of the Knights of Saint Columbanus.

== "A model President" ==
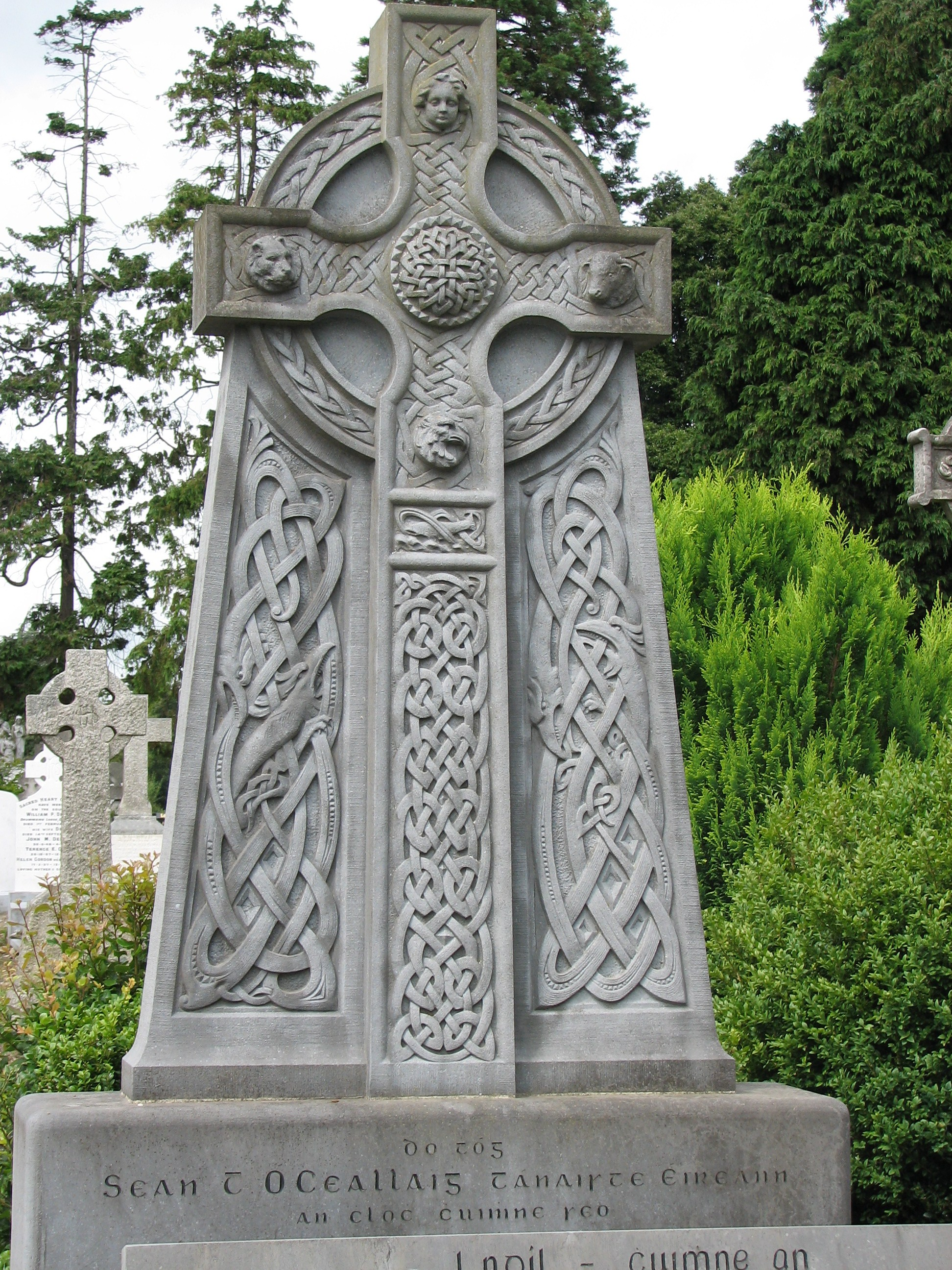
Seán Tomás Ó Ceallaigh; 25 August 1882 – 23 November 1966, was the second President of Ireland (1945–1959)

Éamon de Valera worried about O'Kelly's drinking habits, which were much commented on during his career. O'Kelly drank a lot, and often, yet his behaviour remained dignified and above reproach and he never caused any scandal. The author, Monsignor Pádraig Ó Fiannachta, reported that President O'Kelly kept barrels of draught Guinness stout on tap in Áras an Uachtaráin.

O'Kelly was a short man with a tall second wife. When attending a football match once in Croke Park, he was on the field to throw in the ball. A member of the crowd shouted, "Cut the grass, we can't see the President!"

On his retirement as President of Ireland in 1959, he was described as a "model President" by the normally hostile Irish Times newspaper. Though controversial, the diminutive O'Kelly was widely seen as genuine and honest, albeit tactless.

He died on 23 November 1966, at the age of 84, fifty years after the Easter Rising that first brought him to prominence. He is buried in Glasnevin Cemetery, Dublin.

== Marriages ==
In 1918, O'Kelly married Mary Kate, known as Kit, the daughter of John Ryan, a farmer of Tomcoole, near Taghmon, County Wexford. Kit was an assistant professor of modern languages at the National University. They remained married until her death in 1934, aged 55. They had no children. In 1936, O'Kelly married his late wife's younger sister, Phyllis Ryan, after gaining a papal dispensation to do so. A chemist and public analyst, she was forty-three when they married. She lost her first child and was unable to have any more.

One of Mary Kate and Phyllis's brothers was the Fianna Fáil Minister James Ryan, while another sister, Josephine Ryan, was married to the Fine Gael leader General Richard Mulcahy.

== See also ==
- List of people on the postage stamps of Ireland

== Footnotes ==
Parliament of the United Kingdom
Preceded by John Dillon Nugent	Member of Parliament for Dublin College Green; 1918–1922	Constituency abolished
Oireachtas
New constituency	Teachta Dála for Dublin College Green; 1918–1921	Constituency abolished
Political offices
Preceded by Count Plunkett	Ceann Comhairle of Dáil Éireann; 1919–1921	Succeeded by Eoin MacNeill
Preceded by Ernest Blythe	Vice-President of the Executive Council; 1932–1937	Succeeded by Himself as the first Tánaiste
Preceded by Himself as the last Vice-President of the Executive Council of the Irish Free State	Tánaiste; 1937–1945	Succeeded by Seán Lemass
Preceded by Richard Mulcahy	Minister for Local Government and Public Health; 1932–1939	Succeeded by P. J. Ruttledge
Preceded by Seán MacEntee	Minister for Finance; 1939–1945	Succeeded by Frank Aiken
Preceded by Douglas Hyde	President of Ireland; 1945–1959	Succeeded by Éamon de Valera

Dáil	Election	Deputy (Party)	Deputy (Party)	Deputy (Party)	Deputy (Party)	Deputy (Party)	Deputy (Party)	Deputy (Party)	Deputy (Party)
4th	1923	Alfie Byrne (Ind.)	Francis Cahill (CnaG)	Margaret Collins-O'Driscoll (CnaG)	Seán McGarry (CnaG)	William Hewat (BP)	Richard Mulcahy (CnaG)	Seán T. O'Kelly (Rep)	Ernie O'Malley (Rep)
4th	1925 by-election	Alfie Byrne (Ind.)	Patrick Leonard (CnaG)	Margaret Collins-O'Driscoll (CnaG)	Oscar Traynor (Rep)	William Hewat (BP)	Richard Mulcahy (CnaG)	Seán T. O'Kelly (Rep)	Ernie O'Malley (Rep)
5th	1927 (Jun)	Alfie Byrne (Ind.)	John Byrne (CnaG)	Margaret Collins-O'Driscoll (CnaG)	Oscar Traynor (SF)	Denis Cullen (Lab)	Richard Mulcahy (CnaG)	Seán T. O'Kelly (FF)	Kathleen Clarke (FF)
6th	1927 (Sep)	Alfie Byrne (Ind.)	John Byrne (CnaG)	Margaret Collins-O'Driscoll (CnaG)	Patrick Leonard (CnaG)	James Larkin (IWL)	Richard Mulcahy (CnaG)	Seán T. O'Kelly (FF)	Eamonn Cooney (FF)
6th	1928 by-election	Alfie Byrne (Ind.)	John Byrne (CnaG)	Margaret Collins-O'Driscoll (CnaG)	Patrick Leonard (CnaG)	Vincent Rice (CnaG)	Richard Mulcahy (CnaG)	Seán T. O'Kelly (FF)	Eamonn Cooney (FF)
6th	1929 by-election	Thomas F. O'Higgins (CnaG)	John Byrne (CnaG)	Margaret Collins-O'Driscoll (CnaG)	Patrick Leonard (CnaG)	Vincent Rice (CnaG)	Richard Mulcahy (CnaG)	Seán T. O'Kelly (FF)	Eamonn Cooney (FF)
7th	1932	Alfie Byrne (Ind.)	John Byrne (CnaG)	Margaret Collins-O'Driscoll (CnaG)	Oscar Traynor (FF)	Cormac Breathnach (FF)	Richard Mulcahy (CnaG)	Seán T. O'Kelly (FF)	Eamonn Cooney (FF)
8th	1933	Alfie Byrne (Ind.)	Patrick Belton (CnaG)	Vincent Rice (CnaG)	Oscar Traynor (FF)	Cormac Breathnach (FF)	Richard Mulcahy (CnaG)	Seán T. O'Kelly (FF)	Eamonn Cooney (FF)
9th	1937	Constituency abolished. See Dublin North-East and Dublin North-West							

Dáil	Election	Deputy (Party)	Deputy (Party)	Deputy (Party)	Deputy (Party)
22nd	1981	Ray Burke (FF)	John Boland (FG)	Nora Owen (FG)	3 seats 1981–1992
23rd	1982 (Feb)	Ray Burke (FF)	John Boland (FG)	Nora Owen (FG)	3 seats 1981–1992
24th	1982 (Nov)	Ray Burke (FF)	John Boland (FG)	Nora Owen (FG)	3 seats 1981–1992
25th	1987	Ray Burke (FF)	John Boland (FG)	G. V. Wright (FF)	3 seats 1981–1992
26th	1989	Ray Burke (FF)	Nora Owen (FG)	Seán Ryan (Lab)	3 seats 1981–1992
27th	1992	Ray Burke (FF)	Nora Owen (FG)	Seán Ryan (Lab)	Trevor Sargent (GP)
28th	1997	Ray Burke (FF)	Nora Owen (FG)	G. V. Wright (FF)	Trevor Sargent (GP)
28th	1998 by-election	Seán Ryan (Lab)	Nora Owen (FG)	G. V. Wright (FF)	Trevor Sargent (GP)
29th	2002	Seán Ryan (Lab)	Jim Glennon (FF)	G. V. Wright (FF)	Trevor Sargent (GP)
30th	2007	James Reilly (FG)	Michael Kennedy (FF)	Darragh O'Brien (FF)	Trevor Sargent (GP)
31st	2011	James Reilly (FG)	Alan Farrell (FG)	Brendan Ryan (Lab)	Clare Daly (SP)
32nd	2016	Constituency abolished. See Dublin Fingal			

Dáil	Election	Deputy (Party)	Deputy (Party)	Deputy (Party)	Deputy (Party)
2nd	1921	Philip Cosgrave (SF)	Joseph McGrath (SF)	Richard Mulcahy (SF)	Michael Staines (SF)
3rd	1922	Philip Cosgrave (PT-SF)	Joseph McGrath (PT-SF)	Richard Mulcahy (PT-SF)	Michael Staines (PT-SF)
4th	1923	Constituency abolished. See Dublin North			

Dáil	Election	Deputy (Party)	Deputy (Party)	Deputy (Party)	Deputy (Party)	Deputy (Party)
9th	1937	Seán T. O'Kelly (FF)	A. P. Byrne (Ind.)	Cormac Breathnach (FF)	Patrick McGilligan (FG)	Archie Heron (Lab)
10th	1938	Seán T. O'Kelly (FF)	A. P. Byrne (Ind.)	Cormac Breathnach (FF)	Patrick McGilligan (FG)	Eamonn Cooney (FF)
11th	1943	Seán T. O'Kelly (FF)	A. P. Byrne (Ind.)	Cormac Breathnach (FF)	Patrick McGilligan (FG)	Martin O'Sullivan (Lab)
12th	1944	Seán T. O'Kelly (FF)	John S. O'Connor (FF)	Cormac Breathnach (FF)	Patrick McGilligan (FG)	Martin O'Sullivan (Lab)
12th	1945 by-election	Vivion de Valera (FF)	John S. O'Connor (FF)	Cormac Breathnach (FF)	Patrick McGilligan (FG)	Martin O'Sullivan (Lab)
13th	1948	Mick Fitzpatrick (CnaP)	A. P. Byrne (Ind.)	Cormac Breathnach (FF)	3 seats from 1948 to 1969	
14th	1951	Declan Costello (FG)	A. P. Byrne (Ind.)	Cormac Breathnach (FF)	3 seats from 1948 to 1969	
14th	1952 by-election	Declan Costello (FG)	Thomas Byrne (Ind.)	Cormac Breathnach (FF)	3 seats from 1948 to 1969	
15th	1954	Declan Costello (FG)	Thomas Byrne (Ind.)	Richard Gogan (FF)	3 seats from 1948 to 1969	
16th	1957	Declan Costello (FG)	Thomas Byrne (Ind.)	Richard Gogan (FF)	3 seats from 1948 to 1969	
17th	1961	Declan Costello (FG)	Michael Mullen (Lab)	Richard Gogan (FF)	3 seats from 1948 to 1969	
18th	1965	Declan Costello (FG)	Michael Mullen (Lab)	Richard Gogan (FF)	3 seats from 1948 to 1969	
19th	1969	Hugh Byrne (FG)	Jim Tunney (FF)	Richard Gogan (FF)	David Thornley (Lab)	4 seats from 1969 to 1977
20th	1973	Hugh Byrne (FG)	Jim Tunney (FF)	Richard Gogan (FF)	David Thornley (Lab)	4 seats from 1969 to 1977
21st	1977	Constituency abolished. See Dublin Finglas and Dublin Cabra				

Dáil	Election	Deputy (Party)	Deputy (Party)	Deputy (Party)	Deputy (Party)
22nd	1981	Jim Tunney (FF)	Michael Barrett (FF)	Mary Flaherty (FG)	Hugh Byrne (FG)
23rd	1982 (Feb)	Jim Tunney (FF)	Michael Barrett (FF)	Mary Flaherty (FG)	Proinsias De Rossa (WP)
24th	1982 (Nov)	Jim Tunney (FF)	Michael Barrett (FF)	Mary Flaherty (FG)	Proinsias De Rossa (WP)
25th	1987	Jim Tunney (FF)	Michael Barrett (FF)	Mary Flaherty (FG)	Proinsias De Rossa (WP)
26th	1989	Jim Tunney (FF)	Michael Barrett (FF)	Mary Flaherty (FG)	Proinsias De Rossa (WP)
27th	1992	Noel Ahern (FF)	Róisín Shortall (Lab)	Mary Flaherty (FG)	Proinsias De Rossa (DL)
28th	1997	Noel Ahern (FF)	Róisín Shortall (Lab)	Pat Carey (FF)	Proinsias De Rossa (DL)
29th	2002	Noel Ahern (FF)	Róisín Shortall (Lab)	Pat Carey (FF)	3 seats from 2002
30th	2007	Noel Ahern (FF)	Róisín Shortall (Lab)	Pat Carey (FF)	3 seats from 2002
31st	2011	Dessie Ellis (SF)	Róisín Shortall (Lab)	John Lyons (Lab)	3 seats from 2002
32nd	2016	Dessie Ellis (SF)	Róisín Shortall (SD)	Noel Rock (FG)	3 seats from 2002
33rd	2020	Dessie Ellis (SF)	Róisín Shortall (SD)	Paul McAuliffe (FF)	3 seats from 2002
34th	2024	Dessie Ellis (SF)	Rory Hearne (SD)	Paul McAuliffe (FF)	3 seats from 2002

Dáil	Election	Deputy (Party)	Deputy (Party)	Deputy (Party)	Deputy (Party)
2nd	1921	Seán McGarry (SF)	Seán T. O'Kelly (SF)	Philip Shanahan (SF)	Kathleen Clarke (SF)
3rd	1922	Seán McGarry (PT-SF)	Seán T. O'Kelly (AT-SF)	Alfie Byrne (Ind.)	Laurence O'Neill (Ind.)
4th	1923	Constituency abolished. See Dublin North			
