= Boris Ivanowski =

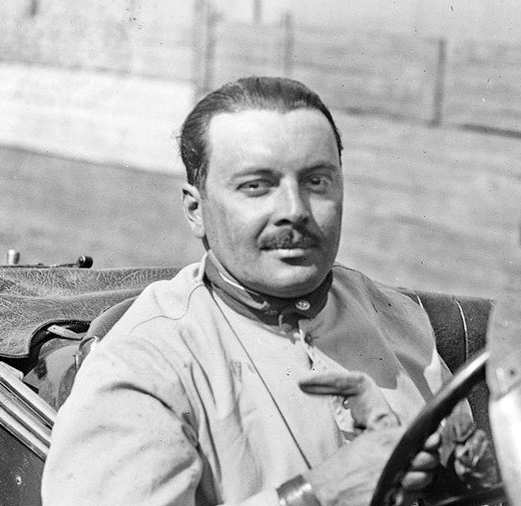
- Ivanowski in 1928
- Nationality: Russian
- Born: Boris Ippolitovich Ivanowski; 12 January 1893 Ashgabat, Russian Empire
- Died: 1967 (aged 73–74)

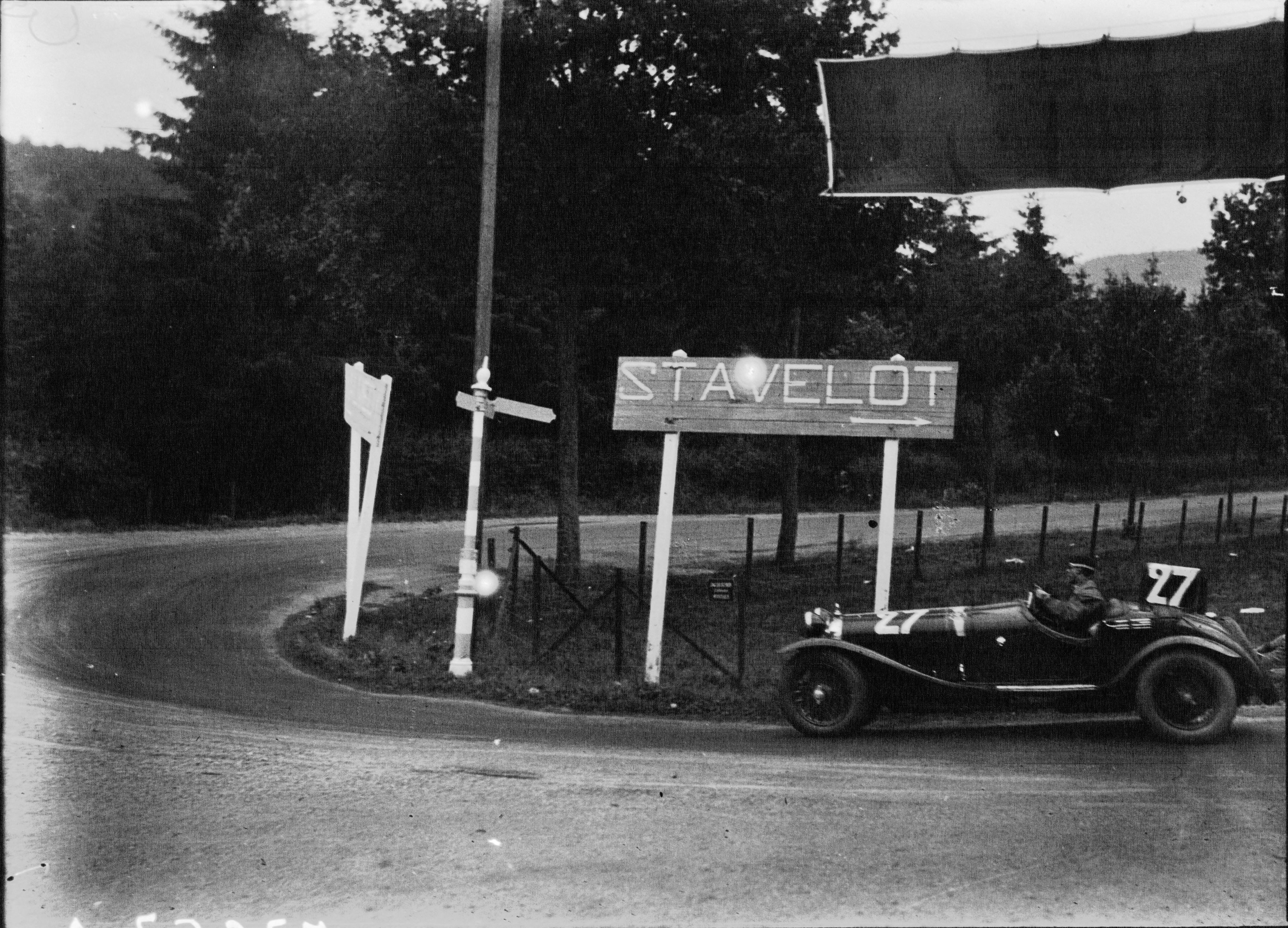
Ivanowski in 1930 for the 24 Hours of Spa, on Alfa Romeo 6C 1750.

Boris Ippolitovich Ivanovsky or Ivanowski (Russian: Борис Ипполитович Ивановский) (12 January 1893 - c. 1967) was an officer of the Russian Imperial Guard who went into exile after the Russian revolution and made his way to fame in the 1920s as a racecar driver.

== Race results ==
=== Irish International Grand Prix winners ===
Season	Date	Race Name	Location	Winning driver	Chassis	Engine
1929	12 July	Irish Grand Prix (Saorstát Cup)	Phoenix Park	Boris Ivanowski	Alfa Romeo 6C	Alfa Romeo
1929	13 July	Irish Grand Prix (Éireann Cup)	Phoenix Park	Boris Ivanowski	Alfa Romeo 6C	Alfa Romeo

=== Complete European Championship results ===
(key) (Races in bold indicate pole position) (Races in italics indicate fastest lap)

Year	Entrant	Chassis	Engine	1	2	3	EDC	Pts
1931	B. Ivanowski	Mercedes-Benz SSK	Mercedes-Benz M06 II 7.1 L6	ITA; 5	FRA; Ret		7th	15
1931	H. Stoffel	Mercedes-Benz SSK	Mercedes-Benz M06 II 7.1 L6			BEL; 5	7th	15

=== Complete 24 Hours of Le Mans results ===
Year	Team	Co-Drivers	Car	Class	Laps	Pos.	Class Pos.
1931	Boris Ivanowski	(France) Henri Stoffel	Mercedes-Benz SSK	8.0	177	**2nd**	**1st**
