= Pat Daly =

Irish footballer

Personal information
- Date of birth: 4 December 1927
- Place of birth: Dublin, Ireland
- Date of death: 1 January 2003 (aged 75)
- Place of death: Ireland
- Position: Defender

Senior career*
Years	Team	Apps	(Gls)
1948–1949	Shamrock Rovers	18	(0)
1949–1951	Aston Villa	3	(0)
1951–1954	Shamrock Rovers	48	(0)
1954–1956	Transport	41	(3)

International career
1949	Republic of Ireland	1	(0)
- * Club domestic league appearances and goals

Pat Daly (4 December 1927 – 1 January 2003) was an Irish footballer who played as a centre half.

== Career ==
He joined Shamrock Rovers in 1948 as a defender. He also had a brief spell in England with Aston Villa in the 1949–50 season playing just three games for the Birmingham-based club.

He won his one and only senior cap for the Republic of Ireland national football team on 8 September 1949 in a 3–0 win over Finland in Dalymount Park, Dublin in a World Cup Qualifying game. Daly's appearance that day was shrouded in controversy, however. The FAI had unwittingly infringed the rules of the World Cup tournament by bringing on a substitute, which at the time, prohibited players being replaced.

Daly represented the League of Ireland XI on 3 occasions while at Glenmalure Park.

== Sources ==
- Paul Doolan; Robert Goggins. The Hoops. ISBN 0-7171-2121-6.
