= Ernest Blythe =

Irish politician (1889–1975)

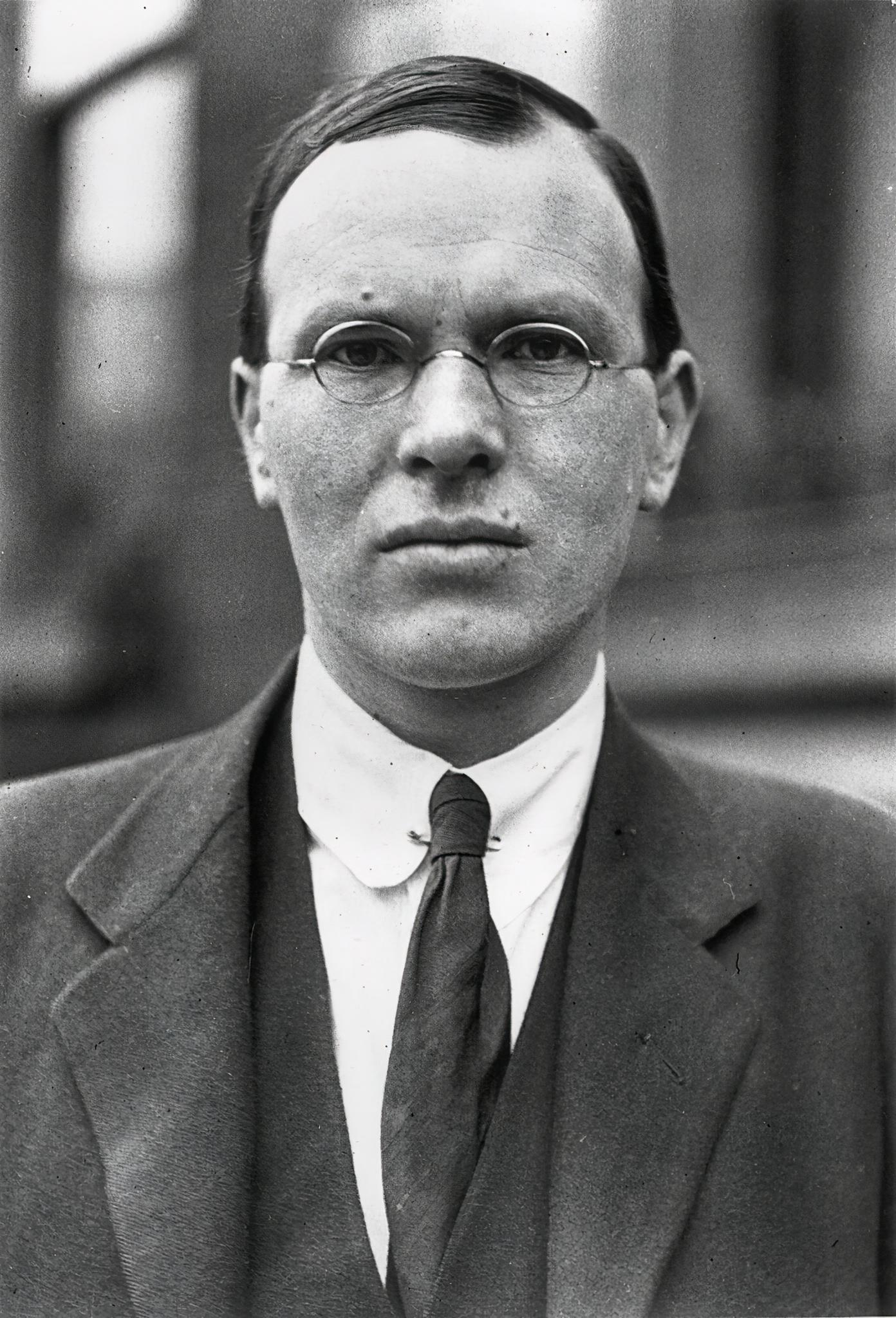
- Blythe in 1922

Minister for Posts and Telegraphs
- In office 12 October 1927 – 9 March 1932
- President: W. T. Cosgrave
- Preceded by: J. J. Walsh
- Succeeded by: Joseph Connolly

Vice-President of the Executive Council
- In office 14 July 1927 – 9 March 1932
- President: W. T. Cosgrave
- Preceded by: Kevin O'Higgins
- Succeeded by: Seán T. O'Kelly

Minister for Finance
- In office 21 September 1923 – 9 March 1932
- President: W. T. Cosgrave
- Preceded by: W. T. Cosgrave
- Succeeded by: Seán MacEntee

Minister for Local Government
- In office 30 August 1922 – 15 October 1923
- President: W. T. Cosgrave
- Preceded by: W. T. Cosgrave
- Succeeded by: Séamus Burke

Senator
- In office 14 March 1934 – 29 May 1936
- Constituency: Labour Panel

Teachta Dála
- In office May 1921 – January 1933
- Constituency: Monaghan
- In office December 1918 – November 1922
- Constituency: Monaghan North

Personal details
- Born: 13 April 1889 Lisburn, County Antrim, Ireland
- Died: 23 February 1975 (aged 85) Phibsborough, Dublin, Ireland
- Party: Sinn Féin; Cumann na nGaedheal; Fine Gael
- Spouse: Anne McHugh (m. 1907; died 1958)
- Children: 3
- Education: Queen's University, Belfast

Ernest William Blythe (Irish: Earnán de Blaghd; 13 April 1889 – 23 February 1975) was an Irish journalist, politician and managing director of the Abbey Theatre. He served as Minister for Local Government from 1922 to 1923, Minister for Finance from 1923 to 1932 and Minister for Posts and Telegraphs and Vice-President of the Executive Council from 1927 to 1932. He was a Senator for the Labour Panel from 1934 to 1936. He served as the Member of Parliament (MP) for Monaghan North from 1918 to 1922 and as a Teachta Dála (TD) for the Monaghan constituency from 1921 to 1933.

== Early life ==
Blythe was born to a Church of Ireland and unionist family in the townland of Magheraliskmisk (Machaire Lios an Uisce), Maghaberry, County Antrim, in 1889. He was the son of James Blythe, a farmer, and Agnes Thompson. He was educated locally, at Maghaberry Cross Roads primary school. At the age of fifteen he started working as a clerk in the Department of Agriculture in Dublin.

Seán O'Casey invited Blythe to join the Irish Republican Brotherhood, which Blythe accepted. He was 18 at the time. He also joined Conradh na Gaeilge, where his first Irish teacher was Sinéad Flanagan, the future wife of Éamon de Valera. He was hesitant to join at first because he was an Ulster Protestant and was afraid he would be kicked out. He "converted to Sinn Féin" after reading the 'Sinn Féin newspaper'.

== Early career ==
In 1909, Blythe became a junior news reporter with the North Down Herald and stayed with the paper till 1913. During this period of his life he had dual membership of the Orange Order and the IRB. On 26 September 1910 Blythe joined the Newtownards Orange Order and remained in the Order until 14 February 1912.

To improve his knowledge of the Irish language, he went to the County Kerry Gaeltacht where he worked as an agricultural labourer to earn his keep.

He was at one point the "centre" or head of the Belfast IRB but was asked to step down by Bulmer Hobson and Denis McCullough so that McCullough could be promoted to a higher office.

During this time, he was the organizer for the Irish Volunteers in County Clare before 1916. His activity spread all over the south-west region to counties Kerry, Cork, Limerick and Clare. He became Captain of the Lispole Company and toured the region with a list of names of people to recruit. Blythe was one of the few organisers sent out into the country (others were Liam Mellows and Ernie O'Malley) and with little qualification was largely self-taught. Supplies were few and far between, as well as spasmodic. IRA GHQ were loth to commit scant resources. But Blythe was expected to drill, and train his men, as well avoid conscription.

Blythe was regularly arrested 1913-15 under the Defence of the Realm Act 1914, when he was finally ordered to be deported from Ireland in July 1915: some of the others on the writ were Liam Mellows, Herbert Pim, and Denis McCullough. Blythe's place was taken by Desmond Fitzgerald. He refused to transport to Britain so was sent to spend three months in Crumlin Road prison, Belfast. On 30 March 1916, a large crowd assembled outside the Mansion House in Dublin to protest against Blythe's and Mellows's deportation. Two policemen were shot at.

Thus, the authorities sent him to a town in Berkshire. He then failed to report to police and was sent to Oxford Prison, Blythe was unable to participate in the Easter Rising due to his imprisonment there. From Oxford, he was sent to Brixton Prison then transferred to Reading Prison. He was released at Christmas 1916, and was ordered never to return to Ireland. However, he returned to Belfast where he was later detained. He was later released and went to Skibbereen to edit the Southern Star which had been purchased by Sinn Féin. He ignored a (British Army) court martial to leave Munster, which resulted in a 12 months imprisonment in Dundalk and Belfast. During his time in Dundalk, he went on hunger strike for several days.

He married Anne McHugh in 1919.

== Political career ==
=== Revolutionary period ===
Blythe first became involved in electoral politics in 1918 when Sinn Féin won the 1918 general election and he became a TD for Monaghan North. He also served as the Minister for Trade and Commerce until 1922.

Blythe was implacably opposed to conscription. In an article entitled 'Ruthless Warfare' he described conscription as an "atrocity".

We must decide that in our resistance we shall acknowledge no limit and no scruple ... [man who] assists directly or by connivance in this crime against us should be killed without mercy or hesitation.... The man who serves on an exemption tribunal, the doctor who examines conscripts, the man who voluntarily surrenders when called for, the man who applies exemption, the man who drives a police car or assists in the transport of army supplies, must be shot or otherwise destroyed with the least possible delay.

The possibility of enforcing conscription alienated people across the island of Ireland from British policy in general. Instead a war of words emerged in which single issues, like conscription, would serve cohere to a general desire for Irish cultural identity and separation.

Awareness of religious differences was acute: for his part, Blythe noticed that there was a Catholic priest in the IRB. Being a moderate, Blythe was a strong supporter of the Anglo-Irish Treaty of 1921.

=== Minister for Finance ===
Consequently, he became Minister for Finance in W. T. Cosgrave's first government in 1923. Until 2014 when Heather Humphreys was appointed as a Minister, he was the "only specifically northern protestant to have served at cabinet level in the 26 County state". He was also Minister for Posts and Telegraphs from 1922 to 1932 and Vice-President of the Executive Council.

Blythe was committed to keeping a balanced budget at all costs, which was not at all easy. The Irish Civil War had placed an enormous strain on the nascent Irish Free State, with public spending almost doubling during its course. As a result, Blythe was confronted with a projected budget of more than £8 million for the following year when the national debt already stood at £6 million. There was widespread criticism when he reduced old-age pensions from 10 shillings (50p) to 9 shillings (45p) a week in the June 1924 Old Age Pensions Act. This has long been popularly credited for the fall of the Cumann na nGaedheal government, although this would not occur for another nine years.

In 1926, as Minister for Finance, he introduced the Coinage Bill so that Ireland had "a coinage distinctively our own, bearing the devices of this country." It was not until 12 December 1928 that the new coins, designed by Percy Metcalfe, were put into circulation. The delay was due to controversy over the animal designs chosen by the government-appointed committee, chaired by W. B. Yeats, set up to advise on the design of the coins.

Blythe funded the Shannon hydroelectric scheme during the late 1920s. Despite his austerity policies in relation to the old and the poor, Blythe readily funded pet projects; in just one year, 1929, his Department of Finance allocated £6,400 – a huge sum at the time – for translation into Irish of novels including Dracula by Bram Stoker. In 1930 he wrote in the Star whether "the gods of democracy have not feet of clay ... the franchise in the hands of an ignorant and foolish populace is a menace to the country".

Cumann na nGaedheal had a very conservative economic policy at the start of the 1930s, seeing their role as running a tight financial ship, facilitating trade, and not intervening in the economy. Between 1929 and 1935, the last three years of his time as Finance Minister and the first three years of a Fianna Fáil government, Free State agricultural exports fell in value by almost 63% from 35 million pounds to 13.5 million pounds annually, and the state's total export value to Britain fell from 43.5 million to 18 million pounds, another drop of over 50%.

=== Into opposition, joining the Blueshirts ===
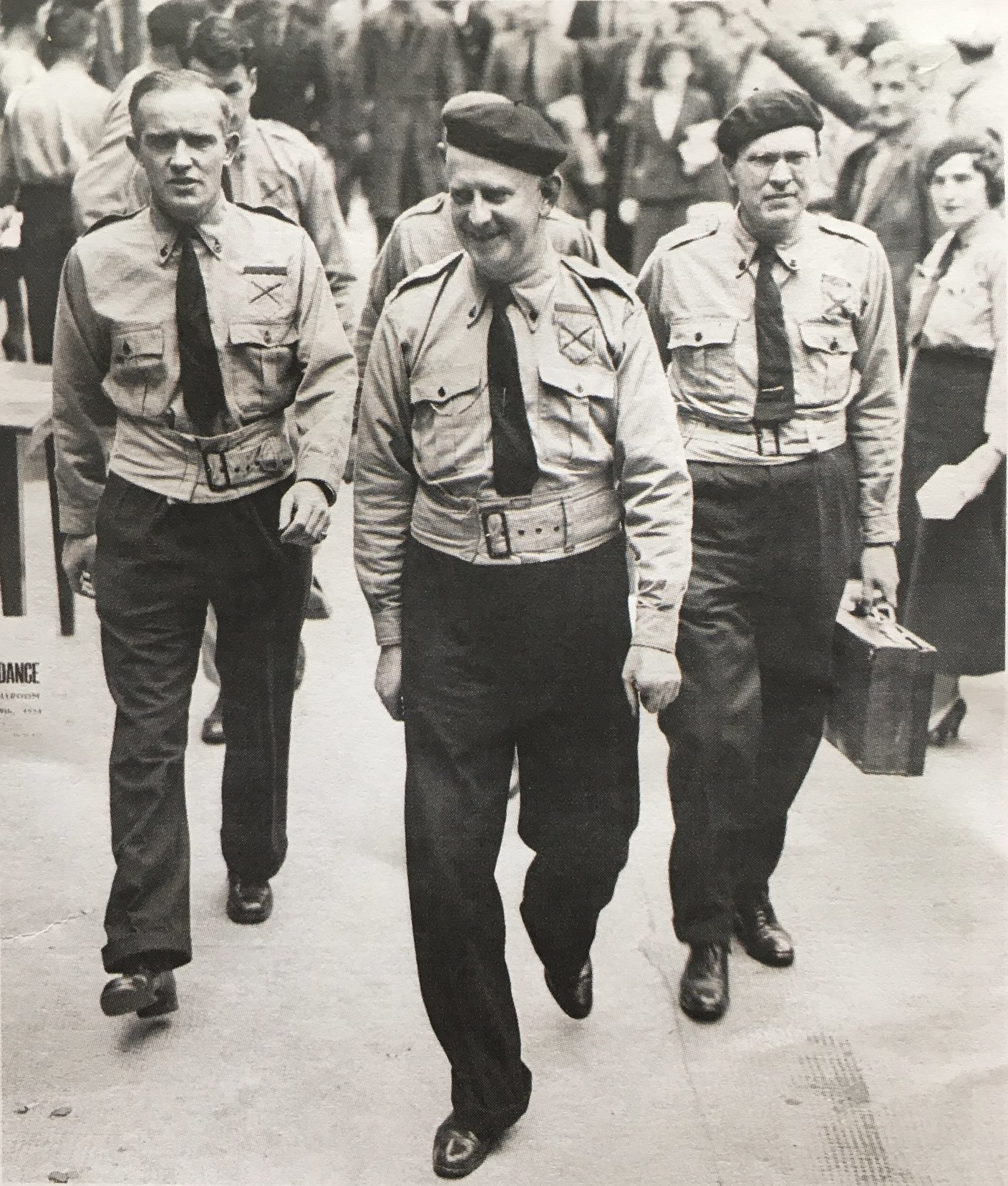
All dressed in Blueshirt attire, Ned Cronin (left) and Eoin O'Duffy (centre) flank Blythe on the right, in this photograph from c. early 1934

At the 1933 general election, Blythe lost his seat. Shortly afterwards he participated in the formation of the Blueshirts. At an Army Comrades Association executive meeting in February 1933, he proposed that the colour blue be the colour of the uniform of the new organization. In April 1933, the ACA began wearing the distinctive blue shirt uniform. Blythe prepared the speeches of Blueshirt leader Eoin O'Duffy and participated in Blueshirt (now officially called the National Guard) meetings all over the country. He also cultivated fascist ideology within the Blueshirts, and envisaged the movement as an all-powerful 'state within the state'. However, following an aborted attempt at a political parade in Dublin, the National Guard was banned. Cumann na nGaedheal and the National Centre Party merged to form a new party, Fine Gael, on 3 September 1933.

In January 1934, Blythe was elected to fill a vacancy in the Senate created by the death of Ellen Cuffe, Countess of Desart. He served in the Senate until the institution was abolished in 1936. He then retired from active political life. In the 1940s, Blythe supported the fascist and anti-Semitic Ailtirí na hAiséirghe. He had been a member of the Craobh na Aiséirghe branch of the Gaelic league which was the predecessor of the party. He advised Ó Cuinneagáin on the drafting of the party's constitution, gave it backing in his journal The Leader, as well as making financial contributions. Blythe supported the idea of a one-party state stating it could fill the gap left in Irish society created by the destruction of the tanistry system.

During The Emergency in Ireland during World War II Blythe was of concern to the G2 whose intelligence files referred to him as a potential "Irish Quisling".

== Abbey Theatre ==
While Minister of Finance, Ernest Blythe granted a small annual subsidy to the Abbey Theatre. This made the Abbey Theatre the first state subsidised theatre in the English-speaking world. In 1935, from an invitation from W. B. Yeats, he became a director of the Abbey Theatre. Between 1941 and 1967 he served as managing director of the Abbey Theatre. He remained a director until 1972.

Blythe was highly criticised during his time as managing director. It was said that he rejected many good plays in favour of those which were more financially rewarding and ran the theatre into the ground as a creative force.

Upon criticism of Blythe only performing comedies, he replied: "There is no reason, snobbery apart. Why, in their plays, dramatists should boycott ordinary dwellings. Most people in Ireland are the habituees of farmhouse kitchens, city tenements or middle-class sitting-rooms and their loves and hates, disappointments and triumphs, griefs and joys, are just as interesting and amusing, or as touching, as those of, shall we say alliteratively, denizens of ducal drawing-rooms, or boozers in denizened brothels".

Blythe brought to prominence several Irish dramatists. These included Brian Friel, Seamus Byrne, Micheal J. Mollow and Hugh Leonard.

It was through Blythe's efforts that the new Abbey Theatre was built. He was responsible for raising £750,000 to rebuild the theatre which had been destroyed by fire on 18 July 1951. In August 1967, Blythe resigned as managing director of the Abbey Theatre. He remained as a member of the theatre board until 1972. He was also an active member of the Television Authority.

== Partition and later life ==
In January 1922, during the Treaty Debates, he said that nationalists had the right to coerce the six counties of Ulster to be a part of a united Ireland. He added, however, "as we pledged ourselves not to coerce them, it is as well that they should not have a threat of coercion above them all the time", while also believing there is "no prospect of bringing about the unification of Ireland within any reasonable period of time by attacking the North East".

Blythe wrote a book Briseadh na Teorann (The smashing of the border) which was published in 1955. It was a revised account of the partition question regarding the divide between the North and South of Ireland. Blythe opposed coercion as a method of achieving a united Ireland: "Partitionist practitioners of violence do more to keep Partition in being than the most extreme section of orangemen". He also challenged the republican belief regarding who was to blame for partition:;"There would be twenty times for truth in describing partition as Ireland's crime against herself than in describing it according to our propagandist formula as England's crime against Ireland". This book did not earn much recognition, selling only 300-350 copies in the first four months, in part possibly because it was in Irish. One author, however, considers Blythe's writings on the partition question both pioneering and influential.

Throughout his life Blythe was committed to the revival of the Irish language. He encouraged Micheál MacLiammóir and Hilton Edwards to found an Irish language theatre in Galway.

He published three volumes of autobiography: Trasna na Bóinne (1957), Slán le hUltaibh (1969) and Gaeil á Múscailt (1973).

Ernest Blythe died on 23 February 1975. His funeral service was held in St. Patrick's Cathedral, Dublin.

== Influence on society ==
Blythe saw his role in politics, as previously stated in this article, as having to keep the economy balanced at all times, this is why his name has 'established a public notoriety far beyond' political circles. During his tenure, 'taxation remained low as did spending'. Blythe's subsidy to The Abbey Theatre influenced the performing arts in Irish society.

Parliament of the United Kingdom
Preceded by James Lardner	Member of Parliament for Monaghan North; 1918–1922	Constituency abolished
Oireachtas
New constituency	Teachta Dála for Monaghan North; 1918–1921	Constituency abolished
Political offices
New office	Minister for Trade and Commerce; 1919–1922	Succeeded by Joseph McGrath
Preceded by Kevin O'Higgins	Minister for Economic Affairs (acting); 1922	Office abolished
Preceded by W. T. Cosgrave	Minister for Local Government; 1922–1923	Succeeded by Séamus Burke
Preceded by W. T. Cosgrave	Minister for Finance; 1923–1932	Succeeded by Seán MacEntee
Preceded by Kevin O'Higgins	Vice-President of the Executive Council; 1927–1932	Succeeded by Seán T. O'Kelly
Preceded by J. J. Walsh	Minister for Posts and Telegraphs; 1927–1932	Succeeded by Joseph Connolly

Dáil	Election	Deputy (Party)	Deputy (Party)	Deputy (Party)
2nd	1921	Seán MacEntee (SF)	Eoin O'Duffy (SF)	Ernest Blythe (SF)
3rd	1922	Patrick MacCarvill (AT-SF)	Eoin O'Duffy (PT-SF)	Ernest Blythe (PT-SF)
4th	1923	Patrick MacCarvill (Rep)	Patrick Duffy (CnaG)	Ernest Blythe (CnaG)
5th	1927 (Jun)	Patrick MacCarvill (FF)	Alexander Haslett (Ind.)	Ernest Blythe (CnaG)
6th	1927 (Sep)	Conn Ward (FF)	Alexander Haslett (Ind.)	Ernest Blythe (CnaG)
7th	1932	Conn Ward (FF)	Eamon Rice (FF)	Ernest Blythe (CnaG)
8th	1933	Conn Ward (FF)	Eamon Rice (FF)	Alexander Haslett (Ind.)
9th	1937	Conn Ward (FF)	Eamon Rice (FF)	James Dillon (FG)
10th	1938	Conn Ward (FF)	Bridget Rice (FF)	James Dillon (FG)
11th	1943	Conn Ward (FF)	Bridget Rice (FF)	James Dillon (Ind.)
12th	1944	Conn Ward (FF)	Bridget Rice (FF)	James Dillon (Ind.)
13th	1948	Patrick Maguire (FF)	Bridget Rice (FF)	James Dillon (Ind.)
14th	1951	Patrick Maguire (FF)	Bridget Rice (FF)	James Dillon (Ind.)
15th	1954	Patrick Mooney (FF)	Edward Kelly (FF)	James Dillon (FG)
16th	1957	Patrick Mooney (FF)	Eighneachán Ó hAnnluain (SF)	James Dillon (FG)
17th	1961	Patrick Mooney (FF)	Erskine H. Childers (FF)	James Dillon (FG)
18th	1965	Patrick Mooney (FF)	Erskine H. Childers (FF)	James Dillon (FG)
19th	1969	Billy Fox (FG)	Erskine H. Childers (FF)	John Conlan (FG)
20th	1973	Jimmy Leonard (FF)	Erskine H. Childers (FF)	John Conlan (FG)
20th	1973 by-election	Jimmy Leonard (FF)	Brendan Toal (FG)	John Conlan (FG)
21st	1977	Constituency abolished. See Cavan–Monaghan		
