= Vice-President of the Executive Council of the Irish Free State =

Deputy head of government of the Irish Free State from 1922 to 1937

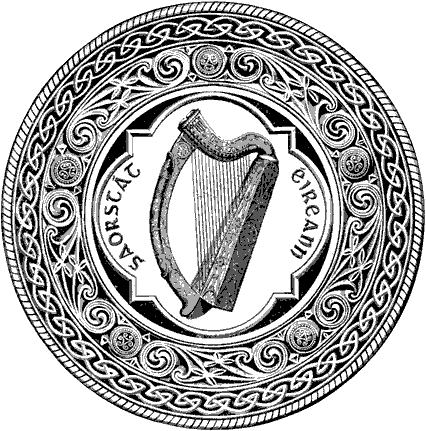
- Great Seal of the Irish Free State
- Residence: No official residence
- Appointer: Governor-General, upon the nomination of President
- Formation: 6 December 1922
- First holder: Kevin O'Higgins
- Final holder: Seán T. O'Kelly
- Abolished: 29 December 1937
- Succession: Tánaiste

The vice-president of the Executive Council (Irish: Leas-Uachtarán na hArd-Chomhairle) was the deputy prime minister of the 1922–1937 Irish Free State, and the second most senior member of the Executive Council (cabinet). Formally the vice-president was appointed by the Governor-General on the nomination of the president of the Executive Council, but by convention the Governor-General could not refuse to appoint a vice-president whom the president had selected.

The office of Vice President of the Executive Council was established with the establishment of the Free State in 1922. Under Article 53 of the Free State constitution the role of the vice president was to "act for all purposes in the place of the President", until the appointment of a successor in the event of his death, resignation or "permanent incapacity", or until his return in the event of his "temporary absence". However, in practice the vice president also held a second ministerial portfolio, whose duties he carried out when not called upon to become acting head of government. The president did not have the authority to advise the Governor-General to dismiss the vice president. Rather, as was the case with all other ministers, the entire Executive Council had to be dismissed and reformed en bloc if a president wanted to dismiss the vice president.

While the Ministry of Dáil Éireann (1919–1922) did not initially have a provision for a deputy president, when President of Dáil Éireann Éamon de Valera travelled to the United States in June 1919, he requested by letter that Arthur Griffith be appointed as Deputy President in his absence. De Valera resumed his position in the Dáil on 25 January 1921. The Provisional Government of the Irish Free State (1922), did not have such a position. In 1937, when the new Constitution of Ireland came into force, the office of Vice-President of the Executive Council was replaced with that of Tánaiste.

== List of officeholders ==
Name	Picture	Term of office		Party	Other ministerial offices held whilst in post
Kevin O'Higgins		6 December 1922	10 July 1927	Cumann na nGaedheal	Minister for Justice (1922–1927)
Ernest Blythe		14 July 1927	9 March 1932	Cumann na nGaedheal	Minister for Posts and Telegraphs (1927–1932)
Seán T. O'Kelly		9 March 1932	29 December 1937	Fianna Fáil	Minister for Local Government and Public Health (1932–1937)
Position replaced by Tánaiste of Ireland in December 1937

== See also ==
- History of the Republic of Ireland
