= 1789 in Ireland =

- Centuries: 16th; 17th; 18th; 19th; 20th
- Decades: 1760s; 1770s; 1780s; 1790s; 1800s
- See also: Other events of 1789; List of years in Ireland

Events from the year 1789 in Ireland.

== Incumbent ==
- Monarch: George III

== Events ==
- 26 March – The Abecedarian Society is established, for the purposes of "raising a fund for the relief of distressed school masters, school mistresses, and their families".
- 29 March – 12 July: John Wesley makes his last visit to Ireland.
- 20 June – following the death of James Hewitt, 1st Viscount Lifford, on 28 April, John FitzGibbon is appointed as Lord Chancellor of Ireland.
- 26 June – a Whig Club is established in Dublin.
- 28 August – the Hodson Baronetcy, of Holybrooke House in the County of Wicklow, is created in the Baronetage of Ireland for Robert Hodson, High Sheriff of Wicklow.
- 24 October – Royal Canal Company incorporated to construct a waterway from Dublin to the River Shannon.
- Mail coaches begin a scheduled service from Dublin to Belfast.

== Arts and literature ==
- Charlotte Brooke's Reliques of Irish Poetry is published in Dublin.
- Thomas Campbell's Strictures on the Ecclesiastical and Literary History of Ireland, From the Most Ancient Times Till the Introduction of the Roman Ritual, and the Establishment of Papal Supremacy, by Henry II, King of England. Also, An Historical Sketch of the Constitution and Government of Ireland, from the Most Early Authenticated Period Down to the Year 1783 is published in Dublin.

== Births ==
- 26 March – Edward Ffrench Bromhead, mathematician (died 1855).
- 24 September – Richard Henry Wilde, lawyer and Congressman in USA (died 1847).
- 3 October – Henry Pottinger, soldier and colonial administrator, first Governor of Hong Kong (died 1856).
- 6 October – Sir Michael O'Loghlen, 1st Baronet, judge, politician and Attorney-General for Ireland (died 1842).
- Mary Fildes, née Pritchard, political activist (died 1876 in England).

== Deaths ==
- 9 October – James Hamilton, 8th Earl of Abercorn, politician (born 1712).
- Full date unknown
  - Frances Greville, poet (b. c1724).
  - Barry St. Leger, British colonel during the American Revolutionary War (b. c1733).
