= William Pollock (cricketer) =

Irish cricketer

Personal information
- Full name: William Pollock
- Born: 28 August 1886; Holywood, Ireland
- Died: 24 November 1972 (aged 86); Belfast, Northern Ireland
- Batting: Right-handed
- Bowling: Right-arm fast
- Relatives: Stuart Pollock (son)

Domestic team information
- Years: Team
- 1909–1923: Ireland

Career statistics
| Competition | First-class |
|---|---|
| Matches | 5 |
| Runs scored | 312 |
| Batting average | 34.66 |
| 100s/50s | 1/1 |
| Top score | 144 |
| Balls bowled | 450 |
| Wickets | 9 |
| Bowling average | 22.22 |
| 5 wickets in innings | – |
| 10 wickets in match | – |
| Best bowling | 3/47 |
| Catches/stumpings | 1/– |
- Source: Cricinfo, 21 October 2018

William Pollock (28 August 1886 – 24 November 1972) was an Irish first-class cricketer.

Pollock was born at Holywood in County Down, and was educated at Campbell College, Belfast. Considered to be the best Irish batsman of his time, Pollock made his debut in first-class cricket for Ireland against Scotland at Perth in 1909. His next first-class appearance came against the same opposition the following year at Dublin, before a two year gap before his next first-class appearance, which came for Stanley Cochrane's Woodbrook Club and Ground against the touring South Africans at Bray. His next appearance in first-class cricket came a decade later against Scotland in 1922, which saw Pollock record his only first-class century when he made 144 opening the batting in Ireland's first-innings. His final first-class appearance came the following year against the same opposition, with Pollock scoring 81 runs in Ireland's first-innings. Considered unfortunate not to play more times for Ireland, Pollock scored a total 312 runs across his five first-class matches at an average of 34.66, while with the ball he took 9 wickets at a bowling average of 22.22, with best figures of 3/47. Following his retirement from playing regular cricket, Pollock coached cricket at Rockport School and later ran a timber business. His son, Stuart Pollock, also played first-class cricket for Ireland and was president of the Irish Cricket Union.
