= Henry Cochrane =

Henry Cochrane may refer to:

- Henry Clay Cochrane (1842–1913), United States Marine Corps general
- Sir Henry Cochrane, 1st Baronet (1836–1904), of the Cochrane baronets
- Sir (Henry) Marc Sursock Cochrane, 4th Baronet (born 1946), of the Cochrane baronets

== See also ==
- Cochrane (surname)
- Matthew Henry Cochrane (1823–1903), Canadian industrialist, livestock breeder, and politician
