= Victorian decorative arts =

Style of art from 1837 to 1901

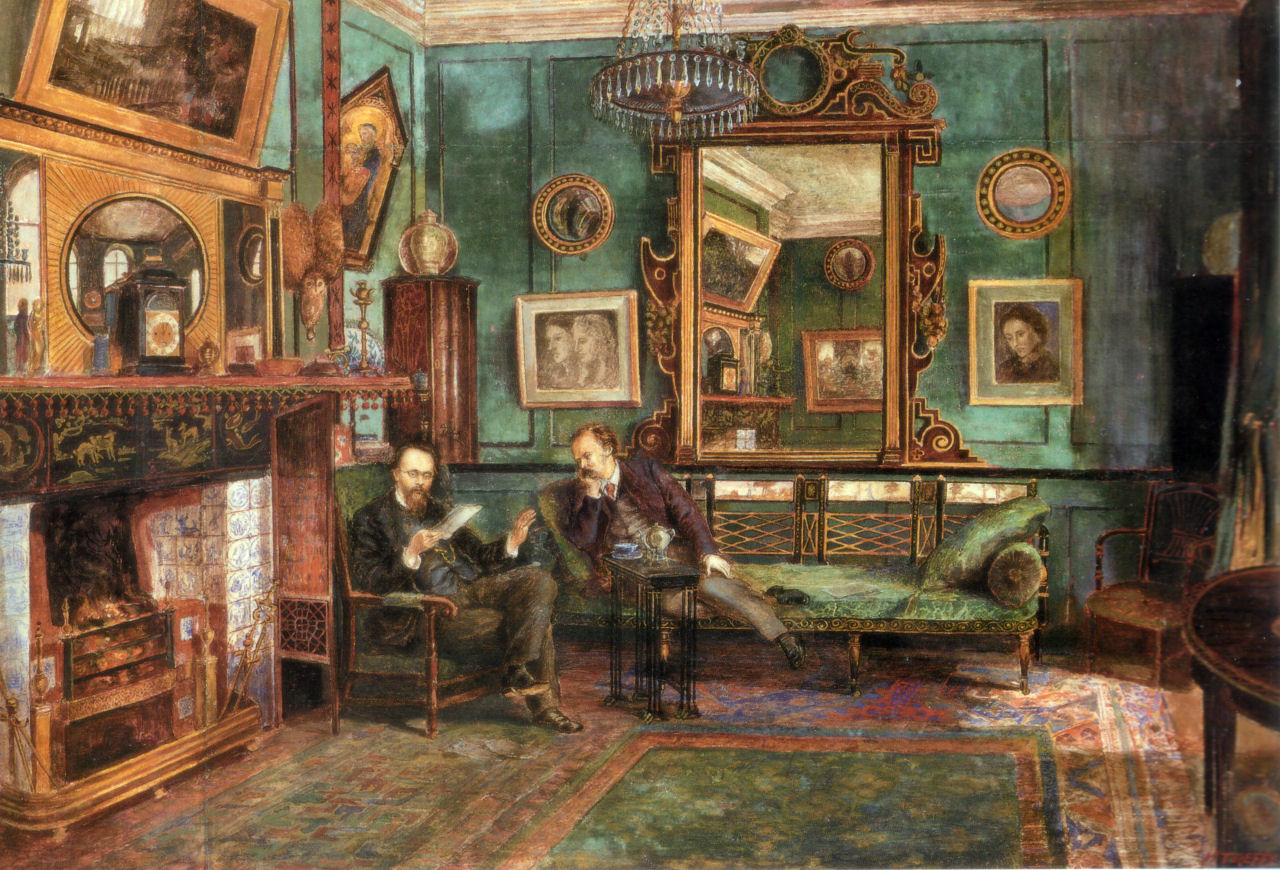
Dante Gabriel Rossetti's drawing room at No. 16 Cheyne Walk, 1882, by Henry Treffry Dunn.

Victorian decorative arts are the style of decorative arts during the Victorian era. Victorian design is widely viewed as having indulged in a grand excess of ornament. The Victorian era is known for its interpretation and eclectic revival of historic styles mixed with the introduction of Asian and Middle Eastern influences in furniture, fittings, and interior decoration. The Arts and Crafts movement, the aesthetic movement, Anglo-Japanese style, and Art Nouveau style have their beginnings in the late Victorian era and Gothic period.

== Architecture ==
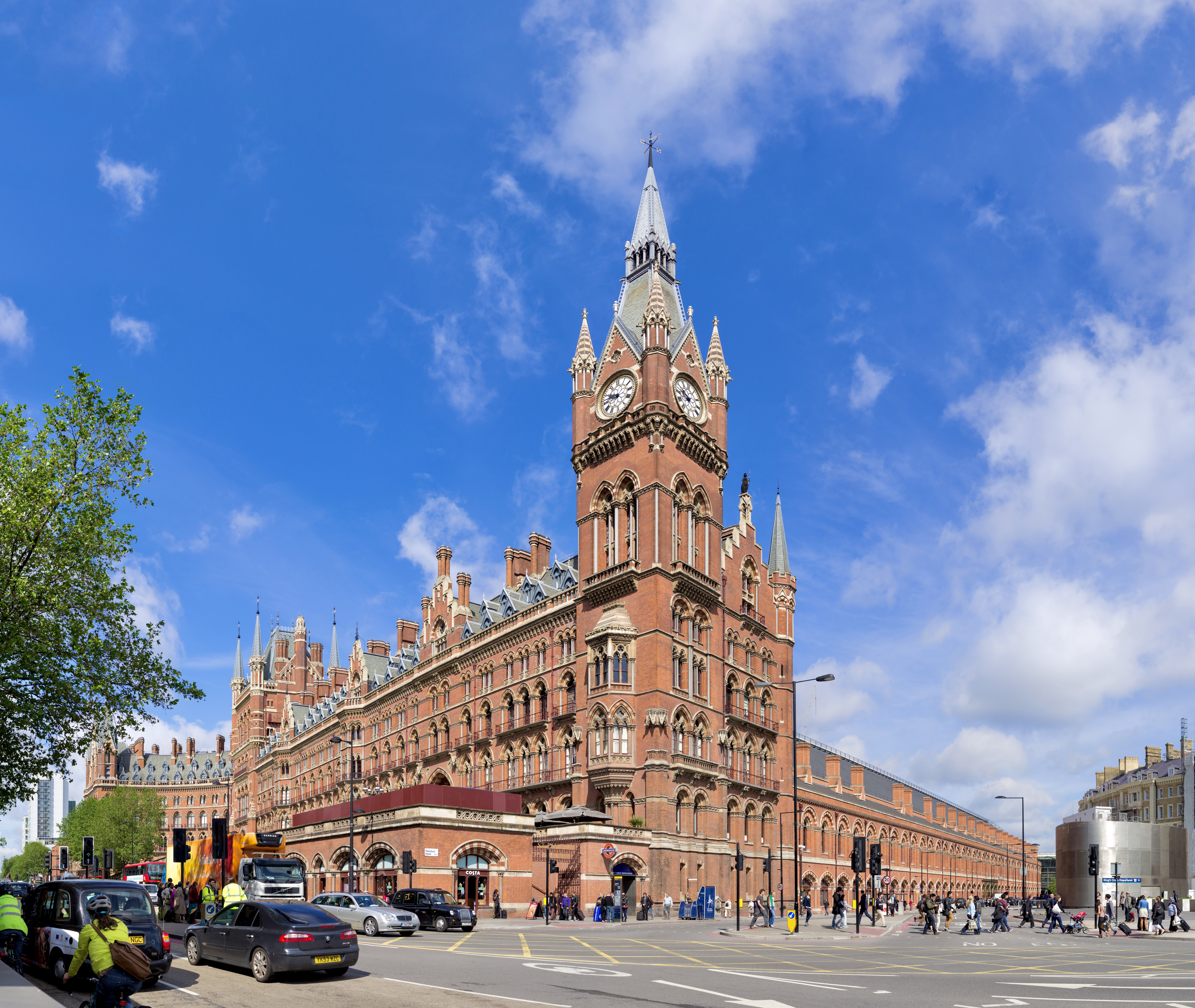
St. Pancras railway station and Midland Hotel in London, opened in 1868

Victorian architecture is a series of architectural revival styles in the mid-to-late 19th century. Victorian refers to the reign of Queen Victoria (1837–1901), called the Victorian era, during which period the styles known as Victorian were used in construction. However, many elements of what is typically termed "Victorian" architecture did not become popular until later in Victoria's reign, roughly from 1850 and later. The styles often included interpretations and eclectic revivals of historic styles (see historicism). The name represents the British and French custom of naming architectural styles for a reigning monarch. Within this naming and classification scheme, it followed Georgian architecture and later Regency architecture and was succeeded by Edwardian architecture.

Although Victoria did not reign over the United States, the term is often used for American styles and buildings from the same period, as well as those from the British Empire.

== Interior decoration and design ==
Interior decoration and interior design of the Victorian era are noted for orderliness and ornamentation. A house from this period was idealistically divided in rooms, with public and private space carefully separated. A bare room was considered to be in poor taste, so every surface was filled with objects that reflected the owner's interests and aspirations.

The parlour was the most important room in a home and was the showcase for the homeowners where guests were entertained. The dining room was the second-most important room in the house. The sideboard was most often the focal point, which attracts visitor’s eyes immediately when they go into a room or space, of the dining room and very ornately decorated.

=== American interiors ===
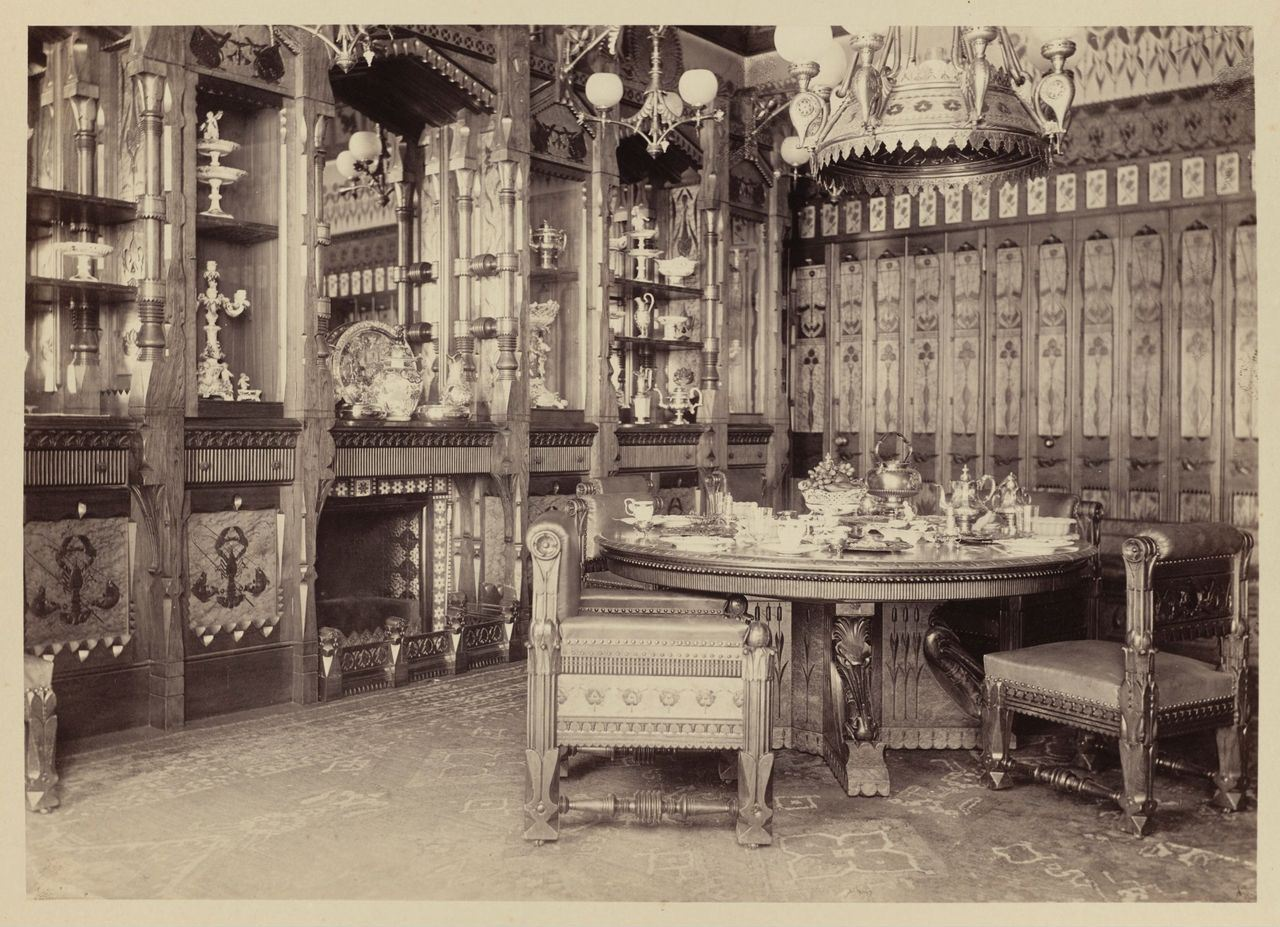
Dining room of the Theodore Roosevelt Sr. townhouse, New York City (1873, demolished).

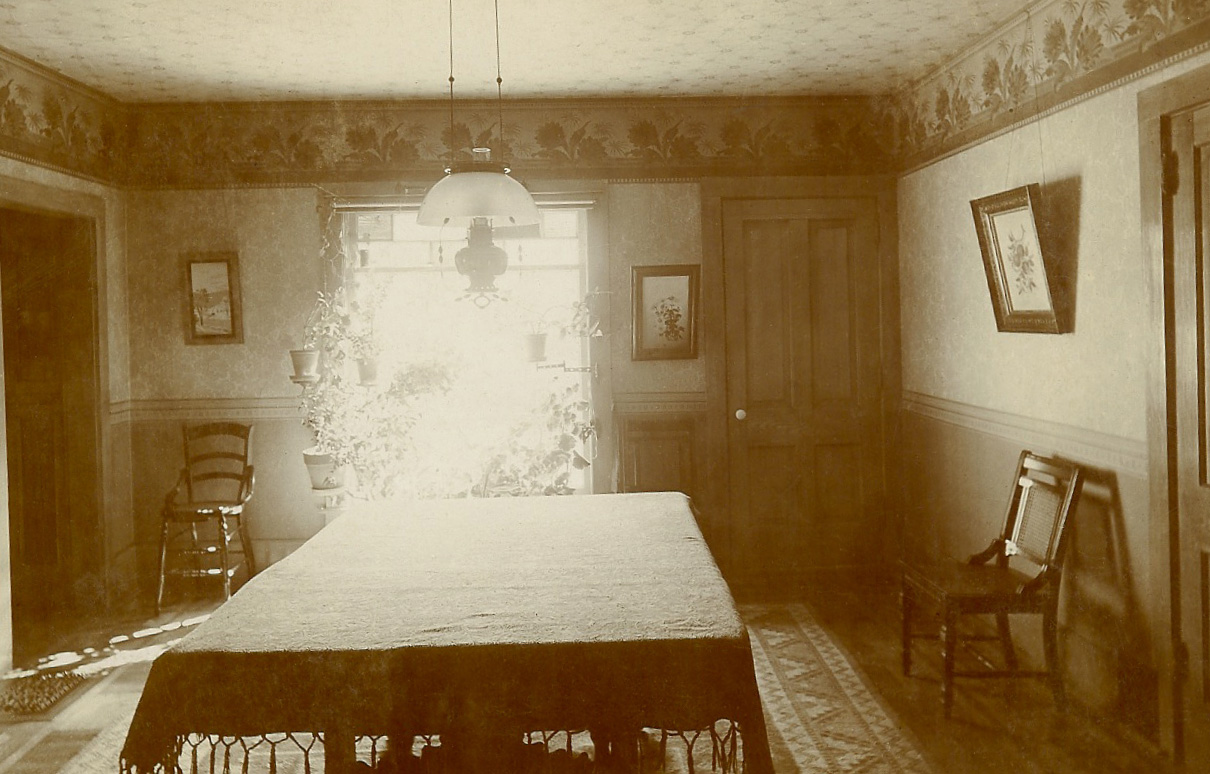
Victorian style dining room, USA,
early 1900s.

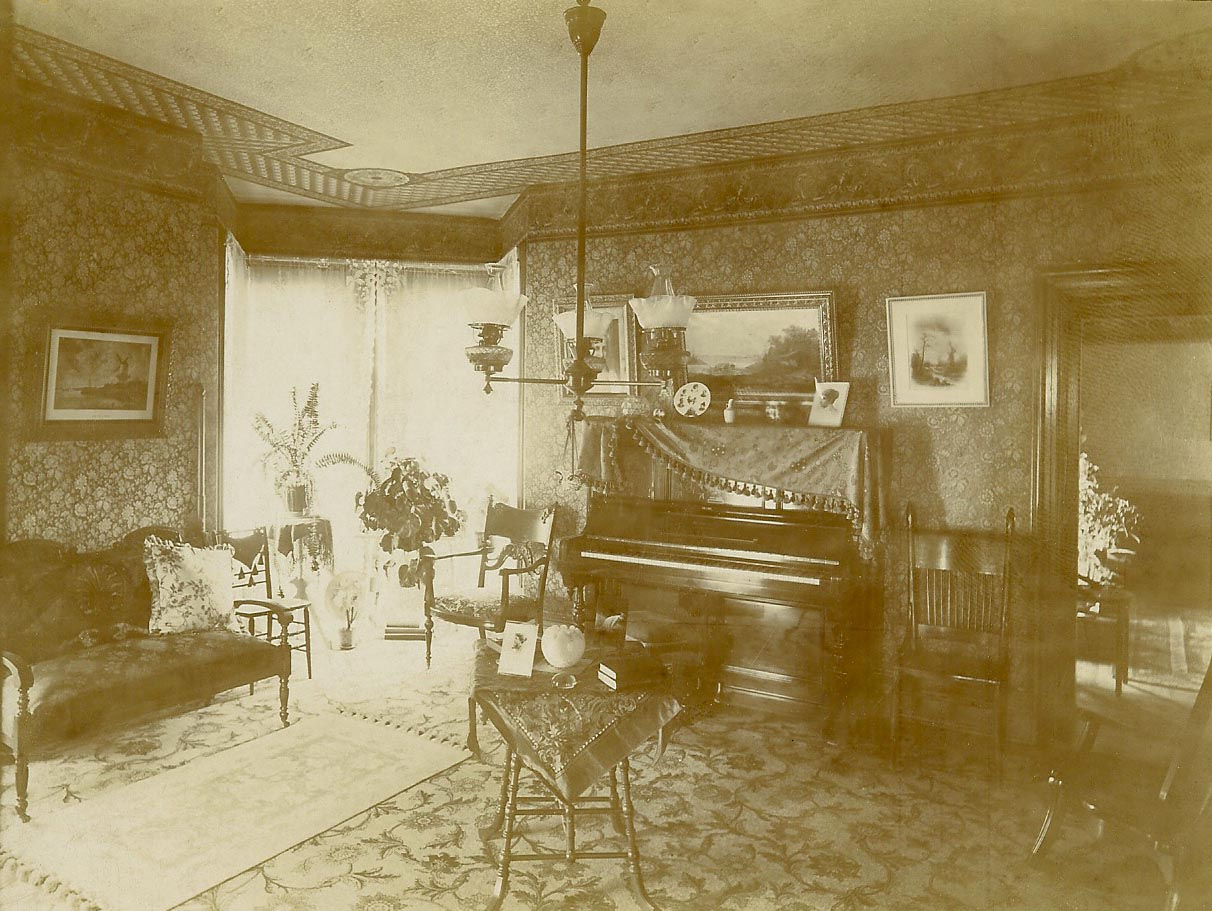
Victorian style parlor, USA, early 1900s

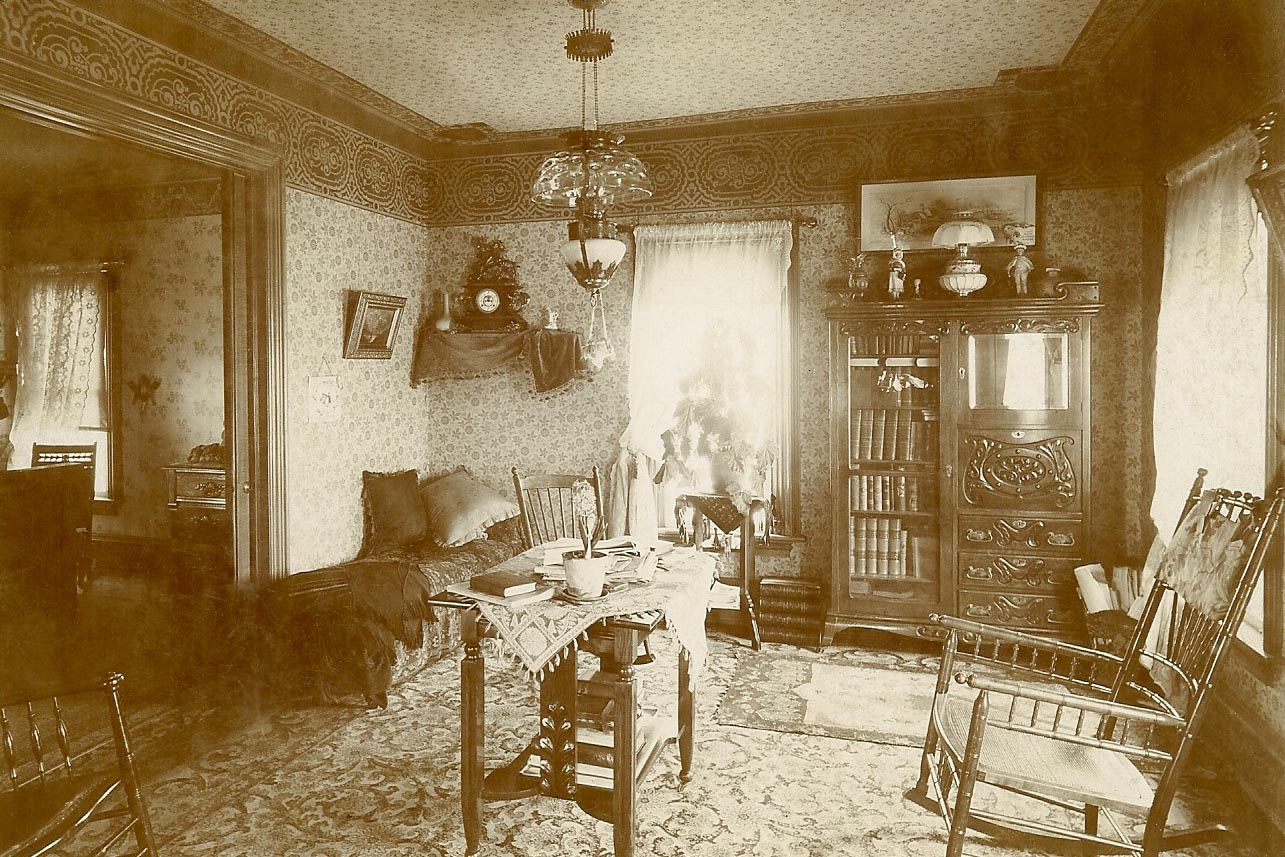
Room with Victorian design, early 1900s

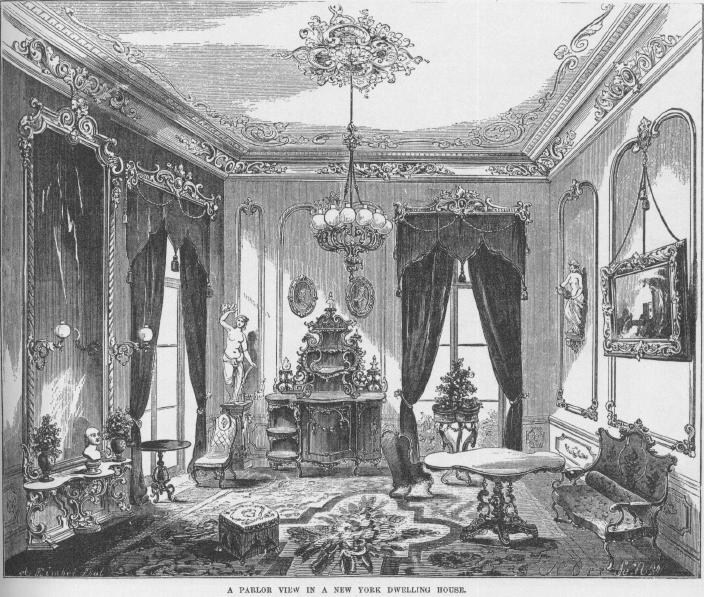
Parlor in a New York House from the 1850s.

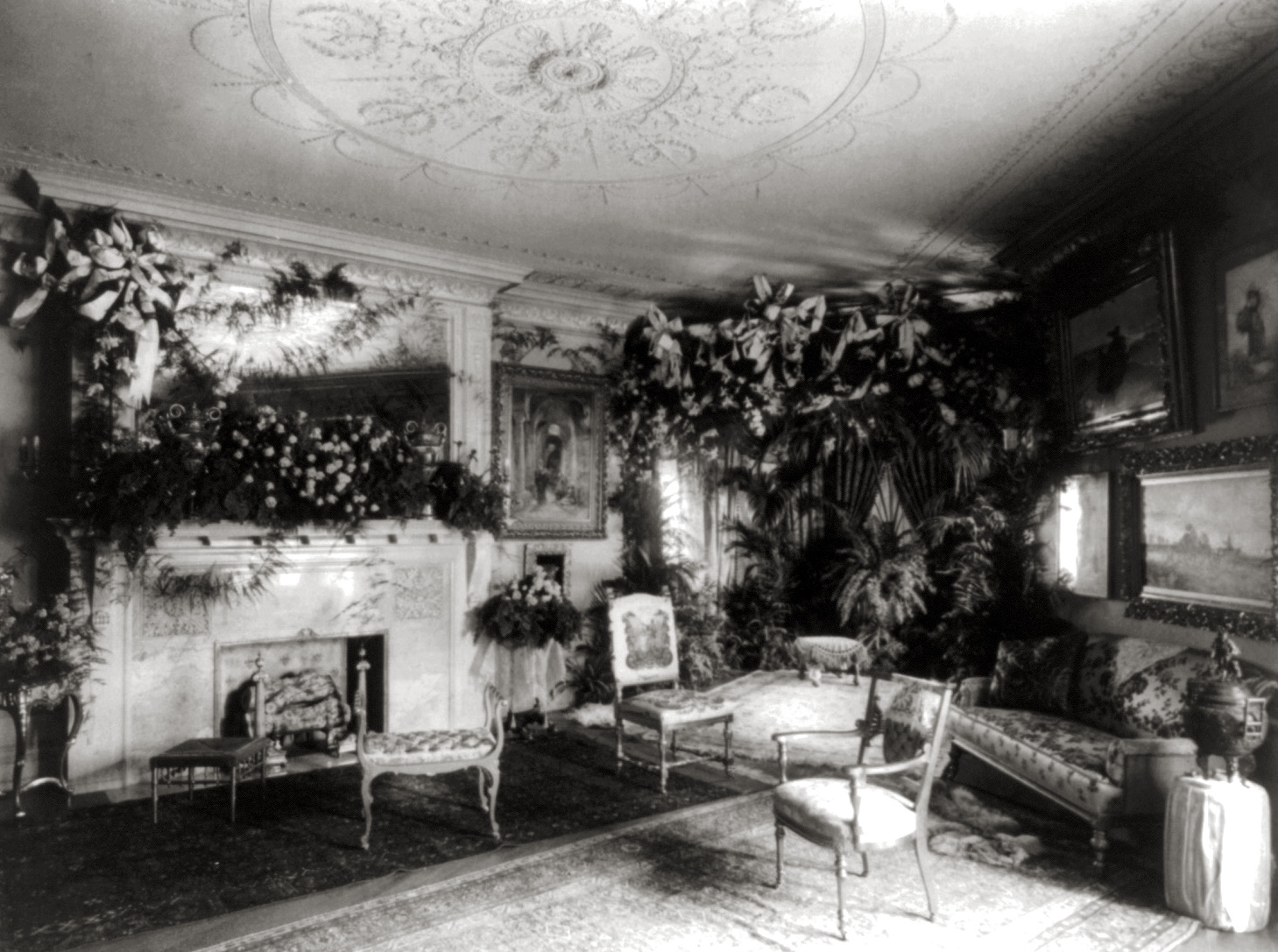
The parlor of the Whittemore House 1526 New Hampshire Avenue, Dupont Circle, Washington, D.C

=== Preserved interiors, private spaces ===
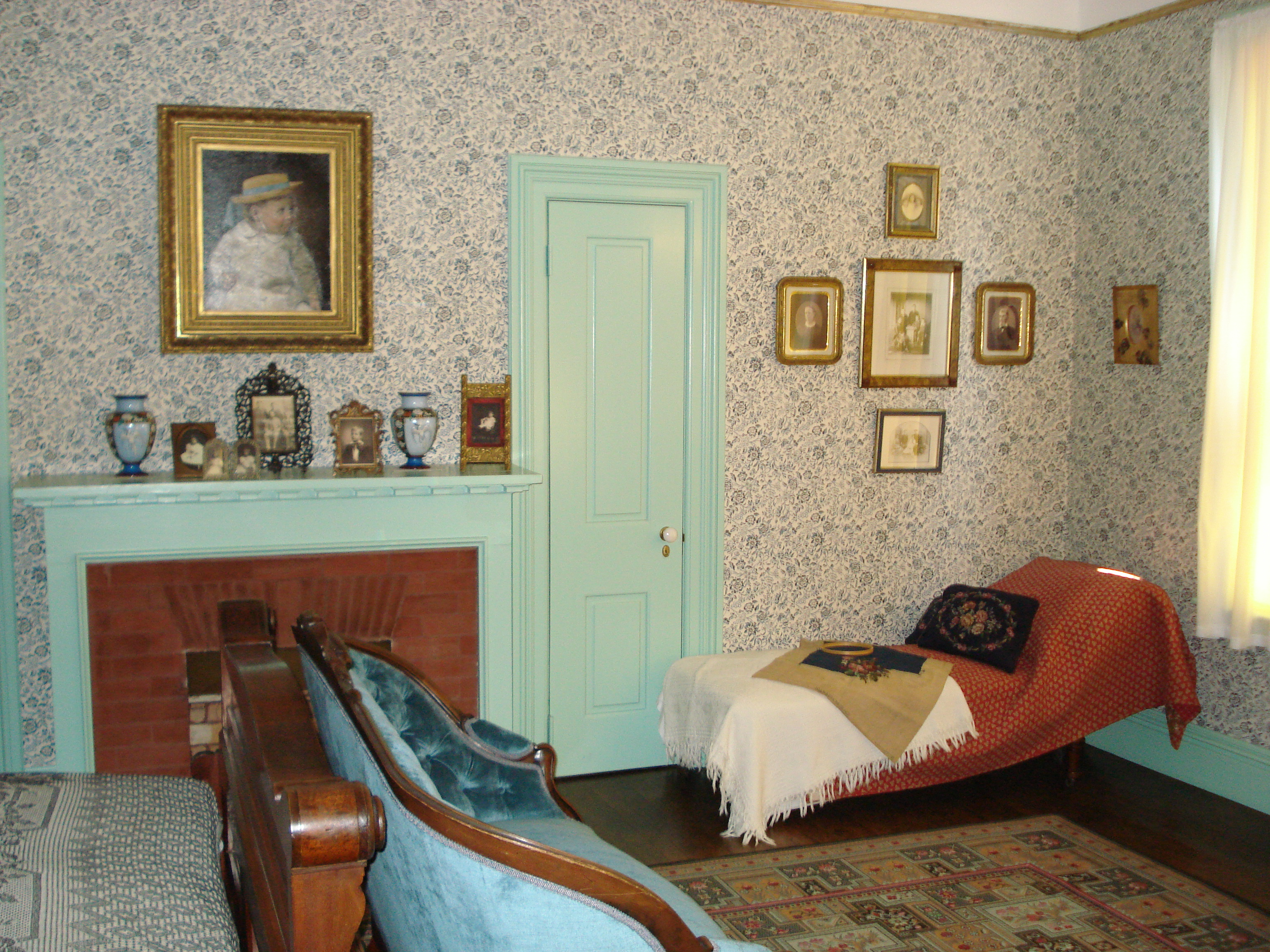
1890s Bedroom, James A. Garfield National Historic Site

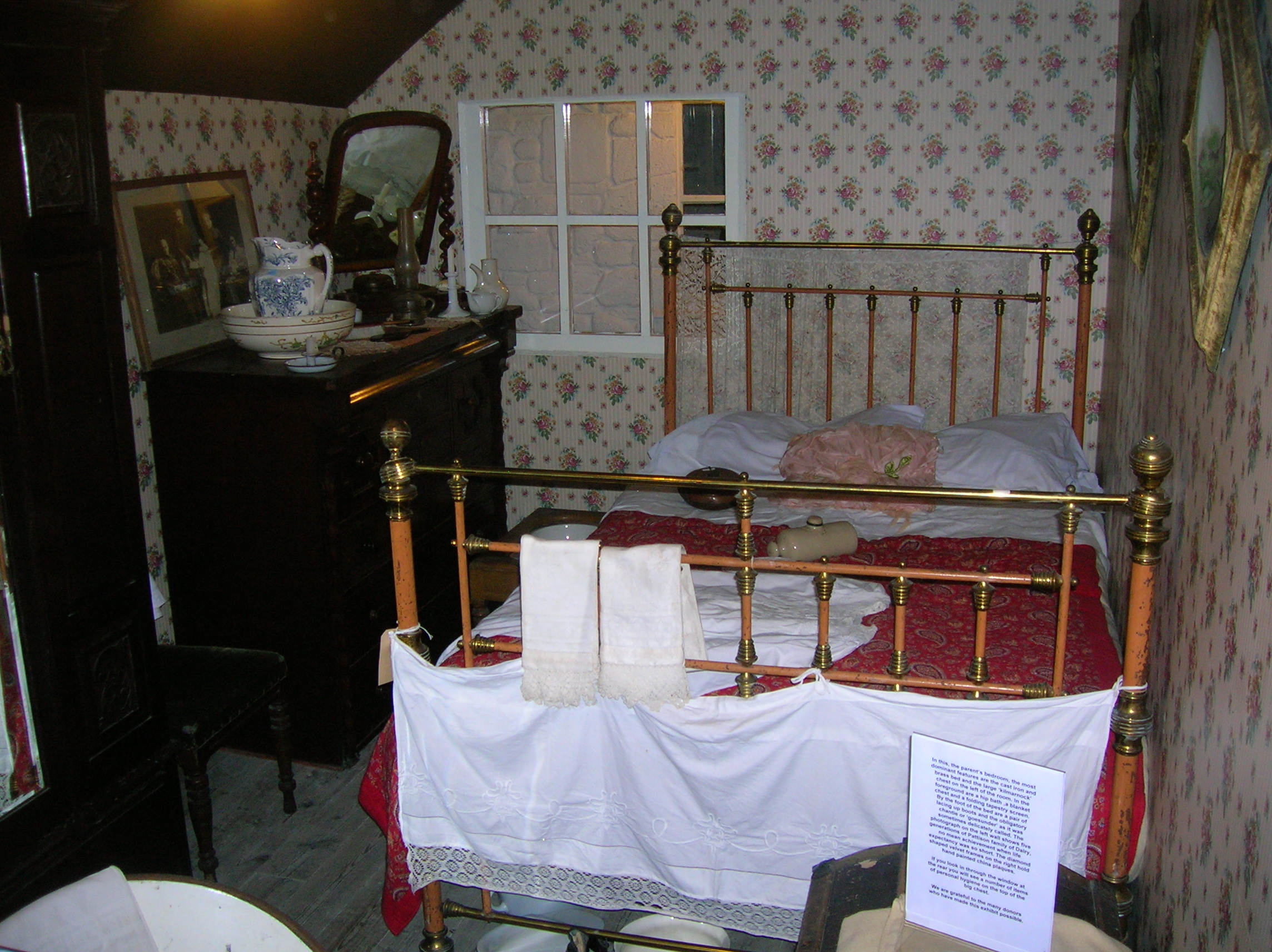
Victorian bedroom exhibition, Dalgarven Mill, Ayrshire

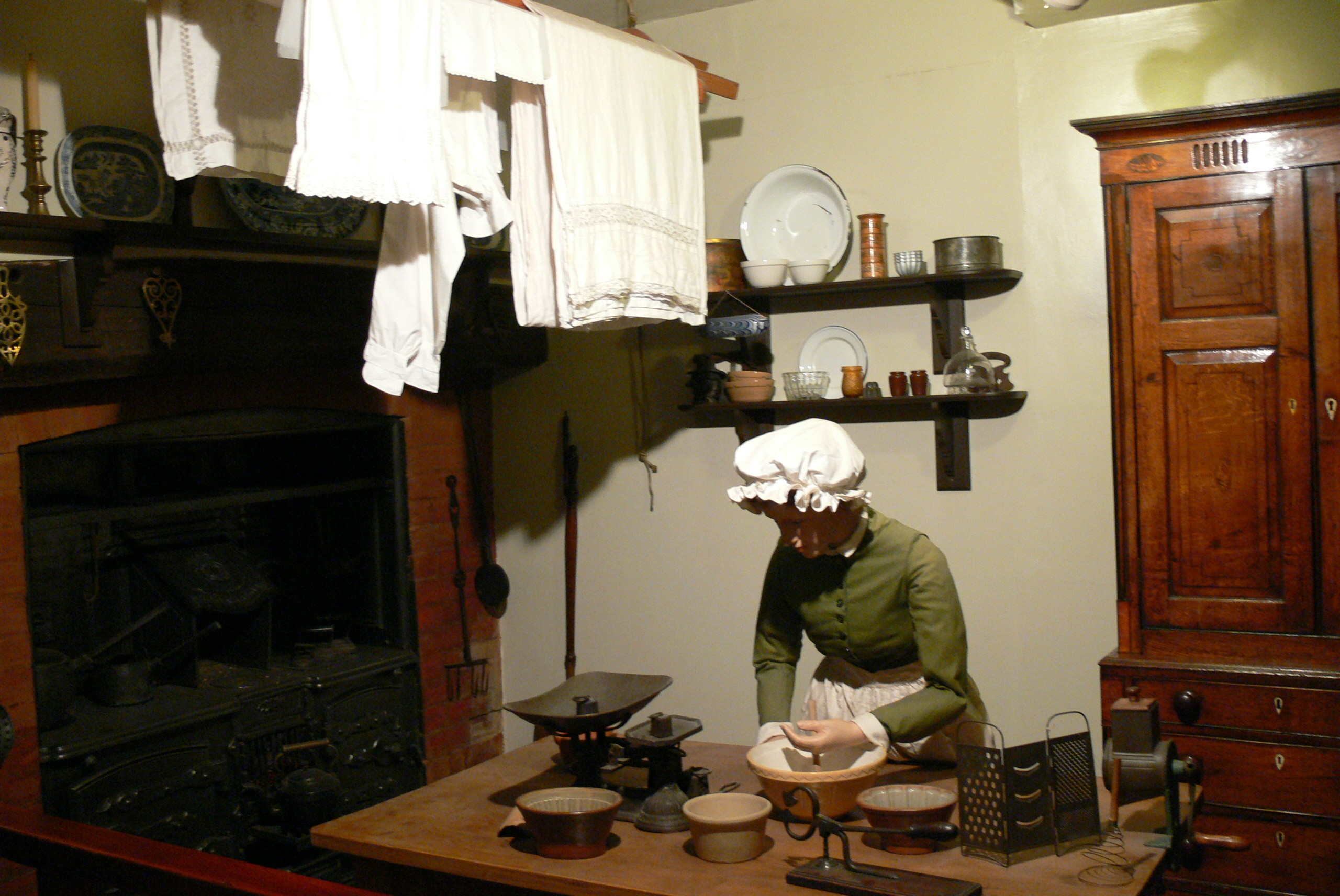
Victorian kitchen, Dalgarven Mill, Ayrshire

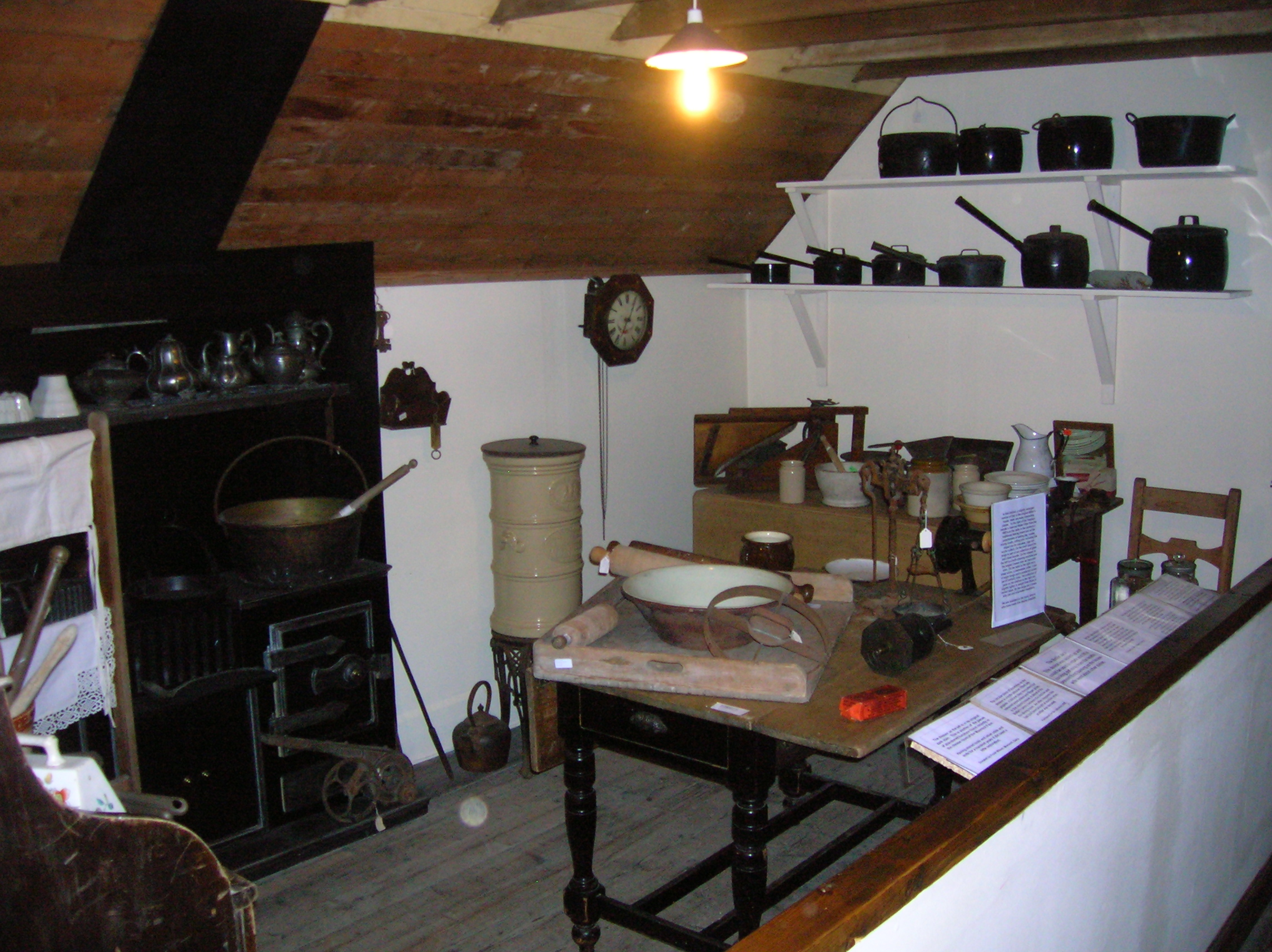
Victorian kitchen, Dalgarven

=== Preserved interiors, public spaces ===
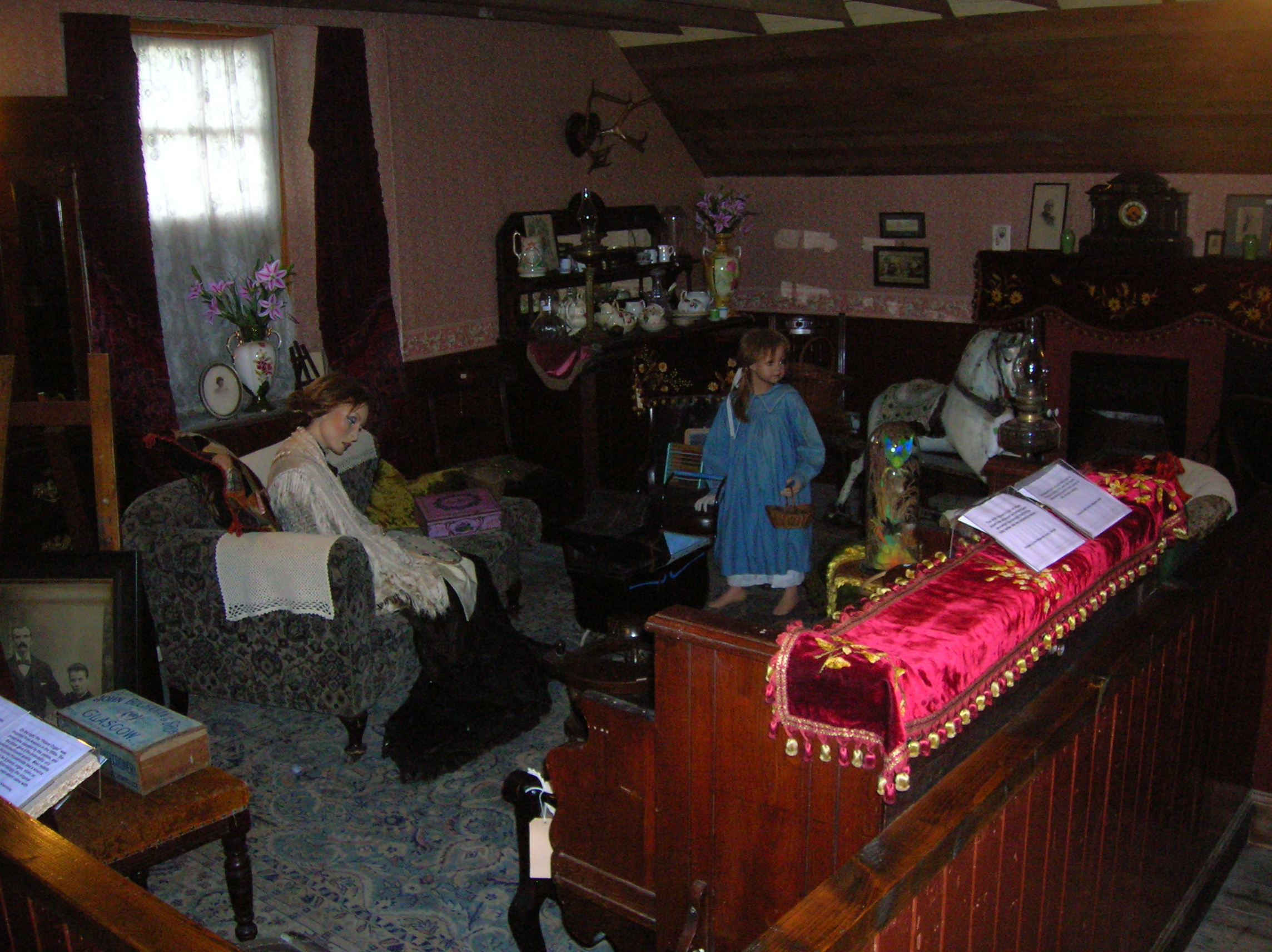
A Victorian sittingroom

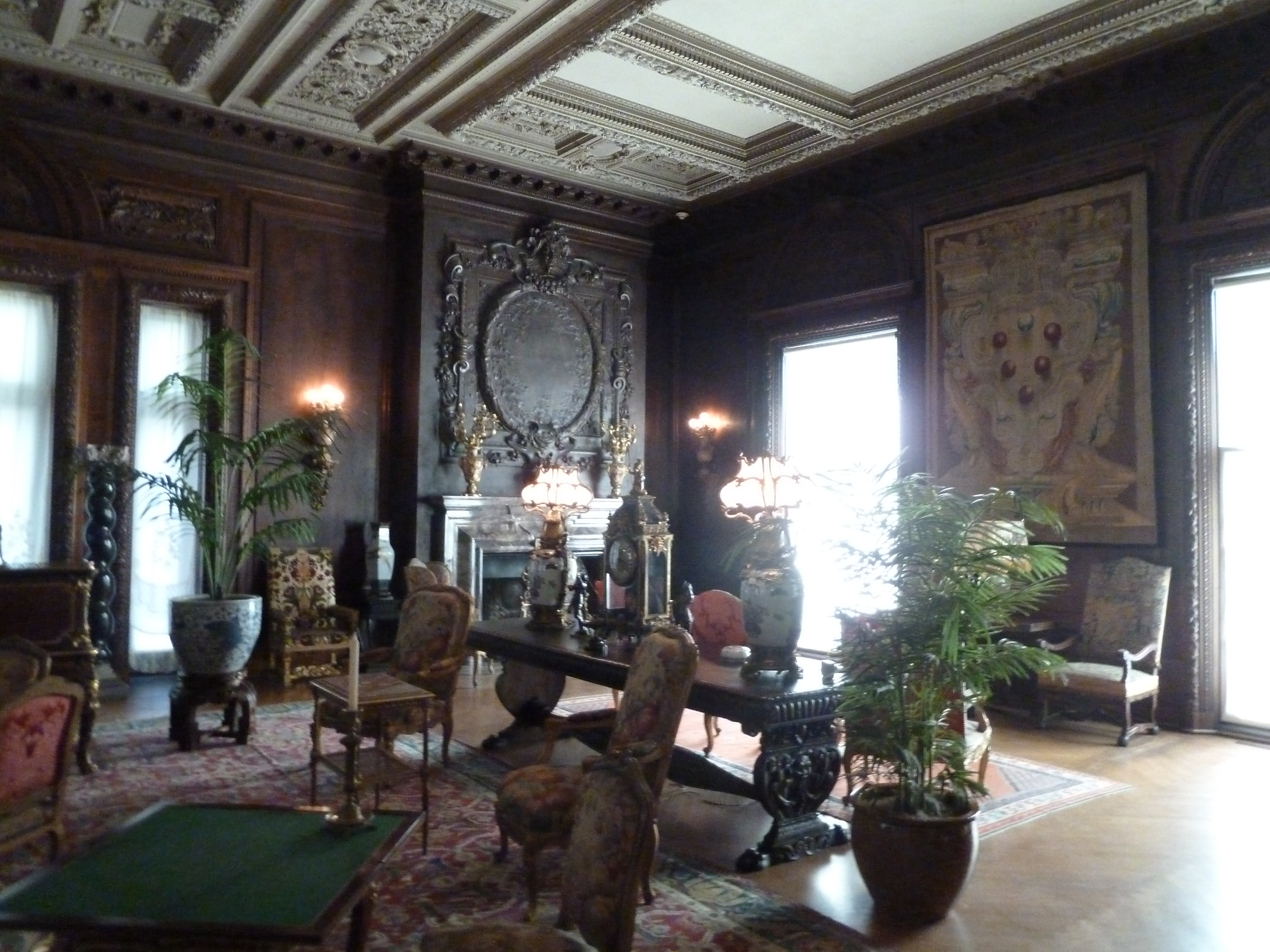
Vanderbilt Mansion, living room

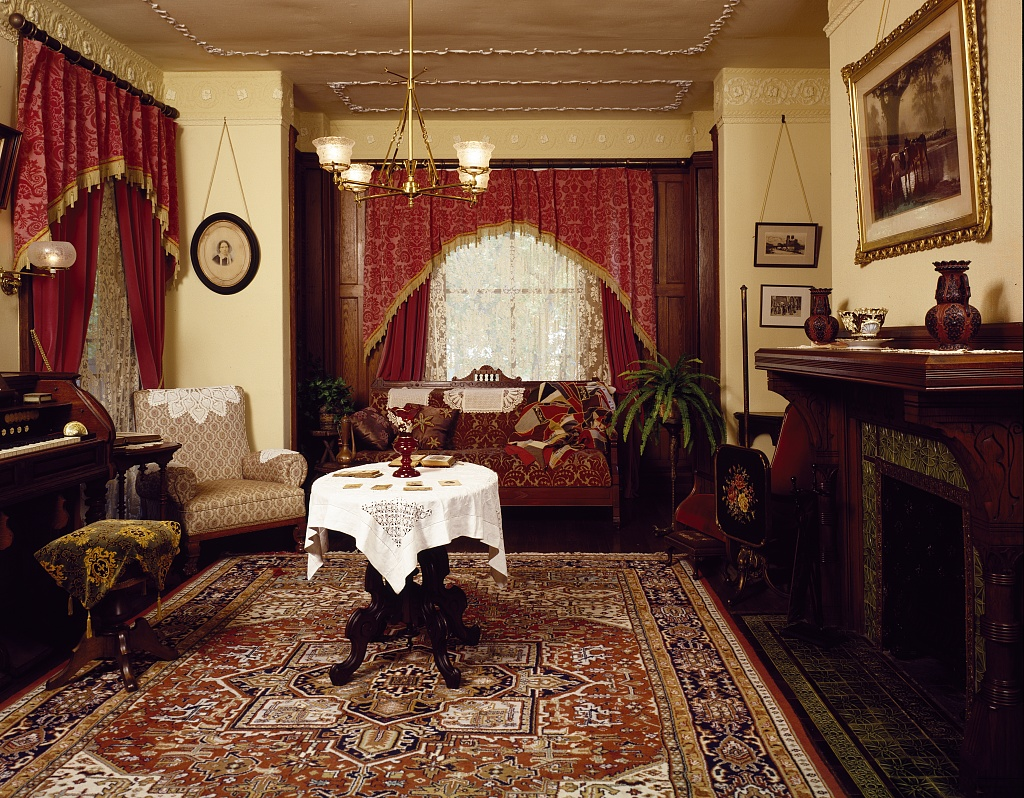
1879, parlor of Emlen Physick Estate, 1048 Washington Street, New Jersey

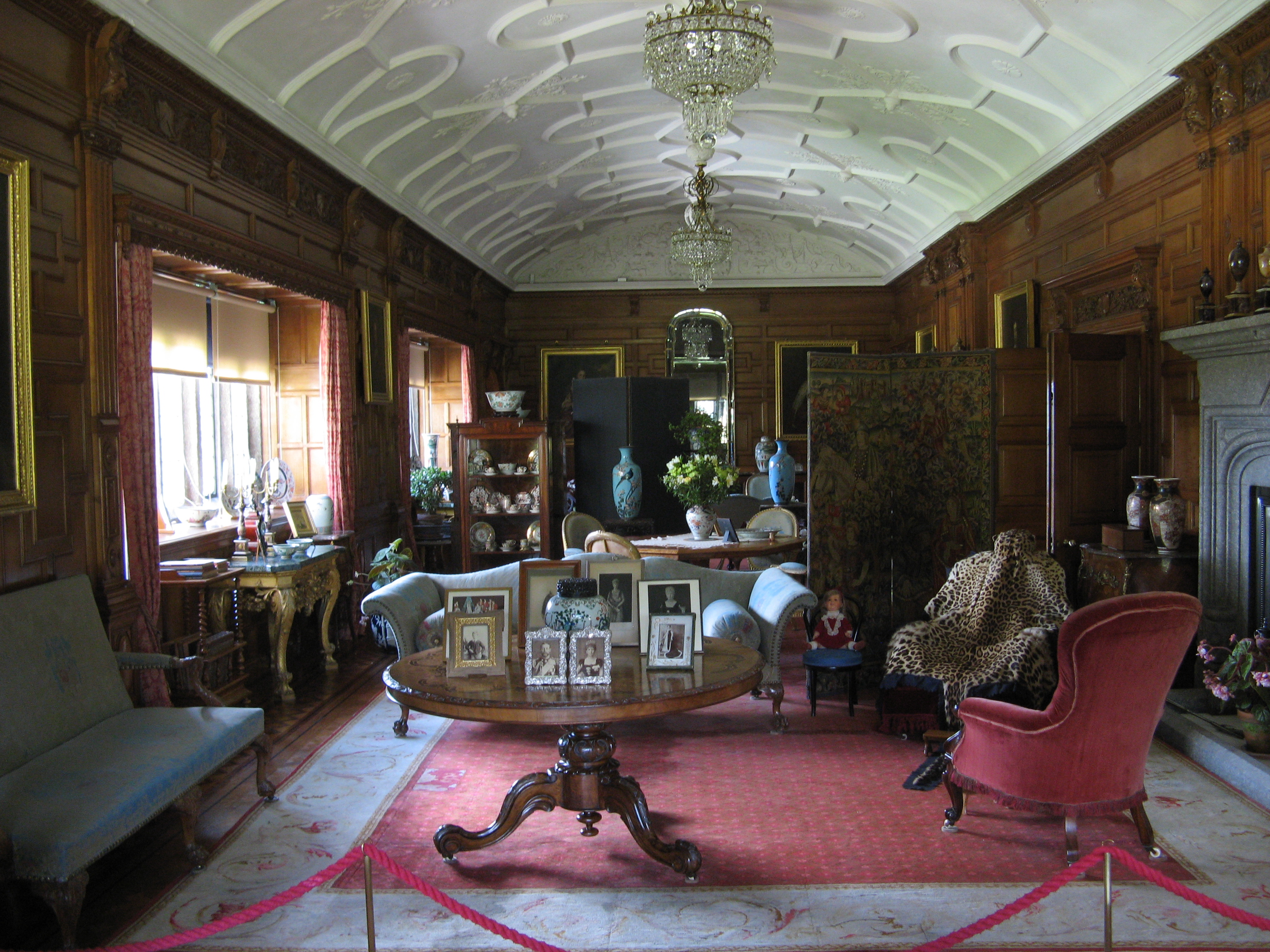
Lanhydrock House, drawing room

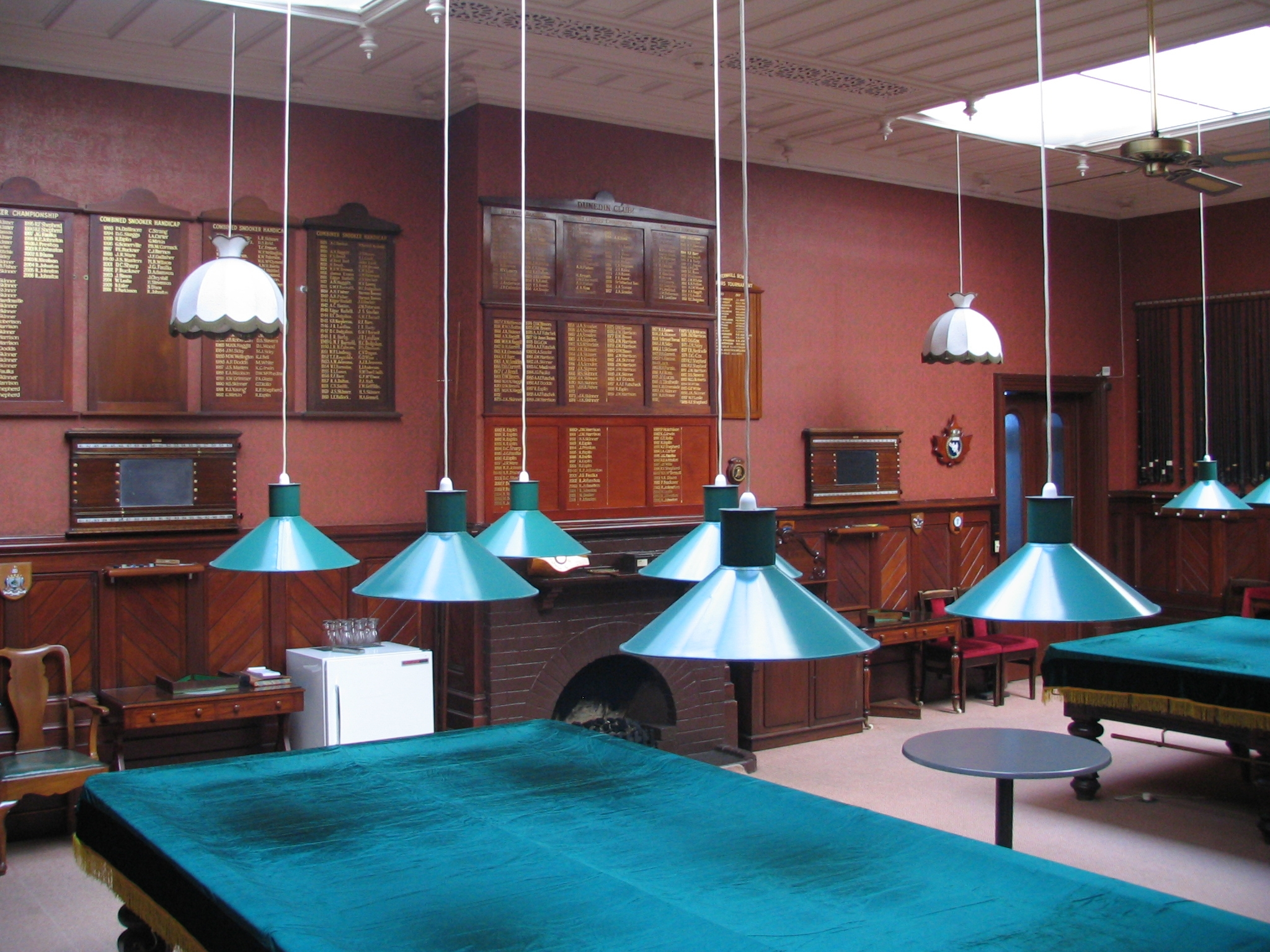
Dunedin Club, interior, billiard room

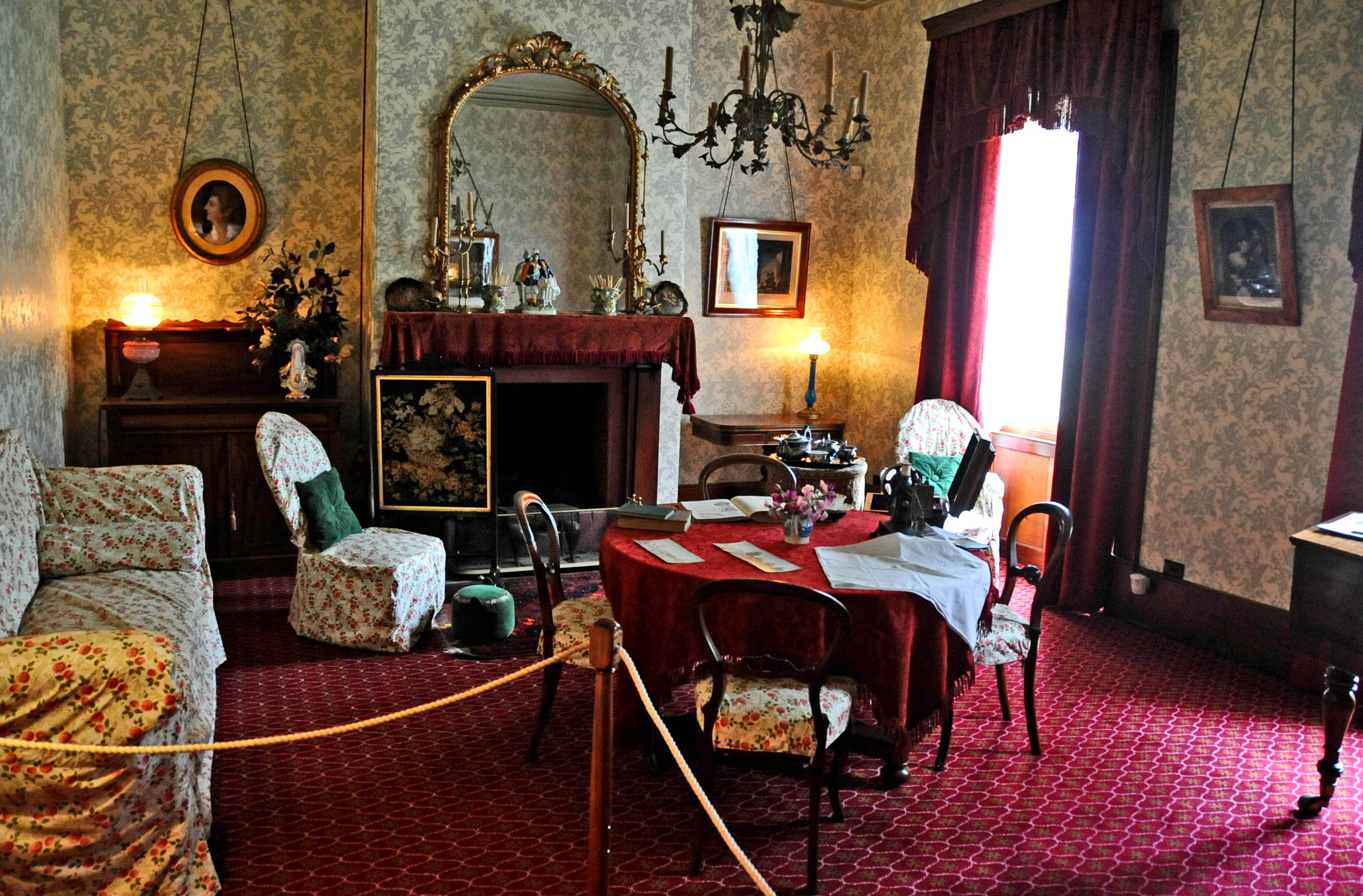
The Commandant drawing room, Port Arthur, Tasmania

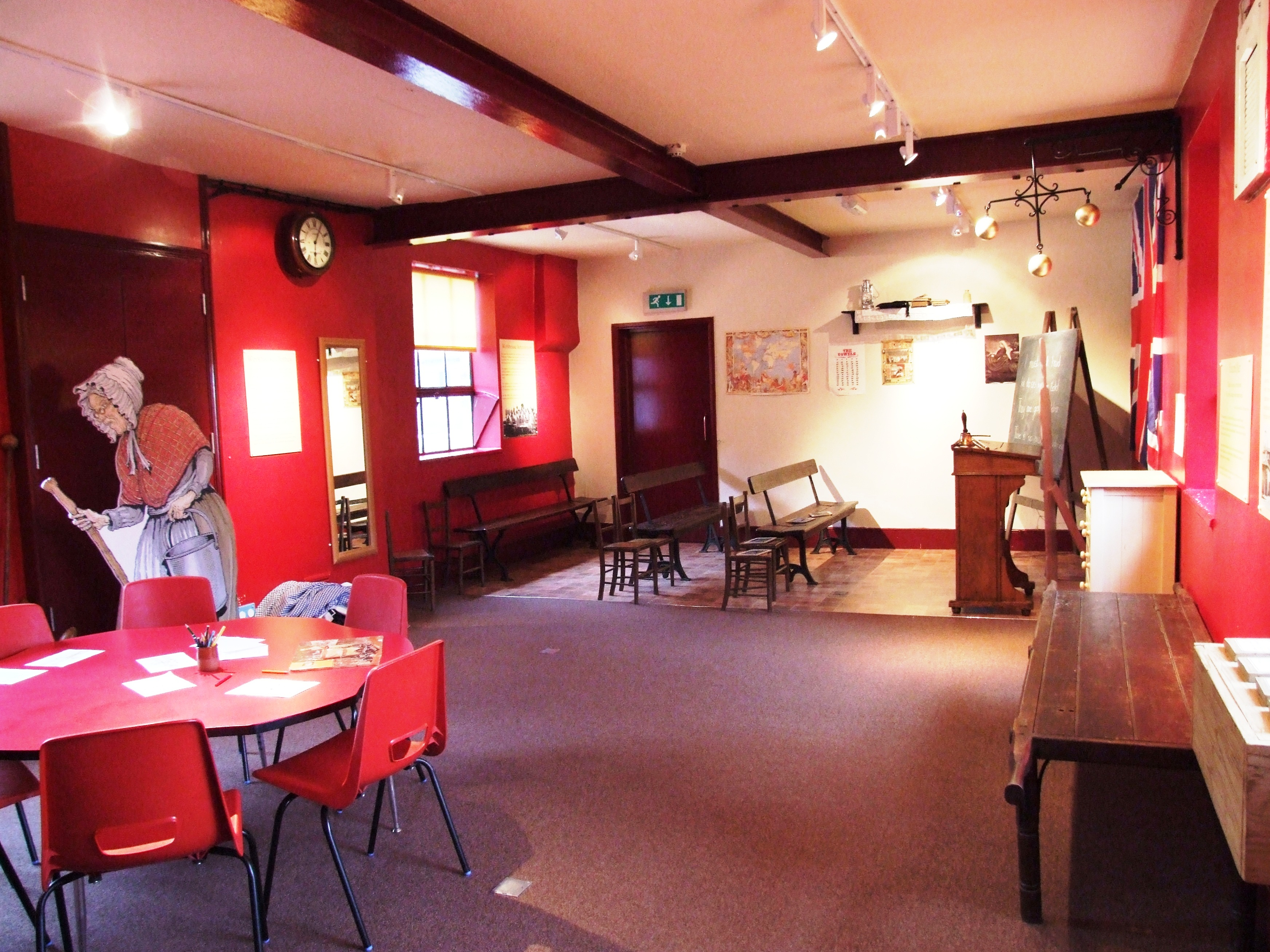
Workhouse schoolroom

=== Walls and ceilings ===
The choice of paint color on the walls in Victorian homes was said to be based on the use of the room. Hallways that were in the entry hall and the stair halls were painted a somber gray so as not to compete with the surrounding rooms. Most people marbleized the walls or the woodwork. Also on walls it was common to score into wet plaster to make it resemble blocks of stone. Finishes that were either marbleized or grained were frequently found on doors and woodwork. "Graining" was meant to imitate woods of higher quality that were more difficult to work. There were specific rules for interior color choice and placement. The theory of "harmony by analogy" was to use the colors that lay next to each other on the color wheel. And the second was the "harmony by contrast" that was to use the colors that were opposite of one another on the color wheel. There was a favored tripartite wall that included a dado or wainscoting at the bottom, a field in the middle and a frieze or cornice at the top. This was popular into the 20th century. Frederick Walton who created linoleum in 1863 created the process for embossing semi-liquid linseed oil, backed with waterproofed paper or canvas. It was called Lincrusta and was applied much like wallpaper. This process made it easy to then go over the oil and make it resemble wood or different types of leather. On the ceilings that were 8–14 feet the color was tinted three shades lighter than the color that was on the walls and usually had a high quality of ornamentation because decorated ceilings were favored.

==== Wallpaper ====
Wallpaper and wallcoverings became accessible for increasing numbers of householders with their wide range of designs and varying costs. This was due to the introduction of mass production techniques and, in England, the repeal in 1836 of the Wallpaper tax introduced in 1712.

Wallpaper was often made in elaborate floral patterns with primary colors (red, blue, and yellow) in the backgrounds and overprinted with colours of cream and tan. This was followed by Gothic art inspired papers in earth tones with stylized leaf and floral patterns. William Morris was one of the most influential designers of wallpaper and fabrics during the latter half of the Victorian period. Morris was inspired and used Medieval and Gothic tapestries in his work. Embossed paper were used on ceilings and friezes.

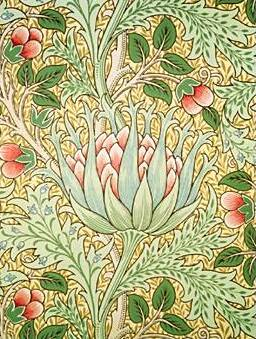
Artichoke wallpaper, by John Henry Dearle for Morris & Co., circa 1897 (Victoria and Albert Museum).

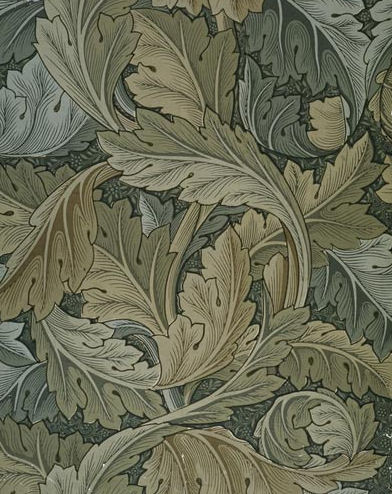
Acanthus wallpaper, 1875

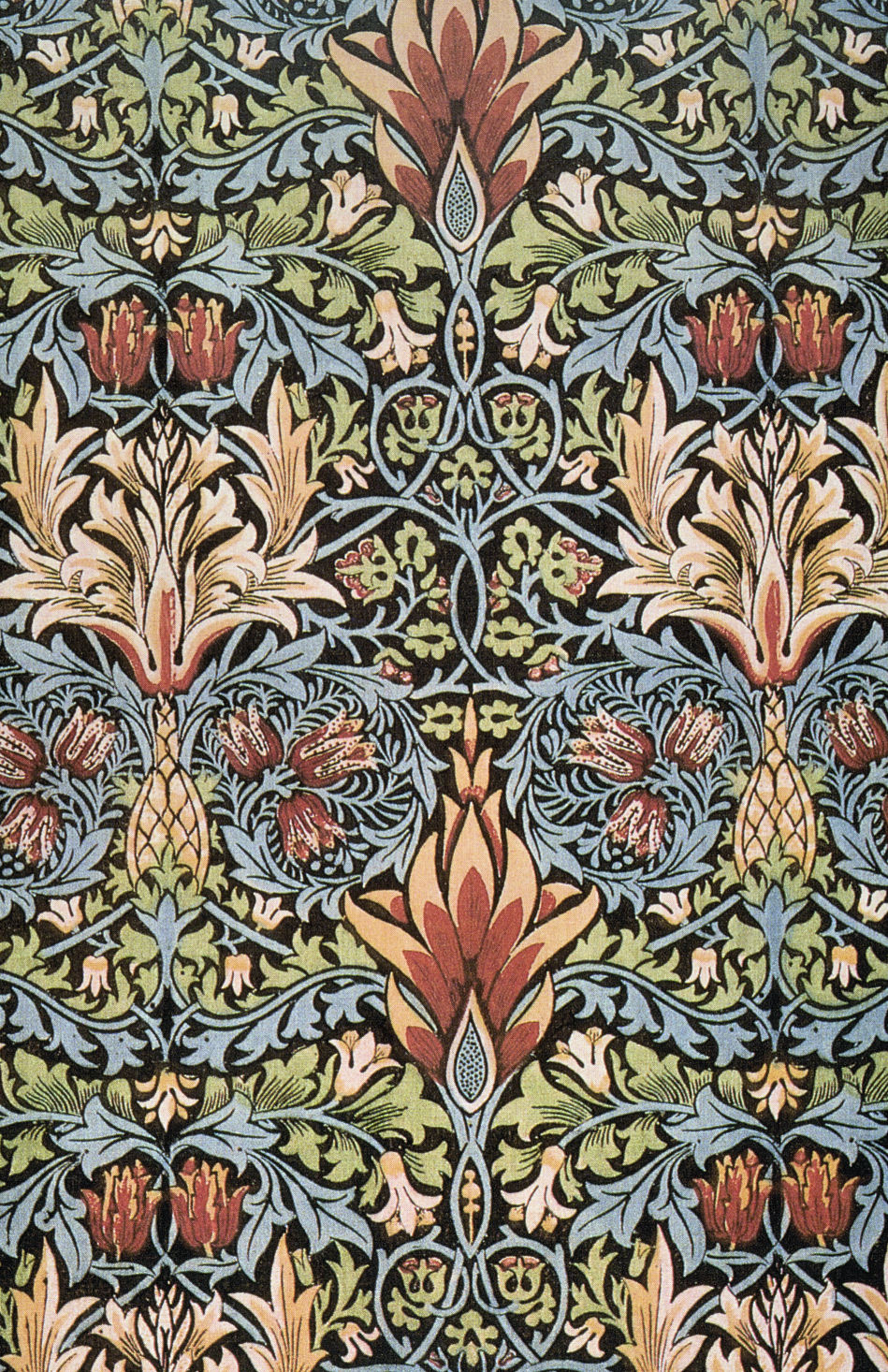
Snakeshead printed textile, 1876

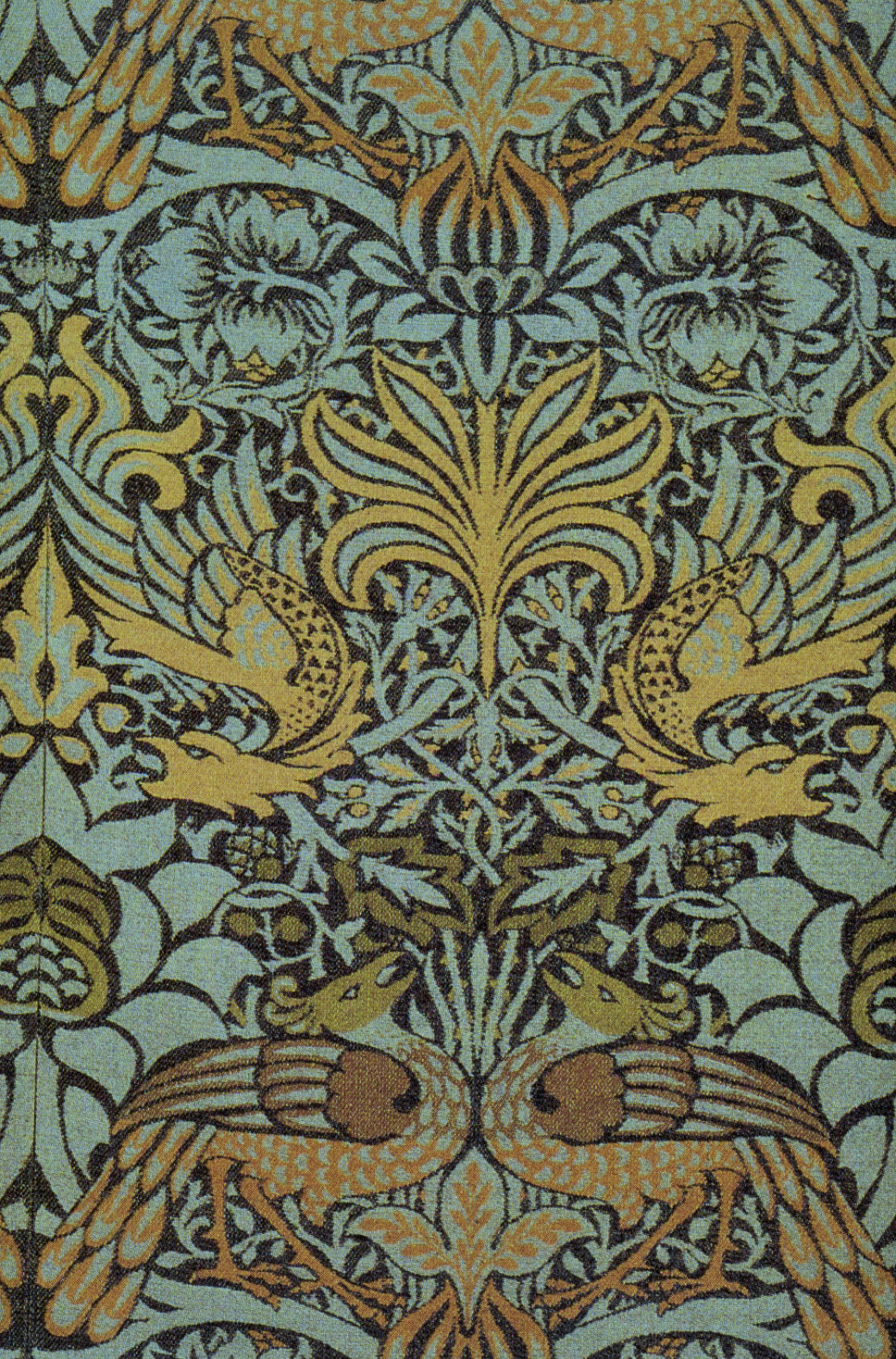
Peacock and Dragon woven wool furnishing fabric, 1878

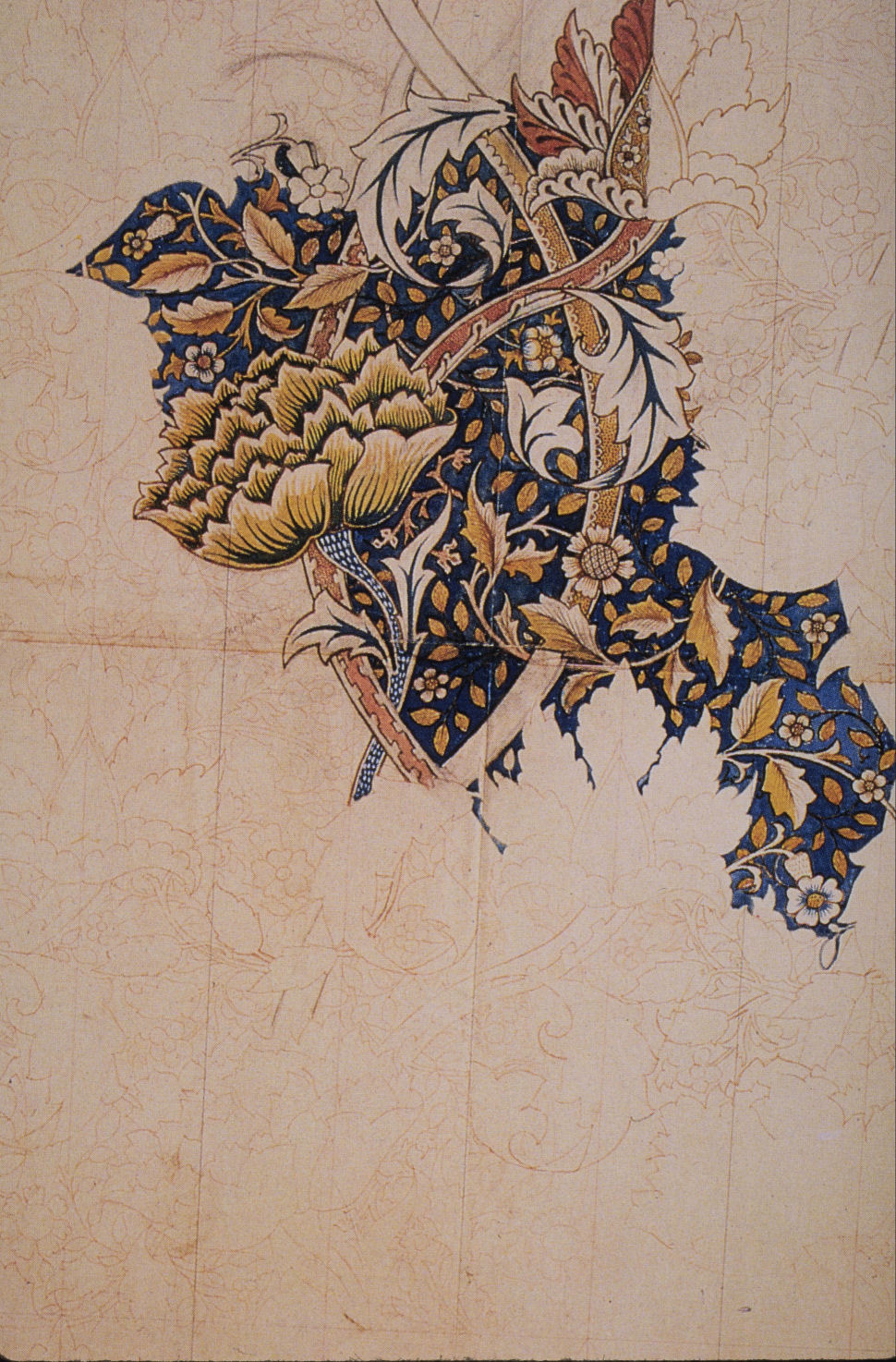
Design for Windrush printed textile, 1881–83

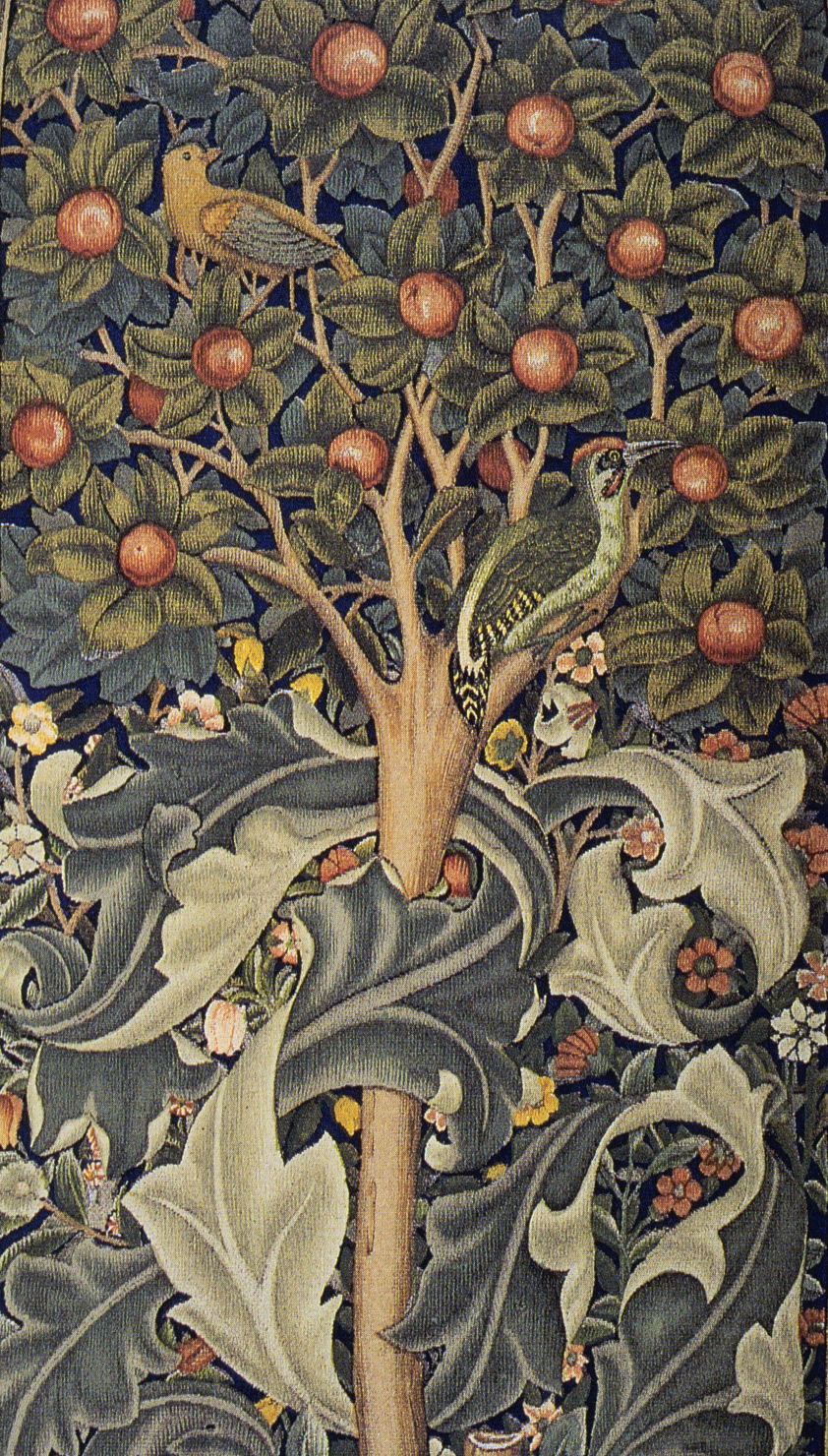
Detail of Woodpecker tapestry, 1885

=== Furniture ===
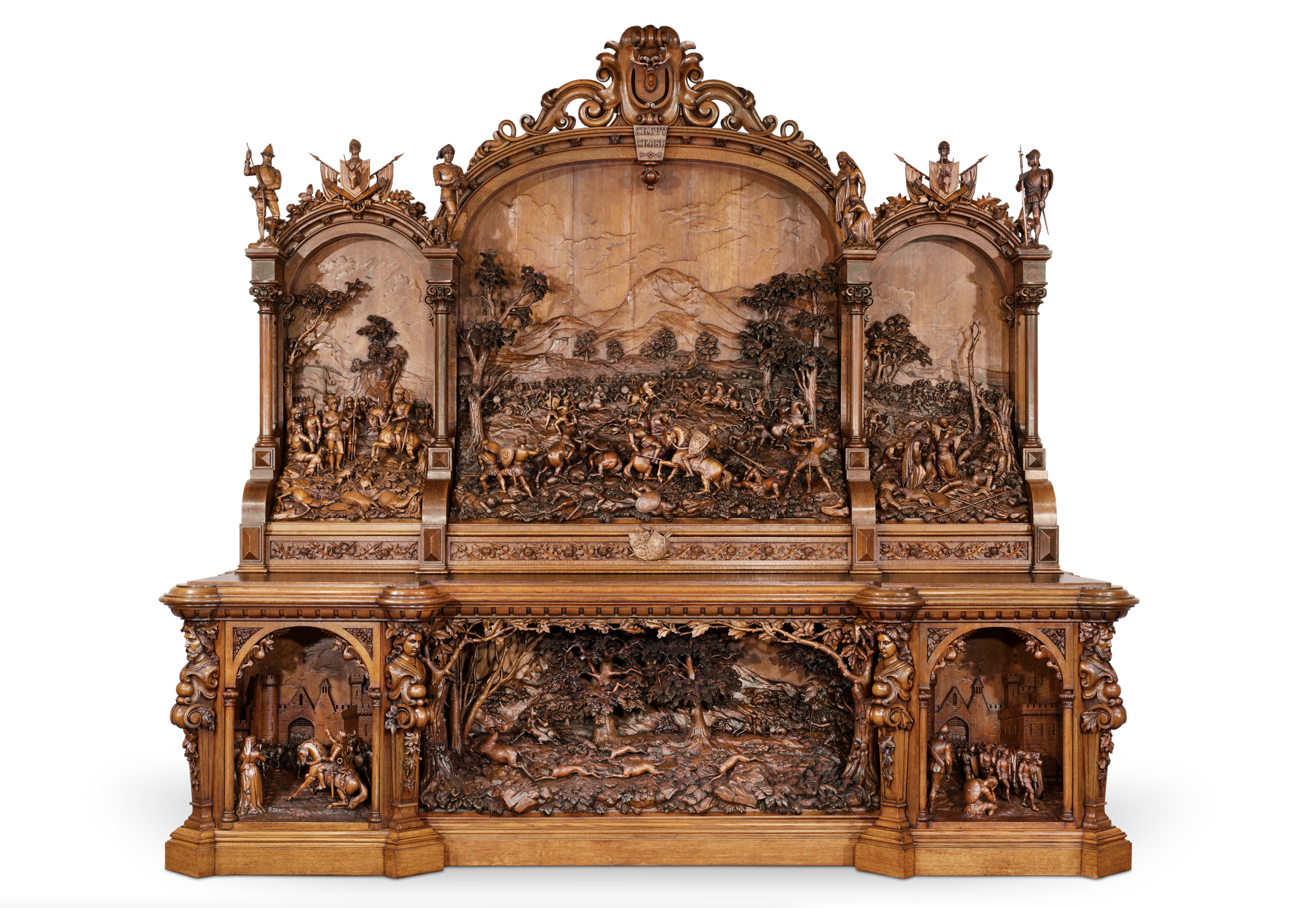
The Chevy Chase Sideboard by Gerrard Robinson. Often considered to be one of the finest furniture pieces of the 19th century and an icon of Victorian furniture.

There was not one dominant style of furniture in the Victorian period. Designers rather used and modified many styles taken from various time periods in history like Gothic, Tudor, Elizabethan, English Rococo, Neoclassical and others. The Gothic and Rococo revival style were the most common styles to be seen in furniture during this time in history.

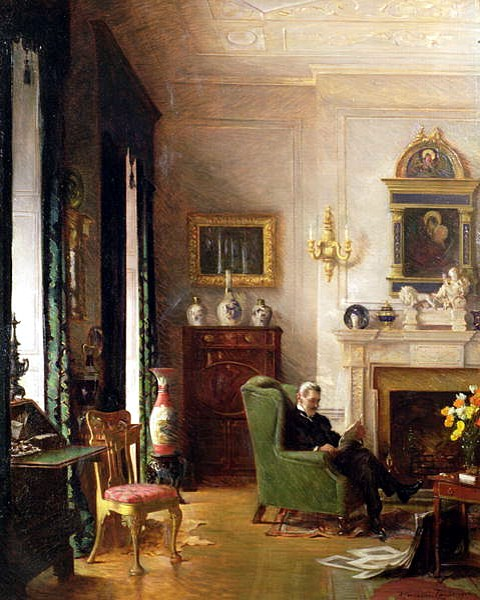
Albert Chevallier Tayler The Grey Drawing Room

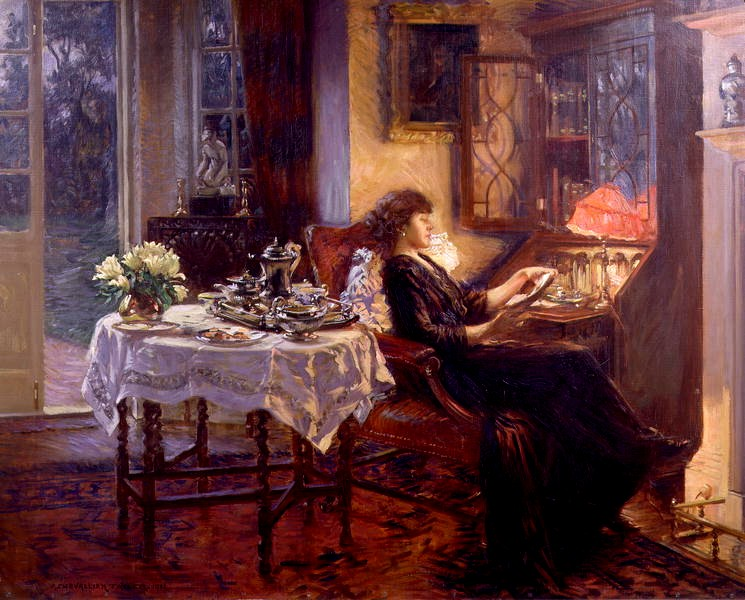
Albert Chevallier Tayler The Quiet Hour

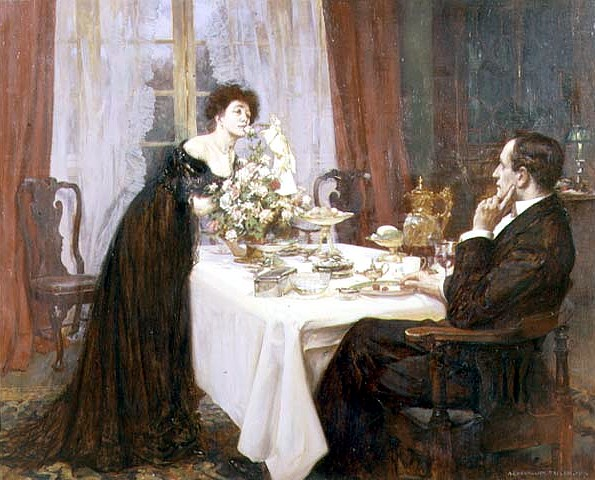
Breakfast by Albert Chevallier Tayler 1909

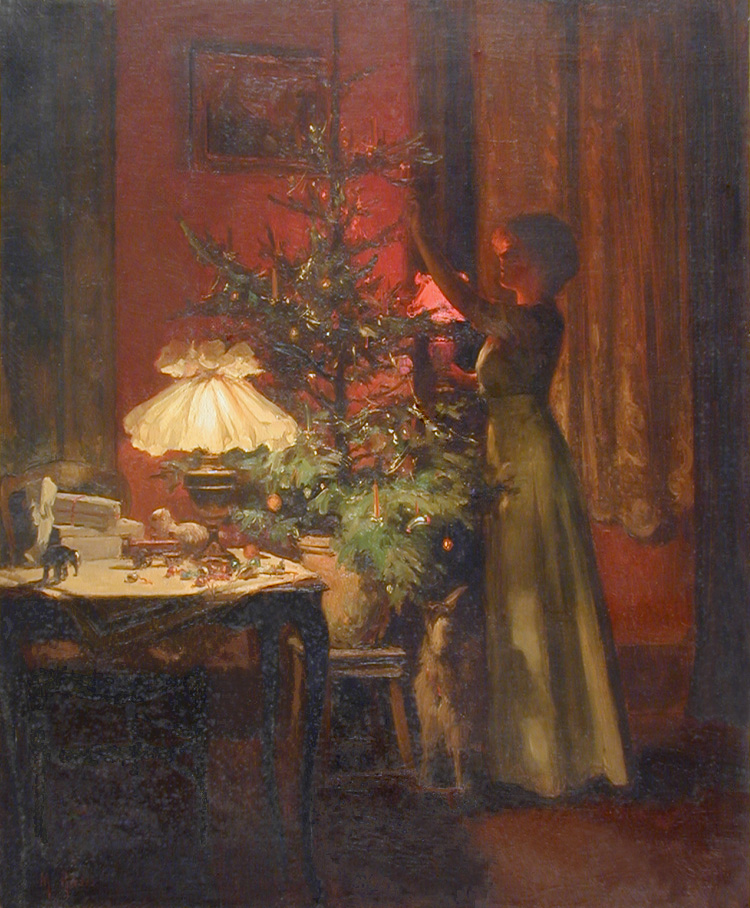
Christmas tree decoration by Marcel Rieder (1862-1942)

== Oscar Wilde's aesthetic of Victorian decoration ==
Chief among the literary practitioners of decorative aestheticism was Oscar Wilde, who advocated Victorian decorative individualism in speech, fiction, and essay-form. Wilde’s notion of cultural enlightenment through visual cues echoes that of Alexander von Humboldt who maintained that imagination was not the Romantic figment of scarcity and mystery but rather something anyone could begin to develop with other methods, including organic elements in pteridomania.

By changing one’s immediate dwelling quarters, one changed one’s mind as well; Wilde believed that the way forward in cosmopolitanism began with as a means eclipse the societally mundane, and that such guidance would be found not in books or classrooms, but through a lived Platonic epistemology. An aesthetic shift in the home’s Victorian decorative arts reached its highest outcome in the literal transformation of the individual into cosmopolitan, as Wilde was regarded and noted among others in his tour of America.

For Wilde, however, the inner meaning of Victorian decorative arts is fourfold: one must first reconstruct one’s inside so as to grasp what is outside in terms of both living quarters and mind, whilst hearkening back to von Humboldt on the way to Plato so as to be immersed in contemporaneous cosmopolitanism, thereby in the ideal state becoming oneself admirably aesthetical.

== See also ==
- Victorian fashion – Fashions and trends in British culture during the Victorian era
- Victoriana – Items from the Victorian period
- Eastlake movement – Architectural movement
- French polish – Wood finishing technique
- Neo-Victorian – Aesthetic movement
- Pteridomania – Popular craze in late nineteenth-century United Kingdom
- Staffordshire dog figurine – Matching pottery pieces
- Hand cooler
- Charles Eastlake – English architect and designer
- Augustus Pugin – English architect and designer (1812–1852)
- William Morris wallpaper designs – Interior design
