= Stuart Pollock =

Irish cricketer and cricket administrator (1920-2017)

Personal information
- Full name: John Stuart Pollock
- Born: 5 June 1920; Belfast, Northern Ireland
- Died: 1 February 2017 (aged 96); Downpatrick, Northern Ireland
- Batting: Right-handed
- Bowling: Right-arm off break
- Relatives: William Pollock (father)

Domestic team information
- Years: Team
- 1954–1957: Marylebone Cricket Club
- 1939–1957: Ireland

Career statistics
| Competition | First-class |
|---|---|
| Matches | 23 |
| Runs scored | 1,036 |
| Batting average | 25.26 |
| 100s/50s | 1/4 |
| Top score | 129 |
| Balls bowled | 6 |
| Wickets | 0 |
| Bowling average | – |
| 5 wickets in innings | – |
| 10 wickets in match | – |
| Best bowling | – |
| Catches/stumpings | 17/– |
- Source: Cricinfo, 2 October 2018

John Stuart Pollock (5 June 1920 – 1 February 2017) was an Irish first-class cricketer and cricket administrator.

== Life and cricket ==
Born at Belfast in June 1920, Pollock was the son of the cricketer William Pollock. He was educated at Rockport School and Campbell College.

Pollock made his debut in first-class cricket in 1939, when Ireland played Scotland at Dublin.

He resumed playing first-class cricket after World War II, touring England in 1947 when he played in both first-class matches on the tour against Derbyshire and Yorkshire. He featured in first-class cricket until 1958, playing a total of 23 matches; twenty of these came for Ireland, with Pollock also playing two matches for the Marylebone Cricket Club and one for the Free Foresters. Recognised as one of the best batsman in Ireland during this period, he scored 1,036 runs in first-class cricket at an average of 25.26, and a high score of 129, which was his only first-class century. He played his club cricket for the North of Ireland Cricket Club, who he played for into the 1960s, eventually retiring from playing due to a bad back.

He remained active in Irish cricket following his retirement. He was President of the Irish Cricket Union in 1980, a role in which he was described as "much travelled, popular and successful." Outside of cricket, Pollock was a competent golfer and squash player, and worked as director in the family timber business.

Pollock died at Downpatrick in February 2017, and was at the time of his death the last surviving Irish cricketer to have played first-class cricket before the war.
