= Hand cooler =

Hand coolers are small, solid objects, typically egg-shaped and made from glass or decorative stone, that were used to cool the palms of the hands. Historical descriptions also record porcelain, marble and glass examples being used by young women attending dances during the 18th and 19th centuries.

Examples of hand coolers survive in museum collections, including later decorative glass versions produced by Steuben Glass. They are also encountered as examples of Victorian decorative arts, including surviving antique pieces and modern reproductions and now can only be found as recreations or at auction.
