= 1788 in Ireland =

- Centuries: 16th; 17th; 18th; 19th; 20th
- Decades: 1760s; 1770s; 1780s; 1790s; 1800s
- See also: Other events of 1788; List of years in Ireland

Events from the year 1788 in Ireland.

== Incumbent ==
- Monarch: George III

== Events ==
- 1 August – English Market in Cork is opened.
- Belfast Reading Society is established in Belfast, later to become the Linen Hall Library.

== Births ==
- 12 September – Alexander Campbell, religious leader in Britain and the United States (died 1866).
- 14 October – Edward Sabine, astronomer, scientist, ornithologist and explorer (died 1883).
- James Murray, physician (died 1871).

== Deaths ==
- 5 March – Guy Johnson, military officer and diplomat (born c1740).
- 9 June – Hector Theophilus de Cramahé, Lieutenant-Governor of Province of Quebec, and Lieutenant Governor of Detroit (born 1720).
