= Woodbrook Cricket Club =

Cricket club in County Wicklow, Ireland

Woodbrook Cricket Club was a leading Irish cricket club in Bray, County Wicklow from 1905–1913.

== History ==
Following the death of Sir Henry Cochrane in 1904, his son, Stanley Cochrane inherited his fortune and his Woodbrook Estate, located outside of Bray, County Wicklow. A keen cricketer from his days at Trinity College Dublin, Cochrane decided to form a cricket club on his newly inherited estate in 1905, laying out a private cricket ground. He paid around £1,000 to have hundreds of tonnes of clay imported from Nottinghamshire, England to ensure a top-class playing surface, constructed an indoor cricket school, and hired half a dozen English professional cricketers. Cochrane's vision was to entice the best Irish and English cricketers to represent his new cricket club, as well as bringing first-class cricket to Bray. His ambition to host first-class cricket was achieved in 1907 when Ireland hosted Yorkshire. Two years later, Cochrane's personal XI played the touring Australians at Woodbrook. He also succeeded in attracting professional cricketers to play for the club, including Len Braund, Aubrey Faulkner, Charlie Llewellyn, Hugh Massie, Ernie Vogler, and Teddy Wynyard. The club hosted first-class cricket twice in 1912, and once more in 1913. In the final years of the club's existence, crowd attendances began to drop, and in a desperate measure to revive the club's fortunes, Cochrane attempted to get the deciding Test match of the 1912 Triangular Tournament between England and Australia to be played at Woodbrook, but this request was denied by both boards. Disenchanted by this decision, he wound up the club in 1913 and opted to construct a golf course in its place.

=== Woodbrook Club and Ground ===
The club often played under the name Woodbrook Club and Ground for some of its matches, first playing under that name in 1907 against a touring University of Pennsylvania side, with the team regularly playing under this name against touring teams and English county opposition. The team featured in one first-class match, in 1912 against the touring South Africans. The Woodbrook team, which was captained by Cochrane himself, also featured the Test cricketer Ernie Vogler and arguably the leading Irish cricketer of the time, William Pollock. The 3-day match ended as a draw.

South Africans
326 all out
&
212/7 dec.
Draw

Louis Tancred 131
Bob Lambert 3/64 (18.2 overs)

Herbie Taylor 71
Ernie Vogler 3/56 (10.3 overs)

Woodbrook Cricket Club Ground, Bray
Umpires: James Meads and William West

Woodbrook Club and Ground
290 all out

Albert Baker 90
Herbie Taylor 3/9 (9 overs)
