= Humewood Castle =

Castellated house in County Wicklow, Ireland

Coordinates: 52.9159°N 6.6091°W

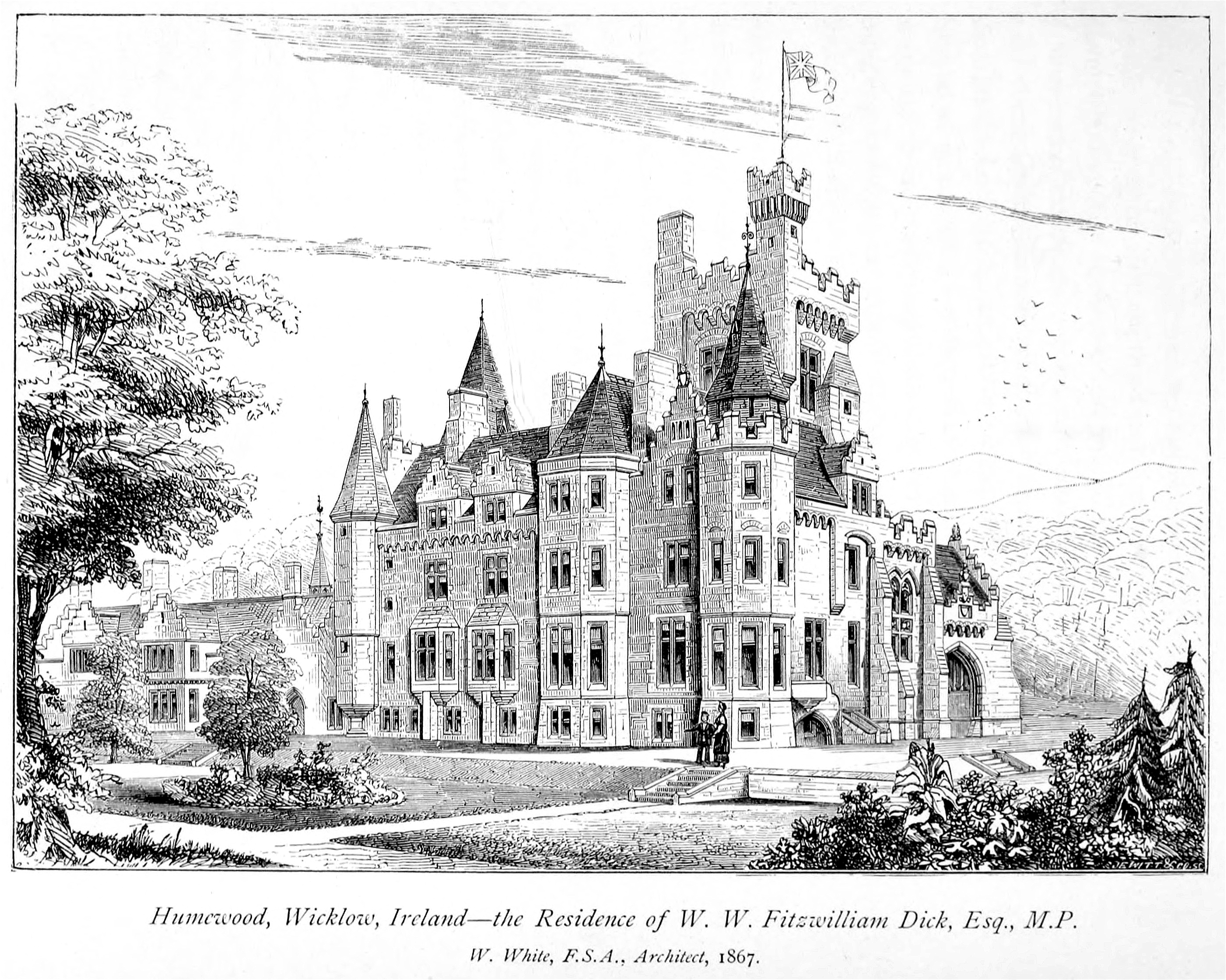
Engraving of Humewood Castle from Charles Eastlake's A History of the Gothic Revival

Humewood Castle is a 32,668 square feet (3,035.0 m^{2}) Gothic-fantasy mansion built in 1870 in 427 acres of parkland at Kiltegan, County Wicklow in Ireland. The mansion was originally built by the English architect William White and extended by James Brooks as a private residence of the Hume family. As of 2024, it is owned by American billionaire John C. Malone.

Built of granite, the three-story main building is flanked by a tall, round turreted tower at one end and a more angular tower at the other. The ground floor consists of a drawing room, dining room, salon and ballroom banqueting hall and a lower ground floor a billiard room, smoking room and wine cellar. The upper floors contain 12 bedrooms.

== History ==
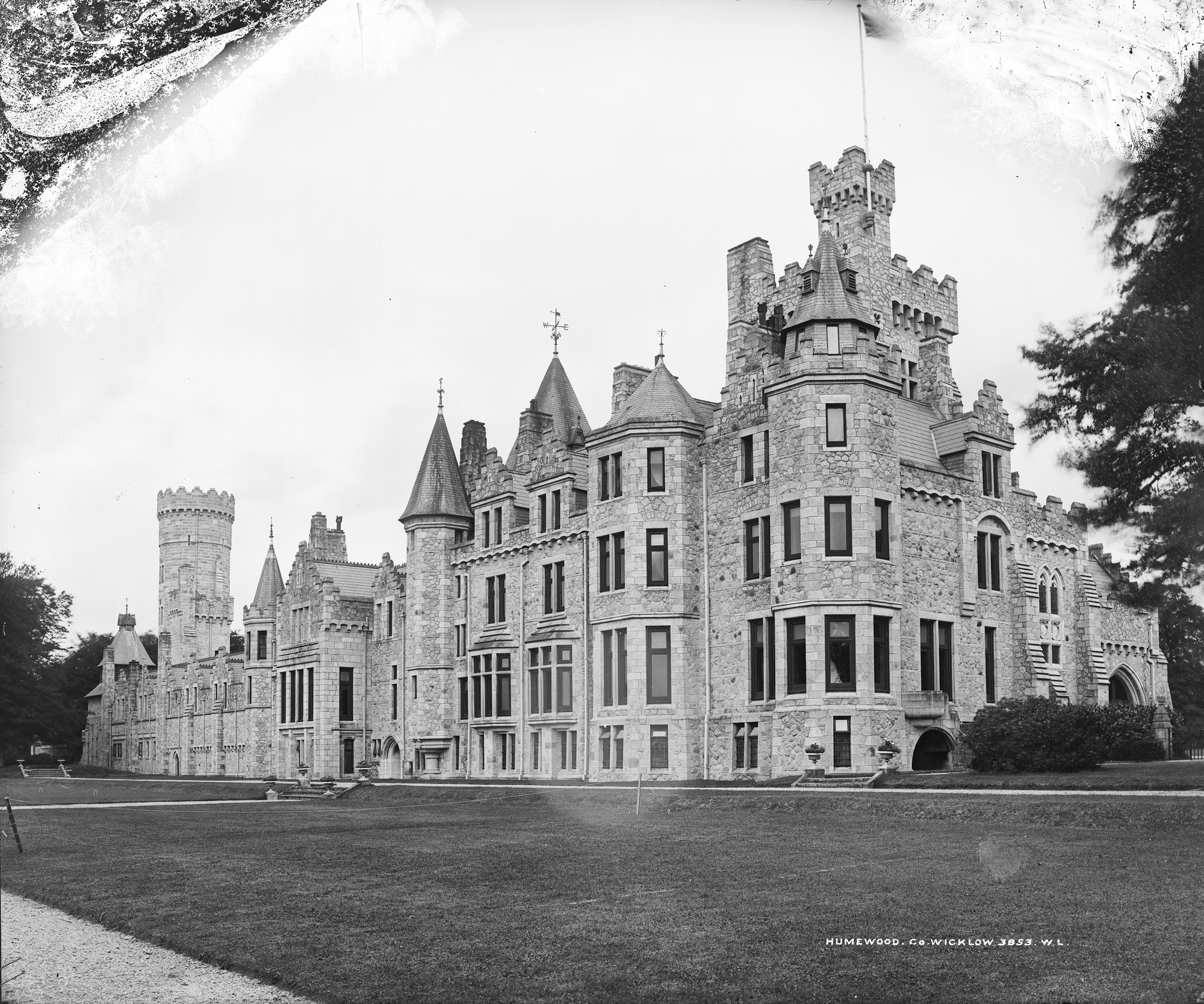
Humewood Castle c1900

The Hume family had settled at Humewood and built a castle there in the 15th century. The estate passed down through successive generations to Fitzwilliam Hume (1805–1892) who was the wealthy MP for County Wicklow from 1852 to 1880. He commissioned architect William White to design a country retreat for the summer and the shooting season and White hired Albert Kimberley to build the castle. White exceeded his brief and the final result, built between 1867 and 1870, was today's Gothic fantasy which far exceeded the budget, bankrupting White in the process. Fitzwilliam Hume assumed the surname of Dick in 1864 under the terms of a legacy. His only son William Hume inherited the property and was appointed a Deputy Lieutenant of Wicklow and served as High Sheriff of Wicklow for 1896.

After William Hume's death the estate passed to his daughter Catherine Marie-Madeleine (Mimi), who had married Jacques Weygand, son of the French General Maxime Weygand. They had no children. Shortly before her death in 1992, Mimi Weygand presented the majority of the estate cottages, including several in Kiltegan, to her tenants. The castle and 450-acre estate were subsequently sold at auction to the German businesswoman Renata Coleman for £1 million.

Renata Coleman developed the house into an upmarket private hotel and introduced duckshooting and polo in the grounds. She marketed it in 2004 at an offering price of EUR 16 million. Coleman sold it to the Galway developer John Lally's company, Lalco, to be further developed. Economic conditions were unfavourable, however, and in 2012 it was sold at a loss for 8 million euros to American billionaire John Malone.
