= High Sheriff of Wicklow =

The High Sheriff of Wicklow was the British Crown's judicial representative in County Wicklow, Ireland from Wicklow's formation in 1606 until 1922, when the office was abolished in the new Free State and replaced by the office of Wicklow County Sheriff. The sheriff had judicial, electoral, ceremonial and administrative functions and executed High Court Writs. In 1908, an Order in Council made the Lord-Lieutenant the Sovereign's prime representative in a county and reduced the High Sheriff's precedence. However the sheriff retained his responsibilities for the preservation of law and order in the county. The usual procedure for appointing the sheriff from 1660 onwards was that three persons were nominated at the beginning of each year from the county and the Lord Lieutenant then appointed his choice as High Sheriff for the remainder of the year. Often the other nominees were appointed as under-sheriffs. Sometimes a sheriff did not fulfil his entire term through death or other event and another sheriff was then appointed for the remainder of the year. The dates given hereunder are the dates of appointment. All addresses are in County Wicklow unless stated otherwise.

== High Sheriffs of County Wicklow ==
- 1650: William Coddington
- 1654: John Ponsonby
- 1656: William Coddington of Holm Patrick
- 1660: Sir Richard Bulkeley, Bt
- 1709: John Knox
- 1707: William Fownes
- 1713: Kendrick Fownes
- 1714: Thomas Ryves
- 1715: George Pendred
- 1726: William Smyth of Drumcree
- 1731: Thomas Eaton
- 1733: William Westby
- 1734: William Ryves
- 1735: George Pendred of Saunders Grove
- 1736: John Stratford, 1st Earl of Aldborough
- 1737:
- 1738: Joseph Chamney of Forge, Shillelagh
- 1739:
- 1743: Edward Chamney of Knocklow
- 1749: Ralph Howard, 1st Viscount Wicklow
- 1750:
- 1756: Richard Baldwin of The Four Crosses
- 1757:
- 1758: James Edwards of the Old Court
- 1759:
- 1764: John Ussher
- 1765: Isaac Simon
- 1766: Charles Powell Leslie of Tubber
- 177n: William Westby of High Park
- 1772: George Carroll of Dublin
- 1773:
- 1781: Thomas Acton of West Aston
- 1782: Hopton Scott of Billygannon
- 1783: Sir Francis Hutchinson, 1st Baronet of Castlesallagh
- 1784: The Hon. Richard Wingfield of Powerscourt
- 1785: Sir James Stratford Tynte, 1st Baronet of Dunlavin
- 1786: Robert Hodson, later Sir Robert Hodson, 1st Baronet of Tuitestown
- 1788: Morley Saunders of Saunders Grove
- 1789: Richard Hornidge of Tulfarris
- 1791: Arthur Knox of Woodstock
- 1804: Francis W. Greene
- 1805: Humphrey Loftus Bland
- 1805: John Middleton Scott
- 1806: Edward Westley
- 1807: James Wall
- 1807: Edward Westby of High Park
- 1808: John Blashford
- 1809: John Knox of Castlerea and Woodstock
- 1810: George M. John Drought
- 1811: J. A. Eccles
- 1812: Charles Tottenham of Ballycurry and New Ross
- 1813: Robert Howard
- 1814: John Hornedge
- 1815: John Stratford Saunders
- 1816: Daniel Mills King
- 1817: Francis Hoey
- 1818: Robert Gunn
- 1819: John Synge
- 1820: William Acton
- 1821: Alexander Carroll of Mountjoy Sq., Dublin
- 1822: Robert Francis Saunders of Saunders Grove
- 1823: Thomas Hugo
- 1824: Robert Holt Truell, of Clomannin
- 1825: Sir Robert Arair Hodson, 2nd Baronet, of Hollybrook.
- 1827: William John Westby, jnr of High Park, Hacketstown
- 1827: Daniel Tighe of Rossanna
- 1829: Anbrose Upton Gledstanes
- 1831: Granville Leveson Proby, 3rd Earl of Carysfort
- 1832: William Parsons Hoey of Dublin
- 1834: Sir George Frederick John Hodson, 3rd Baronet of Hollybrook
- 1835: William Gilbert Kemmis of Ballinacor
- 1836: John Henry Parnell of Avondale, Rathdrum

== Victoria, 1837–1901 ==
- 1837: Colonel Edward Symes Bayly of Ballyarthur
- 1838: David Charles la Touche
- 1839: John Michael Henry Fock, 3rd Baron de Robeck
- 1840:
- 1842: Joseph Pratt Tynte of Tynte Park, Dunlavin
- 1843: Francis Synge of Glanmore Castle
- 1844: William Wentworth Fitzwilliam Hume of Humewood
- 1845: Charles Tottenham of Ballycurry and New Ross
- 1846:
- 1847: Robert Craven Wade of Clonebraney
- 1848: William Brabazon, 11th Earl of Meath of Kilruddery House
- 1849: Robert Archibald Gun-Cunningham, of Mountkennedy, Newtownmountkennedy
- 1850: Richard H. Brooke of Castle Howard, Rathdrum
- 1851:
- 1856: Andrew Byrne of Croneyburne, Rathdrum
- 1857: Thomas Acton of West Aston
- 1858: Joseph Salkeld of Connoree, Rathdrum
- 1859: Charles John Tottenham of Tottenham Green
- 1860: William Robert La Touche of Bellevue
- 1862: Coote Alexander Carroll of Ashford
- 1863: Phineas Riall of Old Conna Hill
- 1864:
- 1865: George Booth
- 1866: William Proby, 5th Earl of Carysfort
- 1867: Sir St Vincent Bentinck Hawkins-Whitshed, 3rd Baronet
- 1868: Robert Francis Ellis of Sea Park (now called Magherymore)
- 1869: Richard Hornidge of Tulfarris
- 1870: David Mahoney
- 1870: O'Neill Segrave Talbot of Cabra House, Dublin
- 1872: Henry Pomeroy Truell of Clonmannon.
- 1872: William Richard O'Byrne
- 1873: Meade Caulfield Dennis of Fort Granite and Ballybunnion.
- 1874: Charles Stewart Parnell.
- 1875:
- 1876: James Stewart Tighe of Rossana, Ashford.
- 1878: Robert Joseph Pratt Saunders of Saunders Grove.
- 1880: Robert Howard-Brooke.
- 1881: Col. Charles George Tottenham of Ballycurry.
- 1882: Charles William Barton of Glendalough House.
- 1883: Reginald Brabazon, 12th Earl of Meath
- 1884: John Henry Edward Fock, Baron de Robeck of Gowran Grange, Co. Kildare.
- 1886: Cornwallis Robert Ducarel Gun Cuninghame of Mount Kennedy.
- 1887: Henry Power Charles Stanley Monck, 5th Viscount Monck.
- 1888: Charles Robert Worsley Tottenham of Tottenham Green
- 1889: Lieut.-Col. D'Oyly Cade Battley of Belvedere Hall.
- 1890: Charles Edward Pennefather of Rathsallagh.
- 1891: Sir Robert Adair Hodson.
- 1892: Fortescue Joseph Tynte of Tynte Park.
- 1893: Henry Segrave
- 1894: Joseph Fletcher Moore of Manorkilbride.
- 1895: Edward Henry Wellesley of Greystones.
- 1896: William Hume of Humewood Castle
- 1897: Henry Cochrane, 1st Baronet.
- 1898: Quintin Dick Dick.
- 1899: Richard Joseph Hornidge of Tulfarris.
- 1900: Peter La Touche of Bellevue.
- 1901: Richard Reynell Drought of Glencarrig.

== Edward VII, 1901–1910 ==
- 1902: Henry Leslie-Ellis of Magherymore.
- 1904: William Henry Olphert Kemmis of Ballinacor.
- 1905: Humphrey Loftus Bland of Blandsfort, Queens County.
- 1906: Craven Henry Clotworthy Wade of Rockfield.
- 1907: Roger Casement of Cronroe, Ashford.
- 1909: Lambert John Dopping-Hepenstall of Altidore Castle.
- 1910: Maurice Falkiner Dennis.

== George V, 1910–1936 ==
- 1911: Stanley Herbert Cochrane, 1st Baronet of Corke Lodge
- 1913: Charles Annesley Acton
- 1914: Mervyn Arthur Tynte of Tynte Park, Dunlavin.
- 1915: Alfred Edward West
- 1916:
- 1921: Colonel Joseph Scott Moore
- 1923: Sir Stanley Cochrane.
