= Stanley Cochrane =

Irish cricketer and philanthropist

Personal information
- Full name: Stanley Herbert Cochrane
- Born: 19 September 1877; Dublin, Ireland
- Died: 23 October 1949 (aged 72); Bray, Leinster, Ireland
- Batting: Unknown

Career statistics
Competition	First-class
Matches	1
Runs scored	5
Batting average	5.00
100s/50s	–/–
Top score	5
Catches/stumpings	1/–
- Source: Cricinfo, 21 October 2018

Sir Stanley Cochrane, 1st Baronet (19 September 1877 – 23 October 1949) was an Anglo-Irish first-class cricketer and philanthropist.

== Early life and cricket ==
Cochrane was born at Dublin to Sir Henry Cochrane and his wife, Margaret Gilchrist. He studied at St Columba's College, Dublin, before going up to Trinity College, Dublin, where he was a member of the Dublin University Cricket Club.

Cochrane's father, had alongside Dr. Thomas Joseph Cantrell, invented ginger ale and made a fortune exporting it to the United States under the brand Cantrell & Cochrane. Upon the death of his father in 1904, Cochrane inherited his millions and the Woodbrook Estate.

He worked to bring regular top-class cricket to Ireland, even paying the Australians £300 (the equivalent of nearly £37,000 in 2017) to play Dublin University in 1905. Shortly thereafter, he founded the Woodbrook Cricket Club and built a cricket ground on his estate, even constructing a railway station on the Dublin/Bray railway line to serve the ground. Using his wealth, Cochrane enticed many of the leading players of the day to play for the club, including the likes of Ranjitsinhji and C. B. Fry. Cochrane was the High Sheriff of Wicklow in 1911, and was the High Sheriff of County Dublin in 1912.

Attendances at the Cochrane's cricket ground were less than intended, so in 1912 he invited the touring South Africans to play a first-class match there to encourage patronage, with Cochrane playing in the Woodbrook Club and Ground XI. Playing in what would be his only appearance in first-class cricket, Cochrane batted once in the match, scoring 5 runs before being dismissed by Herbie Taylor. Cochrane attempted to get the deciding Test match of the 1912 Triangular Tournament between England and Australia to be played at Woodbrook, but this request was denied by both boards. Disenchanted by this decision, he closed the cricket ground in 1913 and opted to construct a golf course.

== War service and later life ==
He served in the British Army during World War I, serving in the Royal Dublin Fusiliers. He was made 1st Baronet of Woodbrook in February 1915, for services to sports, music and the welfare of prisoners of war. By war's end he held the rank of captain. He was a Justice of the Peace for both County Wicklow and County Dublin.

Cochrane was diagnosed with diabetes in the 1920s and was one of the first people to be treated for the condition with insulin. With a strong interest in music, Cochrane had transformed the indoor cricket school on his estate into an opera house, and alongside Michele Esposito he founded the music publishing company C.E. Editions. The company folded in 1929 after Esposito's death. Cochrane died without issue in October 1949 at Bray, with his baronetcy becoming extinct.

Baronetage of the United Kingdom
New creation	Baronet (of Woodbrook); 1915–1949	Extinct
