= Charles Eastlake =

English architect and designer

- Born: 11 March 1836; Plymouth
- Died: 20 November 1906; London
- Occupations: Architect, art historian

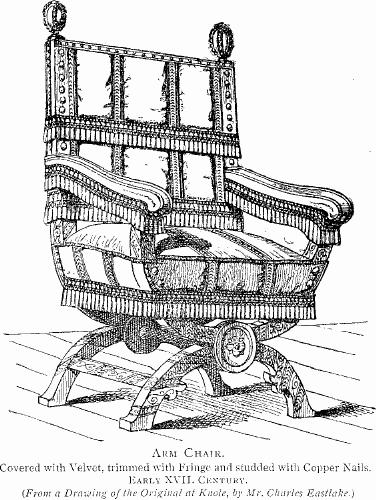
Antique arm chair drawn by Charles Eastlake, whose 1868 book on furniture became influential in Britain and the United States

Charles Locke Eastlake (11 March 1836 – 20 November 1906) was a British writer, curator, architect and furniture designer.

His uncle, Sir Charles Lock Eastlake PRA (born in 1793), was a Keeper of the National Gallery, from 1843 to 1847, and from 1855 its first director, which results in some confusion between the two men, whose names are distinguished only by the presence or absence of an "e" in their middle names. His nephew also became one of the Keepers in later life.

He trained as an architect, but none of his designs seem to have been built. Instead he found success as an author and journalist, and furniture designer.

The style of furniture named after him, Eastlake style, flourished in North America during the later half of the nineteenth century. It was inspired by his book Hints on Household Taste in Furniture, Upholstery and other Details, published in 1868 in Britain, and 1872 in America. The Eastlake movement, an essentially American style of architecture, with English vernacular and Gothic elements, is also named for him.

== Life ==
Eastlake was born March 11, 1836, in Plymouth. His formal education included studies at the Westminster School and the Royal Academy where he discovered an interest in architecture, along with the talent for drawing and painting in watercolors. Eastlake furthered his education with three years of travel throughout France, Italy, and Germany, developing his love for medieval building and architecture. Trained by the architect Philip Hardwick (1792–1870), he popularized William Morris's notions of decorative arts in the Arts and Crafts style, becoming one of the principal exponents of the revived Early English or Modern Gothic style popular during the nineteenth century. His book, A History of the Gothic Revival, published in 1872, depicted buildings of English Gothic architectural style and the Gothic Revival built between 1820 and 1870. This was influential to revivalists interested in restoring the language of Gothic tradition in England.

Although he had the qualifications of an architect, Eastlake did not practice as one. In the years 1855 and 1856 he put forward several architectural designs for a number of projects, including a design for the Rugby Town Hall, but all were rejected. In the years following, Eastlake instead focused on journalism, the occasional design of interior goods, and furniture design. He did not make any furniture; his designs were produced by professional cabinet makers.

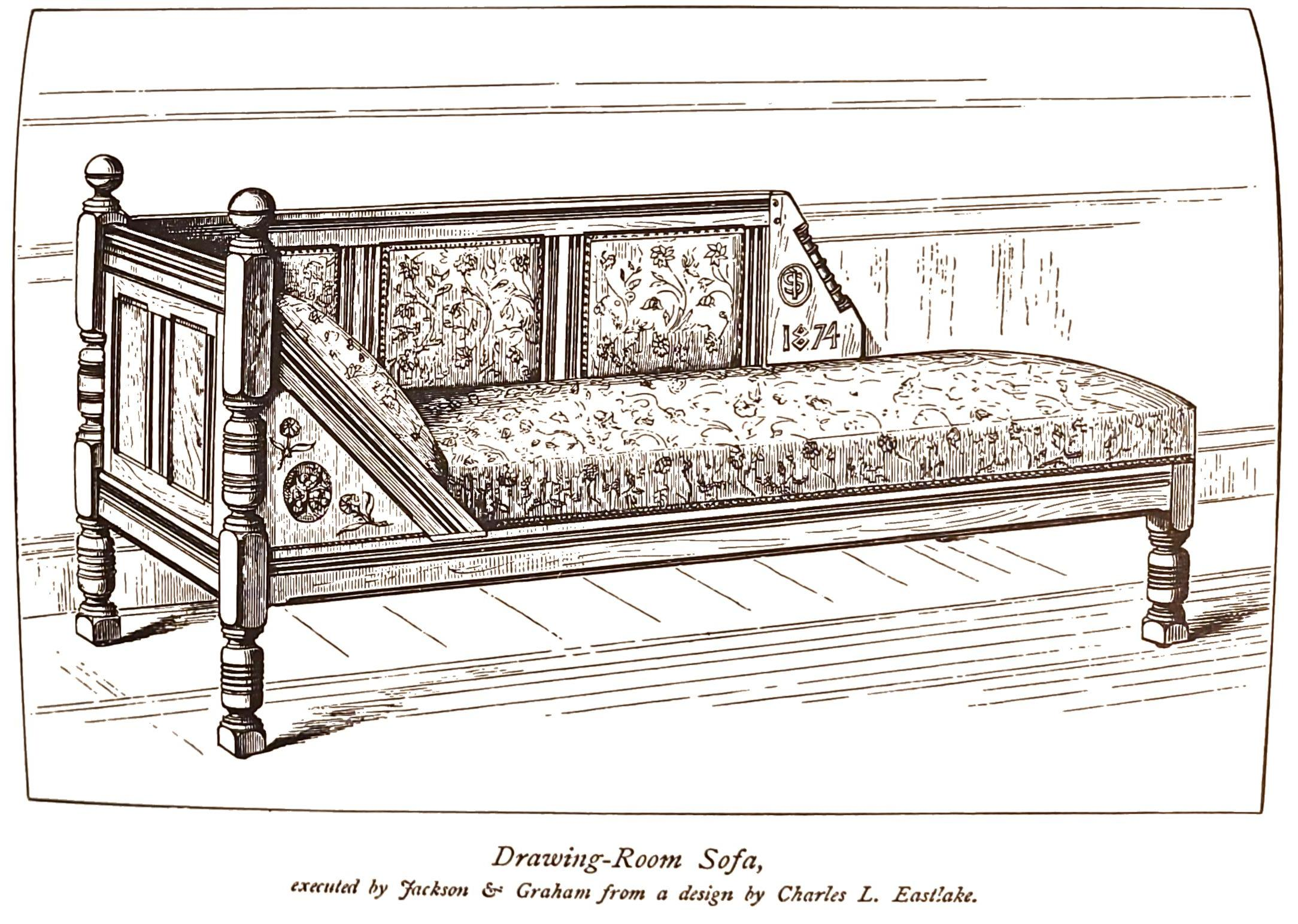
Drawing-Room Sofa drawn by Charles Eastlake depicted in his book Hints on Household Taste

In 1868 he published Hints on Household Taste in Furniture, Upholstery and other Details, which was very influential in Britain, and later in the United States, where the book was published in 1872. From 1866 to 1877 he was secretary to the Royal Institute of British Architects, and from 1878 to 1898 he was Keeper of the National Gallery, London.

He died, aged 70, at Leinster Square, Bayswater, and was buried at Kensal Green.

== Artistic recognition ==
A bust of Eastlake by John Gibson is held in the National Portrait Gallery, London.

== See also ==
- Humewood Castle
- Stick-Eastlake

== Bibliography ==
- A History of the Gothic Revival: an Attempt to Show How the Taste for Mediæval Architecture, which Lingered in England during the Two Last Centuries Has since Been Encouraged and Developed. Publisher: Longmans, Green & Co., London 1872;
- Hints on Household Taste in Furniture, Upholstery, and Other Details. Edited by Charles C. Perkins. Publisher: J. R. Osgood, Boston 1874
- Notes on the Principal Pictures in the Brera Gallery at Milan. Publisher: Longmans and Co., London 1883;
- Notes on the Principal Pictures in the Louvre. Publisher: Longmans and Co., London 1883; 1883
- Notes on the Principal Pictures in the Old Pinakothek at Munich. Publisher: Longmans & Co, London 1884;
- Notes on the Principal Pictures in the Accademia in Venice, 1888
