= Woodbrook Cricket Club Ground =

Cricket ground in Bray, Ireland

- Interactive map of Woodbrook Cricket Club Ground

Ground information
- Location: Bray, Ireland
- Country: Ireland
- Coordinates: 53.2165°N 6.1108°W
- Establishment: 1907
- Demolished: 1913

Team information
Ireland	(1907–1912)
Woodbrook Club and Ground	(1904–1912)
- As of 22 October 2018; Source: Ground profile

Woodbrook Cricket Club Ground was a cricket ground in Bray, Ireland. It was owned and built by Sir Stanley Cochrane, 1st Baronet as the home ground of Woodbrook Cricket Club. The first recorded match on the ground was in 1907, when Ireland played Yorkshire in a first-class match. Further first-class matches were held on the ground in 1909 when SH Cochrane's XI played the touring Australians, there were three further in 1912 when Woodbrook Club and Ground played the touring South Africans, Ireland played the same opposition, and C.B. Fry's XI played the touring Australians. This was the last recorded match on the ground.

Fred Stedman was employed at the ground as a groundsman for ten years.
