= Thomas Campbell (writer) =

Irish clergyman and writer (1733–1795)

Thomas Campbell (1733–1795) was an Irish Protestant clergyman, best known as a travel writer and for his accounts of the circle of Samuel Johnson.

== Life ==
Campbell was born at Glack in County Tyrone on 4 May 1733. He was educated at Trinity College, Dublin (B.A. 1756, M.A. 1761), and took orders in 1761. He was curate of Clogher until 1772, when he was collated to the prebend of Tyholland, and in 1773 he was made chancellor of St Macartan's Cathedral, Clogher. He was a preacher.

He died on 20 June 1795 in London.

== Works ==
In 1777 he published (anonymously in London) A Philosophical Survey of the South of Ireland in a series of letters to John Watkinson, M.D. (a second edition was published in Dublin in 1778). It is supposed to record the tour of an Englishman in the south of Ireland, and gives a description of the major towns. Remarks on the trade of the country are thrown in, and Campbell advocates a political and commercial union with England. In the Survey Johnson's epitaph on Oliver Goldsmith appeared for the first time in print. Campbell is mentioned by James Boswell.

In 1789 Campbell published ‘Strictures on the Ecclesiastical and Literary History of Ireland till the Introduction of the Roman Ritual, and the Establishment of Papal Supremacy by Henry II.’ To this was added a ‘Sketch of the Constitution and Government of Ireland down to 1783.’ The book is controversial in tone, and is directed against O'Conor, Colonel Vallancey, and other antiquaries. Regarding the early history of Ireland, Campbell displayed a certain amount of scepticism. He considered the book as a fragment of a large work he meditated, and for which he obtained help from Edmund Burke, whom he visited at Beaconsfield. Burke, he says, lent him four volumes of manuscripts, and advised him to be ‘as brief as possible upon everything antecedent to Henry II.’

Campbell also wrote a portion of the memoir of Goldsmith which appeared in Bishop Thomas Percy's edition of the poet published in 1801.

=== Diary ===
He kept a little diary during his visits to London. It was discovered behind an old press in the offices of the supreme court at Sydney, New South Wales, having been carried to Australia by a nephew at the beginning of the nineteenth century. It was printed at Sydney in 1854. It contains notes of seven visits to England (in 1775, 1776–7, 1781, 1786, 1787, 1789, and 1792). The second appears to have been much the longest visit, but the first is the only one of which there is a detailed account. Through the Thrales the diarist became acquainted with Johnson, Boswell, Joshua Reynolds, and others of the Johnsonian set. He was a shrewd, somewhat contemptuous observer, but gives full accounts of his encounters with Johnson. The diary affords confirmation of Boswell's accuracy. A popular preacher himself, Campbell went to hear Dr. William Dodd and other pulpit orators of the day: his remarks are uncomplimentary. Campbell was in London again in 1795, where he died on 20 June. Campbell's diary was printed at Sydney, in 1854, and reprinted, with some omissions, by Robina Napier in her Johnsoniana.
