= Hodson baronets =

Baronetcy in the Baronetage of Ireland

The Hodson Baronetcy, of Holybrooke House in the County of Wicklow, is a title in the Baronetage of Ireland. It was created on 28 August 1789 for Robert Hodson. He was a descendant of Reverend John Hodson, Dean of Clogher and Bishop of Elphin, the member of a family that had long been settled at Houghton, Staffordshire, England and was High Sheriff of Westmeath (1776), Wicklow (1786) and Cavan (1791).

== Hodson baronets, of Holybrooke House (1789) ==
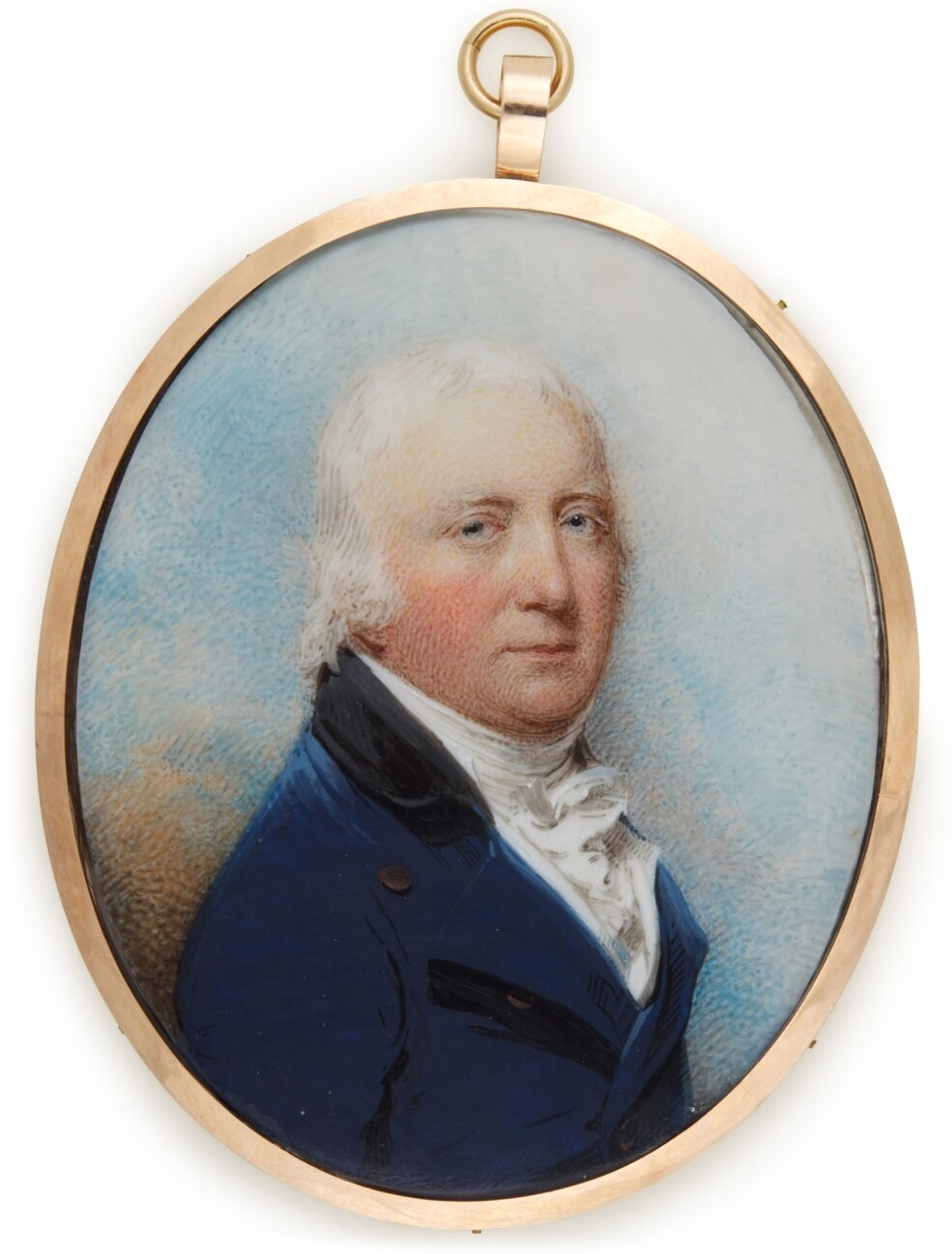
Sir Robert Hodson, 1st Baronet, painting by William Wood, 1803.

- Sir Robert Hodson, 1st Baronet (1747–1809)
- Sir Robert Adair Hodson, 2nd Baronet (1802–1831)
- Sir George Frederick John Hodson, 3rd Baronet (1806–1888)
- Sir Robert Adair Hodson, 4th Baronet (1853–1921), succeeding his father
- Sir Edmond Adair Hodson, 5th Baronet (1893–1972), succeeding his uncle
- Sir Michael Robin Adderley Hodson, 6th Baronet (1932–2022)
- Sir Patrick Richard Hodson, 7th Baronet (1934–2022)
- Sir Mark Adair Hodson, 8th Baronet (1964–2023)
- Sir Edward Charles Adair Hodson, 9th Baronet (born 1998)

The heir presumptive is James Patrick Hodson (born 1966), uncle of the current Baronet. His heir apparent is his eldest son George Patrick Hodson (born 1996).
