= Cochrane baronets =

Set index for Cochrane baronets

There have been two baronetcies created for members of the Cochrane family, both in the Baronetage of the United Kingdom. One creation is extant.

- Cochrane baronets of Woodbrook, Lisgar Castle and Kildare Street (1903)
- Cochrane baronets of Woodbrook (1915): see Sir Stanley Cochrane, 1st Baronet (1877–1949)

Media related to Cochrane baronets at Wikimedia Commons
