= 1939 in Ireland =

- Centuries: 18th; 19th; 20th; 21st
- Decades: 1910s; 1920s; 1930s; 1940s; 1950s
- See also: 1939 in Northern Ireland; Other events of 1939; List of years in Ireland

Events from the year 1939 in Ireland.

== Incumbents ==
- President: Douglas Hyde
- Taoiseach: Éamon de Valera (FF)
- Tánaiste: Seán T. O'Kelly (FF)
- Minister for Finance:
  - Seán MacEntee (FF) (until 16 September 1939)
  - Seán T. O'Kelly (FF) (from 16 September 1939)
- Chief Justice: Timothy Sullivan
- Dáil: 10th
- Seanad: 3rd

== Events ==
=== January ===
- 11 January – The Congress of the Irish National Teachers' Organisation in Galway called on the Government to abolish the ban on married women teachers.
- 12 January – The Army Council of the Irish Republican Army (IRA) sent an ultimatum, signed by Patrick Fleming, to British Foreign Secretary Lord Halifax informing the British government of "The Government of the Irish Republic's" intention to go to "war", the S-Plan.
- 16 January – The IRA began its S-Plan bombing campaign against public utilities on the British mainland with bombs exploding in London and Manchester (where one person was killed).
- 19 January – In Tralee, County Kerry, a small bomb concealed in a tobacco tin exploded in the yard of Hawneys Hotel. Francis Chamberlain, the British Prime Minister's only son, had been staying there during a shooting holiday. The police discovered the bomb but it went off before it could be defused; the IRA nationally disclaimed responsibility.
- 28 January – The Irish poet, dramatist and Nobel prize winner for literature, W. B. Yeats, died at the Hôtel Idéal Beauséjour in Roquebrune-Cap-Martin in France. He was buried according to his own wishes in Roquebrune. Also at his own wishes, his remains were later moved to Ireland, in 1948.

=== February ===
- 8 February – Two Bills giving the Government extraordinary powers were introduced in the Dáil. The first of these, the Treason Act, imposed the death penalty for persons guilty of treason as defined in Article XXXIX of the Irish Constitution. This penalty was to apply whether the act was committed within or outside the boundaries of the State, with the aim of curtailing Irish Republican Army activity. The second measure, the Offences against the State Act, made it possible for citizens to be interned without trial, and conferred elaborate powers of search, arrest and detention upon the Gardaí. It declared seditious any published suggestion that the elected Government of Ireland was not the lawful government. de Valera spoke about the IRA and its S-Plan in the Dáil for two hours, saying that that the IRA had no right to assume the title "Irish Republican Government" and that the Minister for Justice, P. J. Ruttledge, planned to bring "energetic measures" before the house to combat it.
- 12 February – The Department of External Affairs announced that it recognised the government of Francisco Franco in Spain.
- February – In his Lenten pastoral, Bishop Daniel Mageean referred to "A Protestant Parliament for a Protestant People".

=== March ===
- 12 March – Taoiseach Éamon de Valera attended the coronation of Pope Pius XII in Rome.
- 16 March – Éamon de Valera was greeted by Benito Mussolini in Rome and a luncheon was held in his honour.
- 22 March – Irish neutrality was discussed during a Dáil Éireann debate on defence estimates. The Government considered the implications for the export market to Britain if a neutral stand was taken.
- 30 March – The Treason Bill passed its fifth and final stage in Dáil Éireann.

=== April ===
- 9 April – The Gaelic Athletic Association voted to keep the name of the President of Ireland, Douglas Hyde, off its list of patrons. The situation arose because Hyde attended an international association football game.
- 15 April – Boxer Jack Doyle married Mexican-American film actress Movita Castaneda in a civil ceremony in Ensenada, Baja California, Mexico.
- 17 April – The Prime Minister of Northern Ireland, Lord Craigavon, dismissed as cowardly the Irish Government's position of neutrality.
- 19 April – In a speech to Seanad Éireann (the Senate) Taoiseach Éamon de Valera referred to the dropping of all references to the King and Great Britain from new Irish passports.
- 30 April – The 1939 New York World's Fair opened with an Ireland pavilion designed by Michael Scott.

=== May ===
- 4 May – The Prime Minister of Northern Ireland announced that conscription would not be extended to Northern Ireland.
- 18 May – The Earl of Iveagh presented the Government with his townhouse in Dublin.
- 31 May – Seanad approved the Offences against the State Act, and it was put into effect after being signed by President Douglas Hyde.

=== June ===
- 2 June – The Treason Act 1939 became law: a sentence of death could be passed on anyone convicted of "levying war against the State."
- 29 June – Clann na Talmhan, the National Agricultural Party, was founded in Athenry.

=== July ===
- 1 July – The Irish Red Cross Society was established.

=== September ===
- 1 September – A state of emergency was declared by the Irish government when Germany invaded Poland.
- 2 September – Taoiseach Éamon de Valera told the Dáil that Ireland would remain neutral in the European War.
- 3 September
  - The Emergency Powers Act 1939 came into force as Britain and France declared war on Nazi Germany.
  - The Marine and Coastwatching Service was set up.
  - British liner SS Athenia became the first civilian casualty of the war when she was torpedoed and sunk by German submarine German submarine U-30 between Rockall and Tory Island; the Knut Nelson (Norway) landed 450 of the survivors in Galway.
- 18 September – John F. Kennedy flew from Foynes, County Limerick for his first transatlantic flight, to Port Washington, New York, after helping with arrangements for survivors of the SS Athenia.
- 9 September – Billed as "The Last Race in Europe" until after World War II, the Irish Motor Racing Club held its Phoenix Park Race; this included motorcycle and car races.
- 11 September – The Irish-flagged tanker Inverliffey was shelled and sunk by the Nazi submarine, U-38. The U-boat towed the lifeboats away from the blazing oil.
- 13 September – The Minister for Supplies, Seán Lemass, introduced petrol rationing.

=== October ===
- 6 October – Austrian theoretical physicist Erwin Schrödinger took up residence in Dublin at the invitation of Éamon de Valera.
- 30 October – More than two dozen air-raid sirens, acquired by Dublin Corporation, were tested across Dublin.

=== November ===
- November – The teenage Brendan Behan, at this time a member of the Irish Republican Army, was arrested in Liverpool for possession of explosives.

=== December ===
- December – The Supreme Court of Ireland declared the detention without trial of Irish Republican Army members to be illegal.
- 10 December – The German Nazi propaganda radio station Irland-Redaktion began broadcasting to Ireland in the Irish language.
- 23 December – A million rounds of ammunition were stolen from the national arsenal at the Phoenix Park by the Irish Republican Army.

== Arts and literature ==
- 31 January – Lord Longford began a series of Chekhov productions at the Gate Theatre in Dublin with The Cherry Orchard.
- February – English novelist T. H. White settled at Doolistown in County Meath; he lived in Ireland until 1946.
- 13 March – Flann O'Brien's At Swim-Two-Birds was published in London.
- 4 May – James Joyce's Finnegans Wake was published complete in London.
- 18 May – Louis MacNeice's Autumn Journal: a poem was published in London.
- July – W. B. Yeats' Last Poems and Two Plays were published posthumously in London.
- 10 October – Robert Collis's play Marrowbone Lane was premiered at the Gate Theatre, Dublin, starring Wilfrid Brambell.
- Autumn
  - English painters Kenneth Hall and his lover Basil Rakoczi of The White Stag group moved from London to Ireland.
  - English novelist Ethel Mannin settled in Connemara.
- English-born Irish composer Elizabeth Maconchy returned to Ireland from England, living in Dublin for a brief period, during which she composed her Fifth String Quartet.
- Peig Sayers' stories and anecdotes about life on Great Blasket Island were published as Maċtnaṁ seana-ṁná in Dublin.

== Sport ==
=== Association football ===
League of Ireland
Winners: Shamrock Rovers
FAI Cup
Winners: Shelbourne 1–1, 1–0 Sligo Rovers. English footballer, Dixie Dean played in the final for Rovers.

=== Golf ===
- Irish Open was won by Arthur Lees (England).

== Births ==
- 7 January – Tom Kiernan, rugby player and coach.
- 25 January – Dermot Clifford, Roman Catholic Archbishop of the Archdiocese of Cashel and Emly.
- 2 February – Desmond O'Malley, Teachta Dála (TD) (1968–2002) and leader of the Progressive Democrats party (1985–1993) (died 2021).
- 19 February – Ted Carroll, Kilkenny hurler (died 1995).
- 25 March – Tom Fitzgerald, Fianna Fáil party senator.
- 1 April – Joe Jacob, Fianna Fáil TD and Minister of State.
- 11 April – Joe Burke, accordionist (died 2021).
- 13 April – Seamus Heaney, poet (died 2013).
- 24 April – Joe McCartin, Member of the European Parliament, senator.
- 3 May – Ken Hope, cricketer.
- 9 May – Pádraig Flynn, Fianna Fáil TD, cabinet minister and European Commissioner.
- 19 May – John Sheahan, violinist, folk musician and composer, with The Dubliners.
- 28 May – Maeve Binchy, writer (died 2012)
- 29 May – Mary Banotti, Fine Gael politician.
- 8 June – Pat Laffan, actor (died 2019).
- 19 June – Stanislaus Kennedy, nun (died 2025).
- 25 June – Garech Browne, patron of the arts (died 2018).
- 5 July – Hugh Byrne, politician (died 2023).
- 11 July – Mick Brown, football scout.
- 16 August – Seán Brady, Archbishop of Armagh and Primate of All Ireland.
- 21 August – Ray McLoughlin, international rugby player.
- 5 September – Mark Killilea Jnr, Fianna Fáil TD and Member of the European Parliament.
- 10 September – Edward Plunkett, 20th Baron of Dunsany, artist.
- 12 September – Patrick Harrington, bishop of the Roman Catholic Diocese of Lodwar in Kenya.
- 11 October – Austin Currie, founder-member of the Social Democratic and Labour Party and Fine Gael TD (died 2021).
- 16 October – Joe Dolan, singer (died 2007).
- 27 October – Thady Wyndham-Quin, 7th Earl of Dunraven and Mount-Earl, peer.
- 2 November – John Buckley, Bishop of Cork and Ross (1997–2019).
- November – Ollie Conmy, international association football player.
- 8 December – James Galway, flautist
- 16 December – Barney McKenna, musician.
  Full date unknown
  - Michael Coady, poet, short story writer, local historian, genealogist, photographer, journalist and musician (died 2024).
  - Paddy FitzGerald, Cork hurler.
  - Alice Hanratty, painter and printmaker.
  - Paddy Moran, Kilkenny hurler.
  - Denis Murphy, Cork hurler.
  - Éamonn O'Doherty, sculptor (died 2011).

== Deaths ==
- 28 January – W. B. Yeats, poet and dramatist, in France (born 1865).
- 2 February – Amanda McKittrick Ros, novelist and poet (born 1860).
- 9 May – Mary Williams, previously Mary, Lady Heath, aviator, athlete and writer (born 1896).
- 9 June – Owen Moore, actor (born 1886).
- 28 June – James Charles Dowdall, businessman and independent member of the 1922 Seanad (born 1873).
- 19 July – John Cassidy, sculptor and painter (born 1860).
- 20 August – Edward Bulfin, British general during World War I (born 1862).
- 8 September – Maurice George Moore, soldier and independent member of the 1922 Seanad (born 1854).
- 15 September – William MacCarthy-Morrogh, cricketer (born 1870).
- 20 September – Andrew Claude de la Cherois Crommelin, astronomer (born 1865).
- 10 November – Charlotte Despard, suffragist, novelist and Sinn Féin activist (born 1844).
- 14 December – Samuel Lombard Brown, independent member of 1922 Seanad and barrister (born 1858).
