= Nick Nicholls (painter) =

English-born Irish painter and poet (1912–1965)

- Born: Ernest Winston Nicholls; 19 December 1914; Salisbury, Wiltshire, UKGBI
- Died: 8 February 1991 (aged 76); London, UK
- Education: Royal Polytechnic Institution, 1935
- Movement: The White Stag Group
- Spouse: Ann Miller (m. 1947)
- Partner: Georgette Rondel (c. 1941–1942)

Ernest Winston Nicholls (1914–1991), known as Nick Nicholls, was an English-born Irish painter and poet. An early member of The White Stag Group, during the Second World War Nicholls lived in Dublin.

== Early life and education ==
Ernest Winston Nicholls was born on 19 December 1914 to Edward Alfred Nicholls, a Captain and later Colonel, and Constance Gwendoline Nicholls. Nicholls's father was English whilst his mother was born in Wexford.

In 1935, Nicholls qualified as a quantity surveyor from the Royal Polytechnic Institution.

== Career ==
The same year Nicholls began painting. Initially starting with watercolour, Nicholls quickly embraced abstraction and surrealism. Nicholls began frequenting the studio of Basil Rákóczi, the headquarters of The White Stag Group, alongside Georgette Rondel and her husband Percy René Buhler, a German linguist and salesman. During 1937 to 1938, Nicholls, Rondel and Buhler and travelled across Sweden.

Upon returning to London, Nicholls acquired a studio on the same street as Rákóczi. During this period Nicholls exhibited at the Spectrum Gallery. In June 1939, Rondel, Nicholls and Buhler relocated to Dublin. On 16 April 1940, Nicholls' work was shown at the first The White Stag Group exhibition. According to follow White Stag Group member Patrick Scott, Rondel and Nicholls only began a romantic relationship following her husband's deportation in late 1941. By the end of 1941, Rondel returned to London but later died on 4 May 1942. Nicholls' 1942 poem "My Love is Dead" is dedicated to Rondel. The same year Nicholls published his first book of poetry.

=== Post-war ===
In 1946, Nicholls had a religious conversion and returned to London late that year. Around 1953, Nicholls gave up painting and began studying religion and philosophy. In the early 1960s, Nicholls began to painting again.

== Personal life ==
In 1947, Nicholls married Ann Miller in Westminster. He died on 8 February 1991, in London, aged 76.
