= Dairine Vanston =

Irish landscape artist

- Born: Doreen Vanston; 19 October 1903; Dublin, Ireland
- Died: 12 July 1988 (aged 84); Enniskerry, County Wicklow
- Education: Goldsmiths College, London
- Style: Cubism, abstract

Doreen or Dairine Vanston (19 October 1903 – 12 July 1988) was an Irish landscape artist who worked in a Cubist style.

== Early life and education ==
Dairine Vanston was born in Dublin on 19 October 1903. She was the daughter of solicitor John S. B. Vanston, and sculptor Lilla Vanston (née Coffey). Vanston attended Alexandra College, going on to study at Goldsmiths College, London under Roger Bissière. She then went to Paris to the Académie Ranson, being sent there following the advice of Paul Henry. Whilst still in Paris she met Guillermo Padilla, a Costa Rican law student at the University of Paris. They married in 1926 and she took the name Vanston de Padilla. The couple lived for a time in Italy, before moving to San José, Costa Rica. The marriage broke down in the early 1930s, at which point Vanston returned to Paris with her son and studied with André Lhote. She was living in France at the outbreak of World War II with Jankel Adler, but was able to escape to London in 1940, and later to Dublin.

== Artistic career ==
Her time in Paris left a lasting impression on Vanston's work, including the use of primary colours and a strong Cubist influence. Vanston belonged to what the critic Brian Fallon the "Franco-Irish generation of painters who looked to Paris", along with Mainie Jellett, Evie Hone, and Norah McGuinness. Her time spent living in Costa Rica in the late 1920s and early 1930s imbued her work with tropical and highly toned colours. In Dublin in 1935, Vanston exhibited 17 paintings, largely Costa Rican landscapes, at Daniel Egan's gallery on St Stephen's Green. This was the closest thing to a solo show Vanston would mount, with this show also featuring Grace Henry, Cecil ffrench Salkeld, and Edward Gribbon.

Meeting the English artist Basil Rakoczi, who was also living in Dublin during World War II, led her to become associated with The White Stag group. In November 1941, Vanston exhibited for the first time at a group show with 24 other artists, including Patrick Scott. One work that was shown at this exhibition was the painting Keel dance hall, which demonstrated that she spent time in the west of Ireland. The most important event staged by the group was the Exhibition of subjective art, which took place at 6 Lower Baggot St. in January 1944. The Dublin Magazine noted Vanston's work at this show as the most effective of the experimental vanguard. This work, Dying animal, was a Cubist work with semi-representation forms rendered in bold colours. In 1945, her work was featured in a White Stag exhibition in London of young Irish painters at the Arcade Gallery, Old Bond St.

In 1947, Vanston spent almost a year in Costa Rica where she painted primarily in watercolours. Apart from this period, she lived and worked in Dublin, living at 3 Mount Street Crescent near St Stephen's Church. At the inaugural Irish Exhibition of Living Art in 1943, Vanston exhibited five works. At the first Exhibition of Independent Artists in 1960, of which Vanston was a founder, she exhibited three landscapes and a work entitled War. She largely exhibited with the Independent Artists, the Irish Exhibition of Living Art, and the Oireachtas, and did not exhibit with the Royal Hibernian Academy. Later in life, she exhibited with the Figurative Image exhibitions in Dublin and was amongst the first painters chosen for Aosdána. A number of Vanston's works were featured in the 1987 exhibition, Irish women artists, from the eighteenth century to the present arranged by the National Gallery of Ireland and The Douglas Hyde Gallery.

== Later life and legacy ==
Vanston died on 12 July 1988 in a nursing home in Enniskerry, County Wicklow. Her work is greatly admired but has received little by way of critical attention, which may have had to do with her slow rate of output. A number of her works have proved difficult to trace. Vanston was a private person, even refusing to cooperate with the Taylor galleries in the 1980s when they wanted to mount a retrospective of her work. The National Self-Portrait Collection in Limerick holds a work by Vanston.
