= Bilbo =

Bilbo can refer to:

- Bilbo Baggins, protagonist of The Hobbit by J.R.R. Tolkien
- Bilbo's Last Song (at the Grey Havens), a poem by J.R.R. Tolkien
- Bilbo, the Basque name for Bilbao, the major city in the Basque Country of northern Spain
- Bilboes, iron restraints placed on a person's ankles or wrists
- Bilbo (sword), a type of sword thought to be named after the Spanish city
- Bilbo (band), Scottish band

== People ==
- Damarius Bilbo (born 1982), American football player
- Jack Bilbo (1907–1967), European writer, art gallery owner, and artist
- Theodore G. Bilbo (1877–1947), white supremacist Governor of and Senator from Mississippi
- William Bilbo (ca. 1815–1877), attorney, journalist, and entrepreneur who lobbied for passage of the Thirteenth Amendment to the United States Constitution
- Nickname of Robert Walker (musician) (1937–2017), blues musician
- Nickname of Ernest Berger, drummer for Heatwave (band)

== Other ==
- 2991 Bilbo, an asteroid
- Bilbo, the UK's first fully qualified canine lifeguard or 'lifedog'
- Bilbo, the name Fionn Regan used for an early album
- BILBO (Birth before 29 weeks: interventions leading to better outcomes for mothers and babies), a project of the Canadian Perinatal Network
