= Georgette Rondel =

French painter, commercial artist and graphic designer (1918–1942)

- Born: Georgette Marthe France Rondel; 22 December 1918; Vincennes, Val-de-Marne, France
- Died: 4 May 1942 (aged 23); Camberwell, London, UK
- Other name: Zette Rondel
- Occupations: Painter; commercial artist; graphic designer
- Movement: The White Stag Group
- Spouse: Percy René Buhler
- Partner: Nick Nicholls (c. 1941)

Georgette Marthe France Buhler (née Rondel; 22 December 1918 – 4 May 1942), known as Georgette Rondel and Zette Rondel, was a French painter, commercial artist, graphic designer and member of The White Stag Group.

== Early life ==
Georgette Marthe France Rondel was born on 22 December 1918 (Note: Also cited as c. 1915.) in Vincennes to Louis Georges Paul Rondel and Marthe Eugènie Voisin. Rondel studied painting in Paris before working as a commercial artist and graphic designer.

== Artistic career ==
In the mid-1930s, Rondel settled in London where she began painting in an abstract style. Rondel was married to Percy René Buhler, a German linguist and salesman. Rondel, Buhler and Nick Nicholls, an English-born Irish painter and poet, regularly visited the studio of Basil Rákóczi, the headquarters of The White Stag Group. During 1937 to 1938, Rondel, Buhler and Nicholls travelled across Sweden.

In June 1939, Rondel, Nicholls and Buhler relocated to Dublin. Between 1939 and 1940, Rondel began painting in a more representational style. On 16 April 1940, Rondel's work was shown at the first The White Stag Group exhibition. In Dublin, Rondel worked as a commercial artist, exhibited at Victor Waddington Galleries and continued to exhibit with The White Stag Group.

In late 1941, Rondel's husband was deported from Ireland. According to fellow White Stag Group member Patrick Scott, Rondel and Nicholls only began a romantic relationship following Buhler's deportation.

By the end of 1941, Rondel had returned to London whilst Nicholls remained in Dublin. On 4 May 1942 Rondel died in Camberwell, London, aged 23. Rondel's death is typically cited (Note: Patrick Scott cites her death as being from kidney failure, whilst Joan de Frenay cites her death as being a suicide.) as being from an undisclosed illness.

Nicholls' 1942 poem "My Love is Dead" is dedicated to Rondel.
