= Gladwell (surname) =

Gladwell is an English surname. Notable people with the surname include:

- David Gladwell (born 1935), British film editor and director
- Malcolm Gladwell (born 1963), Canadian writer
- Nathan Gladwell (fl. 2000s), British actor
- Robbie Gladwell, British rock and blues guitarist
- Rodney Gladwell (1928–1979), British artist
- Shaun Gladwell (born 1972), Australian contemporary artist
