= David Gommon =

British painter (1913–1987)

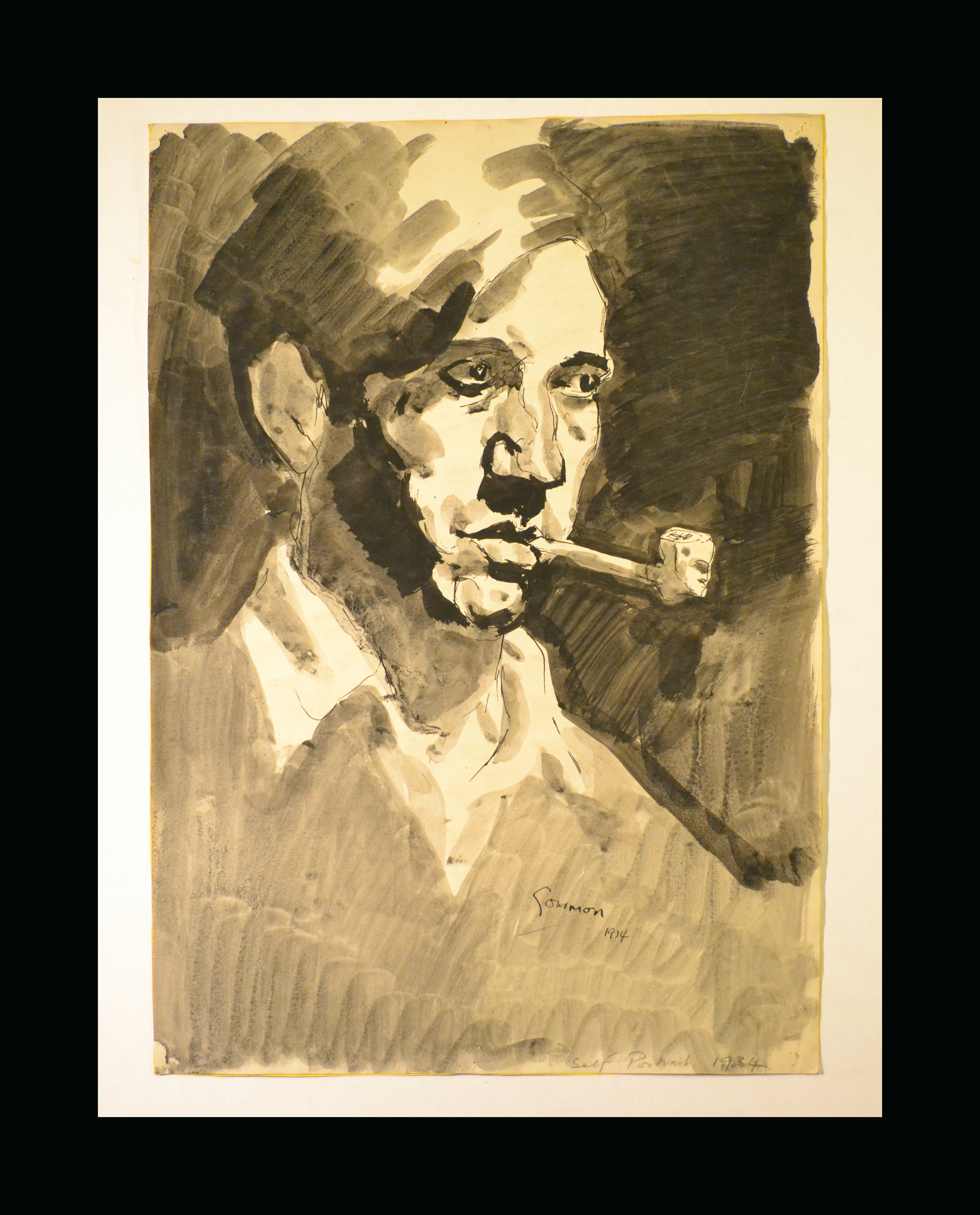
- Self portrait, Circa 1932
- Born: 12 December 1913; Battersea, London
- Died: 20 January 1987 (aged 73); Northampton
- Known for: painter

David Gommon (12 December 1913 – 20 January 1987) was a British painter born in Battersea, South London.

== Early life and education ==
David Gommon was born on 12 December 1913 in Battersea in South London. His father was a Londoner, a journeyman carpenter. At the age of 16 he was enrolled in Battersea Polytechnic and the Clapham School of Art. He was able to visit art galleries of the Netherlands to study the paintings of the great masters. He met art collector, Lucy Carrington Wertheim and, when he was 18-19, she became his patron paying £2 a week for his work.

== Career ==
It was through Lucy Wertheim that he held his first one-man show at her gallery in Burlington Gardens, and attracted positive critical attention. During this time he met many other patrons of the arts, and he painted the young dancer's Margot Fonteyn and Robert Helpmann at Saddlers Wells. He was part of the 20s group supported by Lucy Wertheim that included Christopher Wood, Barbara Hepworth, Roger Hilton, Robert Medley, Phelan Gibb, David Burton, Humphrey Slater and Victor Pasmore.

In his own work, he gradually focussed on the essence of the English and Welsh landscapes. In 1938, he stopped painting and produced his Book of the Dead cartoon series. He started painting again in 1944.

== Teaching ==
His first teaching job at Northampton Grammar School where he worked and taught pupils, including actor/artist Jonathan Adams, of whom he completed a portrait. While here he painted until he retired. He would often paint reproductions of famous paintings to illustrate his lessons; the sets for the school's regular theatrical productions would be designed, painted and constructed in his art room.

In the 1960s he delivered WEA Lectures on Art for a number of years, in Northampton and the county. His last commission, the two large murals at St. Crispin's hospital, Northampton, arose from this conviction.

== Personal life ==
During the Second World War his spinal curvature rendered him unfit for military service, he served in the London Auxiliary fire service. During the war, he had met and married Jean Vipond. He died in 1987.

== Reviews ==
Art critic Ian Mayes summed up this aspect of his work in his review of his 1975 exhibition at St Catharine's College, Cambridge:

“I know of few artists whose work communicates such a sense of joy in life as that which comes from these beautifully quiet, very modest and English paintings, so accurate in their evocation of the changing moods and feeling of nature. The landscapes (which together with the related paintings of enclosed gardens and cricket matches I consider to be his finest work) show that in his use of colour and simplified shapes he has found a personal and eloquent language, perfectly suited to its purpose; and an important part of that purpose is the expression of wonderment and delight in nature.”

== Exhibitions ==
His work forms part of the permanent collections at;

- Salford City Art Gallery;
- Whitworth Art Gallery; Manchester, England;
- Northampton Art Gallery;
- The University of Leicester;
- Auckland Art Gallery, New Zealand;
- Queensland Art Gallery, Brisbane, Australia;
- Barbados City Art Gallery;
- The Chapel of Canberra Grammar School, Australia.

Exhibitions have also been shown at:-

- Northampton Art Gallery;
- The House of Commons;
- The Herbert Gallery, Coventry;
- Kettering Art Gallery;
- Luton Museum and Art Gallery;
- Michael Jones Jewellers, Northampton;
- Burton-on -Trent Art Gallery;
- Gainsborough's House, Sudbury;
- Stafford Art Gallery;
- South London Art Gallery-Camberwell;
- The Paris Salon, 1979;
- The Liverpool School of Architecture;
- The University Centre, Northampton;
- Vaughan College, Leicester;
- St Catharine's College, Cambridge;
- The Fairfield Halls, Croydon;
- Durham City Art Gallery;
- The Angel Row Gallery, Nottingham;
- St Crispin Hospital, Northampton-Creation Mural and Shopping Mural;
- St Saviours Parish Church, Oxton - Arts festival;
- The Williamson Art Gallery, Birkenhead.

== Bibliography ==
- Wertheim, Lucy (1947)Adventure In Art, Nicholson and Watson, London, P48. ISBN 1871360021
- Hoskin, Sarah and Haggard, Liz (1999) Healing the Hospital Environment, Taylor Francis, P62-63. ISBN 3639328698
- Philip Vann with Karen Taylor, (2025) David Gommon, Sansom and Company, P140. ISBN 978-1-91140-63-5
