= The White Stag Group =

Artistic group (1935-)

The White Stag Group was an London-founded Irish artist group centred around the British artists Basil Rákóczi and Kenneth Hall. Founded in 1935, the group moved to Ireland in 1939 and was described as "an Irish phenomenon" by Irish art historian S.B. Kennedy.

== History ==
The White Stag Group was founded in London in 1935 by the artists Basil Rákóczi and Kenneth Hall, with the aim of promoting the advancement of subjectivity in psychological analysis and art. Rákóczi and Hall had met at a meeting of the Society for Creative Psychology in July 1935. The Society was co-founded by Rákóczi and Herbrand Ingouville-Williams in May 1935 with the aim to develop the techniques of Freudian psychological analysis.

The White Stage was headquartered at Rákóczi's art studio at 8 Fitzroy Street, Fitzrovia. The group's emblem, a white stag on a dark background, was the emblem of Ingouville-Williams' family and was a personal symbol of Rákóczi. The group was joined by Juan Stoll, Enid Mountfort and Elizabeth Ormsby.

== Ireland ==
The group moved to Ireland in 1939 and stayed until after the Second World War where they gained Irish members like Thurloe Conolly, Paul Egestorff, Stephen Gilbert and Patrick Scott. Their group philosophy, which they called Subjectivist Art, was not associated with any particular style or set belief. Instead, it encouraged an exploration of psychology and of modernist ideas. They also believed in aesthetic experimentation and aesthetics as an objective in art.

The group was at the vanguard of modern artistic ideas in Ireland, were involved in the Irish Exhibition of Living Art and influenced Patrick Scott, Gerald Dillon and Louis le Brocquy. The Irish composer Brian Boydell, at that time a visual artist, was also a member of the group.

=== Legacy ===
The Irish Museum of Modern Art put on a White Stag retrospective during the summer of 2005.

== Members ==
- Dorothy Blackham
- Brian Boydell
- Jocelyn Chewett
- Thurloe Conolly
- Ralph Cusack
- Robert (Bobby) Dawson, member 1940–1941
- Hertha Phyllis Eason
- Paul Egestorff
- Phelan Gibb
- Stephen Gilbert
- David Gommon
- Kenneth Hall
- Phyllis Hayward, joined 1941
- Mainie Jellett
- Eugene Judge
- Enid Mountfort
- Nick Nicholls
- Elizabeth Ormsby
- Basil Rákóczi
- Georgette Rondel
- Patrick Scott
- Juan Stoll
- Dairine Vanston
- Patricia Wallace

=== Associated ===
- Helmut Kolle
- Noel Moffett
- Margot Moffett
