= Stephen Gilbert =

British avant-garde painter and sculptor

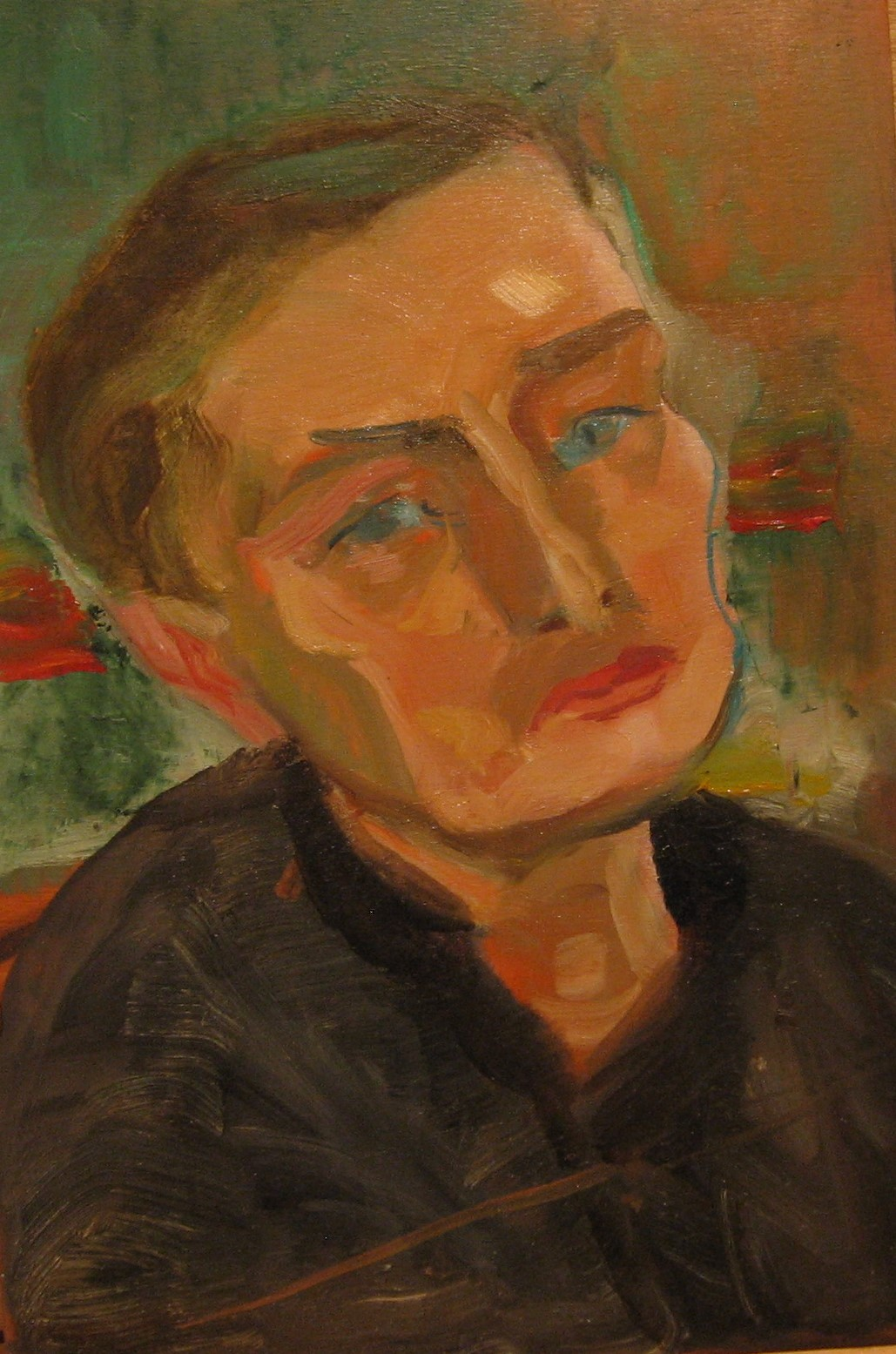
- Evelyn Marc (1950s), "Portrait of Stephen Gilbert"
- Born: 15 January 1910; Wormit, Fife, Scotland, UKGBI
- Died: 12 January 2007 (aged 96); Somerset, England, UK
- Education: Slade School of Fine Art, 1932
- Occupations: Painter; sculptor; architectural designer
- Style: Avant-garde; abstract
- Movement: The White Stag Group; COBRA; Groupe Espace; Néovision
- Spouse: Jocelyn Chewett (m. 1935; died 1979)
- Children: 2
- Relatives: Sir Alfred Gilbert (grandfather); Peter F. C. Gilbert (nephew)

Stephen Gilbert (15 January 1910 – 12 January 2007) was a British painter, sculptor and architectural designer active in Paris. During the Second World War Gilbert and his wife lived in Dublin and were members of The White Stag Group. A representative of the post-war Parisian avant-garde, Gilbert was a member of COBRA art movement.

== Early years and education ==
Gilbert was born in the village of Wormit, Fife to English parents Francis Gordon William Gilbert, a Commander in the Royal Navy, and Cicely Gilbert (née Kellett). Gilbert was the paternal grandson of Sir Alfred Gilbert, a sculptor, and was the uncle of Peter F. C. Gilbert, a neuroscientist and biophysicist.

He studied architecture at the Slade School of Art in London from 1929 to 1932, where he befriended fellow student Roger Hilton. Gilbert won the Slade Scholarship at the end of his first year, and the principal Sir Henry Tonks encouraged him to start painting from 1930. He also met sculptor Jocelyn Chewett at the Slade.

== Career ==
He exhibited at the Royal Academy in 1936, and put on an early solo show in London, at the Wertheim Gallery in 1938. He moved to Paris in 1937, where his wife studied under Ossip Zadkine, leaving before the Second World War. He failed a medical for military service, and he spent the war in Ireland near Dublin with his wife and son, Humphrey. He joined The White Stag group of refugee artists. His work was inspired by Masson, and by reading Jung, Nietzsche and Jakob Böhme, with fantastic creatures and plants painted in vivid colours.

He returned to Paris in 1946, after the birth of his daughter Frances. He exhibited at the Salon des Surindépendents in Paris in 1948, attracting the attention of Danish artist Asger Jorn, and leading to his membership of the CoBrA avant-garde art group. He was one of only two British members, the other being William Gear. He was included in the first issue of the group's journal and participated in both major exhibitions: the Bregnerød congress in August 1949, where he worked on the collective mural, and the Amsterdam exhibition at the Stedelijk Museum in November of that year, where he worked with Constant Nieuwenhuys. A French art critic described him as "le plus français des sculpteurs anglais et l'un des plus européens parmi les artistes" ("the most French of British sculptors and one of the most European of artists").

He also visited Max Walter Svanberg in Sweden. After his contact with CoBrA, his approach to painting became more abstract, but he remained in contact with Pierre Alechinsky after CoBrA dissolved. He exhibited several times at the Salon des Réalités Nouvelles.

During the 1950s, he concentrated on three-dimensional and architectural forms, formed from sheets of aluminium. He joined André Bloc's Groupe Espace in 1954, exhibiting at the Salon de la Jeune Sculpture. He was also a founder of the Néovision group, and worked with experimental architect Peter Stead. He moved on to more curvilinear forms, exhibited at the Drian Galleries in London in 1961, and completed two public commissions in London. He received a Gulbenkian award in 1962, and the sculpture prize at the Tokyo Biennale in 1965.

Following Jocelyn Chewett's death in 1979, his sculpture moved on from open forms to more enclosed structures. He returned to painting in the 1980s. Examples of his work are held by public collections, including KUNSTEN Museum of Modern Art Aalborg, Stedelijk Museum Amsterdam, Calouste Gulbenkian Museum and Tate Museum.

== Personal life ==
In 1935, Gilbert married Jocelyn Chewett with whom he had two children. He died 12 January 2007 in Somerset, aged 96.
