= Jonathan Adams (British actor) =

English actor (1931–2005)

- as the Narrator in The Rocky Horror Show (photo: Joe Gaffney)
- Born: John Adams; 14 February 1931; Northampton, Northamptonshire, England
- Died: 13 June 2005 (aged 74); London, England
- Occupations: Actor; artist
- Spouse: Julia Vezza (m. 1969; div. 1976)

Jonathan Adams (14 February 1931 – 13 June 2005) was an English television, film and theatre actor. He was also a visual artist whose works were exhibited throughout his life.

== Biography ==
Born John Adams in Northampton, he trained as an artist at Northampton Art College and Chelsea College of Art. He became an actor in 1959, changing his name to Jonathan Adams, but continued working as an artist. He was especially known for his surrealist cartoons and collages. His work has been exhibited at a wide range of venues including London University's Dixon Gallery, the Barbican Centre, Northampton Museum and Art Gallery, the South London Gallery and the Chelmsford Arts Festival (where in 1996 he was Resident Artist). His final exhibition, "Jonathan Adams in Wonderland," opened at the Riverside Studios in London, the April before his death.

As an actor, Adams is best known for his role as the Narrator in the original 1973 London production of The Rocky Horror Show, and is featured on the original cast soundtrack. He is also well known for portraying Dr. Everett Von Scott in the 1975 film version of The Rocky Horror Picture Show.

He played a number of roles in British theatre, TV and film, including work with The Actor's Company and at the Old Vic. On television, he played Adam the shepherd in the TV mini-series Jesus of Nazareth (1977), and Reverend Quiverful in the BBC serial The Barchester Chronicles (1982). In the TV serial The Adventures of Sherlock Holmes, he played Jonas Oldacre in "The Norwood Builder" episode (1985) and Carter in the Miss Marple episode "Nemesis" (1987). He also played Professor Marriott in the 1986–88 sitcom Yes, Prime Minister. He appeared in British comedy films such as Eskimo Nell (1975), Three for All (1975), It Could Happen to You (1975), Adventures of a Private Eye (1977) and Adventures of a Plumber's Mate (1978).

In 1993 he played Inspector Lejeune in The Pale Horse, a BBC Radio 4 adaptation of the novel by Agatha Christie. It was specially adapted to mark the 50th anniversary of the Saturday Night Theatre strand. Adams was also a member of the London cast of Tom Foolery.

Adams died in London, England, of a stroke at the age of 74. A portrait of Adams by British artist David Gommon is displayed on the BBC Paintings online gallery.

== Filmography ==
- The Assassination Bureau (1969) - French President (uncredited)
- Eskimo Nell (1975) - Lord Coltwind
- Three for All (1975) - Dr. Sparks
- The Rocky Horror Picture Show (1975) - Dr. Everett V. Scott
- It Could Happen to You (1975) - Henry VIII
- Adventures of a Private Eye (1977) - Inspector Hogg
- Jesus of Nazareth (1977) - Adam
- Adventures of a Plumber's Mate (1978) - Rent Collector
- Revolution (1985) - Chaplain
- Two Evil Eyes (1990) - Hammer (segment "The Facts in the Case of Mr. Valdemar")
