= Thomas Cullen Young =

Scottish Presbyterian anthropologist and missionary

- Born: 27 October 1880; Edinburgh, Scotland, UKGBI
- Died: 14 June 1955 (aged 74); Edinburgh, Scotland, UK
- Occupations: Missionary; anthropologist
- Notable work: Notes on the history of the Tumbuka-Kamanga peoples in the Northern Province of Nyasaland (1970)
- Spouse: Jessie Young (m. 1908; died 1954)
- Children: 2
- Relatives: Noel Moffett (ex-son-in-law)

Thomas Cullen Young (27 October 1880 – 14 June 1955) was a Scottish Presbyterian anthropologist and missionary, who first started his missionary work in Malawi at the Livingstonia Mission in 1904. During his missionary career, he emphasised learning the customs and wisdom of the local population to contribute towards a greater understanding of missionary work, as well as the importance of consideration of the African lifestyle.

He was influential in education, religion, and social aspects, eventually helping relieve tensions between anthropologists and missionaries residing in the region. Cullen Young had a broad range of interests, having passion in missionary work, but also education, ethnography, anthropology, and politics. The broader concerns with African culture included in his writing had political implications in both the pre- and post-independence eras. Later in his life, he developed an interest in African language, culture, and history, writing prolifically on these subjects. Young's studies on the Tumbuka-Kamanga peoples provided the first published record of the ethnography and history of northern Malawi. He also had a friendship with Hastings Kamuzu Banda, who became the first President of Malawi. Young is perceived as an important documentalist on this particular period of missionary history.

Young went to Britain to work as a second-rank colonial expert in 1931 and died in 1955 at the age of 74.

== Early life and education ==
Young was born on 27 October 1880 in Edinburgh, Scotland. He was named after his father's maternal grandmother. He was also the eldest child of the family, and had a non-identical brother named John. His family later expanded to include four other brothers and one sister.

His father was the John Young. At the time of Thomas Young's birth, his father was serving as minister of Newington United Presbyterian Church in Edinburgh. The Youngs were strict disciplinarians at home, and informal pressure to follow the same occupation would have been considerable.

Young's ancestors were linked to the Borders. Young, as expressed in his writings, was interested in the significance of boundaries between different cultures from a young age.

His family was regularly and steadfastly involved in church and municipal interests. Young was therefore bred in the Protestant Christian faith from a young age, with his family instilling religious values in him from childhood. It is supposed that he gained his later evangelical ambitions through these teachings from his upbringing in early life.

Young first attended school in Edinburgh, then moved to Glasgow, starting attendance at the Glasgow Academy in 1891. All the boys in his family received the same school education. His school teachings involved classical subjects, but had a more modernised emphasis in comparison to other schools in the region. Young participated actively in sports and continued sporting links with the academy even after leaving the school. In 1899, Young began an apprenticeship with the firm of Moores, Carson, and Watson to become a charted accountant.

== Missionary career ==
Young began his journey to Malawi to officially begin his missionary work in 1904 for the Livingstonia Mission while the region was under British colonial rule.

While engaging in missionary work, Young possessed concern that African societies should be viewed on their own terms rather than through a Western lens, which was an unusual perception for missionaries during his period of time. He demonstrated respect for African culture and traditions by translating stories written in the African language for publication in England and other countries, and was passionate about communicating the stories of the African people to other cultures.

It is suggested that although Young gained an inside view of Malawi to a certain degree, being open to local customs and respectful of the native people, he still retained his point of view as a foreign missionary. However, he most likely gained more of an insider view than other missionaries of his time, due to his exceptional respect and interest for African culture.

=== Relationship with Hastings Banda ===
While Banda was studying in Edinburgh with the Royal College of Physicians and the Royal College of Surgeons, and while Young was a missionary in Malawi, Young managed to start and sustain a long-term friendship with Hastings Kamuzu Banda, who would later become the first President of Malawi. Banda was well acquainted with many missionaries but was not exceptionally enthusiastic about all of them. Young's appreciation of the African ways and lifestyle seemed to capture Banda's attention, and the pair started a friendship. At certain times, they both displayed an idealised sense of tradition in which the ordinary villager gained favour rather than the educated elite, which may have influenced Banda's later political views and style of leadership. In a formal letter of recommendation, Young referred to Banda as "a very sound fellow of good judgment and character."

Young's attempt to codify African tradition as an anthropologist missionary can be seen to have played a part in Kamuzu Banda's dictatorial style of rule and, as a result, the eventual authoritative nature of the Malawian political system. There is also evidence that Banda and Young's relationship may have led to subsequent collaborative work within the Malawian community, such as editing the collection of stories, Our African way of life, in 1946.

Young's previous records and writing also display some association with Clements Kadalie, the pioneer of black trade unionism in South Africa, although it is not made clear the extent of their relationship.

=== Views on education and colonialism ===
Although he did engage in work relating to education and encouraged authorship of African literature, Young did not have a strong belief that education would be a key contribution to African advancement. Similar to many other missionaries during this time period, he remained ambivalent and unsure about the value of higher education for the African people.

Furthermore, Young's vernacular interest did not lead him to support nationalism. He "favoured independence when ready" but was also highly disapproving of the Federation of Rhodesia and Nyasaland, clearly aiming to criticise within his writings. Young demonstrates evidence of thought that the British Empire was associated with noble virtues, and cannot be seen as a polemical anti-colonist, but can rather be viewed as a gradualist. However, his life's work led to a re-evaluation of the consideration of missionary work as an essential aspect of colonialism, because while he maintained his position as a missionary and not a native, he did manage to contribute to the shaping of modern Africa as a crucial pioneer of translation through his writing contributions.

== Anthropology work ==
Although Young did not receive any formal training as an anthropologist, he had anthropological ambitions and is most recognised for his anthropology work rather than as a missionary. His publication, Notes on the history of the Tumbuka-Kamanga peoples in the Northern Province of Nyasaland, in 1970 provided the first published record of the ethnography and history of northern Malawi. Therefore, these writings truly show why he is perceived as an important documentalist on this particular period of missionary history.

Young was chosen as an editor for a writing competition organised by the International African Institute to encourage authorship about African culture. His writings were published in a collection called Our African way of life, and described the typical everyday occurrences in the life of the tribe and the family within African society. These essays also described traditional customs such as rituals and marriage traditions. Young collaborated with Hastings Banda to finish editorial work for this publication.

He was also a contributor and translator for a collection of short, narrative fiction stories based on African culture, entitled African new writing; short stories by African authors, which was published in Great Britain in 1947. This book has been called the first collection of modern African prose fiction in English, and contains 14 short stories written by seven African authors which were edited by Cullen Young. Some of the stories are told in a fairy-tale sort of style, and served to raise awareness about African culture in European countries.

Young also sponsored publications of vernacular literature in an effort to promote African cultural understanding and acceptance.

Young's comprehensive notes on the customs and folklore of the Tumbaka were chosen for publication in 1931. These writings show his desire to learn more knowledge and wisdom from the African people, and to further understand the people he is serving as a missionary.

Young also published a guide to anthropology for missionaries in Africa for beginner-level anthropologists in 1940. Some concepts include African ancestor worship, and other important aspects of the culture that Young presumed helpful for a missionary to know.

Young was also particularly interested in the African language, and sought to master it while doing missionary work.

In Britain from 1931 to 1955, Young served as a second rank colonial expert who provided his views on African culture and relations, in the midst of a period of decaying colonialism.

== Mediation of tensions between anthropologists and missionaries ==
T. Cullen Young is often viewed as an unusual exception to the antagonism between missionaries and anthropologists, and the Disruption of 1843 within the Scottish Presbyterian faith. He often acted as the common ground between the interests of anthropology and missionary work, doing translating and mediation work throughout his lifetime.

The period in which Young worked was one in which there were heightened tensions in the relationship between anthropologists and missionaries. Despite this tension, Young continued to work both as a missionary and an anthropologist, providing the slim intersection of spheres between the anthropological field and the missionary field, which demonstrates his bravery and uncommon interdisciplinary mindset.

== Personal life ==
On 24 June 1908, Young married Jessie Fiddes (1876–1954), a medical missionary, in Aberdeen. The couple had two children including Margot Moffett (née Young), a member of The White Stag Group. Through his daughter Margot, Young was the former son-in-law of the Irish architect and educator Noel Moffett.

On 14 June 1955, Young died in Edinburgh aged 74.

== Legacy ==
Young's recordings of the Tumbaka people provided the first ever published record of the history and ethnography of the northern Malawi region. As one of the first to publish such historical records, he was a pioneer in his field. Young's vision for the future of African literature and historical conservation is especially crucial and novel, because this viewpoint was extremely rare in missionaries during this contextual period of time. His writings about the occurrences within northern Malawi showcase a talented historian who maintains a conservative missionary perspective.

However, this contribution may be viewed with a critical approach, as Young's dependence for data on multiple informants could be seen as invalid because many of his informants were educated and living outside of their own environment. Whereas Young generally succeeded in retaining his objective point of view within the restrictions of the procedures of his time, his missionary and ultimately outsider perspective could have easily contributed bias and blurred his vision.

Young's historical reports also brought up important social, political and historical issues. His writing challenged the common Western perspective on Africa as victims in need of rescue and targets of colonialism. He sought for Africa to be considered on its own grounds, and not only through the judgment and analysis of the West.

Overall, there is evidence that Young was an influential missionary whose work impacted many in the nation. The most important part of his legacy is likely his influence on the development modern Africa, his historical recordings of the Tumbaka people, and his impact on the future first President of Malawi, Hastings Banda.
