= Peter Stead =

Peter Stead may refer to:

- Peter Stead (architect) (1922–1999), English architect
- Peter Stead (cricketer) (1930–2023), Canadian cricketer
- Peter Stead (writer) (1943–2026), Welsh writer and broadcaster
