= Henry Stockley =

- Born: 1892; Eynsford, Kent, England
- Died: 1982 (aged 89–90); Dartford, Kent, England
- Citizenship: British
- Education: Bus driver
- Known for: Primitive
- Notable work: On Royston Heath, London Embankment, Blackwall, In theWoods, This England
- Patrons: Lucy Wertheim, Jack Bilbo

Henry "Busdriver" Stockley (1892 – 1982) was an English primitive artist. Once called "the greatest inspired painter since William Blake", Henry Stockley was arguably the most important primitive artist active in the period 1930 to 1960. Alan Clutton-Brock, art critic of The Times, was particularly impressed by his handling of figures and his ability "to give its proper atmosphere to a landscape and keep a number of curious and unexpected colours in harmony with each other". Stockley's work suffered years of neglect partially reversed with the publication of a number of articles on his life and artistic production and with a major exhibition devoted to his life and art at the London Transport Museum (July 1996 to March 1997). The location is significant. Although trained as a meat inspector, for many years Henry Stockley was a bus driver.

== Early life ==
Henry Stockley was born in 1892 at 10 Willow Terrace, Eynsford, Kent, the third son of ten children. William and Frances Stockley had eight boys and two girls. William Stockley was a sign writer, specialising in gold leaf and a plumber. The terrace and the interior of the Stockley house were recorded in the Channel 4 documentary on Eynsford, where we are shown one of his younger sisters, Florence Martin, at the very end of her life. Florence described life in the cottage in those early days:

We got our water from a well, one well between six cottages, our only lights were oil lamps and candles, no street lamps of course, but how bright the stars seemed to be. The WC was a little walk from the house, so one had a candle in a Jam jar to light one. Three lavs between six houses! just dirt ones at first...Our father was a master plumber but owing to ill health wasn't always able to work, so Mum did needlework, sometimes took in washing to make ends meet! ... The road through the village was just a dirt road, very dusty, then they started to tar them ... The only traffic was horses & carts, & if one had a bicycle one was very well off... Opposite our cottage was a stack yard where the corn was stacked ready for thrashing. Dolling had a thrashing machine, & once a year used to thrash the corn from the stacks... [Florence Martin, unpublished manuscript]

The villages and landscape of North Kent, the landscape of Samuel Palmer, form an important element in Stockley's visual memory. Two of his brothers died in infancy, and one in an accident in his early twenties. The latter's death had a significant influence on Stockley as an artist.

Stockley started school in a room at the Manse, High Street, Eynsford and then moved to the village school. He left school at thirteen, and started work in a slaughterhouse at the village butchers [Pockocks, Eynsford] and at an early age moved to Farnham, Surrey, where he worked in a slaughterhouse attached to T. Stratford, a Farnham Butcher. Stockley claimed in a newspaper interview that he painted slaughter house scenes, but these have not been traced. Stockley played football for Farnham Town, and ran for the Harriers. An interest in his own physical health and prowess stayed with him throughout most of his life. On weekends he cycled from Surrey back to his home in Kent. Stockley later studied at night school and passed exams to be a meat inspector. Apart from his training as a bus driver, which he recalls in his reminiscences, Stockley on the Buses [Walker,1994], this was the limit of his formal education. He was, as he often said, a self-taught man. He read with enthusiasm Dickens, Bunyan and George Borrow. and struck up a relationship with Arthur Mee, the compiler of the Children's Encyclopaedia, whom he used to meet off the train at Eynsford Station. He had his own small butchers shop in Horton Kirby, Kent, for a short time. When the First World War broke out he was directed into Vickers Armstrong at Dartford and drove ammunition all over the country for the duration of the war. He was married during this period.

Like so many, Stockley was deeply affected by World War I, never forgetting the friends in the Kent villages who had died. He was against war and helped his son to avoid military service. The Cenotaph features in a number of his paintings as an exploration of his feelings of loss. After the war he moved to New Cross where he started up a small haulage business, at 80 Vanguard Street: the business failed. Henry always felt himself a little above the ordinary working man, not only because he was an artist. These failed business ventures are indicative of his attempts to move away from being merely a worker. It was after the failure of his business that he applied for work as a bus driver; work was scarce and it was a regular job. He started at Reigate, Surrey and was eventually transferred to Swanley Bus Garage, his base for the rest of his working life on the buses—32 years 11 months, from 1925 to 1957. The company he worked for was called the East Surrey Bus Company and, later, London Transport. He did not enjoy driving buses, hating the long hours, cold, discomfort, eyestrain, poor wages, berating the management and feeling isolated. He drove throughout the Second World War and recorded what he saw in a series of Blitz paintings, two of which survive: Saving St Pauls and London. He moved during the War to Oliver Crescent, Farningham.

His children, Helen the younger daughter, and Henry the only son, have early memories of their father executing a painting. Son Henry remembers going to the village to buy his father paint. In a newspaper article Stockley himself said in 1932, "I have painted since I was a boy on any odd scraps of paper or canvas I found available." In addition to paper and canvas he certainly painted on linoleum, old pillow cases, beaverboard, floor boards, plywood, brown paper, a Rexine chair cover, bits of glass, and wall paper. As a painter, Stockley was completely self-taught: in that he never trained at an art school. He considered this an advantage and was pleased he had never learned perspective. His father had however learned the use of gold leaf, singwriting and leaded lights. It is probable he restored these for Farningham Church. Henry learned how to mix oil paints, his favourite medium, from his father. He claimed he had special formulas for his colours. There is therefore a direct link between the 'popular art' of sign writing and Henry's art. The records of the baptisms of the Stockley family in Farningham, going back to 1819, give the profession of the fathers listed there as 'painter' or 'painter and glazier'. In this respect Stockley's roots as an artist are in accord with the eighteenth and nineteenth century 'naive' artists James Ayres discusses in his excellent English Naive Painting 1750–1900 [Ayres, 1980:15–24]. Some of the paintings are bold and emblematic, some have the rich colours of stained glass: Seen From The Bus uses subtle traces of gold paint subtly to suggest the glamour of evening in London.

Stockley, his daughter recalled, was very outspoken in his views and a man of principle, regarded by his children and grandchildren as kind. He was also well known as man with a keen sense of humour. His cartoons and writings demonstrate this vividly.

After his wife's death, Stockley's behaviour became increasingly eccentric, and he eventually was admitted to Mabledon, a psychiatric hospital in Dartford where he died in 1982. He was buried in Horton Kirby graveyard, with his wife, the grave marked by a simple inscription.

== Henry Stockley – Artist ==
Stockley's work first attracted public interest when he was exhibited in a "one-man show" by Lucy Wertheim at her Gallery in Burlington Gardens. These paintings were principally concerned with scenes from The Pilgrim's Progress; the artist was named as Busdriver' Stockley. Lucy Carrington Wertheim, wife of Paul Wertheim, the Dutch Consul in Manchester, was already interested in naive art, as she called it, and was collecting work by Wallis and Vivin [Hume, 1992; Wertheim, 1947:26]. Her encounter with Henry Stockley is memorably told in her autobiography, Adventure in Art [Wertheim, 1947:37–38]:

When I saw the artist stoop down, collect his paintings and begin to roll them into a bundle again ... I went over to the other end of the gallery to have a word with the man himself. He said he was a bus driver who devoted all his spare moments to painting. He had pinched from his wife some old linen pillow slips and ground his own paint and the results were contained in the bundle! ... He told me he had made the round of every gallery in London and could get no one interested in his paintings. He had made a vow the morning he set out to bring his work to me that he would burn everything on his return home if I too turned down his efforts [Wertheim, 1947:37].

She continued to show Stockley's work in London, Sussex, Manchester, at her gallery in Derbyshire. His work was frequently shown alongside Alfred Wallace and Christopher Wood, but never sold well. It did however receive some critical acclaim. Alan Clutton-Brock, art critic for The Times, reviewed Stockley's work sympathetically in 1932, writing of his use of 'curious and unexpected colours' 'working in harmony to create atmosphere in a landscape', his 'curiously expressive' drawing especially of the human figure, and his originality of invention. The same critic wrote in 1934 of Stockley's 'dramatic and highly original forms'. A Daily Sketch writer compared him with Blake, an association that stayed with him for a number of years. A painting, Evelyn Laye in Hyde Park was shown in The Listener in that same year and this work is now in the Towner Gallery, Eastbourne, and was last exhibited in a travelling show in 1992. The press, with exceptions like the Times, and later the Daily Worker, generally treated Stockley's work either as simple-minded or as yet another deplorable example of the stupidity of 'modern art'. Stockley was deeply hurt by this hostility, especially by a Sunday Times review of 1932 which failed to find any positive qualities and talks of an "evident lack of technical ability" and "unsophisticated imaginings."

In 1938 Stockley's work was shown at the now-famous exhibition of Unprofessional Painting at the Bensham Grove Settlement, Gateshead-On-Tyne alongside the Ashington Group, the so-called Pitmen Painters, which attracted the interest of a number of leading left wing intellectuals of the 1930s [Feaver, 1985:77–79]. Lucy Wertheim contributed seven works by Stockley, a Green Line Bus Driver, two by Alfred Wallace [sic], an ex-sailor and six works by David Burton, a pavement artist.

In the early 1940s, Stockley made the acquaintance of the artist and gallery owner, Jack Bilbo, an event recorded in Bilbo's autobiography:

One day a bus full of people stopped in the middle of the street, and the driver, whom I had never seen before, called to me, "Oi there, Jack, I'm a painter too." The passengers had to wait while he made arrangements to show me his paintings, which incidentally were very good. His name, Henry Stockley. He has had many shows at my gallery and sold quite well [Bilbo, 1948].

Bilbo, at his Modern Art Gallery in King Charles Street, was exhibiting paintings by, for example, Matisse, Renoir, Maurice Utrillo, and Pierre Bonnard. Bilbo did however find space for a Stockley one man show, although the exhibition had to be delayed:

As I am holding a show of Picasso's latest work during August which would rather crowd your paintings, I am postponing your exhibition until September, which, from the point of view of a contemporary artist, is anyhow a better month [Bilbo, letter to Stockley, 13 July 1944].

The show was finally held in November 1944; Stockley's work was hung alongside Picasso and Henri Gaudier-Brzeska.

A small number of Stockley's paintings carry the Modern Art Gallery label. Stockley spoke well of Jack Bilbo, who was said to have sold more of his paintings and at a better price than did Lucy Wertheim. Lucy was hurt that her Christian had deserted her but the hurt was repaired. She corresponded with Stockley for over thirty years, almost up to her death in 1971, encouraging and advising him. She constantly strove to find him more congenial work, to give him a better basis for his painting. A constant theme of the letters is Lucy Wertheim's attempts to meet Stockley, usually in London, to discuss his work, and Stockley wriggling out of seeing her. His wife was jealous and Helen, Stockley's daughter, acted as go-between.

With Bilbo's demise—he was bankrupt, the Halifax repossessed his bungalow and blew up his massive, and awful, sculptures— Henry, at first reluctantly, exhibited through the London Transport Art Show, and the Royal Academy Summer Show. Very few realised the importance of Stockley's work in the 1950s. The Wertheim connection helped to keep his work out of total obscurity. The last London Exhibition was given at the Duncan Campbell gallery in Kensington, in 1987. In 1988 a considerable body of his work was discovered in his daughter's attic. When dusted, it comprised a one man show in Gillingham, Kent, in 1989 [Walker, 1989].

There are a number of possible ways in which to categorise Henry Stockley as a painter: the most obvious categories are naive, or primitive; or possibly as a representative of people's art. The newer category of Outsider Art is only appropriate for his more visionary work. While Stockley, as his letters show, was unsympathetic to most contemporary art, he was certainly seen by collectors in the 1930s and 1940s as a modern artist, even if in a naive mode. Lister and Williams, in their book, British Naive and Primitive Art [1977] regard Stockley as one of the "rare and much to be treasured" primitives along with Wallis and James Dixon. They write of Stockley's "primitive enthusiasm" and "simple naive style". As with so many critics, they were simply unaware of the range and complexity of Stockey's output. Their illustration [Coneys, 1933, as yet untraced] is in dull monochrome: Stockely's dazzling and unusual colours are shown in a dusty grey. As the Times critic noted in 1932, the bus-driver label attempted to associate his work with La Douanier Rousseau, another naive artist whose work was worthy to be shown alongside great masters. Stockely saw himself differently, as a great if unacknowledged artist, a "new old master." His letters only passingly mention other artists, but include scathing comments on Graham Sutherland coupled with his own wish to design work for cathedrals. Stockley was certainly familiar with the National Gallery collection; and some of his work resembles Italian Primitives. He also named one of his houses after Rembrandt, and the house still bears the name. He must also have been familiar with the artists his patron Lucy Wertheim showed: Alfred Wallis, Christopher Wood, Phelan Gibb and Frances Hodgkins for example, and the distinctly "modern" painters shown by Jack Bilbo in his gallery of Modern Art [a checklist of modern painters, Bilbo, 1946].

== Artistic legacy ==
Stockley's work asks to be taken seriously; he set out to be a great professional painter, not a Sunday painter or amateur. Although there are Stockley characteristics which make all his paintings distinctly his own, he worked in fact in a number of styles. His failure to achieve the success he longed for says more about the nature of British culture than his ability as an artist. His physical and intellectual isolation from other artists made him dependent on his patrons, particularly on Lucy Wertheim. He was prepared to tackle ambitious themes, especially in his earlier work, and painted with an extraordinary boldness and freshness of vision. He is a colourist of subtlety and daring and, as the Times critic pointed out, has the power to give ordinary things a symbolic strangeness. His work at its best is both primitive in its directness and energy, and sophisticated in its execution. Although the illustrations to Pilgrims Progress are often crude in execution, they contain his most original imagery. He is little known now because most of his best work was hidden away in attics or in the reserve collections of small museums—or simply lost or destroyed.

His art possesses its own intrinsic merit, as seen, for example, in the paintings of St Martins in the Fields and Trafalgar Reflections, but it also carries historic and documentary interest. His London scenes record, for example—life on the Thames, London Parks, Trafalgar Square, St Martins in the 1930s and 1940s. Such paintings as The City Saved 41, depicting Saint Paul's in the blitz, are a painterly response to historic events. His association with his patron, Lucy Wertheim, a significant collectors of the 1930s, g a new perspective on the artist/patron relationship. This, together with his championship by Jack Bilbo, establishes Stockley a key figure in the history of art in the twentieth century

With no one particularly interested in his work, although it occasionally cropped up in the literature, his reputation languished. Now is the time to revalue him; quirky, primitive, naive, visionary, sophisticated, but never boring. Like Blake, he records his visions of visions, as in his illustrations to Bunyan or religious paintings; yet he also finds new ways of depicting what he could see or remember, in, for example, his London scenes. He continually produces images that surprise us with their remarkable originality, handling paint with energy and complete absorption in his medium. Stockley is primitive in his directness, and, as the Times critic says, he does not worry over accuracy. But his work is far from simple: the early unsympathetic critics misread his humour and strangeness. There is far more artifice than naivety. "The know alls," he would say, "never do know quite enough."

In 1966 he wrote to Lucy Wertheim who, at the age of eighty, has asked to see him to discuss a Trust and his series of Bunyan Paintings she had first shown in 1932. He was 74:

I am what you might call finished – I have no correspondence – I go nowhere except in summer time ... no freedom – no chance to meet anyone outside of family – and now it is bitterly cold here & I am off to bed in the warm if I can keep warm – Form your Trust and forget me ...

== Authentication ==
There is never any doubt as to the genuineness of a Stockley: all his paintings are signed, usually twice, often boldly on the reverse, in capital letters, painted by Henry Stockley. He often incorporates his name or initials into the painting itself so that HSS appear in odd places, hidden in buildings, buses, hedges, and railings. Dating his paintings can be more difficult. Later in his life he re-dated some of his work. The earliest pieces he left untouched. He did not always give a date. He made copies of favourite pictures, usually for relatives. He was also in the habit, unknown to his patron, of keeping his best paintings for the family and sending Lucy hurriedly executed copies.

The largest collection of paintings and drawings by Henry Stockley is in private collection and includes some 90 items, with the little of his writing that has survived. Jimmie Hume, Lucy Wertheim's son in law, transcribed a number of Stockley's letters to his patron and these are a key source of information. Stockley's work is also held in collections in Eastbourne and Salford, Auckland (New Zealand) and by the London Transport Museum.

== Painting exhibitions ==
Year	Exhibit name	Source	Image Titles
1932	Illustrations to Bunyan's Pilgrims Progress	Private view 22 September 1932, Catalogue.	
1934	Naive Paintings by Christopher Wood, Busdriver Stockley and others	Wertheim Gallery, 3–5 Burlington Gardens W.1. Private View 4 April 1934. No Catalogue.	
1935	Modern Primitives	Wertheim Gallery, 3–5 Burlington Gardens W.1. Illustration in Listener, 13 November 1935. No Catalogue.	
1936	Ten English Painters	Wertheim Gallery, 8 Burlington Gardens W.1. Private view Card in Adventure p. 64.	
1937	45 Paintings by 10 Modern Artists from the Wertheim Gallery	Altrincham Public Libraries, Museum and Art Galleries Spring 1937. Catalogue {photocopy}	
1938	Twelve Free-Thinkers in Paintings	Wertheim Gallery, 8 Burlington Gardens W.1. Review in Daily Sketch 11 February 1938 & Private view card in Adventure p. 64	The Kill, and Trafalgar Square.
1938	An Exhibition of Paintings by Unprofessional Painters	Bensham Grove Settlement, Gateshead 8–22 October 1938. William Feaver Pitmen Painters [1989] p. 76–77. Catalogue {photocopy}	The Park, Flatters Nets, The Return, Christian and the Lions, Hyde Park, St Martins in the Fields, King George the Fifth.
1939	Paintings for Children	Wertheim Gallery, 8 Burlington Gardens W.1.Review in Daily Sketch, 19 April 1939	20 illustrations in oil from Bunyan's Pilgrims' Progress
1941	Exhibition at Mosley Street, Manchester	Midday Studio, 96 Mosley Street, Manchester, Article in Kentish Times, 5 December 1941.	
1942	Paintings of Boats [Sometimes Incidental]	Midday Studio, 96 Mosley Street, Manchester 5 February 1942 Including painting by Wood, Gibb, Vivin.	
1942	Selection of Modern Paintings from the Wertheim Collection	Harris Museum and Art Gallery, Preston 9 November – 19 December Catalogue, Including Wood, Matthew Smith.	
1944	November Exhibition 1944: Masterpieces by Great Masters, Van Gogh, Picasso, Renoir and Paintings by Dennis Harrington and Henry Stockley	The modern art gallery ltd 24 Charles 11 Street Haymarket S.W.1.Private view card; letter from Jack Bilbo.	
1944	Our Friend the Horse	Midday Studio, 96 Mosley Street, Manchester, Review in Manchester Guardian 14 July 1944, Private view card including works by Wood, Vivin.	
	English Countryside	Midday Studio, 96 Mosley Street, Manchester, Kentish Times cutting, undated.	
1946	Exhibition of Contemporary British Art	Grundy Art Gallery, Blackpool and County Borough of Bolton Art Gallery, Catalogue July to September 1946 & 21 October to 16 November 1946 Eynsford [Winter].	
1947	Examples of work from Mrs Wertheim's Collection	St George's Gallery 81 Grosvenor Street W.1. Catalogue 10 February to 4 March 1947, including works by Wallis, Wood, Hodgkins, Vivin.	
1948	'London Transport Second Annual Exhibition	55 Broadway S.W.1. 30 October 1948 Catalogue and private view card	Farningham Church; West Kent Hounds, Eynsford; Picadilly; Southend [Night] (watercolour).
1949	London Transport Third Annual Exhibition	55 Broadway s.W.1. Catalogue [incomplete]	Bus in Snow nr. Eynsford; London Walks – No Basic; London Bridge, Fairground Blackheath; Hounds and Hunters at the Kill.
1950	London Transport Fourth Annual Exhibition	Exhibition Hall Charing Cross Station 4 November 1950 private view card	
1952	London Transport Fifth Annual Exhibition	Exhibition Hall Charing Cross Station 22 November to 13 December 1952 Catalogue	Lambeth Bridge [Night], Epsom Derby, London Street Scene, The Wellington High Tide, Sparrow Hawk, Off Gravesend.
1952 {circa}	Exhibition of Modern Paintings	The Old Tithe Barn, Ashford-in-the-Water Private View card including works by Wood, Wallis, Gibb.	
1953	London Transport Seventh Annual Exhibition	Exhibition Hall Charing Cross Station 28 November to 19 December 1953 Catalogue	Farningham Kent, I never, Eynsford Kent
1954	London Transport Eight Annual Exhibition	Exhibition Hall Charing Cross Station 13 November to 4 December 1954	On Royston Heath, London Embankment, Blackwall, In the Woods, This England
1962	Naive Paintings	Art Today Gallery; 3 New Road, Shoreham by Seafrom 16 June 1962 with Wallis, Wood, Vivin, Ilse, and Burton p.v. card	
1987	Lucy Wertheim Collection	Duncan Campbell Fine Art 15 Thackeray Street W.8. 3 November to 23 December 1987 Catalogue {photocopy}	13 works by Henry Stockley., plus Gibb, Suddaby, Racoczi.
1989	An Exhibition of Naive Paintings by 'Busdriver' Stockley	Space Frame Gallery Green Street Gillingham Kent.October 1989 Catalogue with introduction;	36 items.
1991/2	Adventure in Art	Modern British art under the patronage of Lucy Wertheim Salford Museum and Art Gallery, Towner Art Gallery and Museum, Dudley Museum and Art Gallery Catalogue	Evelyn Laye in Hyde Park
1996/7	Henry Stockley: Bus Driver and Artist	London Transport Museum, Ashfield Gallery Covent Garden, London, descriptive panels [no Catalogue] 19 July 1996 to March 1997.	20 paintings, photographs and memorabilia.

== Bibliography ==
- Ayres, James, [1980]. English Naive Painting 1750–1900, London: Thames and Hudson.
- Bilbo, Jack [1948]. Paintings and Drawings by Jack Bilbo, The Modern Art Gallery, London.
- Bilbo, Jack [1948]. Jack Bilbo, An Autobiography, The Modern Art Gallery, London.
- Bihalji-Merin, Oto and Tomasevic, N. [1984]. World Encyclopaedia of Naive Art, London: Frederick Muller.
- Cooper, Emmanuel [1994]. People's Art, Edinburgh: Mainstream Publishing.
- England & Co. [1990]. Jack Bilbo and the Moderns, London: England & Co.
- Farr, Dennis [1978]. English Art 1870–1940, Oxford: OUP.
- Feaver, William. [1985] Pitmen Painters, London: Chatto and Windus.
- Gale, Matthew [1998]. Alfred Wallis, London: Tate Gallery Publishing.
- Hume, Jimmie [1992]. Introduction, in Adventure in Art: Modern British Art under the Patronage of Lucy Wertheim, Salford Museum and Towner Art Gallery.
- Ingleby, Richard [1995]. Christopher Wood, London: Allison and Busby.
- Listener, 13 November 1935, p 62.
- Maizels, John [from 1989]. Raw Vision, a Journal.
- Norman, Geraldine [1993]. "Brut Force," in Independent on Sunday, 30 May 1993: 18–21.
- Trevelyan, Julian [1957]. Indigo Days, London: McGibbon and Kee.
- Walker, John (ed) [1994]. Stockley on the Buses, Ed Street, Longfield.
- Walker, John [1989]. Busdriver Stockley, Space Frame Gallery, Gillingham.
- Walker, John [1996]. Of my Own Free Will. Henry Stockley: the Unknown Primitive, Raw Vision. No 15 Summer 1996:26/27.
- Wertheim, Lucy [1947]. Adventure in Art, London: Nicholson and Watson.
- Wertheim, Lucy [ed], [1934]. Phoebus Calling, Spring Number.
