= Dorothy Blackham =

Irish illustrator, artist, and teacher

- Born: Dorothy Isabel Blackham; 1 March 1896; Rathmines, Dublin, Ireland
- Died: 3 September 1975 (aged 79); Donaghadee, County Down
- Other name: Dorothy Stewart
- Education: Royal Hibernian Academy; Dublin Metropolitan School of Art; Goldsmiths College, 1922
- Movement: The White Stag Group
- Spouse: Elsner Stewart (m. 1947)

Dorothy Isabel Blackham (married name Stewart; 1 March 1896 – 4 September 1975) was an Irish painter and teacher.

== Early life and education ==
Blackham was born on 1 March 1896 in Rathmines, Dublin to Charles H. Blackham, chief cashier at Kingsbridge railway station, and Jane Ruthven Blackham (née Lowry). Through her father, Blackham was related to the Wharton family of artists and was the maternal granddaughter of Thomas Kennedy Lowry (c. 1811–1872), an antiquarian and crown prosecutor.

Blackham first studied at the Royal Hibernian Academy under Dermod O'Brien, where she developed an interest in poster design. Blackham later attended the Dublin Metropolitan School of Art before studying at Goldsmiths College between 1921 and 1922.

== Artistic career ==
Blackham was a prolific artist, exhibiting and contributing throughout Ireland. From 1916 to 1946, she exhibited regularly with the RHA, with her work also being shown by the Ulster Society of Women Artists, the Water Colour Society of Ireland, and the Arts and Crafts Society of Ireland. From 1924 she was exhibited at the Tailteann Games, winning medals in 1928 and 1932. Her friend, and fellow artist, Mainie Jellett was a significant influence on Blackham. Through Jellett, she became interested in The White Stag group and exhibited with them four times between 1940 and 1941. She was a member of the Dublin Painters' Society, exhibiting with them in the late 1930s. She was also active with the Picture Hire Club from 1941 to 1942. It was at this time that Blackham experimented with lino-cuts, creating large landscape prints. As a close friend of Elizabeth and Lily Yeats, she collaborated extensively with the Cuala Press, creating wood and lino cuts for illustrations and greetings-cards. Blackham also produced illustrations for the Cluna Press, the Irish Tourist Association, The Bell, and The Ideal Irish Home. She designed the cover of The Boyne Valley and its antiquities (1936), a booklet by Rev. Myles V. Ronan. As well as being an active artist, she taught in a number of Dublin schools, including Alexandra College from 1936 to 1943 and the Hall School, Monkstown.

Blackham worked as an assistant warden at the Gibraltarian Evacuation Camp in Derry. She married Elsner Stewart in 1947, and the couple moved to London. Whilst there, Blackham continued her career as a teacher, and exhibited under her maiden name. She was exhibited by the Royal Academy of Arts, the Royal West of England Academy, the United Society of Artists, and the Royal Society of British Artists. Her work generally drew on Ireland for inspiration, in particular the north and west of the country, she also created works based on scenes in London and continental Europe.

== Later life and legacy ==
Blackham and her husband returned to Ireland in 1967, settling in Donaghadee, County Down. She suffered from arthritis in her later years, but she continued to paint until her death. Blackham died on 4 September 1975, at Donaghadee. Two posthumous exhibitions of her work were held at Queen's University Belfast (QUB) in 1976, and at the Neptune Gallery, Dublin in 1977. Examples of her work are held in the collections of QUB, the Hugh Lane Gallery, and the South London Gallery. Her work is also held as part of the Anna Russell collection of Yeats material at the National Gallery of Ireland.
