= Alina Bolesławicz-Moffett =

Polish architect active in London (1920–1998)

Alina Zofia Bolesławicz-Moffett (née Bolesławicz: 14 September 1920 – 8 January 1998) was a Polish architect active in London.

== Biography ==
Alina Zofia Bolesławicz was born in the Second Polish Republic (present-day Poland) on 14 September 1920.

Bolesławicz-Moffett studied architecture at the Polish University College in London. (Note: A university established in by the Polish government-in-exile.) In 1956, Bolesławicz-Moffett married the Irish architect and educator Noel Moffett. Bolesławicz-Moffett and her husband founded Noel Moffett and Associates in 1960, and worked together as architects and architecture consultants.

On 8 January 1998, Bolesławicz-Moffett died in Chelsea aged 77.
