= Peter F. C. Gilbert =

English neuroscientist and businessman

Peter Francis Cecil Gilbert
- Born: 7 July 1944 (age 82); Edinburgh, United Kingdom
- Education: University of Cambridge (MA, PhD); London Business School (MSc)
- Scientific career
- Fields: Neuroscience; Biophysics; Molecular biology
- Workplaces: University College London; Washington University in St. Louis; Yale University; State University of New York, Buffalo; Laboratory of Molecular Biology, Cambridge; University of Cambridge

Peter Francis Cecil Gilbert (born 7 July 1944) is an English neuroscientist and biophysicist. He is known for his pioneering work on motor learning in the cerebellum.

== Early life and education ==
Gilbert was educated at the Royal Grammar School, Newcastle upon Tyne. He went on to attend Gonville and Caius College, Cambridge on a college scholarship, graduating in 1966 with a degree in natural sciences. Remaining in Cambridge, he pursued a PhD at the MRC Laboratory of Molecular Biology, under the supervision of Aaron Klug, researching the structure of tobacco mosaic virus protein.

== Career and research ==
Upon finishing his PhD in 1970, Gilbert continued his research at the MRC Laboratory of Molecular Biology as a staff scientist. During this time, Gilbert developed Simultaneous Iterative Reconstruction Technique (SIRT) – an iterative method for reconstructing the three-dimensional structure of objects from two-dimensional projections. The original SIRT, as proposed by Gilbert, along with the family of variants that it spawned (known as SIRT-like), have widespread applications across medicine and biology, such as CT scans and cryo-EM.

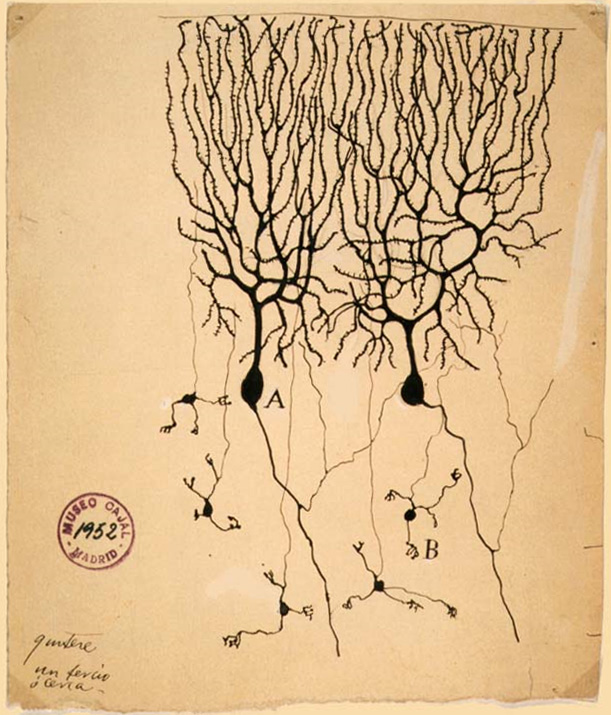
Drawing of Purkinje cells by Santiago Ramón y Cajal. Gilbert and Thach demonstrated a role of Purkinje cells in the cerebellum for motor learning.

In 1974, Gilbert moved into the field of neuroscience, joining the laboratory of Sir John Eccles at the State University of New York, Buffalo as a visiting professor, where he investigated the neurophysiology of the monkey cerebellum. Towards the end of 1974 and after completing his work in the Eccles laboratory, Gilbert partnered with Dr W. T. Thach at Yale School of Medicine. Over the next two years, and later, at Washington University School of Medicine, the pair carried out pioneering work on cerebellar motor learning. By recording from the Purkinje cells of conscious monkeys learning a manual task, Gilbert and Thach tested and confirmed theoretical predictions on motor learning in the cerebellum.

Besides his experimental work, Gilbert has produced a number of theories on cerebellar motor learning and has published his theories in Nature and other journals. Since 2000, he has expanded his focus from the cerebellum to the entire brain; he is currently devoting his time to producing a unifying theory of brain function.

== Personal life ==
Gilbert is the great-grandson of Sir Alfred Gilbert, the foremost member of the New Sculpture movement, and the nephew of Stephen Gilbert. He married twice and has four children.

== See also ==
- Cerebellum
