= Jocelyn Chewett =

Canadian sculptor active in Paris (1906–1979)

- Born: Jocelyn Margery Chewett; 20 December 1906; Weston, Ontario, Canada
- Died: June 1979 (aged 72); London, UK
- Other name: Jocelyn Gilbert
- Education: Slade School of Fine Art, 1927–1930 (didn't graduate)
- Movement: The White Stag Group
- Spouse: Stephen Gilbert (m. 1935)
- Children: 2

Jocelyn Margery Chewett (married name Gilbert; 20 December 1906 – June 1979) was a Canadian sculptor active in Paris. During the Second World War Chewett lived in Dublin and was a member of The White Stag Group.

== Early life and education ==
Chewett was born on 20 December 1906 at her family's farm in the then town of Weston, Ontario (present-day Toronto) to James Chewett (1868–1917), a mining engineer, and Alice Isabella Chewett (née Ward; 1877–1925). Chewett's father was Canadian and her mother was English. The second of three sisters, Chewett was the paternal niece of the artist Albert Ranney Chewett (1877–1965).

In 1913, the Chewett family visited England however, the outbreak of First World War prevented the family from returning to Canada. The family later relocated to Cold Ash, Berkshire where they joined the Order of Silence. Following her mother's death in 1925 (Note: Also cited as 1924.), Chewett lived with her uncle in Bushey.

Chewett first studied sociology and comparative religion before enrolling at Slade School of Fine Art in October 1927 (Note: Also cited as 1929.). Initially studying painting under Henry Tonks, Chewett later studied sculpture under Alfred Horace Gerrard. Whilst studying, Chewett met her future husband Stephen Gilbert, and lived for a time with Ithell Colquhoun. In 1930 (Note: Also cited as 1931.), Chewett left the Slade without completing her degree.

== Career ==
In 1931, Chewett relocated to Paris where for two years she worked and studied at the atelier of Ossip Zadkine. Under Zadkine, Chewett was introduced to Cubist principles and learnt direct carving into wood and stone. Also influenced by the work of Constantin Brâncuși, Chewett developed a neo-Cubist style. In 1932, Chewett exhibited at the Société Nationale des Beaux-Arts and at the Salon des Tuileries between 1932 and 1934. In 1935, Chewett returned to London where she married the painter and sculptor Stephen Gilbert. In 1938 (Note: Also cited as 1939.), Chewett and Gilbert settled in Paris.

Following the outbreak of Second World War, Chewett and Gilbert settled in Dublin. The couple joined the The White Stag Group in 1940, with Chewett being the group's only sculptor. In 1946, Chewett and Gilbert returned to Paris and settled in the Rue Saint-Jacques. From 1948 to 1951, Chewett exhibited at the Salon des surindépendants and at the Salon de la jeune sculpture in 1952 and 1953. In 1950, Chewett's work moved towards abstraction under the influence of Kazimir Malevich and Georges Vantongerloo . In 1966, Chewett founded her own atelier on the Impasse du Rouet.

== Personal life ==
Chewett and Gilbert had two children. In June 1979 Chewett died in London, aged 72.
