= Lilla Vanston =

Irish sculptor and portrait painter

- Born: Lydia Mary Coffey; 16 May 1870; Mogorban, Fethard, County Tipperary, Ireland
- Died: 23 March 1959 (aged 88); Royal City of Dublin Hospital, Dublin
- Education: Dublin Metropolitan School of Art
- Known for: Sculpture and portrait painting
- Notable work: Portrait of Thomas O'Neill Russell
- Spouse: John S. Vanston

Lilla Mary Vanston (16 May 1870 – 23 March 1959) was an Irish sculptor and portrait painter.

== Life ==
Lilla Vanston was born Lydia Mary Coffey on 16 May 1870. She was one of two daughters of the Rev. John T. Coffey, who was rector of Mogorban, Fethard, County Tipperary, and Lizzie Moulson, daughter of the Rev. George Nesbitt. She attended the Dublin Metropolitan School of Art. Around 1900, she married John S. Vanston, a solicitor. Vanston became a member of the Gaelic League, and visited the Gaeltacht on Achill Island regularly. The couple had one daughter, Dairine, who would also go on to become an artist.

== Artistic career ==
Vanston exhibited a medallion at the 1898 Royal Hibernian Academy (RHA) show, and another work in 1903. She was featured in the 1907 and 1911 Oireachtas na Gaeilge exhibitions. She exhibited ten works with the RHA between 1904 and 1921, largely portraits and statuettes. One such portrait was the Gaelic League activist, Thomas O'Neill Russell from 1904. Vanston wished to use her art for patriotic purposes, and was associated with the Irish Art Companions, a group founded in 1904 by Charles Tindal Gatty with the aim of reviving Irish art, particularly to provide an alternative to imported ecclesiastical statues. At 27–28 Clare Street, Dublin, the group had its own plaster mill and could cast primarily ecclesiastical statues, which were then bronzed and tinted. A 1907 plaque by Vanston for the group was exhibited at the 1910 Arts and Crafts Society of Ireland exhibition. The plaque was titled The lament of Banba or Erin mourns for her dead heroes, and The Irish Times called it "one of the most beautiful decorative designs we have seen here for some time . . . it shows wonderful grace and freedom." She was also involved with the United Arts Club, a group which included Jack Butler Yeats.

== Later life and legacy ==
Vanston was widowed by the 1920s, and went to Paris, where her daughter was studying. Whilst there, she exhibited at the Salon d'Automne. She would frequently spend time in Paris, until the outbreak of World War II, by which time it is thought she had become a Buddhist. Vanston lived at 13 Herbert Street until she died on 23 March 1959 in the Royal City of Dublin Hospital.
