= Kathleen Walne =

English painter (1915-2011)

- Born: 3 October 1915; Ipswich, England
- Died: 30 June 2011 (aged 95); Brighton, England
- Education: Ipswich Art School
- Known for: Watercolour painting
- Spouse: Frank Ward (m.1938-1998, his death)

Kathleen Walne (3 October 1915 – 30 June 2011) was a British artist notable for her colourful style of watercolour painting.

== Biography ==
Walne was born in Ipswich, the fourth of seven children to Ruby and Herbert Walne. After a childhood marred by illness and long absences from school, Walne entered the Ipswich Art School on a £1 a week scholarship in 1930. Originally assigned to the design school she soon joined the painting class where she met her future husband, Frank Ward. In 1933 Ward moved to London to study at the Royal College of Art. He also promoted Walne's works by taking examples to show West End galleries and dealers. After numerous refusals and rejections, Lucy Wertheim, the owner of the Wertheim Gallery, agreed to act on Walne's behalf. This was the start of a lifelong friendship between the two. Wertheim gave Walne a solo show in 1935 and for a time she worked at the gallery as a general help. Also in 1935, works by Walne were included in a show of contemporary watercolours at the Salford Art Gallery. The Salford Art Gallery went on to collect works by Walne throughout her career and gave her a retrospective exhibition in 1986.

Walne and Ward married in 1938 and they had three children together. In 1939 Ward took a teaching post at Wilson's boys grammar school in Camberwell and, other than for his time in the army during the Second World War, remained there until his retirement in 1974. After the war, the couple lived in Chelsea but in 1968 moved to Brighton to nurse Lucy Wertheim, who had been diagnosed with cancer. Walne and Ward had a joint exhibition at the Compendium 2 Gallery in 1972 and another together in Brighton in 1975. In 1991 the Salford Art Gallery mounted a tribute show to Wertheim, Adventure in Art, which featured works by Walne and other artists she had promoted. As well as Salford, the Towner Art Gallery in Eastbourne and the Auckland Art Gallery Toi o Tāmaki in New Zealand hold examples of her work.
