= Kenneth Hall (artist) =

British artist (1913-1946)

- Born: Charles Kenneth Hall; 15 April 1913; Lewisham, London, UKGBI
- Died: 26 July 1946 (aged 33); Marylebone, London, UK
- Occupations: Artist; painter; drafter; designer
- Known for: Co-founder of The White Stag Group
- Style: Expressionism
- Movement: The White Stag Group

Charles Kenneth Hall (1913–1946), known as Kenneth Hall, was a British artist, painter, drafter and designer known for co-founding the Irish The White Stag art group with Basil Rákóczi.

== Early life and education ==
Charles Kenneth Hall was born in Lewisham, London (Note: Commonly misattributed as Farnham, Surrey.) on 15 April 1913 to Arthur Henry Hall and Maud Henrietta Hall (née Webster). Hall's father was an assistant mechanical engineer at the Royal Arsenal and later became the Chief Superintendent at Royal Aircraft Establishment. Hall's mother was Irish and was born in Cork.

From 1927 to 1931, Hall attended Lancing College. In 1931, Hall moved to London and studied furniture design at an interior design firm. Whilst studying Hall began drawing and painting in his spare time.

== Career ==
In 1934, Hall showed his portfolio to the collector, patron and gallerist Lucy Wertheim. Wertheim exhibited Hall's work at the Wertheim Gallery a few months later, marking his exhibiting debut.

In July 1935, Hall meet Rákóczi at a meeting for the Society for Creative Psychology. The same year Hall and Rákóczi founded The White Stag Group with the aim of promoting the advancement of subjectivity in psychological analysis and art.

From 1935 to 1938 Hall and Rakozci travelled Europe and acquainted themselves with the various movements of the time including Surrealism. At the outbreak of World War II the pair moved to Ireland to try to avoid the conflict that was consuming Europe. They stopped first in Galway where they did much good work before heading to Dublin, where The White Stag group began to really take off. Hall organised the group's first exhibition held in April 1940, and it was received well, with praise from the Irish Times.

In 1945 he returned to London and had an exhibition at Redfern Gallery, before moving to Wertheim's flat in Marylebone, London whilst she was in Manchester.

=== Style ===
Hall received some art lessons from Juan Stoll, an architect, designer and fellow member of The White Stag Group, but was largely self-taught. Hall painted in an Expressionist style and was influenced by the works of Christopher Wood, Alfred Wallis, Paul Klee and Patrick Scott.

== Personal life ==
Despite the success of the exhibition and the growing depth and influence of the group in Dublin, as well as support from Wertheim in London, Hall was always racked by personal demons, and people found him hard to connect with. His personal relationship with Rakoczi it has been suggested was also part of the problem. According to Irish art critic Bruce Arnold, "No one understood anything about Kenneth Hall… He was depressive, he was gay, he had this love affair with Basil, who was bisexual and very active emotionally and sexually. Kenneth Hall couldn’t take that.”

On 26 July 1946 Hall died by suicide in Wertheim's Marylebone flat, aged 33.

== Legacy ==
Several of Hall's oil paintings are in UK public collections, including the National Museums Northern Ireland.
