= William Henry Pearson =

- Born: July 22, 1849; Pendleton, Lancashire, UKGBI
- Died: 19 April 1923 (aged 73); Withington, Manchester, UKGBI
- Known for: The Hepaticae of the British Isles: Being Figures and Descriptions of All Known British Species (1902)
- Spouse: Annie Pearson (m. 1882)
- Children: 4 including, Lucy Wertheim
- Scientific career
- Fields: Botany; bryology
- Author abbrev. (botany): Pearson

William Henry Pearson (1849–1923) was an English botanist and bryologist specialising in liverworts, known for The Hepaticae of the British Isles: Being Figures and Descriptions of All Known British Species (1902).

== Biography ==
William Henry Pearson was born on 22 July 1849 in Pendleton (present-day, Greater Manchester) to Thomas Pearson, an assistant manager at a printers, and Mary Hannah Pearson. Pearson was the eldest of six siblings.

After secondary education, William Henry Pearson was employed by a Manchester company of yarn agents. After some years, he went into business for himself in the yarn trade. When he was in his late thirties and early forties, he lived in Eccles, Greater Manchester. There he became a friend of Benjamin Carrington and studied botany in some of the classes taught by Carrington. Richard Spruce encouraged Pearson to specialise in bryology. With Benjamin Carrington he issued an exsiccata series under the title Hepaticae Britannicae exsiccatae (1878–1890).

Pearson studied not only the British hepatics, but also those of Australia, New Zealand, and Canada. He published articles in the Journal of Botany, The Naturalist, and The Rucksack Club Journal. He was a member of several natural history societies (including the Rucksack Club) and the Manchester Museum Committee.

He joined the Moss Exchange Club in 1908, and was elected an honorary member in the same year. He was elected vice-President of the newly formed British Bryological Society in 1923. His herbarium is at the Natural History Museum in London, with additional plants at Bolton Museum. 100 of his Welsh liverworts were sold to the National Museum of Wales at Cardiff in 1913. Manchester Museum has bryophytes that he collected from 1878 onwards.

== Personal life ==
In 1882, Pearson married Annie Pearson (née Dearden; 1854–1927). Together they had four children, including the collector, patron and gallerist Lucy Wertheim (née Pearson; 1883–1971).

On 19 April 1923 Pearson died in Withington, Manchester aged 73.

== Selected publications ==
- Geological Survey of Canada; Pearson, William Henry (1890). List of Canadian Hepaticæ. Montreal: WM. Foster Brown & Co.
- The Hepaticae of the British Isles, Being Figures and Descriptions of All Known British Species Vol.II Text. Vol. I (1 ed.). London: Lovell Reeve & Co. 1902.
- The Hepaticae of the British Isles, Being Figures and Descriptions of All Known British Species Vol.II Plates. Vol. II (1 ed.). London: Lovell Reeve & Co. 1902.
