= Noel Moffett =

Irish architect and educator (1912–1994)

- Born: 25 December 1912; Cork, Ireland
- Died: 17 May 1994 (aged 81); London, UK
- Education: Trinity College Dublin; University of Liverpool, 1938, 1939
- Occupations: Architect; educator
- Movement: The White Stag Group
- Spouses: Margot Moffett (m. 1938) Simone Combes (m. 1950) Alina Bolesławicz-Moffett (m. 1956)
- Children: 1
- Relatives: Thomas Cullen Young (ex-father-in-law)

William Noel Moffett (25 December 1912 – 17 May 1994) was an Irish architect and educator, active in London and Dublin.

== Early life and education ==
Moffett was born 25 December 1912 in Cork to John Moffett, a merchant, and Emily Beatrix Heron (died 1917). Moffett's father was Irish while his mother was British. Raised in a Presbyterian family, Moffett was the fifth of seven siblings.

Educated at Cork Grammar School and Mountjoy School, Moffett later attended Trinity College Dublin. Moffett graduated from the University of Liverpool with a degree in architecture in 1938, and in urban planning the following year.

== Career ==
Between 1938 and 1939, Moffett worked at the office of Serge Chermayeff. During this period Moffett worked on Chermayeff's Bentley Wood house. Moffett also worked briefly for the offices of Joseph Emberton and the architecture firm Burnet, Tait and Lorne during the late 1930s. Following the outbreak of the Second World War, Moffett returned to Ireland with his wife Margot Moffett. Settling in Dublin, Moffett and Margot became involved with The White Stag Group. Moffett redesigned the interior of the Jammet Restaurant around 1940, and began working for the Dublin Corporation in 1941.

In 1944, Moffett set up his own architecture company and private architecture school. Sometime between 1949 and 1950, Moffett left Dublin and settled in London and began teaching at the Kingston College of Art. In 1960, Moffett and his wife Alina Bolesławicz-Moffett founded Noel Moffett and Associates and worked together as architects and architecture consultants.

Between 1962 and 1970, Moffett was the head of town planning at the Kingston College of Art]. During the 1970s and 1980s Moffett was a visiting architecture professor at Iowa University and Washington State University.

== Personal life ==
In 1938, Moffett married Marguerita "Margot" Catherine Mary Moffett (née Young; born 1916), the daughter of Thomas Cullen Young. In 1950, he married Simone Combes, and in 1956 to Alina Zofia Bolesławicz-Moffett (née Bolesławicz; 1920–1998) (Note: Also cited as Alina Bolesławicz.), a Polish architect and educator. Moffett had one son.

On 17 May 1994, Moffett died in London aged 81.
