= Conspirator (1949 film) =

1949 British film by Victor Saville

- Theatrical release poster
- Directed by: Victor Saville
- Written by: Sally Benson; Gerard Fairlie
- Screenplay by: Sally Benson
- Based on: Conspirator; 1948 novel by Humphrey Slater
- Produced by: Arthur Hornblow Jr.
- Starring: Robert Taylor; Elizabeth Taylor
- Cinematography: Freddie Young
- Edited by: Frank Clarke
- Music by: John Wooldridge
- Production company: Metro-Goldwyn-Mayer
- Distributed by: Loew's Inc.
- Release dates: 9 December 1949 (UK); 24 March 1950 (USA)
- Running time: 87 minutes
- Country: United Kingdom
- Language: English
- Budget: $1,832,000
- Box office: $1,591,000

Conspirator is a 1949 British film noir, suspense, espionage and thriller film directed by Victor Saville and starring Robert Taylor and Elizabeth Taylor. It was written by Sally Benson and Gerard Fairlie based on the 1948 novel Conspirator by Humphrey Slater. The story concerns an American woman who falls in love with a Soviet spy, who must choose between his marriage and his ideology.

== Plot ==
While visiting England, 18-year-old Melinda Greyton attends a regimental ball, where she meets handsome major Michael Curragh, and a whirlwind courtship follows.

After the marriage and honeymoon, Melinda learns that her husband is a Soviet spy. Michael pretends to abandon his career of espionage but soon discovers that his superiors have ordered him to kill Melinda.

== Cast ==
- Robert Taylor as Major Michael Curragh
- Elizabeth Taylor as Melinda Greyton
- Robert Flemyng as Captain Hugh Ladholme
- Harold Warrender as Colonel Hammerbrook
- Honor Blackman as Joyce
- Marjorie Fielding as Aunt Jessica
- Thora Hird as Broaders
- Wilfrid Hyde-White as Lord Pennistone
- Marie Ney as Lady Pennistone
- Jack Allen as Raglan
- Helen Haye as Lady Witheringham
- Cicely Paget-Bowman as Mrs. Hammerbrook
- Karel Stepanek as Radek
- Nicholas Bruce as Alek
- Cyril Smith as Detective Inspector
- Janette Scott as Toby, Aunt Jessica's grandchild (uncredited)

== Production ==
The producers were careful to cut mentions in the film of the British traitors during World War II, such as John Amery and Norman Baillie-Stewart, for fear of litigation from their families. However, an indirect mention of Baillie-Stewart remains in the film when he is simply called "that fellow in the tower".

Robert Taylor, a staunch political conservative and strident opponent of communism who plays a Soviet spy in the film, said: "It is a full acting role but a mighty unpleasant character." Taylor, who was in his late 30s, plays the romantic lead of Elizabeth Taylor, who was 16 at the time of production. When Melinda is asked her age by Aunt Jessica, Taylor's voice is heard replying "18", but her lips appear to speak "17", suggesting that the producers may have dubbed the line in post-production to avoid controversy and trouble with the Production Code Administration.

While on set in England, Elizabeth Taylor was required to spend three hours per day in an improvised schoolroom under the tutelage of a teacher sent by the Los Angeles Board of Education. Although British law did not mandate schooling beyond the age of 14, the producers were obliged to abide by California law.

== Reception ==
=== Boxoffice ===
According to MGM records, the film earned $859,000 in the U.S. and Canada and $732,000 overseas, resulting in a loss to the studio of $804,000.

=== Critical ===
The Monthly Film Bulletin wrote: "A technically proficient, but otherwise entirely unremarkable melodrama. The cameraman distinguishes himself with three or four fine exterior shots; script, acting and direction are uniformly devoid of life, interest, or verisimilitude."

Kine Weekly wrote: "The film takes a very half-hearted crack at the Communists and it is its reluctance openly to name the enemy, even more than its fantastic suggestion of treason by a Guards officer, and its loose ends that takes the edge off its promising 'frightened lady' stuff. Its vague and lopsided hokum is not, however, entirely devoid of popular appeal, and it is because of this and its undeniable star and title values that it is given the benefit of many doubts, anyway for the crowd."

Variety wrote: "It is a highly fanciful treatment of an obvious anti-Commie character, bearing little relation to the situation as it exists in Britain today. This is obviously designed to cash in on the current political bandwagon, and will probably have a better success in the U.S. than in Britain. Apart from its unconvincing treatment the pic, notwithstanding two boxoffice names in Robert Taylor and Elizabeth Taylor, falls down in its departure from normal convention. Here is-a boy-meets-girl plot without the familiar happy ending, and this will inevitably disappoint many of the younger fans. In the unfolding of the major theme the story lacks dramatic intensity, and little effort is made to justify the action of the central character."

== See also ==
- List of British films of 1949
