= Benjamin Carrington =

British botanist and taxonomist (1827–1893)

Benjamin Carrington FRSE FLS MRCS (18 January 1827 – 18 January 1893) was a British botanist and taxonomist in the late 19th century. He was a specialist in bryophytes, cryptogams, fungi and lichens, and wrote extensively on these subjects. With William Henry Pearson he issued an exsiccata series with the title Hepaticae Britannicae exsiccatae (1878–1890).

== Life ==
He was born on 18 January 1827 in Lincoln, England. He studied medicine at the University of Edinburgh, and graduated with the MD thesis "Entophytes found on man" in 1851. He worked as a General Practitioner variously in Radcliffe (near Manchester), Lincoln, Yeadon, Southport and Eccles, but he is remembered for his contributions to botany as an amateur collector and author.

In 1861 he was elected a Fellow of the Linnean Society and he was elected a Fellow of the Royal Society of Edinburgh in 1874, his proposers including Joseph Lister.

He died on his 66th birthday in Brighton on 18 January 1893. He is buried in Carlton Hill Cemetery in Brighton.

== Artistic recognition ==
His portrait is held by the University of Manchester.

== Other positions held ==
- President of the Manchester Cryptogamic Society

== Publications ==
- The Cryptogams (1862)
- Gleanings Amongst the Irish Cryptogams (1863)
- Notes on the Cyperaceae (1863)
