= William Bilbo =

American attorney, journalist, and entrepreneur (1822–1867)

- Born: William Nicholas Bilbo; 1822; Wilson County, Tennessee, U.S.
- Died: July 26, 1867 (aged 44–45); Nashville, Tennessee, U.S.
- Education: Lebanon Law School
- Occupations: Attorney; journalist; entrepreneur
- Spouse: Martha Jefferys (m. 1805)
- Children: 3
- Military career
- Allegiance: United States
- Conflicts: Second Seminole War

William Nicholas Bilbo (1822 – July 26, 1867) was an American attorney, journalist, and entrepreneur. He lived in Tennessee until 1864, when he moved north. Bilbo is best remembered for helping Secretary of State William H. Seward lobby for passage of a constitutional amendment banning slavery.

== Early life ==
Bilbo was born in 1822 in Wilson County, Tennessee. While studying at the Lebanon Law School he left to serve in the Florida War where he remained until the close of the campaign, upon which he returned to his legal studies.

== Career ==
Bilbo became a prosperous lawyer in Nashville, Tennessee, where he was among the leaders of the Know-Nothing Party. He also worked as a journalist with the Nashville Gazette, and was briefly the proprietor of the paper. Bilbo purchased a large amount of coal country, and persuaded a group of New York financiers to help establish a coal mining company in Tennessee, called the Sewanee Mining Company; Bilbo then sold his land to the company at a profit.

Bilbo was apparently a loyal member of the Confederacy until 1864, when he suddenly moved north. He knew Abraham Lincoln's Secretary of State (William H. Seward) from their days in the Whig Party.

=== Lobbyist for Thirteenth Amendment ===
Via Seward, Bilbo offered his lobbying services to Lincoln, on behalf of congressional approval for the Thirteenth Amendment, which ultimately banned slavery throughout the United States. With Seward's approval, Bilbo went to drum up support for the Amendment in New York. Bilbo told Seward: "I promised you the requisite votes, and neither energy, time or money shall be wanting on my part to attain our end..." Bilbo was arrested on suspicion of being a rebel spy, but Lincoln ordered his release. It is not clear that Bilbo succeeded in swaying many opinions regarding the pending amendment.

The lobbying group that Seward organized (the "Seward Lobby") doggedly pursued Democratic votes, using questionable, maybe even corrupt methods. Besides Bilbo, Seward's lobbying group included three other Democratic operatives: Emanuel B. Hart, Robert Latham, and George O. Jones, who all worked on New York congressmen for their support. Bilbo had some success with Congressman Homer A. Nelson, who ended up voting for the amendment. At the end of his congressional term, Nelson was offered a foreign post in appreciation for his support, but declined.

== Personal life ==
On August 31, 1805, Bilbo married Martha Jefferys with whom he had three children.

== Death and legacy ==
Bilbo died of dysentery and pneumonia on July 26, 1867, in Nashville, Tennessee and was interred at Mount Olivet Cemetery, Nashville, leaving behind his wife and children.

In the 2012 film Lincoln, the character of William Bilbo is portrayed by actor James Spader. No photos or portraits of Bilbo are known to exist.
