= Rodney Gladwell =

English painter

Rodney Gladwell (1928–1979) was a British artist born in Didcot, Oxfordshire, England whose paintings "hover between abstraction and figuration and play on this ambiguity".

Between 1949 and 1950, he followed in the foot steps of one of the greatest figurative painters of the 20th Century Amedeo Modigliani and studied in Paris at the Académie Colarossi. His work varied but a continual theme was his "heavily stylised female nudes". He exhibited in London and Paris with the Piccadilly Gallery, before being taken on by the gallery owner Lucy Wertheim and towards the end of his career the noted Swiss dealer Walter Feilchenfeldt.

In the 1960s, he undertook several large commissions to paint extensive murals for Sussex University (where he was later given a retrospective exhibition) and the Georgian Club in London. His work is held by the Arts Council of Great Britain and University of Johannesburg. In the 1970s, his work fell out of favour and he disappeared from the art scene.
