= Jack Bilbo =

German painter

The dust jacket of Jack Bilbo's 1948 autobiography

Jack Bilbo (born Hugo Cyril Kulp Baruch, 13 April 1907 –19 December 1967) was a German writer, art gallery owner, and self-taught painter.

== Life ==
Bilbo was born in Berlin, Germany in 1907. His parents owned a theatrical supply company. After the Nazis came to power he fled to France, Spain, and finally to England.

In 1941, Bilbo opened The Modern Art Gallery in London, exhibiting the work of Kurt Schwitters, Pablo Picasso, and his own paintings and drawings, as well as the work of many unknown artists.

Bilbo moved to Weybridge, England after the war ended and created large figurative sculptures in cement in his home's garden. They were entitled, Life, Devotion, and Sanctuary, and were destroyed when he left England in the early 1950s, moving to France with his wife Owo.

In 1948, he published Jack Bilbo: an Autobiography. The book is subtitled "The first forty years of the complete and intimate life-story of an Artist, Author, Sculptor, Art Dealer, Philosopher, Psychologist, Traveller and a Modernist Fighter for Humanity". In the same year he also closed the gallery.

He eventually returned to Berlin where he died in 1967.

== Painting style ==
In a 2014 review, art critic Gabriel Coxhead wrote that Bilbo's

drawings and paintings are technically naive and clunky, with the sort of straight-on or sideways views, segmented bodies and scribbled-in backgrounds you tend to see in children’s art. There’s something childlike, too, in the feeling of inventiveness and unselfconsciousness, with scenes that feature fantastic amalgams of monsters, robots, and other magical elements. Yet for all that, there’s also a sense of sophistication, as well as carnivalesque and absurdist humour – from in-jokes about cubism to his fetishistic obsession with women’s buttocks, which become weirdly transformed into all sorts of freaky faces and patterns.

== Exhibitions ==
- 1947 The Modern Art Gallery
- 1947 Museum of Modern Art, Weybridge, England
- 1988 England & Company Gallery (retrospective exhibition)
- 1990 England & Company Gallery ("Jack Bilbo & the Moderns: The Modern Art Gallery 1941-48")
- 2001 England & Company Gallery ("Obsessive Visions: Art Outside the Mainstream")
- 2014 David Zwirner Gallery ("Jack Bilbo")

== Bibliography ==
- Bilbo, Jack (1932). Carrying a Gun for Al Capone. London & New York: Putnam
- Bilbo, Jack (1937). I Can't Escape Adventure. Cresset Press
- Bilbo, Jack (1946)). Toulouse-Lautrec and Steinlen. London: The Modern Art Gallery
- Bilbo, Jack (1945). Pablo Picasso. Thirty Important Paintings from 1904 to 1943. London: The Modern Art Gallery
- Bilbo, Jack (1945). The Moderns. London: The Modern Art Gallery
- Bilbo, Jack (1946). Out of My Mind. London: The Modern Art Gallery
- Bilbo, Jack (1946). Famous Nudes by Famous Artists. London: The Modern Art Gallery
- Bilbo, Jack (1946). No Heaven - No Hell Human Conclusions. London: The Modern Art Gallery
- Bilbo, Jack (1948). Jack Bilbo: An Autobiography. London: The Modern Art Gallery

== See also ==
- Henry Stockley
