= Lucy Wertheim =

British gallery owner, collector and philanthropist

- Born: Lucy Carrington Pearson; 4 April 1883; Pendleton, Salford, UKGBI
- Died: 13 December 1971 (aged 88); Brighton, East Sussex, UK
- Occupations: Art collector; patron; gallerist
- Spouse: Mari Paul Johan Wertheim (m. 1906; died 1952)
- Children: 3
- Father: William Henry Pearson

Lucy Carrington Wertheim (née Pearson; 1883–1971) was an English art collector, patron and gallerist. Opening the Wertheim Gallery in 1930, Wertheim founded the "English artists in their twenties" art group and played a key role in promoting emerging British artists in the 1930s.

== Biography ==
Lucy Carrington Wertheim was born on 4 April 1883 in Pendleton to William Henry Pearson, a botanist and bryologist, and Annie Pearson. Wertheim was baptised on 17 June 1883 at Seedley Wesleyan Methodist Chapel.

Wertheim, with her husband, ran galleries in London, Brighton and Derbyshire and was known for encouraging many young artists and sculptors. In the 1920s she bought many works by Henry Moore and encouraged Cedric Morris.

In 1930, Wertheim opened her first gallery at 3-5 Burlington Gardens, Mayfair, London. It has been suggested that it was the artist Frances Hodgkins who finally persuaded or perhaps goaded Mrs Wertheim to move from enthusiastic supporter of 'modern art' to a fully fledged gallery owner. Wertheim recalls the incident in her 1947 book 'Adventure in Art' - "Frances exclaimed to my husband, 'Your wife should open a gallery for us poor artists: her enthusiasm would make it a success!'...Those words however spoken more than half in jest, sowed a seed in my mind that was to bear fruit later."

In the early 1960s she lent works to decorate the then-new and radical University of Sussex, near Brighton.

Those either exhibited at her gallery or supported by Wertheim included Walter Sickert, Rodney Gladwell, Humphrey Slater, Helmut Kolle, Vivin Hume, Phelan Gibb, John Bigge and John Banting, Henry Stockley, Nando Manetti, Rowland Suddaby, Leslie Hurry, Isla Rodmell, Kenneth Hall, Basil Rakoczi, John Melville, Feliks Topolski, Charles Higgins (Pic), David Burton, Cedric Morris, Alfred Wallis, Frances Hodgkins, Elizabeth Rivers, Mostyn Lewis, Jose Christopherson, David Gommon, Kathleen Walne, Maxwell Bates, and Christopher Wood amongst many others. Wertheim was Christopher Wood's main patron before his death.

== Personal life ==
In 1906, Wertheim married Mari Paul Johan Wertheim (1878–1952), a Dutch textile merchant who was later appointed the Dutch Consul in Manchester in 1931. Mari became a British citizen in 1915, and was later awarded the Order of Orange-Nassau for his services to Anglo-Dutch relations. Wertheim and Mari had three children.

On 13 December 1971 Wertheim died in Brighton aged 88.
