= Humphrey Slater =

British writer and painter (1906–1958)

- Born: Humphrey Richard Slater; 1906; Carlisle, U.K
- Died: 1958 (aged 51–52); La Línea de la Concepción, Spain

Humphrey Richard "Hugh" Slater (1906–1958) was an English author and painter.

Born in Carlisle, Cumberland in 1906, he spent his early childhood in South Africa, where his father served in Military Intelligence in Pretoria, before returning to England. He attended the Slade School of Art in the mid-1920s, and exhibited an abstract painting at Lucy Wertheim's gallery, a leading London gallery. Painter William Coldstream considered him "a very gifted and rare artist".

Getting involved in anti-Nazi politics in Berlin in the early 1930s, he joined the Communist Party of Great Britain. On the outbreak of Spanish Civil War in 1936 he went to Madrid as a war correspondent, returning the following year to join the International Brigade, where he became Chief of Operations.

Back in England, he helped Tom Wintringham set up the Osterley Park training centre in 1940 which taught guerilla warfare and street fighting for the Home Guard before being drafted into the regular army as a private. The public outcry led to questions being asked in Parliament and an article in the magazine Time. He was also editor of the short-lived magazine Polemic (1945–1947).

Slater wrote the historical novel The Heretics (1946). The Heretics had two parts: the first set in France during the Albigensian Crusade and the second part set in Spain during the Spanish Civil War. Slater drew a parallel in The Heretics between the persecution of the Albigensians in France and that of the Trotskyists in 1930s Spain.

The MGM film Conspirator (1949), starring Elizabeth Taylor and Robert Taylor, was based on his novel The Conspirator.

== Publications ==
- 1941: Home Guard for Victory! Gollancz
- 1946: The Heretics
- 1948: The Conspirator
- 1955: Who rules Russia? Batchworth Press (London)
- 1958: The Channel Tunnel A. Wingate (London)
- 2009: Los herejes, Spanish translation of The Heretics; Galaxia Gutenberg/Círculo de Lectores (Barcelona). Translated by Montserrat Gurguí and Hernán Sabaté.
- 2009: El conspirador, Spanish translation of The Conspirator; Galaxia Gutenberg/Círculo de Lectores (Barcelona). Translated by M. Gurguí and H. Sabaté.
