= Peter Stead (architect) =

Peter Stead (1922–1999) was an English architect. He was awarded by the Royal Institute of British Architects and given the Distinguished Flying Cross.

== Background ==
Stead's family had been engaged in building for several generations. In the early 1950s he and his firm Law Stead were engaged in constructing the modernist house designed by Peter Womersley at Farnley Hey. Later in the decade he worked with Stephen Gilbert on experimental construction designs.

Stead was a professor at Carnegie Mellon University in 1963-4.

During the 1970s Stead was a founder of the Centre for Alternatives in Urban Development and wrote a book on "Self-build housing groups and co-operatives: ideas in practice".

An archive of Stead's work is held by the Art Gallery in his home town, Huddersfield.
