= Ken Hope =

Irish cricketer

Cricket information
- Batting: Right-handed
- Bowling: Off spin

International information
- National side: Ireland

Career statistics
Competition	First-class
Matches	9
Runs scored	75
Batting average	6.81
100s/50s	0/0
Top score	21
Balls bowled	958
Wickets	12
Bowling average	28.25
5 wickets in innings	1
10 wickets in match	0
Best bowling	6/59
Catches/stumpings	5/–
- Source: CricketArchive, 16 November 2022

Kenneth William Hope (born 3 May 1939) is an Irish former cricketer. A right-handed batsman and off spin bowler, he played thirteen times for the Ireland cricket team between 1958 and 1966 including nine first-class matches.

== Playing career ==
Hope first played for Ireland in July 1958 against Scotland in a first-class match at the age of 19. He had a poor debut, scoring five not out and taking 0/13. His second match, against the MCC in September the same year was even worse, with the same match bowling figures and scoring just one run in the match.

Despite this poor start to his career he played five times for Ireland in 1959, playing against Scotland, Lancashire, Yorkshire, Leicestershire and the MCC. He played three times in 1960, against Scotland, Leicestershire and the MCC, and twice in 1961 against Leicestershire and Scotland. He did not play again for Ireland until September 1966, when he returned for one final match, against the MCC.

== Statistics ==
In all matches for Ireland, he scored 98 runs at an average of 6.53, with a highest score of 21 against the MCC in September 1960. He took 26 wickets at an average of 21.35, with best bowling figures of 6/59 against Scotland in June 1960, the only time he took five wickets in an innings. In first-class cricket, he scored 75 runs at an average of 6.81 and took twelve wickets at an average of 28.25.
