= Alice Hanratty =

Irish artist (1939–2025)

Alice Hanratty (1939 – 13 May 2025) was an Irish artist who specialised in printmaking, especially involving etching.

== Life ==
Alice Hanratty was born in Dublin in 1939. She studied painting and printmaking at the National College of Art and Design, Dublin, and the Hornsey College of Art, London. She spent some time working in East Africa in the late 1960s, which had some influence on her work.

She was a member of Aosdána, the academy or affiliation of Irish artists and was for a time, a member of its governing body, the Toscaireacht.

As well as exhibiting work in major Irish group shows, she represented Ireland at exhibitions such as the International Impact Exhibition, Kyoto in 1989; the Works on Paper Group Exhibition at the Armory, New York in 1992; the London Original Print Fair, Royal Academy of Arts, in 1995; the International Biennale of Print, Beograd in 1998; and the Estampe International Print Exchange, Paris, in 2001. Her work was also included in group shows at home and abroad, including ‘The Delighted Eye’ in London (1979); ‘Irish Artists’ in Chicago (1980); ‘Irish Women Artists from the Eighteenth Century to the Present Day’ in Dublin (1987); ‘International Impact Exhibition’ in Kyoto (1989); ‘London Original Print Fair’ at the Royal Academy of Arts (1995); and the Estampe International Print Exchange’ in Paris (2001).

Hanratty died on 13 May 2025.

== Works in collections ==
Her work is held in several major collections, including those of Trinity College Dublin, the Arts Council of Ireland and the Arts Council of Northern Ireland.
