= Joe Gaffney =

British photographer

Joe Gaffney is a British photographer who captured the images of figures from 1970s London before moving on to fashion photography with French Vogue. His portraits of Francois Truffaut, Salvador Dalí, Man Ray, Audrey Hepburn and Dennis Hopper among others earned him recognition by the Louvre's Musee des Arts Decoratifs, in Paris. In 1985 Gaffney moved to New York and resumed his painting career in addition to his portrait work. His photographic work is in the collections of the British National Portrait Gallery, Louvre Musee des Arts Decoratifs (MAD Paris) as well as private collections, including Nancy Rutter Clark, Sir Paul Smith and Sir Elton John.

== London ==
Trained in art school as a painter, Gaffney switched to photography in the early seventies. He studied photography at the Royal College of Art in London. And while there, Gaffney began to develop a career as a portrait photographer. Between 1971 and 1973, he was shooting regularly for Andy Warhol's Interview Magazine photographing stars like Marianne Faithfull and Serge Gainsbourg. Among his other portraits are Cecil Beaton, Jean Muir, Spike Milligan (1974) and Man Ray (Paris, 1975), all of which are in the National Portrait Gallery.

== Paris ==
Gaffney moved to Paris permanently in 1975. While shooting a campaign for Vichy Celestins featuring the chef Paul Bocuse, Gaffney was introduced to French Vogue by designer Zandra Rhodes. The first portrait that Gaffney did for them was of François Truffaut in 1977 for French Vogue. It was noticed by editor in chief Francine Cresent who approached him to do a fashion shoot with the model Shaun Casey. This started his editorial career with French Vogue shooting fashion, still life, beauty, and celebrity portraits. Gaffney also shot for British Vogue, Italian Vogue, Harper’s Bazaar, Elle, and Interview.

Gaffney shot ad campaigns for Cartier, Givenchy, Helena Rubenstein, Revillon, Jean Claude de Luca, Georges Rech and two campaigns for Thierry Mugler. He also shot Yves Saint Laurent and Paloma Picasso. His portraits ranged from Roman Polanski, Dennis Hopper, Audrey Hepburn, Raquel Welch, Andie Macdowell and a host of other celebrated figures. The Musée du Louvre chose him as one of the fashion photographers to shoot in the shell of the building that would become the new Musée des Arts Decoratifs (MAD).

His work from that period has been featured in many exhibitions and their catalogs, including at the Louvre MAD 'HIstoires de Photographie', 'Annees 80 - Mode, Design et Graphisme en France', and Thierry Mugler 'Couturissime' a traveling exhibition which has also been seen in Montreal, and in New York at the Brooklyn Museum.

== Later career ==
Gaffney and his wife, fashion designer Ann Ogden, moved to New York in 1985. He became increasingly interested in abstract painting, and by the early '90s had virtually abandoned photography altogether. This changed when by chance the actress Kathleen Turner saw his photographic work and commissioned a portrait of herself. Turner encouraged him not to give up photography. He once again found himself behind the camera, this time a digital camera. For an artist with such a strong eye and vision, digital photography opened up a whole new world of creative possibilities for Gaffney. He started to shoot portraits again, including Debbie Harry, Julia Garner, Karlie Kloss, Iman, David Johansen and The New York Dolls. Fashion photography came back into Gaffney's life when he was approached by the designer Andre Walker. Walker had loved his Paris work and persuaded him to shoot fashion again for the UK magazine Dazed & Confused. Walker and Gaffney collaborated again on several shoots for 10 magazine and for Walker's Tiwimuta Vol 1 the Inaugural edition.
