= Phelan Gibb =

English painter

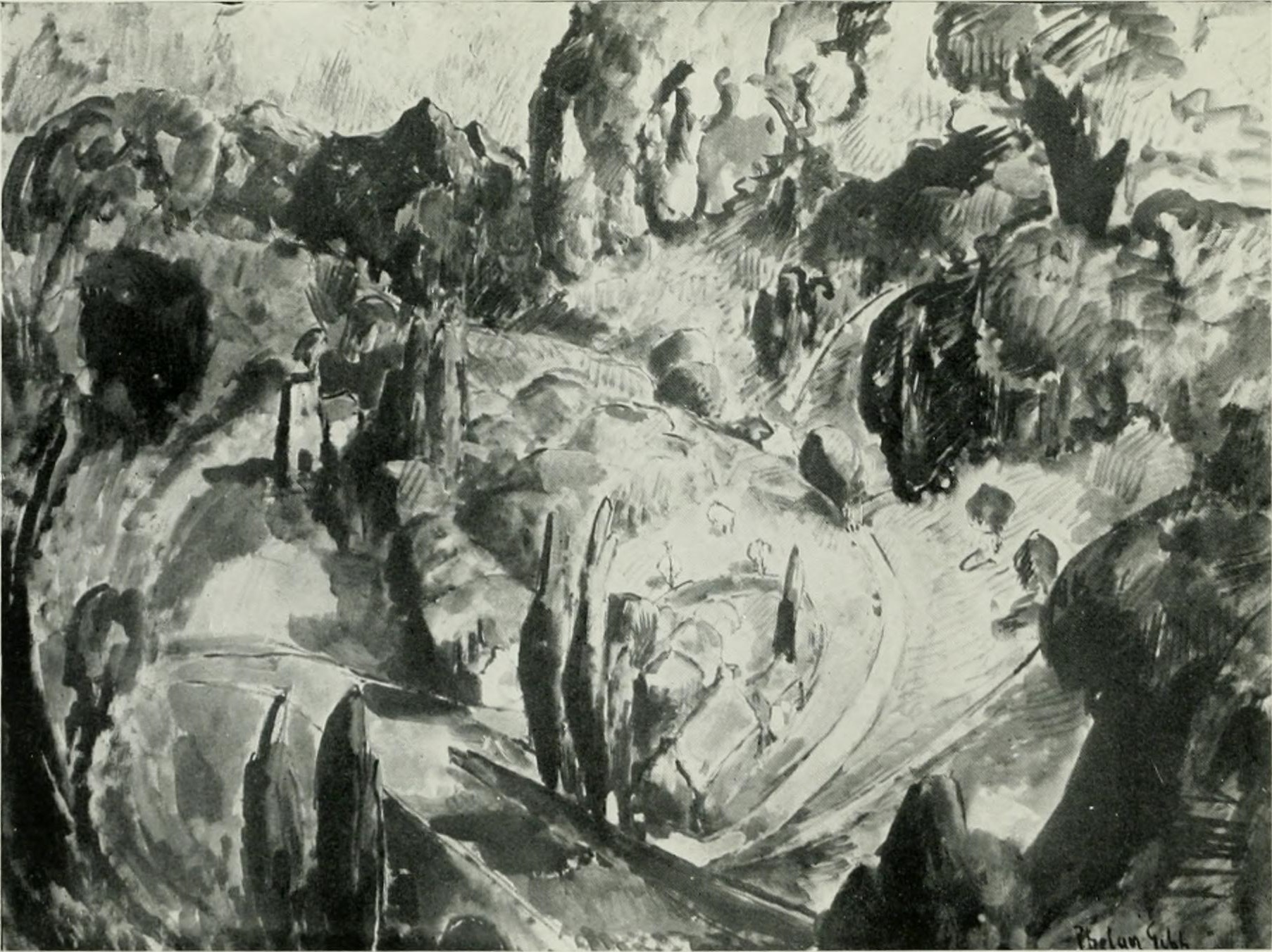
A landscape study by Phelan Gibb

Harry Phelan Gibb (a.k.a. William Phelan "Harry" Gibb) (1870–1948) was a British artist influenced by the work of Paul Cézanne, who exhibited in London, Paris and New York.

Born in Alnwick, Northumberland, he studied at Newcastle, Edinburgh, Antwerp, and Munich before arriving in Paris, where he studied under Jean-Paul Laurens and where he lived for twenty-five years. His style has been described as "earthy" and naive, and was highly thought of by Roger Fry, Gertrude Stein, and Lucy Wertheim.

Wertheim indeed enthused about him in her 1947 book Adventure in Art – "The English artist still living whose work probably is of the most permanent value is Phelan Gibb. One day Phelan Gibb will doubtless come into his own, and his finest paintings take their place alongside examples of Manet, Cézanne, Picasso, Kolle and Christopher Wood, in international exhibitions of Modern Art".

Emily Carr studied with Gibb in 1910–1911 in Paris, and it was during this association that Carr began experimenting with perspective, scale and colour, rather than remaining faithful to literal representations of natural forms.

Gibbs' work was shown at the 1913 International Exhibition of Modern Art organised by the Armory Show American Association of Painters and Sculptors in New York City, and his watercolour 'Belgrave Square and Wilton Crescent' (1928) is held by the Tate.
