= Basil Rákóczi =

British artist (1908–1976)

- Born: Benjamin Dobbey Wilce; 31 May 1908; Chelsea, London, UKGBI
- Died: 21 March 1979 (aged 70); London, UK
- Other names: Benjamin Beaumont; Benny Beaumont; Basil Ivan Rákóczi
- Education: Brighton School of Art; Académie de la Grande Chaumière
- Occupations: Artist; painter; stage designer; illustrator; writer
- Known for: Co-founder of The White Stag group
- Movement: Irish Modernism
- Spouse: Kathleen Mather (m. 1930; div. 1938)
- Children: 1

Basil Rákóczi (né Benjamin Dobbey Wilce; 31 May 1908 – 21 March 1979) was a British artisit, painter, stage designer, illustrator and writer, known for co-founding the Irish The White Stag art group with Kenneth Hall.

== Early life and education ==
Benjamin Dobbey Wilce was born on 31 May 1908 in Chelsea, London to Ivan Rákóczi, a Hungarian composer, violinist, and artist, and Charlotte May Dobbey (known as Dolly Wilce; 1883–1951), an art model. Rákóczi's mother was born in Woolwich (Note: Alternatively cited as County Cork.) to an English father and an Irish mother.

Rákóczi's parents were not legally married, having supposedly married in a Romani ceremony, and did not live together. Rákóczi did not know his father, and his mother maintained that Rákóczi's father was an 'artist, musician and philosopher or yogi of Hungarian descent, who mostly lived in Paris'.

Following his mother's marriage to the Rev Harold Beaumont in 1911, Rákóczi was known as 'Benjamin Beaumont'. Rákóczi had one maternal half brother, and spent time in France as a child. In the early 1910s the Beaumont family moved to Brighton, where Rákóczi was educated at the Jesuit College of St Francis before attending the Brighton School of Art (present-day, University of Brighton School of Art). In 1925, Rákóczi moved to Paris and studied at the Académie de la Grande Chaumière. Rákóczi later studied under Ossip Zadkine.

== Career ==
Rákóczi returned to London in the late 1920s, and worked as a commercial artist and stage designer. In 1932, following the break down of his marriage, Rákóczi acquired a studio on Fitzroy Street, Fitzrovia and developed an interest in psychology and painting. In 1933, Rákóczi meet Herbrand Ingouville-Williams.

In May 1935, Rákóczi co-founded the Society for Creative Psychology with Herbrand Ingouville-Williams. Rákóczi met Kenneth Hall at a Society for Creative Psychology meeting and founded The White Stag Group the same year. The aim of The White Stag Group was the promotion of the advancement of subjectivity in psychological analysis and art.

During 1971–1972, Rákóczi worked in Brittany.

=== Style ===
His style varies greatly as he believed to explore psychological aspects of his work. A great many of his friends and contemporaries relied on psychology as a means of art and a number of his friends were members of the Society of Creative Psychology. As a result, his painting have a very modernist yet unique style that is only repeated within the group he formed and ran, The White Stag. He primarily used oil and gouache as a medium but frequently worked with monotype and watercolour and ceramics for tile designs.

=== Exhibitions and public collections ===
During the 1930s Rákóczi exhibited with Lucy Wertheim. Rákóczi exhibited under the name 'Benny Beaumont' until he changed his name by deed poll to 'Basil Ivan Rákóczi' in 1938. Rákóczi potentially began informally using the name 'Basil Rákóczi' as early as 1933.

Basil Rákóczi's work has featured in over 150 exhibitions, of which more than 60 have been solo shows. His first commercial exhibition was in 1935 at the Artificer's Guild in Cambridge and throughout his life, he had regular exhibitions at the Irish Museum of Living Art, the Royal Hibernian Academy and the Watercolour Society of Ireland.

In 2005, Rákóczi's paintings were displayed along other members of The White Stag group at the Irish Museum of Modern Art.

He has art works in public collections across the globe including the University of Sussex, Derby City Art Gallery, Manchester City Art Gallery, Dublin's Trinity College, the Ulster Museum in Belfast, the Queensland Australia National Collection and Auckland City Art Gallery.

== Personal life ==
In 1930, Rákóczi married Kathleen Mather (Note: Also cited as Natacha Mather.) in Brighton, with whom he had one son. Rákóczi and Mather separated in 1932 and officially divorced in 1938.

On 21 March 1979 Rákóczi died in London aged 70. Rákóczi wrote an autobiography which remains unpublished.

== Publications ==
- Rákóczi, Basil Ivan (1953). Song book of idiot boy. Paris: Éditions du Cerf.
- Rákóczi, Basil Ivan (1954). The Painted Caravan: A Penetration Into the Secrets of the Tarot Cards. The Hague: L.J.C. Boucher.
- Rákóczi, Basil Ivan (1955). En cage et en liberté – The cage and the free. Translated by Bernard Citroen̈. Paris.
- Rákóczi, Basil Ivan (1970). Fortune Telling: A Guide to Foreseeing the Future. Macdonald & Company. ISBN 9780356034652.
