= Patrick Scott (artist) =

Irish artist (1921–2014)

- Untitled, 2009, carborundum with gold leaf, 110 x 110 cm
- Born: 24 January 1921; Kilbrittain, County Cork, Ireland
- Died: 14 February 2014 (aged 93); Ballsbridge, Dublin, Ireland
- Education: University College Dublin (studied architecture)
- Known for: Painting, Tapestry, Printmaking, Sculpture

Patrick Scott (24 January 1921 – 14 February 2014) was an Irish artist.

Patrick Scott was born in Kilbrittain, County Cork, in 1921, and had his first exhibition in 1944, but trained as an architect and did not become a full-time artist until 1960. He worked for fifteen years for the Irish architect Michael Scott, assisting, for example, in the design of Busáras, the central bus station in Dublin. He was also responsible for the black and orange livery of Irish intercity trains.

Scott was perhaps best known for his gold paintings, abstracts incorporating geometrical forms in gold leaf against a pale tempura background. He also produced tapestries and carpets.

His paintings are in several important collections including the Museum of Modern Art in New York. He won the Guggenheim Award in 1960, represented Ireland in the 1960 Venice Biennale, the Douglas Hyde Gallery held a major retrospective of his work in 1981 and the Hugh Lane Gallery in Dublin held a major survey in 2002. His works are distinguished by their purity and sense of calm, reflecting his interest in Zen Buddhism.

In October 2013, Scott wed his companion of 30 years, Eric Pearce, in a civil ceremony at the Dublin Registry Office.

On 11 July 2007, Scott, who was a founding member of Aosdána, was conferred with the title of Saoi, the highest honour that can be bestowed upon an Irish artist. The President of Ireland, Mary McAleese, made the presentation, placing a gold torc, the symbol of the office of Saoi, around his neck. No more than seven living members may hold this honour at any one time.

Scott died on 14 February 2014 at the age of 93. He was survived by his partner.

In January 2021 An Post issued a special stamp featuring Scott's work for the centenary of his birth.

== Work in collections ==
- Dublin City University:
  - Sea Foam
- Hugh Lane Municipal Gallery of Modern Art, Dublin
- Gulf Oil Corporation, Pittsburg
- Ulster Museum, Belfast
- The Museum of Modern Art, New York
- Irish Museum of Modern Art, Dublin
- Trinity College, Dublin
- National University of Ireland, Galway
