= 1779 in Ireland =

- Centuries: 16th; 17th; 18th; 19th; 20th
- Decades: 1750s; 1760s; 1770s; 1780s; 1790s
- See also: Other events of 1779; List of years in Ireland

Events from the year 1779 in Ireland.

== Incumbent ==
- Monarch: George III

== Events ==
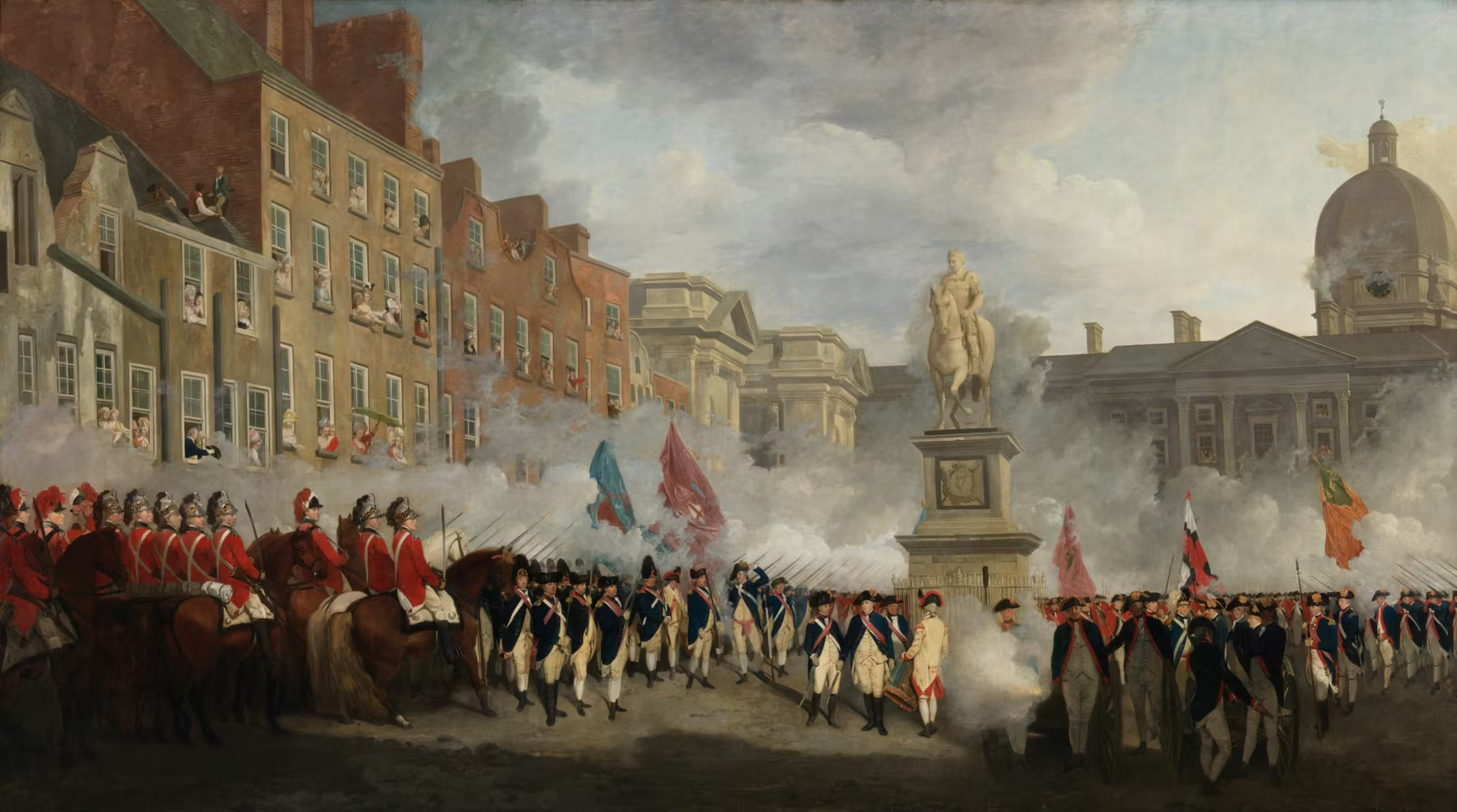
The Dublin Volunteers on College Green by Francis Wheatley

- Armed Volunteers demonstrate in Dublin for free trade between Ireland and England. This demand for amendment of the Navigation Acts is quickly granted by the British government.
- Grand Canal opens to traffic between Dublin and Sallins.
- Spike Island, County Cork, is acquired by the government to form part of the defences of Cork Harbour.
- New Church of Ireland Christ Church Cathedral, Waterford, completed.

== Births ==
- 22 January – Charles O'Neill, 1st Earl O'Neill, landowner and politician (died 1841).
- February – Richard Carmichael, surgeon (died 1849).
- 30 March – Antoine Ó Raifteirí, "last of the wandering bards" (died 1835).
- 16 April – Patrick Kelly, Roman Catholic Bishop of Waterford and Lismore (died 1829).
- 28 May – Thomas Moore, poet, singer, songwriter and entertainer (died 1852).
- 17 August – William Corbet, member of the United Irishmen, soldier, Commander-in-Chief of French forces in Greece (died 1842).
- 3 November – Hugh Gough, 1st Viscount Gough, British Field Marshal (died 1869).
- Arthur Brooke Faulkner, physician and writer (died 1845).
- John Oldham, mechanical engineer (died 1840).
- Thomas Ussher, Royal Navy officer (died 1848).
- Possible date – Julia Glover née Betterton, comic actress (died 1850).

== Deaths ==
- April – Anthony Foster, lawyer and politician (born 1705).
- 18 October – Patrick d'Arcy, mathematical physicist and soldier in France (born 1725).
- 10 December – Thomas Fortescue, politician (born 1744).
- Risteárd Buidhe Kirwan, soldier and duellist (died 1708).
- Thomas Newburgh, poet (born c.1695).
- Thomas Tennison, lawyer and politician (born 1707).
