= 1768 in Ireland =

- Centuries: 16th; 17th; 18th; 19th; 20th
- Decades: 1740s; 1750s; 1760s; 1770s; 1780s
- See also: Other events of 1768; List of years in Ireland

Events from the year 1768 in Ireland.

== Incumbent ==
- Monarch: George III

== Events ==
- 18 February – The Hon. Frederick Augustus Hervey, later 4th Earl of Bristol, is appointed Church of Ireland Bishop of Derry (being translated from Cloyne), an office he will hold until his death in 1803.
- 16 July – The Loftus Baronetcy, of Mount Loftus in the County of Kilkenny, is created in the Baronetage of Ireland for Edward Loftus.
- Poolbeg Lighthouse in Dublin Bay is first lit (by candlepower).
- The Ladies of Llangollen meet for the first time.
- Bishop John O'Brien's Irish-English dictionary, Focaloir Gaoidhilge-Sacs-Bhéarla, is published posthumously and anonymously in Paris.

== Births ==
- 22 March – Melesina Trench (née Chenevix), writer (died 1827).
- 8 April – Sir Frederick Falkiner, 1st Baronet, politician (died 1824).
- 7 May – Alexander Arbuthnot, Church of Ireland Bishop of Killaloe (died 1828).
- 9 May – Nathaniel Clements, 2nd Earl of Leitrim, nobleman and Whig MP (died 1854).
- 11 July – Joseph O'Lawlor, soldier in the service of Spain (died 1850).
- Undated
  - John Milner Barry, physician (died 1822).
  - Edward Donovan, writer, traveller and amateur zoologist (died 1837).
  - Daniel Murray, Roman Catholic Archbishop of Dublin (died 1852).
- Approximate date
  - John Brenan, physician (died 1830).
  - James McClelland, Solicitor-General for Ireland (died 1831).

== Deaths ==
- 3 March – Richard Mounteney, judge and classical scholar (born 1707).
- 18 March – Rev. Laurence Sterne, novelist (born 1713).
- 11 September – William Francis Crosbie, politician.
- Thomas Drennan, reforming Presbyterian minister (born 1696).
- Richard Trench, politician (born 1710).
