= 1765 in Ireland =

- Centuries: 16th; 17th; 18th; 19th; 20th
- Decades: 1740s; 1750s; 1760s; 1770s; 1780s
- See also: Other events of 1765; List of years in Ireland

Events from the year 1765 in Ireland.

== Incumbent ==
- Monarch: George III

== Events ==
- Coercion Act against the Whiteboys.
- First Magdalene asylum (for Protestant girls) in Ireland opens on Leeson Street in Dublin, founded by Lady Arabella Denny.
- Gracehill established in County Antrim as a Moravian community.

== Arts and literature ==
- Sculptor Christopher Hewetson settles in Rome.

== Births ==
- 14 January – George Knox, politician (died 1827).
- 13 April – Thomas Wallace, politician (died 1847).
- 19 July – George Beresford, Church of Ireland Bishop of Kilmore (died 1841).
- 6 December – Edward O'Reilly, scholar (died 1830).
- 29 December - Laurence Hynes Halloran, alleged criminal deported to Australia
- Robert Holmes, barrister and nationalist (died 1859).
- Samuel Turner, barrister and informer (killed 1807).
- Approximate date – Charles Bourke, priest (died 1820).

== Deaths ==
- 24 November – William Dunkin, poet (born c.1709).
- 26 November – Sir Edward O'Brien, 2nd Baronet, politician (born 1705).
- 29 December – John Alexander, minister and writer (born 1736).
- 31 December – Samuel Madden, clergyman, writer and benefactor (born 1686).
