= 1844 in Ireland =

- Centuries: 17th; 18th; 19th; 20th; 21st
- Decades: 1820s; 1830s; 1840s; 1850s; 1860s
- See also: 1844 in the United Kingdom; Other events of 1844; List of years in Ireland

Events from the year 1844 in Ireland.

== Events ==
- 29 March – official opening of the Dalkey Atmospheric Railway.
- 14 December – meeting to establish the first branch of the Society of Saint Vincent de Paul in Ireland chaired by Bartholomew Woodlock.
- 15 December – Saint Malachy's Church, Belfast is dedicated by Dr William Crolly, Archbishop of Armagh and Primate of All Ireland.
- Dublin iron-founder Richard Turner begins assembling components for the Palm house at Kew Gardens in London, the first large-scale structural use of wrought iron.
- Irish physician Francis Rynd utilises a hollow hypodermic needle to make the first recorded subcutaneous injections, specifically of a sedative to treat neuralgia.

== Arts and literature ==
- 13 July – Thomas Davis's nationalist ballad A Nation Once Again is first published, in his newspaper The Nation.
- Joseph Patrick Haverty paints Patrick O'Brien: The Limerick Piper and his brother Martin Haverty publishes Wanderings in Spain in 1843.
- Charles Lever's novel Arthur O'Leary: His wanderings and ponderings in many lands is published in book form in London.

== Births ==
- 3 February – James Henry Reynolds, recipient of the Victoria Cross for gallantry in 1879 at Rorke's Drift, South Africa (died 1932).
- 8 February – Joseph Ivess, member of the New Zealand House of Representatives (died 1919 in New Zealand).
- 20 February – James Rankin, lighthouse keeper in America (died 1921 in the United States).
- 12 March – Patrick Collins, U.S. Representative from Massachusetts and Mayor of Boston (died 1905 in the United States).
- 5 June – Thomas Cleeve, founder of Condensed Milk Company of Ireland, High Sheriff of Limerick (died 1908).
- 15 June – Charlotte Despard, suffragist, novelist and Sinn Féin activist (died 1939).
- 28 June – John Boyle O'Reilly, poet and novelist (died 1890).
- 7 July – George W. Joy, painter (died 1925).
- 1 August – Daniel John O'Donoghue, printer, labour leader and politician in Ontario (died 1907 in Canada).
- 9 August – John Sweetman, politician, one of founders of Sinn Féin and second President of the party in 1908 (died 1936).
- 6 November – Robert Browne, Roman Catholic Bishop of the Diocese of Cloyne (died 1935).
- 10 November – Dr. Mark F. Ryan, nationalist and author (died 1940).
- 21 November – William Martin Murphy, Nationalist (Irish Parliamentary Party) MP, newspaper proprietor, leader of employer's syndicate in the Dublin Lockout of 1913 (died 1919).
- 13 December – John Atkinson, Baron Atkinson, politician and judge, Attorney-General for Ireland and Law Lord (died 1932).
- Full date unknown – James McParland, Pinkerton detective agent (died 1919 in the United States).

== Deaths ==
- 8 January – William Warren Baldwin, doctor, businessman, lawyer, judge, architect and political figure in Upper Canada (born 1775).
- 10 January – Hudson Lowe, British military leader (born 1769).
- 13 January – Alexander Porter, United States Senator for Louisiana (born 1785).
- 20 February – Edward Kernan, Bishop of Clogher, 1824–1844 (born 1771).
- 26 August – John Keane, 1st Baron Keane, British Army Lieutenant-General (born 1781).
- 29 August – Edmund Ignatius Rice, Roman Catholic missionary and educationalist, founder of the Congregation of Christian Brothers and the Presentation Brothers (born 1762).

== See also ==
- 1844 in Scotland
- 1844 in Wales
