= 1771 in Ireland =

- Centuries: 16th; 17th; 18th; 19th; 20th
- Decades: 1750s; 1760s; 1770s; 1780s; 1790s
- See also: Other events of 1771; List of years in Ireland

Events from the year 1771 in Ireland.

== Incumbent ==
- Monarch: George III

== Events ==
- 7 August – foundation stone of Clifton House, Belfast, the Belfast Charitable Society's poorhouse, is laid.
- October – Achmet Borumborad, con-artist, opens a Turkish Baths on Bachelor's Quay (modern day Bachelor's Walk), Dublin.
- The first of the Roman Catholic relief bills passes into law, permitting Catholics to reclaim and hold under lease for sixty-one years 50 acres (20 ha) of bog if more than a mile of any city or market town.
- Archbishop Richard Robinson founds the Armagh Public Library.
- William James of Bailieborough emigrates to the Thirteen Colonies of North America where he will make a great fortune in Albany, New York, and become father of Henry James Sr.

== Births ==
- 19 July – Thomas Talbot, soldier and politician in Upper Canada (died 1853).
- 26 October – Juan Mackenna, soldier in Chile (died 1814).
- William Homan, only Dunlum Baronet (died 1852).
- Edward Jordan, rebel, fisherman and pirate in Nova Scotia (executed 1809).
- Edward Kernan, Roman Catholic Bishop of Clogher from 1824 (died 1844).
- Philip Nolan, horse-trader and freebooter (killed 1801 in the United States).
- Approximate date
  - Elizabeth Rebecca Edwin née Richards, actress (died 1854).
  - James Bardin Palmer, land agent, lawyer and politician in Prince Edward Island (died 1833).

== Deaths ==
- 24 September – Arthur Jones-Nevill, Surveyor General of Ireland and politician (born c.1712).
- 4 November – Charles Lucas, apothecary, physician and radical politician (born 1713).
- 25 November – Sir Richard Butler, 5th Baronet, politician (born 1699).
- 18 December – James O'Brien, politician (born 1701?).
