= 1764 in Ireland =

- Centuries: 16th; 17th; 18th; 19th; 20th
- Decades: 1740s; 1750s; 1760s; 1770s; 1780s
- See also: Other events of 1764; List of years in Ireland

Events from the year 1764 in Ireland.

== Incumbent ==
- Monarch: George III

== Events ==
- 3 January – the Brooke Baronetcy, of Colebrooke in the County of Fermanagh, is created in the Baronetage of Ireland for Arthur Brooke, a member of the Irish House of Commons.
- Old Moore's Almanac first published by Theophilus Moore of Milltown, Dublin.

== Arts and literature ==
- The English-born painter William Ashford arrives in Dublin; he will spend most of the rest of his life in Ireland.

== Births ==
- 15 February – Charles MacCarthy, soldier in the French, Dutch and British armies, governor in British West Africa (died 1824).
- 24 April – Thomas Addis Emmet, lawyer, politician and United Irishman (died 1827 in the United States).
- 1 June – Marcus Beresford, soldier and politician (died 1803).
- 30 June – Charles Bury, 1st Earl of Charleville, politician (died 1835).
- 21 August – Joseph Rogers, settler in the United States (died 1833).
- 25 August – James Hope, a leader of the United Irishmen in the Irish Rebellion of 1798 and insurrection of 1803 (died 1847).
- 25 November – Henry Charles Sirr, soldier (died 1841).
- Arthur French, politician (died 1820).
- Charles O'Conor, priest and scholar (died 1828).

== Deaths ==
- 16 April – Warden Flood, judge (born 1694).
- 19 December – George Stone, Archbishop of Armagh (Church of Ireland) (born 1708).
