= 1767 in Ireland =

- Centuries: 16th; 17th; 18th; 19th; 20th
- Decades: 1740s; 1750s; 1760s; 1770s; 1780s
- See also: Other events of 1767; List of years in Ireland

Events from the year 1767 in Ireland.

== Incumbent ==
- Monarch: George III

== Events ==
- 20 July – Arthur Chichester, 5th Earl of Donegall, grants new leases for most of his property holdings in Belfast, obliging tenants to redevelop.
- 19 August – Viscount Townshend appointed Lord Lieutenant of Ireland (sworn 14 October).
- The titles Earl of Howth and Viscount St Lawrence are created in the Peerage of Ireland in favour of Thomas St Lawrence, 15th Baron Howth.
- A Magdalen Asylum was established by Lady Arabella Denny in Leeson Street, for Protestant women.

== Arts and literature ==
- Hugh Kelly's novel Memoirs of a Magdalen is published.
- John O'Keeffe's first play, The She Gallant, is performed at the Smock Alley Theatre in Dublin.

== Births ==
- 1 January – Maria Edgeworth, novelist (died 1849).
- 14 March – Charles Arbuthnot, Tory politician and member of the Privy Council (died 1850).
- 19 May – Richard Trench, 2nd Earl of Clancarty, diplomat, Irish, and later British, MP (died 1837).
- 31 August – Henry Joy McCracken, cotton manufacturer and industrialist, Presbyterian and a founding member of the Society of the United Irishmen (died 1798).
- 21 November – Thomas Russell, co-founder and leader of the United Irishmen, executed for his part in Robert Emmet's rebellion (died 1803).
  Full date unknown
  - John Moore, participant in Irish Rebellion of 1798, proclaimed President of the Government of the Province of Connaught (died 1799).

== Deaths ==
- 30 November – John Cole, 1st Baron Mountflorence, politician (born 1709).
