= 1776 in Ireland =

- Centuries: 16th; 17th; 18th; 19th; 20th
- Decades: 1750s; 1760s; 1770s; 1780s; 1790s
- See also: Other events of 1776; List of years in Ireland

Events from the year 1776 in Ireland.

== Incumbent ==
- Monarch: George III

== Events ==
- 3 February – proclamation imposing an embargo on export of provisions from Ireland to secure supplies for the British Army fighting in the American Revolutionary War.
- 4 April – act of the Parliament of Ireland to prevent "tumultuous risings", directed against the Whiteboys.
- 4 July – United States Declaration of Independence signed in Philadelphia. Eight of the signatories are Irish American, three (Matthew Thornton, George Taylor and James Smith) having been born in Ireland. This night, Strabane-born John Dunlap prints copies at his shop in the city.

== Births ==
- 3 July – Henry Parnell, 1st Baron Congleton, politician. (died 1842).
- 1 August – Archibald Acheson, 2nd Earl of Gosford, MP, Lieutenant-Governor of Lower Canada and Governor General of British North America (died 1849).
- 11 September – Thomas Arbuthnot, British military officer (died 1849).
- 1 October – Augustus Warren Baldwin, naval officer and political figure in Upper Canada (died 1866).

== Deaths ==
- 25 September – Thomas Burke, Roman Catholic Bishop of Ossory (born c.1709).
