= 1842 in Ireland =

- Centuries: 17th; 18th; 19th; 20th; 21st
- Decades: 1820s; 1830s; 1840s; 1850s; 1860s
- See also: 1842 in the United Kingdom; Other events of 1842; List of years in Ireland

Events from the year 1842 in Ireland.

== Events ==
- 15 October – The Nation newspaper is founded in Dublin.

== Births ==
- 6 February – Jeremiah O'Sullivan, Roman Catholic Bishop of Mobile (died 1896).
- 10 February – Agnes Mary Clerke, astronomer and writer (died 1907).
- 9 May – William Hone, cricketer (died 1919).
- 23 August – Osborne Reynolds, engineer and prominent innovator in the understanding of fluid dynamics (died 1912).
- 3 September – John Devoy, Fenian organiser and exile (died 1928 in the United States).

== Deaths ==
- 25 March – William Beatty, ship's surgeon on HMS Victory during the Battle of Trafalgar (born 1773).
- 11 April – John England, first Catholic Bishop of Charleston, South Carolina (born 1786).
- 8 June – Henry Parnell, 1st Baron Congleton, politician. (born 1776).
- 12 August – William Corbet, member of the United Irishmen, soldier, Commander-in-Chief to French forces in Greece (born 1779).
- 21 August – William Maginn, journalist and writer (born 1794).
- 30 August – John Banim, dramatist and playwright (born 1798).
- 28 September – Sir Michael O'Loghlen, 1st Baronet, judge, politician and Attorney-General for Ireland (born 1789).
- 4 October – Lowry Cole, soldier, politician and MP for Enniskillen from 1797 to 1800, Governor of Mauritius and Cape Colony (born 1772).

== See also ==
- 1842 in Scotland
- 1842 in Wales
