= 1769 in Ireland =

- Centuries: 16th; 17th; 18th; 19th; 20th
- Decades: 1740s; 1750s; 1760s; 1770s; 1780s
- See also: Other events of 1769; List of years in Ireland

Events from the year 1769 in Ireland.

== Incumbent ==
- Monarch: George III

== Events ==
- 15 July – the Royal Hibernian Military School, founded in Dublin to educate orphaned children of members of the British armed forces in Ireland, is granted its Royal charter.
- November – River Shannon made navigable from Killaloe (Lough Derg) to Roosky above Lough Ree.

== Births ==
- 1 May – the Hon. Arthur Wesley, later Arthur Wellesley, 1st Duke of Wellington, soldier and statesman (died 1852).
- May – Nicholas Tuite MacCarthy, Jesuit preacher (died 1833).
- 18 June – Robert Stewart, Viscount Castlereagh, politician, represented the United Kingdom at the Congress of Vienna (died 1822).
- 28 July – Hudson Lowe, British military leader (died 1844).
- 23 December – Martin Archer Shee, painter (died 1850).
- Approximate date – Gorges Lowther, politician (died 1854).

== Deaths ==
- 23 January – Thomas Fortescue, politician (born 1683).
- 19 September – Robert MacCarty, Viscount Muskerry, Royal Navy officer (born 1698).
- 20 November – Charles Gardiner, landowner and politician (born 1720).
- James Daly, politician (born c.1716).
