= 1843 in Ireland =

- Centuries: 17th; 18th; 19th; 20th; 21st
- Decades: 1820s; 1830s; 1840s; 1850s; 1860s
- See also: 1843 in the United Kingdom; Other events of 1843; List of years in Ireland

Events from the year 1843 in Ireland.

== Events ==
- January – Daniel O'Connell proclaims 1843 as the "Repeal Year".
- 31 January – Queen's Bridge in Belfast opens.
- 21 February – repeal (of the Act of Union) debate in Dublin Corporation.
- 17 March – earthquake in the Irish Sea.
- 11 June
  - Series of monster meetings to agitate for repeal begins at Tuam.
  - O'Connell's "Mallow defiance".
- 15 August – repeal meeting at Tara.
- 17 August – Loreto Abbey, Dalkey opened as a girls' boarding and day school by the Sisters of Loreto.
- 18 August – Dalkey Atmospheric Railway opens unofficially.
- 7 October – O'Connell gives in to government prohibition of Clontarf meeting planned for the next day. However, he is charged with conspiracy a few days later.
- November – Devon Commission appointed to research the problems with land leases.
- Work starts on the building of Crumlin Road Prison in Belfast.
- George Cannock and Andrew White establish the Dublin business that becomes Arnotts department store.

== Arts and literature ==
- Charles Lever's novel Arthur O'Leary: His wanderings and ponderings in many lands is published serially in Dublin University Magazine and Tom Burke of Ours begins serial publication in Dublin.

== Births ==
- 11 January – C. Y. O'Connor, engineer in Australia (died 1902).
- 3 May – Edward Dowden, critic and poet (died 1913).
- 14 August – Thomas Workman, entomologist and arachnologist (died 1900).
- 6 November – William James Craig, Shakespearean scholar (died 1906).
- 24 November – Richard Croker, politician in America and a leader of New York City's Tammany Hall (died 1922).
- 21 December – Thomas Bracken, poet (died 1898 in New Zealand).
- 25 December
  - Albert Cashier, born Jennie Hodgers, soldier in the Union Army during the American Civil War, lived as a man (died 1915 in the United States).
  - George Fisher, Mayor of Wellington (died 1905 in New Zealand).
- 28 December – George Thomas Stokes, ecclesiastical historian (died 1898).
- Full date unknown – Joanna Hiffernan, artists' model (died after 1903).

== Deaths ==
- 19 February – Michael Joseph Quin, author, journalist and editor (born 1796).
- 11 May – William Vesey-FitzGerald, 2nd Baron FitzGerald and Vesey, politician and statesman (born 1783).
- 10 August – Robert Adrain, scientist and mathematician in America (born 1775).
- 16 November – Abraham Colles, professor of Anatomy, Surgery and Physiology at the Royal College of Surgeons in Ireland (born 1773).
- 21 December – Edward Bunting, musician (born 1773).

== See also ==
- 1843 in Scotland
- 1843 in Wales
