= 1774 in Ireland =

- Centuries: 16th; 17th; 18th; 19th; 20th
- Decades: 1750s; 1760s; 1770s; 1780s; 1790s
- See also: Other events of 1774; List of years in Ireland

Events from the year 1774 in Ireland.

== Incumbent ==
- Monarch: George III

== Events ==
- 17 September – Clifton House, Belfast, the Belfast Charitable Society's poorhouse, is opened.
- New buildings in Armagh provided by Archbishop Richard Robinson are completed for the County Infirmary, Royal School and Military Barracks.

== Births ==
- 7 May – Francis Beaufort, hydrographer and officer in the British Royal Navy, creator of the Beaufort scale (died 1857).
- 11 July – Somerset Lowry-Corry, 2nd Earl Belmore, politician and statesman (died 1841).
- 29 December – Maurice FitzGerald, 18th Knight of Kerry, Whig politician (died 1849).
  Full date unknown
  - Máire Bhuí Ní Laoghaire, poet (d.c1849).
  - Bartholomew Teeling, a leader of the Irish forces during the Irish Rebellion of 1798 (died 1798).

== Deaths ==
- 4 April – Oliver Goldsmith, novelist and playwright (born 1728 or 1730).
- 11 July – Sir William Johnson, 1st Baronet, pioneer and army officer in colonial New York (born 1715).
- 14 July – Field Marshal James O'Hara, 2nd Baron Tyrawley, officer in the British Army (born 1682).
- 27 December – Henry Mossop, actor (born 1729).
- Sir Robert Blackwood, 1st Baronet (born 1694).
