= 1780 in Ireland =

- Centuries: 16th; 17th; 18th; 19th; 20th
- Decades: 1760s; 1770s; 1780s; 1790s; 1800s
- See also: Other events of 1780; List of years in Ireland

Events from the year 1780 in Ireland.

== Incumbent ==
- Monarch: George III

== Events ==
- August – passenger boat service begins on Grand Canal between Dublin and Sallins.
- Sacramental Test abolished.
- Henry Grattan demands parliamentary independence.
- Lady Berry, sentenced to death for the murder of her son, is released when she agrees to become an executioner (retires 1810).
- The model cotton manufacturing town of Prosperous, County Kildare, developed by Robert Brooke (East India Company officer), begins to function.
- The whiskey company John Jameson is established.

== Births ==
- January – William Henry Fitton, geologist (died 1861).
- 12 March – David Barry, military surgeon and physiologist (died 1835).
- 20 March – Myles Byrne, a leader of the Irish Rebellion of 1798 and soldier in the service of France (died 1862).
- 13 April – Alexander Mitchell, engineer and inventor of the screw-pile lighthouse (died 1868).
- May – Amhlaoibh Ó Súilleabháin, author, teacher, draper and politician (died 1838).
- 17 August – George Croly, poet, novelist, historian and divine (died 1860).
- 1 December – Edward Bowen, lawyer and politician in Lower Canada (died 1866).
- 20 December – John Wilson Croker, statesman and author (died 1857).
- Full date unknown
  - Michael John Brenan, priest and ecclesiastical historian (died 1847).
  - Thady Connellan, schoolteacher and writer (died 1854).
  - Anne Devlin, republican and housekeeper to Robert Emmet (died 1851).

== Deaths ==
- 2 February – Thomas Waite, civil servant (born 1718).
- 3 June – Henry Denny Denson, soldier and politician in Nova Scotia (born c.1715).
- 25 August – William Bowles, naturalist (born 1705).
- October (drowned at sea) – Robert Boyle-Walsingham, British Royal Navy officer and politician (born 1736).
- 19 November – Jocelyn Deane, politician (born 1749).
