= 1772 in Ireland =

- Centuries: 16th; 17th; 18th; 19th; 20th
- Decades: 1750s; 1760s; 1770s; 1780s; 1790s
- See also: Other events of 1772; List of years in Ireland

Events from the year 1772 in Ireland.

== Incumbent ==
- Monarch: George III

== Events ==
- 3 June – the London-Derry Journal and General Advertiser is first published.
- 27 July – the Johnston Baronetcy, of Gilford in the County of Down, is created in the Baronetage of Ireland.

== Births ==
- 1 May – Lowry Cole, soldier, politician and MP for Enniskillen from 1797 to 1800, Governor of Mauritius and Cape Colony (died 1842).
- 16 July – William Annesley, 3rd Earl Annesley, politician (died 1838).
- 9 October – Mary Tighe, poet (died 1810).
- Robert Blake, dentist, first State Dentist of Dublin (died 1822).
- Edward Southwell Ruthven, Repealer politician and member of the United Kingdom Parliament (died 1836).

== Deaths ==
- 10 June – Abraham Creighton, 1st Baron Erne, peer.
