= 1766 in Ireland =

- Centuries: 16th; 17th; 18th; 19th; 20th
- Decades: 1740s; 1750s; 1760s; 1770s; 1780s
- See also: Other events of 1766; List of years in Ireland

The year 1766 in Ireland is characterised by certain events, arts and literature occurrences, births and deaths.

== Incumbent ==
- Monarch: George III

== Events ==
- 12 March – the Blunden Baronetcy, of Castle Blunden, in the County of Kilkenny is created in the Baronetage of Ireland for John Blunden, a member of the Irish House of Commons.
- 15 March – Nicholas Sheehy, the Roman Catholic priest of Clogheen, County Tipperary, and an open opponent of the Penal Laws against Catholics, having been tried on dubious evidence as an accessory to murder, is hanged, drawn and quartered at Clonmel.
- 1 July – establishment of the first Volunteers of Ireland corps.
- 3 November – the Parnell Baronetcy, of Rathleague, is created in the Baronetage of Ireland for John Parnell, High Sheriff of Queen's County.

== Arts and literature ==
- Oliver Goldsmith's novel The Vicar of Wakefield is first published.

== Births ==
- 23 January – William Cusac Smith, Baronet, judge (died 1836)
- 26 December – Henry Conyngham, 1st Marquess Conyngham, politician (died 1832).
- Standish O'Grady, 1st Viscount Guillamore, Lord Chief Baron of the Exchequer in Ireland (died 1840).
- William Orr, member of the Society of United Irishmen (executed 1797).
- John Templeton, naturalist and botanist (died 1825).
- Possible date – Peter Finnerty, publisher and member of the Society of United Irishmen (died 1822).

== Deaths ==
- 15 March – Nicholas Sheehy, Roman Catholic priest (born 1728).
- 26 September – Frances Sheridan, novelist and playwright (born 1724).
