= 1845 in Ireland =

- Centuries: 17th; 18th; 19th; 20th; 21st
- Decades: 1820s; 1830s; 1840s; 1850s; 1860s
- See also: 1845 in the United Kingdom; Other events of 1845; List of years in Ireland

Events from the year 1845 in Ireland.

== Events ==
- 18 February – The Devon Commission reported to the British government on the poor living conditions of the Irish population: "in many districts their only food is the potato".
- September–December – African American abolitionist Frederick Douglass made a speaking tour of Ireland.
- 9 September – The previously unknown potato blight fungus struck the potato crop, initiating the Great Famine.
- 1 October – Wesley College (Dublin) was founded.
- 31 October–1 November: an emergency meeting of the Cabinet of the United Kingdom (summoned on 15 October by Sir Robert Peel, the prime minister of the United Kingdom) voted against Peel on the distribution of relief in Ireland, considering it would call the Corn Laws into question.
- 9–10 November – Peel ordered the secret purchase of £100,000 worth of maize and meal from the United States for distribution in Ireland.
- 15 November – scientific commissioners (appointed in October) reported that half the Irish potato crop had been destroyed by the blight.
- 20 November – a relief commission for Ireland first met.
- 25 November – the Dublin to Longford passenger boat hit the canal bank and capsized on the Royal Canal outside Clonsilla, Dublin at approximately 4:00pm, drowning 15 people
- 5 December – unable to persuade his Cabinet to repeal the Corn Laws in the face of the Great Famine, Peel tendered his resignation as Prime Minister of the United Kingdom to Queen Victoria but was reinstated days later when Lord John Russell was unable to form a government.
- 30 December – The Queen's Colleges of Belfast, Cork and Galway were incorporated under the powers given by "An Act to enable Her Majesty to endow new Colleges for the Advancement of Learning in Ireland".

== Full date unknown ==
- Bessbrook in County Armagh was established as a model village by Quaker linen manufacturer John Grubb Richardson.
- Construction began on the "Leviathan of Parsonstown", a telescope built by William Parsons, 3rd Earl of Rosse.
- Crumlin Road Gaol in Belfast was completed.
- The publication of the annual Thom's Irish Almanac and Official Directory, or Thom's Directory for short, began in Dublin.

== Arts and literature ==
- Charles Lever's novel The O'Donoghue: a tale of Ireland fifty years ago is published in Dublin and St Patrick's Eve in London.

== Births ==
- 23 March – John T. Browne, Mayor of Houston, Texas (died 1941).
- 6 April – Edward Hardman, geologist (died 1887).
- 10 June – David Dickson Rogers, politician in Ontario (died 1915).
- 17 June – Emily Lawless, writer (died 1913 in England).
- 1 July – James Bell, United States Army soldier, awarded the Medal of Honor in 1876 during the Indian Wars (died 1901).
- 4 July – Thomas John Barnardo, philanthropist (died 1905).
- 23 November – Charlotte Grace O'Brien, political and social activist, writer and plant collector (died 1909).
  Full date unknown
  - James Carey, Fenian and informer (murdered at sea 1883).
  - Eglantyne Louisa Jebb, social reformer (died 1925).
  - James O'Kelly, nationalist politician and journalist, Irish Parliamentary Party MP (died 1916).
  - John Pinkerton, Irish Parliamentary Party MP (died 1908).

== Deaths ==
- 22 February – William Wellesley-Pole, 3rd Earl of Mornington, politician (born 1763).
- 28 April – James Graham, soldier, commended for his gallantry during the Battle of Waterloo (born 1791).
- 13 July – Johnston Drummond, early settler of Western Australia, botanical and zoological collector (born 1820).
- 16 September – Thomas Osborne Davis, lawyer and writer, author of the song "A Nation Once Again" (born 1814).
- 17 December – Armar Lowry-Corry, 3rd Earl Belmore, politician and High Sheriff (born 1801).

== See also ==
- 1845 in Scotland
- 1845 in Wales

== Sources ==
- Thom, Alexander, ed. (1852). Thom's Irish Almanac and Official Directory, with the Post-Office Dublin City and County Directory, for the year 1852. Dublin: Alexander Thom, Printer and Publisher, 87 and 88, Abbey-Street.
