= 1893 in Ireland =

- Centuries: 17th; 18th; 19th; 20th; 21st
- Decades: 1870s; 1880s; 1890s; 1900s; 1910s
- See also: 1893 in the United Kingdom; Other events of 1893; List of years in Ireland

Events from the year 1893 in Ireland.

== Events ==
- January – the National Labour League, a predecessor of the Irish Land and Labour Association, is founded in Kanturk, County Cork.
- 19 January – Michael Logue is created a cardinal, the first Archbishop of Armagh to be so elevated.
- February – Prime Minister of the United Kingdom W. E. Gladstone introduces his second Home Rule Bill to the House of Commons of the United Kingdom, where it is passed. The biggest opposition to Home Rule manifests itself in Ulster, particularly amongst Protestants.
- 26 April – Edward Carson is called to the English Bar at the Middle Temple
- 19 May – the neoclassical Roman Catholic St Mel's cathedral, Longford (foundation stone laid 1840 and opened for worship in 1856), is consecrated.
- 31 July – Douglas Hyde, Eoin MacNeill, Eugene O'Growney and Thomas O'Neill Russell establish the Gaelic League to encourage the preservation of Irish culture, with Hyde becoming its first president.
- 8 September – Gladstone's second Home Rule Bill is rejected by the House of Lords.
- The Girls' Brigade is founded in Dublin, origin of the international Christian youth organisation.

== Arts and literature ==
- 19 April – Oscar Wilde stages A Woman of No Importance in London.
- December – W. B. Yeats publishes The Celtic Twilight, giving a popular name to the Irish Literary Revival.
- Douglas Hyde publishes Love Songs of Connacht.

== Sport ==
=== Football ===
- International
  25 February England 6–1 Ireland (in Birmingham)
  25 March Scotland 6–1 Ireland (in Glasgow)
  5 April Ireland 4–3 Wales (in Belfast)
- Irish League
  Winners: Linfield
- Irish Cup
  Winners: Linfield 5–1 Cliftonville
- Derry Olympic becomes defunct after only one season in the Irish Football League.

=== Golf ===
- Ormeau Golf Club in Belfast and Ballybunion Golf Club are formed.

=== Hockey ===
- Irish Hockey Union was formed on 6 February.

== Births ==
- 26 January – Kitty Kiernan, fiancée of Michael Collins (died 1945)
- 5 February – John Lymbrick Esmonde, soldier, Fine Gael TD (died 1958).
- 22 February – Peadar O'Donnell, Irish Republican socialist, Marxist activist and writer (died 1986).
- 6 March – Denis Rolleston Gwynn, journalist, author and professor of modern Irish history (died 1973).
- 4 April – Dick McKee, Irish Republican Army member in Easter Rising (shot by Crown forces 1920).
- 14 May – George McElroy, Royal Flying Corps and Royal Air Force pilot during World War I (killed in action 1918).
- 9 June – Cathal O'Shannon, politician, trade unionist and journalist (died 1969).
- 14 June – Séamus Burke, Sinn Féin TD, a founder-member of Cumann na nGaedheal and later Fine Gael (died 1967).
- 26 July – E. R. Dodds, classical scholar (died 1973).
- 10 August – Mick O'Brien, soccer player and manager (died 1940).
- 30 September – Seán MacEoin, major general, Fine Gael TD and Cabinet Minister (died 1973).
- 13 October – Seán Russell, Irish republican and a chief of staff of the Irish Republican Army (died 1940 at sea).
- 26 October – Thomas MacGreevy, poet and director of the National Gallery of Ireland (died 1967).
- 1 November – Neal Blaney, Fianna Fáil TD, Seanad member (died 1948).
- 9 November – Liam Lynch, commanding general of the anti-Treaty Irish Republican Army during the Irish Civil War (shot and killed 1923).
- 20 December
  - Eddie Duffy, traditional Irish musician (died 1986).
  - Billy McCandless, footballer and football manager (died 1955).
  Full date unknown
  - Tomás Bairéad, journalist and author (died 1973).
  - Frank Gallagher, Irish Volunteer and author (died 1962).
  - Mick Kenny, Galway hurler (died 1959).
  - Harry Midgley, Northern Ireland Labour Party member of the Parliament of Northern Ireland and alderman of Belfast (died 1957).

== Deaths ==
- 3 March – Hugh Nelson, politician in Canada and Lieutenant-Governor of British Columbia (born 1830).
- 16 April – William Davis Ardagh, lawyer, judge and politician in Canada (born 1828).
- 27 April – John Ballance, 14th Premier of New Zealand (born 1839).
- 5 September – Mike Cleary, boxer (born 1858).
- 8 November – Arnaud-Michel d'Abbadie, geographer (born 1815).
- 28 December – James Donnelly, Bishop of the Diocese of Clogher (born 1823).

== See also ==
- 1893 in Scotland
- 1893 in Wales
