= 1846 in Ireland =

- Centuries: 17th; 18th; 19th; 20th; 21st
- Decades: 1820s; 1830s; 1840s; 1850s; 1860s
- See also: 1846 in the United Kingdom; Other events of 1846; List of years in Ireland

Events from the year 1846 in Ireland.

== Events ==
- Ongoing – Great Hunger: The first deaths from hunger took place early in the year. Phytophthora infestans almost totally destroyed the summer potato crop and the Famine worsened considerably. By December, a third of a million destitute people were employed on public works.
- 13 March – Ballinlass incident: 300 tenants were evicted in the village of Ballinlass in County Galway.
- 4 August – Kingsbridge Station (now Heuston Station) opened in Dublin as the terminus and headquarters of the Great Southern and Western Railway
- 22 September – the Great Western Steamship Company's SS Great Britain, bound from Liverpool for New York, ran aground in Dundrum Bay (County Down). She lay there for almost a year, protected by temporary measures organised by her designer, I. K. Brunel.

== Full date unknown ==
- Maziere Brady succeeded Sir Edward Sugden as Lord Chancellor of Ireland, an office which he would hold (with short intervals) until 1866.
- HM Prison Crumlin Road in Belfast was opened with the arrival of the first inmates, who were forced to walk from Carrickfergus Prison in chains.

== Arts and literature ==
- The first substantial English translation of the Annals of the Four Masters, made by Owen Connellan, was published.
- The Anglo-Celt newspaper began weekly publication in Cavan.
- Historian Ruaidhrí Ó Flaithbheartaigh (Roderic O'Flaherty)'s Chorographical description of West or Iar Connacht (1684) was first published.

== Births ==
- 10 February – Lord Charles Beresford, British admiral (died 1919)
- 13 February – John O'Connor Power, Irish Nationalist politician and Member of Parliament (died 1919).
- 25 March – Michael Davitt, republican, nationalist agrarian agitator, social campaigner, labour leader and Irish National Land League founder (died 1906).
- 27 June – Charles Stewart Parnell, Irish nationalist leader (died 1891).
- 30 June – Frances Margaret Milne, author and librarian (died 1910 in the United States).
- 22 July – Alfred Perceval Graves, writer (died 1931).
- 13 August – Otto Jaffe, twice elected as Irish Unionist Party Lord Mayor of Belfast (died 1929).
- 10 September – John F. Finerty, U.S. Representative from Illinois (died 1908).
- 18 September – Standish James O'Grady, author, journalist and historian (died 1928).
- 23 August – Sir Henry Bellingham, 4th Baronet, politician and barrister (died 1921).
- 9 October – Frank Hugh O'Donnell, writer and nationalist politician (died 1916).
- 18 November – Samuel Cleland Davidson, inventor and engineer (died 1921)

== Deaths ==
- 3 April – Zozimus (Michael J. Moran), comic poet (b. c. 1794)
- 12 October – Lawrence Kavenagh, bushranger (b. c. 1805)
- exact date unknown – George Darley, poet, novelist and critic (born 1795).

== See also ==
- 1846 in Scotland
- 1846 in Wales
