= 1894 in Ireland =

- Centuries: 17th; 18th; 19th; 20th; 21st
- Decades: 1870s; 1880s; 1890s; 1900s; 1910s
- See also: 1894 in the United Kingdom; Other events of 1894; List of years in Ireland

Events from the year 1894 in Ireland.

== Events ==
- 3 March – William Ewart Gladstone resigns as Prime Minister of the United Kingdom. In his career, he introduced land reform to Ireland and also attempted to grant Home Rule.
- 14 June – hooker Victory capsizes off Westport, County Mayo with the loss of at least 30 aboard.
- 15 August – the Irish Land and Labour Association is formed at a labour convention at Limerick Junction, County Tipperary, with D. D. Sheehan as chairman and J. J. O'Shee as secretary.
- 28–29 December – the SS Inishtrahull is lost off Kilkee with the loss of 26 aboard.
- The first meeting of the Irish Trades Union Congress takes place.
- The Irish Agricultural Organisation Society is established by Horace Plunkett. The new organisation encourages the co-operative movement.
- Professor John Joly of Trinity College Dublin, devises a colour photographic process.
- Bewley's open their first café in Dublin.

== Arts and literature ==
- Thomas A. Finlay, S.J., is founding editor of the literary magazine The New Ireland Review (Dublin, March).
- George Moore publishes Esther Waters.
- Somerville and Ross publish The Real Charlotte.

== Sport ==
=== Football ===
- International
  24 February Wales 4–1 Ireland (in Swansea)
  3 March Ireland 2–2 England (in Belfast)
  31 March Ireland 1–2 Scotland (in Belfast)
- Irish League
  Winners: Glentoran
- Irish Cup
  Winners: Distillery 2–2, 3–2 Linfield

=== Golf ===
- Portmarnock Golf Club, Fingal, and Portstewart Golf Club, County Londonderry, are founded.

== Births ==
- 1 January – Augustine Kelly, cricketer (died 1960).
- 30 January – Wentworth Allen, cricketer (died 1943).
- 22 April – Evie Hone, painter and stained glass artist (died 1955).
- 1 May – James Everett, Labour Party TD, Cabinet Minister, famed for Battle of Baltinglass, 44 years service as a TD (died 1967).
- 5 May – Joe Keppel, comic performer (died 1977).
- 4 June – Patricia Lynch, children's writer (died 1972).
- 15 June – Maurice Moore, Irish republican fighting in the Irish War of Independence (executed 1921).
- 28 June – Ronald Ossory Dunlop, painter and author (died 1973).
- 22 July – Florence O'Donoghue, historian and Irish Republican Army intelligence officer (died 1967).
- 23 July – Norman Stronge, Ulster Unionist Party politician and Speaker of the Northern Ireland House of Commons for 23 years (died 1981).
- 9 August – Walter Starkie, author, translator and scholar of southern European civilisations (died 1976 in Spain)
- 24 August – Elisha Scott, footballer (died 1959).
- 31 August – Patrick Joseph Kelly, Bishop of Benin City (died 1991).
- 30 September – Michael Tierney, Cumann na nGaedheal TD, Fine Gael member of Seanad Éireann and President of University College Dublin (died 1975).
- 3 October – Frederick Jeremiah Edwards, recipient of the Victoria Cross for gallantry in 1916 at Thiepval, France (died 1964).
- 14 October – Tom McEllistrim, Fianna Fáil TD (died 1973).
- 14 November – Daniel Joseph Sheehan, Royal Naval Air Service and Royal Flying Corps pilot in World War I, killed in action (died 1917).
- 17 December – Cecile O'Rahilly, scholar of the Celtic languages and writer (died 1980).

== Deaths ==
- 20 January – Robert Halpin, master mariner (born 1836).
- 30 August – Joseph Robinson Kirk, sculptor (born 1821).
- 26 September – Launt Thompson, sculptor (born 1833).
- 28 December – James Graham Fair, part-owner of the Comstock Lode, United States Senator and real estate and railroad speculator (born 1831).

== See also ==
- 1894 in Scotland
- 1894 in Wales
