= 1777 in Ireland =

- Centuries: 16th; 17th; 18th; 19th; 20th
- Decades: 1750s; 1760s; 1770s; 1780s; 1790s
- See also: Other events of 1777; List of years in Ireland

Events from the year 1777 in Ireland.

== Incumbent ==
- Monarch: George III

== Events ==
- 25 January – John Hobart, 2nd Earl of Buckinghamshire, is sworn in as Lord Lieutenant of Ireland.
- 19 February – the Langrishe Baronetcy, of Knocktopher Abbey in the County of Kilkenny, is created in the Baronetage of Ireland for Hercules Langrishe, Member of Parliament for Knocktopher in the Irish House of Commons.
- 29 May – the Palmer Baronetcy, of Castle Lackin in the County of Mayo, is created in the Baronetage of Ireland for Roger Palmer.
- Summer – the code duello is adopted at the Clonmel Assizes as the form for pistol duels by gentlemen in Ireland.
- Rev. Thomas Campbell publishes the first edition of A Philosophical Survey of the South of Ireland in a series of letters to John Watkinson, M.D. anonymously in London.
- The Trinity College Dublin Zoological Museum is formed.

== Arts and literature ==
- 15 April – first performance of John O'Keeffe's play The Shamrock at the Crow Street Theatre in Dublin. The playwright moves to London this year.
- 8 May – first performance of Richard Brinsley Sheridan's comedy of manners The School for Scandal at the Theatre Royal, Drury Lane in London.

== Births ==
- 17 March – Patrick Brunty, Anglican clergyman and father of the Brontë sisters (died 1861).
- 4 May – Richard Bourke, soldier and Governor of New South Wales, Australia from 1831 to 1837 (died 1855).
- 22 June – William Brown, creator and first admiral of the Argentine Navy (died 1857).
- 12 August - Chichester Fortescue, who briefly served as an Irish Member of Parliament (died 1826).

== Deaths ==
- 3 February – Hugh Kelly, dramatist and poet (born 1739).
- 18 July – William O'Brien, 4th Earl of Inchiquin, peer and politician (born 1700).
