= 1778 in Ireland =

- Centuries: 16th; 17th; 18th; 19th; 20th
- Decades: 1750s; 1760s; 1770s; 1780s; 1790s
- See also: Other events of 1778; List of years in Ireland

Events from the year 1778 in Ireland.

== Incumbent ==
- Monarch: George III

== Events ==
- 28 March – Hugh O'Reilly succeeds Daniel O'Reilly as Roman Catholic Bishop of Clogher, an office he will hold until 1801.
- April – the Ladies of Llangollen run away from Ireland to set up a rural household together.
- 24 April – American Revolutionary War: North Channel Naval Duel: John Paul Jones in USS Ranger captures HMS Drake in the North Channel off Carrickfergus.
- Papists Act provides a measure of Catholic Relief: Catholics now have property rights and may intermarry; and restoration of Catholic religious institutions begins.
- Charles Vallancey surveys West Cork.
- The 90ft tall round tower adjoining the Church of St Michael le Pole in Dublin is demolished for safety reasons after being damaged by a storm in November 1775

== Births ==
- 4 March – Robert Emmet, nationalist, rebel against British rule in 1803 (executed 1803).
- 18 May – Charles Stewart, 3rd Marquess of Londonderry, soldier, politician and nobleman (died 1854).
- 29 September – Catherine McAuley, nun (died 1841).
- 15 November – George Canning, 1st Baron Garvagh, politician (died 1840).

== Deaths ==
- March – Thomas Roberts, landscape painter (born 1748).
- 28 March – Daniel O’Reilly, Roman Catholic Bishop of Clogher (born 1700).
