= 1833 in Ireland =

- Centuries: 17th; 18th; 19th; 20th; 21st
- Decades: 1810s; 1820s; 1830s; 1840s; 1850s
- See also: 1833 in the United Kingdom; Other events of 1833; List of years in Ireland

Events from the year 1833 in Ireland.

== Events ==
- 29 July – Nathaniel Sneyd is shot in the head by a madman on Westmoreland Street, Dublin. He dies from his injuries two days later.
- August – Mount Melleray Abbey in the Knockmealdown Mountains is founded, the first Cistercian foundation in Ireland in modern times.
- 10 August – major fire in stores of the Custom House, Dublin, sets River Liffey aflame.
- 14 August – Church Temporalities Act 1833 suppresses ten bishoprics in the Church of Ireland, with dioceses to be merged as sees fall vacant, and provides for abolition of Vestry Assessment.
- 28 August – the school which will evolve into Castleknock College is opened in Dublin by the Vincentian community.
- Katherine Sophia Kane's The Irish Flora is published anonymously.

== Arts and literature ==
- Early – Gustavus Vaughan Brooke, aged 14, makes his stage debut, at the Dublin Theatre, playing William Tell.

== Births ==
- 21 January – Joseph Prosser, recipient of the Victoria Cross for gallantry in 1855 at Sevastopol, Crimea (died 1869).
- 8 February – Launt Thompson, sculptor (died 1894).
- 4 May – Michael N. Nolan, U.S. Representative from New York, mayor of Albany (died 1905).
- 29 May – William Hare, 3rd Earl of Listowel, peer and Liberal politician (died 1924).
- 4 June – Garnet Wolseley, 1st Viscount Wolseley, soldier (died 1913).
- 17 July – Hugh Talbot Burgoyne, recipient of the Victoria Cross for gallantry in 1855 in the Sea of Azov, Crimea (died 1870).
- 3 November – William Knox Leet, recipient of the Victoria Cross for gallantry in 1879 at Inhlobana, Zululand, South Africa (died 1898).
- 7 November – William Temple, recipient of the Victoria Cross for gallantry in 1863 at Rangiriri, New Zealand (died 1919).
- Sir Theobald Hubert Burke, 13th Baronet (died 1909).
- Henry James O'Farrell, would-be assassin (executed 1868 in Australia).

== Deaths ==
- 28 March – William Thompson, political and philosophical writer and social reformer (born 1775).
- 3 May – Nicholas Tuite MacCarthy, Jesuit preacher (born 1769).
- 31 July – Nathaniel Sneyd, politician, landowner and businessman.

== In fiction ==
- Brian Friel's play Translations (premiered 1980) is set in County Donegal in 1833.

== See also ==
- 1833 in Scotland
- 1833 in Wales
