= 1761 in Ireland =

- Centuries: 16th; 17th; 18th; 19th; 20th
- Decades: 1740s; 1750s; 1760s; 1770s; 1780s
- See also: Other events of 1761; List of years in Ireland

Events from the year 1761 in Ireland.

== Incumbent ==
- Monarch: George III

== Events ==
- 10 November – Protestant "manifesto of intolerance" ("Black Petition") against Roman Catholics signed in Galway.

== Births ==
- 20 July – Arthur Gore, 3rd Earl of Arran, politician (died 1837).
- 17 September – Samuel Neilson, one of the founder members of the Society of United Irishmen and the founder of its newspaper the Northern Star (died 1803).
- 21 November – Dorothea Jordan (née Bland), actress and mistress of Prince William, Duke of Clarence, later King William IV (died 1816 in France).
  Full date unknown
  - Michael Byrne, signed as an able seaman by Captain Bligh on HMS Bounty, primarily to play the fiddle.

== Deaths ==
- 7 January – Darkey Kelly, brothel-keeper, burned at the stake for murder.
- 10 September – William Blakeney, 1st Baron Blakeney, soldier (born 1672).
