= 1773 in Ireland =

- Centuries: 16th; 17th; 18th; 19th; 20th
- Decades: 1750s; 1760s; 1770s; 1780s; 1790s
- See also: Other events of 1773; List of years in Ireland

Events from the year 1773 in Ireland.

== Incumbent ==
- Monarch: George III

== Events ==
- Formation of Volunteer corps: the First Magherafelt Volunteers (June); and the Offerlane Blues (10 October).

== Arts and literature ==
- 15 March – first performance of Oliver Goldsmith's comedy She Stoops to Conquer at the Covent Garden Theatre in London.
- 4 May – Eibhlín Dubh Ní Chonaill (Eileen O' Connell) composes the keen Caoineadh Airt Uí Laoghaire over the body of her husband Art Ó Laoghaire.
- Thomas Leland publishes The History of Ireland, from the invasion of Henry II.

== Births ==
- 23 July – Abraham Colles, professor of Anatomy, Surgery and Physiology at the Royal College of Surgeons in Ireland (died 1843).
- 19 August – Valentine Lawless, 2nd Baron Cloncurry, politician (died 1853).
- 19 November – Robert Arbuthnot, British military officer (died 1853).
- 22 November – John George de la Poer Beresford, Archbishop of Armagh (Church of Ireland) (died 1862).
  Full date unknown
  - William Beatty, Ship's Surgeon on HMS Victory during the Battle of Trafalgar (died 1842).
  - Edward Bunting, musician (died 1843).
  - John Shaw, Captain in the United States Navy (died 1823).

== Deaths ==
- 17 April – Arthur Gore, 1st Earl of Arran, politician (born 1703).
- 19 November – Charles Clinton, French and Indian War Colonel (born 1690.
- 19 November – James FitzGerald, 1st Duke of Leinster, politician (born 1722).
