= 1838 in Ireland =

- Centuries: 17th; 18th; 19th; 20th; 21st
- Decades: 1810s; 1820s; 1830s; 1840s; 1850s
- See also: 1838 in the United Kingdom; Other events of 1838; List of years in Ireland

Events from the year 1838 in Ireland.

== Events ==
- 4–22 April – the paddle steamer SS Sirius (1837) makes the Transatlantic Crossing to New York from Cork in eighteen days, though not using steam continuously.
- 15 August – following a year of widespread hunger the government institutes relief work and reduces the tithe rent for the poor by the Poor Law and Tithe Acts.
- Foundation of a temperance society in Cork known as the Knights of Father Mathew by Theobald Mathew, a capuchin friar.

== Births ==
- January – Richard W. Dowling, victorious Confederate commander at the Second Battle of Sabine Pass in the American Civil War (died 1867 in the United States).
- 24 January – Ricard O'Sullivan Burke, nationalist, Fenian activist, Union soldier in the American Civil War, U.S. Republican Party campaigner and public works engineer (died 1922 in the United States).
- 2 February – Nathaniel Burslem, soldier, recipient of the Victoria Cross for gallantry in 1860 at the Taku Forts, China (died 1865).
- 13 February – Michael Sullivan, physician, professor and politician in Canada (died 1915).
- 26 March – William Edward Hartpole Lecky, historian (died 1903 in England).
- 3 June – Daniel O'Reilly, U.S. Representative from New York (died 1911 in the United States).
- 23 June – James Gildea, soldier and philanthropist, founder of the Soldiers', Sailors' and Airmen's Families Association (died 1920).
- 5 July – William Robinson, gardener (died 1935).
- 8 July – John Burke, Union colonel in the American Civil War (died 1914 in the United States).
- 28 July – Augustus Nicholas Burke, artist (died 1891).
- 24 August – James Hamilton, 2nd Duke of Abercorn, politician and diplomat (died 1913).
- 11 September – John Ireland, third bishop and first Archbishop of Saint Paul, Minnesota (died 1918 in the United States).
- 18 September – Sir Thomas Drew, architect, first designer of St Anne’s Cathedral, Belfast (died 1910).
- 1 November – Anthony Traill, provost of Trinity College Dublin (died 1914).
- 18 December – Michael Thomas Stenson, politician in Canada (died 1912).
  Full date unknown
  - John Philip Nolan, soldier, landowner and politician (died 1912).
  - Dudley Stagpoole, soldier, recipient of the Victoria Cross for gallantry in 1863 near Poutoko in Taranaki, New Zealand (died 1911 in England).

== Deaths ==
- Amhlaoibh Ó Súilleabháin, author, teacher, draper and politician (born 1780).

== See also ==
- 1838 in Scotland
- 1838 in Wales
