= 1891 in Ireland =

- Centuries: 17th; 18th; 19th; 20th; 21st
- Decades: 1870s; 1880s; 1890s; 1900s; 1910s
- See also: 1891 in the United Kingdom; Other events of 1891; List of years in Ireland

Events from the year 1891 in Ireland.

== Events ==
- March – Anti-Parnellites form the Irish National Federation and win seats in Sligo and Carlow.
- June – Charles Stewart Parnell marries Kitty O'Shea in Sussex.
- 6 October – Charles Stewart Parnell dies. Up to 200,000 people attend the funeral of the 'Uncrowned King of Ireland.'
- The Balfour Land Act makes more funds available for land purchase and sets up the Congested Districts Board for Ireland.
- The Irish Daily Independent newspaper is founded. It becomes the Irish Independent in 1905.
- James Stephens, founder of the Irish Republican Brotherhood, returns home to Ireland after 25 years in exile.
- Michael Davitt, standing as an anti-Parnellite candidate, is defeated by John Redmond in a Waterford by-election.

== Arts and literature ==
- April – Oscar Wilde publishes The Picture of Dorian Gray in book form.
- October – 9-year-old James Joyce writes a poem in memory of Parnell later entitled Et tu, Healy which his father has printed as a broadside.
- Standish James O'Grady publishes Finn and his Companions.

== Sport ==
=== Football ===
- International
  7 February Ireland 7–2 Wales (in Belfast)
  7 March England 6–1 Ireland (in Wolverhampton)
  March Scotland 2–1 Ireland (in Glasgow)
  Irish League
  Winners: Linfield (first ever winners)
  Irish Cup
  Winners: Linfield 4–2 Ulster
- Belfast Celtic F.C. is founded.
- Derry Olympic is founded. It joins the Irish Football League the next year, but only lasts one season.

=== Gaelic games ===
- All-Ireland Senior Hurling Championship Final
  - Kerry 2–3 : 1–5 Wexford
- All-Ireland Senior Football Championship Final
  - Dublin 2–1 : 1–9 Cork

=== Golf ===
- 13 November – Golfing Union of Ireland established at a meeting in Belfast.
- Fortwilliam Golf Club in Belfast and Limerick Golf Club are founded.

== Births ==
- 18 February – John M. O'Sullivan, Cumann na nGaedheal TD and cabinet Minister (died 1948).
- 21 February – Harry Colley, Fianna Fáil TD, Seanad member (died 1972).
- 21 February – Seán Heuston, Fianna Éireann member, participant in Easter Rising (executed by firing squad in Kilmainham Jail 1916).
- 25 February – Edward Daly, participant in Easter Rising (executed by firing squad 1916).
- 17 March – Emily Anderson, British Foreign Office cryptanalyst, scholar of German and musicologist (died 1962).
- 10 April – Kaye Don, racing driver (died 1981).
- 11 April – Vincent McNamara, Ireland rugby union player (killed in action on Gallipoli Campaign 1915).
- 16 April – Richard Saul, British Royal Air Force air vice marshal (died 1965 in the United Kingdom).
- 13 May – Patrick Hogan, Sinn Féin and Cumann na nGaedheal TD (died 1936).
- 20 June – John A. Costello, barrister, Attorney-General, Fine Gael TD and twice Taoiseach (died 1976).
- 3 July
  - Arthur Blair-White, cricketer (died 1975).
  - Bridget Dowling, Adolf Hitler's sister-in-law via her marriage to Alois Hitler Jr. (died 1969 in the United States).
- 6 August – Billy Gillespie, soccer player (died 1981).
- 23 October – John Caffrey, recipient of the Victoria Cross for gallantry in 1915 near La Brique, France (died 1953).
- 1 November – Peter J. Ward, Sinn Féin (later Cumann na nGaedheal) TD, member First Dáil (died 1970).
- 15 November – Willie Pearse, participant in Easter Rising, brother of Patrick Pearse (executed 1916).
- 6 December – James Ryan, Fianna Fáil TD Member of First Dáil and cabinet minister (died 1970).
- 24 December – Joseph O'Doherty, Sinn Féin MP, Fianna Fáil TD and Seanad member (died 1979).

== Deaths ==
- 5 May – William Connor Magee, Anglican clergyman, Archbishop of York (born 1821).
- 18 May – Thomas Grady, soldier, recipient of the Victoria Cross for gallantry at the siege of Sevastopoll in the Crimean War (1854) (born 1835).
- 15 June – James Patrick Mahon, Irish nationalist politician and international mercenary (born 1800).
- 6 October – Charles Stewart Parnell, political leader (born 1846).
- 28 November – William James Lendrim, soldier, recipient of the Victoria Cross for gallantry at the siege of Sevastopoll in the Crimean War (1855) (born 1830).
- 12 December – Alexander Workman, politician in Canada and mayor of Ottawa (born 1798).
- 13 December – William Gorman Wills, dramatist and painter (born 1828).
- Full date unknown – Augustus Nicholas Burke, artist (born 1838).

== See also ==
- 1891 in Scotland
- 1891 in Wales
