= 1847 in Ireland =

- Centuries: 17th; 18th; 19th; 20th; 21st
- Decades: 1820s; 1830s; 1840s; 1850s; 1860s
- See also: 1847 in the United Kingdom; Other events of 1847; List of years in Ireland

Events from the year 1847 in Ireland.

== Events ==
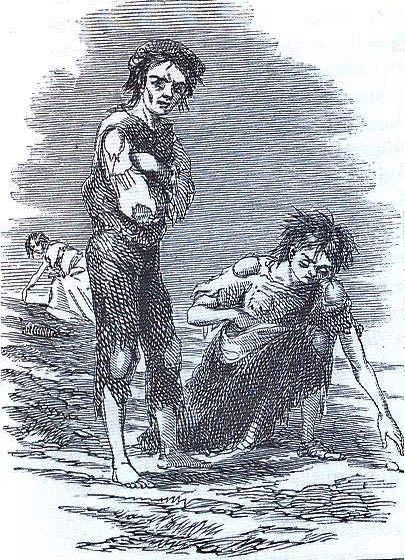
Skibbereen 1847 by Cork artist James Mahony, commissioned by the Illustrated London News.

- Ongoing – Great Famine. This summer's potato crop is free from blight, but inadequate due to small area sown. The British Relief Association is founded and raises money throughout England, the United States and Australia, with the help of the "Queen's Letters", two letters from Queen Victoria appealing for money to relieve the distress in Ireland. A group of Native American Choctaw is among those contributing to the relief effort. The Central Relief Committee of the Society of Friends (Quakers) also assists, but there are claims of "Souperism" (the provision of food in combination with proselytization) by other Protestant sectarian groups.
- 13 January – Irish Confederation established.
- February–September – soup kitchens system established under the Temporary Relief Act ("Soup Kitchen" or "Burgoyne's" Act); famine at its height.
- 24 March (starting 12 midday) – National Day of Fast and Humiliation for the Great Famine is held across the UK by royal proclamation.
- 12 April – the Massachusetts Donation of 1847 arrives at Cork on USS Jamestown.
- 28 April – the brig Exmouth carrying emigrants from Derry bound for Quebec is wrecked off Islay with only three survivors from more than 250 on board.
- May – typhus epidemic of 1847 among Irish emigrants arriving by ship in Canada.
- 15 May – death of political campaigner Daniel O'Connell, "The Emancipator", of cerebral softening in Genoa while on a pilgrimage to Rome at the age of 71. His heart is buried in Sant'Agata dei Goti, at this time chapel of the Irish College in Rome, and his body in Glasnevin Cemetery, Dublin, beneath a round tower.
- June – Poor Law Amendment Act. From August, the permanent Poor Law becomes responsible for providing relief of the destitute.
- 26 August – 1847 United Kingdom general election concludes with Repeal Association candidates receiving a majority of Irish votes, but the American Charles MacTavish's election in Dundalk will be overturned on appeal.
- Summer – extension of Courtown pier, the first application for such a structure of Alexander Mitchell's screw-pile foundations.
- December – John Mitchel breaks away from The Nation.
- Robert Holmes publishes The Case of Ireland Stated, proposing repeal of the Acts of Union 1800.

== Arts and literature ==
- March – Anthony Trollope's first novel, The Macdermots of Ballycloran, largely written at Drumsna between September 1843 and June 1845 and with a contemporary Irish setting, is published in London.
- Charles Lever's novel The Knight of Gwynne, a tale of the time of the Union is published serially in London.
- Publishers Simms & McIntyre of Belfast introduce their Parlour Library of fiction reprints.

== Births ==
- 30 May – Alice Stopford Green, nationalist, historian and journalist (died 1929).
- 31 May – William Pirrie, 1st Viscount Pirrie, shipbuilder and businessman (died 1924).
- 17 June – Arthur Godley, 1st Baron Kilbracken, civil servant, Permanent Under-Secretary of State for India (died 1932).
- 15 July – J. J. Clancy, Member of Parliament, barrister and journalist (born 1928).
- 28 August – Norman Garstin, artist (died 1926).
- 20 September – Michael Cusack, founder of the Gaelic Athletic Association (died 1906).
- 9 October – John Coleman, United States Marine, recipient of Medal of Honor for his actions in 1871 during the Korean Expedition (died 1897).
- 8 November – Bram Stoker, writer and author of Dracula (died 1912).
- 10 November – Edward Guinness, 1st Earl of Iveagh, philanthropist and businessman (died 1927).
- 15 November – James O'Neill, actor, father of the American playwright Eugene O'Neill (died 1920).
- 12 December – John O'Kane Murray, physician and author (died 1885).
  Full date unknown
  - Denis Kearney, politician in America (died 1907).
  - Sydney Mary Thompson, geologist and botanist (died 1923).

== Deaths ==
- 11 February – Andrew Clarke, soldier, Governor of Western Australia (born 1793).
- February – Michael John Brenan, priest and ecclesiastical historian (born 1780).
- April – Thomas Barnwall Martin, soldier, landowner and politician (born 1784).
- 15 May – Daniel O'Connell, politician, campaigner for Catholic emancipation and Repeal of the Union (born 1775).
- 7 August – James Daly, 1st Baron Dunsandle and Clanconal, politician (born 1782).
- 10 September – Richard Henry Wilde, lawyer and Congressman in USA (born 1789).
- 14 September – Sir John Burke, 2nd Baronet, soldier and politician (born 1782).
  Full date unknown
  - James Hope, United Irishmen leader who fought in the Irish Rebellion of 1798 and 1803 rebellion (born 1764).

== See also ==
- 1847 in Scotland
- 1847 in Wales
