= 1839 in Ireland =

- Centuries: 17th; 18th; 19th; 20th; 21st
- Decades: 1810s; 1820s; 1830s; 1840s; 1850s
- See also: 1839 in the United Kingdom; Other events of 1839; List of years in Ireland

Events from the year 1839 in Ireland.

== Events ==
- 6–7 January - Night of the Big Wind: a severe windstorm sweeps across Ireland killing hundreds and leaving thousands homeless.
- 22 June - The Earl of Belfast lays the foundation stone for the Palm House in Belfast Botanic Gardens.
- 12 August - The Ulster Railway is opened between Belfast and Lisburn.
- 5 December - Uniform Fourpenny Post introduced in United Kingdom of Great Britain and Ireland, a major postal reform, whereby fourpence is levied for pre-paid letters up to half an ounce in weight instead of postage being calculated by distance and number of sheets of paper.

== Arts and literature ==
- Charles Lever's The Confessions of Harry Lorrequer is published in Dublin.

== Births ==
- 6 January - Arthur Gore, 5th Earl of Arran, Anglo-Irish peer and diplomat (died 1901).
- 16 March - John Butler Yeats, artist and father of W. B. Yeats and Jack Butler Yeats (died 1922).
- 27 March - John Ballance, 14th Premier of New Zealand (died 1893).
- 1 April - St. Clair Augustine Mulholland, American Civil War officer (died 1910).
- 7 April - David Baird, United States Senator from New Jersey from 1918 to 1919. (died 1927)
- 27 April - Charles Frederick Houghton, soldier and politician in Canada (died 1898).
- 10 May - Thomas Joseph Carr, second Roman Catholic Archbishop of Melbourne, Australia (died 1917).
- 11 July - William John Hennessy, artist (died 1917).
- 5 September - Sir Rowland Blennerhassett, 4th Baronet, Liberal Party MP (died 1909).
- 4 November - Thomas MacDonald Patterson, politician and newspaper publisher in the USA (died 1916).
- 24 November - James William Adams, recipient of the Victoria Cross for gallantry in 1879 at Killa Kazi, Afghanistan (died 1903).
- 30 December - John Todhunter, poet and playwright (died 1916).

=== Full date unknown ===
- William Lundon, Irish Parliamentary Party MP (died 1909).
- John Pentland Mahaffy, classicist (died 1919).
- Thomas Murphy, recipient of the Victoria Cross for bravery at sea in saving life in a storm off the Andaman Islands in 1867 (died 1900).

== Deaths ==
- 18 November - Hans Blackwood, 3rd Baron Dufferin and Claneboye (born 1758).
- Gideon Ouseley, Methodism's 'apostle to the Irish' (born 1762).
