= 1837 in Ireland =

- Centuries: 17th; 18th; 19th; 20th; 21st
- Decades: 1810s; 1820s; 1830s; 1840s; 1850s
- See also: 1837 in the United Kingdom; Other events of 1837; List of years in Ireland

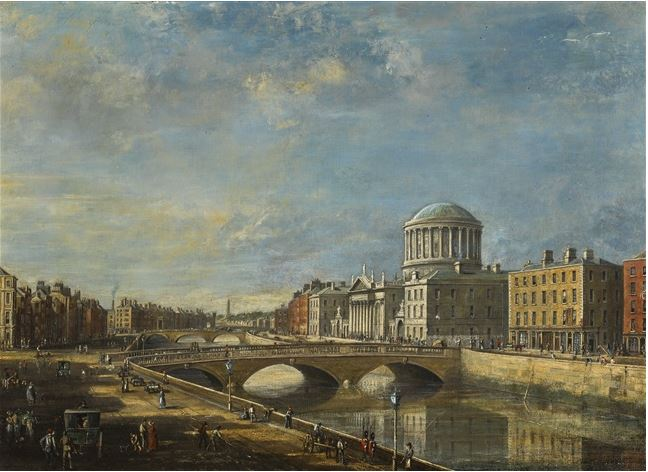
The Four Courts and the river Liffey, Dublin 1837

Events from the year 1837 in Ireland.

== Events ==
- Shaw's Bank merges with the Royal Bank of Ireland (later to become one of the Allied Irish Banks).
- 8 April - Low-water mark datum measured at Poolbeg Lighthouse by the Ordnance Survey.
- August – following a very cold summer there is widespread failure of the potato crop, as in 1836, leading to famine later in the year.
- 18 August – the Roman Catholic Tuam Cathedral is dedicated.
- 4 September – HMS Terror (1813), badly damaged during an Arctic expedition, is beached at Lough Swilly to save her.

== Arts and literature ==
- February – Charles Lever begins publishing his fictional The Confessions of Harry Lorrequer in Dublin University Magazine.
- Thomas Crofton Croker publishes Popular Songs of Ireland.
- Tyrone Power stages and acts in the Irish-themed plays St. Patrick's Eve (written by himself) and Rory O'More (adapted from Samuel Lover's novel).

== Births ==
- 16 March – Frederick Wolseley, inventor of the sheep shearing machine (died 1899 in the United Kingdom).
- 7 May – John Michael Clancy, Democrat United States Representative from New York (died 1903 in the United States).
- 24 May – John McDonald, soldier and Congressman in America (died 1917 in the United States).
- 28 May – George Ashlin, architect (died 1921).
- 1 August (bapt.) – Mary Harris Jones ("Mother Jones"), labor leader in America (died 1930 in the United States).
- 7 August
  - James Brenan, painter (died 1907).
  - Allan James Foley ("Signor Foli"), operatic bass singer (died 1899 in the United Kingdom).
- 4 September – Edward Gibson, 1st Baron Ashbourne, lawyer and Lord Chancellor of Ireland (died 1913).
- 1 October – Edward James Saunderson, leader of the Irish Unionist Party in the British House of Commons (died 1906).
  Full date unknown
  - Patrick Graham, recipient of the Victoria Cross for gallantry in 1857 at Lucknow, India (died 1875).

== Deaths ==
- 20 January – Arthur Gore, 3rd Earl of Arran, politician (born 1761).
- 23 January – John Field, composer and pianist (born 1782).
- 1 February – Edward Donovan, writer, traveller and amateur zoologist (born 1768).
- 27 February – Lord Kingsborough, antiquarian (born 1795).
- 20 June – William IV of the United Kingdom of Great Britain and Ireland (born 1765).
- 13 July – William Hare, 1st Earl of Listowel, peer and MP (born 1751).
- 24 November – Richard Trench, 2nd Earl of Clancarty, diplomat, Irish, and later British, MP (born 1767).
  Full date unknown
  - Gilbert Austin, educator, clergyman and author (Rborn 1753).

== See also ==
- 1837 in Scotland
- 1837 in Wales
