= 1836 in Ireland =

- Centuries: 17th; 18th; 19th; 20th; 21st
- Decades: 1810s; 1820s; 1830s; 1840s; 1850s
- See also: 1836 in the United Kingdom; Other events of 1836; List of years in Ireland

Events from the year 1836 in Ireland.

== Events ==
- 30 January – the Intrinsic sinks off Kilkee with the loss of all fourteen on board.
- February – foundation of the Ulster Bank in Belfast.
- 4 April – Daniel O'Connell gives a speech on "Justice for Ireland".
- 4 May – the Ancient Order of Hibernians, an Irish Catholic fraternal organization, is founded in New York City.
- 23 May – Irish Constabulary Act provides central organisation for the police in Ireland; an Act of 4 July provides for formation of a Dublin Police Office.
- 4 June – The Sligo Champion newspaper is first published.
- August – following one of the coldest summers in over fifty years there is widespread failure of the potato crop.
- 19 September – first burial at Mount Jerome Cemetery in Harold's Cross, Dublin, a commercial Protestant burial ground.
- End of Tithe War.
- Foundation of the Royal Bank of Ireland, a constituent of Allied Irish Banks.
- Foundation of the Ulster Society for the Prevention of Cruelty to Animals.
- Irish emigration to Montevideo, Uruguay, peaks.

== Arts and literature ==
- Francis Sylvester Mahony's light verse The Reliques of Father Prout published.

== Births ==
- 17 January – William MacCormac, surgeon (died 1901).
- 16 February – Robert Halpin, master mariner (died 1894).
- May – Thomas Lane, recipient of the Victoria Cross for gallantry in 1860 at the Taku Forts, China (died 1889).
- 9 June – Henry Arthur McArdle, painter in the United States (died 1908).
- 27 June – Walter Moxon, prominent physician (died 1886).
- 10 October – Dalton McCarthy, lawyer and politician in Canada (died 1898).
- Lot Flannery, sculptor in the United States (died 1922).

== Deaths ==
- 31 March – Edward Southwell Ruthven, Repealer politician and member of the United Kingdom Parliament (b. c. 1772)
- 8 August – James Blackwood, 2nd Baron Dufferin and Claneboye, politician (born 1755).
- 21 August – William Cusac Smith, Baronet, judge (born 1766)

== See also ==
- 1836 in Scotland
- 1836 in Wales
