= 1781 in Ireland =

- Centuries: 16th; 17th; 18th; 19th; 20th
- Decades: 1760s; 1770s; 1780s; 1790s; 1800s
- See also: Other events of 1781; List of years in Ireland

Events from the year 1781 in Ireland.

== Incumbent ==
- Monarch: George III

== Events ==
- 8 August – construction of the Custom House, Dublin, to the design of James Gandon, begins.

== Arts and literature ==
- First annual Granard harp festival.

== Births ==
- 6 February – John Keane, 1st Baron Keane, British Army Lieutenant-General (died 1844).
- 25 December? – Sydney Owenson, novelist (died 1859).
- William Benjamin Sarsfield Taylor, painter (died 1850).

== Deaths ==
- 26 September – Andrew Lewis, pioneer and surveyor, soldier from Virginia (born 1720).
