= 1832 in Ireland =

- Centuries: 17th; 18th; 19th; 20th; 21st
- Decades: 1810s; 1820s; 1830s; 1840s; 1850s
- See also: 1832 in the United Kingdom; Other events of 1832; List of years in Ireland

Events from the year 1832 in Ireland.

== Events ==
- 21 February – Glasnevin Cemetery is opened as a nondenominational burial ground in Dublin following campaigning by Daniel O'Connell; the first burial takes place the following day.
- 7 August – the Representation of the People (Ireland) Act, 1832, commonly called the Irish Reform Act 1832, introduces wide-ranging changes to the laws for elections to the Parliament of the United Kingdom, particularly in the Boroughs.
- The Ballast Bank in Wexford Harbour is built.

== Arts and literature ==
- January – Theatre Royal, Wexford opened.

== Births ==
- 6 May – Margaret Anna Cusack, nun, writer and founder of the Sisters of St. Joseph of Peace (died 1899 in England).
- 10 May – William Russell Grace, businessman and first Roman Catholic mayor of New York (died 1904 in the United States).
- 19 May – Standish Hayes O'Grady, antiquarian (died 1915 in England).
- 27 May – Catherine Drew, journalist (died 1910 in England)
- September – John Byrne, soldier, recipient of the Victoria Cross for gallantry in 1854 at the Battle of Inkerman, Crimea (died 1879 in Wales).
- 30 September – Charlotte Riddell, née Cowan, novelist and editor (died 1906 in England).
- 11 November – Martin Murphy, civil engineer (died 1926 in Canada).
- 14 November – Stopford Brooke, independent preacher and writer (died 1916 in England).

=== Full date unknown ===
- Patrick Carlin, Victoria Cross soldier, recipient of the Victoria Cross for gallantry in 1858 in India (died 1895).
- Thomas McCarthy, businessman and politician in Quebec (died 1870 in Canada).
- Joseph Ward, recipient of the Victoria Cross for gallantry in 1858 at Gwalior, India (died 1872).

== Deaths ==
- 20 January – Alexander Nimmo, civil engineer and geologist, working in Ireland since 1811 (born 1783 in Scotland).
- 8 April – Andrew Blayney, 11th Baron Blayney, soldier, politician and peer (born 1770).
- 18 September – Henry Boyd, poet, literary translator and vicar (born c1750).
- 28 December – Henry Conyngham, 1st Marquess Conyngham, politician (born 1766).

== See also ==
- 1832 in Scotland
- 1832 in Wales
