= 1925 in Ireland =

- Centuries: 18th; 19th; 20th; 21st
- Decades: 1900s; 1910s; 1920s; 1930s; 1940s
- See also: 1925 in Northern Ireland; Other events of 1925; List of years in Ireland

Events from the year 1925 in Ireland.

== Incumbents ==
- Governor-General: Tim Healy
- President of the Executive Council: W. T. Cosgrave (CnaG)
- Vice-President of the Executive Council: Kevin O'Higgins (CnaG)
- Minister for Finance: Ernest Blythe (CnaG)
- Chief Justice: Hugh Kennedy
- Dáil: 4th
- Seanad:
  - 1922 Seanad (until 5 December 1925)
  - 1925 Seanad (from 6 December 1925)

== Events ==
- 11 February – in the Dáil a resolution is passed making it illegal for any citizen to secure a divorce with the right to remarry in the State.
- 10 March – the Prime Minister of Northern Ireland, James Craig, announces the impending dissolution of the parliament. He says the election will be fought on the Boundary Commission issue.
- 16 March – at a meeting of the Irish Boundary Commission in County Down, witnesses from Newry and Kilkeel support being included in the Irish Free State.
- 2 April – the Dublin Metropolitan Police merges with the Civic Guard under a new Act. The new organisation will be known as the Garda Síochána.
- 3 April – the Dáil accepts the government's motion on the Shannon Power Scheme, building a giant hydroelectric dam (with fish ladders for the Shannon's vital salmon) at Ardnacrusha. Siemens-Schuckert will be the contractors.
- 26 May – the Shannon Electricity Bill is passed in Dáil Éireann. £5.2 million is needed to finance the scheme.
- 11 June – the Irish Seanad debate on divorce took place, specifically whether to permit private Bills granting divorce, and was a major constitutional, religious, and cultural controversy in the early Irish Free State
- 1 July – it is announced that Alexander Hull & Co., building contractors, are to re-build the General Post Office, Dublin at a cost of £50,000.
- 9 July – in Dublin, Oonagh Keogh becomes the first female member of a stock exchange in the world.
- 5 August – Annie Walsh becomes the last woman to be executed in Ireland; she had murdered her husband.
- 7 November – The Morning Post, a Conservative London newspaper, publishes a leaked report of the Irish Boundary Commission's (limited) proposals for altering the border between the Free State and Northern Ireland, which are contrary to the Free State's view; publication effectively ends the work of the commission.
- 3 December – a settlement on the boundary question between the Irish Free State and Northern Ireland is presented in London. Controversially, there is no change to the border, in exchange for the Free State's liability for service of the U.K. public debt in respect of war pensions being dropped. The agreement is approved during this month by the U.K. and Free State legislatures.
- Tuam workhouse becomes the Bon Secours Mother and Baby Home, a Magdalene asylum.

== Arts and literature ==
- 6 March – establishment of An Gúm as part of the Department of Education by Ernest Blythe, Minister for Finance, to promote publications in Irish.
- Ernest Blythe, Minister for Finance, arranges an annual government subsidy of £850 for the Abbey Theatre in Dublin, making it the first state-supported theatre in the Anglophone world.
- George Bernard Shaw is awarded the Nobel Prize in Literature.
- Peadar O'Donnell's first novel, Storm, is published.
- Liam O'Flaherty's novel The Informer, set in Dublin in the aftermath of the Civil War, is published and wins the James Tait Black Memorial Prize in fiction.

== Sport ==
=== Association football ===
- League of Ireland
  Winners: Shamrock Rovers
  FAI Cup
  Winners: Shamrock Rovers 2–1 Shelbourne

=== Gaelic games ===
- The All-Ireland Champions are Tipperary (hurling) and Galway (football)

=== Yachting ===
- First Fastnet Race

== Births ==
- 3 January – Maureen Potter, singer, actress and comedian (died 2004).
- 25 January – Willie John Daly, Cork hurler.
- 1 May – Edmund Fitzgibbon, Bishop of the Roman Catholic Diocese of Warri in Nigeria (died 2010).
- 17 May – Michael Herbert, Fianna Fáil TD and MEP (died 2006).
- 27 May – Martin O'Toole, Fianna Fáil TD and senator (died 2013).
- 2 June – Mick Ryan, Tipperary hurler (died 2007).
- 3 June – Tom Scannell, soccer player (died 1993).
- 16 June – Ian Anderson, President of the Legislative Council (Isle of Man) (died 2005).
- 16 July – Joe Lynch, actor (died 2001).
- 20 July – Martin Molony, jockey (died 2017).
- 26 August – Thomas Finnegan, Roman Catholic Bishop of Killala, 1987–2002 (died 2011).
- 28 August – Robin Lawler, soccer player (died 1981).
- 1 September – Michael J. Cleary, Roman Catholic Bishop of the Diocese of Banjul, Gambia (died 2020).
- 3 September – Maureen Haughey, née Lemass, wife of Charles Haughey (died 2017).
- 4 September – Nick O'Donnell, Kilkenny and Wexford hurler (died 1988).
- 15 September – Jerry Cronin, Fianna Fáil TD, Cabinet Minister and MEP (died 1990).
- 16 September – Charles Haughey, Taoiseach and leader of Fianna Fáil (died 2006).
- 1 October – Brendan O'Dowda, tenor singer (died 2002).
- 18 October
  - George Colley, Fianna Fáil TD, holder of six Ministerial posts including Tánaiste (died 1983).
  - Jimmy Reardon, Olympic sprinter (died 2019).
- 30 October – Reg Ryan, soccer player (died 1997).
- 26 November – Ciarán Mac Mathúna, broadcaster and music collector (died 2009).
- 22 December – Lewis Glucksman, businessman, philanthropist, patron of the Lewis Glucksman Gallery at UCC (died 2006).

== Deaths ==
- 17 February – George Sigerson, surgeon and writer, member of the 1922 Seanad.
- 7 June – Matt Talbot, manual labourer and ascetic (born 1856).
- 22 June – Matthew Gibney, priest, in 1880 in Australia, tended the seemingly seriously wounded Ned Kelly, heard his confession and gave him the last rites (born 1835).
- 27 October – Darrell Figgis, writer, Sinn Féin activist and independent politician (born 1882).
- 28 October – George W. Joy, painter (born 1844).
- 4 November – Paddy Hannan, gold prospector whose discovery in 1893 near Kalgoorlie, Western Australia set off a gold rush (born 1840).
- 6 November – Eglantyne Louisa Jebb, social reformer (born 1845).
- c. November – Percy Hetherington Fitzgerald, literary biographer, drama critic and sculptor (born 1834).
