= John Brenan (physician) =

Irish physician

John Brenan (c.1768–1830) was an Irish physician.

Brenan was born in Ballaghide, Carlow, Ireland, about 1768, was the youngest of six children. His father, a Roman Catholic, possessed some property. Brenan's earliest literary productions appear to have been epigrams and short poems, which he contributed to Dublin periodicals in 1793. He graduated as doctor of medicine in Glasgow, and established himself in that profession in Dublin about 1801.

For some time, he was a contributor of verses in the Irish Magazine, founded in Dublin in 1807 by Walter Cox. Cox was tried in Dublin in 1812 for publishing a production in favour of a repeal of the union between Great Britain and Ireland, and condemned to stand in the pillory and to be imprisoned for twelve months. While Cox was in gaol under this sentence, Brenan quarrelled with him, went over to the opposite party, and started the 'Milesian Magazine, or Irish Monthly Gleaner.' The first number appeared in April 1812, and in it and subsequent issues he assailed Cox with great acerbity.

Brenan was ardently devoted to gymnastics, an expert wrestler, and occasionally showed symptoms of mental disorder. In 1812, puerperal fever and internal inflammation prevailed to a vast extent in Dublin. Brenan discovered a valuable remedy in preparations of turpentine, with which he successfully treated many cases.

The greater part of the medical practice in Dublin at that time was in the hands of the College of Physicians. An old bylaw of the college forbidding members to hold consultations with non-members was, according to Brenan, put in operation to curtail his practice. Brenan stated that the Dublin physicians declined to use his remedy from personal jealousy. It was, however, adopted by practitioners with success in the country parts of Ireland, as well as in England and Scotland.

In 1813, Brenan published at Dublin a pamphlet entitled 'Essay on Child-bed Fever, with remarks on it, as it appeared in the Lying-in Hospital of Dublin, in January 1813, &c.' In this publication he attacked the College of Physicians. He followed up the attack with a series of articles, both in verse and prose, in the 'Milesian Magazine,' in which he satirised the prominent members of that college.

Brenan also attacked persons agitating for Catholic emancipation. A government pension was alleged to have been given for these productions.

Many of Brenan's satires were in the form of adaptations in verse of passages from the Latin classics, which he applied with much poignancy. Among these was an elaborate piece on Daniel O'Connell, who was in the early stages of his career.

The 'Milesian Magazine' was published at long intervals. The last number, which appears to have been that printed in 1825, contained a letter which Brenan addressed to the Marquis of Wellesley, lord-lieutenant of Ireland, advocating an inquiry into the administration of the Lying-in Hospital at Dublin, and stating the circumstances of his discovery in connection with turpentine. Brenan's death took place at Dublin in July 1830.
