= 1835 in Ireland =

- Centuries: 17th; 18th; 19th; 20th; 21st
- Decades: 1810s; 1820s; 1830s; 1840s; 1850s
- See also: 1835 in the United Kingdom; Other events of 1835; List of years in Ireland

Events from the year 1835 in Ireland.

== Events ==
- May 13 – British barque Neva, transporting female convicts from Cork to Australia, is wrecked in the Bass Strait with the loss of 224 people and only 15 survivors.
- August 5 – Wellesley Bridge opened across the River Shannon in Limerick.
- August 28 – St. Vincent's Ecclesiastical Seminary, a predecessor of Castleknock College, is founded by the Vincentian community in Castleknock.
- September – Eagle Island lighthouses become operational.
- December 3 – Limerick-owned barque Francis Spaight is badly damaged homebound from Newfoundland and the surviving crew resort to cannibalism at sea to escape starvation before being rescued.
- Drenagh House in Limavady, County Londonderry, is completed for the McCausland family. It is architect Charles Lanyon's first major commission.
- Quaker entrepreneur Charles Bewley lands an unprecedented cargo of 2,000 chests of tea shipped directly from China to Dublin, thereby breaking the East India Company's monopoly in the commodity.
- The Herdman brothers begin flax spinning at Sion Mills in County Tyrone.
- The Grand Hotel at Malahide opens for business and has been in continuous use as a hotel ever since.
- The remains of Jonathan Swift are uncovered during work on St Patrick's Cathedral, Dublin, and inspected by William Wilde, an apprentice surgeon at this time.
- Two sections of Moone High Cross are unearthed whilst works are being carried out in the graveyard of the ruined Abbey of Moone. Charles FitzGerald, Duke of Leinster, arranges for the re-erection of the cross.

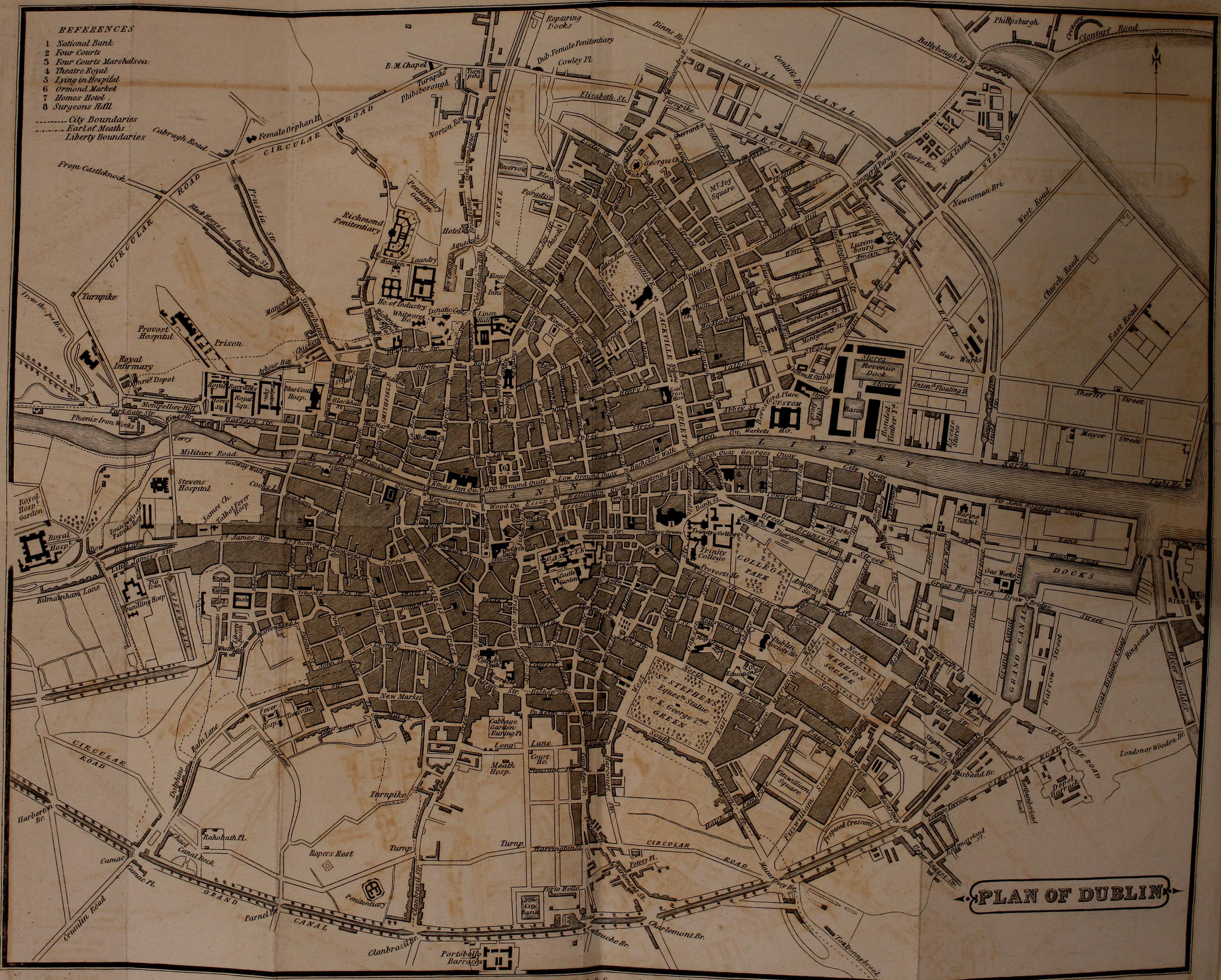
Map of Dublin, 1835.

== Births ==
- 20 February – Robert Hart, British diplomat and official in the Imperial Chinese government (died 1911 in England).
- 9 April – Somerset Lowry-Corry, 4th Earl Belmore, soldier, politician and Lord Lieutenant for County Tyrone (died 1913).
- 3 June – Eliza Lynch, First Lady of Paraguay (died 1886).
- 1 July – Samuel McCaughey, pastoralist, politician and philanthropist in Australia (died 1919).
- 7 July – Richard Mayne, British admiral, explorer and MP (died 1892).
- 4 September – Abraham Boulger, soldier, recipient of the Victoria Cross for gallantry in 1857 at Lucknow, India (died 1900).
- 18 September – Thomas Grady, soldier, recipient of the Victoria Cross for gallantry in 1854 at Sebastopol, the Crimea (died 1891).
- November – Matthew Gibney, priest, in 1880 in Australia, tended the seemingly seriously wounded Ned Kelly, heard his confession and gave him the last rites (died 1925).

== Deaths ==
- 15 September – Alexander McDonnell, chess master (born 1798).
- 25 December – Antoine Ó Raifteirí, Irish language poet, "last of the wandering bards" (born 1779).

== See also ==
- 1835 in Scotland
- 1835 in Wales
