= 1848 in Ireland =

- Centuries: 17th; 18th; 19th; 20th; 21st
- Decades: 1820s; 1830s; 1840s; 1850s; 1860s
- See also: 1848 in the United Kingdom; Other events of 1848; List of years in Ireland

The Irish Tricolour

Events from the year 1848 in Ireland.

== Events ==
- Ongoing – Great Famine: Potato blight returns and outbreaks of cholera are reported.
- Early – publication of the first complete parallel-text edition of Annals of the Four Masters begins in Dublin as Annála Ríoghachta Éireann: Annals of the Kingdom of Ireland by the Four Masters, from the earliest period to the year 1616. Edited from MSS in the Library of the Royal Irish Academy and of Trinity College Dublin with a translation and copious notes by John O'Donovan.
- February – John Mitchel publishes The United Irishman, a weekly Irish nationalist newspaper. It is suppressed and Mitchel arrested and convicted under the Treason Felony Act 1848 on 26 May and sentenced to transportation to Australia.
- 7 March – Thomas Francis Meagher flies the Irish Tricolour in Waterford, the first recorded usage of the flag which is now the national flag of the Republic of Ireland.
- 25 April – Andrew Graham discovers asteroid 9 Metis from politician Edward Joshua Cooper's private Markree Observatory in County Sligo, the first (and until 2008 only) discovery from Ireland of a minor planet.
- 12 May – Waterford and Kilkenny Railway opens between Kilkenny and Thomastown.
- June – medical students Kevin Izod O'Doherty and Richard D'Alton Williams, and chemist Thomas Antisell, publish the Irish Tribune, a weekly Irish nationalist newspaper. It is suppressed after five issues and the editors arrested on 10 July. O'Doherty is convicted under the Treason Felony Act after a third trial on 30 October and sentenced to transportation to Australia; Williams is acquitted two days later.
- July – famine victims on outdoor relief peak this month at almost 840,000 people.
- 22 July – Government suspends habeas corpus, thus Young Irelanders can be imprisoned on proclamation without trial.
- 29 July – Young Irelander Rebellion at Ballingarry in County Tipperary is broken up by the Irish Constabulary.
- October – Patrick Kennedy (1823–1858) starts out from County Wexford to emigrate to the United States where he will establish the politically significant Kennedy family.
- Completion of palm houses at Kew Gardens, London, and the National Botanic Gardens, Glasnevin, by Richard Turner of Dublin.
- Origin, in Grafton Street, Dublin, of the Brown Thomas department store chain.

== Arts and literature ==
- Irish Academy of Music founded in Dublin.
- Cecil Frances Alexander's Hymns for Little Children published in aid of the Derry and Raphoe Diocesan Institution for the Deaf and Dumb, Strabane.
- Anthony Trollope's novel The Kellys and the O'Kellys, written and set in Ireland, is published in London.

== Births ==
- 3 January – Rose La Touche, muse of John Ruskin (died 1875).
- 18 February – Samuel Jacob Jackson, politician in Canada (died 1942).
- 1 March – Augustus Saint-Gaudens, sculptor (died 1907).
- 22 March – Sarah Purser, painter and stained-glass maker (died 1943).
- 2 April – O'Moore Creagh, soldier, recipient of the Victoria Cross for gallantry in 1879 at Kam Dakka, Afghanistan (died 1923).
- 5 May – John Nesbitt Kirchhoffer, lawyer and politician in Canada (died 1914).
- 12 May – James E. Morin, merchant and politician in Ontario.
- 11 June – Reginald Clare Hart, soldier, recipient of the Victoria Cross for gallantry in 1879 in the Bazar Valley, Afghanistan (died 1931).
- 29 June – Paul Boyton, extreme water sports pioneer (died 1924 in the United States).
- 28 July – James Cooney, lawyer and Democratic politician in Missouri (died 1904 in the United States).
- 10 August – William Harnett, painter (died 1892).
- 14 August – Margaret Lindsay Huggins, astronomer (died 1915)
- 28 August – Francis O'Neill, Chicago police officer and collector of Irish traditional music (died 1936 in the United States).
- 4 September – George Edward Dobson, zoologist, photographer and army surgeon (died 1895).
- 5 October – T. P. O'Connor, journalist and Member of Parliament (died 1929).

== Deaths ==
- 10 April – William Quarter, first Roman Catholic bishop of Chicago (born 1806).
- 3 May – Cornelius Heeney, merchant and politician in America (born 1754).

== See also ==
- 1848 in Scotland
- 1848 in Wales
