= 1840 in Ireland =

- Centuries: 17th; 18th; 19th; 20th; 21st
- Decades: 1820s; 1830s; 1840s; 1850s; 1860s
- See also: 1840 in the United Kingdom; Other events of 1840; List of years in Ireland

Events from the year 1840 in Ireland.

== Events ==
- 10 January – Uniform Penny Post introduced.
- 1 April – Theatre Royal, Cork burns down.
- 19 May – foundation stone of the Roman Catholic St Mel's cathedral, Longford, is laid.
- 10 July – General Assembly of the Presbyterian Church in Ireland established.
- 28 July – first permanent presence of the Church of Jesus Christ of Latter-day Saints in Ireland when Mormon missionaries John Taylor, William Black and James McGuffie arrive to work in the Newry, Lisburn and Belfast areas. On 31 July Thomas Tait becomes the first convert baptised in Ireland, at Loughbrickland.
- The Palm House in Belfast Botanic Gardens is completed, constructed by Richard Turner of Dublin. It is one of the earliest examples of a curvilinear cast iron glasshouse in the world.
- Bewley's established as tea and coffee importers.

Full date unknown

- Samuel Kelly, started his business as a "grocers and commission coal merchant" on Queen's Quay, Belfast, that would go on to become John Kelly Limited.

== Arts and literature ==
- Edward Bunting's The Ancient Music of Ireland is published, incorporating "A Dissertation on the Irish Harp and Harpers, Including an Account of the Old Melodies of Ireland".

== Births ==
- 1 January – Patrick Walsh, journalist, politician and mayor of Augusta, Georgia (died 1899).
- 4 January – Bishop Richard Owens, Bishop of Clogher 1894–1909 (died 1909).
- 8 January – Henry Arthur Blake, British colonial administrator and Governor of Hong Kong (died 1918).
- 17 January – William Pery, 3rd Earl of Limerick, peer (died 1896).
- 27 February – Thomas Kelly-Kenny, British Army general who served in the Second Boer War (died 1914).
- 29 February – John Philip Holland, engineer, developed the first Royal Navy submarine (died 1914).
- 25 March – Myles Keogh, officer in American Civil War, later in U.S. 7th Cavalry Regiment, killed at the Battle of the Little Bighorn (died 1876).
- 26 April (bapt.) – Paddy Hannan, gold prospector whose discovery in 1893 near Kalgoorlie, Western Australia set off a gold rush (died 1925).
- 27 April – Tom Gallaher, tobacco manufacturer (died 1927).
- 23 May – George Throssell, second Premier of Western Australia (died 1910).
- 20 September – Ellen Mary Clerke, author, journalist, poet and science writer (died 1906).
- 1 November – Arthur Guinness, Baron Ardilaun, businessman, politician, and philanthropist (died 1915).
- 17 November – Lawrence Parsons, 4th Earl of Rosse, eighteenth Chancellor of the University of Dublin (d.(1908).
- 28 December – Thomas Hovenden, artist and teacher (died 1895).
  Full date unknown
  - William Abraham, Irish Nationalist MP (died 1915).
  - Timothy J. Campbell, Democrat U.S. Representative from New York (died 1904).
  - John Kelly, coal merchant of John Kelly Limited (died 1904).
  - Timothy H. O'Sullivan, photographer in the United States (died 1882)

== Deaths ==
- 15 April – Thomas Drummond, military surveyor and Under-Secretary for Ireland (born 1797 in Scotland).
- 21 April – Standish O'Grady, 1st Viscount Guillamore, Lord Chief Baron of the Exchequer in Ireland (born 1766).
- 12 June – Gerald Griffin, novelist, poet and playwright (born 1803).
- 20 August – George Canning, 1st Baron Garvagh, politician (born 1778).

== See also ==
- 1840 in Scotland
- 1840 in Wales
