= 1852 in Ireland =

- Centuries: 17th; 18th; 19th; 20th; 21st
- Decades: 1830s; 1840s; 1850s; 1860s; 1870s
- See also: 1852 in the United Kingdom; Other events of 1852; List of years in Ireland

Events from the year 1852 in Ireland.

== Events ==
- 5 January – the troopship HMS Birkenhead boards British Army recruits at Queenstown. It has insufficient lifeboats.
- 26 February – the Birkenhead founders off the coast of South Africa. The soldiers stand to attention while women and children are placed in the lifeboats.
- 10 June
  - The 18-arch Craigmore Viaduct near Newry on the Dublin-Belfast railway line is opened (construction began in 1849).
  - The Irish Industrial Exhibition is opened in Cork.
- 1 October – Patent Law Amendment Act comes into effect in the United Kingdom, merging the English, Scottish and Irish patent systems.
- 1 December – The foundation stone of the Campanile in Trinity College Dublin was laid.

== Full date unknown ==
- Eglington Pauper Lunatic Asylum opened in Cork.
- End of the Great Famine. In the period it has lasted since 1845, one million people have emigrated from Ireland. The Irish now make up a quarter of the population of Liverpool, Boston, New York, Philadelphia and Baltimore; and a half of Toronto.
- Tenant farmer Michael O'Regan emigrates from County Tipperary to London. He will become paternal great-grandfather to Ronald Reagan, President of the United States.
- Samuel Kelly establishes his coal merchant's business as Samuel Kelly Coal Merchant on the Coal Quay, Belfast.

== Arts and literature ==
- Edmund Falconer produces his first collection of poems Man’s Mission: A Pilgrimage to Glory’s Goal whilst working as a jobbing actor.

== Sport ==
- Curragh golf course is laid out, the first in Ireland.
- Leinster Cricket Club is founded in Rathgar.

== Births ==
- 25 January – Nevill Coghill, posthumous recipient of the Victoria Cross for gallantry at the Battle of Isandhlwana, South Africa (died 1879).
- 28 January – Louis Brennan, inventor (died 1932).
- 2 February – Lawrence E. McGann, Democrat U.S. Representative from Illinois (died 1928).
- 24 February – George Moore, novelist, poet, art critic and dramatist (died 1933).
- 29 February – Frank Gavan Duffy, fourth Chief Justice of the High Court of Australia (died 1936).
- 15 March – Augusta, Lady Gregory, dramatist and folklorist (died 1932).
- 17 March – Patrick Augustine Sheehan, priest, author and political activist (died 1913).
- 27 March – Jim Connell, political activist, writer of The Red Flag (died 1929).
- 9 April (bapt.) – Laurence Ginnell, nationalist, lawyer and politician, member of First Dáil (died 1923).
- 28 July – Barton McGuckin, tenor singer (died 1913).
- 30 September – Charles Villiers Stanford, composer (died 1924).
- 2 October – William O'Brien, nationalist, journalist, agrarian agitator, social revolutionary, politician, party leader, newspaper publisher and author (died 1928).

== Deaths ==
- 25 February – Thomas Moore, poet, singer, songwriter and entertainer (born 1779).
- 25 April – Arthur O'Connor, United Irishman and later general in Napoleon's army (born 1763).
- 8 May – Charles Rowan, joint first Commissioner of Police of the Metropolis, head of the London Metropolitan Police (b. c1782).
- 14 September – Arthur Wellesley, 1st Duke of Wellington, soldier and statesman (born 1769).
  Full date unknown
  - Edward Bransfield, master in the Royal Navy (born 1785).
  - William Thompson, naturalist (born 1805).
  - Elliot Warburton, travel writer and novelist (born 1810).

== See also ==
- 1852 in Scotland
- 1852 in Wales
