= 1850 in Ireland =

- Centuries: 17th; 18th; 19th; 20th; 21st
- Decades: 1830s; 1840s; 1850s; 1860s; 1870s
- See also: 1850 in the United Kingdom; Other events of 1850; List of years in Ireland

Events from the year 1850 in Ireland.

== Events ==
- Ongoing – Great Famine subsides.
- 31 March – the paddle steamer RMS Royal Adelaide (1838), bound from Cork to London, sinks in the English Channel with the loss of all 250 on board.
- October – Central Criminal Lunatic Asylum for Ireland opened in Dundrum, Dublin, the first secure hospital in Europe.
- 19 November – the barque Edmond sinks off Kilkee with the loss of 98 of the 216 aboard.
- Improved navigation of River Shannon throughout from Killaloe to Lough Key is completed.
- The Encumbered Estates Commissioners sell off remaining Donegall estate properties in Belfast to the tenants.
- Crumlin Road Courthouse in Belfast is completed.

== Arts and literature ==
- Brian Mac Giolla Meidhre's poem Cúirt An Mheán Oíche is first published from the oral tradition in an edition by the scholar John O'Daly.
- Tara Brooch (c.700 AD) found near Laytown, County Meath.

== Sport ==
- 27 February – Abd El Kader wins the Aintree Grand National in England, having been trained at Dardistown Castle by his owner, Joe Osborne.

== Deaths ==
- 10 January – William Reid Clanny, physician and inventor of the Clanny safety lamp for miners (born 1770).
- 6 August – Windham Quin, 2nd Earl of Dunraven and Mount-Earl, peer (born 1782).
- 13 August – Martin Archer Shee, painter (born 1769).
- 18 August – Charles Arbuthnot, Tory politician and member of the Privy Council (born 1767).
- 10 October – Jon Riley, deserter from United States Army, a founder of the San Patricios (born 1805).
- 29 December – William Hamilton Maxwell, novelist (born 1792).

== Births ==
- 25 April – William Melville, police officer and first chief of the British Secret Service (died 1918).
- 9 June – Pierce Charles de Lacy O'Mahony, Nationalist politician, barrister and philanthropist (died 1930).
- 24 June – Herbert Kitchener, 1st Earl Kitchener, British Field Marshal and statesman (drowned 1916).
- 17 July – Edmond Holmes, educationalist, writer on religion and poet (died 1936).
- 12 September – James Bernard, 4th Earl of Bandon, Deputy Lieutenant in Ireland (died 1924).
- 8 October – Matthias McDonnell Bodkin, Nationalist politician, barrister and journalist (died 1933).
- 22 December – Thomas O'Shaughnessy, lawyer and judge (died 1933).
  Full date unknown
  - Thomas Lough, Liberal politician in Britain, Lord Lieutenant of Cavan (died 1922).
  - Samuel Shumack, farmer and author in Australia (died 1940 in Australia).

== See also ==
- 1850 in Scotland
- 1850 in Wales
