= 1912 in Ireland =

- Centuries: 18th; 19th; 20th; 21st
- Decades: 1890s; 1900s; 1910s; 1920s; 1930s
- See also: 1912 in the United Kingdom; Other events of 1912; List of years in Ireland

Events in the year 1912 in Ireland.

== Events ==
=== February ===
- 8 February – The First Lord of the Admiralty Winston Churchill addressed a pro-Home Rule meeting in Belfast despite Ulster Unionist attempts to prevent him speaking. He shared the platform with John Redmond, the leader of the Irish Parliamentary Party.

=== March ===
- 31 March – John Redmond, Eoin MacNeill, Patrick Pearse, Tim Healy and others addressed a monster meeting of 200,000 people in favour of Home Rule at the General Post Office, Dublin.

=== April ===
- 9 April – 250,000 Orangemen converged on Balmoral Showground in Belfast, declaring that under no circumstances would they accept Home Rule.
- 11 April – The prime minister of the United Kingdom H. H. Asquith introduced the Third Home Rule Bill in the House of Commons of the United Kingdom.
- 12 April – A convention of Sinn Féin delegates led by Arthur Griffith opposed the Home Rule Bill.
- 14 April – The RMS Titanic, the largest vessel in the world, built in Belfast and making her last call at Queenstown, collided with an iceberg and sank.
- 22 April – Englishman Denys Corbett Wilson flying a Blériot XI monoplane completed the first aeroplane crossing of the Irish Sea, flying westbound from Goodwick in southwest Wales to Enniscorthy in southeast Ireland. The flight took 100 minutes.
- 26 April – Welsh aviator Vivian Hewitt made a westbound aeroplane crossing of the Irish Sea in 90 minutes from Holyhead in northwest Wales to Phoenix Park in Dublin.
- 30 April – Winston Churchill moved the second reading of the Home Rule Bill at Westminster.

=== May ===
- 9 May – The second reading of the Home Rule Bill was accepted in the British House of Commons. A Unionist amendment rejecting the Bill was defeated.
- 10 May – At the Royal Albert Hall in London, Bonar Law spoke of Conservative opposition to the Home Rule Bill. Elsewhere Edward Carson also voiced his opposition.

=== July ===
- 1 July – A serious outbreak of foot and mouth disease occurred in Counties Dublin, Meath, Kildare and Wicklow.
- July – Prime Minister of the United Kingdom H. H. Asquith travelled to Dublin (the first sitting Prime Minister to do so in over a century; Gladstone had visited Dublin in November 1877 whilst out of office, whilst Arthur Balfour had been Chief Secretary for Ireland) to make a speech, criticising Unionist demands.
- 17 July - "A hatchet (around which a text reading 'This symbol of the extinction of the Liberal Party for evermore' was wrapped) was thrown [by a suffragette] at [Asquith's] moving carriage as it passed over O’Connell Bridge", striking John Redmond on the arm.
- 18 July – Suffragettes attempted an arson attack on the Theatre Royal, Dublin, during Asquith's visit.
- 27 July – the Blenheim Unionist rally: Bonar Law, leader of the British Conservative Party in opposition, made a defiant speech at a massive Unionist rally at Blenheim Palace against Home Rule, implying support for armed resistance to it in Ulster.

=== September ===
- 28 September – 'Ulster Day' – the Ulster Covenant to resist Home Rule was signed by almost 250,000 men throughout Ulster; 229,000 women signed a parallel declaration.

=== October ===
- 23 October – Large numbers of cattle were slaughtered in Mullingar due to the outbreak of foot and mouth disease in the area.

=== Undated ===
- The golden eagle became extinct in Ireland (prior to reintroduction).

== Arts and literature ==
- 11 April – Lennox Robinson's play Patriots was first performed, at the Abbey Theatre in Dublin.
- 20 April – Bram Stoker, author of Dracula and theatrical manager, died in London.
- November – Lord Dunsany's short story collection The Book of Wonder was published.

=== Undated ===
- Peadar Kearney and Patrick Heeney's A Soldier's Song (which later became Amhrán na bhFiann, the Irish national anthem) was first published in Irish Freedom by Bulmer Hobson.
- Eleanor Hull published The Poem-Book of the Gael: translations from Irish Gaelic poetry into English prose and verse and first versified the traditional Irish hymn Be Thou My Vision in English.
- Forrest Reid's coming-of-age novel Following Darkness was published.
- James Stephens' novel The Crock of Gold was published.
- The popular song "When Irish Eyes Are Smiling" was written and published in the United States for the show The Isle O' Dreams.

== Sport ==
=== Association football ===
- International
  10 February – Ireland 1–6 England (in Dublin).
  6 March – Ireland 1–4 Scotland (in Belfast)–
  13 April – Wales 2–3 Ireland (in Cardiff)
  Irish League
  Winners: Glentoran F.C.
  Irish Cup
  Winners: Linfield F.C. (last club remaining after several others withdrew)
- Bohemian F.C. were re-admitted to the Irish Football League after resigning the previous year. Tritonville F.C., another Dublin team, joined the League, but lasted just one season.

=== Gaelic games ===
- All-Ireland Senior Football Championship 1912 Winners: Louth
- All-Ireland Senior Hurling Championship 1912 Winners: Kilkenny

=== Olympics ===
- Ken McArthur, born in Dervock, County Antrim, won the marathon race for South Africa at the 1912 Summer Olympics.

== Births ==
- 8 January – James Brophy, cricketer (died 1994).
- 5 February – Desmond Surfleet, cricketer (died 2006).
- 14 February – Joseph Brennan, Fianna Fáil party TD, cabinet minister and Ceann Comhairle of Dáil Éireann (died 1980).
- 22 March – Wilfrid Brambell, actor (died 1985).
- 12 April – Gerald Goldberg, lawyer, Fianna Fáil party politician and first Jewish Lord Mayor of Cork (died 2003).
- 27 April – Tommy Breen, international association football player (died 1988).
- 29 April – Terence de Vere White, lawyer, novelist, and biographer (died 1994).
- 7 May – Con Lehane, nationalist, member of the IRA Army Council, and Dáil representative (died 1983).
- 9 June – Patrick Mulligan, Bishop of Clogher 1970–1979 (died 1990).
- 12 July – Mick Mackey, Limerick hurler and first recipient of the All-Time All Star Award (hurling) (died 1982).
- 26 July – Niall Sheridan, poet, fiction writer and broadcaster (died 1998).
- 9 August – Alex Stevenson, association football player (died 1985).
- 18 September – Denis Farrelly, Fine Gael party TD and senator (died 1974).
- 24 October – Tommy Potts, fiddle player (died 1988).
- 12 November – Donagh MacDonagh, writer and judge (died 1968).
- 1 December – Micheál Cranitch, Fianna Fáil party politician, Cathaoirleach of Seanad Éireann in 1973 (died 1999).
- 25 December – Mícheál Ó Móráin, Fianna Fáil party TD and Cabinet minister (died 1983).
  Date unknown
  - Brendan Menton Snr, association football administrator and president of the Football Association of Ireland (died 2002).
  - Denis O'Conor Don, hereditary chief of the O'Conor Don sept (died 2000).
  - Jimmy Warnock, boxer (died 1987).

== Deaths ==
- 30 January – John Philip Nolan, soldier, landowner, and politician (born 1838).
- 21 February – Osborne Reynolds, engineer and prominent innovator in the understanding of fluid dynamics (born 1842).
- 20 April – Bram Stoker, writer and author of Dracula (born 1847).
- 24 April – Justin McCarthy, politician, historian, and novelist (born 1830).
- 28 April – Michael Thomas Stenson, politician in Canada (born 1838).
- 19 December – Thomas Brennan, a founder and joint first secretary of the Irish National Land League (born 1853).
  Date unknown
  - Henry Allan, painter (born 1865).

== See also ==
- 1912 in Scotland
- 1912 in Wales
