= James Brophy (cricketer) =

Irish cricketer

Personal information
- Full name: James Noel Brophy
- Born: 8 January 1912; Cork, Ireland
- Died: 23 September 1994 (aged 82); Stamullen, County Meath, Ireland
- Batting: Right-handed
- Role: Wicket-keeper

Domestic team information
- Years: Team
- 1938: Ireland

Career statistics
Competition	First-class
Matches	1
Runs scored	13
Batting average	6.50
100s/50s	–/–
Top score	9
Catches/stumpings	–/–
- Source: Cricinfo, 2 January 2022

James Brophy (8 January 1912 in Cork – 23 September 1994 in County Meath) was an Irish cricketer. A right-handed batsman and wicket-keeper, he played just once for Ireland, a first-class match against Scotland in July 1938.
