= Desmond Surfleet =

Irish cricketer and schoolmaster

Personal information
- Full name: Desmond Ford Surfleet
- Born: 5 February 1912; Drumcondra, Ireland
- Died: 13 May 2006 (aged 94); Los Altos, California, United States
- Batting: Right-handed
- Bowling: Right-arm off break

Domestic team information
- Years: Team
- 1931–1932: Cambridge University
- 1931–1933: Middlesex

Career statistics
Competition	First-class
Matches	14
Runs scored	337
Batting average	16.85
100s/50s	–/1
Top score	86
Balls bowled	30
Wickets	0
Bowling average	–
5 wickets in innings	–
10 wickets in match	–
Best bowling	–
Catches/stumpings	7/–
- Source: Cricinfo, 30 December 2021

Desmond Ford Surfleet (5 February 1912, in Drumcondra, Dublin, Ireland – 13 May 2006, in Los Altos, California) was an Irish cricketer and schoolmaster.

He was educated at University College School (UCS), Hampstead, and Christ's College, Cambridge, where he qualified as a doctor. He created an impression for UCS in schools cricket and also in club cricket for Finchley.

He represented Cambridge University and Middlesex in 14 first-class matches between 1931 and 1933 as a defensive top-order batsman and off-spinner. He scored 86 on his Freshman's debut versus against the New Zealand tourists in 1931. He scored 337 runs at an average of 16.85 and took seven catches. After entering teaching, he took part in no further county cricket.

He was the second oldest surviving Middlesex cricketer at the time of his death in May 2006.
