= 1775 in Ireland =

- Centuries: 16th; 17th; 18th; 19th; 20th
- Decades: 1750s; 1760s; 1770s; 1780s; 1790s
- See also: Other events of 1775; List of years in Ireland

Events from the year 1775 in Ireland.

== Incumbent ==
- Monarch: George III

== Events ==
- Henry Flood accepts a seat on the Privy Council of Ireland and becomes vice-treasurer.
- Henry Grattan enters the Parliament of Ireland and becomes leader of the "patriot party".
- Approximate date – Dark Hedges planted.
- November – the 90ft tall round tower adjoining the Church of St Michael le Pole in Dublin is damaged in "the great storm of 1775", and subsequently demolished for safety in 1778.

== Arts and literature ==
- 17 January – Richard Brinsley Sheridan's first play, the comedy of manners The Rivals, is premiered at the Covent Garden Theatre, London.
- Robert Jephson's tragedy Braganza is first performed at the Theatre Royal, Drury Lane, London.

== Births ==
- 3 March – Henry Prittie, 2nd Baron Dunalley, politician (died 1854).
- 25 April – William Warren Baldwin, doctor, businessman, lawyer, judge, architect and political figure in Upper Canada (died 1844).
- 6 August – Daniel O'Connell, politician, campaigner for Catholic emancipation and Repeal of the Union (died 1847).
- 30 September – Robert Adrain, scientist and mathematician in America (died 1843).
  Full date unknown
  - Bernard McMahon, horticulturalist in the United States (died 1816).
  - William Thompson, political and philosophical writer and social reformer (died 1833).

== Deaths ==
- 27 April – John Rutty, Quaker physician and naturalist (born c. 1697 in England).
- 31 December – Richard Montgomery, soldier, major general in the Continental Army during the Revolutionary War (born 1738).
- Probable date – Elizabeth Aldworth, freemason (born 1693/5).
