= 1845 in the United Kingdom =

Events from the year 1845 in the United Kingdom.

== Incumbents ==
- Monarch – Victoria
- Prime Minister – Robert Peel (Conservative)
- Foreign Secretary – George Hamilton-Gordon, 4th Earl of Aberdeen
- Home Secretary – Sir James Graham

== Events ==
- 3 January – First known arrest of a fugitive achieved through use of the new electric telegraph when murderer John Tawell is arrested after being followed by a detective alerted prior to Tawell's arrival at London Paddington station.
- February – Andover workhouse scandal begins.
- 7 February – In the British Museum, a drunken visitor smashes the Portland Vase which takes months to repair.
- 11 March – Flagstaff War: Chiefs Kawiti and Hōne Heke lead 700 Māori people in the burning of the British colonial settlement of Kororāreka, later known as Russell, New Zealand.
- 15 March – First University Boat Race to use the present Putney to Mortlake course (albeit in the reverse direction to that used today).
- 17 March – Stephen Perry patents the rubber band.
- 26 March – Sisterhood of the Holy Cross ('Park Village Community') established as the first Anglican sisterhood, to minister to the poor of St Pancras, London.
- 1 May – First cricket match to be played at the Kennington Oval.
- 2 May – The Yarmouth suspension bridge at Great Yarmouth, Norfolk, collapses: 79 killed.
- 19 May – HMS Erebus and HMS Terror with 134 men, comprising Sir John Franklin's expedition to find the Northwest Passage, sail from Greenhithe on the Thames. They will last be seen in the summer entering Baffin Bay.
- 20 May – The last fatal duel between Englishmen on English soil takes place near Gosport. James Alexander Seton is shot and dies twelve days later from his wound. His opponent, Royal Marine Lieutenant Charles Lawes Pym, is tried for murder a year later, but acquitted.
- 31 May – Launch of the first English lake steamer Lady of the Lake for Windermere.
- 21 July – An unprecedented number of railway acts receive Royal Assent from Queen Victoria as the railway mania approaches its peak, Parliament having sanctioned 2,816 mi (4,532 km) of new construction.
- 26 July–10 August – Isambard Kingdom Brunel's iron steamship SS Great Britain makes the Transatlantic crossing from Liverpool to New York, the first screw propelled vessel to make the passage.
- 31 July – Jews are permitted to hold certain municipal offices.
- 9 August – The Aberdeen Act instructing the Royal Navy to counter the Brazilian slave trade, is signed.
- 9 September – A potato blight breaks out in Ireland, beginning the Great Famine.
- 18 September – Anglo-French blockade of the Río de la Plata formally declared.
- September – First students admitted to the Royal Agricultural College, Cirencester, the first agricultural college in the English-speaking world.
- 9 October – The eminent and controversial Anglican, John Henry Newman, is received into the Roman Catholic Church.
- 16 October – The Bank of England raises the bank rate to 3%.
- 31 October–1 November – An emergency meeting of the Cabinet (summoned on 15 October by Sir Robert Peel, the Prime Minister) votes against Peel on the distribution of famine relief in Ireland, considering it would call the Corn Laws into question.
- 9–10 November – Peel orders the secret purchase of £100,000 worth of maize and meal from the United States for distribution in Ireland.
- 20 November – Anglo-French blockade of the Río de la Plata: Battle of Vuelta de Obligado: the Anglo-French fleet narrowly defeats the Argentine Confederation on the waters of the Paraná River but the victors suffer serious damage to their ships and Argentina attracts political support in South America.
- 5 December – Unable to persuade his Cabinet to repeal the Corn Laws in the face of the Great Famine in Ireland, Peel tenders his resignation as Prime Minister to the Queen but is reinstated days later when Lord John Russell is unable to form a government.
- 22–23 December – First Anglo-Sikh War: British forces defeat Sikhs at Battle of Ferozeshah in Punjab.
- 30 December – Queen's Colleges of Belfast, Cork and Galway are incorporated in Ireland.

=== Undated ===
- Glass tax abolished.
- First national general domestic poultry show in the U.K. held at London Zoo.
- Clarendon slab-serif typeface created by Robert Besley for the Fann Street Foundry.

== Publications ==
- Eliza Acton's cookbook Modern Cookery for Private Families.
- Thomas De Quincey's essays Suspiria de Profundis (in Blackwood's Magazine).
- Charles Dickens' novella The Cricket on the Hearth (20 December).
- Benjamin Disraeli's novel Sybil, or The Two Nations.
- Friedrich Engels' treatise The Condition of the Working Class in England (published in Leipzig as Die Lage der arbeitenden Klasse in England).
- William Sewell's religious novel Hawkstone: a tale of and for England.
- Varney the Vampire, a 'penny dreadful' probably written by James Malcolm Rymer and Thomas Peckett Prest (begins serialisation).

== Births ==
- 14 January – Henry Petty-Fitzmaurice, 5th Marquess of Lansdowne, statesman and colonial administrator (died 1927 in Ireland)
- 14 February – Quintin Hogg, philanthropist (died 1903)
- 20 February – Rosalind Howard, Countess of Carlisle, née Stanley, "The Radical Countess", campaigner (died 1921)
- 4 May – William Kingdon Clifford, geometer and philosopher (died 1879)
- 14 May – L. S. Bevington, anarchist poet and essayist (died 1895)
- 4 July – Thomas John Barnardo, Irish-born philanthropist (died 1905)
- 9 July – Gilbert Elliot-Murray-Kynynmound, 4th Earl of Minto, politician (died 1914)
- 1 September – Paul Methuen, 3rd Baron Methuen, field marshal (died 1932)

== Deaths ==
- 11 January – Etheldred Benett, geologist (born 1776)
- 28 January – Mary Ann Browne, poet and writer of musical scores (born 1812)
- 19 February – Sir Fowell Buxton, brewer, politician, abolitionist and social reformer (born 1786)
- 22 February
  - William Wellesley-Pole, 3rd Earl of Mornington, politician (born 1763)
  - Sydney Smith, writer, wit and clergyman (born 1771)
- 13 March – John Frederic Daniell, physical scientist (born 1790)
- 3 May – Thomas Hood, poet and humorist (born 1799)
- 6 June – John Marshall, textile manufacturer (born 1765)
- 17 June – Richard Harris Barham (Thomas Ingoldsby), comic poet and clergyman (born 1788)
- 17 July – Charles Grey, 2nd Earl Grey, Prime Minister of the United Kingdom (born 1764)
- 7 October – John Jackson, boxer (born 1769)
- 12 October – Elizabeth Fry, humanitarian (born 1780)
- 26 October – Carolina Oliphant, Lady Nairne, Scottish songwriter and collector (born 1766)
- 17 November – Sir Salusbury Pryce Humphreys, admiral (born 1778)
