= 1822 in Ireland =

- Centuries: 17th; 18th; 19th; 20th; 21st
- Decades: 1800s; 1810s; 1820s; 1830s; 1840s
- See also: 1822 in the United Kingdom; Other events of 1822; List of years in Ireland

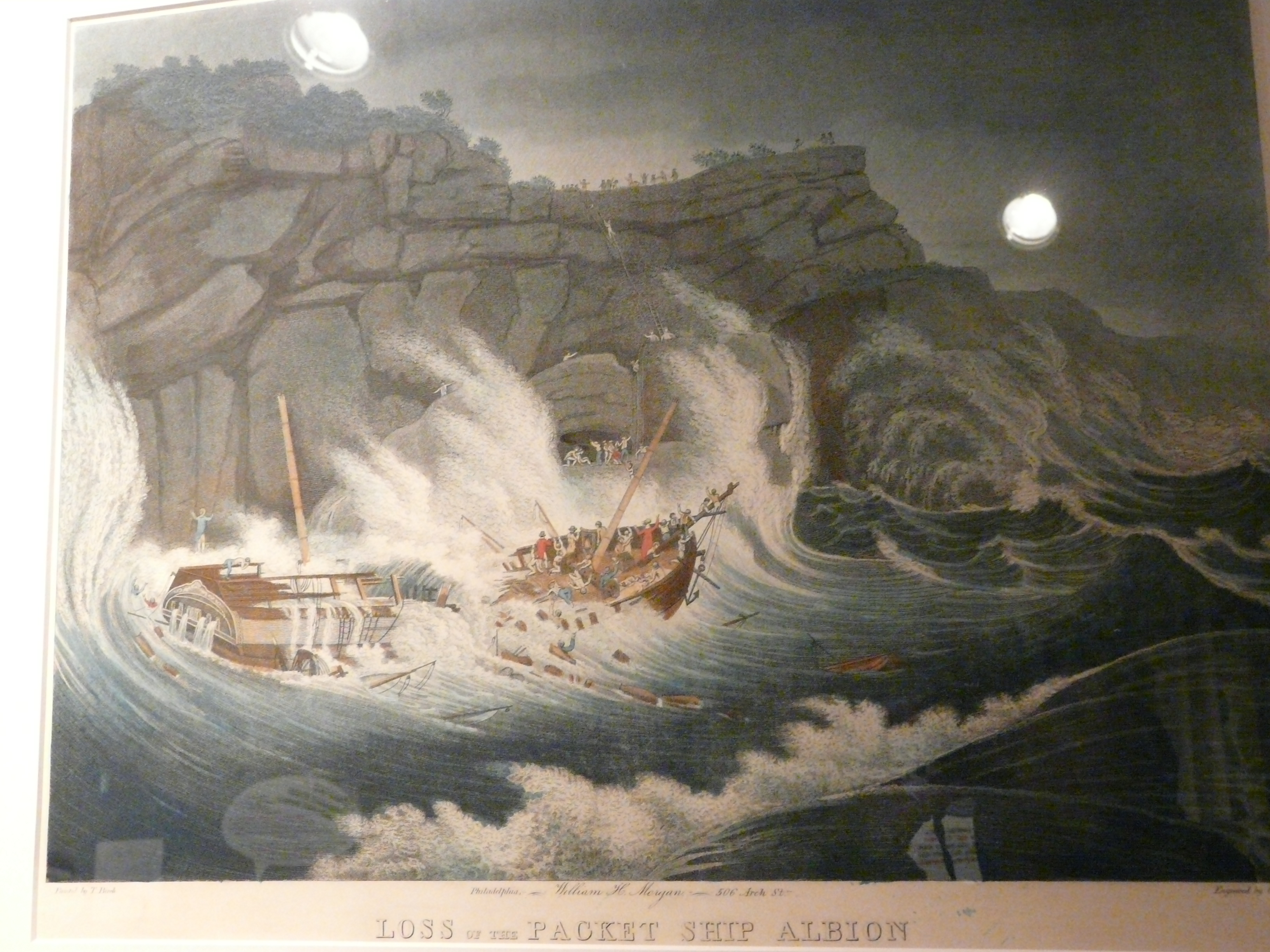
The packet ship Albion runs aground, on the coast of Ireland off Garretstown near Old Point of Kinsale on April 22 1822

Events from the year 1822 in Ireland.

== Events ==
- 22 April – The Albion, a Black Ball Line trans-Atlantic packet, is driven ashore at Old Head of Kinsale with the loss of 46 of the 54 aboard.
- 7 June – The Constitution; or, Cork Morning Post begins publication.
- 19 July – Percy Jocelyn, Anglican Bishop of Clogher, is caught in a compromising position with a young Grenadier Guardsman at a public house in London. He breaks bail and flees England. In October, an Irish ecclesiastical court deprives him of office.
- 21 September – HMS Confiance, a Royal Navy Cruizer-class brig-sloop of 1813, is wrecked between Mizen Head and Three Castles Head near Crookhaven with the loss of all 100 aboard.
- Public gas lighting in Belfast.
- Mary Leadbeater's Cottage Biography, being a Collection of Lives of the Irish Peasantry is published.

== Births ==
- 16 February – James Thomson, engineer and physicist (died 1892).
- 21 February – Richard Bourke, 6th Earl of Mayo, statesman, three times Chief Secretary for Ireland, Viceroy of India (assassinated 1872 in the Andaman Islands).
- 31 August – Timothy Anglin, politician in Canada and Speaker of the House of Commons of Canada (died 1896).
- September – Denis Dynon, soldier, recipient of the Victoria Cross for gallantry in 1857 at Chota Behar, India (died 1863).
- 2 October – James Pearson, soldier, recipient of the Victoria Cross for gallantry in 1858 at Jhansi, India (died 1900).
- 11 October – Alexander John Arbuthnot, British official in India and writer (died 1907).
- November – John Divane, soldier, recipient of the Victoria Cross for gallantry in 1857 at Delhi, India (died 1888).
- 4 December – Frances Power Cobbe, social reformer, feminist theorist, pioneer animal rights activist and writer (died 1904).
- 11 December – John Nicholson, military hero in India (died 1857).
  Full date unknown
  - James Byrne, soldier, recipient of the Victoria Cross for gallantry in 1858 at Jhansi, India (died 1872).
  - Maxwell Henry Close, geologist (died 1903).
  - Joseph Philip Ronayne, civil engineer (died 1876).

== Deaths ==
- 15 February – Pierce Butler, soldier, planter, statesman, one of United States' Founding Fathers, represented South Carolina in the Continental Congress and the U.S. Senate (born 1744).
- 25 March – Robert Blake, dentist, first State Dentist of Dublin (born 1772).
- 12 August – Robert Stewart, Viscount Castlereagh, politician, represented the United Kingdom at the Congress of Vienna (born 1769).
- John Bowden, ecclesiastical architect.

== See also ==
- 1822 in Scotland
- 1822 in Wales
