= 1854 in Ireland =

- Centuries: 17th; 18th; 19th; 20th; 21st
- Decades: 1830s; 1840s; 1850s; 1860s; 1870s
- See also: 1854 in the United Kingdom; Other events of 1854; List of years in Ireland

== Events ==
- 9 January – Fastnet Rock lighthouse first lit.
- 21 January – the iron clipper RMS Tayleur runs aground on Lambay Island on her maiden voyage out of Liverpool with the loss of at least 300 of around 650 on board.
- 18 May – Catholic University of Ireland formally established in Dublin with John Henry Newman as first rector; lectures commence on 3 November.
- 21 June – during the First Battle of Bomarsund, Scarva-born Mate Charles Davis Lucas throws a live shell overboard, the earliest action to result in award of the Victoria Cross (in 1857).
- 20 September – during the Battle of the Alma, Elphin-born Sergeant Luke O'Connor saves the colours, the earliest action to result in award of the Victoria Cross to a soldier.

=== Full date unknown ===
- The Campanile in Trinity College Dublin was completed.
- Quarrel between Tenant League and Archbishop Cullen; League appeals to Rome.

== The arts and literature ==
- 10 August - National Gallery of Ireland established.
- Daniel Maclise completes his painting The Marriage of Strongbow and Aoife.

== Births ==
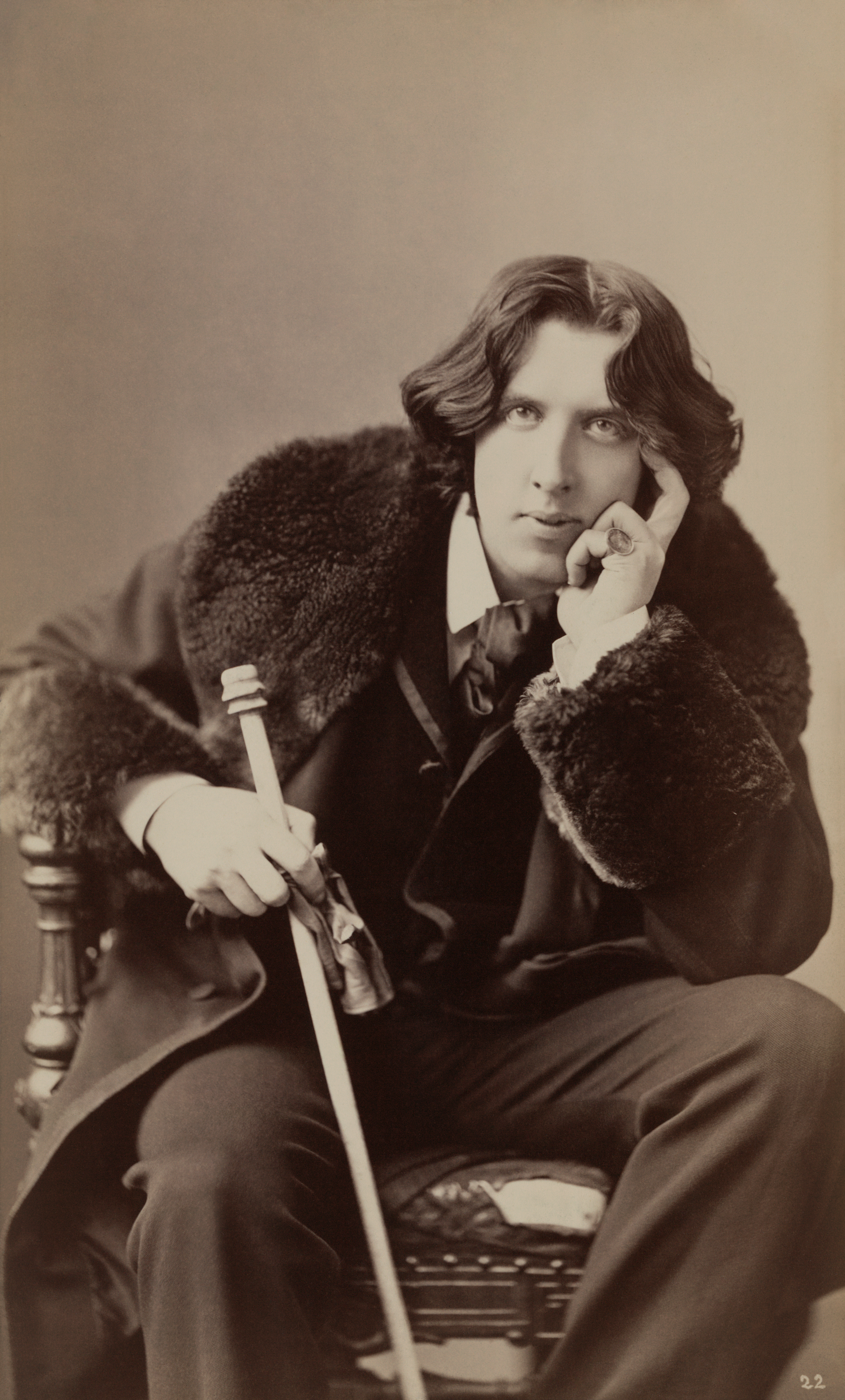
Oscar Wilde

- 1 January (possible) – Thomas Waddell, Irish-Australian politician, 15th Premier of New South Wales (died 1940 in Australia)
- 9 February – Edward Carson, Baron Carson, Irish Unionist leader, barrister and judge (died 1935)
- 25 March – John Le Hay, born John Healy, comic baritone (died 1926 resulting from traffic accident in London)
- 10 June – Sarah Grand, born Frances Elizabeth Bellenden Clarke, feminist author (died 1943 in England)
- 1 May – Percy French, civil engineer, songwriter, entertainer and artist (died 1920)
- 16 October – Oscar Wilde, playwright, novelist, poet (died 1900 in France)
- 24 October – Horace Plunkett, politician, agricultural reformer and writer (died 1932)
- Full date unknown – Bowman Malcolm, railway engineer (born in England; died 1933)

== Deaths ==
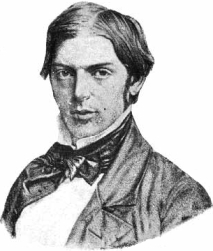
Thomas Devin Reilly

- 22 January – Patrick O'Donoghue, journalist and Young Irelander (in the United States)
- 5 March – Thomas Devin Reilly, revolutionary, Young Irelander and journalist (born 1823)
- 6 March – Charles Stewart, 3rd Marquess of Londonderry, soldier, politician and nobleman (born 1778)
- 8 July – George Halpin, civil engineer (born c.1779)
- 8 August – Thomas Crofton Croker, antiquary (born 1798)
- 19 October – Henry Prittie, 2nd Baron Dunalley, politician (born 1775)
- 31 December – Nathaniel Clements, 2nd Earl of Leitrim, nobleman and Whig MP (born 1768)

== See also ==
- 1854 in Scotland
- 1854 in Wales
