= 1841 in Ireland =

- Centuries: 17th; 18th; 19th; 20th; 21st
- Decades: 1820s; 1830s; 1840s; 1850s; 1860s
- See also: 1841 in the United Kingdom; Other events of 1841; List of years in Ireland

Events from the year 1841 in Ireland

== Events ==
- 6 June – 1841 census of Ireland: the first thorough census is completed and the population of Ireland is calculated to be just under 8.2 million.
- 1 November – Daniel O'Connell is elected as the first Roman Catholic Lord Mayor of Dublin in centuries.
- 3 November – foundation stone for Saint Malachy's Church, Belfast is laid (completed in 1844).
- Ennis Friary refounded by Franciscans.
- The Cork Examiner newspaper is founded by John Francis Maguire in support of the Catholic emancipation and tenant rights work of Daniel O'Connell.
- Ulster Canal completed.
- Anthony Trollope moves to Ireland as an official of the General Post Office, initially settling in Banagher.

== Arts and literature ==
- Charles Lever's novel Charles O'Malley, the Irish Dragoon is published in Dublin.

== Births ==
- 12 February – Windham Wyndham-Quin, 4th Earl of Dunraven and Mount-Earl, peer (died 1926).
- 30 April – Charles Cooper Penrose-Fitzgerald, admiral in the Royal Navy (died 1921).
- 31 August – Patrick Egan, treasurer of the Irish Land League, fled to the United States, United States Minister to Chile (died 1919).
- 10 September – Max Arthur Macauliffe, British administrator, scholar and author (died 1913).
- 31 October – Abraham Dowdney, United States Representative from New York and officer in the Union army in the American Civil War (died 1886).
- 5 December – Marcus Daly, businessman in America (died 1900).
- 22 December – Thomas McCarthy Fennell, Fenian political prisoner transported to Western Australia (died 1914).
  Full date unknown
  - Patrick Buckley, soldier, lawyer, statesman, and judge in New Zealand (died 1896).
  - Rosa Mulholland, novelist, short-story writer and poet (died 1921).
  - Charles Anderson Read, journalist, novelist and anthologist (died 1878).

== Deaths ==
- 7 January – James Arthur O'Connor, painter (born 1792).
- 17 March – Tyrone Power, actor, comedian, author and theatrical manager (born 1797).
- 18 April – Somerset Lowry-Corry, 2nd Earl Belmore, politician and statesman (born 1774).
- 21 July – Price Blackwood, 4th Baron Dufferin and Claneboye, Royal Navy captain (born 1794).
- 24 August – Thomas Hopkirk, botanist (born 1785 in Scotland).
- 11 November – Catherine McAuley, nun (born 1778).

== See also ==
- 1841 in Scotland
- 1841 in Wales
