= 1849 in Ireland =

- Centuries: 17th; 18th; 19th; 20th; 21st
- Decades: 1820s; 1830s; 1840s; 1850s; 1860s
- See also: 1849 in the United Kingdom; Other events of 1849; List of years in Ireland

Events from the year 1849 in Ireland.

== Events ==
- 30–31 March – Doolough Tragedy: At least 16 died when hundreds of the destitute and starving were forced to make a fatiguing journey on foot to receive outdoor relief in County Mayo.
- 21 April – Great Famine: 96 inmates of the overcrowded Ballinrobe Union Workhouse died over the course of the preceding week from illness and other famine-related conditions, a record high. This year's potato crop again failed and there were renewed outbreaks of cholera.
- 29 April – Brig Hannah carrying emigrants from Newry fleeing the Great Famine to Canada hit ice and sank in the Gulf of St. Lawrence and her senior officers abandoned the passengers to their fate. Around one-third of those on board, 49, died.
- 12 July – Dolly's Brae conflict: Up to 1,400 armed Orangemen marched from Rathfriland to Tollymore Park near Castlewellan, County Down. When 1,000 armed Ribbonmen gathered, shots were fired, Catholic homes were burnt and about eighty Catholics killed.
- 16 July – The Donaghadee to Portpatrick packet service was withdrawn.
- 2–12 August – Queen Victoria undertook her first state visit to Ireland, visiting Cork, Dublin and Belfast, landing on 3 August at Cobh (then spelt "Cove"), which was renamed Queenstown in her honour, and departing from Kingstown in Dublin. She officially opened Queen's Bridge in Belfast.
- 3 August – A statue of Queen Victoria was erected in her honour on the apex of the east gable of the Aula Maxima building at Queen's College, Cork
- 18 October – The Great Southern and Western Railway opened to Cork.
- 20 October – The first issue of the Dundalk Democrat and People's Journal was published
- 7 November – Queen's College, Cork opened with its first lectures. It had been established as one of three constituent colleges of the Queen's University in Ireland in 1845, to provide "non-denominational education at university level" (the other two colleges were situated in Belfast and Galway).

=== Full date unknown ===
- Construction began on the 18-arch Craigmore Viaduct near Newry, on the Dublin-Belfast railway line (opened in 1852).
- George Boole was appointed as first professor of mathematics at Queen's College, Cork.
- William Thompson began publication (in London) of The Natural History of Ireland, with the first volume, on birds.

== Births ==
- 31 January – R. J. McMordie, solicitor, politician and Lord Mayor of Belfast (died 1914).
- 12 February – John Edward Robinson, Missionary Bishop of the Methodist Episcopal Church (died 1922).
- 18 May – John Clark, boxer (died 1922).
- 4 July – John Stanislaus Joyce, businessman, civil servant, and father of the writer James Joyce (died 1931).
- 9 July – Robert McCall, lawyer (died 1934).
- 1 August – William Larminie, poet and folklorist (died 1900).
- 16 August – James Buchanan, 1st Baron Woolavington, businessman and philanthropist (died 1935).
- 24 October – Nugent Everard, soldier, Seanad member (died 1929).
- 19 November – James Mason, chess player and writer (died 1905).
- 12 December – Peter F. Collier, publisher (died 1909)
- Charles James O'Donnell, colonial administrator and MP (died 1934).

== Deaths ==
- 21 January – Anthony Manahan, businessman and politician in Upper Canada (born 1794).
- 26 January – Thomas Arbuthnot, British military officer (born 1776).
- 7 March – Maurice FitzGerald, 18th Knight of Kerry, Whig politician (born 1774).
- 27 March – Archibald Acheson, 2nd Earl of Gosford, MP, Lieutenant-Governor of Lower Canada and Governor General of British North America (born 1776).
- 22 May – Maria Edgeworth, novelist (born 1767).
- 28 May – Joseph Blake, 3rd Baron Wallscourt, socialist (born 1797).
- 20 June – James Clarence Mangan, poet (born 1803) (cholera).
- September – Daniel Robertson, architect and garden designer (born c. 1770 in British North America).
- 27 December – James Fintan Lalor, revolutionary, journalist and writer (born 1807).
