= 1908 in Ireland =

- Centuries: 18th; 19th; 20th; 21st
- Decades: 1880s; 1890s; 1900s; 1910s; 1920s
- See also: 1908 in the United Kingdom; Other events of 1908; List of years in Ireland

Events in the year 1908 in Ireland.

== Events ==
- February – Republican leader Tom Clarke opened a tobacconist shop in Dublin under the name of T. S. Ó'Cléirigh which became a centre for Irish Republican Brotherhood activity.
- 15 February – A statue of Queen Victoria was unveiled at Leinster House in Dublin.
- 21 February - The Georgian Society was founded and held its inaugural meeting at Academy House on Dawson Street.
- 19 April – The Guildhall in Derry was largely destroyed by fire.
- 19 May – Work began on a monument to Charles Stewart Parnell in Upper Sackville Street, Dublin.
- 31 July – The Irish Universities Act 1908 received royal assent in the Parliament of the UK. This led to the establishment of the National University of Ireland and Queen's University of Belfast. Queen's College, Cork was reconstituted as University College Cork.
- 8 September – Patrick Pearse opened St. Enda's School (Scoil Éanna) to offer a bilingual secondary education for boys at Cullenswood House in Ranelagh. It later moved to the Hermitage, Rathfarnham.
- 11 November – The Irish Women's Franchise League was formed, with Hanna Sheehy-Skeffington as secretary.
- 29 December – The Irish Transport Workers' Union was formed, with James Larkin as general secretary.

== Arts and literature ==
- January – Hugh Lane founded the Dublin City Gallery in Harcourt Street, the world's first to display only modern art.
- 1 December – Cuala Press produced its first publication, Poetry and Ireland: essays by W. B. Yeats and Lionel Johnson.
- Terence MacSwiney, T. C. Murray, Con O'Leary and Daniel Corkery founded the Cork Dramatic Society.
- John Millington Synge's only comedic play, The Tinker's Wedding, was published.
- Filson Young's novel When the Tides Turn was published.

== Sport ==
- 1908 Summer Olympics (London): Ireland competed as a separate country in field hockey and polo, and won silver medals in both.

=== Association football ===
- International
  - 15 February – Ireland 1–3 England (in Belfast)
  - 14 March – Ireland 0–5 Scotland (in Dublin)
  - 11 April – Wales 0–1 Ireland (in Aberdare)
  Irish League
  Winners: Linfield F.C.
  Irish Cup
  Winners: Bohemian F.C. 1–1 draw; replay result 3–1 Shelbourne F.C.

=== Golf ===
- The golf course at Royal County Down Golf Club was modified by Harry Vardon, and Edward VII bestowed royal patronage on the club.

== Births ==
- 20 February – Florence Wycherley, independent TD (died 1969).
- 23 February – Jim Ware, Waterford hurler (died 1983).
- 10 March – Patrick Shanahan, Fianna Fáil party TD (died 2000).
- 27 April – Patrick Shea, Permanent Secretary in the Northern Ireland Civil Service (died 1986 in Northern Ireland).
- 5 May – Mary Elmes, humanitarian (died 2002 in France).
- 10 June – Gerard Sweetman, Fine Gael party TD and Cabinet minister (died 1970).
- 20 July – Mad Dog Coll, born Uinseann (Vincent) Ó Colla, mob hitman in New York (killed in 1932 in the United States).
- 24 July – Roger McHugh, professor, author, and playwright (died 1987).
- 18 August – Sam English, association football player (died 1967 in Scotland).
- 26 September – Hugh Delargy, British Labour Party Member of Parliament (MP) (died 1976 in Northern Ireland).
- 6 December – Con Cremin, diplomat (died 1987).
  Full date unknown
  - Frances Kelly, painter (died 2002).
  - Niall Ó Dónaill, Irish language lexicographer and writer (died 1995).
  - Mervyn Wall, novelist and dramatist (died 1997).

== Deaths ==
- 17 January – Eyre Massey Shaw, Superintendent of the London Metropolitan Fire Brigade (born 1830; died in England).
- 3 February – Thomas Mellon, entrepreneur, lawyer, and judge, founder of Mellon Bank (born 1813; died in the United States).
- 23 March – Frederick Falkiner, lawyer, judge and author (born 1831).
- 10 June – John F. Finerty, U.S. Representative from Illinois (born 1846; died in the United States).
- 6 July – Thomas William Moffett, scholar, educationalist, and President of Queen's College Galway (born 1820).
- 5 August – Caesar Litton Falkiner, Irish Unionist Party politician, barrister, writer, and historian (born 1863).
- 30 August – Lawrence Parsons, 4th Earl of Rosse, 18th Chancellor of the University of Dublin (born 1840).
- 4 November – John Pinkerton, Irish Parliamentary Party MP (born 1845).
- 15 December – Hugh Annesley, 5th Earl Annesley, British military officer and MP (born 1831).
- 19 December – Thomas Cleeve, founder of Condensed Milk Company of Ireland, High Sheriff of Limerick (born 1844).

== See also ==
- 1908 in Scotland
- 1908 in Wales
