= List of castles in Ireland =

This List of Castles in Ireland, be they in Northern Ireland (United Kingdom) or in the Republic of Ireland, is organised by county within their respective jurisdiction.

== Republic of Ireland ==
=== County Carlow ===
| Name | Image | Location | Type | Date | Notes |
|---|---|---|---|---|---|
| Ballyloughan Castle | | Bagenalstown 52°40′22.5″N 6°53′53.1″W | Castle | 13th century | A ruined castle located near Bagenalstown featuring one of the finest gatehouses in Ireland. The castle's architecture would suggest that the castle was built by a Norman lord c. 1300 and was likely abandoned in the 14th century. Near the end of the 16th century, the castle was occupied by the Kavanghs and then passed to the Bagenals, and then finally to the Bruens in the 19th century. |
| Ballymoon Castle | | Muine Bheag 52°42′0″N 6°54′25.2″W | Castle | 13th century | A Norman castle, assumed by some to be unfinished, built by the Carew family, likely Roger Bigod, sometime between 1290 and 1310, possibly to defend the Barrow river valley from Irish raiders in a region over which the Normans had little control. In the past, the castle has been erroneously associated with the Knights Templar. |
| Carlow Castle | | Carlow 52°50′11″N 6°56′9″W | Castle | 1209 | A once mighty fortress erected by William Marshall upon the site of a motte-and-bailey built by Hugh de Lacy in 1180. The castle has seen combat in various hostilities: the Silken Thomas Rebellion, an attack by Rory Oge O'Moore in 1577, the Irish Rebellion of 1641, the Irish Confederate Wars, and the Conquest of Ireland by Oliver Cromwell. In 1813, the castle was leased to a Dr. Phillip Parry Price Middleton, who attempted to renovate it into a mental asylum in 1814. The castle was demolished after a partial collapse caused by an explosion and abandoned until 1996 when the castle was given into the care of the Office of Public Works. |
| Huntington Castle | | Clonegal 52°41′23.28″N 6°38′54.96″W | Country house | 1625 | A castle constructed by the Esmonde family in 1625, after Queen Elizabeth I's forces captured the area and gave it to the Nettervilles, who then gave it to the Esmondes. A branch of the family, the Robertsons, still maintain ownership of the castle and it still serves as their ancestral home. Despite this, the castle is open to the public. In addition to a shrine to the Egyptian goddess Isis, the castle is noted as being haunted. |
| Leighlinbridge Castle, or Black Castle of Leighlinbridge | | Leighlinbridge 52°44′8.52″N 6°52′41.16″W | Bawn | 1180; 1181; 1547 | A castle built by Hugh de Lacy in 1180 to defend the river crossing, rebuilt by John de Clahull in 1181, and once again rebuilt in 1547 by Edward Bellingham after its destruction in the 14th century by the Cavanaghs. The castle was sacked again by Cromwellian forces under Colonel Hewson in 1650 during the Irish Confederate Wars. |
| Tinnahinch Castle | | 52°31′48″N 6°57′0″W | Country house | c. 1620 | Tinnahinch Castle was built in the early 17th century by James Butler to control a bridge that once stood on this spot, but was confiscated from him for his involvement in the Rebellion of 1641. The castle burned down in 1700 and remains a ruin. |

=== County Cavan ===
| Name | Image | Location | Type | Date | Notes |
|---|---|---|---|---|---|
| Bailieborough Castle | | Bailieborough | Country house | 1613 | Also known as "Castle House" or "Lisgar House," Bailieborough Castle, was by 1629 an enclosed demesne that was attacked by Irish rebel forces under Colonel Hugh O'Reilly in 1641. Around 1895 in Ireland, the estate was sold under the Ashbourne Act to a Sir Stanley Herbert Cochrane Bt., only to be destroyed by fire in 1918. Though the house was largely rebuilt two years later, it was ultimately sold for demolition in 1923. |
| Ballyconnell Castle | | Ballyconnell | Bawn | 1620 | An early 17th-century Plantation-era castle built by a Capt. Culme and Walter Talbot that burned down in 1764. The castle was rebuilt as Ballyconnell House by a "G. Montgomery." |
| Cabra Castle | | Cabra | Mansion | 18-19th centuries | "Cabra Castle" refers to two structures. The first structure, thought to have been an O'Reily castle, was located west of Kingscourt, was destroyed and the land it stood on confiscated by Cromwell and given to Colonel Thomas Cooch. When Cooch died in 1699, he willed the property to the Pratts, a local Ascendancy family. However, the land the current castle stands on was at that time owned by the Fosters, another Ascendancy family, and it contained a small tower destroyed in the time of Cromwell house dubbed "Cormey Castle." This house was rebuilt in 1808, but its construction exhausted the funds of the Fosters so the property was sold to the Pratts. Today, the castle and estate functions as a hotel. |
| Castle Saunderson | | Belturbet | Castle | 1840 | In the 1840s, the Saunderson family built a new mansion upon the land they had owned since the early 17th century and used it as their seat until 1977 when it was sold to a London-based business man. His plans to renovate the castle didn't come to fruition, and so the castle was sold again in 1990. Seven years later, in 1997, the castle and estate were purchased by Scouting Ireland and is now open to the public for most of the year. |
| Cloughoughter Castle | | Belturbet | Castle ruin | 1233 | An ancient castle, possibly built on a crannóg, built by the O'Rourkes, the Anglo-Normans and finished by the O'Reilly clan in 1233. After their 300-year long possession of the castle, during which they imprisoned Philip O'Reilly here in the 1360s, the castle was given to Captain Hugh Clume, and was then demolished by Cromwellian forces in 1653. |

=== County Clare ===
| Name | Image | Location | Type | Date | Notes |
|---|---|---|---|---|---|
| Ballyallaban ringfort | | Ballyvaughan | Circular rampart, ringfort | | An ancient earthen Caher, or ringfort, in good repair located in the Burren next to the R480 near Ballyvaughan that is today an Irish National Monument. |
| Ballynagowan Castle (Smithstown Castle) | | Kilshanny 52°59′27″N 9°16′11.9″W | Tower House | 15th Century | Ballynagowan (Smithstown) takes its name from 'bael-atha-an-ghobhan', meaning the 'mouth of the smiths ford'. It was first mentioned in 1551 when the last King of Munster, Murrough O'Brien, 1st Earl of Thomond (also known as the Tanist) willed the Castle of Ballynagowan to his son Teige before his death. The Irish rebel "red" Hugh O'Donnell, Oliver Cromwell, Conor O'Brien and his wife Máire Rua O'Brien (the "Red Mary"), the High Sheriff of County Clare and Viscount Powerscourt amongst others played a part in the Castle's turbulent history. The Castle became a ruin after its last inhabitants left in the mid-19th century, only to be fully restored again in the 1990s, whereby it was transformed into a self-catering home. www.smithstowncastle.com. |
| Ballinalacken Castle | | Lisdoonvarna | Tower house | 15-16th Centuries | A two-stage castle built on a limestone outcrop that looms over the road from Lisdoonvarna to Fanore. The tower stands on the grounds of an 1840s hotel that was built to serve as a residence for the powerful O'Brien family. |
| Ballyhannon Castle | | Quin | Tower house | c. 1490 | A tower house constructed by Hugh and possibly Síoda MacNamara around 1490. The MacNamaras lost the castle to the O'Briens during the Plantation of Ulster and were further despoiled of the castle during the Rebellion of 1641. The castle survived Cromwell's conquest of Ireland (possibly due to its Protestant ownership at that time) and today operates as hotel. |
| Ballymarkahan Castle | | Quin | Peel tower | c. 1430 | Built by the MacNamara family in the 15th century. Today, the massive tower house is a ruin missing its southeast corner. |
| Ballyportry Castle | | Corofin | Tower house | 15th century | A tower house built upon the ancient site of the seat of the Brian Boru and other O'Briens. Today's tower house was built in the 1490s, and the O'Briens resided there for about a century before their cataclysmic defeat at Kinsale. The castle was restored by American architect Bob Brown in the 1960s. |
| Boston Castle | | Boston | Tower house | | A ruined tower house and the site of the deaths of Mahon O'Brien and the other defenders of the tower in 1586. After three months the besieger, Sir Richard Bingham, Governor of Connacht, accepted the surrender of the defenders, he had them killed and the tower partially destroyed. |
| Bunratty Castle | | Bunratty | Castle | 1425 | Today a tourist attraction, this 15th century castle has a long and checkered history. Built on the site of an ancient Viking settlement and an earlier 13th century castle built in 1270 by Thomas de Clare, this castle, built in 1425 by MacNamara clan, was seized by the O'Briens in a battle in 1475, whose lord was then granted the title "Earl of Thomund" by King Henry VIII. The castle, under the defense of William Penn, was again seized in the Irish Confederate Wars. In 1712, the castle left the holding of the O'Briens when the Eighth (and last) Earl of Thomund sold it to the Studderts, who left it to fall into ruin when they moved to a nearby residence called "Bunratty House." In 1956, Viscount Lord Gort, with the help of the Irish Office of Public Works, purchased, restored and opened the castle to the public. Today, it remains in the care of the Shannon Heritage. |
| Caherconnell Stone Fort | | The Burren | Ringfort | 10th century | This ringfort, located 1 kilometre (0.62 mi) from Poulnabrone dolmen, is one of the Burren's most popular tourist attractions. Excavations have shown that this ancient ringfort may have been erected on the site of an even older, Neolithic or Bronze Age-era site. The ringfort is also the location of the Burren's leading Sheepdog demonstration. |
| Caherminnaun Castle | | Caherminnaun, Kilfenora | Castle ruin | | A ruin where in 1591 Murrogh O'Brien, the Lord of Caherminnaun, died. In 1839, the site of the castle was described as "a heap of ruins and rubbish." |
| Carrigaholt Castle | | Carrigaholt | Tower house | c. 1480 | Carrigaholt Castle is a late 15th-century tower house built by the Clare McMahons for use as their primary residence. The castle, overlooking the Shannon Estuary from the north, is not open to the public. |
| Castlecrine | | County Clare | Hillslope fort | | |
| Castlecrine House | | Sixmilebridge | Country house | 1860s | Crine Castle was a late Georgian style country house that was built a Capt. Henry Butler of the Butler family around 1860 and was demolished in 1955. |
| Castlelake House | | Sixmilebridge | Country house | | |
| Craggaunowen Castle | | Quin | Tower house | 1550 | A typical tower house built in 1550 by John MacSioda MacNamara the castle was confiscated in the mid 17th century and left in ruin. In 1821, the land the tower house stood on was inherited by a Tom Steele, who carried out some restoration work. Upon his death in 1848, the castle went to his niece. The castle was renovated in 1965 by a John Hunt and is today in the possession of Shannon Heritage. |
| Doonagore Castle | | Doolin | Castle | 16th century | A lonely tower house and bawn built around 1500 by MacTurlough O'Conner upon the site of an earlier 14th century fortification located 1 kilometre (0.62 mi) from the village of Doolin, County Clare. In 1588, a ship of the Spanish Armada shipwrecked off the coast just below the castle and the town sheriff, Boetius MacClancy, arrested some 170 stranded Spaniards, then hanged them at the castle. They were buried at a nearby Iron Age barrow called Cnocán an Crochaire. By the early 19th century, the castle had fallen into disuse and disrepair, but then a counselor Gore renovated the castle. It had called into bad repair again by the mid 19th century before being purchased by Irish-American John C. Gorman, who turned the tower house into a private holiday home. It remains in the possession of the Gorman family to this day. |
| Dangan Castle | | Knocksaggart | Tower house | 13th century | Built by Philip de Clare. It was formerly a place of some strength, and was of a quadrangular form, flanked at each angle by a small round tower : from the centre rose the donjon or keep. The ruins form a picturesque object in the well-planted demesne of Dangan. |
| Doonbeg Castle | | Doonbeg | Castle ruin, tower house | 16th century | |
| Dough Castle | | | Castle ruin, tower house | | |
| Dromoland Castle | | Newmarket-on-Fergus | Restaurant, château, hotel | | restored castle, hotel |
| Dromore Castle | | County Clare, Dromore | Tower house | | |
| Dunmackelim Castle | | | | | |
| Freaghcastle | | Kilfarboy | Promontory fort, contour fort | | |
| Gleninagh Castle | | County Clare, Gleninagh North | Tower house | | |
| Gregans Castle | | | Castle | | |
| Inchiquin Castle | | Corofin | Castle ruin | | |
| Kiltanon Castle | | | | | |
| Knappogue Castle | | County Clare | Tower house | | |
| Tullagh Lower 1 | | County Clare | Contour fort | | |
| Leamaneh Castle | | County Clare | Castle ruin, castle | 1480 | |
| Milltown Castle | | | | | |
| Moher Castle | | | | | |
| Moher Tower | | County Clare | Building | 1808 | |
| Newtown Castle | | County Clare | Tower house | | |
| O'Brien's Tower | | Doolin | Folly | | |
| O'Dea Castle | | Corofin | Tower house | | |
| Teerobannan Castle | | | | | |
| Tromra Castle | | | Castle | | |
| O'Grady's Castle | | County Clare, Tuamgraney | Castle | | |
| Tullagh Fort | | | | | |
| Tyredagh Castle | | | | | |
| View Castle | | | | | |

=== County Cork ===
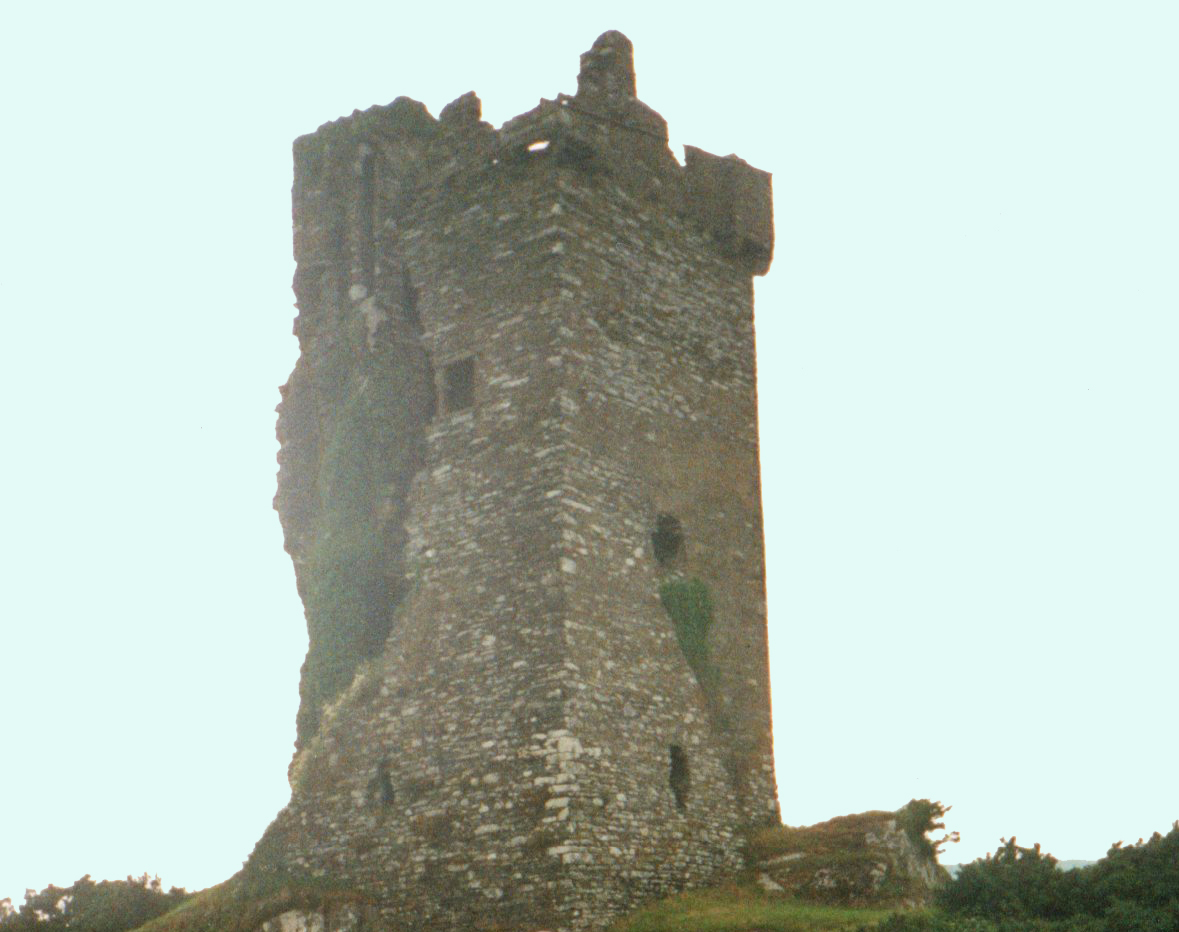
Castle Donovan

- Aghamarta Castle
- Aghamhaoila Castle
- Ballea Castle
- Ballinacarriga Castle, ruined tower house
- Ballincollig Castle, ruined castle
- Ballintotis Castle
- Ballybeg Castle
- Ballyclogh Castle
- Ballyhooly Castle
- Ballymaloe House, country house
- Ballynamona Castle
- Ballyrobert Castle
- Barrymore Castle
- Barry's Castle
- Barryscourt Castle, restored castle
- Belvelly Castle, restored castle
- Blackrock Castle, restored castle
- Blackwater Castle, restored castle
- Blarney Castle, restored castle
- Buttevant Castle
- Carrigacunna Castle
- Carrigadrohid Castle
- Carrigleamleary castle
- Carrignamuck Castle, ruined tower house, sometimes "Dripsey Castle"
- Carriganass Castle
- Carrigaphooca Castle
- Carrigboy Castle
- Carrignacurra Castle
- Carrigrohane Castle
- Castle Barrett
- Castle Bernard
- Castle Cooke
- Castle Donovan (Sowagh), ruins which underwent conservation in 2014
- Castle Downeen
- Castle Eyre
- Castle Freke, ruins in process of restoration as of 2019
- Castle Harrison (Charleville), destroyed
- Castle Hyde
- Castle Kevin
- Castle Lishen
- Castle Lyons
- Castle Magner
- Castle Mallow, see Mallow Castle
- Castle Mary
- Castle Park
- Castle Pook
- Castle Richard
- Castle Ringaskidy
- Castle Salem
- Castle Townsend
- Castle Warren
- Castle Widenham, see Widenham Castle (Castletown Castle)
- Castle White
- Castle Wrixon
- Castlemartyr Castle
- Cloghan Castle
- Conna Castle
- Coolmain Castle, restored castle previously owned by Roy Disney
- Coppingerstown Castle
- Coppingers Court
- Cor Castle
- Creagh Castle
- Cregg Castle
- Crowley Castle
- Davis' Castle
- Desmond Castle, restored castle
- Dripsey Castle, country house
- Drishane Castle, restored castle
- Dromagh Castle
- Dromaneen Castle
- Duarrigle Castle
- Dunalong Castle
- Dunasead Castle
- Dunboy Castle
- Dundareirke Castle, castle ruins
- Dunlough Castle, or Three Castles Head
- Dunmahon Castle
- Dunmanus Castle, castle ruins
- Enchicrenagh Castle ruin
- Eustace's Castle
- Garryvoe Castle, tower house ruins
- Glengarriff Castle
- Gortmore Castle
- Ightermurragh Castle, castle ruins
- Kanturk Castle
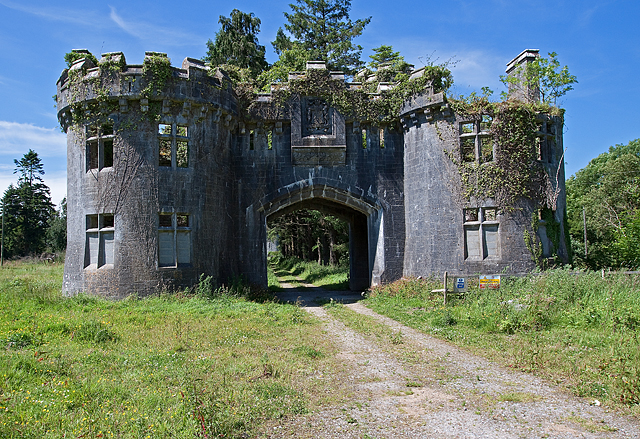
  Abandoned gatehouse, leading to Lohort Castle may have been constructed at the time the castle was renovated during the 1740s.
- Kilbolane Castle
- Kilbrittain Castle, restored castle
- Kilcaskan Castle
- Kilcolman Castle
- Kilcoe Castle, owned by English actor Jeremy Irons
- Kilcor Castle
- Kilcrea Castle, castle ruins
- Kilnannan Castle
- Lohort Castle
- Lumbard´s Castle
- Macroom Castle, castle ruins
- Mallow Castle, castle ruins
- Milltown Castle
- Mistletoe Castle
- Mitchelstown Castle, demolished
- Mogeely Castle
- Monanimy Castle
- Monkstown Castle
- Mountlong Castle
- Rathberry Castle ruin
- Ringrone Castle
- Rostellan Castle
- Siddon's Tower
- Tynte's Castle
- Wallstown Castle
- Widenham Castle, restored castle

=== County Donegal ===
- Ballyshannon Castle
- Burt Castle
- Carrickabraghy Castle
- Doe Castle/Caisleán na dTuath, Restored Castle
- Donegal Castle, Restored Castle.
- Drumboe Castle
- Glenveagh Castle, Complete Castle
- Monellan Castle
- Mongavlin Castle
- Greencastle, castle ruins
- O'Doherty Castle, castle ruins
- Rahan Castle, castle ruins
- Raphoe Castle, castle ruins

=== County Dublin ===
- Archbold's Castle, Dalkey. Intact, private property. National monument.
- Ardgillan Castle, Ardgillan Demesne, Balrothery
- Artaine Castle, Artaine
- Ashtown Castle, Phoenix Park.
- Athgoe Castle, Newcastle, intact,
- Ballyowen Castle, Lucan, ruins incorporated into the Ballyowen Castle Shopping Centre
- Balrothery Castle, intact
- Baymount Castle, Heronstown, Clontarf
- Belgard Castle, Tallaght, HQ of CRH Holdings
- Bremore Castle, Balbriggan, under repair
- Bullock Castle
- Carrickmines Castle, ruins, buried beneath recent road work
- Castle Bagot, Kilmactalway, Newcastle, intact, health spa
- Castle Mount, Clogh
- Castle Park (Castle Perrin), Monkstown, intact,
- Castleknock Castle
- Cheeverstown
- Clonskeagh Castle, Roebuck. 19th century, on site of earlier castle.
- Clontarf Castle, Clontarf. Restored Castle, Hotel.
- Conn Castle, intact
- Corr Castle
- Corrig Castle Dun Laoghaire, demolished.
- Dalkey Castle, Dalkey. Intact, 14th century. National monument.
- Donabate, intact
- Drimnagh Castle, Drimnagh. Restored Castle.
- Drumcondra Castle, Richmond. Conference centre
- Dublin Castle, Dublin City. Restored Castle
- Dundrum Castle, Dundrum. Ruins
- Dunsoghly Castle, Restored Castle
- Howth Castle, Howth.
- Grange, intact?
- Irishtown Castle, ruin
- Kilgobbin Castle, ruin,
- Killiney Castle, Scalpwilliam or Mount Mapas.
- Killininny Castle, Firhouse
- Kilsallaghan Castle
- Knocklyne (Knocklyon) Castle, Knocklyon. Intact, private residence.
- Lambay Castle, Lambay Island
- Lanestown, intact
- Lehaunstown or Laughanstown Castle, concealed within a later manor house.
- Luttrellstown Castle, Restored Castle
- Merrion Castle
- Malahide Castle, Malahide Demesne. Restored castle
- Merrion Castle, Merrion.
- Monkstown Castle, Monkstown Castlefarm. Ruin
- Murphystown, ruins, the proposed Luas line B1 runs approximately 28 m west of the ruins of Murphystown Castle and through its area of archaeological potential.
- Nangor Castle, Nangor.
- Portrane castle (Stella's Tower), intact
- Puck's Castle, Shankill. Ruin
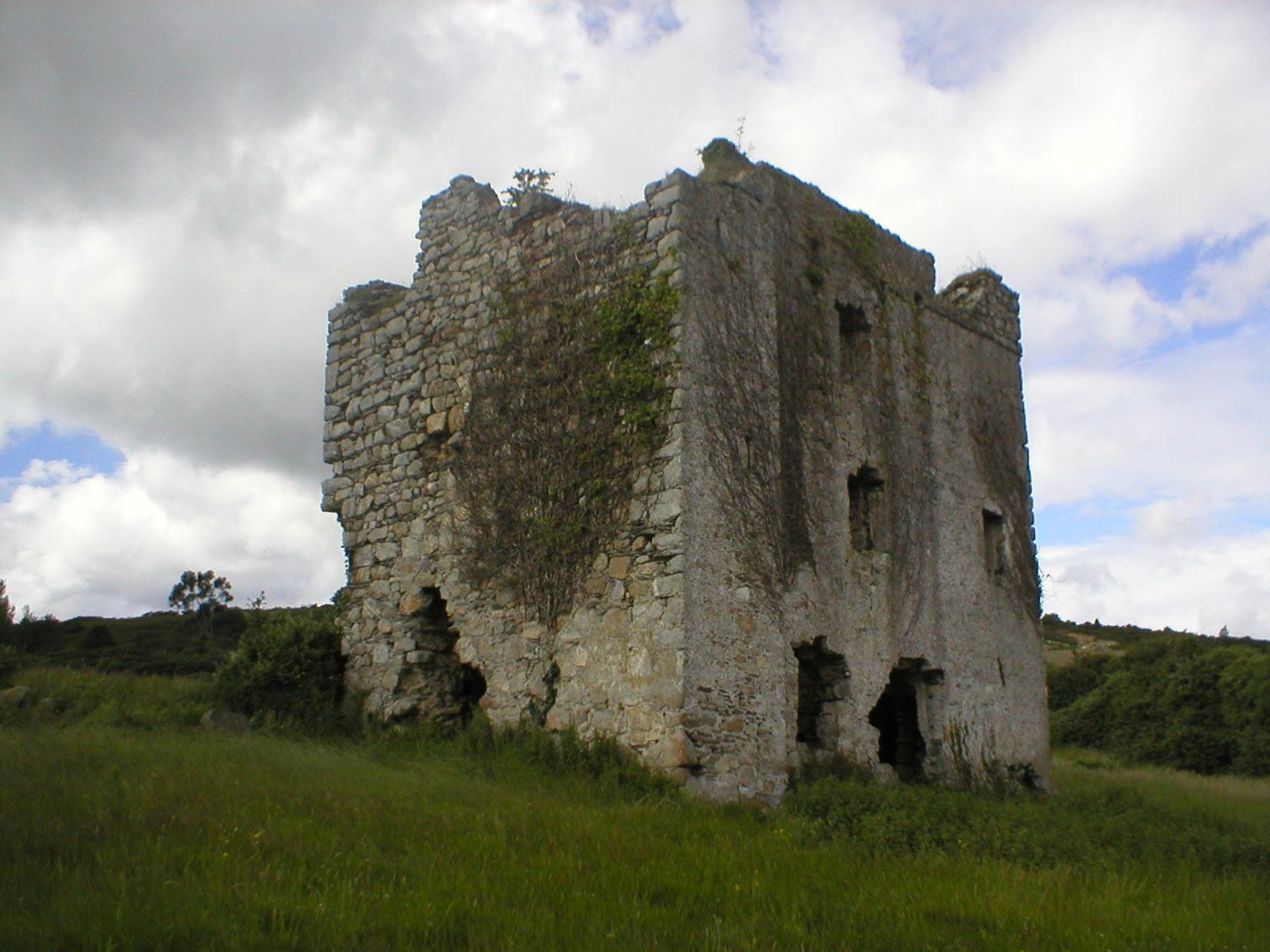
  Puck's Castle
- Rathfarnham Castle, Rathfarnham Demesne. Restored Castle
- Rathmines Castle, Rathmines West.
- Robswall, intact
- Roebuck Castle, Roebuck. Hall of residence UCD campus
- Sarsfield Castle, intact
- Shangannagh Castle, ruins, not to be confused with the late 18th-century house of the same name
- Shankill Castle, Shankill, ruin
- Simmonscourt Castle, Smotscourt
- Stillorgan Castle, Stillorgan. 18th-century house on site of earlier castle, now incorporated into the modern St John of God hospital complex. NIAH survey
- Swords Castle, castle ruins, undergoing restoration
- Tallaght Castle, Tower House, incorporated into the buildings of St. Mary's Priory in Tallaght village
- Templeogue House
- Thorncastle
- Tully's Castle, Clondalkin, ruins
- Tymon Castle, Tymon North. Demolished in the 1970s
- Williamstown Castle, Williamstown.

=== County Galway ===
- Abbeyglen Castle, restored castle
- Ardamullivan Castle, restored castle
- Athenry Castle, restored castle
- Aughnanure Castle, intact castle
- Ballindooley Castle, restored castle
- Ballinfad Castle, intact castle
- Ballymore Castle, restored castle
- Ballynahinch Castle, intact castle
- Caheradangan Castle, intact castle
- Caherkinmonwee Castle, intact castle
- Cargin Castle, restored castle
- Castle Ellen, restored castle
- Castle Kirk, castle ruins
- Castletown Castle, castle ruins
- Clifden Castle, castle ruins
- Cloghan Castle, restored castle
- Cloonacauneen Castle, restored castle
- Corofin Castle, castle ruins
- Cregg Castle, restored castle
- Derryhivenny Castle, castle ruins
- Dunguaire Castle, restored castle
- Dunmore Castle
- Dunsandle Castle, restored castle
- Eyrecourt Castle, castle ruins
- Feartagar Castle, castle ruins
- Fiddaun Castle, castle ruins
- Garbally Castle, castle ruins
- Glinsk Castle, castle ruins
- Hackett Castle, castle ruins
- Isert Kelly Castle, intact castle
- Kilcolgan Castle, intact castle
- Kylemore Abbey, Benedictine monastery
- Lynch's Castle, restored castle
- Menlow Castle (also Menlo or Menlough), castle ruins
- Monivea Castle, castle ruins
- Moyode Castle, castle ruins
- Oranmore Castle, restored castle
- Portumna Castle, restored castle
- Renvyle Castle, castle ruins
- Thoor Ballylee, W.B. Yeats' former holiday home, restored as a museum.

=== County Kerry ===
- Ardea Castle
- Ballybunnion Castle
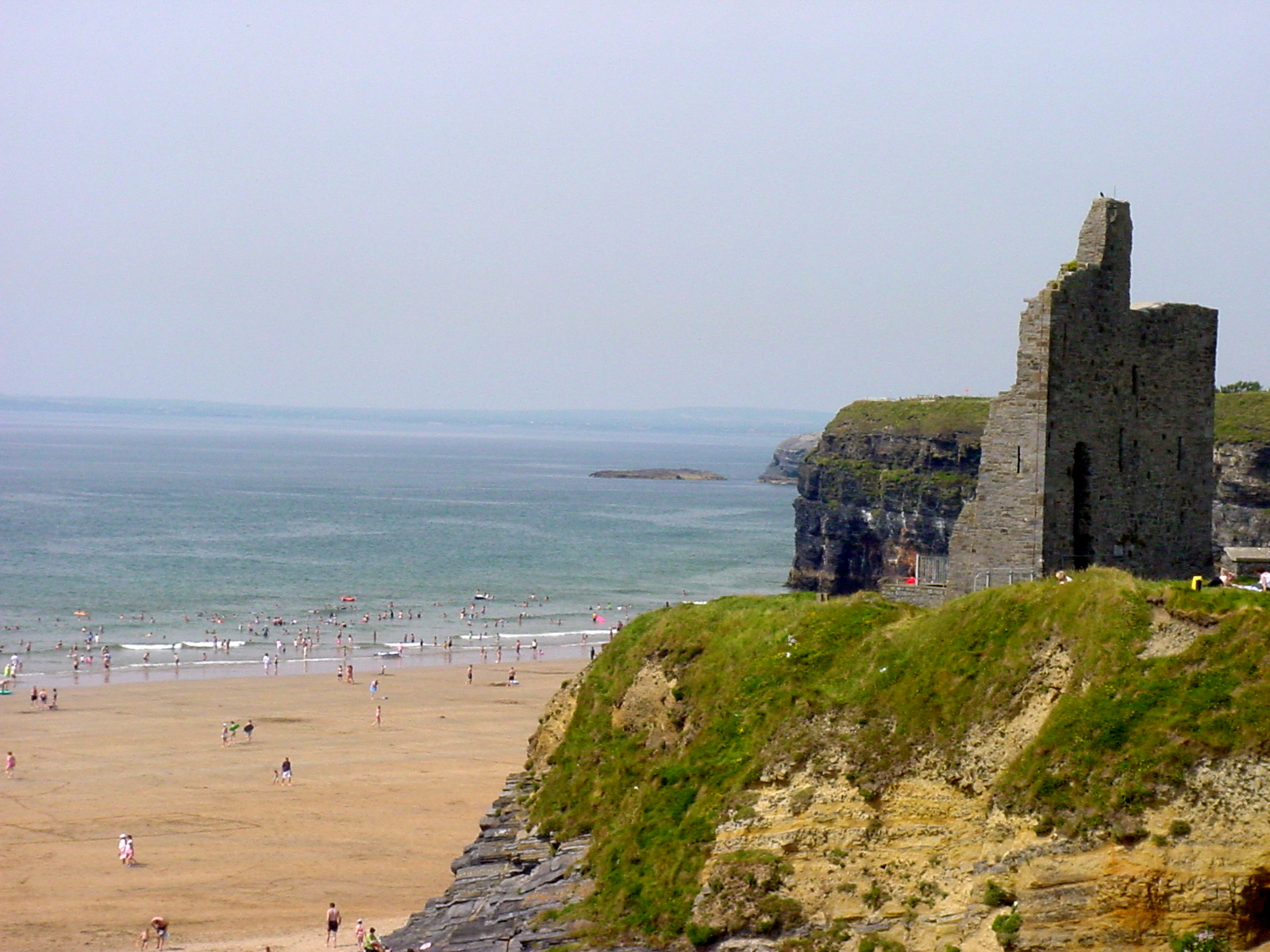
  Ballybunnion Castle
- Ballingarry Castle
- Ballinskelligs Castle
- Ballybunion Castle
- Ballycarbery Castle
- Ballycarty Castle
- Ballyheigue Castle
- Ballymalis Castle
- Ballyseedy Castle, hotel
- Cappanacush Castle
- Carrigafoyle Castle
- Carrignass Castle
- Castle Sybil
- Castle of the Island
- Derryquin Castle
- Dromore Castle
- Dunbeg Fort
- Dunkerron Castle
- Dunloe Castle
- Gallarus Castle
- Listowel Castle
- Minard Castle
- Parkavonear Castle
- Ross Castle, restored castle
- Staigue Fort

=== County Kildare ===
- Barberstown Castle, restored castle
- Barretstown Castle, restored castle
- Carbury Castle, County Kildare, castle ruins
- Carrick Castle, County Kildare
- Grange Castle, castle ruins
- Harristown Castle, castle ruins
- Jigginstown Castle (Sigginstown House), castle ruins
- Kildare Castle, castle ruins
- Kilkea Castle, restored castle
- Kilteel Castle, intact castle
- Leixlip Castle, restored castle
- Maynooth Castle, intact castle
- Rathcoffey Castle, castle ruins
- Reeves Castle, intact castle
- Rheban Castle, castle ruins
- White's Castle, restored castle

=== County Kilkenny ===
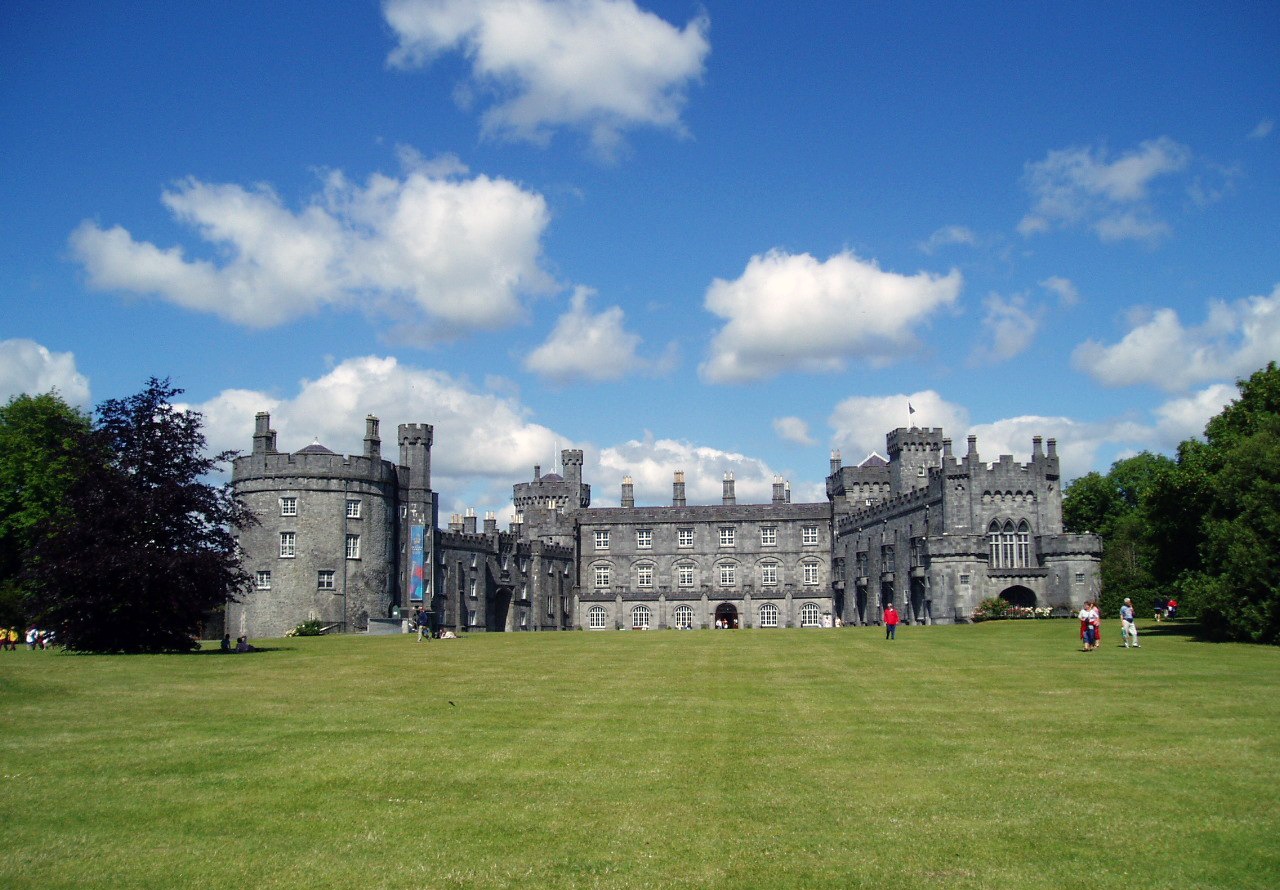
Kilkenny Castle

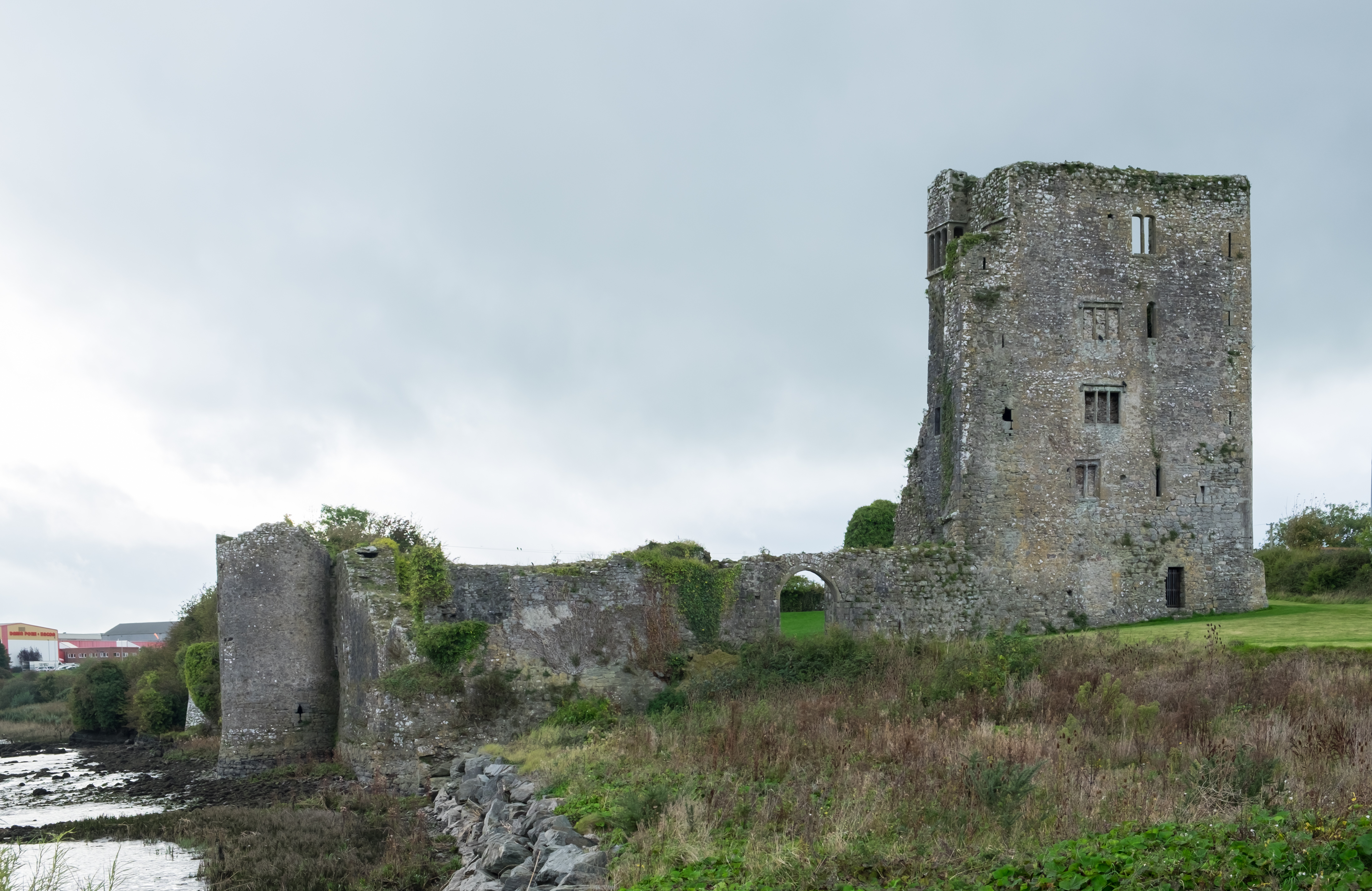
Granagh Castle

- Annaghs Castle, castle ruins
- Ballinlaw Castle, castle ruins
- Ballybur Castle, restored castle
- Ballyragget Castle, castle ruins
- Burnchurch Castle, intact castle
- Clara Castle, intact castle
- Clomantagh Castle, restored castle
- Coolhill Castle, castle ruins
- Corluddy Castle, castle ruins
- Currahill Castle, castle ruins
- Dunkitt Castle, castle ruins
- Foulksrath Castle, intact castle
- Gorteens Castle, castle ruins
- Gowran Castle, castle ruins
- Granagh Castle, castle ruins
- Kilbline Castle, intact castle
- Kilkenny Castle, restored castle
- Kilmurry Castle, castle ruins
- Maudlin Castle, restored castle
- Sandfordscourt Castle, castle ruins
- Shankill Castle, restored castle

=== County Laois ===
- Aghmacart Castle, ruins of a tower house
- Ballaghmore Castle, restored castle
- Ballinakill Castle, tower house in Ballinakill village
- Ballyadams Castle, castle ruins
- Ballyknocken Castle, very ruinous tower house
- Castle Durrow, 19th-century house on the site of a former castle
- Castlecuffe, ruins of a 17th-century fortified house
- Castle Fleming, ruins of a fortified house
- Coolbanagher Castle, Hall House which collapsed in 2014
- Clonreher Castle, intact tower house outside Portlaoise
- Cullahill Castle, castle ruins
- Dysart Castle, the remains consist of a turret of the bawn
- Fermoyle Fortified House, ruins of a fortified house
- Gortnaclea Castle, castle ruins
- Grantstown Castle, ruins of a circular tower house
- Killeany Castle, ruins of a tower house along the River Note
- Lea Castle, massive Norman ruins similar to Carlow Castle
- Rock of Dunamase, castle ruins
- Rushall Fortified House, ruins of a 17th-century fortified house
- Shaen Castle, fragment of a tower house
- Strahane Castle, ruins of a tower house
- Shrule Castle, castle ruins
- Tinnakill Castle, tower house
- Clonburren Castle, tower house

=== County Leitrim ===
- Lough Rynn Castle, restored castle
- Manorhamilton Castle, restored castle
- Parke's Castle, restored castle

=== County Limerick ===
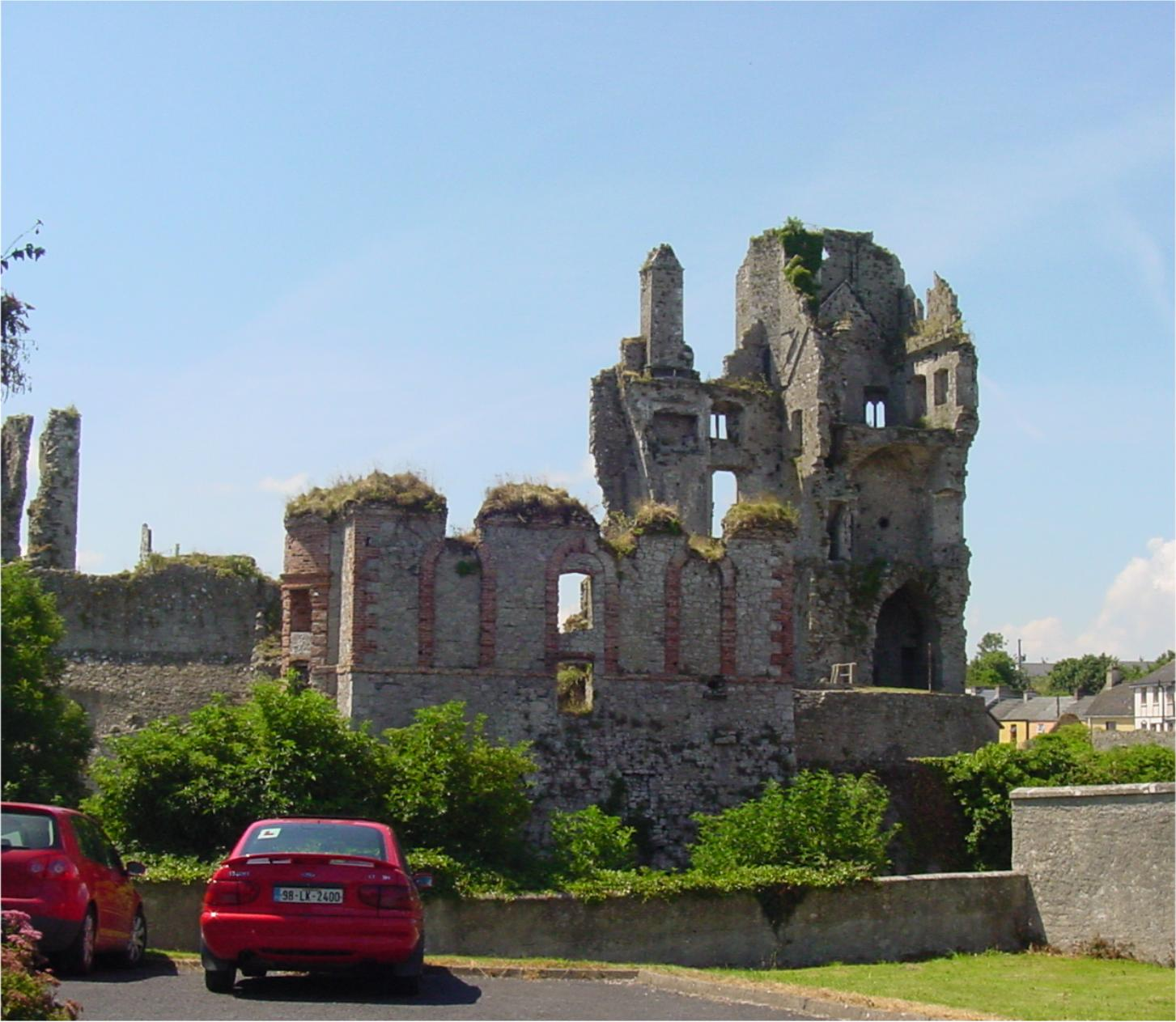
Askeaton Castle

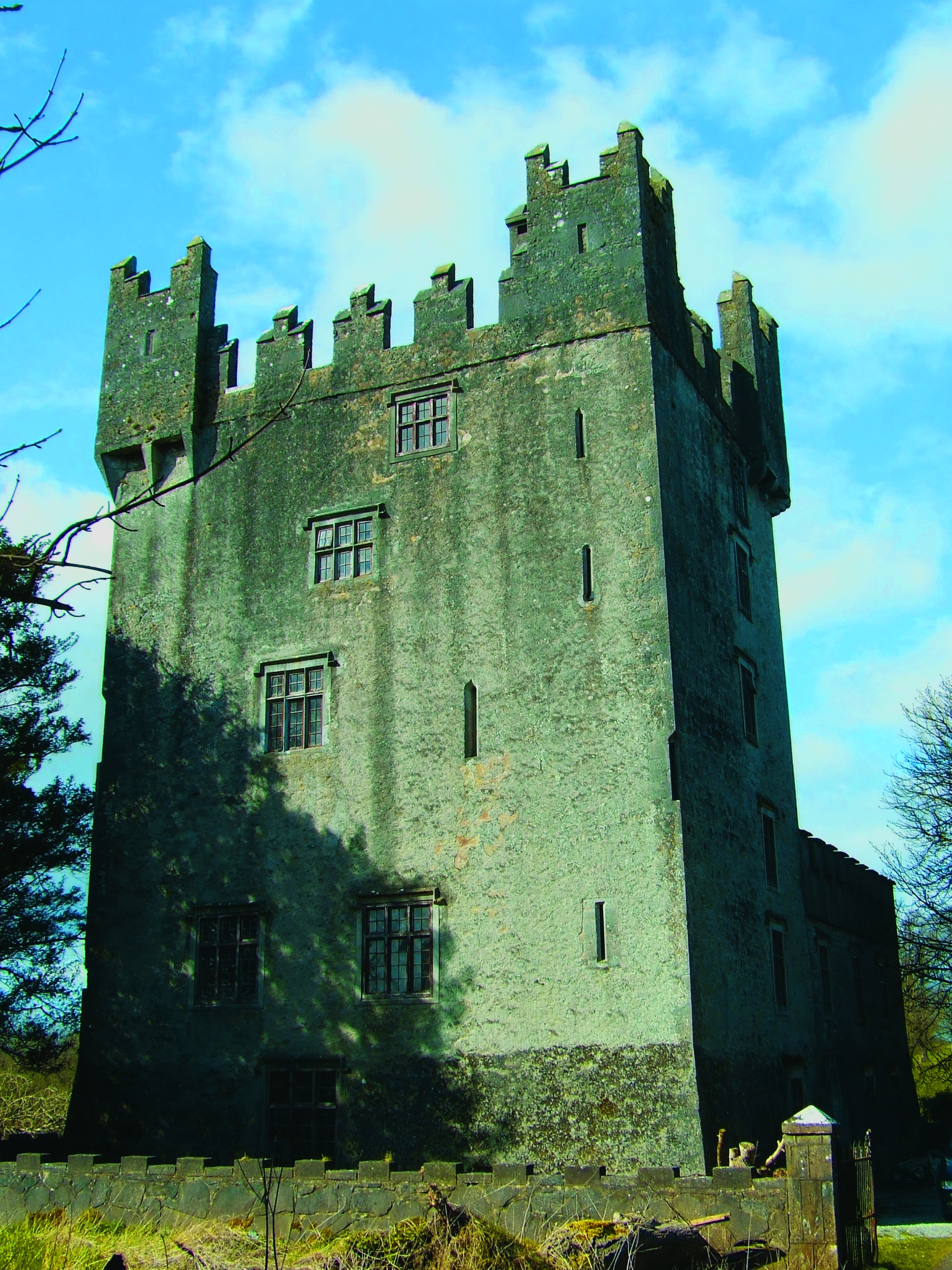
Castle Matrix near Rathkeale

- Adare Manor
- Askeaton Castle
- Ballygrennan Castle
- Black Castle
- BeaghCastle ruin
- Bourchier's Castle
- Carrigogunnell Castle
- Castle Matrix, Rathkeale restored by United States Air Force veteran Sean O'Driscoll
- Castle Oliver, also known as Clonodfoy
- Castle Troy
- Coonagh Castle
- Croom Castle
- Desmond Castle
- Dromore Castle, ruin
- Glin Castle, Hotel
- King John's Castle, Limerick City
- Lisnacullia Castle
- Oola Castle
- Rockstown Castle
- Springfield Castle
- Williamstown Castle

=== County Longford ===
- Castle Forbes, restored castle
- Moydow Castle, castle ruins

=== County Louth ===
- Ardee Castle, restored castle
- Athclare Castle, restored castle
- Barmeath Castle, restored castle
- Castle Bellingham, intact castle
- Castle Roche, castle ruins
- Castletown Castle, restored castle
- Darver Castle, restored castle
- Hatch's Castle, intact castle
- King John's Castle, restored castle
- Knockabbey Castle, restored castle
- The Mint, restored castle
- Smarmore Castle, intact castle
- Taaffe Castle, castle ruins
- Termonfeckin Castle, survivor of two tower houses, other demolished c. 1800.

=== County Mayo ===
- Aghalard Castle, castle ruins
- Ahena Castle, castle ruins
- Ashford Castle, hotel
- Belleek Castle, hotel
- Crossmolina Castle, castle ruins
- Deel Castle, castle ruins
- Doon Castle, castle ruins
- Kildavnet Castle, intact castle
- Kinlough Castle, castle ruins
- Rappa Castle, castle ruins
- Rockfleet Castle, restored castle
- Shrule Castle, castle ruins
- Turin Castle, restored castle
- Dookinella Castle

=== County Meath ===
- Donore Castle, tower house ruins
- Dunsany Castle, intact castle
- Lynches Castle, Summerhill, castle ruins
- Durhamstown Castle, intact castle
- Killeen Castle, restored castle (closed)
- Skryne Castle, restored tower house
- Slane Castle, restored castle
- Tara, former seat of the High Kings; not a castle
- Dangan Castle, Summerhill, castle ruins
- Trim Castle, part-restored castle ruin

=== County Monaghan ===
- Castle Leslie, intact mansion
- Rossmore Castle, mansion ruins
- Hope Castle, mansion ruins

=== County Offaly ===
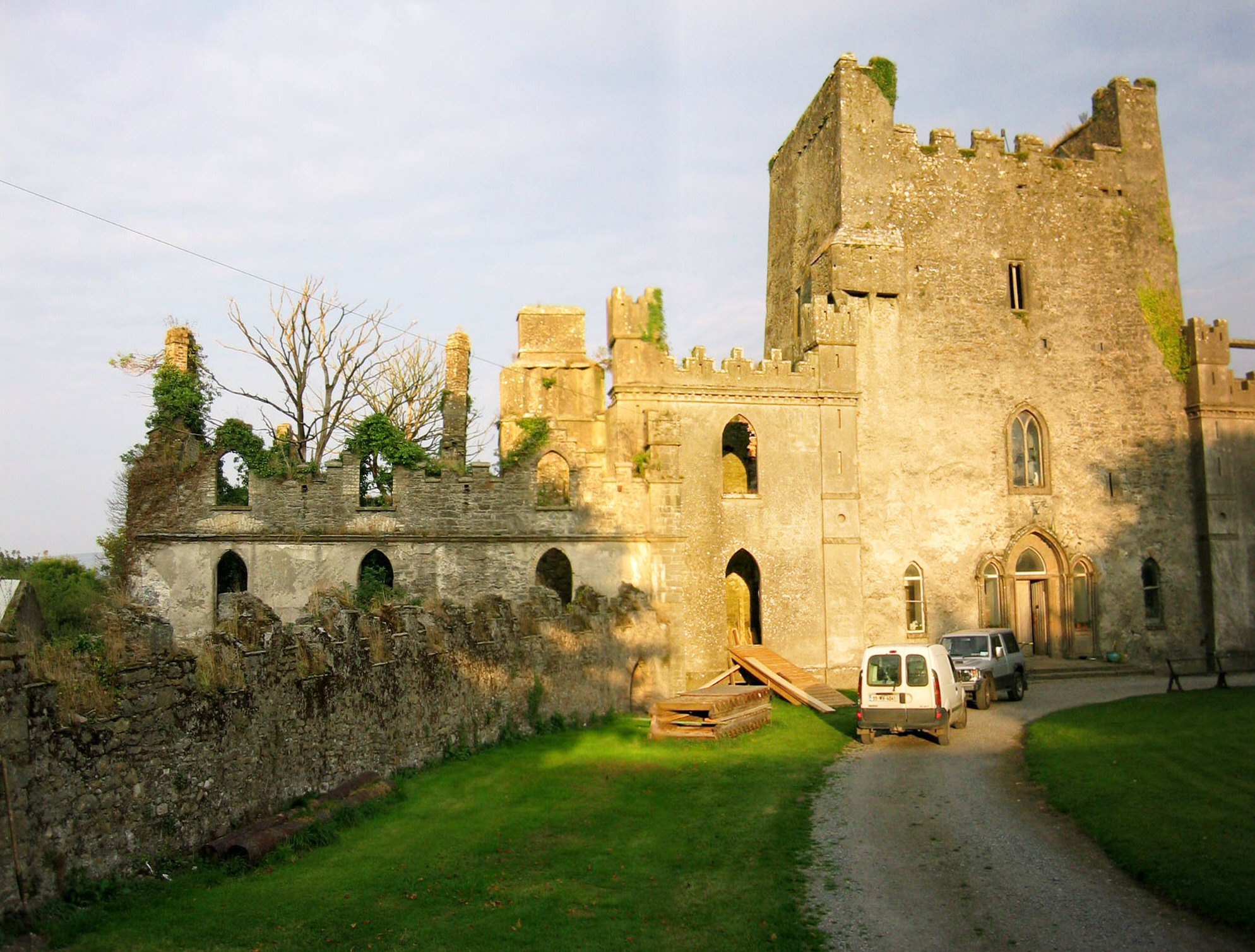
Leap Castle

- Ballycowan Castle, fortified house ruins
- Birr Castle, intact castle and demesne
- Blundell Castle, castle ruins
- Charleville Castle, intact castle
- Clara Castle (County Offaly), castle ruins
- Cloghan Castle, restored castle
- Clonmacnoise Castle, castle ruins
- Clonony Castle, tower house ruins
- Doon Castle, castle ruins
- Kinnefad Castle, County Offaly
- Kinnitty Castle, restored castle
- Kilcoursey Castle, castle ruins
- Leap Castle, restored castle
- Sragh Castle, tower house ruins

=== County Roscommon ===
- Ballintober Castle, castle ruins
- Castlecoote, Castlecoote House and castle ruins
- Donamon Castle, restored castle
- Kilronan Castle, restored castle
- McDermott's Castle, Castle Island on Lough Key. castle ruins
- Roscommon Castle, castle ruins
- Rindoon Castle, castle ruins
- Castle Sampson, castle ruins

=== County Sligo ===
- Ardtermon Castle, restored castle
- Ballinafad Castle, castle ruins
- Ballymote Castle, castle ruins
- Markree Castle, restored castle
- Moygara Castle, castle ruins
- Roslee Castle, castle ruins
- Temple House Castle, castle ruins

=== County Tipperary ===
- Annameadle Castle, castle ruins
- Ardfinnan Castle, intact castle
- Ballyfinboy Castle, castle ruins with Sheela na gig, near Borrisokane
- Ballyquirk Castle, castle ruins
- Ballynahow Castle, intact castle
- Ballysheedy Castle, castle ruins
- Black Castle, Templemore, castle ruins
- Black Castle, Thurles, castle destroyed
- Cahir Castle, restored castle
- Carrigeen Castle, restored castle
- Clonakenny Castle, castle ruins
- Castle Fogarty, restored castle
- Cranagh Castle, intact castle
- Farney Castle , restored castle
- Kilcash Castle, castle ruins
- Killaghy Castle, restored castle
- Killahara Castle, restored castle
- Knockgraffan, early ráth
- Lackeen Castle, tower house near Lorrha where the Lorrha Missal was discovered in the 18th century.
- Lisheen Castle, restored castle
- Loughmoe Castle, castle ruins
- Moorstown Castle, castle ruins, located between Clonmel and Cahir.
- Nenagh Castle, intact castle
- Ormonde Castle, Manor House.
- Redwood Castle, Tower House near Lorrha
- Rock of Cashel, restored castle
- Roscrea Castle, intact castle
- Shanbally Castle, demolished
- Slevoyre House, restored castle

=== County Waterford ===
- Ballycanvan Castle, castle ruins
- Ballyclohy Castle, castle ruins
- Ballyheeny Castle, castle ruins
- Ballymaclode Castle, castle ruins
- Barnakile Castle, castle ruins
- Carrowncashlane Castle, castle ruins
- Clonea Castle, castle ruins
- Coolnamuck Castle, castle ruins
- Crooke Castle, castle ruins
- Cullen Castle, castle ruins
- Derrinlaur Castle, castle ruins
- Dungarvan Castle, restored castle
- Dunhill Castle, castle ruins
- Dunmore East Castle, castle ruins
- Faithlegg Castle
- Feddans Castle, castle ruins
- Fox's Castle, castle ruins
- Glen Castle, castle ruins
- Greenan Castle
- Kilmeaden Castle, castle ruins
- Kincor Castle, castle ruins
- Lismore Castle, restored castle
- Loughdeheen Castle, castle ruins
- MacGrath's Castle, castle ruins
- Mountain Castle, castle ruins
- Rathgormuck Castle, castle ruins
- Reginald's Tower, part of the old city walls of Waterford
- Rockett's Castle, castle ruins
- Sleady Castle, castle ruins
- Strancally Castle, castle ruins
- Waterford Castle, restored castle, now a hotel

=== County Westmeath ===
| Name | Image | Location | Type | Date | Notes |
|---|---|---|---|---|---|
| Athlone Castle | | Athlone 53°25′24″N 7°56′33″W | Castle | 1210 | A castle located on the River Shannon in the town of Athlone, near the centre of Ireland, and possibly standing on the site of an earlier timber keep built by King Tairrdelbach Ua Conchobair of Connacht in the 12th century, The current structure began with the castle's donjon upon the motte and was later expanded upon via a curtain wall and corner towers circa 1276 by Bishop John de Gray of Norwich. The castle was again renovated in 1547 by Sir William Brabazon, Lord Justice of Ireland, only to be battered in the Siege of Athlone and finally destroyed by lightning in 1697. Since the Napoleonic Era, the castle has been modified and refurbished until 2002 when today's visitor center was constructed. The visitor center underwent renovation in 2012. |
| Ballinlough Castle | | Clonmellon 53°38′2.4″N 7°1′33.6″W | Country house | 1614 | A country house and seat of the Nugent O'Reillys (since 1812) built in 1614, according to the O'Reilly coat of arms above the door. Since its construction, the Nugents have maintained the estate. |
| Clonyn Castle | | Delvin 53°37′0″N 7°6′0″W | Country house | 1639 | In 1639, Richard Nugent, 1st Earl of Westmeath, built for himself a residence on a small hill near the village of Delvin. The castle was burned by a panicked Richard Nugent to prevent its capture by Cromwellian forces. Some time later in 1680, the current building was completed in 1860 and reoccupied by the Nugents until 1922 when Patrick Nugent sold it and moved to Scotland. After Solomon Schonfeld went bankrupt attempting to help Jewish refugee children, the castle fell into the hands of the Dillon family and has remained such for over 25 years. |
| Killua Castle | | Clonmellon 53°39′34.34″N 6°59′46.34″W | Country house | 1780 | In 1780, Sir Benjamin Chapman, 1st Baronet, tore down an old Knights Hospitallers castle confiscated by Cromwell in 1667 and built the current structure. Renovations to the house and grounds including the nearby Raleigh Obelisk in 1810 were completed in the following decades before the Baronet died with Montagu Richard, 5th baronet and the subsequent dissolving of the property. The castle sat as an empty ruin until 2004, when renovations aimed at restoring the castle as a private residence began. |
| Knockdrin Castle | | Mullingar 53°34′25″N 7°18′54″W | Mansion | c. 1815 | In 1810, Sir Richard Levinge commissioned Sir Richard Morrison for two designs of a private residence. However, it is believed that a design from noted contemporary architect James Shiel was the one used to construct the house. |
| Moydrum Castle | | Athlone 53.4281°N 7.8628°W | Country house | c. 1814 | |
| Nugent Castle | | Delvin 53°36′38″N 7°05′33″W | Keep | 1181 | |
| Portlick Castle | | Glassan 53°28′58.8″N 7°54′0″W | Tower house | | |
| Rattin Castle | | Kinnegad 53°44′39″N 17°13′1″W | Tower house | | |
| Tullynally Castle | | Castlepollard 53°40′59.56″N 7°19′40.26″W | Country house | | |
| Tyrrellspass Castle | | Tyrrellspass 53°23′9.6″N 7°22′51.6″W | Bawn | c. 1411 | |

=== County Wexford ===
- Adamstown Castle - tower house
- Baldwinstown Castle - castle ruins
- Ballyteigue Castle - tower house
- Ballyhack Castle, restored castle
- Ballyhealy Castle, restored Norman castle
- Bargy Castle, restored castle.
- Barntown Castle, tower house and castle ruins
- Clougheast Castle, restored castle
- Dungulph Castle, intact castle
- Enniscorthy Castle, restored castle
- Ferns Castle, castle ruins. OPW info
- Ferrycarrig Castle, castle ruins
- Johnstown Castle, intact castle
- Mountgarret Castle (New Ross), castle ruins
- Rathlannon Castle, castle ruins
- Rathmacknee Castle, castle ruins
- Sigginstown Castle, castle ruins
- Slade Castle, castle ruins
- Tellarought Castle (New Ross), castle ruins

=== County Wicklow ===
- Carnew Castle, Carnew. Tower house ruins, built in the late 16th century.
- Castle Howard Wicklow, intact castle with the addition of a 19th-century Mansion.
- Dunganstown Castle, Dunganstown. Remains of a large late-17th century U-plan house and early 17th-century tower.
- Glenart Castle, Arklow. Intact castle in use as a hotel.
- Fassaroe Castle, Bray. Built in 1536 by 'Master Tresover'. In ruins.
- Kiltegan Castle, Kiltegan, intact castle
- Kiltimon Castle, Newcastle. C.1550, now in use as a folly.
- Kindlestown Castle, Delgany. Castle ruins
- Oldcourt Castle, Bray. Built by the Earl of Ormond in 1433. In ruins.
- Ormonde Castle, Arklow. Castle ruins, built in 1169 on an old Viking site and destroyed by Oliver Cromwell's army in the 17th century.
- Rathdown Castle. Ruined by the 17th century, very little remains.
- Threecastles Castle, Manor Kilbride, Blessington. Largely intact late 14th/15th-century castle marking the boundary of the Pale.
- The Black Castle, Wicklow Town (now ruins). In 834 AD the Vikings fortified a strategic rocky promontory at the mouth of the Vartry River in Wicklow Town. Following the Norman invasion a castle was subsequently built, now known as the Black Castle. Between 1295 and 1315 the castle was attacked and burnt down twice by the local O'Byrne Clan.

== Northern Ireland ==
=== County Antrim ===
| Name | Image | Location | Type | Date | Notes |
|---|---|---|---|---|---|
| Antrim Castle or Massereene Castle | | Antrim 54°43′19.2″N 6°13′51.6″W | Country house | 1613–1622 | Built by Sir Hugh Clotworthy alongside an earlier motte, the plantation castle was besieged unsuccessfully in 1641 and again in 1648. It was extended in the 1660s by Viscount Massereene and rebuilt as a Georgian country house in 1813. This was expanded in 1887 but burned down in 1921, possibly due to arson. The ruins were later demolished, though the castle gardens have been restored. The castle is reputedly haunted by the ghost of a servant girl nicknamed the "White Lady." |
| Ballycastle Castle | | Ballycastle 55°12′3.6″N 6°15′0″W | Demolished | 15th century 1564; 1652 | The castle that gave Ballycastle its name stood in the Diamond at the centre of town. The ruins were removed in 1850. |
| Ballygally Castle | | Ballygally 54°53′52.8″N 5°51′28.8″W | Tower house | 1625 | James Shaw of Greenock, Scotland, built the tower house and it remained in his family until 1820. It was used as a coastguard station from the 1830s, but reverted to a dwelling in the late 19th century. In 1938, it was converted into a hotel and a new wing was added. In addition to being run as a hotel since the 1950s and being a Grade A listed site, this is also one of the most haunted buildings in all of Ireland. |
| Ballylough Castle | | Bushmills 55°10′30″N 6°30′46.8″W | Tower house | 15th century | The castle was a seat of the MacQuillans, and was attacked and captured by the O'Donnells in 1544. In the 18th century, the estate was the property of the Traill family, who built Ballylough House nearby. The ruins of the castle were repaired for use as a dovecote in the 1820s. Two walls remain in the grounds of Ballylough House. |
| Belfast Castle | | Belfast 54°38′34.8″N 5°36′31.2″W | Country house | 1870 | The original Belfast Castle, built in the 12th century, was located in the city centre, but burned down in 1708. The present house was built by the Marquess of Donegall on the hills to the north of the city. It was designed by John Lanyon in the Scottish Baronial style. It later passed to the Earl of Shaftesbury, and was granted to the Corporation of Belfast in 1935. The house was opened to the public as a venue for weddings and dances and remains in use for this purpose, having been extensively restored in the 1980s. |
| Carra Castle | | Cushendun 55°7′58.8″N 6°2′13.2″W | Hall house | 14th century | Little is known of this site, which is thought to have been built in the early 14th century, though it is traditionally believed to be the place where Shane O'Neill was killed by the MacDonnells in 1567. Archaeological investigation suggests use of the abandoned building as a cillín (infant's' burial ground) in the 16th century. |
| Carrickfergus Castle | | Carrickfergus 54°42′46.8″N 5°48′2.16″W | Norman castle | 1177 | The tower and inner ward were built by John de Courcy, who led the Norman invasion of Ulster in the 12th century. The castle served as his base of operations until it was seized from him in 1204 by Hugh de Lacy. King John captured the castle for the English crown in 1210. It was held by Hugh de Lacy in the 13th century, who set about construction of the outer walls and gatehouse. It later returned to the English crown, and was besieged several times. Improvements were made, in the 16th and 17th centuries, in order to accommodate artillery. The castle was captured by the French in 1760 and afterward served as a military outpost, housing an armoury, magazine and prison. It was given into state care in 1928, and remains open to tourists as a historic monument. |
| Dunaneeny Castle | | Ballycastle 55°12′39.6″N 6°15′0″W | Ruins | 16th Century | Established by Alexander MacDonnell on the site of a promontory fort overlooking Port Brittas (now known as Ballycastle Bay). The castle is the purported birthplace of Scottish-Irish chief Sorley Boy MacDonnell. Only the foundations of the gatehouse are now visible, on the cliffs near a caravan park. |
| Dunluce Castle | | Portballintrae 55°12′39.6″N 6°34′44.4″W | Castle | 13th century | Built by Richard de Burgh, second Earl of Ulster, on the site of a 10th-century fort possibly built by the Vikings. In 1513 the castle was occupied by the MacQuillans, who lost it in the mid 13th century to the MacDonnells and they made the castle their principal residence. In 1588, the Girona (ship), a galleass of the Spanish Armada, wrecked on the coast directly below the castle, so the MacDonnell chief, Somerled MacDonnell, took the ship's cannon and mounted it in the castle and used the profit from selling the ship's cargo to renovate the castle. Though the castle remained in the hands of the MacDonnell clan, they would eventually move the center of their power to Glenarm Castle. |
| Dunseverick Castle | | Dunseverick 55°14′16.8″N 6°26′52.8″W | Ruins | 9th century | This coastal site was blessed by Saint Patrick and raided by Vikings in the 9th century. By 1560 the castle was held by Sorley Boy MacDonnell, but was taken from him by Shane O'Neill that same year. It was held by the O'Cahans in the 17th century, but was destroyed by a Scottish army under General Munro during the Rebellion of 1641. Only the ruins of the gatehouse remain standing. |
| Galgorm Castle | | Ballymena 54°51′25.2″N 6°19′1.2″W | Bawn and Country house | c. 1607 | Galgorm Castle is a mid-17th-century country house, probably built for Dr. Alexander Colville, within a bawn wall of the early 17th century. It was renovated in the 1830s by the Earl Mount Cashell. It is a grade A listed building and remains a private residence. |
| Glenarm Castle | | Glenarm 54°57′57.6″N 5°57′21.6″W | Country house | 1636 | Glenarm was the site of a medieval tower house, which was ruined by the mid 18th century when Alexander MacDonnell, 5th Earl of Antrim, commissioned Christopher Myers to rebuild it as his principal residence. The MacDonnells completed the castle for their residence in 1636 in the Palladian style, and extended it in the 1780s. In the 1820s, Anne, Countess of Antrim, commissioned Sir Richard and William Vitruvius Morrison to remodel the house and build the gatehouse in a "Jacobethan" style. The house was gutted by fire in 1929 and damaged by another fire in 1966, but was restored each time. It remains in the MacDonnell family and is a grade A listed building. |
| Kinbane Castle | | Ballycastle 55°13′44.4″N 6°17′27.6″W | Ruins | 1547 | Constructed by Colla MacDonnell on a coastal promontory in 1547, it was damaged by the cannons of the English under Sir James Croft in 1551. It was besieged again in 1555 and Colla died at the castle in 1558. In the 17th century it was held by the MacAlisters, and was occupied into the 18th century. The ruins came into state care in the 1970s, and comprise the remains of curtain wall and a ruined tower. |
| Kilwaughter Castle | | Larne 54°50′31.2″N 5°53′16.8″W | Country house | 1807 | The present Georgian style house, which incorporated an earlier Scottish baronial Plantation house built in 1622, was commissioned in 1807 by Edward Jones-Agnew to designs by John Nash.It was not completed until 1830, with further alterations continuing into the 1850s. It passed by marriage to an Italian family, and by 1939 it was owned by two sisters who lived in Italy. With the outbreak of the Second World War it was seized by the Custodian of Enemy Property, and used as a military training camp until 1945. The abandoned building was stripped and its roof was removed in the 1950s, and remains an empty shell. |
| Lissanoure Castle | | Loughguile 55°3′18″N 6°19′58.8″W | | | A medieval castle stood at Loch Guile, which was replaced by the Macartneys in the 18th century. This was rebuilt in the 19th century but subsequently demolished. Only the estate buildings now remain, constructed using stone from the castle. |
| Olderfleet Castle | | Larne 54°50′42″N 5°48′32.4″W | Tower | 16th century | Probably built in the 16th century as a fortified storehouse and watchtower, overlooking the entrance to Larne Lough. This building was known as Coraine or The Curran. A separate structure, known as the "Olderfleete," was located to the north-west, though nothing of this remains. |
| Rathlin Castle or Bruce's Castle | | Rathlin Island 55°17′49.2″N 6°10′8.4″W | Ruins | | Limited remains of a medieval castle stand on a promontory on the island's east coast. It is said to have been the location where Robert the Bruce, King of Scots, stayed in 1306 after his flight from Scotland. |
| Red Bay Castle | | Glenariff 55°4′1.2″N 6°3′18″W | Ruins | 13th century 1604 | Sir James MacDonnell built a castle here in 1563, on the site of an earlier promontory fort. This was attacked and destroyed by Shane O'Neill two years later, but rebuilt by Sorley Boy MacDonnell in 1568. The site was robbed of stones for the repair of Dunluce Castle, but was restored in 1604. Cromwell's troops destroyed it once more in 1652 and only fragments of masonry remain above ground. |
| Shane's Castle | | Randalstown 54°43′55.2″N 6°16′12″W | Country house | 1345 | A series of buildings have stood on this site, a major seat of the O'Neills. A late medieval tower house forms the core of the complex, which was extended in the 17th century. This was replaced by a large country house in the 18th century. The Earl O'Neill commissioned John Nash to build a new extension in the early 19th century, but these were left unfinished when the main house burned down in 1816. The ruins of the various buildings are now in state care and open to the public. |
| Castle Upton | | Templepatrick 54°42′14.4″N 6°5′27.6″W | Country house | 1610 | Built as a tower house by Sir Robert Norton, it was sold in 1625 to Captain Henry Upton of Cornwall. His descendant, John Upton, 1st Viscount Templetown, commissioned Robert Adam to remodel the house, extending it in a picturesque castellated style. The 2nd Viscount commissioned further remodeling by Edward Blore. The house was restored in the later 20th century and remains a private residence. |

=== County Armagh ===
| Name | Image | Location | Type | Date | Notes |
|---|---|---|---|---|---|
| Creevekeeran Castle | | Keady 54°16′33.6″N 6°47′45.6″W | Bawn | | Creevekeeran was an impressive O'Neill bawn with a moat built next to Hanslough Lake. Today, only one tower remains standing of the mighty bawn. |
| Fathom Castle | | Newry | Bawn | 1550s | Fathom Castle, once a stronghold of the O'Neill clan, was built by Shane O'Neill. Fathom castle was seized during the Nine Years' War and then demolished in 1730 for the construction of a canal. |
| Gosford Castle | | Markethill 54°18′38.59″N 6°31′06.59″W | Country house | 1850s | The Acheson family built a Plantation castle around 1617, though this was destroyed in the rebellion of 1641. It was replaced by a manor house which was occupied until around 1840. In 1819, Archibald Acheson, 2nd Earl of Gosford commissioned Thomas Hopper to design the present castle. The Norman-revival style castle was completed around 1859, though the family vacated it in the 1920s. It was sold to the Ministry of Agriculture in 1958, and was briefly a hotel in the 1980s. After a period of neglect it was sold on to developers in 2006, though the proposed residential renovation stalled in 2010. |
| Killeavy Castle | | Meigh 54°7′22.8″N 6°24′36″W | Country house | 1836 | Originally a farmhouse called Killeavy Lodge, it was expanded by Newry banker Powell Foxall to create the present Gothic revival castle, designed by George Papworth. It was later owned by the Bell family but fell into disrepair in the later 20th century. It was sold in 2012 to owners wishing to restore the building. |
| Lurgan Castle or Brownlow House | | Lurgan 54°27′54″N 6°19′40.8″W | Country house | 1833 | Brownlow House, known locally as "Lurgan Castle," is a distinctive mansion built in 1833 with Scottish sandstone in an Elizabethan style with a lantern-shaped tower and prominent array of chimney pots. It was originally owned by the Brownlow family, and today is owned by the Lurgan Loyal Orange District Lodge. The adjacent Lurgan Park, now a public park owned by Craigavon Borough Council, used to be part of the same estate. |
| Moyry Castle | | Jonesborough 54°4′12″N 6°23′6″W | Bawn | 1601 | A small tower built by Charles Blount, one of the Queen's most ruthless and effective generals, during the Siege of Kinsale in 1601 to secure Moyry Pass and crush the power of the O'Neills in the Gap of the North. |
| Tandragee Castle, or Tayto Castle. | | Tandragee 54°21′14.4″N 6°25′1.2″W | Country house | 1837 | In 332, the O'Hanlon clan built a fortress called Tonregue Castle here to help drive their foes from County Armagh, but that fortress was burned down by Irish rebels in 1641. Almost two hundred years later in 1837, Duke George Montagu built the current castle to serve as the residence of the Montagu family in Ireland. In the 1950s, the castle and estate were sold by Alexander Montagu to a business man from Tandragee by the name of Mr. Hutchison, and so the castle came to house the Tayto potato crisp factory and the park's demesne incorporates a golf course. |

=== County Down ===
| Name | Image | Location | Type | Date | Notes |
|---|---|---|---|---|---|
| Ardglass Castle | | Ardglass 54°15′30″N 5°36′20″W | Country house | Late 18th century | Built on top of the row of 15th-century warehouses that most of the other castles in Ardglas were built to protect, Ardglass Castle is a manor house built by Lord Charles Fitzgerald around 1790. Since 1911, it forms part of the Arglass Golf Club's course as the Club House. Parts of the original structure, namely walls, still stand towards the east end of the property. |
| Audley's Castle | | Strangford 54°22′44.4″N 5°34′22.8″W | Bawn | 15th century | Audley Castle is a 15th-century bawn constructed by its namesake the Audleys on a rocky hill 1.6 kilometres (0.99 mi) from Strangford Lough. In 1646, the tower passed into the keeping of the Wards of Castle Ward. In the 18th century the tower was incorporated into the parks of the Castle Ward estate. The tower remains standing though the bawn is largely ruined. |
| Bagenal's Castle | | Newry 54°10′22.8″N 6°20′9.6″W | Tower house | 16th century | English soldier Nicholas Bagenal built the tower house as his residence in around 1578, on the site of Newry's medieval abbey. It remained in his family until the 18th century, after which it was altered, and it became part of a bakery in 1894. The significance of the building was only noted in 1996 after the bakery closed; it has since been restored and now houses the Newry and Mourne Museum. |
| Bangor Castle | | Bangor 54°39′21.6″N 5°40′8.4″W | Country house | 1852 | Robert Edward Ward had the house constructed in 1852 to replace a 17th-century building on the site. The architect was probably William Burn, with Anthony Salvin having designed the separate stables building. It was the home of Lord Clanmorris in the early 20th century, and on the death of his widow in 1941 the estate was bought by Bangor Council. The house has served as Bangor Town Hall since 1952. |
| Bright Castle | | Downpatrick 54°16′30″N 5°41′16.8″W | Tower house | 15th–16th centuries | Built in the late 15th or early 16th century, the castle may have been demolished by Lord Grey in 1538. Only the eastern half remains standing. |
| Carrowdore Castle | | Donaghadee 54°34′51.6″N 5°32′34.8″W | | | |
| Castlewellan Castle | | Castlewellan 54°15′50.4″N 5°57′18″W | Country house | 1856 | A Scottish baronial castle built by the Annesley family between 1856 and 1858. It is located in Castlewellan Forest Park and is now used as a Christian conference centre. |
| Clough Castle | | Clough 54°17′24″N 5°49′55.2″W | Motte-and-bailey | 11th century | A small motte and bailey castle built by John de Courcy 11th century following the Anglo-Norman invasion of Ireland in timber and earth with some stone. Though it has fallen into ruin, Clough Castle is today one of the best preserved examples of a Motte and Bailey in Ireland. |
| Cowd Castle or Choud Castle | | Ardglass 54°15′29.52″N 5°36′20.52″W | Bawn | 15th–16th centuries | Located across the street from Margaret castles stands Cowd castle, a small two-story tower house built in either the late 15th or early 16th centuries as part of a larger structure built with the intention of protecting the local area and its trade. In 1791, Lord Charles Fitzgerald demolished much of that structure castle for his mansion, Ardglass Castle. |
| Dundrum Castle | | Dundrum 54°15′46.8″N 5°50′45.6″W | Castle | 13th century | Dundrum Castle (not to be confused with Dublin's Dundrum Castle) was built by John de Courcy after his invasion of Ulster to control access to Lecale from the west and the south. It was built upon a tall, rocky hill and thus commands fine views of the Dundrum Bay and Mourne Mountains, and the lands west towards Slieve Croob and the plains of Lecale to the east. Dundrum castle has undergone several modifications such as the round keep added by King John, its current lopsided design from Hugh de Lacy's second term as Earl of Ulster, and the Outer bailey that was built by the Magennis family in the late 15th century. The castle was demolished in 1652. Dundrum is a Scheduled monument. |
| Greencastle | | Kilkeel 54°2′27.6″N 6°5′49.2″W | Castle | c. 1230 | Greencastle is a 15 and 16th century castle built on the site of a Motte-and-bailey possibly built by Hugh de Lacy in the 13th century. Local folklore also has it that John de Courcy was married here. The castle served as an English garrison in Northern Ireland for several hundred years before Cromwellian soldiers subjected it to destruction by artillery fire to prevent its usage by Irish rebels. |
| Hillsborough Castle | | Hillsborough 54°27′39.6″N 6°5′9.6″W | Georgian Country house | 1770s | A Georgian manor house owned the Queen that served as the resident of the Governor of Northern Ireland until 1973 and now serves as the official residence of the Secretary of State for Northern Ireland as well as the official residence of the Queen in Northern Ireland. Hillsborough Castle and the (at that time) village of Hillsborough were constructed in the 1770s Wills Hill, the first Marquess of Downshire, for the Hill family and was in the keeping of the Hill family until 1922. |
| Jordan's Castle | | Ardglass 54°15′36″N 5°36′32.4″W | Tower house | 15th century | Jordan's Castle is a rectangular, four story tall tower house in Ardglass, County Down. Built by Simon Jordan to defend against the Tyrone Rebellion for three years until he was relieved by Baron Charles Bluont in 1601. In 1911, Belfast antiquarian Francis Joseph Bigger bought the castle, restored it and used it to display his extensive collection of antiquities and made it freely accessible to everyone to bring local people "in touch with the Irish past, and give them some conception of the historic background of their life." |
| King's Castle | | Ardglass 54°15′32.4″N 5°36′28.8″W | Tower house | 12th century | Easily the largest medieval structure in Ardglass, King's Castle is a tower house originally built in the 12th century and modified extensively in following centuries. Was rebuilt in the 19th century and reopened as a nursing home, which it remains even today, following a collapse of the building in 1830 after failed attempts to repair the foundation of the building. |
| Kilclief Castle | | Strangford 54°19′40.8″N 5°33′14.4″W | Tower house | 1412–1443 | The oldest known tower in Lecale, having been erected in the window of time from 1412 to 1443 and probably by John Sely, Bishop of Down, Kilclief Castle is very similar in construction to Jordan's Castle and is notably less ruined. Later, the building was garrisoned by 11 English soldiers during the Irish Nine Years' War from 1601 to 1602. |
| Killyleagh Castle | | Killyleagh 54°24′7.2″N 5°39′14.4″W | Castle | 1180 | In its current presentation, Killyleagh Castle is as architect Sir Charles Lanyon designed it: a Loire Valley style château built in the mid 18th century. Possibly one of the oldest continuously inhabited castles in Ireland, Killyleagh Castle was first constructed by Norman knight John de Courcy in 1180, one of many such fortifications to protect the Strangford Lough against Viking incursion. Since its early beginnings, the castle has been important to the history of the local region (County Down), having a pivotal role to play in events from local lords in the Dark Ages fighting against English rule, local fighting against the English connected to the fall of the Stuarts, and even local combat against the Irish Republican Army in the 1920s. |
| Kirkistown Castle | | Cloghy 54°26′31.2″N 5°27′57.6″W | Bawn | 1622 | A three-story-tall tower house and bawn built by Roland Savage, a Norman landlord, on the site of a 9th-century tower in 1622 (thus predating the Plantation). The tower was occupied until it was abandoned and left to decay until its purchase and Gothic renovation by a "Colonel Johnston" and some further modification still in 1836 by a "Montgomery of Grey Abbey." It was abandoned once again in 1831, but was opened to the public once more in 2001 by the Northern Ireland Environment Agency. |
| Mahee Castle | | Strangford Lough 54°30′3.6″N 5°38′52.8″W | Tower house | 1570 | Is a ruined tower house near Nendrum Monastery on Mahee Isle by an English soldier named Captain Thomas Browne. Later, it fell into ruin after being abandoned in the early 17th century until its partial renovation in 1923 by a H.C. Lawlor and the Belfast Natural History and Philosophical Society. |
| Margaret's Castle | | Ardglass 54°15′30.24″N 5°36′23.04″W | Tower house | 15th century | Margaret's Tower is one of six ruined tower houses built to protect the warehouses that used to stand in Ardglass that possibly stood 3 stories tall and is thought to have been built in the 15th century. |
| Myra Castle | | Strangford 54°22′4.8″N 5°37′19.2″W | | | |
| Narrow Water Castle | | Warrenpoint 54°6′54″N 6°16′58.8″W | Bawn | 1212; 1560s | A famous bawn constructed some time in the 1560s on the site of an old Norman keep built by the first Earl of Ulster Hugh de Lacy in 1212 in order to impede attacks on the river city of Newry. Narrow Water Castle was also the site of the infamous Warrenpoint ambush on 27 August 1979, wherein the Provisional Irish Republican Army detonated two bombs that killed 18 British army soldiers. |
| Portaferry Castle | | Portaferry 54°22′48″N 5°32′56.4″W | Tower house | 16th century | A small tower house built by William Le Savage in the 16th century overlooking the harbor. It has seen little to no change in its form over the years. |
| Quintin Castle | | Portaferry 54°22′37.2″N 5°29′20.4″W | Castle | 1184 | Quintin castle is one of the very few Anglo-Norman castles still occupied in Ireland. The castle was built in 1184 on the orders of John de Courcy and later occupied by the Savage family, who would add some small additions to the castle. This cycle would continue through the ages all the way to now. |
| Quoile Castle | | Downpatrick 54°20′56.4″N 5°41′56.4″W | Tower house | 16th century | A small tower house located 1.5 miles (2.4 km) from Downpatrick on the east bank of the River Quoile that was inhabited into the late 18th century. |
| Sketrick Castle | | Whiterock 54°29′16.8″N 5°38′52.8″W | Tower house | 12th century | A tower house on Sketrick Island near Whiterock thought to have built in the 12th century that was acquired by Sir Robert Savage in the 14th century. The Annals of the Four Masters record the capture and turning over of the castle in 1470 by an army led by the O'Neills to MacQuillans. It was intact until 1896 when a storm demolished much of it. |
| Stormont Castle | | Stormont Estate 54°36′7.2″N 5°49′48″W | Mansion | Mid 19th century | Stormont, a Scottish baronial mansion built in the mid 19th century, is one of the primary governmental buildings in Northern Ireland. Stormont Castle has been the official residence for those Prime Ministers of Northern Ireland who didn't decide to live in Stormont House and the location of the Cabinet Room of the Government of Northern Ireland from 1921 to 1972. Before devolution it was the Belfast headquarters of the Secretary of State for Northern Ireland, Northern Ireland Office Ministers and their supporting officials. During the Troubles, it was also used as a base by MI5 officers. |
| Strangford Castle | | Strangford 54°22′19.2″N 5°33′18″W | Tower house | 15-16th centuries | An intact tower house built on a hill overlooking the town of Strangford. Although almost all of the castle corresponds with 16th-century Irish architecture, the tower house's door seems to indicate that the current incarnation of the tower is simply a remodeling of an earlier 15th-century tower house. Strangford was once used as a set for Winterhold in the popular HBO TV series, Game of Thrones. |
| Walshestown Castle | | Strangford 54°22′22.8″N 5°37′22.8″W | Tower house | | |
| Castle Ward | | Strangford 54°22′22.8″N 5°34′44.4″W | Tower house | 1760s | An 18th-century National Trust property located 1.5 miles (2.4 km) from the village of Strangford that overlooks the Strangford Lough. The castle has been the home of the Ward family since about 1570, though the modern structure was built for Bernard Ward by an unknown architect, possibly and individual with ties to the Wards or James Bridges. On 10 February 1973, Leonard O'Hanlon (aged 23) and Vivienne Fitzsimmons (aged 17), both members of the Provisional Irish Republican Army, were killed in a premature bomb explosion in the grounds of Castle Ward estate. |

=== County Fermanagh ===
| Name | Image | Location | Type | Date | Notes |
|---|---|---|---|---|---|
| Castle Archdale | | Irvinestown 54°29′13.2″N 7°42′43.2″W | Bawn | 1615 | John Archdale built the tower house and bawn in 1615 during the Plantation of Ulster. During the Irish Rebellion of 1641, it was destroyed by Rory Maguire but subsequently rebuilt. In the Irish campaign of the Nine Years' War, Archdale Castle was destroyed again in 1689. A mansion, also known as Castle Archdale, was built on the estate in 1778, though this was also demolished. Of the final mansion built on this grounds, only the cobblestone courtyard remains because said mansion collapsed in 1883. During World War II, Castle Archdale was an RAF airbase. The ruins are today within a country park. |
| Belle Isle Castle | | Lisbellaw 54°16′1.2″N 7°33′21.6″W | Country house | 1700 | Belle Isle Castle is in truth a large estate spread across eight islands that has been inhabited since the 12th century. Though the castle has been privately owned for nearly its entire history by generations of nobles such as Ralph Gore, 1st Earl of Ross, it has been open to the public since 1760, when the castle began hosting ceremonies, primarily marriages. Belle Isle was built by the aforementioned Ralph Gore around 1700 after his father, Paul Gore, acquired ownership of the islands and has seen much expansion since. Today, the Duke of Abercorn owns and operates the castle as a venue and accommodation and has been declared a Special Area of Conservation. |
| Castle Balfour | | Lisnaskea 54°15′3.6″N 7°26′42″W | Castle | c. 1620 | Although Castle Balfour is a ruin, it is one of the best preserved of Plantation era castles. Castle Balfour (also known as Castle Skeagh) was erected around 1619 by Lord Michael Balfour when the land was granted to him by King James I. The castle was altered in 1652 and damaged in 1689. The last person to possess and inhabit the Castle was James Haire who leased the castle from Earl Erne. The Haire family ceased to live in the castle when it was razed by an unknown arsonist. Major conservation and restoration was undertaken in the 1960s and further conservation work was completed in the late 1990s. Recent Radiocarbon on a ringfort that belonged to the Macguires (the primary suspects in the above arson) on the grounds of the castle date back to 359–428 AD. |
| Castle Caldwell | | Belleek 54°29′27.6″N 7°58′26.4″W | Bawn | 1612–1619 | Francis Blennerhassett built a tower house and bawn before 1620, which was sold to Enniskillen merchant James Caldwell in 1660. In the 1780s it was extensively remodeled and enlarged to form a country house in the Gothic style. It was abandoned in the late 19th century, and in 1913 the Forest Service purchased the estate. Today, the ruins remain standing within the forest. |
| Castle Coole | | Enniskillen 54°20′9.6″N 7°36′10.8″W | Country house | 1798 | A mansion built on the site of a 17th-century bawn named after a nearby lake, Lough Coole. Earlier structures in the area include a ráth and a crannog on the lake. Today's Castle Coole was constructed sometime from 1789 and 1798 as the summer retreat of Armar Lowry-Corry, 1st Earl of Belmore and as a showpiece by architect James Wyatt. Additionally, several smaller family residences had been built on the Castle Coole estate preceding the mansion, including a dwelling of the King James period (later deliberately destroyed by arson) and a Queen Anne style house built in 1709. The house is now managed by the National Trust and is open to the public. |
| Crevenish Castle | | Kesh 54°30′39.6″N 7°44′42″W | Bawn | c. 1618 | Crevenish Castle is a ruined bawn located 3 miles (4.8 km) southwest of the village of Kesh. The bawn was built by a Norfolk man named Thomas Blennerhassett (whose brother built Caldwell Castle), a former captain at Cornet Castle on the Isle of Guernsey, between 1611 and 1622. The castle fell into the hands of the local Macguires when Thomas's eldest son died and his wife wed Rory O'Moore, leader of the Irish Rebellion of 1641, but returned the castle to the Blennerhassetts when Rory was killed in 1648. The castle was reported as being in "ruinous" condition by 1697. Around a third of the structure still stands in a private caravan park. |
| Crom Castle | | Newtownbutler 54°10′4.8″N 7°26′52.8″W | Country house | 1838 | Crom Castle is a 19th-century Victorian style castle situated on the coast of the Upper Lough Erne. The castle was commissioned by John Crichton, 3rd Earl Erne in 1831, and designed and executed by architect Edward Blore (who was responsible for sections of Buckingham Palace) in the baronial and Neo-Tudor styles. The mansion was completed seven years later, only to burn down three years later. Since its complete reconstruction, it has remained the home of the Earl of Erne. |
| Old Crom Castle | | Newtownbutler 54°9′43.2″N 7°26′38.4″W | Plantation castle and bawn | 1611 | Like a lot of Irish country houses in the 17th century, an English lord, in this case Michael Balfour, was granted this lake-shore estate in 1611 during the Plantation of Ulster. The estate would pass into the keeping of the Crichton family in 1655, which by then included Balfour's bawn, which went on to survive two sieges in the Williamite War before being destroyed in a fire in 1746. It was remodelled as a romantic garden in the 19th century, after the 'new' Crom Castle was built. The old castle and parks are now owned by the National Trust. |
| Enniskillen Castle | | Enniskillen 54°20′45.6″N 7°38′38.4″W | Tower house, later a barracks | 15th century | The castle keep was established on a strategic site in the early 15th century by Hugh the Hospitable of the Maguire family. It was attacked by the O'Donnells and O'Neills in the 16th century, and taken for the British crown in 1594. Although recaptured by the Maguires, they destroyed most of the castle in 1602 to deny it to the British. During the Plantation of Ulster Sir William Cole was appointed constable of Enniskillen, charged with rebuilding the castle. From 1607 he rebuilt the tower and constructed the Water Gate. The castle was besieged by the Irish in 1641. The site was extensively rebuilt as a barracks in the later 18th century, and was occupied by the army until 1950. It is now in state care and has been open to the public since 1964 and currently houses the County Museum. |
| Monea Castle | | Monea 54°23′34.8″N 7°44′52.8″W | Bawn | 1618 | The Scots-influenced tower house was built by Malcolm Hamilton, who added the bawn in the 1620s. It was besieged and captured during the Irish Rebellion of 1641. After 1688 it was the residence of Gustavus Hamilton, Governor of Enniskillen, but was abandoned following a fire in the 18th century. The ruins are in state care and open to the public. |
| Necarne Castle | | Irvinestown 54°27′50.4″N 7°38′6″W | Country house | 1615 | A tower house and bawn were built by a man named Gerald Lowther in the Plantation period. The lands passed to the Irvine family later in the 17th century, and in 1833 the castle was rebuilt with a new Tudor-Gothic south wing. It has been empty since being used as a military hospital in the Second World War. |
| Portora Castle | | Enniskillen 54°21′18″N 7°39′39.6″W | Bawn | 1613 | A tower house and bawn built by Sir William Cole, it was let to James Spottiswood, Bishop of Clogher, in the 1620s, and was besieged in 1641 and 1688. The tower was occupied by the Coles until 1764, after which it decayed. It was partly destroyed in an explosion in 1859, and further collapsed during gales in the late 19th century. |
| Tully Castle | | Blaney 54°27′21.6″N 7°48′21.6″W | Bawn | 1612–1615 | Built for Sir John Hume, Tully Castle comprised a tower house within a courtyard, which had square towers at each corner. The house was burned down by Rory Maguire during the Irish Rebellion of 1641, and was not subsequently reoccupied. A 17th-century garden has been recreated in the courtyard. |

=== County Londonderry ===
| Name | Image | Location | Type | Date | Notes |
|---|---|---|---|---|---|
| Bellaghy Castle | | Bellaghy 54°48′28.8″N 6°31′8.4″W | Bawn | 1619 | A bawn that became a fortified house built during the Plantation of Ulster on the site of an old ringfort in 1619. |
| Coleraine Castle | | Coleraine 55°7′55.2″N 6°40′37.2″W | Motte and bailey | 1248 | Norman-era castle, built on the site of a monastery and replaced with an 18th-century manor house. |
| Dungiven Castle | | Dungiven 54°55′30″N 6°55′15.6″W | Country house | 1839 | An earlier house was built on this site in the late 17th century. This was replaced by Robert Ogilby who constructed the present Gothic-revival castle in the 1830s, although it remained incomplete on his death in 1839. It was later converted into flats and then bought by the local authority, who proposed demolition in the 1980s. It has since been restored and is now a hotel. |
| Limavady Castle | | Limavady 55°1′26.4″N 6°56′16.8″W | Tower house | 15th century | A stronghold of the O'Cahans, the tower house by the River Roe may have been built here in the late 15th century. A siege by the MacQuillans is recorded in 1542 wherein all defenders were killed. The castle was demolished in the 1820s. |
| Low Rock Castle | | Portstewart 55°10′40.8″N 6°43′26.4″W | Country house | 1820 | A late Georgian style castellated villa, once the home of Field Marshal Sir George White (1835–1912). It was demolished in 2001. |

=== County Tyrone ===
| Name | Image | Location | Type | Date | Notes |
|---|---|---|---|---|---|
| Altinaghree Castle | | Donemana 54°52′48″N 7°14′45.6″W | Mansion | 1860 | A derelict castle outside of Donemama, County Tyrone alleged to have been built by William Ogilby in 1860. William's son James fell in love with a factory seamstress, Mary Jane Jamieson, whom he ended up eloping with and marrying in 1884. The castle was abandoned by the end of the century and fell into disrepair. |
| Augher Castle | | Augher 54°25′44.4″N 7°8′9.6″W | Country house | 1615 | A typical, 30 feet (9.1 m) tall Plantation era castle built by Lord Ridgeway in 1615 on the site of an older fortification that was later razed in 1689 by Jacobite forces during the Siege of Derry. The castle was rebuilt and then graced by an adjoining mansion by architect Sir J. M. Richardson Bunbury, Bart in 1832 and used by the Richardson-Bunbury baronets as their seat. |
| Benburb Castle | | Benburb 54°24′28.8″N 6°44′42″W | Bawn | 1611 | An irregular four sided Plantation era bawn built in 1611 by Sir Richard Wingfield on a limestone cliff overlooking the River Blackwater, the border of Counties Tyrone and Armagh. As Wingfield had no desire to live at Benburb Castle, the castle was no main residential structure making it something of a defensive structure resembling a keep rather than a residence such as a bawn. 30 years after its completion, the castle was taken by Phelim O'Neill and everyone in the castle was slain. Although the castle was dismantled in 1640, it was restored and is today used as a priory and conference center by the Servite Order. |
| Castlederg Castle, or Derg Castle | | Castlederg 54°42′21.6″N 7°35′52.8″W | Bawn | 1610 | The ruins of a rectangular Plantation era bawn built on the ruins of earlier O'Neill tower house located on the north shore of the River Derg. The exact date of the castle's construction is unknown, but it was first mentioned in 1497 by the Annals of the Four Masters. What is known, however, is that the castle was rebuilt in 1610 by Sir John Davies, who settled his purchased plot of land with 16 families brought over from England and also founded the town of Castlederg. Phelim O'Neill, in his 1641 Rebellion, besieged Castleerg and took it in his ultimately unsuccessful attempt to drive the newcomers from Ulster, and the castle was dismantled. After the besieging and surrender of the castle to King James II's forces during the Williamite Wars in Ireland, the castle fell into disuse and ruin. |
| Caulfield Castle | | Castlecaulfield 54°30′21.6″N 6°50′6″W | Fortified house | 1614 | Castle Caulfield is a ruined Plantation era fortified house built by Sir Toby Caulfield upon the ruins of an older O'Donnelly castle (dendrochronology of a joist present in the structure date back to 1282). The second Lord Charlemont added a keep or donjon, and a large gatehouse with towers to the castle. The castle was burned down in the Irish Rebellion of 1641 by Patrick Donnelly, was rebuilt and occupied by the Caulfields again in the 1660s, only for the castle to fall into ruin again around 1700. Today, the castle is a State Care Historic Monument. |
| Dungannon Castle | | Dungannon 54°30′0″N 6°46′12″W | Ruin | 1305 | Since 1305, the ancestral castle of the O'Neill dynasty stood on this hill outside of Dungannon. However, that castle was razed in 1602 by Hugh O'Neill to prevent the capture of the town and castle by the English. When the Plantation of Ulster began, the land the castle stood on was granted to Sir Arthur Chichester, who rebuilt it. In the again O'Neill led Irish Rebellion of 1641, the castle was undermined and seized by Felim O'Neill, where he and his rebels declared their loyalty to Charles I. |
| Harry Avery's Castle | | Newtownstewart 54°42′46.8″N 7°23′34.8″W | Castle | c. 1320 | A rare example of a Gaelic castle left in Northern Ireland that is thought to have been built in 1320 by a local O'Neill chieftain named Henry Aimhréidh O'Neill, or Harry Avery O'Neill. Despite that, it seems to have been a site of low importance to the local Gaelic people. The castle was seized by the English in 1609 and used as a quarry. Today, the castle's ruins are a State Care Monument under the guardianship of the Northern Ireland Environment Agency. |
| Killymoon Castle | | Cookstown 54°38′6″N 6°44′9.6″W | Country house | 1803 | Two castles have stood on this site. The first was a castle built in 1761 by James Stewart, which burned down in 1801. The second and notably larger structure is the castle built by Col. William Stewart in the Neo-Gothic style circa 1803 according to a design by architect John Nash. Today, the castle estate is home to a modest, 18-hole golf course. |
| Mountjoy Castle | | Brockagh 54°33′32.4″N 6°36′28.8″W | Bawn | 1602 | Mountjoy Castle was a campaign fort built with red bricks by Lord Mountjoy in 1602 upon the ruins of an O'Neill fortress named "Fuath na nGall" (Irish: Hatred of Foreigners). During the Rebellion of 1641, the castle was taken by Turlough O'Neill and used as his personal fortress until his total defeat two years later. In 1648, the castle was dismantled on the orders of Parliament and was left in ruin. The castle is today a State Care Historic Monument and freely accessible to the public. |
| Roughan Castle | | Newmills 54°34′22.8″N 6°45′7.2″W | Bawn | 1618 | A State Care Historic Monument located near Newmills, Northern Ireland. Roughan Castle is a Plantation era bawn built by Sir Andrew Stewart, the Second Lord Castlestewart. During the Rebellion of 1641, the castle's current lord, Robert Stewart, was appointed a commander in the Rebel armies by Phelim O'Neill and he was captured here and brought to Dublin to be executed. |
| Roxborough Castle | | Moy 54°26′49.2″N 6°41′31.2″W | Country house | 1738 | The castle, originally built in 1738 as the seat of the Earl of Charlemont, was remodeled by architect William Murray in the Italianate style in 1842 for the second Viscount of Charlemont. Further remodeling later by the Second Viscount's resulted in a house that resembled a French château. The castle was again renovated in 1864 by the Third Viscount before the castle was razed to the ground by the Irish Republican Army in 1922. |
| Stewart Castle | | Newtownstewart 54°43′8.4″N 7°22′30″W | Bawn | 1619 | A Plantation era English manor built in 1619 by Sir Robert Newcomen following the Flight of the Earls. The castle was razed twice - first during the Rebellion of 1641 by Sir Felim O'Neill, and again in 1689 by King James II along with its town as he returned from the Siege of Derry. Today, the monument is a State Care Historic Monument. Also present on the site is an intact Bronze Age cist that was excavated in 1999. |

== See also ==
- Abbeys, priories and historic houses
  - List of monastic houses in Ireland
  - List of country houses in the United Kingdom
  - List of historic houses in the Republic of Ireland
  - List of country houses in the United Kingdom
- Castles
  - Castles in Great Britain and Ireland
  - Castles in Scotland
  - List of castles in Wales
- History of Ireland
- List of country estates in Northern Ireland
- List of monastic houses in Ireland

== Notes ==
=== References ===
- Bence-Jones, Mark (1988). A Guide to Irish County Houses. London: Constable. ISBN 0-09-469990-9.
- Department of the Environment for Northern Ireland (1983). Historic Monuments of Northern Ireland. Belfast: HMSO.
- Flanagan, Laurence (1992). A Dictionary of Irish Archaeology. Dublin: Gill and Macmillan.
- Harbinson, Peter (1992). Guide to National and Historic Monuments of Ireland. Dublin: Gill & Macmillan. ISBN 0717119564.
- Hill, Niki (1997). The Mournes. Dundurn. ISBN 9781900935043.
- Hughes, Lindsey (1990). Sophia, Regent of Russia, 1657-1704. New Haven, CT: Yale University Press. ISBN 0300047908.
- Lynch, Christopher (1977). "Bunratty Castle - a short history" (PDF). The Other Clare. 1. Archived from the original (PDF) on 30 December 2020.
- Maguire, W. A. (2000). A century in focus: photography and photographers in the North of Ireland, 1839-1939. Blackstaff. ISBN 9780856406799.
- McCusker, Breege (30 June 1999). Fermanagh: Land of Lake and Legend. Dundurn. ISBN 1900935104.
- Moody, T.W. (1547). A New History of Ireland. 8: A Chronology of Irish History. Oxford University: Oxford University Press. ISBN 978-0-19-821744-2.
- O'Neill, B. (2002). Irish Castles and Historic Houses. London: Caxton Editions.
- Sandford, Ernest (1976). Discover Northern Ireland. Belfast: Northern Ireland Tourist Board. ISBN 0-9500222-7-6.
- Stout, Matthew (1997). The Irish Ringfort. Dublin, Ireland: Four Courts Press. ISBN 1-85182-300-X.
- Westropp, T. J. (1899). "Notes on the Lesser Castles or "Peel Towers" of the County Clare" (PDF). Proceedings of the Royal Academy. 3rd. 5 (3): 348–viii. JSTOR 20490552.
- McCavitt, John (2005). The Flight of the Earls. Gill and MacMillan. ISBN 0717139360.
