= List of country estates in Northern Ireland =

The following is a partial list of country estates in Northern Ireland:

== County Antrim ==
- Glenarm Castle Estate
- Shane's Castle Estate
- Lissanoure Castle Estate

== County Armagh ==
- Gosford Castle
- Drumbanagher House

== County Down ==
- Narrow Water Castle
- Clandeboye Estate
- Dundrum Castle
- Greencastle
- Jordan's Castle
- Kilclief Castle
- Killyleagh Castle
- Kirkistown Castle
- Hillsborough Castle
- Margaret's Castle
- Mount Stewart
- Quintin Castle
- Quoile Castle
- Sketrick Castle
- Strangford Castle
- Walshestown Castle
- Portavo House
- Seaforde

== County Fermanagh ==
- Castle Coole
- Castle Balfour
- Crom Castle
- Knockninny Castle
- Monea Castle
- Necarne Castle
- Belle Isle Castle
- Tully Castle

== County Londonderry ==
- Drenagh Estate
- Dawson Castle
- Lakeside Estate
- Boom Hall

== County Tyrone ==
- Baronscourt Estate
- Benburb Castle
- Castle Caulfield
- Harry Avery's Castle
- Killymoon Castle
- Mountjoy Castle
- Roughan Castle
- Stewart Castle

== See also ==
- List of castles in Northern Ireland
- List of castles in the Republic of Ireland
- List of castles
- Abbeys and priories in Northern Ireland
- Abbeys and priories in the Republic of Ireland
