= Rattin =

Rattin may refer to:

- Antonio Rattín (1937–2026), Argentine footballer and politician
- Die Rättin, 1986 novel by Günter Grass
- Rattin, a townland of County Westmeath, Ireland
  - Rattin Castle

== See also ==
- Ratin, a village in Romania
