= Portaferry Castle =

Tower house on the Ards Peninsula, Northern Ireland

Coordinates: 54.380°N 5.549°W

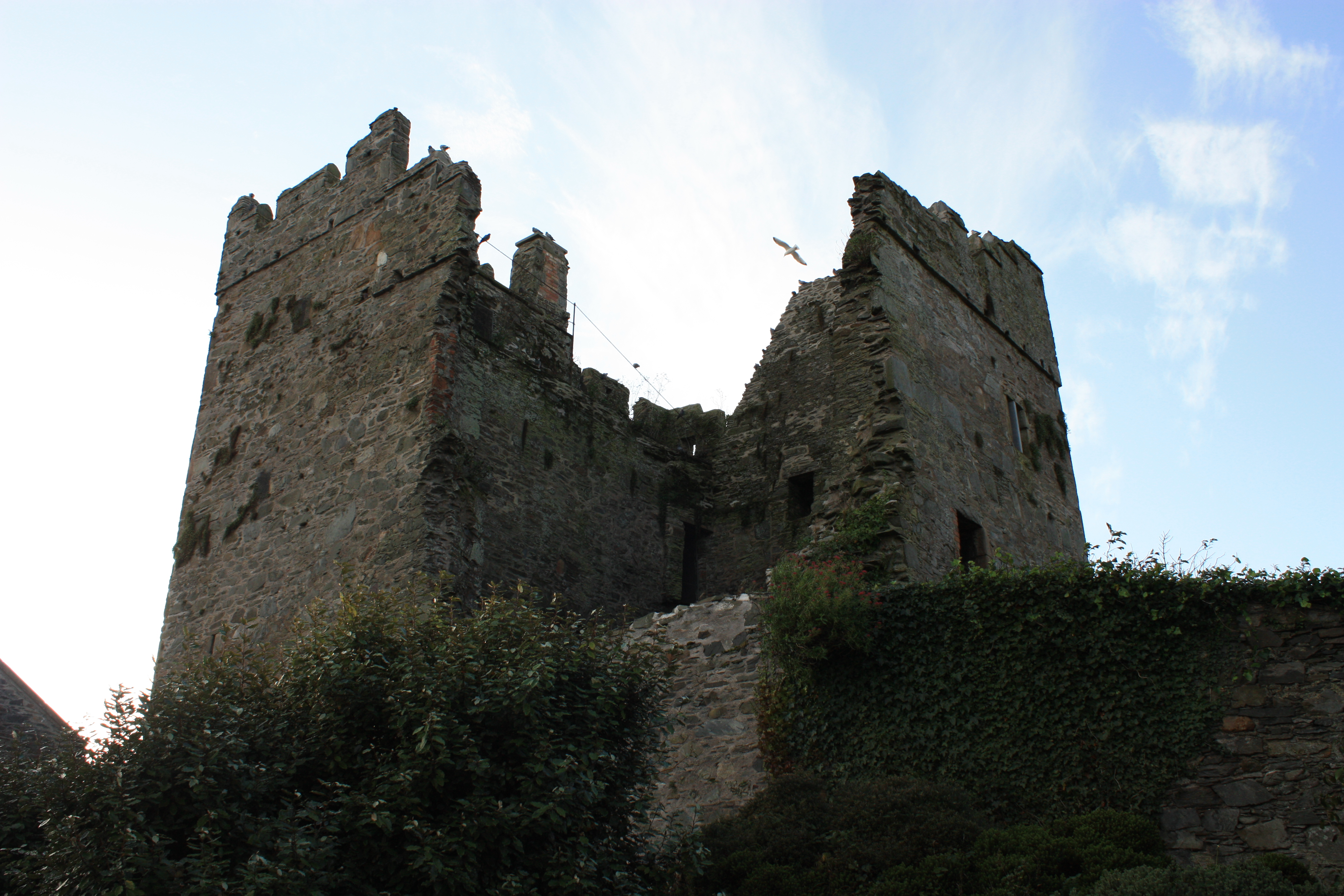
Portaferry Castle, October 2009

Portaferry Castle is a small tower house in Portaferry, County Down, Northern Ireland, overlooking the harbour. It was built in the 16th century by William Le Savage. Portaferry Castle tower house is a State Care Historic Monument in the townland of Ballyphilip, in Borough of Ards, at grid ref: J5930 5085.

== History ==
The castle was probably built in the 16th century by a member of the Savage family. In 1635, Patrick Savage's brother-in-law, Sir James Montgomery of Rosemount (Greyabbey), repaired the castle by roofing and flooring it so that his sister could live in greater comfort there.

== Features ==
It is a square building with a small projecting turret on the south corner. It is three storeys high plus attic and there is no vault. Most of the eastern corner is in ruins. The entrance at the base of the tower is protected by a small machicolation and the entrance to the ground floor chamber is protected by a murder-hole. A curved stairway within the tower rises to the first floor and a spiral stairway in the west corner continues to roof level.

== See also ==
- Castles in Northern Ireland
