= Creevekeeran Castle =

Ruined castle in County Armagh, Northern Ireland

Coordinates: 54.276629°N 6.796069°W

Creevekeeran Castle is a castle in County Armagh, Northern Ireland. It stands on a rocky outcrop but only the west wall, three stories high, remains. The castle is a Scheduled Historic Monument sited in the townland of Creevekeeran, in the Armagh City, Banbridge and Craigavon Borough Council area, at grid ref: H7847 3710.

== See also ==
- List of castles in Northern Ireland
