= Ballymarkahan Castle =

Ruined tower house, County Clare, Ireland

- County Clare, Ireland
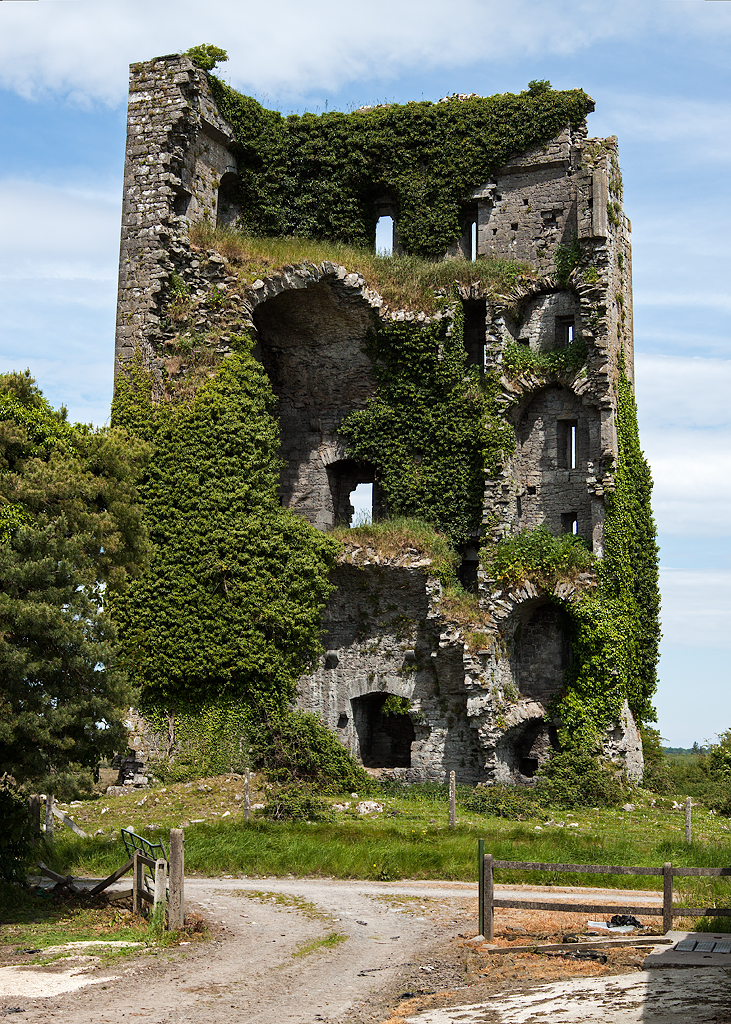
- Ballymarkahan Castle, seen from the south

Location
- Coordinates: 52.803867°N 8.836839°W

Site history
- Built: 15th century
- Built by: MacNamara family

Ballymarkahan Castle is a ruined tower house in the parish of Quin, in County Clare, Ireland. It was listed by Irish antiquarian T. J. Westropp as one of the 195 "lesser castles", or peel towers, of County Clare in 1899, by which time it was already a ruin. It was mentioned as a ruin in the Ordnance Survey Letters of John O'Donovan and Eugene O'Curry in 1839. It is marked on the Ordnance Survey map of 1842. The castle dates from the fifteenth century, some time after the construction of Quin Abbey, and was built by the MacNamara family, who built a number of castles in the area, including nearby Knappogue Castle. According to Westropp, it was built in 1430 by "Donall, son of Shane an Gabhaltais."
