= Crooke Preceptory =

Ruined church in County Waterford, Ireland

Coordinates: 52.228°N 6.980°W

Crooke Preceptory is a ruined church, traditionally associated with the Knights Templar and the Knights Hospitaller, in County Waterford, Ireland. It is located in the townland of Crooke and the present day parish of Killea Crooke and Faithlegg. The church is associated with the nearby 13th-century Crook Castle tower house.

== History ==
Crooke Preceptory was founded sometime before 1180. Together with nearby Crooke Castle, the site passed to the Knights Hospitallers of Killure in 1327. It was seized at the time of the suppression of the monasteries in 1541, and its possessions were reduced to 120 acres. It is thought to have become a parish church of Crooke, with records describing the church as being "in good repair" as of 1613.

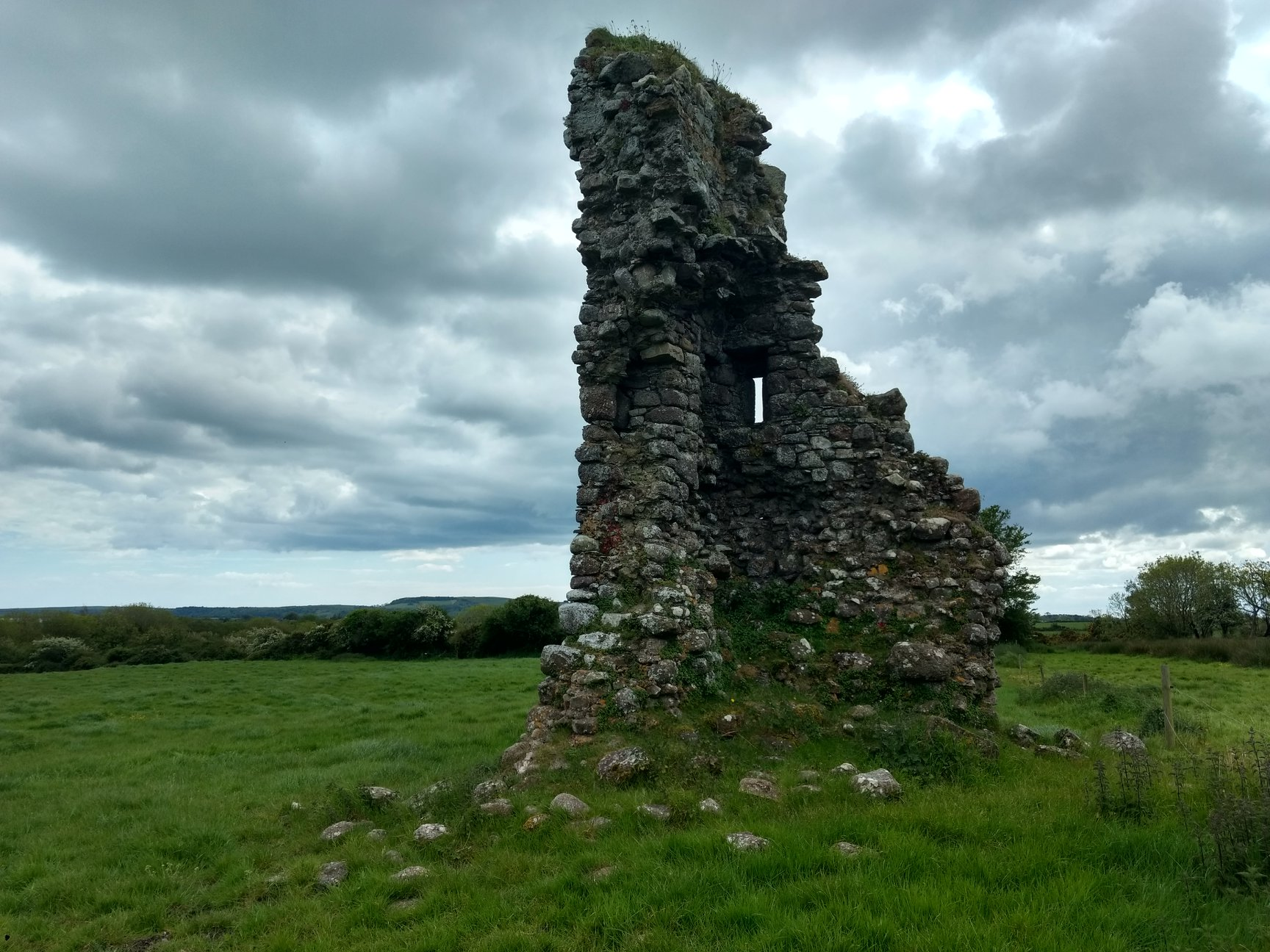
The remains of Crooke Castle lie approximately 50 metres (160 ft) south of Crooke Preceptory's church

== Structures ==
The ruin of the Crooke Preceptory church is situated within a graveyard and is described by the Archaeological Inventory of County Waterford (1999) as measuring 24.6 metres (81 ft) in length and 6.75 metres (22.1 ft) in width. Structural remains include three lancet windows on the church gable, evidence of a window in the southern chancel wall, and a doorway in the southern nave wall with an adjacent stoup.

At the time of the 1841 Ordnance Survey of Ireland, the south and west walls stood to a height of approximately 26 feet (7.9 m), though the north and east sides had already been reduced to their foundations. The exterior footprint was recorded as 43 feet 4 inches (13.21 m) by 31 feet (9.4 m), with walls 7 feet 6 inches (2.29 m) thick. The masonry consisted of large, grouted blocks of grit stone laid in regular courses, featuring prominent, chiselled quoin stones. Interior features included an internal staircase built into the thickness of the east and south walls and a stone arch that once supported the second floor. The mortar was notably hard and contained broken shells, while the windows were quadrangular and framed in a mix of cut limestone and grit.

The church is surrounded by cut-stone walls characterised as 16th or 17th-century in style. Located less than 50 metres (160 ft) to the south is the ruined tower house known as Crooke Castle. Built to a rectangular plan with a reputed height of 8 metres (26 ft), the castle survives only as two walls and the remains of a destroyed staircase. While mid-19th century records indicated that a barrel vault was then partially extant, only fragments remain today. A holy well site is also located near the castle.
