= Ballylough Castle =

Castle in County Antrim, Northern Ireland

Ballylough Castle is a ruined castle in County Antrim, Northern Ireland, that was a stronghold of the MacQuillans and the MacDonnells in former times.

== Geography ==
Historically, it was situated in the parish of Billy. The area was divided into the townlands of Ballylough, Ballyloughmore and Ballyloughbeg. An 1847 publication described Ballylough as "a townland in that part of the parish which is in the barony of Dunluce Lower, now subdivided into Ballylough, Ballyloughmore, and Ballyloughbeg." Part of the old structure is still visible in the rear of Ballylough House, but the lake (lough) has disappeared. The Giant's Causeway is located nearby. At the Belfast Field Naturalists' Club of 1882, there was a discussion of a recent review of a crannóg at Ballylough.

== Castle ==
Ballylough Castle was once a stronghold of the MacQuillans and the MacDonnells. This castleis mentioned by the Four Masters in 1544, as Baile-an-locha. The castle was taken by the O'Donnells, who took arms, armour, brass, iron, butter, and provisions. In 1624, the Earl of Antrim reportedly "granted the 120 acres of Ballylough with the 120 acres of Ballintoy to Archibald Stewart and in 1625 the Earl granted 100 acres at Ballylough Beg to Walter Kennedy". Two chests from a Spanish ship of the Armada were kept by the Antrim family at Ballylough before being moving to Glenarm castle around 1740.
