= Grange Castle =

Grange Castle Irish: Caisleán na Gráinsí
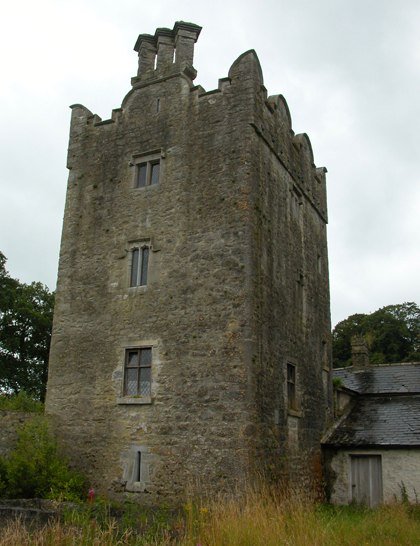
- Western facade

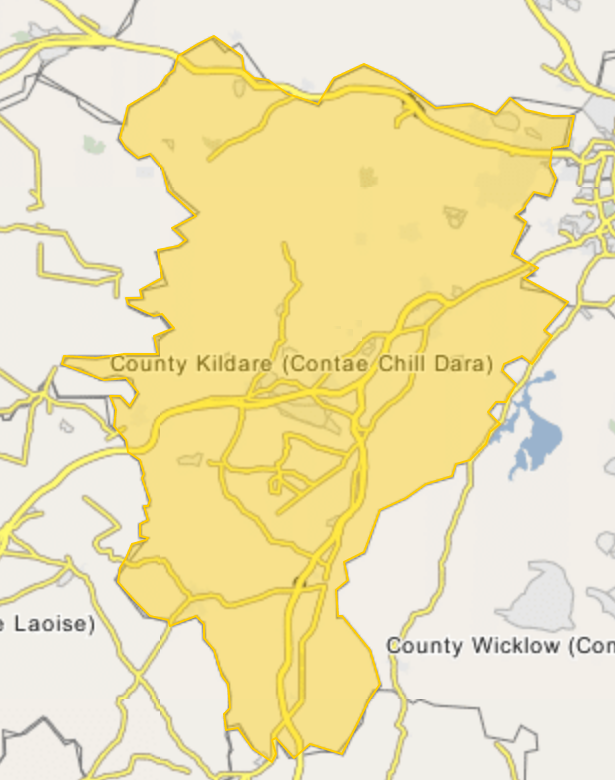
- Location within County Kildare
- 53.375118°N 7.068169°W
- Type: Irish tower house
- Location: Grange West, Carrick, Carbury, County Kildare, Ireland

History
- Built: c. 1460

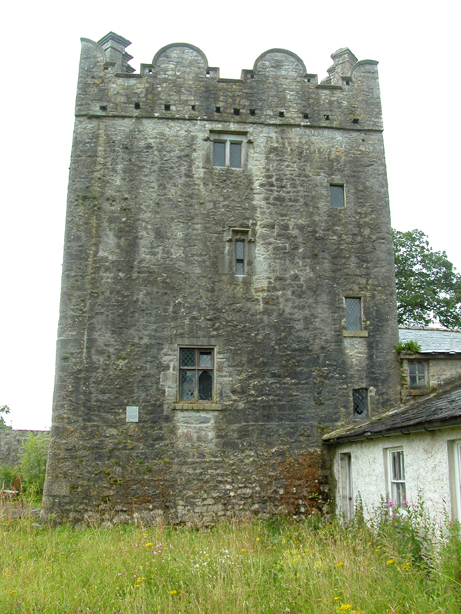
Grange castle, side view

Grange Castle, Irish: Caisleán na Gráinsí, is a tower house in Grange West, County Kildare, Ireland. It is an Irish National Monument.
