= Harry Avery's Castle =

Ruined castle in County Tyrone, Northern Ireland

Coordinates: 54.713°N 7.393°W

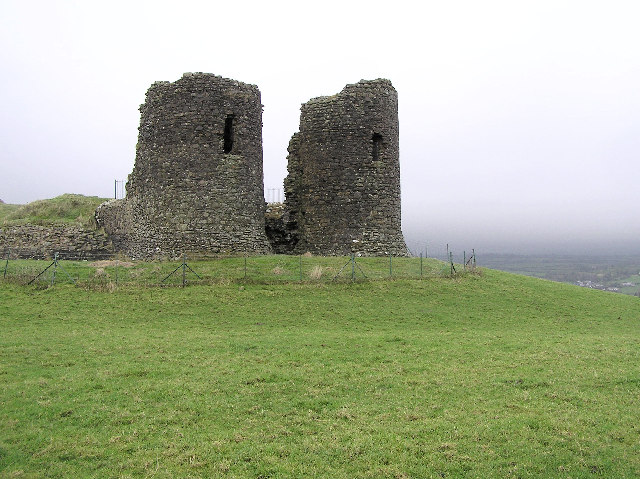
Harry Avery's Castle

Harry Avery's Castle is situated half a mile south-west of Newtownstewart, in County Tyrone, Northern Ireland. It is a rare example of a stone castle built by a Gaelic Irish chief, although its origins and history are uncertain. It is associated with and named after Henry Aimhréidh O'Neill (died 1392), whose name was anglicised as Harry Avery.

== Description ==
The standing part of the castle comprises a two-storey rectangular construction fronted by massive D-shaped twin towers. Although having the appearance of a gatehouse, this structure was in fact a simple tower house with the D-towers added to the front. The tower comprised a vaulted basement entered from a large door between the D-towers. Above this was a hall on the first floor level, which was accessed from the courtyard. The southerly D-tower contained a spiral stair linking the two storeys, and both D-towers contained small rooms at first floor, with single windows in their round walls. Traces of a mural stair lead up from the first floor, and there is a latrine chute leading up, suggesting at least a parapet at the second floor. Examination of the structure suggests that it was built in a single phase, rather than being a modification of an older gatehouse.

The design of the castle has been compared to that of Elagh Castle, Inishowen, which also appears to have been a native-built castle featuring D-towers. The inspiration is thought have come from Norman castles such as Carrickfergus Castle and Castle Roche, both of which have true gatehouses flanked by D-towers. The overall design of Harry Avery's Castle is also similar to other Gaelic fortresses such as Seafin, County Down, which were later enclosed by a curtain wall with a tower house.

The Annals of the Four Masters record the death of Harry Avery, "Enrí Aimhreidh mac Neill Móir Uí Néill", on the feast day of St Brendan, 1392, and praise his justice, nobility, and hospitality.

== Status ==
The ruin is in the townland of Upper or New Deer Park, in the Derry and Strabane District Council area, at grid reference H3915 8527. The remains of the castle are a State Care Monument under the guardianship of the Northern Ireland Environment Agency.

== See also ==
- Castles in Northern Ireland
