= Stewart Castle, Northern Ireland =

Ruined castle in County Tyrone, Northern Ireland

Coordinates: 54.719°N 7.375°W

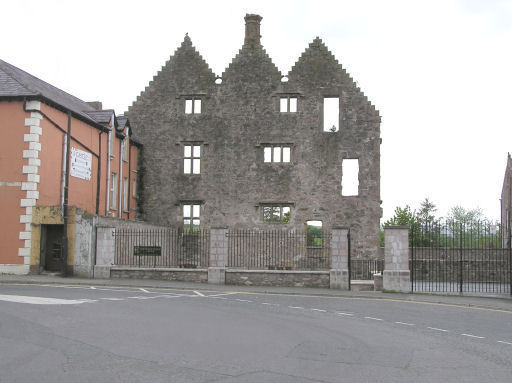
Stewart Castle

Stewart Castle (also known as Newtownstewart Castle) is a ruined castle situated in Newtownstewart, County Tyrone, Northern Ireland. It was built in 1619 by Sir Robert Newcomen in an "English manor house" style. It was damaged during the Irish Rebellion of 1641 by Sir Phelim O' Neill and in 1689 on King James' return from the Siege of Derry. King James ordered the Stewart Castle, and the town, to be burnt down. In the main street a piece of the castle wall still stands. An intact Bronze Age cist grave was found within castle site. It was excavated in 1999.

== History ==
The land around Stewart Castle was originally built upon by Sir Robert Newcomen after the Flight of the Earls in 1615 with it being completed seven years later. Seven years after completion, Newcomen sold the castle to his son-in-law Sir William Stewart who renamed the castle after himself. Stewart had previously fought in Ireland against Cahir O'Doherty, due to him rebelling and his part in the burning of Derry, and was present at the Battle of Kilmacrennan in 1609. During the Irish Rebellion of 1641, Stewart abandoned the castle which was subsequently burned by Sir Phelim O'Neill. No-one claimed ownership of the castle until 1688 when King James II of Ireland stayed the night at the castle on his way to the siege of Derry. Following the failure of the siege, he ordered the castle and surrounding town be destroyed to cover his retreat. In the 19th century, the local townspeople repurposed the area around the castle's remaining single wall as a market square. In 1999, the area around the castle was excavated with a Bronze Age grave being found, leading to suggestions the castle was built upon a Bronze Age burial site.

== Location ==
Newtownstewart, a plantation castle, is a State Care Historic Monument in Strabane District Council area, at grid ref: H4020 8583.

== See also ==
- Castles in Northern Ireland
