= Quintin Castle =

Castle in County Down, Northern Ireland

Coordinates: 54.3768°N 5.4891°W

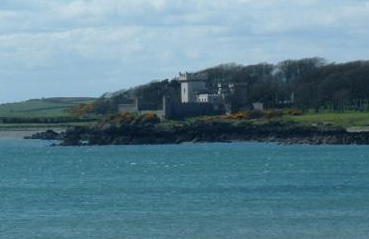
Quintin Castle

Quintin Castle is a castle situated in County Down, Northern Ireland, United Kingdom, about 4 kilometres (2.5 mi) east of Portaferry.

The Montgomerys sold the castle to George Ross, but he never lived in the castle, allowing it to become a near ruin. While he lived in The Mount Ross estate a few miles outside of Portaferry. In the early 19th century the castle was inherited by Elizabeth Calvert (née Blacker), a descendant of Ross, and restored in 1850.

The castle has been extensively refurbished by McGimpsey and Kane Builders, changing hands most recently in late 2006. The latest owner had trouble with upkeep, in particular paying of renovation works, forcing the castle into the hands of administrators in 2012. In June 2013 Quintin Castle was sold (asking £1.65m with 22 acres) by NAMA to the Tayto Group (owned by the Hutchinson family's Manderley Food Group), which in July 2016 applied for permission to use the Castle as an 8-bedroom private function venue for weddings, visiting customers, training and conferences.

== See also ==
- Castles in Northern Ireland
