= Castlepook =

Ruined castle in County Cork, Ireland

Coordinates: 52.25356°N 8.56405°W

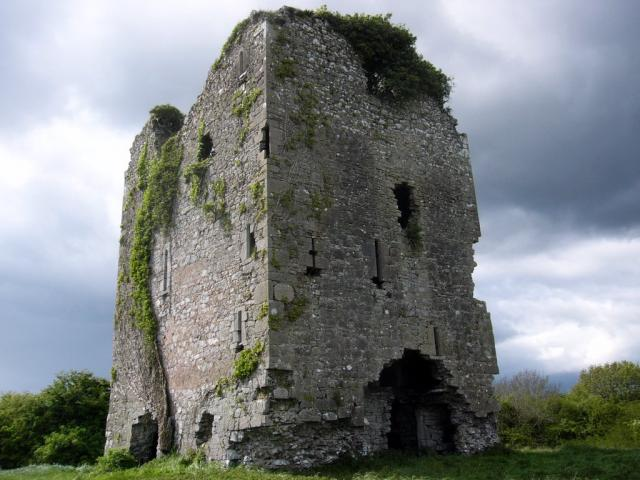
Castlepook

Castlepook or Castle Pook is a Norman style castle built in 1380 by the Synan family. The castle's ruin is 4 km north of Doneraile, in the foothills of the Ballyhoura Mountains in County Cork, Ireland.

Castlepook is made of limestone, with a stone vaulted roof which is still intact. There was once a spiral staircase made of stone in the southwest corner. Much of the smooth stone (such as was used for the stairs and window / door frames) has been removed by vandals.
