= Raphoe Castle =

17th-century castle ruin

Coordinates: 54.8728°N 7.5970°W

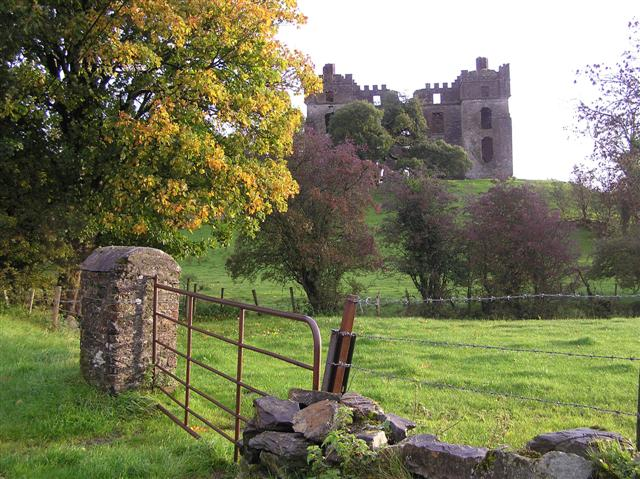
Raphoe Castle

Raphoe Castle, also known as the Bishop's Palace, is a ruined early 17th-century castle on the edge of Raphoe, County Donegal, Ireland. The 'castle' was built in the 1630s for The Rt. Rev. Dr John Leslie, Church of Ireland Lord Bishop of Raphoe, from stone from a ruined round tower. Bishop Leslie was besieged within the castle during the Irish Rebellion of 1641, until he was relieved by the Laggan Army. Leslie was laid siege to again during the Cromwellian conquest of Ireland, with the castle surrendering in 1650.

It was damaged by supporters of King James II & VII in 1689 during the Williamite War. A century later, in 1798, the castle was attacked again, this time by the United Irishmen, three of whom were killed during the Irish Rebellion of 1798.

The castle was destroyed in an accidental fire in 1838.
