= Tellarought Castle =

Tower House near New Ross, County Wexford, Ireland

Coordinates: 52°20′N 6°53′W

Tellarought Castle is a fortified tower house located approximately 11 km (7 mi) south-east of New Ross, County Wexford, Ireland.

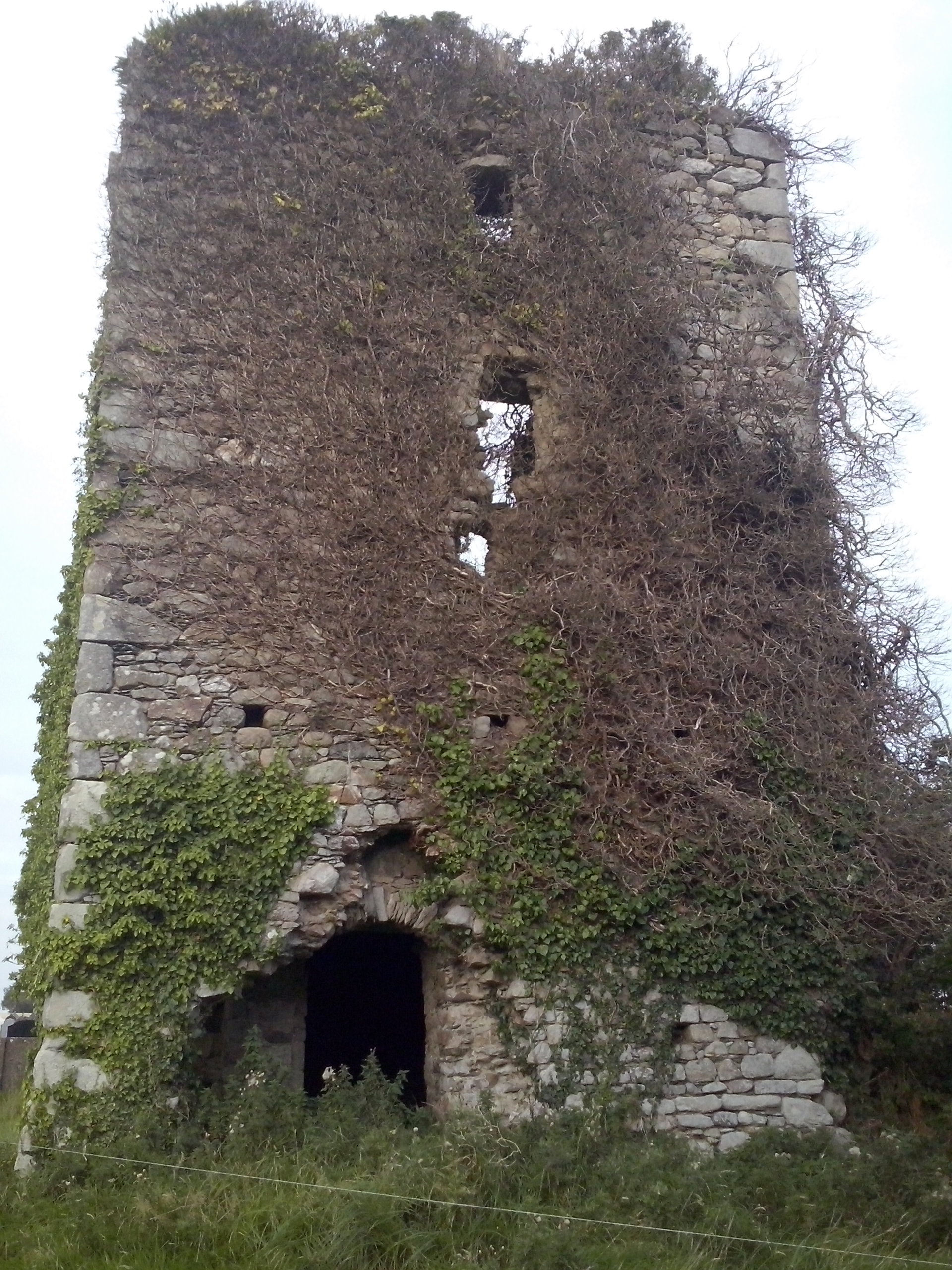
Possibly the main entrance to the castle's tower

== Location ==
The ruin, with four walls still standing but partly overgrown, lies immediately adjacent to the road known as St Brigid's Terrace, off the R734 road, which runs from near New Ross to Tintern Abbey and Fethard. It is in a field just west of the graveyard of St. Brigid's Roman Catholic church, which serves Terrarath (an alternate form of the locale's name) within Cushinstown Parish.

== Building and history ==
The building is a ruined tower house, a lightly fortified dwelling, dating to the Anglo-Norman period. It was held by the Sutton family in 1307, and may have been the property of one William Devoreux of Talleraght who is mentioned as being the recipient of a pardon in 1597 in the Elizabethan Fiants. By 1641 it appears to have been held by a Matthew Forde, though it may have been in disrepair by the Civil Survey of the mid-1650s. As of 1837, the castle was held by a Mr Lambert, and locally held to be of Norman origin.

The tower is located on private agricultural land close to St Brigid's Well, which was believed by some local people to have special healing properties. A small stream also rises on the site and passes the tower house flowing south-east, passing under the road.

In 2019, funding was approved by the Irish National Monuments Service and Wexford County Council to undertake maintenance work on the tower in order to prevent it collapsing into the adjacent road.

== Name ==
Talleraght was an alternative anglicisation of Tellarought's original Irish language name, Tulaigh Reacht.

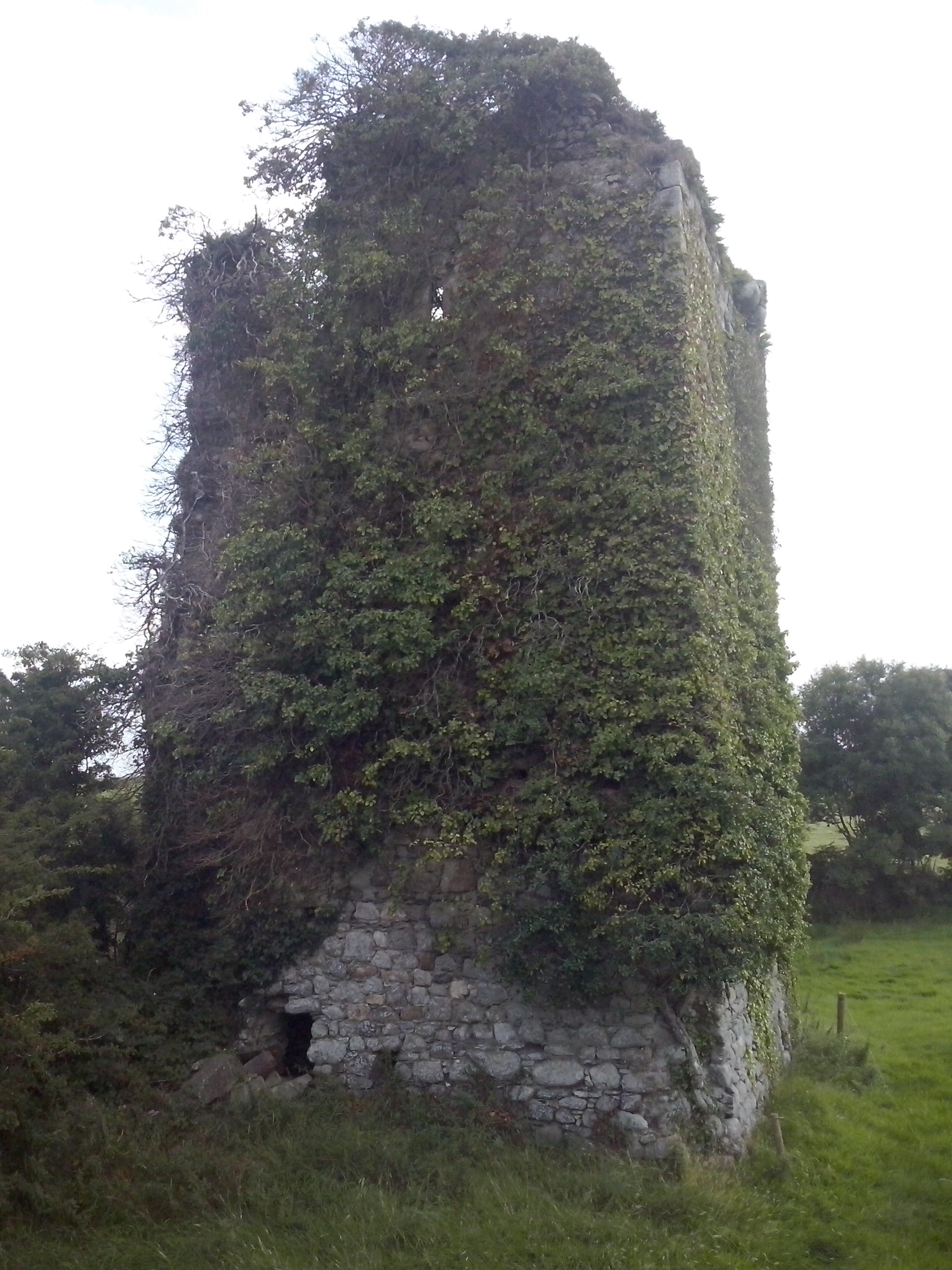
As seen from the bottom of St. Brigid's Churchyard, Tellarought
