= Rattin Castle =

Castle ruin in County Westmeath, Ireland

Coordinates: 53.4437°N 7.1715°W

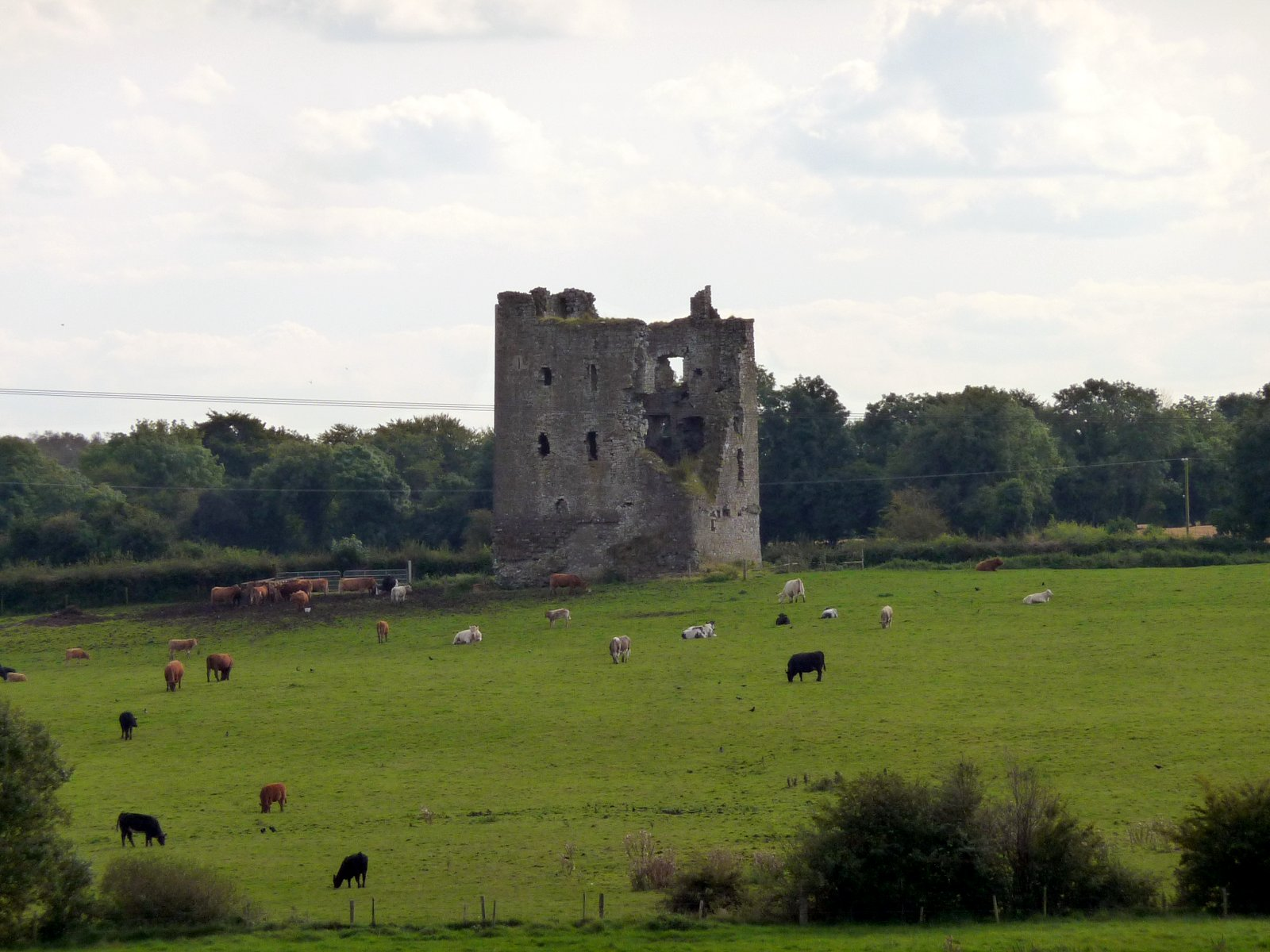
Rattin Castle

Rattin Castle (Irish: Caisleán Raitin) is a ruined castle located southwest of the town of Kinnegad in County Westmeath, Ireland. The castle dates to the 16th century, and was built as a defensive tower for the local lands.

The lands were originally owned by Hugh De Lacy, before he passed it onto John D'Arcy. The castle remained in the family's possession until the Irish Rebellion of 1641, in which it was forfeited.

The M6 Motorway now passes close to the castle ruins - which are still largely intact.
