= Maguire family =

Maguire Mac Uidhir
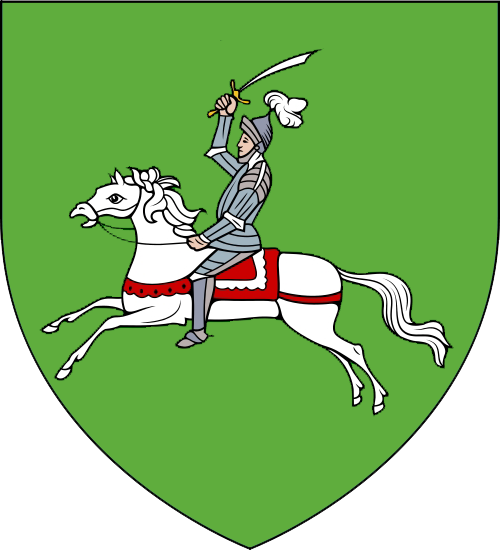
- Parent house: Clan Conla
- Country: Kingdom of Fermanagh
- Founded: 10th century
- Founder: Odhar mac Cearnaigh
- Final ruler: Cú Chonnacht Óg mac Con Connacht Óig Mag Uidhir
- Titles: King of Fermanagh; Baron Maguire
- Cadet branches: McManus; McCaffrey

The Maguire (/məˈɡwaɪər/ mə-GWIRE) family is an Irish clan based in County Fermanagh. The name derives from the Gaelic Mac Uidhir, which is "son of Odhar" meaning 'sallow' or 'pale-faced'. According to legend, this relates to the eleventh descendant of Colla da Chrich, great-grandson of Cormac mac Airt, who was monarch of Ireland about the middle of the third century. From the 13th to the 17th centuries, the Maguire family were kings of Fermanagh.

== Naming conventions ==
The surname has been anglicized variously as McGuire, McGwire, McGwyre and most commonly, Maguire (from variant form Mag Uidhir).

Male	Daughter	Wife	Wife (Short)
Mac Uidhir	Nic Uidhir	Bean Mhic Uidhir	Mhic Uidhir

== History ==
According to historian C. Thomas Cairney, the Maguires were a chiefly family of the Oirghialla (or Airgíalla or Oriel) who were a tribe of the Laigin, the third wave of Celts to settle in Ireland during the first century BC.

The Maguire sept is primarily associated with modern-day County Fermanagh. They possessed the entire county, also known as Maguire's Country, from about 1250 C.E. and maintained their independence as Lords of Fermanagh down to the reign of King James VI & I, when their county was confiscated like other parts of Ulster. The Maguire's supplied Chiefs or Princes to Fermanagh, from about A.D. 1264, when they supplanted the former Chieftains (Ó Daimhín, or Devin/Devine). They were inaugurated as Princes of Fermanagh on the summit of Cuilcagh, a magnificent mountain near Swanlinbar, on the borders of Cavan and Fermanagh; and sometimes also at a place called Sciath Gabhra or Lisnasciath, now Lisnaskea. The family was first mentioned in the Annals as early as 956 AD and have always been closely associated with the other leading septs of Ulster such as the O'Neill and the O'Donnell. They spawned several well-known branches which became septs in their own right, including Mac Manus, Mac Caffrey, Mac Hugh, and several others. The name is among the forty most common names in Ireland, among the top twenty-five in Ulster, ten in County Cavan, thirty in County Monaghan and is the single most common name in County Fermanagh. Maguiresbridge in County Fermanagh (Irish: Droichead Mhig Uidhir) takes its name from the family.

In the Nine Years' War (1594–1603), Hugh Maguire, the Lord of Fermanagh, took the rebels' side, while his subordinate kinsman Connor Roe Maguire of Magherastephana sought to displace him and was nicknamed "the Queen's Maguire" for his support of Queen Elizabeth's forces. Connor was granted the whole of Maguire's Country (Fermanagh) by letters patent in 1601, but this was disregarded by the Plantation of Ulster in 1609, which granted him only twelve thousand acres of the barony of Magherastephana. Connor's son Bryan was made Baron Maguire of Enniskillen in 1627; both of his sons supported the Confederate Ireland rebellion of the 1640s. Connor, 2nd Baron was executed and attainted in 1645, while Rory Maguire was killed in fighting in 1648. Rory's son, Roger Maguire, was a Jacobite politician and soldier. During translation in the Ulster Plantation, various English translations of the original Mag Uidhir appeared, including Maguire, Mac Guire and McGuire. In South West Donegal, the name is re-translated into Gaelic as Mac Guibhir. An unusual version is Meguiar, an American spelling best known from "Meguiar's Wax."

Enniskillen Castle was the medieval seat of the Maguire (Mag Uidhir), chieftains of Fermanagh, who policed the lough with a private navy of 1,500 boats. Nearby is Maguiresbridge. At the castle, the King got wind of a large army that had been sent to attack. Fearing the loss of all his clan, he sent half of his people to the northwest of Scotland, who adopted the surname of MacQuarrie.

The Maguire clan motto is Justitia et fortitudo invincibilia sunt, which is Latin for "Justice and fortitude are invincible".

== Notable people ==
=== Maguire ===
- Andrew Maguire (born 1939), American politician and former member of U.S. House of Representatives from New Jersey
- Baron Maguire, Two Barons Maguire of Enniskillen in the Peerage of Ireland
- Bassett Maguire (1904–1991), American botanist
- Bernard A. Maguire (1818–1886), American Jesuit and president of Georgetown University
- Bob Maguire (1934–2023), Australian priest and community worker
- Brendan Maguire (born 1975), Canadian politician from Nova Scotia, provincial Community Services Minister
- Cathy Maguire, Irish singer-songwriter, TV personality from Dundalk, Co Louth.
- Charles A. Maguire (1876–1949), Canadian politician; mayor of Toronto 1922–1923
- Chris Maguire (born 1989), Scottish footballer
- Clare Maguire (born 1988), British singer-songwriter
- Connor Maguire, 2nd Baron of Enniskillen, Irish rebel of 1641
- Darragh Maguire (born 1976), Irish footballer
- Donna Maguire (born 1967), Provisional IRA member
- Eleanor Maguire (1970–2025), Irish neuropsychologist
- Emily Maguire (disambiguation), multiple people
- Eric Maguire, American politician
- Frank Maguire (1929–1981), Northern Ireland politician and MP
- Gavin Maguire (born 1967), Welsh footballer
- George Maguire (born 1990), Olivier Award-winning English actor
- George Maguire (1796–1882), Irish-American mayor of St. Louis, Missouri, USA
- Gerard Maguire (born 1945), Australian actor
- Gregory Maguire (born 1954), American author
- Harold Maguire (1912–2001), Director-General of Intelligence at the British Ministry of Defence
- Harry Maguire (born 1993), English footballer
- Harry Maguire (sailor), (1928–2007), Irish Olympian
- Helen Maguire (elected 2024), British politician
- Hugh Maguire (Lord of Fermanagh) (died 1600), Lord of Fermanagh in Ireland during the reign of Elizabeth
- Hugh Maguire (violinist) (1927–2013), Irish violinist
- Jack Maguire (baseball) (1925–2001), American baseball player
- James G. Maguire (1853–1920), American politician; U.S. representative from California
- Jeff Maguire (born 1952), American film screenwriter
- Jeremy Maguire (born 2011), American actor
- John A. Maguire (1870–1939), American politician from Nebraska
- John Aloysius Maguire (1851–1920), Catholic Archbishop of Glasgow, Scotland
- John Norman Maguire (born 1956), Australian cricketer
- John Maguire (disambiguation), multiple people
- Jon Maguire, songwriter and producer
- Joseph Maguire (contemporary), U.S. Navy rear admiral, Commander of the Naval Special Warfare Command
- Joseph Francis Maguire (1919–2014), American Catholic bishop
- Josh Maguire (born 1980), Australian soccer player
- Kathleen Maguire (1925–1989), American actress
- Kevin Maguire (born 1960), American comic book artist
- Kristin Maguire, American politician and former chairman of the South Carolina State Board of Education
- Larry Maguire (born 1949), Canadian politician and activist farmer in Manitoba; representative in the Manitoba legislature
- Leona Maguire (born 1994), Irish golfer, twin of Lisa
- Lisa Maguire (born 1994), Irish golfer, twin of Leona
- Máiread Corrigan-Maguire (born 1944), Northern Irish peace activist
- Marian Maguire (born 1962), New Zealand lithographer
- Martie Maguire (born 1969), American country music songwriter and singer; founding member of the Dixie Chicks
- Mary Maguire (1919–1974), born Hélène Teresa Maguire, Australian actress
- Matt Maguire (born 1984), Australian rules footballer
- Michael Maguire (disambiguation), multiple people
- Paul Maguire (born 1938), American football player and sportscaster
- Robert Maguire (disambiguation), multiple people
- Roger Maguire (1641–1708), Irish Jacobite soldier and official
- Rory Maguire (soldier) (1619–1648), Irish rebel soldier
- Sam Maguire (1879–1927), Irish republican and Gaelic footballer; eponym of the Sam Maguire Cup
- Sarah Maguire (1957–2017), British poet
- Sharon Maguire (born 1960), British film maker
- Stephen Maguire (born 1981), Scottish professional snooker player
- Steve Maguire (contemporary), American software engineer and author
- Thomas Herbert Maguire (1821–1895) was an English artist and engraver
- Tobey Maguire (born 1975), American actor; best known for Spider-Man
- Tom Maguire (1892–1993), Irish Republican Army commandant-general

=== McGuire ===
- Al McGuire (1928–2001), American college basketball coach & Basketball Hall of Fame inductee
- Anne McGuire (born 1949), Scottish politician; MP for Stirling
- Barry McGuire (born 1935), American singer and songwriter
- Barry McGuire (born 1964), Louisiana author, painter and songwriter "Tales from Houma"
- Bill McGuire (volcanologist), English professor of volcanology
- Billy and Benny McCrary, known as "The McGuire Twins", Guinness World Record holders for "World's Heaviest Twins"
- Brian McGuire (1945–1977), Australian race-car driver
- Bruce McGuire (born 1962), Australian rugby league player
- Casey McGuire (born 1980), Australian rugby league player
- Cindy May McGuire (born 1996), Indonesian beauty pageant titleholder, Puteri Indonesia DKI Jakarta 5 and Puteri Indonesia 2022 contestant
- Danny McGuire (born 1982), English rugby league player
- Deacon McGuire (1863–1936), American professional baseball player, manager, and coach
- Deck McGuire (born 1989), American professional baseball player
- Dennis McGuire (disambiguation), multiple people
- Dick McGuire (1926–2010), American professional basketball player and coach
- Dominic McGuire, American professional basketball player
- Dorothy McGuire (1916–2001), American actress
- Eamonn McGuire (1939–2013), Irish rugby union player
- Eddie McGuire (born 1964), Australian television journalist, sportscaster, and game show host
- Edith McGuire (born 1944), American Olympic athlete in sprinting events in the 1964 Olympics
- Edward McGuire (composer) (born 1948), Scottish composer
- Elijah McGuire (born 1994), American football player
- Frank McGuire (1916–1994), American college basketball coach
- Fred Henry McGuire, American Medal of Honor recipient
- Garret McGuire, American football coach and former player
- Gary McGuire (born 1938), English footballer
- Hunter McGuire (1835–1900), American physician, teacher, and orator
- Kathleen McGuire (born 1965), Australian-American musician (conductor, composer, educator)
- Kathryn McGuire (1903–1978), American silent film actress and dancer
- Kristen McGuire, American voice actress
- Isaiah McGuire (born 2001), American football player
- James McGuire (VC) (1827–1862), Irish recipient of the Victoria Cross
- James Kennedy McGuire (1868–1923), American politician; mayor of Syracuse, New York
- Jim McGuire (baseball coach), American college baseball coach
- Joe McGuire (born 1944), Canadian politician; MP from Prince Edward Island
- John McGuire (disambiguation), multiple people
- Josh McGuire (born 1990), Australian Rugby League player
- Maeve McGuire (born 1937), American soap opera actress
- Melanie McGuire (born 1972), American criminal who murdered her husband, dismembered his body and put it into suitcases
- The McGuire Sisters (Christine, Dorothy, Phyllis), American singers (biological sisters)
- Michael McGuire (disambiguation), multiple people
- Molly McGuire, Canadian-American singer and songwriter
- Nathan McGuire (born 2003), Irish cricketer
- Patrick McGuire (disambiguation), multiple people
- Patti McGuire (born 1951), American model; Playboy Playmate of the Year 1977
- Paul McGuire (disambiguation), multiple people
- Peter J. McGuire (1852–1906), American labor leader; important figure in the AFL
- Phil McGuire (field hockey) (born 1970), British former field hockey player
- Phil McGuire (footballer) (born 1980), Scottish footballer
- Pierre McGuire (born 1961), American ice hockey analyst and sports commentator
- Reba Rambo-McGuire, Christian singer and songwriter
- Reese McGuire, American baseball player
- Roger A. McGuire (1943–2005), American ambassador
- Saundra McGuire, American chemistry educator
- Thomas McGuire (1920–1945), American WWII flying ace; eponym of McGuire AFB
- Tip McGuire (born 1987), Wisconsin politician
- Victor McGuire, English actor
- William Anthony McGuire, American screenwriter and dramatist
- William W. McGuire, American physician; former CEO of UnitedHealth Group

Fictional people

- Bren McGuire, player character from the Turrican video game series
- Father Dougal McGuire, character in the television series Father Ted
- Edward McGuire (economist), persona of comedian Charles Firth (comedian) of Australia
- Frankie McGuire, character from The Devil's Own
- Jerry Maguire, titular character from the 1996 film of the same name
- Lizzie McGuire, title character of the TV series
- Dr. Jack McGuire, character in the television series Doogie Howser
- Rachel McGuire, character from Boy Meets World
- Sean MacGuire, character from the video game Red Dead Redemption 2
- Sean Maguire, character from the movie Good Will Hunting

=== McGwire ===
- Two American sportspeople, fellow-siblings:
  - Mark McGwire (born 1963), baseball player
  - Dan McGwire (born 1967), football player

== Kings of Fermanagh ==
Name	Ascension	Death	Notes (date abdicated or deposed)
Donn Óc	c.1292	1302	
Flaithbertach mac Duinn	1302	1327	
Ruaidhri mac Flaithbheartaigh	1327	1358	
Aodh Ruadh mac Flaithbheartaigh	1358	1363	
Pilib mac Aodh Ruaidh	1363	16 March 1395	
Tomas Mór mac Pilib	1395	13 November 1430	
Thomas Óg mac Thomáis	1430	1480	Abdicated 1471.
Éamonn mac Thomáis Óig	1471	1488	Abdicated 6 November 1486.
Thomáis Óg mac Thomáis Óig	1484	1501	Deposed 1486.
Seánn mac Pilib meic Thomáis Mhóir	1486	1503	
Conchobhar Mór mac Thomáis Óig	1503	1527	
Cú Connacht Óg mac Con Connacht	1527	1538	
Giolla Pádraig Bán mac Conchobhair Mhóir	1538	1540	
Seaán mac Con Connacht Óig	1540	1566	
Cú Connacht Óg mac Con Connacht Óig	1566	17 June 1589	
Hugh Maguire	1589	1601	
Cú Chonnacht Óg mac Con Connacht Óig	1601	1609	Fled 1607.
Connor Roe Maguire (Conchobhar Ruadh mac Conchobhair Óig meic Conchobhair Mhóir)	1607	1625	

== See also ==
- County Fermanagh
- Clan MacQuarrie
- Irish clans
