= Baron Ranelagh =

Baron Ranelagh, of Ranelagh in the County of Wicklow, was a title in the Peerage of Ireland. It was created on 18 April 1715 for Sir Arthur Cole, 2nd Baronet, who had earlier represented Enniskillen and Roscommon in the Irish House of Commons. The Baronetcy, of Newland in the County of Dublin, was created in the Baronetage of Ireland in 1660 for his father Sir John Cole, 1st Baronet, a member of the Irish Parliament for County Fermanagh. He married Elizabeth Chichester, daughter of Lieutenant-Colonel John Chichester and the Honourable Mary Jones, daughter of Roger Jones, 1st Viscount Ranelagh, and aunt of Richard Jones, 1st Earl of Ranelagh (on whose death in 1712 the viscountcy became dormant while the earldom became extinct). Lord Ranelagh was childless and the titles became extinct on his death in 1754.

Michael Cole, brother of the first Baronet, was the ancestor of the Earls of Enniskillen.

== Cole Baronets, of Newland (1660) ==
- Sir John Cole, 1st Baronet (died c. 1691)
- Arthur Cole, 1st Baron Ranelagh (c. 1664–1754) (created Baron Ranelagh in 1715)

== Barons Ranelagh (1715) ==
- Arthur Cole, 1st Baron Ranelagh (c. 1664–1754)

== See also ==
- Earl of Ranelagh
- Earl of Enniskillen
