= Connor Roe Maguire =

Connor Roe Maguire may refer to:

- Connor Roe Maguire (died 1625), Irish Gaelic chief of Magherastephana, County Fermanagh
- Connor Maguire, 2nd Baron of Enniskillen, grandson of the above
