= Arthur Cole, 1st Baron Ranelagh =

Irish baron

Arthur Cole, 1st Baron Ranelagh (c.1669 – 5 October 1754), known as Sir Arthur Cole, Bt, between c. 1691 and 1715, was an Irish politician.

Cole was the eldest son of Sir John Cole, 1st Baronet, by Elizabeth Chichester, daughter of Lieutenant-Colonel John Chichester and the Hon. Mary Jones, daughter of Roger Jones, 1st Viscount Ranelagh, and aunt of Richard Jones, 1st Earl of Ranelagh.

He succeeded his father in the baronetcy around 1691 and was returned to the Irish House of Commons for Enniskillen in 1692, a seat he held until 1695. From 1695 to 1703 he represented Roscommon in the Irish Parliament.

In 1715, he was raised to the Peerage of Ireland as Baron Ranelagh, of Ranelagh in the County of Wicklow, a revival of the Ranelagh title which had become extinct on the death of his first cousin once removed the Earl of Ranelagh in 1712.

Lord Ranelagh was twice married. He married firstly the Honourable Catherine Byron, daughter of William Byron, 3rd Baron Byron and Elizabeth Chaworth, in 1692. After her death in 1746, he married secondly Selina Bathurst, daughter of Peter Bathurst, in 1748. Both marriages were childless. He died in October 1754 when the baronetcy and barony became extinct.

Rue de Ranelagh in Paris, France as well as the nearby Ranelagh metro station (opened in 1922) are named after Ranelagh.

Parliament of Ireland
Preceded by Not represented in Patriot Parliament	Member of Parliament for Enniskillen; 1692–1695; With: Sir Michael Cole	Succeeded by Sir Michael Cole; Abraham Creighton
Preceded by Henry Sandford; Hercules Davys	Member of Parliament for Roscommon; 1695–1703; With: Henry Sandford	Succeeded by Henry Sandford; Robert Sandys
Baronetage of Ireland
Preceded by John Cole	Baronet (of Newland) c. 1691–1754	Extinct
Peerage of Ireland
New creation	Baron Ranelagh; 1715–1754	Extinct
