= Mickey Maguire =

Mickey Maguire may refer to:

- Mickey Maguire (Canadian football)
- Mickey Maguire (Shameless)

== See also ==
- Michael Maguire (disambiguation)
