= Mickey McGuire =

Mickey or Mick McGuire may refer to:

- Mickey McGuire (baseball) (1941–2025), American second baseman/shortstop
- Mickey McGuire (ice hockey) (1898–1968), Canadian ice hockey forward
- Mickey Rooney (1920–2014), who worked under this name for a while
- Mickey McGuire (film series), two-reel shorts for strip Toonerville Folks
- Mick McGuire (footballer) (born 1952), English footballer
- Mick McGuire (general), American major general

== See also ==
- Mick Maguire, a traditional Irish folk song
- Michael McGuire (disambiguation)
- McGuire (surname)
