= Ranelagh (disambiguation) =

Ranelagh may refer to:

== Towns and villages ==
- Ranelagh, a residential area and urban village on the south side of Dublin, Ireland
- Ranelagh, Buenos Aires, a suburb of Buenos Aires, Argentina
- Ranelagh, Ontario
- Ranelagh, Tasmania

== Other places and geographical features ==
- The Ranelagh Club, a famous polo club formerly located at Barn Elms, South West London
- Ranelagh Estate, a residential garden suburb in Melbourne, Victoria, Australia
- Ranelagh Gardens, an 18th-century pleasure garden in Chelsea, London; now part of the grounds of Chelsea Hospital
- Ranelagh Gardens, Liverpool, a similar pleasure garden in Liverpool
- Ranelagh Luas stop, a light rail stop in Dublin, Ireland
- The Ranelagh River and Ranelagh Sewer, names at various times for parts of the River Westbourne
- Ranelagh School, Bracknell, England
- Ranelagh station (Paris Metro), a Paris Metro station on the Rue de Ranelagh, Paris
- Théâtre Le Ranelagh, a theatre in Paris

== People and titles ==
- Baron Ranelagh, a title in the Peerage of Ireland
- Earl of Ranelagh, a title in the Peerage of Ireland
- Viscount Ranelagh, a title in the Peerage of Ireland

== Schools ==
- Ranelagh School, a school in Berkshire, England

== Other ==
- Ranelagh Harriers, a road running and cross-country club based in Richmond, London
- HMS Ranelagh (1697), a ship of the British Royal Navy
