= Viscount Ranelagh =

1628 establishments in Ireland

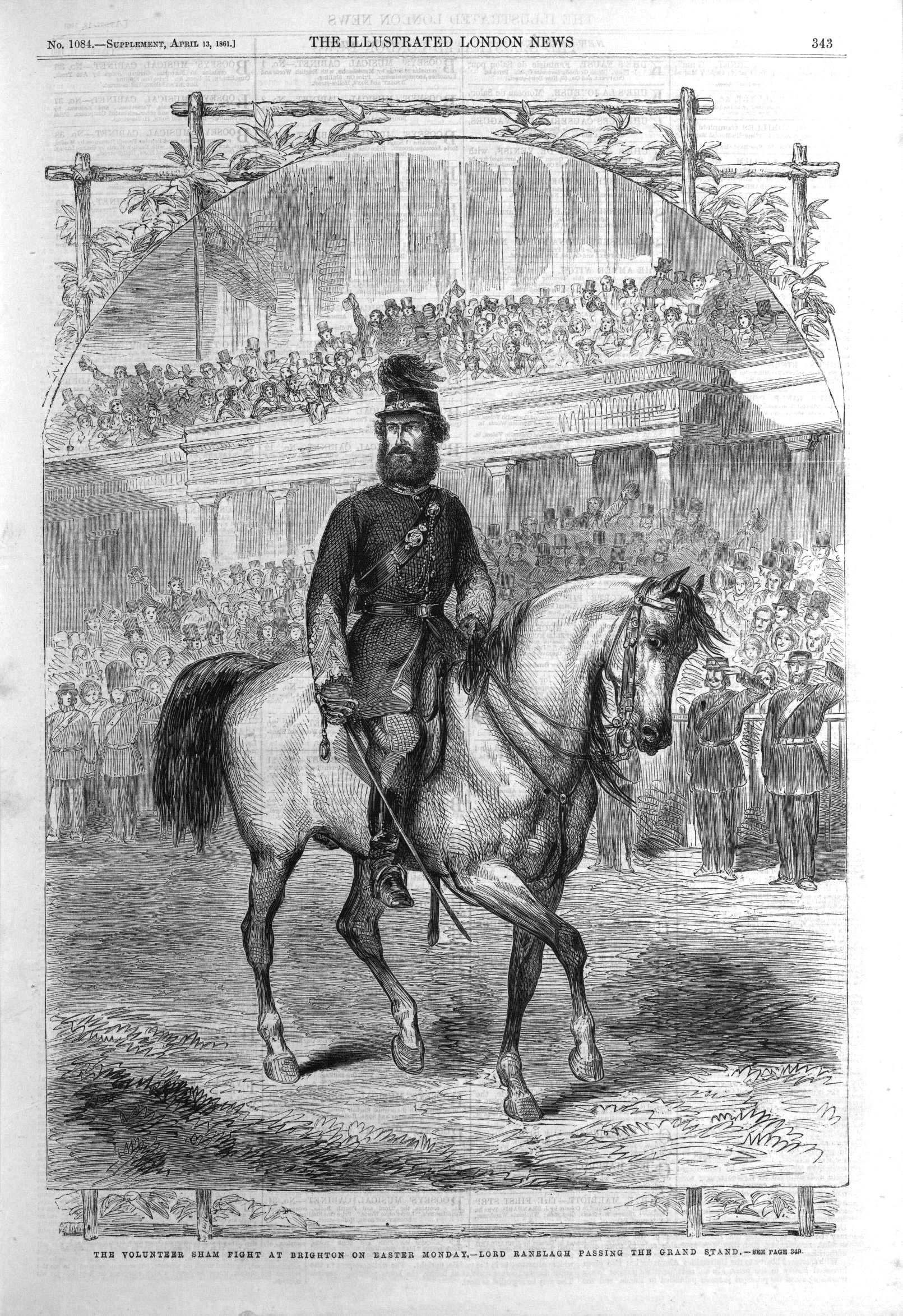
Thomas Jones, 7th Viscount Ranelagh.

Viscount Ranelagh was a title in the Peerage of Ireland. It was created on 25 August 1628 for Sir Roger Jones, son of Thomas Jones, Archbishop of Dublin and Lord Chancellor of Ireland. He was made Baron Jones of Navan, in the County of Meath, at the same time also in the Peerage of Ireland. Thomas Jones's father was Henry Jones, of Middleton in Lancashire. The first Viscount was succeeded by his eldest son, Arthur, the second Viscount, who represented Weobly in the English Parliament. Arthur was succeeded by his son, Richard, the third Viscount, who was created Earl of Ranelagh in the Peerage of Ireland in 1677. On Richard's death in 1712 the earldom became extinct while the barony and viscountcy became dormant.

They remained dormant until 1759 when Charles Wilkinson Jones successfully claimed the titles and became the fourth Viscount. He was the great-grandson of Thomas Jones, younger son of the first Viscount. He was succeeded by his son Charles, the fifth Viscount, a captain in the Royal Navy. The fifth Viscount was unmarried and was succeeded by his younger brother Thomas, the sixth Viscount. Thomas was succeeded by his son Thomas, the seventh Viscount, who is known for his involvement in the volunteer movement. The titles became extinct on the seventh Viscount's death in 1885.

Alexander Montgomery Jones, younger son of the fourth Viscount, was a vice-admiral in the Royal Navy.

After the earldom had become extinct and the viscountcy dormant in 1712, the Ranelagh title was revived in 1715 in favour of Sir Arthur Cole, 2nd Baronet, of Newland, who was made Baron Ranelagh. He was the son of Sir John Cole, 1st Baronet, by Elizabeth Chichester, daughter of Lieutenant-Colonel John Chichester and Mary Jones, daughter of Roger Jones, 1st Viscount Ranelagh, and aunt of Richard Jones, 1st Earl of Ranelagh. This title became extinct on Lord Ranelagh's death in 1754.

== Viscounts Ranelagh (1628) ==
- Roger Jones, 1st Viscount Ranelagh (before 1612–1643)
- Arthur Jones, 2nd Viscount Ranelagh (before 1625–1669)
- Richard Jones, 3rd Viscount Ranelagh (1641–1711) (created Earl of Ranelagh in 1674)

== Earls of Ranelagh (1674) ==
- Richard Jones, 1st Earl of Ranelagh (1641–1711)

== Viscounts Ranelagh (1628; Revived 1759) ==
- Charles Wilkinson Jones, 4th Viscount Ranelagh (died 1798)
- Charles Jones, 5th Viscount Ranelagh (1761–1800)
- Thomas Jones, 6th Viscount Ranelagh (1763–1820)
- Thomas Heron Jones, 7th Viscount Ranelagh (1812–1885)

== See also ==
- Baron Ranelagh
