= Arthur Champion =

Arthur Champion may refer to:

- Arthur Champion (Irish politician) (died 1641)
- Arthur Champion, Baron Champion (1897–1985)
