= Portora =

Portora may refer to:

- Portora Royal School in Enniskillen, County Fermanagh, Northern Ireland
- Portora Castle in Enniskillen, County Fermanagh, Northern Ireland
