= William Cole (planter) =

English soldier and landowner in Ireland

Sir William Cole (c.1571–1653) was an English soldier and politician, who participated in the Plantation of Ulster and established a settler town at Enniskillen, County Fermanagh. Despite his initial loyalty to the Stuarts, he was a leading English Parliamentarian figure in the Irish Confederate Wars of the 1640s.

== Early life and arrival in Ireland ==
Cole was born and raised in London, the only son of Emmanuel Cole of Devon. He was educated at Cambridge University before becoming a soldier in the English Army and fighting in the Low Countries during the Anglo-Spanish War. He arrived in Ireland in 1599 to fight in the Nine Years' War. He was commissioned as a lieutenant in 1601 and participated in the Siege of Kinsale in 1603, after which he was promoted to captain. In 1607, Cole was given command of Enniskillen Castle, which he later purchased outright in 1623. In 1611 he was granted 1,000 acres at Cornagrade and he purchased a further 1,000 acres at Dromskeagh in 1612. He constructed Portora Castle in 1612.

== Plantation of Fermanagh ==
In May 1612, Cole received a grant of land from James VI and I for a new town at Enniskillen, with a church, public school, market house, gaol and twenty houses for burgesses. Upon the town's incorporation on 7 February 1613, Cole became its first provost. He was knighted on 5 November 1617 and served terms as High Sheriff of Fermanagh in 1608, 1615, 1623 and 1627. In 1616 he was appointed a justice of the peace and collector of fines in Fermanagh. The 1622 commission into the progress of the Ulster plantation singled him out as a model planter who had encouraged the arrival of many English and Ulster Scots families to Enniskillen. In 1622 he helped fund the construction of the first Protestant church in the town, completed in 1627.

In 1633, Cole was briefly imprisoned in Dublin Castle for orchestrating protests in Fermanagh and Monaghan against the payment of contributions to the army. In 1634 and 1639 he was elected as the Member of Parliament for County Fermanagh in the Irish House of Commons. In 1640 he was part of an Irish parliamentary delegation sent to London to complain against the King's Lord Deputy in Ireland, Thomas Wentworth, 1st Earl of Strafford.

== Irish Confederate Wars ==
Cole was forewarned of the Irish Rebellion of 1641 in October 1641, when Rory Maguire attempted to have him murdered at Crevenish Castle, and Cole sent warnings to the Dublin Castle administration. Upon the outbreak of the rebellion that month, Cole led the successful defence of Enniskillen Castle against attacks by Maguire. Cole was one of four Ulster settlers commissioned by Charles I of England in October 1641 to raise regiments to defend the north-west of Ireland: taken into pay by the English parliament in July 1642, these forces formed the nucleus of the Laggan Army. He campaigned against the rebels in Fermanagh, retaking several key castles by 1643.

Cole was among the Ulster soldiers who resisted agreeing to the Solemn League and Covenant in January 1644, instead adhering to the Royalist authority of the Marquess of Ormond. Cole again refused to take the oath of loyalty to parliament in May 1644, but must have agreed to do so shortly thereafter. At the end of 1644, he was forced to go to London to defend himself against accusations of royalism and undue leniency towards Catholic rebels. He gave evidence in the trial of Lord Maguire in February 1645, regaining the favour of the Parliamentarians. Cole returned to Ireland in May 1645, bringing with him £10,000 to be distributed among the troops in Ulster. He defeated a rebel force at Irvinestown late in 1645.

In January 1649, during the Second English Civil War, Cole's largely-Scottish settler garrison at Enniskillen mutinied and declared their loyalty to King Charles, imprisoning Cole in his own castle. He was released soon after and was in London by June. In December 1649 he was commissioned by parliament to command 800 men to fight in the Cromwellian conquest of Ireland, but due to delays in recruiting he never went. He died in October 1653 and was buried at St. Michan's Church, Dublin.

== Family ==
Cole was married twice. His first wife was Susan, daughter and heiress of John Croft of Lancashire, by whom he had two daughters. He married secondly Catherine Parsons, daughter of Sir Lawrence Parsons. Together they had several sons, including Michael Cole, ancestor of the Earls of Enniskillen, and Sir John Cole, 1st Baronet.

Parliament of Ireland
Preceded by Sir Henry Folliott; John Davies	Member of Parliament for County Fermanagh; 1634–1642; With: Sir John Hume (1634–1635); Rory Maguire (1639–1642)	Succeeded by Sir John Cole, Bt; William Davys
