= Michael McGuire =

Michael McGuire or Mike McGuire may refer to:

- Michael McGuire (actor) (1930–2017), American actor
- Michael McGuire (author), Australian author and columnist
- Michael McGuire (politician) (1926–2018), British Labour Party politician
- Michael McGuire (racing driver) (born 1996), American stock car racing driver
- Michael J. McGuire (born 1947), environmental engineer and writer
- Michael T. McGuire (1929–2016), American psychiatrist
- Mick McGuire (footballer) (born 1952), English footballer
- Mick McGuire (general), American major general
- Mike McGuire (baseball), American college baseball coach
- Mike McGuire (basketball) (born 1977), American college basketball coach
- Mike McGuire (politician) (born 1979), American politician

== See also ==
- Michael Maguire (disambiguation)
- Mickey McGuire (disambiguation)
- McGuire (surname)
