= Kristin Maguire =

Kristin Maguire is a conservative politician from Clemson, South Carolina. She served on the state Board of Education from 1999 to 2009, and was the board's chairman from 2008 to 2009.

Maguire has served as the executive committeewoman of the South Carolina Republican Party.

== Background ==
Maguire is a graduate of Clemson University. She homeschooled her four children. A social conservative, Maguire co-founded South Carolina Parents Involved in Education, a group that promotes abstinence-only sex education, private school vouchers and a curriculum teaching intelligent design.

== Board of Education career ==
Maguire was initially appointed to the state Board of Education by the Pickens County Legislative Delegation in 1999 and reappointed by Governor Mark Sanford in 2004.

In 2000, as a member of the state board, Maguire challenged the state's newly proposed sex education standards for insufficient emphasis on abstinence. She specifically objected to the possibility of teaching oral or anal intercourse as alternatives to sexual intercourse, in violation of a 1988 state law forbidding the teaching of such practices.

Maguire was elected to the position of Board of Education chairwoman in 2008 by a 9–7 vote of that board. At the time, she was believed to be the only homeschooler in the United States overseeing a state board charged with managing and improving public education.

Maguire resigned from her position on the board in late August 2009 citing "family responsibilities".
