= Arthur Jones, 2nd Viscount Ranelagh =

Irish peer and politician

Arthur Jones, 2nd Viscount Ranelagh (died 1669) was an Irish peer and politician who sat in both the Irish House of Commons and the English House of Commons.

== Biography ==
Jones was the son of Roger Jones, 1st Viscount Ranelagh and his wife Frances Moore, daughter of Sir Garret Moore, eventual 1st Viscount Moore of Drogheda.

He was Member of Parliament for Sligo from 1634 to 1635 in the Irish House of Commons. In November 1640, Jones was elected to the Long Parliament as MP for Weobley in the House of Commons of England. but was disabled from sitting in 1643. He succeeded to the titles of Baron Jones of Navan, and Viscount Ranelagh on the death of his father in 1643.

In 1630 Jones married Katherine Boyle, the 15-year-old daughter of the Earl of Cork. Her brothers included the chemist Robert Boyle and Lord Broghill, the later Earl of Orrery who was a prominent politician in Cromwellian and Restoration times. They had 3 daughters and a son, Richard, who was created Earl of Ranelagh.

Parliament of England
Preceded by William Tomkins; Thomas Tomkins	Member of Parliament for Weobley; 1640–1643; With: Thomas Tomkins	Succeeded by Robert Andrews; William Crowther
Peerage of Ireland
Preceded by Roger Jones	Viscount Ranelagh; 1643–1669	Succeeded by Richard Jones
