= Steve Maguire =

American computer scientist

Steve Maguire is a software engineer and author. He wrote two books on software development, Writing Solid Code and Debugging the Development Process.

Maguire earned a degree in Electrical and Computer Engineering from the University of Arizona. In the late 1970s, Maguire was active in developing software developer tools and application utilities for the Processor Technology and NorthStar users' groups. He also authored a few video games. He went on to develop valFORTH in 1982. He also wrote the FORTH development system for Atari programmers that aided development of high-quality graphics applications and video games.

Maguire went to work for Microsoft in 1986, working on Macintosh applications. He was involved with the development of the Mac version of Microsoft Excel and led development of Microsoft's Intel/Macintosh cross-development system. He instigated Microsoft's adoption of a cross-platform shared code strategy.

In 1993, Maguire wrote Writing Solid Code, a guide for writing robust and bug-free C code. In 1993, Writing Solid Code won the Software Development Jolt Productivity Award and awards from the Society for Technical Communication.

While with Microsoft, Maguire was often called upon to help rescue troubled projects. His experiences led to the book Debugging the Development Process, a guide which helps project leads—and developers alike—manage their projects and enjoy their work. Debugging the Development Process won the 1994 Jolt Productivity Award.

Maguire lives in Cincinnati, Ohio, with his wife, Beth. He is an Executive Vice President for Storm Development, a website development company.

== Bibliography ==
- Writing Solid Code (1993)
- Debugging the Development Process (1994)
