= Michael Cole (politician) =

Irish politician

Sir Michael Cole was an Irish politician.

He was the son of Michael Cole and Alice Coote, and grandson of Sir William Cole, Provost of Enniskillen. Sir John Cole, 1st Baronet, was his uncle and father-in-law. By his wife and cousin Elizabeth Cole, daughter of Sir John and his wife Elizabeth Chichester, he had a son, John Cole MP, who was the father of John Cole, 1st Baron Mountflorence.

Michael Cole was educated at Trinity College, Dublin. Cole represented Enniskillen from 1692 until 1713.
