= Thomas Jones, 7th Viscount Ranelagh =

Promoter of volunteer army (1812–1885)

The Right Honourable The Viscount Ranelagh KCB
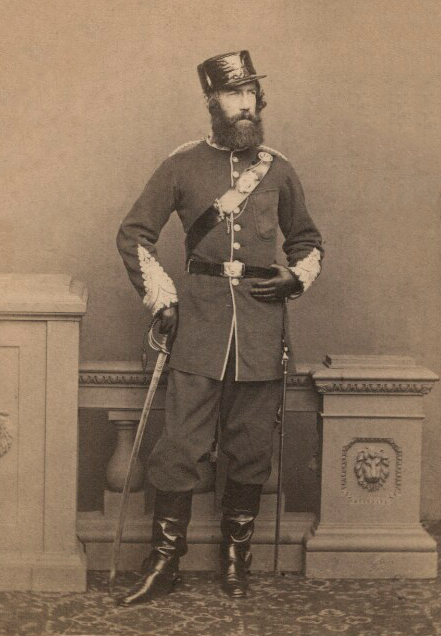
- Born: Thomas Jones; 9 January 1812; Fulham, London, England
- Died: 13 November 1885 (aged 73) Westminster, London, England
- Buried: Fulham, London, England
- Allegiance: United Kingdom
- Branch: British Army
- Rank: Lieutenant-Colonel

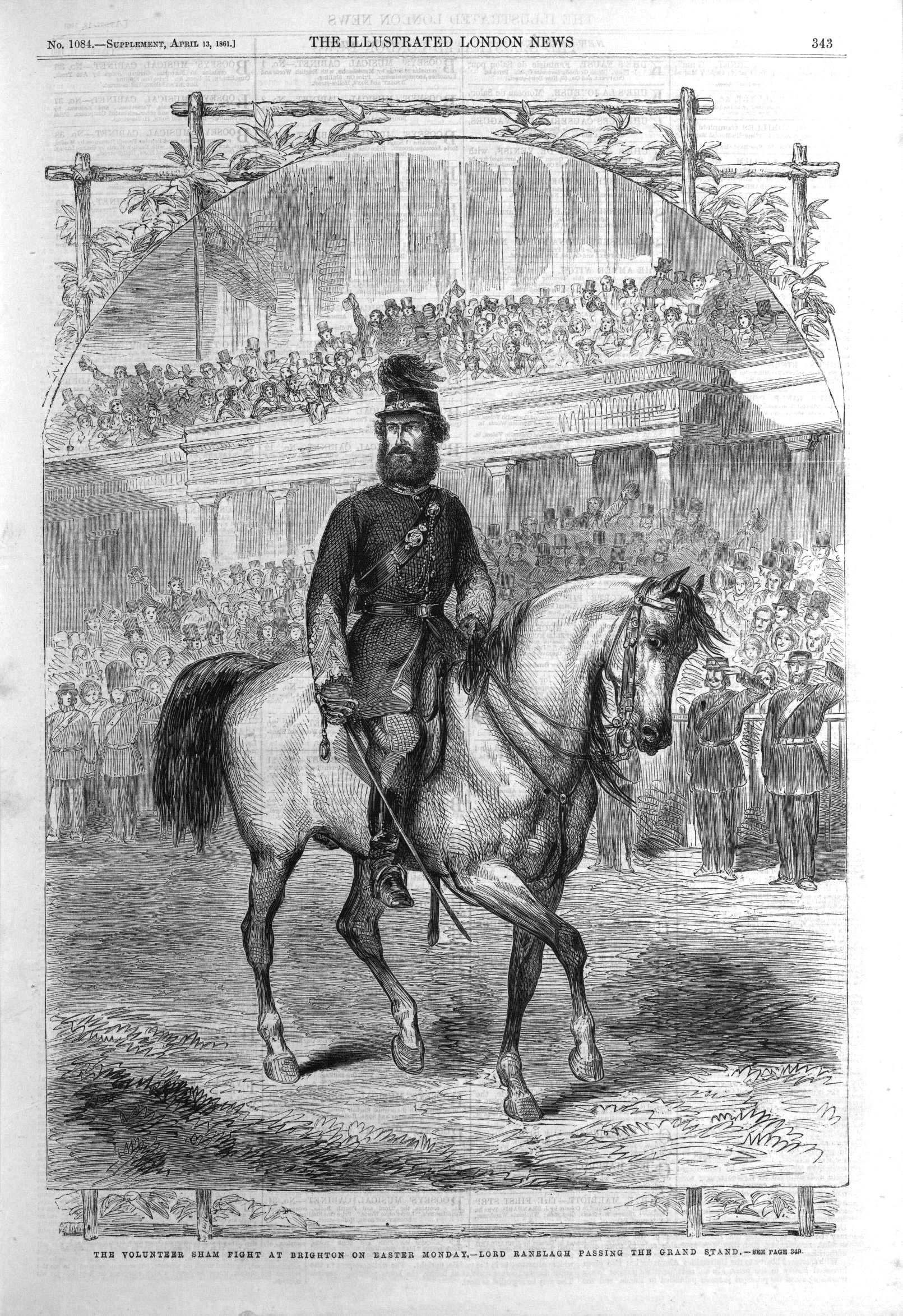
Viscount Ranelagh at the Volunteer gathering in Brighton, 1863, depicted in the Illustrated London News

Lieutenant-Colonel Thomas Heron Jones, 7th Viscount Ranelagh KCB (9 January 1812 – 13 November 1885) was known for his involvement in the volunteer movement to recruit amateur soldiers for the defence of Britain, and for his links to glamorous women, notably the Pre-Raphaelite model Annie Miller and the actress Lillie Langtry.

Heron Jones succeeded to an Irish peerage, becoming Viscount Ranelagh and Baron Jones of Navan in 1820 on the death of his father.

== Volunteer movement ==
Ranelagh was an enthusiastic supporter of the movement to create a volunteer army, which had arisen from fears of a French invasion. He created and commanded the 2nd South Middlesex Rifle Volunteers in 1859, the nucleus of which was formed from members of the Ranelagh Yacht Club. Ranelagh became a de facto leader of the Volunteer movement and was introduced as such to the French emperor Napoleon III. In 1863 Ranelagh helped to organise a show of force in Brighton at which he gave a speech defending the movement from attempts by the government to take control of it. He insisted that an independent volunteer militia was both cheaper and more effective for the country than a centrally organised force. He asserted that the English character preferred independence and distrusted "organisation", claiming that "we trust to our own pluck, that indomitable pluck that all Englishmen possess". At this period Ranelagh was calling for a volunteer "people's army", an aspiration supported by a section of the press at the time. He continued to command the Volunteers until his death in 1885.

== Relationships ==
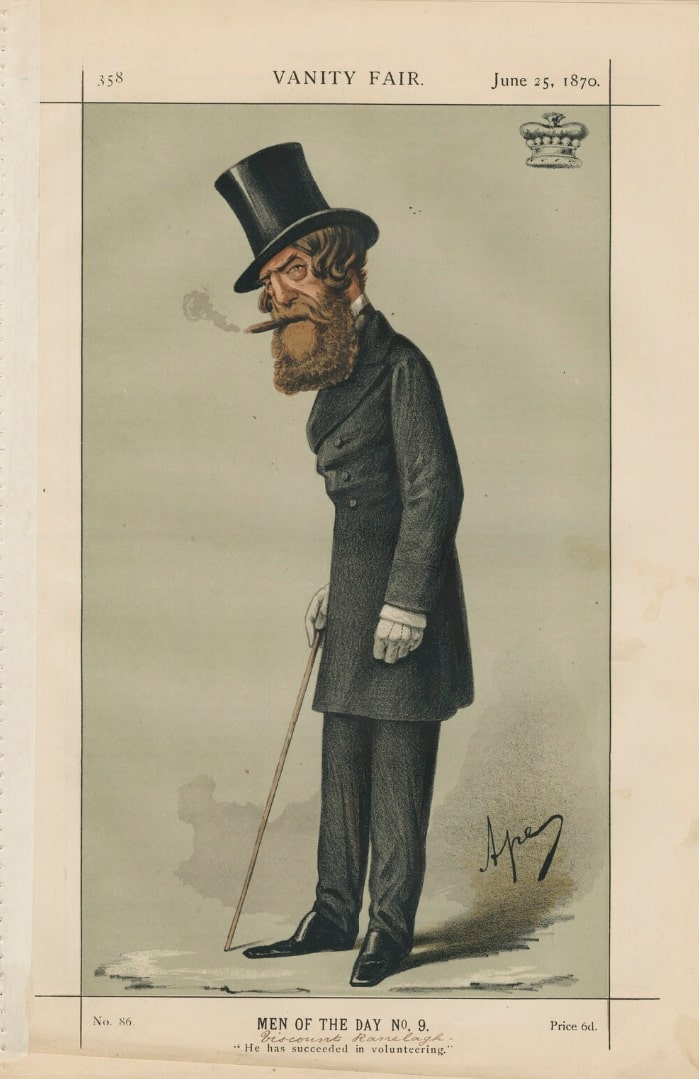
"He has succeeded in volunteering". Ranelagh depicted in Vanity Fair.

Ranelagh started a relationship with Annie Miller when her fiancé William Holman Hunt was away in the Middle East. He was described in the letters of Hunt and his friends as a "notorious rake" because of his womanising. When Hunt learned of the relationship he broke off the engagement, leading to a meeting between Annie and Ranelagh in which he suggested that she should sue Hunt for breach of promise. In the end, she married Ranelagh's cousin.

Ranelagh was also responsible for introducing Lillie Langtry to London high society. According to Langtry herself, "he completely changed the current of my life". She became the centre of attention at a party to which he invited her, and was asked by both John Everett Millais and Frank Miles to sit for a portrait.

With his partner, Ranelagh had two daughters and a son Arthur Jones who inherited his estate but being illegitimate could not inherit his father's titles. The titles of Viscount Ranelagh and Baron Jones of Navan became extinct upon his death in 1885.

== See also ==
Jones had two prominent relatives from his maternal grandmother:

- American Revolutionary War hero and former British Army officer Major General Richard Montgomery
- Colonel Alexander Montgomery, M.P. for County Donegal in 1768 and British Army officer

His sister Barbara married Count von Rechberg (1806-1899), Foreign Minister of Austria, 1859–1864.

== Notes ==
Peerage of Ireland
Preceded by Thomas Jones	Viscount Ranelagh; 1820–1885	Extinct
