= Tully Castle =

Castle in County Fermanagh, Northern Ireland

Coordinates: 54.458°N 7.806°W

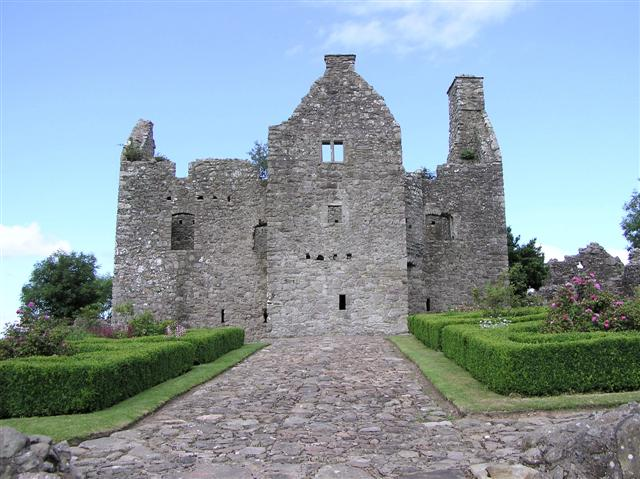
Tully Castle 2006

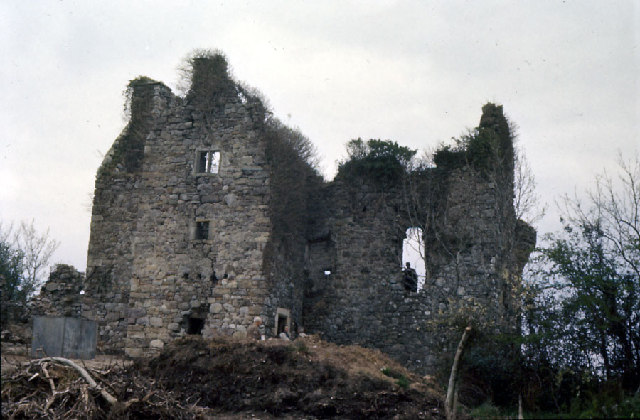
Tully Castle 1975

Tully Castle (Irish: Caisleán na Tulaí meaning "castle on the hill") is a castle situated in County Fermanagh, Northern Ireland, near the village of Blaney, on Blaney Bay on the southern shore of Lower Lough Erne. The Blaney area takes its name from Sir Edward Blaney, who was among the English advance party sent to Fermanagh to organise the Plantation.

Tully Castle was built for Sir John Hume, a Scottish planter. During the Irish Rebellion of 1641, the rebel soldier Rory Maguire set out to recapture his family's lands. He arrived at Tully Castle with a large following on Christmas Eve, and found the castle full of women and children. Most of the men were away. Lady Mary Hume surrendered the Castle, believing that she had assured a safe conduct for all in her care, but on Christmas Day the Maguires killed 60 women and children and 15 men, sparing only the Humes. The castle was burnt and the Humes never returned.

Tully Castle and village site are State Care Historic Monuments sited in the townland of Tully, in Fermanagh District Council area, at grid ref: H1267 5664.

== See also ==
- List of castles in Northern Ireland
