= John Maguire =

John Maguire may refer to:

- John Maguire (archbishop of Glasgow) (1851–1920), Scottish Roman Catholic prelate
- John Maguire (coadjutor archbishop of New York) (1904–1989), American Roman Catholic prelate
- John Maguire (cricketer) (born 1956), Australian cricketer
- John Maguire (fighter) (born 1983), English mixed martial artist
- John Maguire (MP) (1815–1872), Irish Member of Parliament
- John Maguire (senator), Irish senator
- John Maguire (rugby league), Australian former rugby league footballer
- John A. Maguire (1870–1939), American politician
- John D. Maguire (1932–2018), American college president
- John M. Maguire, CEO of Friendly's

== See also ==
- Jack Maguire (disambiguation)
- John McGuire (disambiguation)
