= Francis Bacon (judge) =

Arms of Bacon of Hessett, Suffolk: Argent, on a fess engrailed between three escutcheons gules as many mullets of the field pierced sable

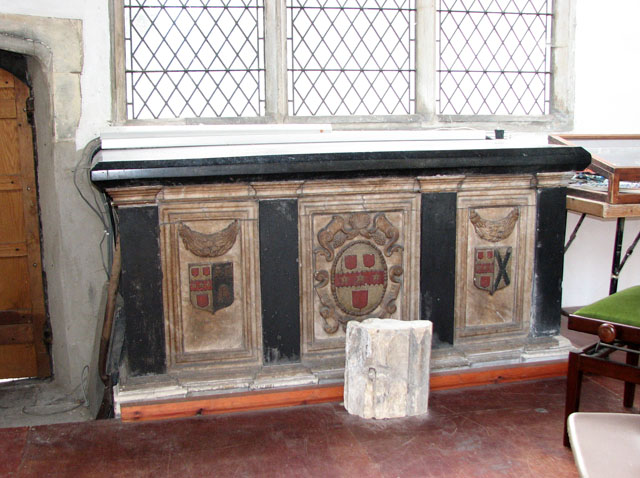
Chest tomb of Sir Francis Bacon in the Church of St Gregory Pottergate, Norwich

Sir Francis Bacon (1587–1657) was an English judge.

== Life ==
He was the son of John Bacon, of King's Lynn, Norfolk, born about 1587. As the inscription on his chest tomb states, he was a descendant of Thomas Bacon (d.1553) of Hesset in Suffolk, by his second wife Anna Rouse, a daughter of Henry Rouse of Dinington, Suffolk. He began his legal studies at Barnard's Inn, and was admitted a member of Gray's Inn in February 1607. He was not called to the bar until eight years later in 1615. His name as counsel is not found in contemporary reports, and it has been inferred that his practice must have been either in chancery or in the provinces.

In 1634, he was Autumn Reader at Gray's Inn; in 1640, he was admitted to the degree of serjeant-at-law. In October 1642, the king, being then at Bridgnorth on his way to London, appointed Bacon to a seat in the King's Bench. Among the propositions tendered by parliament to the king in February 1643 were demands for the dismissal of several of the judges, but 'Mr. Justice Bacon may be continued '. While Charles was at Oxford, Bacon was one of the sworn judges still at Westminster, of which there were three, and presided alone in the King's Bench, as Edmund Reeve and Trevor did in the Common Pleas and Exchequer.

At the trial of Connor Maguire, in Hilary term 1645, on the charge of high treason for his share in the Irish Rebellion of 1641, Bacon was the only judge. Lord Maguire had demanded to be tried by a jury of Irish peers; Bacon delivered his judgment that a baron of Ireland could be tried by a jury in England, and this judgment was formally approved of by both houses.

He committed to prison James Symbal and others in 1647 'for speaking of words against the king in time of war', with Serjeant Cresheld. He continued to sit on the bench until 1649, when new commissions were issued to the judges, and they were required to take the oath in the name of the people instead of in the king's name. Bacon and five of his brethren resigned their seats, while the other six judges agreed to hold office. After his resignation Bacon lived in retirement until his death on 22 August 1657.

His chest tomb monument survives in St. Gregory's Church, Norwich.
