= Custos Rotulorum of Fermanagh =

Civil officer

The Custos Rotulorum of Fermanagh was the highest civil officer in County Fermanagh.

== Incumbents ==
- 1661–?1691 Sir John Cole, 1st Baronet (died 1691)
- Sir Arthur Brooke, 1st Baronet (died 1785)
- 1769–1803 William Cole, 1st Earl of Enniskillen
- 1803–?1840 John Willoughby Cole, 2nd Earl of Enniskillen (died 1840)

For later custodes rotulorum, see Lord Lieutenant of Fermanagh
