= Edmund Borlase =

Edmund Borlase (1620–1682) was an Anglo-Irish historian and physician.

== Life ==
He was son of Sir John Borlase, who received the appointment of master-general of the ordnance, Ireland, in 1634, and held office as lord justice there from 1640 to 1643. Edmund Borlase is stated by Anthony à Wood to have been educated at Dublin, and to have obtained the degree of doctor in physic at Leyden in 1650.

He subsequently settled in Chester, where, according to Wood, he 'practised his faculty with good success to his dying day.' Borlase in 1660 received the degree of doctor of medicine from the University of Oxford. He enjoyed the patronage of Charles Stanley, 8th Earl of Derby, to whom he dedicated a treatise, published in 1670, on 'Latham Spa in Lancashire, with some remarkable Cases and Cures affected by it.'

In 1676, Borlase published at London an octavo volume of 284 pages, with the following title: The Reduction of Ireland to the Crown of England; with the Governours since the Conquest by King Henry II, anno 1172; with some passages in their government. A brief account of the Rebellion, anno Dom. 1641. Also, the original of the Universitie of Dublin, and the Colledge of Physicians. The work was mainly a compilation from printed books, and terminated at the year 1672. In it, the author introduced some medical observations on diseases prevalent in Ireland. Among remedies for dysentery, he mentioned that recently, in cases of extremity, great use had 'been made of swine's dung drank in a convenient vehicle.' The compilation of a history of affairs in Ireland from 1641 to 1662 was undertaken by Borlase chiefly with the object of demonstrating that the administrators of the English government there had not acted adversely to the royal interests nor unjustly towards Irish Catholics.

For the purposes of his work, Borlase obtained a copy of an unpublished treatise on Irish affairs by Edward Hyde, 1st Earl of Clarendon. This he unskillfully altered and interpolated, to make it accord with his views. Borlase's work, after expurgation by Sir Roger L'Estrange, was published at London in 1680: 'The History of the execrable Irish Rebellion, trac'd from many preceding acts to the grand eruption, the 23 of October, 1641, and thence pursued to the Act of Settlement, 1662.' The publication attracted little attention, owing to the defective style and absence of the author's name.

The appearance of Borlase's work induced James Tuchet, 3rd Earl of Castlehaven, to publish in the same year, at London, a small volume of 'Memoirs,' in which he gave an account of his 'engagement and carriage in the wars of Ireland.' Castlehaven's 'Memoirs' elicited a commentary which appeared at London in 1681, under the title of 'A Letter from a Person of Honour in the Country.' Borlase, at the instance of Arthur Annesley, 1st Earl of Anglesey, published in the following year 'Brief Reflections on the Earl of Castlehaven's Memoirs of his engagement and carriage in the wars of Ireland,' &c., London, 1682. This publication was anonymous, but the initials ' E. B.' were appended to the address to the king, prefixed to it.

Borlase gave Bishop Gilbert Burnet some materials for the 'History' of the Reformation,' among which were papers relative to the English translation of the Bible.

The date of Borlase's death has not been mentioned. A copy of Borlase's 'History of the Irish Rebellion' by him, in which he re-inserted the portions excised by the licenser of the press, together with Borlase's collections and correspondence connected with his 'History,' is now in the Stowe collection at the British Museum. Some of these papers were printed at Dublin in 1882, in the 'History of the Irish Confederation and War in Ireland, 1641–1643. Borlase's ' History ' was republished at Dublin in 1743, without the author's name. In this edition the word ‘execrable’ was omitted from the title, and some documents not previously printed were given in an appendix to the volume.
