= Paul Maguire (disambiguation) =

Paul Maguire (born 1938) is an American former professional football player and television sportscaster.

Paul Maguire may also refer to:

- Paul Maguire (footballer) (born 1956), Scottish footballer
- Paul Maguire (judge) (born 1952), Northern Ireland judge

== See also ==
- Paul McGuire (disambiguation)
