= Portora Castle =

Ruined castle in Enniskillen, Northern Ireland

Coordinates: 54.351°N 7.655°W

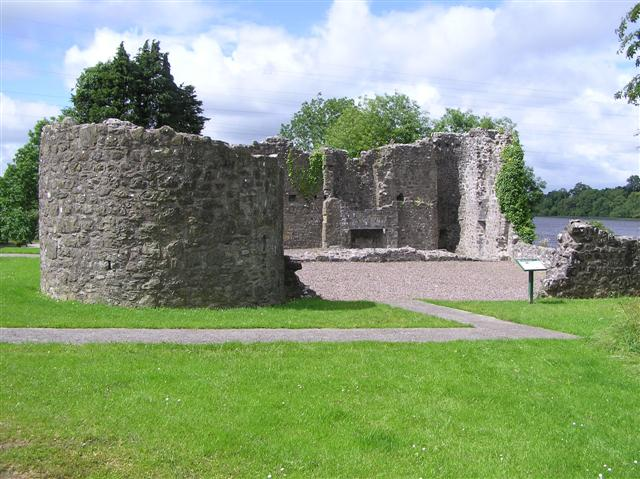
Portora Castle 2007

Portora Castle is a castle in Enniskillen, County Fermanagh, Northern Ireland. The castle was built for Sir William Cole who purchased the land in 1612. It is strategically positioned by the narrow exit of the River Erne into the Lower Lough Erne. It is a State Care Historic Monument sited in the townland of Portora, in Fermanagh District Council area, at grid ref: H2221 4531.

== Features ==
In 1619 Nicholas Pynnar described the castle as 'a bawn of lime and stone, 2.5m square, approximately 4m high, with four flankers and a stone house or castle three storeys high, strongly wrought'. Three of the flankers remain, the two on the west, flanking the walls of the castle. These round towers, about 3m in diameter, have several gun loops. Inside the castle can be seen proper fireplace chimneys in the north and west walls.

== History ==
Sir Michael Cole and his family moved to Portora Castle in 1710 when their previous residence, Enniskillen Castle, was hit by fire. They remained there until about 1716, when Sir Michael's son, John Cole (1680–1726), started building Florence Court.

The ford at Portora was important in the Erne Waterways and must have seen considerable traffic in peace and war. In the course of the Erne Drainage Scheme (1951–1960) a bronze dirk and stone axes were recovered at this point. The castle is now in ruins, partly because a group of truanting school-boys from nearby Portora Royal School, now Enniskillen Royal Grammar School, experimenting with gunpowder they learnt how to create in chemistry class, blew up a section in the latter part of the 19th century. They also tried digging under the building which added to its dereliction.

== See also ==
- Castles in Northern Ireland
