= Arthur Champion (Irish politician) =

Irish politician

Arthur Champion (died 23 October 1641) was an Anglo-Irish politician and landowner. He was murdered by Irish rebels early in the Irish Rebellion of 1641.

== Biography ==
Little is known of Champion's early life. By the mid-1630s, he was a merchant based in Dublin, engaged in the cloth trade through Chester. He had also become a moneylender and was among those advancing money to Richard Boyle, 1st Earl of Burlington in 1634, 1635 and 1636. This financial and mercantile activity enabled Champion to purchase land and by June 1639 he was living at Shannock, County Fermanagh. In 1639 he was appointed High Sheriff of Fermanagh, and following year he was made a justice of the peace and purchased the manor at Coole. In 1640 he was elected as a Member of Parliament for Enniskillen in the Irish House of Commons. However, parliamentary records do not show him making any speeches or sitting on any committees.

Early on the morning of 23 October 1641, a group of Champion's Irish tenants, working to the orders of Rory Maguire, murdered Champion in one of the first events of the Irish Rebellion of 1641. The group had arrived at Champion's Shannock house on the pretence of seeing him in his capacity as a justice of the peace; upon Champion's appearance, he was killed with knives. The rebels also killed several of Champions guests, including Thomas Ironmonger, Humphrey Littlebury and Christopher Lynas, and refused to allow their bodies to be buried for several weeks. News of the murder quickly spread in Ulster, enabling some Protestant settler communities to prepare to resist the rebels.

Champion had married Alice Allen at the Church of St. John the Evangelist, Dublin on 27 May 1621. At the time of his death, Champion had £6,971 owed to him be debtors. In his will, he left money for the maintenance of services at the Church of Ireland's Christ Church Cathedral, Dublin.

Parliament of Ireland
Preceded by Sir John Borlase; Sir Paul Davys	Member of Parliament for Enniskillen; 1639–1641; With: Sir John Borlase	Succeeded by Sir Michael Cole; Sir Robert Cole
