= Paul McGuire =

Paul McGuire may refer to:

- Paul McGuire (author), freelance author, writer and journalist based in Hong Kong
- Paul McGuire (diplomat) (1903–1978), Australian ambassador to Ireland then Italy during the 1950s
- Paul McGuire (radio host) (born 1953), radio talk show host, author, feature film producer and television commentator
- Paul McGuire (television host), host on Canada's CMT network

== See also ==
- Paul Maguire (disambiguation)
