= Rory Maguire (soldier) =

Colonel Rory Maguire (1619 – 13 November 1648) was an Irish politician and soldier. He was a leading instigator of the Irish Rebellion of 1641 and subsequently participated in the Irish Confederate Wars as a senior Confederate commander.

== Biography ==
Maguire was the second son of Bryan Maguire, 1st Baron of Enniskillen and Rose, daughter of Art MacBaron O'Neill. In 1639, Maguire was elected as the Member of Parliament for County Fermanagh in the Irish House of Commons. He received a commission in Charles I of England's Irish army in 1640. In May 1640 he married Deborah, widow of Sir Leonard Blennerhassett and daughter of Sir Henry Mervyn. Their son was the Jacobite politician, Roger Maguire, who later claimed the title Baron Maguire. Through his marriage to Deborah, Maguire became the owner of Crevenish Castle.

Alongside his older brother, Connor Maguire, he was a prime mover in the conspiracy which led to the outbreak of rebellion in Ireland on 23 October 1641. Maguire was tasked with securing County Fermanagh for the rebels, but was only partially successful, with several key fortresses in the county, including Enniskillen Castle, remaining under Protestant settler control. His attempt to murder Sir William Cole immediately prior to the rising failed, but the landowner Arthur Champion was killed in one of the first actions of the rebellion. In November 1641 he joined Felim O'Neill of Kinard at Newry to issue a proclamation in which the rebels claimed they were acting in defence of King Charles and Catholicism. In December 1641, the Fermanagh army under Maguire slaughtered many of the garrison and refugees in Tully Castle, apparently in retaliation for the killing of the garrison of a Maguire castle which had been taken by assault some days previously. He also destroyed Castle Archdale and its neighbouring settler village, and killed eight Protestants settlers at Monea castle. In early 1642, he was expelled from the Irish Parliament and in the summer of the same year he was made a colonel in Owen Roe O'Neill's army in Ulster.

Maguire was appointed Governor of Fermanagh by the authorities of the newly established Confederate Ireland. He commanded the rebel reserve in the Battle of Benburb in June 1646. Maguire led raids into Protestant-held areas in east Ulster, before joining O'Neill in his campaigns in Leinster in the autumn of 1646. Later that year, he raided lands in Connaught controlled by the Royalist commander, Ulick Burke, 1st Marquess of Clanricarde. In August 1647, O'Neill and Maguire moved the army to Leinster, where Maguire quarrelled so vigorously with O'Neill over the payment of troops that the general ordered his arrest and court-martialled him. After the court martial, Maguire and his supporters, about five or six regiments, drew up their forces and threatened to desert. The mutiny soon dissipated and Maguire remained allied to O'Neill.

In 1648, Maguire joined O'Neill in opposing the truce between the Confederates and Royalists; he played a prominent role in the skirmishes and evasive manoeuvrings that occurred between the two sides in central Ireland. In the winter of 1648, Maguire withdrew north and on 13 November he was killed while leading an attack on a fortress near Carrick-on-Shannon.

Parliament of Ireland
Preceded by Sir William Cole; Sir John Hume	Member of Parliament for County Fermanagh; 1639–1642; With: Sir William Cole	Succeeded by Sir John Cole, Bt; William Davys
