= Thomas Jones (bishop) =

16th and 17th-century bishop from Ireland

The Right Reverend Thomas Jones D.D.
- Archbishop of Dublin; Bishop of Glendalough; Primate of Ireland
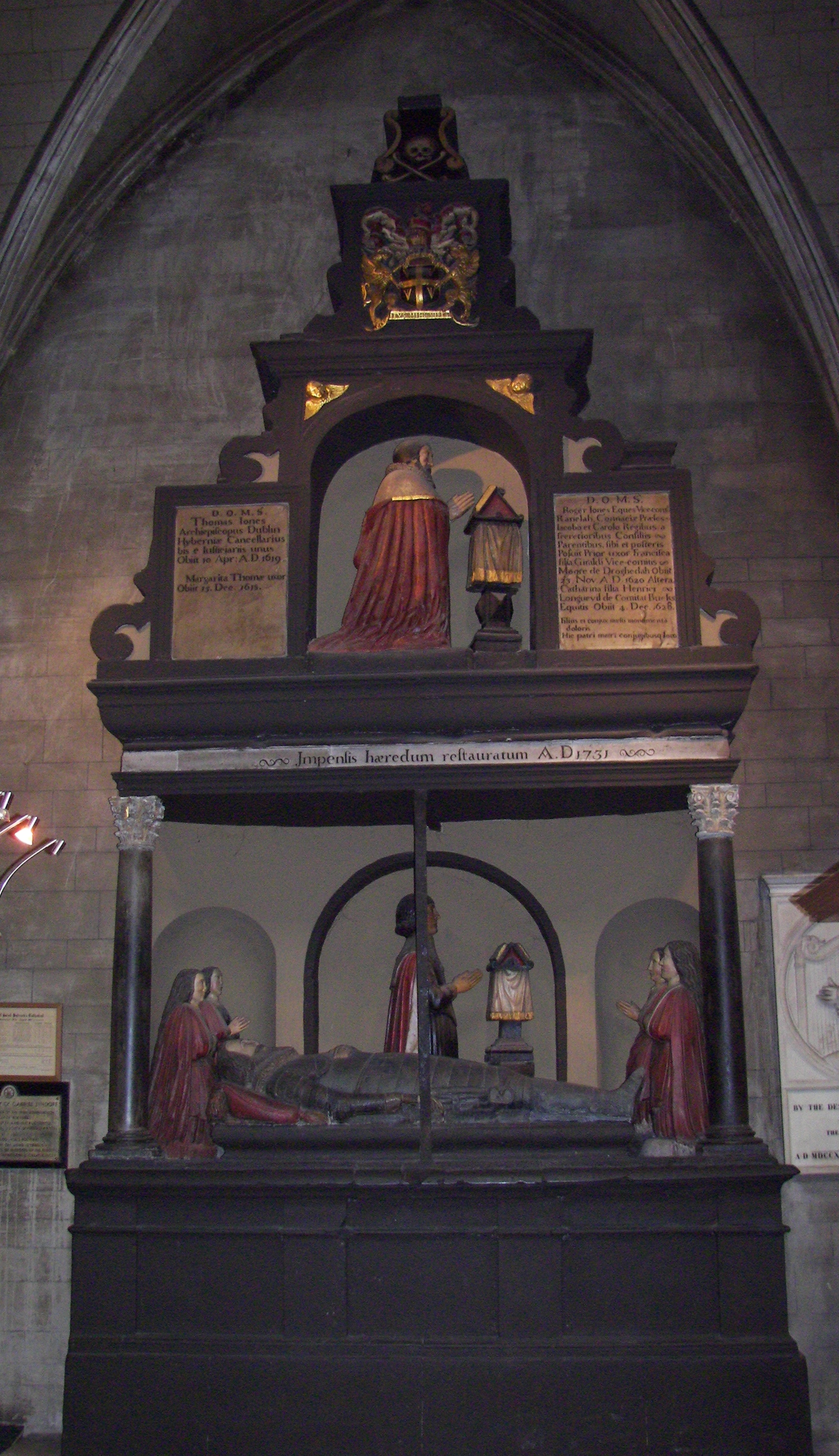
- Memorial to Thomas Jones in St. Patrick's Cathedral, Dublin
- Church: Church of Ireland
- Province: Dublin
- Diocese: Dublin and Glendalough
- Appointed: 8 October 1605
- In office: 1605–1619
- Predecessor: Adam Loftus
- Successor: Lancelot Bulkeley
- Previous post: Bishop of Meath (1584-1613)

Orders
- Consecration: 12 May 1584 by Adam Loftus

Personal details
- Born: c. 1550 Middleton, Lancashire, England
- Died: 10 April 1619 Dublin, Ireland
- Buried: St Patrick's Cathedral, Dublin
- Denomination: Anglican
- Spouse: Margaret Purdon
- Children: 3, including Roger

Thomas Jones (c. 1550 – 10 April 1619) was Archbishop of Dublin and Lord Chancellor of Ireland. He was also Dean of St. Patrick's Cathedral and Bishop of Meath. He was the patrilineal ancestor of the Viscounts Ranelagh.

== Early life ==
Jones was born in Middleton, Lancashire, circa 1550. He was a native of Lancashire. He was the son of Henry Jones, Esq. of Middleton. Nothing is known of his mother. His brother, Sir Roger Jones, Alderman of London, was knighted at Whitehall. Thomas acquired a Master of Arts from Christ's College, Cambridge in 1573, after which he relocated to Ireland. He married a widow, Margaret Purdon, who was also a sister-in-law of Archbishop Adam Loftus; she is thought to have been a member of the prominent landowning Purdon family of Ballyclogh, County Cork. His relationship with Loftus proved beneficial to Jones. He has been referred to, uncharitably, as Loftus's "pale shadow"; a more balanced view is that the two men thought alike on most issues and so worked harmoniously together.

Jones was named Chancellor of St. Patrick's Cathedral and was elected Dean in 1581. While Dean, Jones granted questionable leases of church property including, in particular, a 161-year lease of a coal mine which caused a later Dean of St. Patrick's, Jonathan Swift, to rebuke Jones severely for his improvidence:

A lease of Colemine (i.e. a coal mine) made by that rascal Dean Jones, and the knaves or fools of his Chapter, to one John Allen, for eighty-one years, to commence at the expiration of a lease for eighty-one years, made in 1585; so that there was a lease for 161 years of 253 acres (1.0 km^{2}), within three miles (4.8 km) of Dublin, for 2l. per annum, now worth, 150l.

— Jonathan Swift

== Archbishop ==
When the Archbishop of Armagh, Thomas Lancaster, died in 1584, the Lord Chancellor of Ireland (and former archbishop of Armagh), Adam Loftus, recommended Jones as his replacement, despite the unfortunate effects of his improvident leases of Church land. John Long was chosen for the position instead but, on 10 May 1584, at the written urging of Queen Elizabeth I, Jones was named Bishop of Meath. He was immediately called to the Privy Council of Ireland by the government of Lord Deputy John Perrot, a position he held for 20 years.

In August 1591 Hugh O'Neill, Earl of Tyrone, the effective leader of the old Gaelic nobility, and a man of very dubious loyalty to the English Crown, scandalised Dublin society by eloping with his third wife, the aristocrat Mabel Bagenal, whose English family were his implacable enemies. Since Mabel wished for a Protestant marriage ceremony, and O'Neill, although he was himself a Roman Catholic, was happy to indulge her wish, Jones was summoned to Drumcondra Castle, where the couple had taken refuge, by their host Sir William Warren. The Bishop was persuaded, although only with great reluctance, to perform the marriage. According to his own version of events, he did so solely to protect Mabel's reputation. His enemies accused him of being suspiciously close to O'Neill, and of taking bribes from him. His friends said that he used this supposed friendship to spy on O'Neill and provide intelligence to the Crown, and it does seem that the Crown gained a good deal of useful information in this way.

In April 1605, Adam Loftus died and King James I emphatically chose Jones to be Archbishop of Dublin, commencing the following November. He was also named prebendary of both Castleknock parish of St. Patrick's and the rectory of Trim in the Diocese of Meath:

Whereas, since the death of the late Archbishop, we have given an order for the supply of that See, because of same being a place so eminent within that kingdom; we took time to advise of a meet person for it; we have since upon conference with divers of our Council, found none more fit for the present time than the Bishop of Meath, in regard of his long experience in that kingdom, both in the ecclesiastical state as Bishop, and in the civil affairs as a Chancellor, wherefore we have made choice of him, and we are further pleased that he shall hold in commendam a prebend, which now he hath in possession, which he will nominate unto you.

— King James I of England

== Lord Chancellor ==
In 1605, Jones was appointed Lord Chancellor of Ireland, a position he held for the rest of his life. He was staunchly anti-Catholic, and a firm supporter of King James's Plantation of Ulster. In 1611, he sat on a Protestant Council in Dublin "to prevent sectarianism and extirpate Popery". He attended the opening of the Parliament of Ireland in 1613, where he gave an important speech. During this period, he had eight Roman Catholics excommunicated, imprisoned for recusancy and then had them reimprisoned after Parliament released them soon afterwards. He was a key ally of Sir Arthur Chichester, the Lord Lieutenant of Ireland, in his policy of extreme severity towards Roman Catholics. Jones was Lord Justice of Ireland in 1613, received an honorary DD degree from the University of Dublin in 1614, and again served as Lord Justice in 1615. He and his son, Roger Jones, 1st Viscount Ranelagh, were involved in several disputes with Christopher St Lawrence, 10th Baron Howth, the most serious of which involved neglecting the affray in Thomas St. in Dublin in 1609 in which a man was killed. The Crown was anxious to resolve the feud, and in later years Jones and Lord Howth managed to settle their differences and work together amicably. During his time as Archbishop, Jones saw that Christ Church Cathedral, Dublin underwent extensive repairs. On the other hand, he was accused of seriously neglecting the affairs of the Archdiocese, to the extent that many parishes had no vicar.

In old age, according to Elrington Ball, Jones suffered a notable deterioration in his character; he became fretful and querulous, and quite unable to bear the robust criticism which all Irish public figures are expected to endure. His enemies would spread malicious stories, such as a farcical claim that he was a wizard, simply to enjoy the hysterical efforts which Jones, who seems to have lacked a sense of humour, would make to refute them. As his powers failed, complaints that he neglected the affairs of his diocese became more frequent. He grew ill very suddenly and died at his episcopal palace, St. Sepulchre's Palace in Dublin in 1619. He was buried in St. Patrick's Cathedral, Dublin beside his wife, who had died four months earlier. Viscount Ranelagh, his only surviving son, had a monument and statue created with inscriptions for Thomas and his wife:

Thomas Jones, Archiepiscopus Dublin. Primas et Metropolitanus Hiberniæ, Esujdem Cancellarius, necnon bis e Justitiariis unus. Obiit Decimo Aprilis, anno reperatæ salutis humanæ 1619.

— Epitaph for Thomas Jones in St. Patrick's Cathedral, Dublin

The monument was restored in 1731 at the request of the then Dean of St. Patrick's, Jonathan Swift, despite his low opinion of Jones, quoted above.

== Family ==
Jones and Margaret had three children:

- Roger Jones, 1st Viscount Ranelagh
- Jane, who married Henry Piers of Tristernagh Abbey and had eight children
- Margaret (died 1615), who married Gilbert Domville, MP for Donegal, and was the mother of
  - Sir William Domville, Attorney General for Ireland.

Legal offices
| Preceded by In commission – last held by Archbishop Adam Loftus | Lord Chancellor of Ireland; 1605–1619 | Succeeded by In commission – next held by Adam Loftus, 1st Viscount Loftus |
Church of Ireland titles
| Preceded by Adam Loftus | Archbishop of Dublin; 1605–1619 | Succeeded by Lancelot Bulkeley |
