= Roger Jones, 1st Viscount Ranelagh =

Irish viscount and President of Connaught (died 1643)

Sir Roger Jones
- Viscount Ranelagh
- Tenure: 1628–1643
- Successor: Arthur, 2nd Viscount Ranelagh
- Born: before 1589
- Died: 1643
- Spouses: 1. Frances Moore; 2. Catherine Longueville
- Issue Detail: Arthur, & others
- Father: Thomas Jones
- Mother: Margaret Purdon

Sir Roger Jones, 1st Viscount Ranelagh PC (Ire) (before 1589 – 1643) was joint Lord President of Connaught with Charles Wilmot, 1st Viscount Wilmot. He commanded the government forces in Connaught during the Irish Rebellion of 1641 and the beginning of the Irish Confederate Wars defending Athlone against James Dillon until February 1643.

== Birth and origin ==
Roger was born before 1589 in Newry, County Down, Ireland, the only son of Thomas Jones and his wife Margaret Purdon. His father was an Anglican minister and had been consecrated Bishop of Meath in 1584, which was probably already the position he held at the time of Roger's birth. From Bishop he would be further advanced in 1605 to Archbishop of Dublin and Lord Chancellor of Ireland. His father's family was from Lancashire in England. His mother was a daughter of Adam Purdon of Lurgan Race, County Louth. His mother was the sister-in-law of Adam Loftus, Archbishop of Dublin.

Family tree

Roger Jones with his two wives, his parents, and selected relatives.

Thomas; Jones c. 1550 – 1619; Archbishop	Margaret; Purdon
Frances; Moore d. 1620	Roger; 1st Viscount d. 1643	Catherine; Longueville d. 1627
Arthur; 2nd Viscount d. 1669	Katherine; Boyle; 1615–1691;	Thomas; Jones	Elizabeth; Jones
Richard; 1st Earl; 1641–1712

Legend

XXX	Roger; Jones	XXX	Viscounts & Earls of Ranelagh

Roger listed among his siblings
The birth order is unknown.
- Roger (died 1643)
- Margaret, married Gilbert Domvile, Clerk of the Crown and Hanaper, and was the mother of William Domville, Attorney General for Ireland
- Jane, married Henry Piers, a recusant

== Early life ==
In October 1605 his father was appointed Lord Chancellor of Ireland and in November he became Archbishop of Dublin. On 26 March 1607 Jones was knighted at Drogheda and was henceforth known as Sir Roger Jones.

In 1608 his father became involved in a bitter feud with Christopher St Lawrence, 10th Baron Howth (also numbered as the 9th baron), in which Sir Roger Jones also became embroiled. His reference to Howth as a brave man among cowards was enough to provoke his opponent, a notoriously quarrelsome man, to violence. On 24 November 1609, Jones, Howth and their followers engaged in a violent fracas at a tennis court in Thomas Street, Dublin, in which a Mr. Barnewall was killed. The Lord Deputy of Ireland, Sir Arthur Chichester, an enemy of Howth, had him arrested immediately because he thought it murder, but it was found to be manslaughter.

== First marriage and children ==
In 1609 Sir Roger Jones married Frances Moore, the daughter of Sir Garret Moore, 1st Viscount Moore of Drogheda by his wife Mary Colley, daughter of Sir Henry Colley.

Roger and Frances had four children, two boys and two girls:

1. Arthur, his successor, married Lady Catherine Boyle, who was the daughter of Richard Boyle, 1st Earl of Cork, and also the older sister of the pioneering chemist Robert Boyle and of the writer Mary Rich, Countess of Warwick
2. Margaret, married John Clotworthy, 1st Viscount Massereene
3. Mary, married firstly Lieutenant Colonel John Chichester, son of Edward Chichester, 1st Viscount Chichester. Their son Arthur Chichester, 2nd Earl of Donegall, inherited the earldom from his uncle. They also had a daughter Elizabeth, who married Sir John Cole, 1st Baronet. After Chichester's death, Mary remarried Colonel Christopher Copley of Wadworth, and had further issue
4. Thomas, who married Elizabeth, daughter of John Harris and whose descendants would reclaim the Ranelagh viscountcy in 1759 after it had lain dormant since the death of Richard Jones, 1st Earl of Ranelagh in 1712

== Midlife ==
Sir Roger Jones was a member of the Parliament of Ireland for the borough of Trim in County Meath from 1613 to 1615. On 10 April 1619 his father, the archbishop died. On 20 August 1619, he signed for the first time as a member of the Privy Council of Ireland under Lord Deputy Oliver St John and Lord Chancellor Adam Loftus. On 23 November 1620 his first wife died. On 25 August 1628, Sir Roger was created 1st Viscount Ranelagh and Baron Jones of Navan by King Charles I.

== Second marriage and daughter ==
Ranelagh, as he was now, married as his second wife Catherine Longueville, daughter of Sir Henry Longueville, of Wolverton, co. Buckingham by his wife Katherine Cary, sister of Henry Cary, 1st Viscount Falkland, Lord Deputy of Ireland from 1622 to 1629.

Roger and Catherine had one daughter:

- Elizabeth, married Colonel Robert Sandys, son of Sir Edwin Sandys

His second wife died in 1627.

== President of Connaught, death, and timeline ==
On 11 September 1630 Ranelagh was appointed joint President of Connaught alongside Charles Wilmot, 1st Viscount Wilmot of Athlone, who had occupied this post alone since 3 June 1616. Ranelagh went to Athlone and took over the command of the troops and fortresses of the province, whereas Wilmot tried to play a role in Dublin, but kept the title and outlived Ranelagh, dying shortly after him, late in 1643 or early in 1644.

During the 5th session of the Parliament 1640–1649 the Catholic MPs tried to impeach Ranelagh, but the impeachment failed due to the opposition of the Protestant MPs.

After the outbreak of the Irish Rebellion in 1641 Ranelagh defended Athlone during 1642 against confederate troops led by James Dillon. in January 1643 the Lord Justices (Sir Henry Tichborne and John Borlase) sent Sir Richard Grenville to Athlone to bring him provisions, but Ranelagh decided to abandon Athlone and he and the garrison accompanied Grenville back to Dublin. On the way back they met a confederate force that Grenville defeated in the Battle of Rathconnell on 7 February 1643. At Dublin Ranelagh was accused to have failed in his duties as president of Connaught. A document of 74 articles was written and sent to the King. Ranelagh was first forbidden to leave Ireland, but the King then allowed him to come to Oxford and explain himself.

In 1643 Ranelagh died in Oxford while attending King Charles I. (Note: Burke states that Ranelagh died in 1628. This is unlikely as he was appointed joint president of Connaught on 11 September 1630.) He was succeeded by his son Arthur as the 2nd Viscount Ranelagh.

Timeline
Age	Date	Event
0	1589, before	Born
17–18	1603, 24 Mar	Accession of King James I, succeeding Queen Elizabeth I
19–20	1605	Father appointed lord chancellor of Ireland and archbishop of Dublin.
21–22	1607, 26 Mar	Knighted at Drogheda
23–24	1609	Married his 1st wife, Frances Moore
33–34	1619, 10 April	Father died.
34–35	1620, 23 Nov	First wife died.
39–40	1625, 27 Mar	Accession of King Charles I, succeeding King James I
39–40	1625, about	Married his 2nd wife, Catherine Longueville
41–42	1627, Nov	Second wife died abroad.
42–43	1628, 25 Aug	Ennobled by being created Viscount Ranelagh
44–45	1630, 11 Sep	Appointed joint President of Connaught
55–56	1641, 12 May	Strafford beheaded
57–58	1643, 7 Feb	Present at the Battle of Rathconnell
57–58	1643, Jun	Died and was succeeded by his son Arthur as 2nd Viscount

== Notes and references ==
=== Sources ===
- Ball, Francis Elrington (1926). The Judges in Ireland 1221–1921. Vol. I (1st ed.). London: John Murray. OCLC 832154869. – 1221 to 1690
- Burke, Bernard (1869). A Genealogical and Heraldic Dictionary of the Peerage and Baronetage of the British Empire (31st ed.). London: Harrison. OCLC 1045624502. – (for Ranelagh)
- Burke, Bernard (1883). A Genealogical History of the Dormant, Abeyant, Forfeited and Extinct Peerages of the British Empire (New ed.). London: Harrison. OCLC 499232768. – (for timetable: Strafford)
- Carte, Thomas (1851) [1736]. The Life of James Duke of Ormond. Vol. II (New ed.). Oxford: Oxford University Press. OCLC 1086656347. – 1641 to 1643
- Cokayne, George Edward (1895). Complete Peerage of England, Scotland, Ireland, Great Britain and the United Kingdom, Extant, Extinct, or Dormant. Vol. VI (1st ed.). London: George Bell and Sons. OCLC 1180818801. – N to R (for Ranelagh)
- Cokayne, George Edward (1904). Complete Baronetage, 1611 to 1800. Vol. IV (1st ed.). Exeter: William Pollard & Co. OCLC 866278985. – 1665 to 1707 (for Domville)
- Fryde, Edmund Boleslaw; Greenway, D. E.; Porter, S.; Roy, I., eds. (1986). Handbook of British Chronology. Royal Historical Society Guides and Handbooks, No. 2 (3rd ed.). London: Offices of the Royal Historical Society. ISBN 0-86193-106-8. – (for timeline)
- House of Commons (1878). Return. Members of Parliament – Part II. Parliaments of Great Britain, 1705–1796. Parliaments of the United Kingdom, 1801–1874. Parliaments and Conventions of the Estates of Scotland, 1357–1707. Parliaments of Ireland, 1599–1800. London: His/Her Majesty's Stationery Office. OCLC 13112546.
- Lennon, Colm (2004). "St. Lawrence, Christopher, ninth baron Howth (d. 1619)". In Matthew, Colin; Harrison, Brian (eds.). Oxford Dictionary of National Biography. Vol. 48. New York: Oxford University Press. pp. 647–648. ISBN 0-19-861398-9.
- Lodge, John (1789). Archdall, Mervyn (ed.). The Peerage of Ireland or, A Genealogical History of the Present Nobility of that Kingdom. Vol. IV. Dublin: James Moore. OCLC 264906028. – Viscounts (for Ranelagh)
- McGurk, J. J. N. (2004). "Wilmot, Sir Charles, first Viscount Wilmot of Athlone (1570/71–1644)". In Matthew, Colin; Harrison, Brian (eds.). Oxford Dictionary of National Biography. Vol. 56. New York: Oxford University Press. pp. 453–455. ISBN 0-19-861409-8.
- Murtagh, Harman (2004). "Dillon, Sir James". In Matthew, Colin; Harrison, Brian (eds.). Oxford Dictionary of National Biography. Vol. 16. New York: Oxford University Press. pp. 210–211. ISBN 0-19-861366-0.
- O'Flanagan, James Roderick (1870). The Lives of the Lord Chancellors and Keepers of the Great Seal of Ireland. Vol. I. London: Longman, Green and Co. OCLC 1003794464. – From the reign of Henry III to Constantine Phipps (for his father)
- Perceval-Maxwell, Michael (1994). The Outbreak of the Irish Rebellion of 1641. Montreal: McGill-Queen's University Press. ISBN 0-7735-1157-1. – (Preview)
- Pollard, Albert Frederick (1900). "Wilmot, Sir Charles, first Viscount of Athlone (d. 1633)". In Lee, Sidney (ed.). Dictionary of National Biography. Vol. LXII Williamson–Worden. New York: The Macmillan Company. pp. 59–61. OCLC 8544105.
- Russell, Rev. C. W.; Prendergast, John Patrick, eds. (1874). Calendar of the State Papers Relating to Ireland, of the Reign of James I. 1608–1610. Preserved in her Majesty's Public Record Office and Elsewhere. London: Longman & Co. OCLC 933154710.
- Russell, Rev. C. W.; Prendergast, John Patrick, eds. (1880). Calendar of the State Papers Relating to Ireland, of the Reign of James I. 1615–1625. Preserved in her Majesty's Public Record Office and Elsewhere. London: Longman & Co. OCLC 933154710.
- Walshe, Helen Coburn (2004). "Jones, Thomas (c. 1550–1619)". In Matthew, Colin; Harrison, Brian (eds.). Oxford Dictionary of National Biography. Vol. 30. New York: Oxford University Press. pp. 636–638. ISBN 0-19-861380-6.
- Webb, Alfred (1878). "Jones, Arthur". Compendium of Irish Biography. Dublin: M. H. Gill & Son. pp. 268–269. OCLC 122693688.

Peerage of Ireland
New creation	Viscount Ranelagh; 1628–1643	Succeeded by Arthur Jones
