= Roger Maguire =

Irish Jacobite soldier and courtier

Roger Maguire (1641 – October 1708), styled Lord Maguire of Enniskillen, was an Irish Jacobite soldier and courtier.

== Biography ==
Maguire was the son of Hon. Rory Maguire and Deborah, widow of Sir Leonard Blennerhassett and daughter of Sir Henry Mervyn. In 1648 he inherited the claim to the title Baron Maguire, which had been forfeited in 1645. He was a captain in the Earl of Antrim's Regiment of Infantry. In 1689, he was summoned to the Irish House of Lords as Baron Maguire of Enniskillen in the brief Patriot Parliament called by James II of England. James also appointed him Lord Lieutenant of Fermanagh. His claim to the title was never recognised by the Williamites.

Maguire subsequently raised his own Jacobite regiment in the Williamite War in Ireland and he fought at the Battle of Aughrim. After the Siege of Limerick, Maguire was attainted and joined in the Flight of the Wild Geese to France. However, no command was assigned to him in France and Maguire retired to the exiled Jacobite court at Château de Saint-Germain-en-Laye, where he died in 1708.

Maguire had married Mary, daughter of Philip MacHugh O'Reilly, and he was succeeded by his son, Alexander, who died in France in 1719.

Peerage of Ireland
New creation	— TITULAR — Baron Maguire of Enniskillen; Jacobite peerage 1689–1708	Succeeded by Alexander Maguire
