= Bryan Maguire, 1st Baron of Enniskillen =

Gaelic Irish nobleman

Bryan Roe Maguire, 1st Baron Maguire (Brian Rua Mag Uidhir; 1589–1633), was a Gaelic Irish nobleman from Magherastephana, County Fermanagh. He was the son of Connor Roe Maguire, nicknamed "the Queen's Maguire" or "the Traitor Maguire" for his support of Elizabeth I's campaign in the Nine Years' War. Bryan was knighted on 2 February 1626 and made "Lord Maguire, Baron of Enniskillen" by James I on 3 March 1627. The Annals of the Four Masters was compiled under his patronage. Lord Maguire's sons Connor Maguire, 2nd Baron, and Colonel Rory Maguire died as officers of Confederate Ireland.

Peerage of Ireland
New creation	Baron of Enniskillen; 1627–1633	Succeeded by Connor Maguire
