= Enniskillen (Parliament of Ireland constituency) =

Pre-1801 Irish constituency

Coordinates: 54.347°N 7.640°W

- Former borough constituency for the Irish House of Commons
- County: County Fermanagh
- Borough: Enniskillen

1613–1801
- Replaced by: Enniskillen

Enniskillen was a constituency represented in the Irish House of Commons until 1800.

== History ==
In the Patriot Parliament of 1689 summoned by James II, Enniskillen was not represented.

== Members of Parliament, 1613–1801 ==
=== 1613–1801 ===
Election	First MP		Second MP
1613	Roger Atkinson		Humphrey Farnham
1634	Sir John Borlase		Sir Paul Davys
1639	Captain Sir John Borlase		Arthur Champion (Note: Murdered in 1641)
1661	Sir Michael Cole		Sir Robert Cole
1689	Enniskillen was not represented in the Patriot Parliament		
1692	Sir Arthur Cole, 2nd Bt		Sir Michael Cole
1695	Abraham Creighton		Sir Michael Cole
1703	John Cole		Sir Michael Cole
1711	John Cole		John Corry
1713	John Cole		Richard Cole
1727	James Saunderson		Richard Cole
1730	James Saunderson		John Cole
1761	Hon. William Willoughby Cole		Richard Gorges
February 1768	Richard Gorges (Note: Changed surnamed Gorges-Meredyth in 1775)		Richard Gorges
August 1768	Richard Gorges		Armar Lowry (Note: Also elected for County Tyrone in 1768, for which he chose to sit)
1769	Richard Gorges		Bernard Smyth Ward
1771	Richard Gorges		Hugh Henry Mitchell
1776	Sir Archibald Acheson, 6th Bt		John Leigh
1777	Henry Flood	Irish Patriot Party	John Leigh
October 1783	Sir John Blaquiere (Note: Also elected for Carlingford in 1783, for which he chose to sit)		John McClintock
1783	James Stewart		John McClintock
1790	Arthur Cole-Hamilton		Richard Magenis
1797	Arthur Cole-Hamilton		Hon. Lowry Cole
1800	Arthur Cole-Hamilton		Henry Osborne
1801	Succeeded by the Westminster constituency Enniskillen		

== Bibliography ==
- O'Hart, John (2007). The Irish and Anglo-Irish Landed Gentry: When Cromwell came to Ireland. Vol. II. Heritage Books. ISBN 0-7884-1927-7.
- Leigh Rayment's historical List of Members of the Irish House of Commons. Cites: Johnston-Liik, Edith Mary (2002). The History of the Irish Parliament 1692-1800 (6 volumes). Ulster Historical Foundation.
