= Michael Maguire =

Michael Maguire may refer to:

- Michael Maguire (actor) (born 1955), American actor
- Michael Maguire (footballer) (1894–1950), Australian rules footballer
- Michael Maguire (rugby league) (born 1974), Australian rugby league football coach
- Michael Maguire (Gaelic footballer) (born 1965), Irish Gaelic footballer
- Michael Maguire (ombudsman), Police Ombudsman for Northern Ireland

== See also ==
- Maguire (surname)
- Michael McGuire (disambiguation)
- Michael MccGwire, (1924–2016), former Royal Navy commander, academic and international relations specialist
