= Paul McGuire (author) =

- Education: Monash University
- Occupations: Writer, Journalist
- Known for: Author of children books

Paul McGuire is a freelance author, writer and journalist based in Hong Kong.

== Career ==
In June 2002, McGuire wrote one of his first articles for South China Morning Post, titled "Best foot forward for walks in Macau". From 2002 to 2006, McGuire was a regular contributor to the South China Morning Post. McGuire wrote reviews, articles and features for the Arts and Education sections. A few of these have been reprinted in publications such as the Financial Times.

McGuire is a children's author. From 1995 to 2004, McGuire has written 12 children's books which were published by Oxford University Press. McGuire's books have been sold in several countries, including China.

In addition McGuire has reviewed restaurants for Hong Kong Tatler’s Best Restaurants Guide for over 20 years (which now also appear on the DeLuxe web site). McGuire is now the motoring Editor of the HK-based magazine 'Baccarat' and reviews super cars and covers general motoring stories, including F1. These articles also appear on the Luxury Insider web site based in Singapore.

He has also written an historical novel set at the time of the Peasants' Revolt (or Wat Tyler's Revolt) in 1381.

== Bibliography ==
=== Children's books ===
- Amy and the red box (2004)
- Barney the policeman (2004)
- Fireman Bill and the dragon (1995)
- How do you feel? (2005)
- It's Christmas (2005)
- Jo tells stories (2004)
- Old Hong Kong (2005)
- Save the animals! (2004)
- Save the Earth (2005)
- The Elephant Rock (2004)
- The fat prince and the angry man (1996)
- We can cook (2005)

=== Novel ===
- Peasants' Revolt - It is a historical novel.
