= Robert Maguire =

Robert Maguire may refer to:

- Robert Maguire (illustrator) (1921–2005), American illustrator
- Robert Maguire (architect) (1931–2019), British modernist architect
- Bob Maguire (1934–2023), Australian Roman Catholic priest, community worker, and media personality
