= Sir John Cole, 1st Baronet =

Anglo-Irish politician

Sir John Cole, 1st Baronet (died 1691) was an Anglo-Irish politician.

== Biography ==
Sir John Cole was the second son of Sir William Cole (died 1653), a key figure in the Plantation of Ulster, and his second wife Catherine Parsons, daughter of Sir Lawrence Parsons of Birr Castle, Baron of the Court of Exchequer (Ireland) and Anne Malham. William was a Londoner, the only son of Emmanuel Cole, from a family which originated in Devon. Sir Arthur Ingram, the investor, landowner and politician was a cousin through William's mother, Margaret Ingram. John's elder brother Michael was the ancestor of the Earl of Enniskillen.

Sir John Cole was a Royalist who, as Governor of Enniskillen, had been a prominent promoter of the interests of Charles II of England. On 23 January 1661, he was made a baronet of Newland in the Baronetage of Ireland in recognition of his loyalty to the Crown. Sir John Cole sat in the Irish House of Commons as the Member of Parliament for County Fermanagh between 1661 and 1666, and from 1661 to his death he was Custos Rotulorum of Fermanagh. Sir John Cole was one of the commissioners appointed to implement the Act of Settlement 1662 in Ireland. In 1675 he was made a member of the Privy Council of Ireland.

== Marriage ==
Sir John Cole married Elizabeth Chichester, daughter of Lieutenant-Colonel John Chichester and of the Honourable Mary Jones, daughter of Roger Jones, 1st Viscount Ranelagh, and aunt of Richard Jones, 1st Earl of Ranelagh.

== Children ==
Sir John Cole and his wife Elizabeth had eleven children, amongst whom were -

Arthur Cole, the eldest son, who succeeded to his father's title, and also was made Baron Ranelagh in 1715. Arthur had no issue and both his and his father's titles died with him.

Sir John Cole also had daughters -

Elizabeth married her cousin Sir Michael Cole.

Mary married Henry Hamilton-Moore, 3rd Earl of Drogheda.

Frances married Sir Thomas Domvile, 1st Baronet.

Parliament of Ireland
Preceded by The Protectorate	Member of Parliament for County Fermanagh; 1661–1666; With: William Davys	Succeeded by Not represented in the Patriot Parliament
Baronetage of Ireland
New creation	Baronet (of Newland); 1661–1691	Succeeded by Arthur Cole
