= Mickey Maguire (Canadian football) =

Profile
- Positions: Running back, defensive back

Personal information
- Born: c. 1926; Saint-Lambert, Quebec, Canada
- Died: September 29, 1993 (aged 67); Sainte-Anne-de-Bellevue, Quebec, Canada

Career information
- College: none - Montreal International

Career history
- 1949: Montreal Alouettes
- 1950: Calgary Stampeders
- 1951: Saskatchewan Roughriders
- 1952: Winnipeg Blue Bombers

Awards and highlights
- Grey Cup champion (1949)

Murray "Mickey" Maguire (c. 1926 – September 29, 1993) was a Grey Cup champion Canadian Football League (CFL) player.

Maguire was versatile, playing both sides of the football (as many players did during that time). He first played in the CFL with his hometown Montreal Alouettes, playing 3 games during their Grey Cup championship 1949 season. After a year with the Calgary Stampeders he played in the 1951 Grey Cup with the Saskatchewan Roughriders, where his fumble cost the team a touchdown in their defeat. He ended his career in 1952 with the Winnipeg Blue Bombers. He died on September 29, 1993, at .
