= Crevenish Castle =

Ruined bawn castle in County Fermanagh, Northern Ireland

Coordinates: 54°30′42″N 7°44′43″W

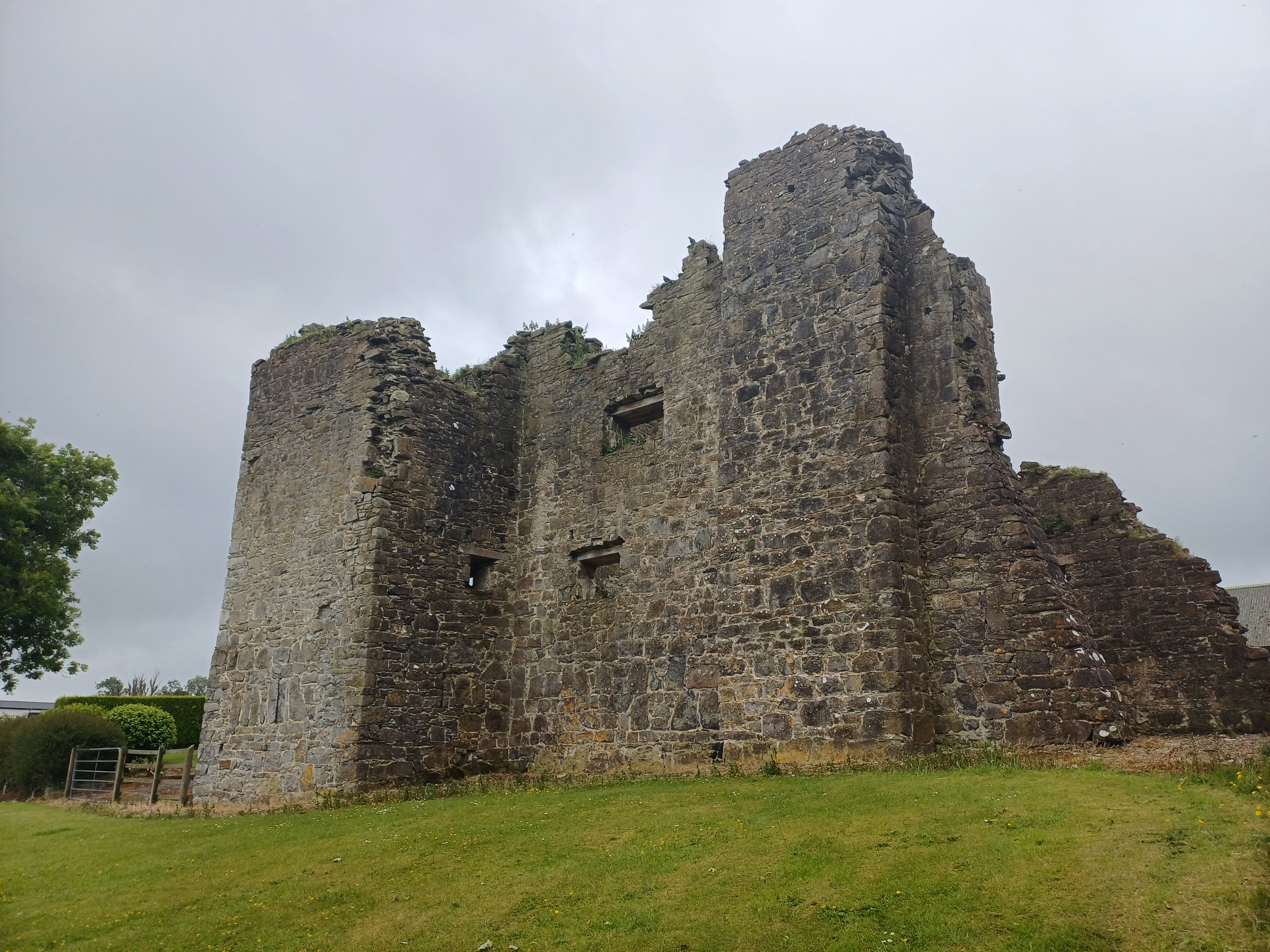
- The ruins of Crevenish Castle
- Interactive map of Crevenish Castle
- Type: Tower house
- Location: Near Kesh, County Fermanagh, Northern Ireland
- Nearest city: Derry

History
- Founder: Thomas Blenerhasset
- Built: c. 1618

Site notes
- Owner: Privately owned

Crevenish Castle is a ruined castle and bawn in County Fermanagh, Northern Ireland, 3k south-west of Kesh at grid ref: H165626. It is privately owned.

== History ==
The castle was built about 1618 by Thomas Blenerhasset (died 1624) of Norfolk, whose brother built Castle Caldwell. He was a writer, and published a pamphlet Directions for the Plantation of Ulster. He was succeeded by his eldest son Sir Leonard Blennerhassett (died 1639). The castle moved to local Maguire hands when his widow, Deborah, married Rory Maguire, a leader of the Irish Rebellion of 1641 in Fermanagh, who died in 1648. The castle subsequently returned to Blennerhassett hands, to Henry, son of Sir Leonard, who became MP for County Fermanagh in 1664, and High sheriff for the county. However, by 1697 the house was being reported as ruinous.

== Features ==
In 1618/19 Captain Nicholas Pynnar reported the castle as being 'a house of stone and lime, slated, two and a half storeys high'. A church was also begun and a small village of six houses. Two and a half storeys remain standing, with a square tower and loopholed windows. It is built of limestone with, on the north side, an inset centre section with a tower-like projection on either. The tombstones of the Blennerhassetts are in the grounds.

== See also ==
- List of castles in Northern Ireland
