= John McGuire =

John McGuire is the name of:

== Entertainment ==
- John McGuire (actor) (1910–1980), American actor
- John McGuire (businessman), Irish businessman and television presenter
- John McGuire (composer) (born 1942), American composer
- John J. McGuire (1917–1981), American author of science fiction
- John Allen McGuire (born 1985), guitarist for rock band July for Kings

== Politics ==
- John A. McGuire (1906–1976), U.S. Representative from Connecticut's 3rd district
- John McGuire (Virginia politician) (born 1968), U.S. Representative from Virginia's 5th district
- Jack McGuire (1933–2020), Illinois politician

== Sports ==
- Johnny McGuire (1893–1962), Scottish-American soccer player
- John McGuire (footballer) (1902–?), English footballer
- John McGuire (sportsman) (born 1954), Australian rules football player and cricketer

== See also ==
- John Maguire (disambiguation)
