= Emily Maguire =

Emily Maguire may refer to:

- Emily Maguire (singer) (born 1975), English singer-songwriter and musician
- Emily Maguire (writer) (born 1976), Australian writer
- Emily Maguire (field hockey), field hockey player
- Emily Maguire (politician) (1873–1961), New Zealand community worker, politician and feminist
