= Connor Roe Maguire (died 1625) =

Irish Gaelic chief (died 1625)

Connor Roe Maguire (Conchubhar Rua Mag Uidhir; died 25 December 1625) was an Irish Gaelic chief from Magherastephana, County Fermanagh, nicknamed the Queen's Maguire for supporting Elizabeth I's campaign in the Nine Years' War. Connor sought to displace his overlord kinsman Hugh Maguire as Lord of Fermanagh. Hugh took the rebels' side in the war, and Connor was granted the whole of Maguire's Country (Fermanagh) by letters patent in 1601, but this was disregarded by the Plantation of Ulster in 1609, which granted him only the barony of Magherastephana, rated at twelve thousand acres. His son Bryan Maguire was made Baron of Enniskillen in 1627.
