= Jack Maguire =

Jack Maguire may refer to:

- Jack Maguire (baseball) (1925–2001), American baseball player
- Jack Maguire (golfer) (born 1994), American professional golfer
