= John Borlase (1576–1648) =

English army officer and politician (1576-1648)

Sir John Borlase (1576–1648) was an English army officer and member of the Parliament of Ireland who was appointed joint Lord Justice of Ireland.

A member of the Borlase family born in 1576 in Cornwall, the eldest son of Edward Borlase of London, a mercer, and Suzannah Isham. Borlase was educated at King's College, Cambridge, where he matriculated in 1591. He was knighted at Greenwich in 1606.

Borlase served as a soldier in the Low Countries, taking part in the expedition to the Palatinate in 1620 under Sir Horace Vere to defend the Protestant cause. In 1633, he was appointed Master of the Ordnance in Ireland, jointly with Sir Thomas Lucas, a post he held until his death. He was elected to the Irish House of Commons for Enniskillen in 1634 and for Belturbet in 1639.

Following the recall to England of Lord Deputy of Ireland, Thomas Wentworth, 1st Earl of Strafford, Borlase and Sir William Parsons were appointed joint Lord Justices of Ireland in February 1641. As Wentworth's successors were either ill (Christopher Wandesford) or absent (Robert Sidney, 2nd Earl of Leicester) the two men were the virtual rulers of Ireland until their dismissal in 1644 when the Marquis of Ormonde took over as Lord Lieutenant. During their time in office, the two had to deal (somewhat ineffectively) with the major Irish insurgency of 1641.

Borlase died in London in 1648. He had married Alice Edwards in 1610. They had a son, Sir John Borlase, who lived and died in Ireland. A second son, Edmund, became a physician and historian in Chester.
