= Baron Maguire =

Baron Maguire, of Enniskillen, was a title in the Peerage of Ireland. It was created on 3 March 1628 for Bryan Maguire by Charles I. On 10 February 1645, the second baron was attainted and the barony forfeited.

In 1689, the second baron's nephew, Roger Maguire, was summoned to the Irish Patriot Parliament as Baron Maguire of Enniskillen by James II of England. However, this use of the title was never recognised outside Jacobite circles.

== Barons Maguire (1628) ==
- Bryan Maguire, 1st Baron Maguire (c. 1589–1633)
- Connor Maguire, 2nd Baron Maguire (c. 1612–1645)
- Heirs but for the attainder:
  - Rory Maguire (1619–1648)
  - Roger Maguire (1641–1708), titular 5th Baron
  - Philip Maguire, titular 6th Baron
  - Theophilus Maguire, titular 7th Baron
  - Alexander Maguire, titular 8th Baron
