= Enniskillen Castle =

Castle in County Fermanagh, Northern Ireland

- Enniskillen, County Fermanagh
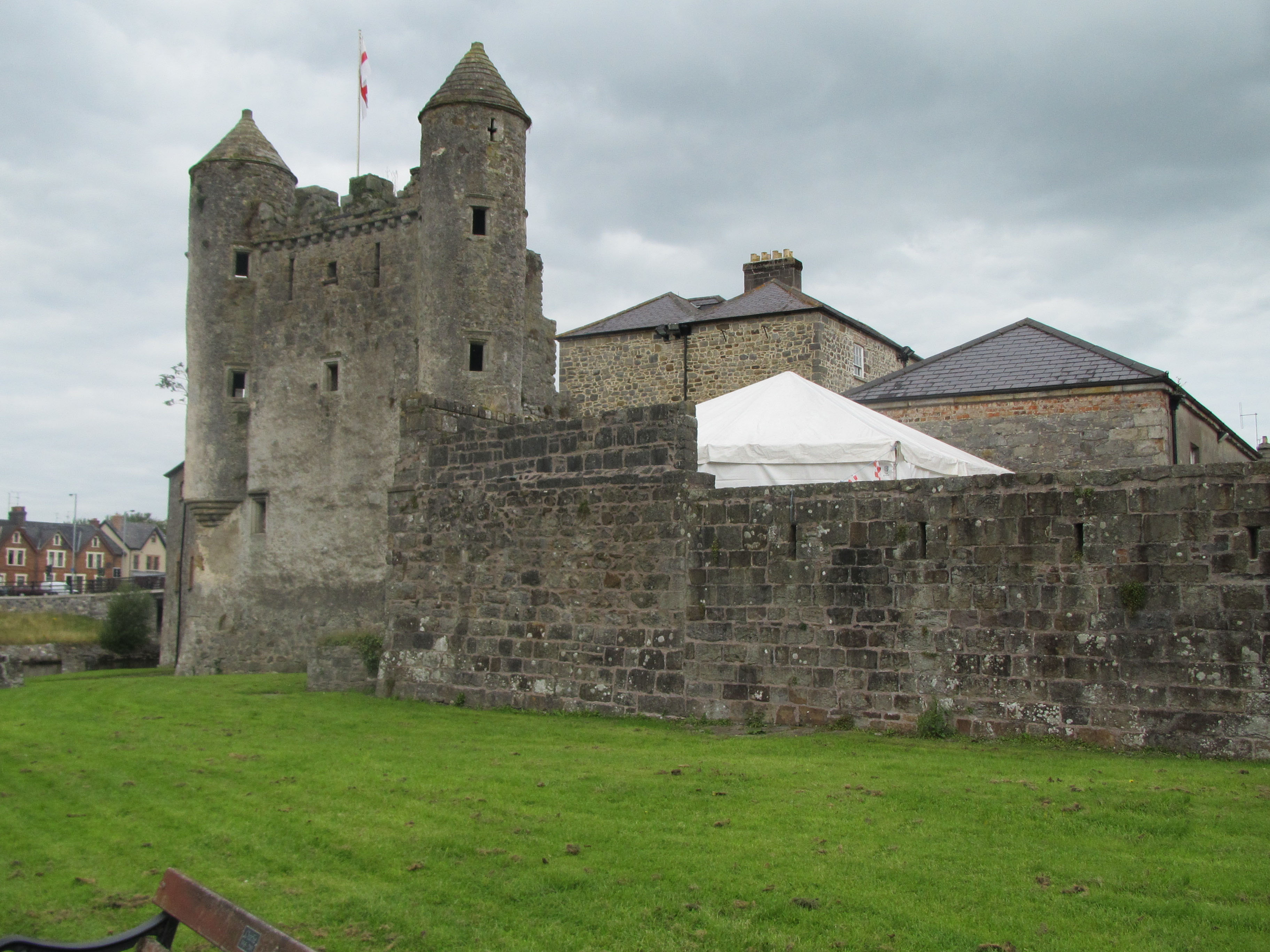
- Enniskillen Castle 2011

Site information
- Type: Castle
- Open to the public: Yes
- Website: www.enniskillencastle.co.uk

Location
- Shown within Northern Ireland
- Coordinates: 54°20′46″N 07°38′42″W

Site history
- Built: 1428; 598 years ago

Enniskillen Castle is situated in Enniskillen, County Fermanagh, Northern Ireland. It was originally built in the 16th century and now contains the Fermanagh County Museum and a museum for the 5th Royal Inniskilling Dragoon Guards and Royal Inniskilling Fusiliers.

== History ==
Hugh Maguire built a castle at Enniskillen in 1428. It was besieged by Captain John Dowdall's troops at the start of 1594 and fell on 2 February after a short siege, when the occupants were massacred after they surrendered. The castle was again under siege later that year but was relieved. The fortress finally fell to the Irish in 1595. The castle remained in Irish hands until it fell to the crown's Irish ally, Niall Garve O'Donnell in the summer of 1602. In 1607 Captain William Cole was given command of the castle. Cole remodelled and refurbished the castle adding the riverside tower at the south, known as the Watergate, in 1609. He purchased the castle outright in 1623. It was unsuccessfully besieged by Rory Maguire during the Irish Rebellion of 1641, during which it sheltered Protestant settlers.

The castle was remodelled as "Castle Barracks" as part of the response to a threat of a French invasion in 1796. Castle Barracks became the home of the 27th Regiment of Foot in 1853. The regiment moved to purpose-built facilities at St Lucia Barracks, Omagh in 1875 and evolved, after amalgamation, to become the Royal Inniskilling Fusiliers in 1881.

The barracks continued to be used by other regiments and, from November 1939, they became to home of the North Irish Horse, a Territorial Army unit. The barracks were decommissioned in 1950 and were converted for use as council depot. The castle was subsequently opened to the public as a heritage centre.

== Features and collections ==
The Castle consists of two sections, a central tower keep and a curtain wall which was strengthened with small turrets called Bartizans. The design of the castle has strong Scottish influences. This can be particularly seen in the Watergate, which features two corbelled circular tourelles which were built about 1609. It is a State Care Historic Monument.

The castle is now home to the Fermanagh County Museum, which focuses on the county's history, culture and natural history. Exhibits include the area's prehistory, natural history, traditional rural life, local crafts and Belleek Pottery, and history of the castle. It also contains information on the Maguire family. The castle also contains the Inniskillings Museum for the Royal Inniskilling Fusiliers and the 5th Royal Inniskilling Dragoon Guards.

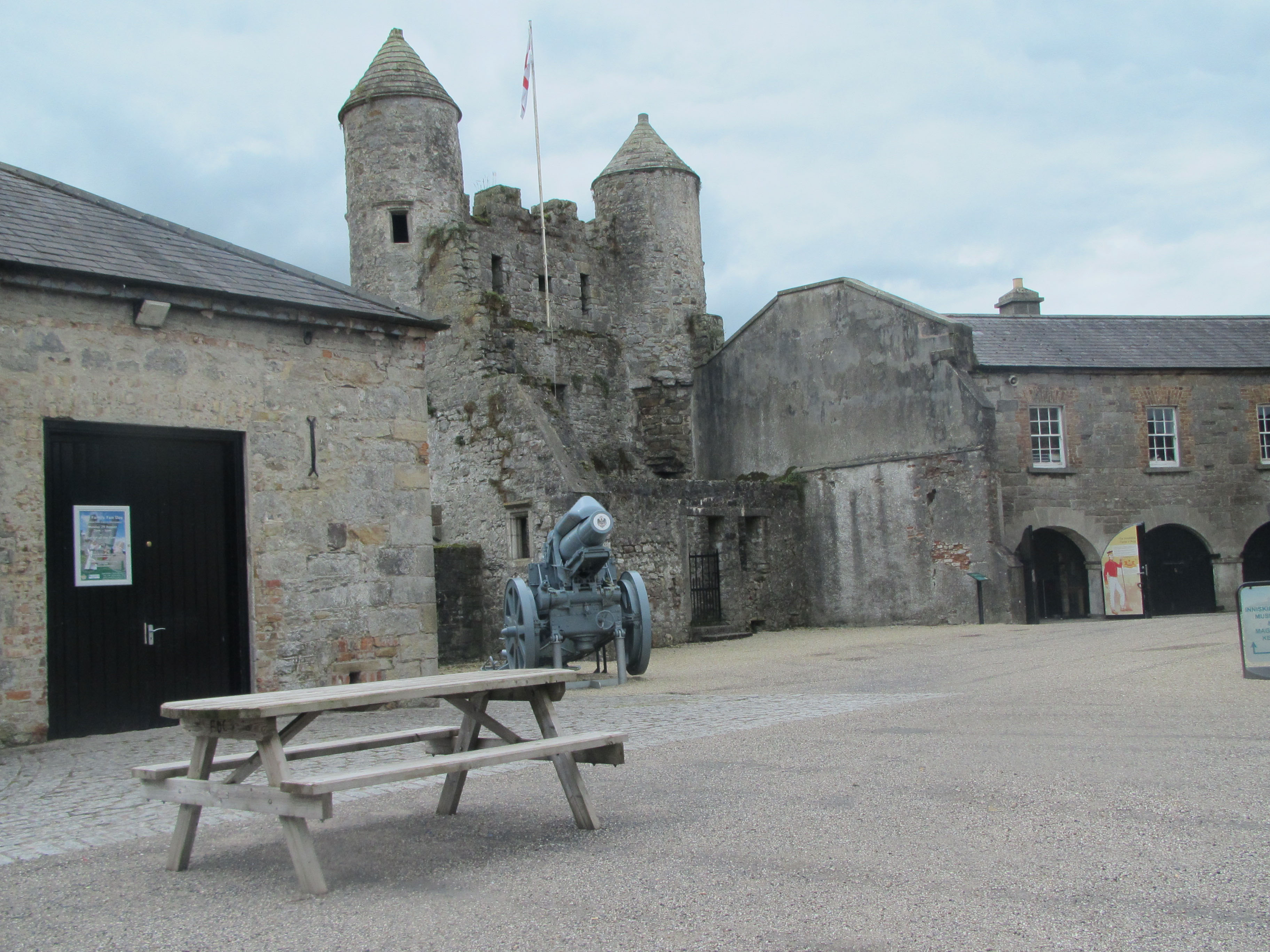
The courtyard of the Castle

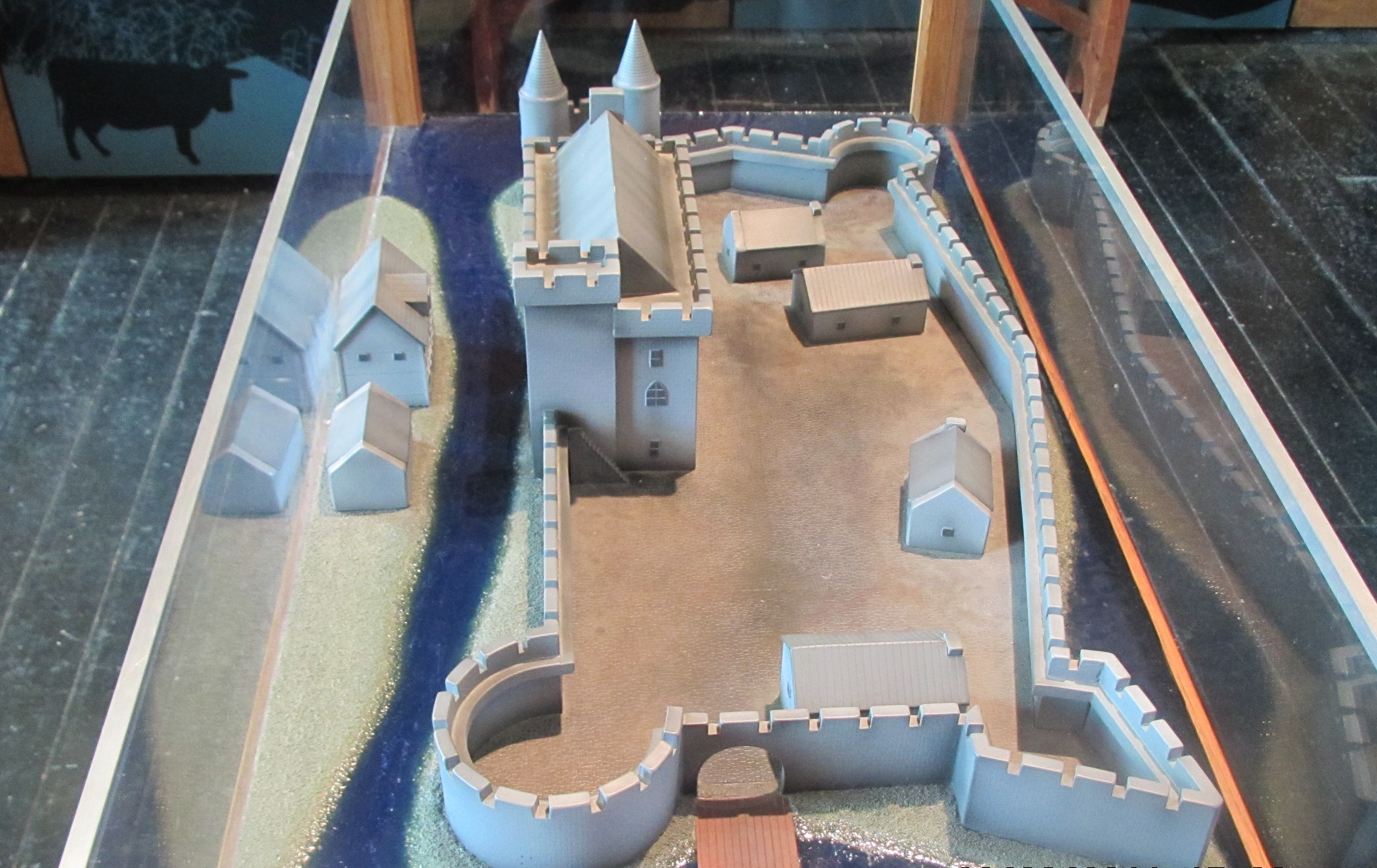
Reconstruction of the Castle

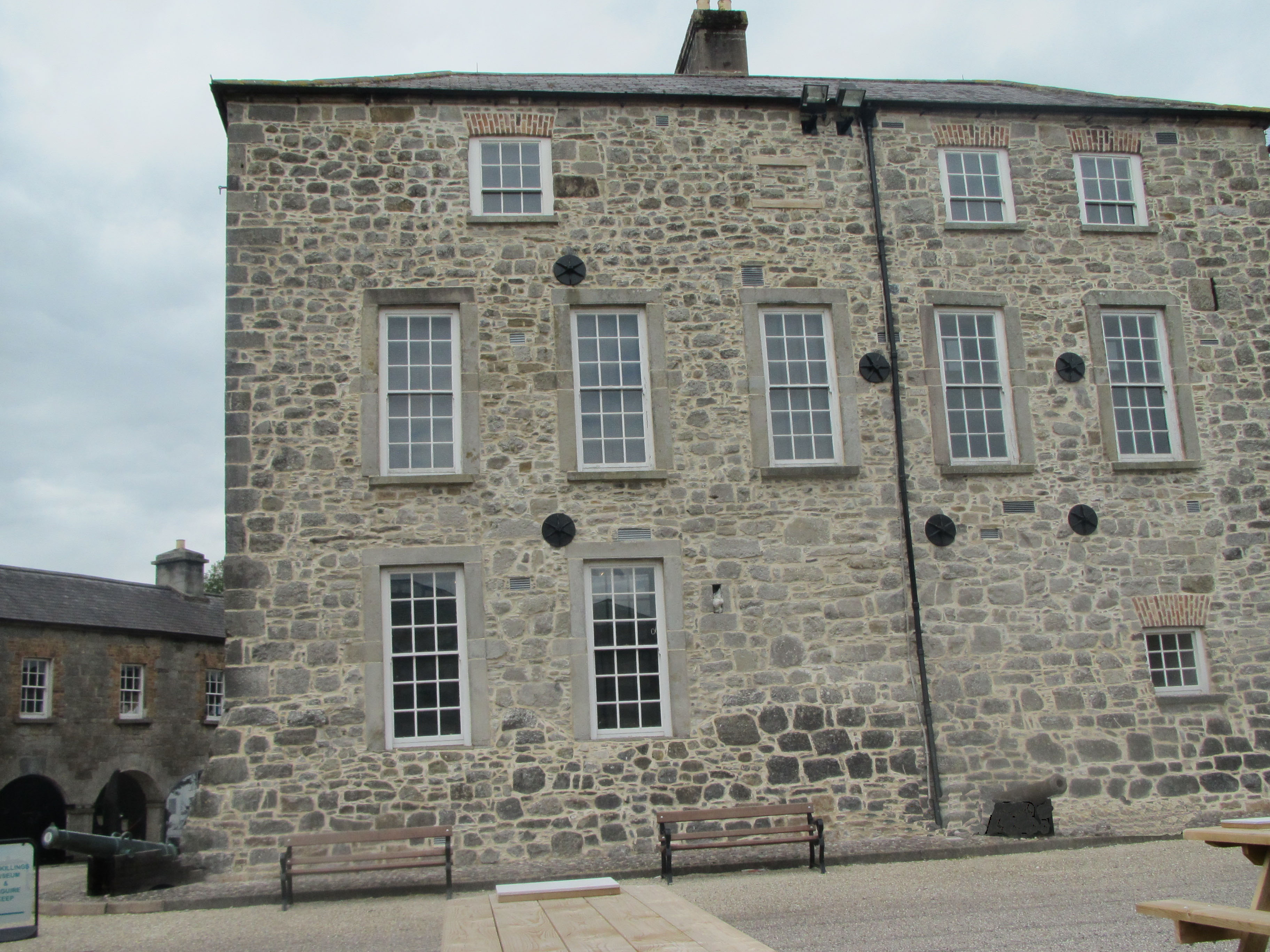
The barracks was built inside the walls

== See also ==
- Castles in Northern Ireland

== Sources ==
- Doherty, Richard (2002). The North Irish Horse, A Hundred Years of Service. Spellmount. ISBN 978-1862271906.
- James O'Neill, 'Threes sieges and two massacres: Enniskillen at the outbreak of the Nine Years War, 1593-5, The Irish Sword, xxx, no. 121 (2016), pp 241-9
