= Mick McGuire (footballer) =

English footballer

Personal information
- Full name: Michael James McGuire
- Date of birth: 4 September 1952 (age 74)
- Place of birth: Blackpool, England
- Height: 5 ft 7 in (1.70 m)
- Position: Midfielder

Senior career*
Years	Team	Apps	(Gls)
1971–1975	Coventry City	72	(1)
1975–1983	Norwich City	182	(11)
1978	→ Tampa Bay Rowdies (loan)	25	(2)
1983–1985	Barnsley	47	(6)
1985–1987	Oldham Athletic	69	(3)
1987–1991	Grantham Town	62	(3)
Total		457	(26)

International career
1971	England Youth	7	(0)
- * Club domestic league appearances and goals

Michael James McGuire (born 4 September 1952) is an English footballer who played as a midfielder in the Football League.

He attended Blackpool Grammar School where the main sport was rugby but he was able to play some football in the evenings. He came to the attention of Coventry City for whom he signed professional terms in November 1969. He almost moved to Norwich in an exchange deal for their striker David Cross in 1974 but in January 1975 he did make the move to Carrow Road. While on loan in the summer of 1978 to the Tampa Bay Rowdies of NASL, he helped the Rowdies to Soccer Bowl '78. Though McGuire started the final, by the 68th minute he was forced to withdraw due to a knee injury suffered four nights earlier in the semi-final against Ft. Lauderdale. He later returned to Norwich and had further transfers to Barnsley and Oldham Athletic before moving into work with the Professional Footballers Association. He also completed an Open University degree and played some non-league football for Grantham.

He is married to Sue and has two children, Sally and Alexander and a grandson, Wilf, who supports Acle Rangers.
