= Connor Maguire, 2nd Baron of Enniskillen =

Irish nobleman

- Born: 1616; County Fermanagh, Ireland
- Died: 1645 (aged 28–29); Tyburn, England
- Cause of death: Execution
- Occupations: Politician, soldier

Connor (or Cornelius) Maguire, 2nd Baron of Enniskillen (Irish: Conchobhar Mag Uidhir; 1616–1645) was an Irish nobleman from Ulster who took part in the Irish Rebellion of 1641. He was executed for high treason.

== Background ==
He was born in County Fermanagh, the son of Sir Bryan Maguire who was created a peer on account of the family loyalty to the English crown. The family was granted land in their traditional power base of Fermanagh by James I, as part of the Ulster Plantation. His mother was an O'Neill, which brought a connection to the leading family of Ulster. He is said to have been partly educated at Magdalen College, Oxford, but did not matriculate in the university.

His brother, Rory Maguire, married into a leading planter family, and sat for County Fermanagh in the 1640 Parliament.

== Politics ==
He succeeded to the peerage in 1634, and attended the parliament which met in Dublin on 10 March 1640. In Dublin, during the session in February 1641, he was recruited by rebel Rory O'Moore, who had conceived the plan of freeing Ireland while the English government was busy with Scotland.

== Rebellion ==
In August 1641 he first heard of the plan for seizing Dublin Castle; the chief hope of the conspirators rested on Colonel Owen Roe O'Neill, who served the king of Spain in the Low Countries. The rising was fixed for 23 October but Hugh Oge MacMahon disclosed the plot on the night of the 22nd. Roger More escaped, but Maguire was captured, with MacMahon and Colonel Reade (afterwards Sir John and gentleman of the bedchamber), who had served the king in Scotland. The two latter were racked, but Maguire admitted all the material facts without torture on 26 March 1642, and made a fuller voluntary statement some six months later.

== Trial and execution ==
In June 1642, Maguire, MacMahon, and Reade were moved to the Tower of London, and eleven months later they were transferred to Newgate Prison as close prisoners. In October 1643, Reade escaped when Maguire and MacMahon were sent back to the Tower. In August 1644, both prisoners escaped, but were retaken within six weeks. After many delays Maguire was brought to trial in the King's Bench before Justice Francis Bacon in February 1645. MacMahon had already been hanged.

The peerage in Maguire's case made a difficulty, he was a Peer of Ireland and requested a trial of his peers, he was refused this right by William Prynne Esq, "nor indulge him any tryal here or there by his Peers of Ireland (at least of Irish blood) for so horrid a Treason as this" ruling that his decision did not impact future trials of "English Blood" in Ireland. There were precedents for trying in England treasons committed in Ireland. Maguire was tried. Many points of law were raised, but he was sentenced to be hanged, drawn, and quartered. He was a Catholic, but was not allowed a priest, and executed at Tyburn.

== Family ==
Maguire married Mary, daughter of Thomas Fleming of Castle Fleming, Queen's County (now County Laois), by whom he had a son. The chieftainship of Fermanagh during the civil war fell to his brother Rory, who was killed in the winter of 1648. Descendants direct or collateral were long called Barons of Enniskillen in the service of France or of James II. The last titular lord was a retired captain of Lally's regiment at the outbreak of the revolution in 1789.

Maguire's brother Rory became a Colonel in the Ulster Army of Confederate Ireland and served until his death in a skirmish in 1648.

== Bibliography ==
- Kearney, Hugh. Strafford in Ireland. Cambridge University Press, 1989,
- Perceval-Maxwell, M. Outbreak of the Irish Rebellion of 1641. McGill-Queen's Press, 1994
- Robertson, Barry. Royalists at War in Scotland and Ireland, 1638–1650. Ashgate Publishing, 2014.

Peerage of Ireland
Preceded by Bryan Maguire	Baron of Enniskillen; 1633–1645	Extinct
