= Richard Jones, 1st Earl of Ranelagh =

Irish peer and politician

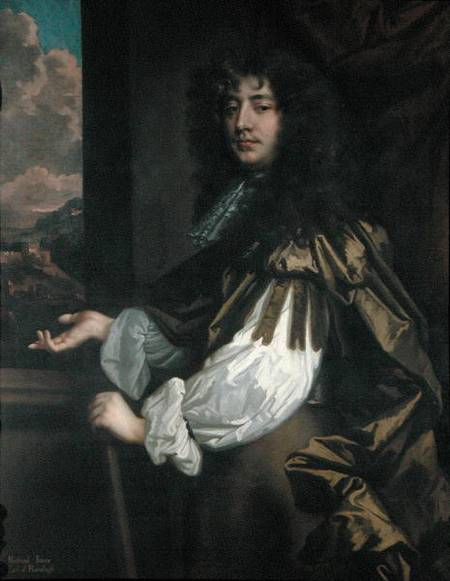
Portrait, oil on canvas, Richard Jones, 1st Earl of Ranelagh (1641–1712) by Sir Peter Lely (1618–1680)

Richard Jones, 1st Earl of Ranelagh, PC (Ire), FRS (8 February 1641 – 5 January 1712), known as The Viscount Ranelagh between 1669 and 1677, was an Irish peer, politician both in the Parliaments of England and Ireland.

== Background ==
He was born in Ireland the eldest son of Arthur Jones, 2nd Viscount Ranelagh and Katherine Boyle, daughter of the Earl of Cork who counted amongst her brothers the chemist Robert Boyle and Lord Broghill, the later Earl of Orrery who was a prominent politician in Cromwellian and Restoration times. Jones's mother was estranged from her husband who appears to have been a drunkard and Richard Jones was largely brought up in his mother's household in London.

Richard Jones undertook a Grand Tour in 1658 and included Basle

== Irish parliamentary career ==
Following the Restoration of Charles II he became a member of the Irish Parliament for Roscommon, and in 1668 was appointed to the Privy Council of Ireland. In the Irish parliament, Ranelagh was associated initially with the group which opposed the land settlement being proposed by Ormond, the then viceroy, but upon appointment to the government as chancellor of the exchequer (a relatively minor role), he became a strong supporter of Ormond's. He accompanied the new Viceroy, Berkeley on his trip to England in 1671 when Lord Aungier (later earl of Longford), the vice treasurer, presented a grim view of Irish finances and crown debts. Ranelagh seized this opportunity to reinterpret the situation as one where the crown, far from being indebted, could reap a profit from Ireland if it managed monies owing to the crown and the government finances differently. Ranelagh was granted an 'undertaking' whereby he and a partnership took on the crown debts and effectively 'privatised' the treasury. Ranelagh was rewarded personally with his earldom and the role of vice-treasurer of Ireland. Throughout the whole of Essex's vice-royalty from 1672 to 1677 Ranelagh wielded real influence on the Irish government from Whitehall developing a strong relationship with the Earl of Danby, the English Treasurer who was effectively Charles's first minister.

== English parliamentary career ==
When the undertaking finished in 1675 it was not renewed, but the Crown was now clear of all debts. Ranelagh ensured regular payments were made to the English Treasury, some of which paid for troops for Charles and some of which went to the renovation of Windsor Castle. This was largely achieved through short payment of the Irish army which was Ranelagh's training ground for his later embezzlements as Paymaster General to the English army. His skill, however, lay in his efficiency—for all his short payments the Irish army were in fact better paid than in the previous ill-managed regime. He ceased his involvement in Irish affairs in 1681 when the Irish treasury was handed over to a group of treasury commissioners.

Ranelagh remained closely associated with Danby after 1675, but when the latter fell from power he remained a loyalist to Charles and an associate of the Duchess of Portsmouth and of the Earl of Sunderland. He remained in royal favour during James IIs reign, but when William III and Mary II came to the throne he was able to transfer his loyalties and become a senior figure in the new regime (his old friend the Earl of Danby was one of the seven who signed the Invitation to William).

In 1670 he inherited his father's viscountcy, and in 1674 was created First Earl of Ranelagh. Both these peerages being in the Peerage of Ireland they did not disqualify him from sitting in the English House of Commons and in 1685 was elected as MP for Plymouth; in the same year he was appointed to the lucrative post of Paymaster of the Forces. He was subsequently member for Newtown (Isle of Wight), Chichester, Marlborough and West Looe, and was made a member of the English Privy Council in 1692.

Ranelagh was expelled from the Commons in 1703 when discrepancies were found in his accounts as Paymaster, and he was discovered to have appropriated more than £900,000 of public funds.

== Family and later life ==
Richard Jones lived as a youth with his father in his substantial house at Dame Street, Dublin.

Ranelagh died in 1712 and due to his lack of a legitimate male heir his earldom became extinct, and the viscountcy dormant. His son with Elizabeth, Edward Jones, styled Lord Navan, had died, age 3, on 29 March 1678.

== Architect ==
Richard Jones was a Gentleman architect. In 1670 he inspected the partly finished Phoenix House near Dublin.

In 1680, he was appointed one of the Commissioners for the building of the royal Hospital in Kilmainham, Dublin.

As Paymaster General of the army, he became Treasurer of the Royal Hospital, Chelsea, from 1685, and played an important role in the early phases of the building of Chelsea Hospital He designed the Treasurer's House, built 1688-1691.

In 1700, he was appointed 'Sur-intendant general of oure Buildings and of our works in our Parks,' which he held until 1702

In 1677, his mother decided to rebuild the house she shared with Robert Boyle at Pall Mall. Robert Hook the architect of the house consulted Richard jones on the works.

Richard Jones advised Lord Conway on William Hurlbutt's drawings for his country house at Ragley.

Richard Jones also advised Lord Conway on his house at Newmarket.

In 1704 he supervised the enlargement of 2nd. Duke of Ormonde's house at Richmond.

Richard Jones is best known for his own house, Ranelagh house, in Chelsea which was demolished in 1805. Its associated pleasure gardens were later transferred to the hospital and still bear his name.

Richard Jones also built a house for himself adjoining the Horse Guard in Whitehall

Richard Jones purchased, in 1700, a country estate near the Royal Court called Cranbourne Lodge, now in the Great Park at Windsor in Berkshire. It is known that he undertook improvements to the house. He was Ranger of Cranbourne Chase.

He founded Ranelagh School at nearby Cranbourne (since moved to Bracknell).

== Irish Properties ==
Richard Earl of Ranelagh owned very substantial properties in Co. Roscommon including the town of Roscommon.

He also owned tracts in Co.Dublin, Co. Meath and Co. Westmeath in the year 1704.

Peerage of Ireland
New creation	Earl of Ranelagh; 1677–1711	Extinct
Preceded by Arthur Jones	Viscount Ranelagh; 1669–1711	Dormant Title next held by Charles Jones
Political offices
Preceded by Robert Meredyth	Chancellor of the Exchequer of Ireland; 1668–1674	Succeeded by Charles Meredyth
