= List of shipwrecks in November 1850 =

The list of shipwrecks in November 1850 includes ships sunk, foundered, wrecked, grounded, or otherwise lost during November 1850.

== 1 November ==
List of shipwrecks: 1 November 1850
Ship	State	Description
Commodore	United Kingdom	The ship ran aground on the Black Rocks. She was on a voyage from Leith, Lothian to Glasgow, Renfrewshire. She was refloated and resumed her voyage.
Gulielmo	Spain	The ship was severely damaged by fire at Jersey, Channel Islands.
Jack Tar	United Kingdom	The ship ran aground on the Boulmer Rocks, on the coast of Northumberland. She was on a voyage from Hartlepool, County Durham to the River Spey. She was refloated and put in to South Shields, County Durham.
Peterhoff	Imperial Russian Navy	The steam yacht was driven ashore on Saaremaa.
St. Antonio	Greece	The brig was driven ashore in Dundrum Bay. Her crew survived. She was on a voyage from Cork to Troon, Ayrshire, United Kingdom.
Tom and John	United Kingdom	The ship ran aground at Castle Cornet, Guernsey, Channel Islands. She was on a voyage from London to Málaga, Spain.

== 2 November ==
List of shipwrecks: 2 November 1850
Ship	State	Description
Alpha	United Kingdom	The ship was wrecked on a reef north of Hogland, Russia with the loss of all hands.
Autoleon	Belgium	The ship was abandoned in the Atlantic Ocean. Her crew were rescued. She was on a voyage from New York, United States to Antwerp.
Columbus	Duchy of Holstein	The ship was driven ashore at Freiston, Lincolnshire, United Kingdom. She was refloated the next day and towed in to Boston, Lincolnshire.
Harriet	United Kingdom	The ship was driven ashore at the Punta del Faro, Sicily. Her crew were rescued. She was on a voyage from Naples, Kingdom of the Two Sicilies to a Black Sea port. She had become a wreck by 8 November.

== 3 November ==
List of shipwrecks: November 1850
Ship	State	Description
Bienfateur	France	The ship ran aground on the Goodwin Sands, Kent, United Kingdom. She was on a voyage from Sunderland, County Durham, United Kingdom to Nantes, Loure-Atlantique. She was refloated and taken in to Ramsgate, Kent in a leaky condition.
Caledonia	United Kingdom	The ship ran aground on the Barber Sand, in the North Sea off the coast of Norfolk.
Elizabeth	United Kingdom	The ship was in collision with Gazelle (United Kingdom) and foundered in the North Sea 12 nautical miles (22 km) off Cromer, Norfolk. Her crew were rescued. She was on a voyage from Sunderland to London.
Erie	Bremen	The ship was wrecked at the mouth of the Weser. Her crew were rescued. She was on a voyage from New York, United States to Bremen.
Escape	United Kingdom	The brig ran aground on the Shipwash Sand, in the North Sea off the coast of Essex. She was on a voyage from South Shields, County Durham to Cartagena, Spain. She was refloated the next day and taken in to Lowestoft, Suffolk in a leaky condition.
John and Eliza	United Kingdom	The ship ran aground and was damaged at Fleetwood, Lancashire.
Kitty Cordes	United States	The ship ran aground on the Florida Reef and was damaged. She was on a voyage from Mobile, Alabama to Liverpool, Lancashire. She was refloated and put in to Key West, Florida in a leaky condition.
Orion	United Kingdom	The ship was wrecked near "Stette", Denmark. Her crew were rescued. She was on a voyage from London to Christianstad, Sweden.
Rover	United Kingdom	The ship ran aground at Scotstown Head, Aberdeenshire. She was on a voyage from Hartlepool, County Durham to Dingwall, Ross-shire.
Three Sisters	United Kingdom	The ship ran aground on the Shag Ledges. She was on a voyage from Boston, Massachusetts, United States to Miramichi, New Brunswick, British North America. She was refloated and taken in to Popes Harbour, Nova Scotia, British North America.

== 4 November ==
List of shipwrecks: 4 November 1850
Ship	State	Description
Haabets Anker	Norway	The ship was driven ashore and wrecked at Kirkwall, Orkney Islands, United Kingdom. She was on a voyage from Liverpool, Lancashire, United Kingdom to Christiania.
Henriette	Kingdom of Hanover	The schooner was driven ashore between Schmolsin and "Dambo", Prussia with the loss of all hands. She was on a voyage from Brake to Stettin.
Hiram	United Kingdom	The ship struck a sunken rock off Syros, Greece and foundered. Her crew were rescued. She was on a voyage from Çeşme, Ottoman Empire to London.
Kitty Cordes	United States	The ship ran aground on the Florida Reef. She was on a voyage from Mobile, Alabama to Liverpool, Lancashire, United Kingdom. She was refloated on 13 November and put in to Charleston, South Carolina in a leaky condition.
Plover	United Kingdom	The ship departed from South Shields for London. Presumed foundered with the loss of all hands as was subsequently sighted in a sinking condition.

== 5 November ==
List of shipwrecks: 5 November 1850
Ship	State	Description
Goethe	Danzig	The ship was wrecked on the Patemoski's Reef, off the coast of Sweden with the loss of all but three of her crew. She was on a voyage from London, United Kingdom to Danzig.
Schwan	Stolp	The ship capsized and sank off Falster, Denmark with the loss of all but one of her crew. She was on a voyage from Hartlepool, County Durham, United Kingdom to Swinemünde, Prussia.
Uladen	Austrian Empire	The brig was driven ashore in Whitesands Bay with the loss of a crew member. She had become a wreck by 21 November.

== 6 November ==
List of shipwrecks: 6 November 1850
Ship	State	Description
Adelaide	United Kingdom	The ship was driven ashore and wrecked at Memel, Prussia. Her crew were rescued.
Alexandrine	Lübeck	The ship was driven ashore near "Baltic Port". She was on a voyage from Kronstadt, Russia to Lübeck.
Augusta	Sweden	The ship was wrecked on a reef off Gotland with the loss of two of her six crew. She was on a voyage from Riga, Russia to Karlskrona.
Barbara	United Kingdom	The ship ran aground and was wrecked off "Tem". Her crew were rescued. She was on a voyage from "Wyburg" to London.
Dice	Grand Duchy of Mecklenburg-Schwerin	The ship was driven ashore on "Ruberg", Denmark. Her crew were rescued.
Donegal	United Kingdom	The brig was in collision with a barque and foundered in the English Channel 10 nautical miles (19 km) off Folkestone, Kent. Her crew were rescued by Robert and Anne (United Kingdom). She was on a voyage from Middlesbrough, Yorkshire to Exeter, Devon
Helen	United Kingdom	The ship sprang a leak and sank in the North Sea off Coquet Island, Northumberland. Her crew were rescued. She was on a voyage from Garliestown, Wigtownshire to Hamburg.
Lewis	United Kingdom	The sloop foundered off Howth, County Dublin. Both crew were rescued.
Lima	United Kingdom	The brig was driven ashore and wrecked at Memel, Prussia with loss of life. She was on a voyage from London to Memel.
Resolution	United Kingdom	The ship foundered whilst on a voyage from Port Eynon to Aberavon, Glamorgan.
Rose	United Kingdom	The ship was driven ashore and then holed by ice at Arkhangelsk, Russia.
Sapphiras	Hamburg	The ship ran aground off Hörnum, Duchy of Holstein. Her crew were rescued. She was on a voyage from Hartlepool, County Durham, United Kingdom to Hamburg.

== 7 November ==
List of shipwrecks: 7 November 1850
Ship	State	Description
Adelaide Victoria	(United Kingdom of Great Britain and Ireland) British North America	The ship was wrecked on Miscou Island, New Brunswick. She was on a voyage from Saint John's, Newfoundland to Quebec City, Province of Canada.
Brothers	United Kingdom	The ship was driven ashore and severely damaged on Unst, Shetland Islands.
Cleveland	United Kingdom	The ship was driven ashore and damaged at Claughton Wyke, Yorkshire. She was on a voyage from Hull, Yorkshire to Newcastle upon Tyne, Northumberland. She was refloated and taken in to Scarborough, Yorkshire.
Equator	Kingdom of Hanover	The koff was driven ashore on "Hearm Island", Sweden. Her crew were rescued.
Fox	United Kingdom	The sloop was driven ashore at Lindisfarne, Northumberland. She was on a voyage from Bridgeness, Lothian to Newcastle upon Tyne. She was refloated the next day.
Helen and George	United Kingdom	The schooner was driven ashore in Filey Bay. She was on a voyage from Hull to Middlesbrough, Yorkshire. She was refloated and beached at Scarborough, being leaky.
Isabella	United Kingdom	The ship foundered 35 nautical miles (65 km) north of "Marittima", Sicily. Her crew were rescued. She was on a voyage from Agrigento, Sicily to London.
Munro	United Kingdom	The ship ran aground on the Fahrtudd Reef, in the Baltic Sea south east of Gotland, Sweden. She was on a voyage from Saint Petersburg, Russia to Helsingør, Denmark.
Progress	United Kingdom	The ship was driven ashore and wrecked at the mouth off the Meuse (Dutch: Maas). Her crew were rescued.
Rajah	United Kingdom	The ship ran aground in the Hooghly River and was damaged. She was on a voyage from Calcutta, India to Liverpool. She was refloated and put back to Calcutta.
Tamer	United Kingdom	The ship was driven ashore in Moville Bay, County Londonderry. She was on a voyage from Londonderry to Liverpool. She was refloated.
Tecumseh	United Kingdom	The ship ran aground in the River Tyne. She was on a voyage from the River Tyne to Almería, Spain.
Thomas and Mary	United Kingdom	The smack was driven ashore in Downing's Bay, County Donegal. She was on a voyage from Glasgow, Renfrewshire to Ballyness, County Donegal. She had been refloated by 24 November and taken in to Dunfanaghy, County Donegal.
Tiger	United Kingdom	The ship was driven ashore at Ardrossan, Ayrshire.
William and Lucy	United Kingdom	The sloop collided with Devon (United Kingdom) in the English Channel 20 nautical miles (37 km) off Beachy Head, Sussex and was abandoned. Her crew were rescued by Devon. William and Lucy was on a voyage from Fécamp, Seine-Inférieure, France to London. She was taken in to Boulogne, Pas-de-Calais, France in a waterlogged condition on 10 November.
Wyborg Packet	Russia	The ship was driven ashore and wrecked north of Helsingborg, Sweden. She was on a voyage from Vyborg to London.

== 8 November ==
List of shipwrecks: 8 November 1850
Ship	State	Description
Affina Gardina	Netherlands	The ship ran aground and was wrecked off Rügen, Prussia. Her crew were rescued. She was on a voyage from an English port to Stettin.
Ann Mitchell	United Kingdom	The full-rigged ship ran aground on the Kentish Knock. She was on a voyage from South Shields, County Durham to Bombay, India. She was refloated with assistance from Maid of Kent (United Kingdom) and taken in to The Downs.
Camilla	United Kingdom	The ship ran aground off Scharhörn. Her crew were rescued by a Dutch koff. She was on a voyage from Sunderland, County Durham to Hamburg.
Ellida	Sweden	The ship ran aground and was wrecked at the entrance to Beviksfjord. She was on a voyage from Luleå to Landskrona.
Heinrich	Kingdom of Hanover	The ship was driven ashore at Thisted, Denmark. She was on a voyage from Saint Petersburg, Russia to Antwerp, Belgium.
Moselle	United Kingdom	The barque ran aground in Manila Bay. She was on a voyage from Sydney, New South Wales to Manila, Spanish East Indies. She was refloated.
Southampton	(United Kingdom of Great Britain and Ireland) British North America	The ship was driven ashore and wrecked on Devil's Island, Nova Scotia. She was on a voyage from Montreal, Province of Canada to Halifax, Nova Scotia.
Twe Geschwester	Kingdom of Hanover	The ship was driven ashore near "Aargab", Denmark. She was on a voyage from Königsberg, Prussia to London, United Kingdom.

== 9 November ==
List of shipwrecks: 9 November 1850
Ship	State	Description
Bure	United Kingdom	The brig ran aground on the Pye Sand, in the North Sea off the coast of Suffolk. She was refloated with assistance from Saucy Lass and Tryal (both United Kingdom).
Enigheten	Sweden	The ship capsized off "Herno Klubb". Her crew were rescued.
Enriquete	Spain	The schooner capsized at Millbay, Plymouth, Devon, United Kingdom.
Grove	United Kingdom	The ship was driven ashore on Sylt, Duchy of Holstein. Her crew were rescued. She was on a voyage from Stettin to London. She had become a wreck by 18 November.
Liffey	United Kingdom	The schooner ran aground on the Girdler Sand, in the North Sea off the coast of Kent. She was refloated and resumed her voyage.
Mary Ann	United Kingdom	The ship was driven ashore in the Nissum Fjord. Her crew were rescued. She was on a voyage from London to Råholmen, Sweden.
Neptunus	Denmark	The ship was wrecked near Trondheim, Norway.
Thomas Baring	United Kingdom	The ship collided with the brig Gazelle (United Kingdom) in the North Sea off the coast of Norfolk and was abandoned. Her crew were rescued by Gazelle. Thomas Baring was on a voyage from Newcastle upon Tyne, Northumberland to Great Yarmouth, Norfolk.
Wohlfahrt	Flag unknown	The ship was driven ashore south of Wijk aan Zee, North Holland, Netherlands. Her crew were rescued. She was on a voyage from Abbeville, Somme, France to Sunderland, County Durham, United Kingdom.

== 10 November ==
List of shipwrecks: 10 November 1850
Ship	State	Description
Argyle	United Kingdom	The ship ran aground on the Sandhammeren, in the Baltic Sea. She was on a voyage from Great Yarmouth, Norfolk to Danzig.
Elizabeth	Kingdom of Hanover	The koff was driven ashore at Sahlenburg. She was on a voyage from Harburg to Papenburg.
Graziata	Trieste	The barque was wrecked on the Florida Reef. She was on a voyage from New Orleans, Louisiana, United States to Trieste.
Marie	France	The ship was driven ashore near Egmond aan Zee, North Holland, Netherlands. She was on a voyage from Sunderland, County Durham, United Kingdom to La Rochelle, Charente-Maritime.
Two Brothers	United Kingdom	The ship ran aground off Eierland, North Holland. She was on a voyage from London to Groningen, Netherlands. She was refloated and taken in to Texel, North Holland in a leaky condition.
Unicorn	United Kingdom	The brig was abandoned in the Atlantic Ocean. Her crew were rescued . She was on a voyage from Philadelphia, Pennsylvania, United states to Londonderry.

== 11 November ==
List of shipwrecks: 11 November 1850
Ship	State	Description
Active	United Kingdom	The brig sprang a leak and foundered in the North Sea 3 nautical miles (5.6 km) off Scarborough, Yorkshire. Her crew were rescued. She was on a voyage from Sunderland, County Durham to London.
Agnes	United Kingdom	The ship was driven ashore and wrecked at Jaffa, Ottoman Syria. Her crew were rescued.
RMS America	United Kingdom	The steamship ran aground on the west coast of Ireland.
Courier	United Kingdom	The ship was driven ashore at Jaffa. Her crew survived.
Golden Eagle	United Kingdom	The brig was wrecked on the Haaks Bank, in the North Sea off the Dutch coast with the loss of all hands. She was on a voyage from Bahia, Brazil to Hamburg.
Guadeloupe	Flag unknown	The ship was wrecked on the Haaks Bank with the loss of all but two of her crew. She was on a voyage from Havana, Cuba to Hamburg.
Isabella Harley	United Kingdom	The schooner was driven ashore on Sylt, Duchy of Holstein. Her crew were rescued. She was on a voyage from Wismar to Harwich, Essex. Isabella Harley had become a wreck by 18 November.
Jahde	Kingdom of Hanover	The ship ran aground and was wrecked on the Westertill, in the North Sea. Her crew were rescued. She was on a voyage from Newcastle upon Tyne, Northumberland, United Kingdom to Brake.
Josephine	(flag) France	The schooner was wrecked at "Nyminde", Denmark. She was on a voyage from Rouen, Seine-Inférieure to Saint Petersburg, Russia.
Mercurius	Hamburg	The ship was driven ashore near "Ording", Duchy of Holstei. Her crew were rescued. She was on a voyage from Bordeaux, Gironde, France to Hamburg.
Royal Union	United Kingdom	The ship ran aground on the Aalot Bank, off Walcheren, Zeeland, Netherlands.
Soundraporvy	United Kingdom	The ship was driven ashore at Jaffa. Her crew survived.

== 12 November ==
List of shipwrecks: 12 November 1850
Ship	State	Description
Caroline	Russia	The ship was wrecked on Hiiumaa. She was on a voyage from Saint Petersburg to Liepāja.
Fanny	United Kingdom	The ship capsized and sank at Newport, Monmouthshire. She was refloated on 16 November.
Pomona	Spain	The ship was driven ashore on Eierland, North Holland, Netherlands. She was on a voyage from Bilbao to Hamburg. She was refloated on 22 November and taken in to Texel, North Holland.
Westmoreland	United Kingdom	The ship ran aground and was severely damaged on the Long Sand, in the Lynn Deeps off the coast of Norfolk. She was on a voyage from Quebec City, Province of Canada, British North America to Wisbech, Cambridgeshire. She was refloated and towed in to Wisbech, where she arrived on 15 November.
William	Prussia	The ship was driven ashore near Rügenwalde. She was on a voyage from Memel to London, United Kingdom. She was declared a total loss.
Zephyrus	United Kingdom	The ship was wrecked on Sylt, Duchy of Holstein. She was on a voyage from Stockton-on-Tees, County Durham to Hamburg.

== 13 November ==
List of shipwrecks: 13 November 1850
Ship	State	Description
Active	Sweden	The ship ran aground and was damaged at Cardiff, Glamorgan, United Kingdom. She was on a voyage form Cardiff to Malta. She was refloated and beached. Active was consequently condemned.
Argent	United Kingdom	The ship ran aground at South Shields, County Durham. She was on a voyage from Liverpool, Lancashire to South Shields. She was refloated and taken in to South Shields in a leaky condition.
Brazilian	United States	The ship was wrecked on the Colorado Reefs, off the coast of Cuba. She was on a voyage from Galveston, Texas to Havana, Cuba.
Friends	United Kingdom	The ship sprang a leak and sank in the North Sea 20 nautical miles (37 km) south east of Spurn Point, Yorkshire. Her crew were rescued by Rudulph (Hamburg). Friends was on a voyage from Newcastle upon Tyne, Northumberland to Maldon, Essex.
Helene	Stettin	The ship was wrecked near "Ostdrevenow". Her crew were rescued. She was on a voyage from Stockton-on-Tees, County Durham to Stettin.
Mohawk	United Kingdom	The barque was driven ashore near Freiburg, Kingdom of Hanover.
Pezodi Regoa	United Kingdom	The ship departed from Birkenhead, Cheshire for the Charente. No further trace, presumed foundered with the loss of all hands.
Thetis	United Kingdom	The schooner capsized off Alderney, Channel Islands. She was towed in to Guernsey, Channel Islands and was righted.
Victor	United Kingdom	The ship departed from Liverpool for Baltimore, Maryland, United States. No further trace, presumed foundered with the loss of all on board.
Victoria	(Russian Empire) Grand Duchy of Finland	The ship was wrecked on "Nargol". Her crew were rescued.

== 14 November ==
List of shipwrecks: 14 November 1850
Ship	State	Description
Carnatic	United Kingdom	The ship was driven ashore north of "Ship Bar", United States. She was on a voyage from Liverpool, Lancashire to Charleston, South Carolina, United States. She was refloated and resumed her voyage.
Coromandel	United Kingdom	The ship ran aground at Bangor, County Down. She was on a voyage from Bangor to Dublin.
Edward and Mary	United Kingdom	The ship ran aground on the Barber Sand, in the North Sea off the coast of Norfolk. She was on a voyage from Frederikshavn, Denmark to Newcastle upon Tyne, Northumberland. She was refloated and taken in to Great Yarmouth, Norfolk in a leaky condition.
Othello	Sweden	The ship was wrecked on a reef north east of Gotland. Her crew were rescued. she was on a voyage from Söderhamn to Riga, Russia.
Sarah Ann	United Kingdom	The ship ran aground at Bangor, County Down. She was on a voyage from Bangor to Newry, County Antrim.
Strabane	United Kingdom	The full-rigged ship ran aground on the Blackwater Bank, in the Irish Sea off the coast of County Wexford, and sank. Her crew were rescued. She was on a voyage from the Clyde to Aden and Bombay, India.

== 15 November ==
List of shipwrecks: 15 November 1850
Ship	State	Description
Adeline	United States	The barque was wrecked on the Blackwater Bank, in the Irish Sea off the coast of County Wexford, United Kingdom. All on board were rescued. She was on a voyage from Liverpool, Lancashire, United Kingdom to New Orleans, Louisiana.
Agnes	United Kingdom	The schooner was wrecked on Inishtrahull, County Donegal. She was on a voyage from Glasgow, Renfrewshire to Sligo.
Magnolia	United Kingdom	The brig was driven ashore and wrecked at Wexford. Her crew were rescued. She was on a voyage from Liverpool to Constantinople, Ottoman Empire. She was refloated the next day.
Milford Packet	United Kingdom	The ship was driven ashore north of Barmouth, Caernarfonshire. She was on a voyage from Cardiff, Glamorgan to Liverpool. She was refloated on 17 November and taken in to Barmouth.
Runnymede	United Kingdom	The ship ran aground on the Blackwater Banks, in the Irish Sea off the coast of Ireland. She was on a voyage from Liverpool to Demerara, British Guiana. She was refloated on 18 November and put in to the Belfast Lough. She was taken in to Belfast, County Antrim for repairs.

== 16 November ==
List of shipwrecks: 16 November 1850
Ship	State	Description
Fame	United Kingdom	The ship ran aground and sank in the River Cree.
Henry and Ann	United Kingdom	The ship ran aground at Carlisle Point, County Cork. All on board were rescued. She was on a voyage from Queenstown, County Cork to Limerick. She had broken up by 2 December.
Minerva	United Kingdom	The schooner ran aground and was severely damaged at Exmouth, Devon. She was refloated and taken in to Exmouth.
Richard Hicks	United Kingdom	The schooner collided with the barque Eleonora or Leonora (United Kingdom) and foundered in the Irish Sea 7 nautical miles (13 km) off Holyhead, Anglesey. Her crew were rescued by the barque.
Triphena	Kingdom of the Two Sicilies	The ship was driven ashore at "Porto Furo", Sardinia. She was on a voyage from Civita Vecchia to Falmouth, Cornwall, United Kingdom.

== 17 November ==
List of shipwrecks: 17 November 1850
Ship	State	Description
Bessy Robertson	United Kingdom	The brig was driven ashore at Buenos Aires, Argentina. she was declared a total loss.
Flirt	United Kingdom	The ship ran aground on the Arklow Bank, in the Irish Sea off the coast of County Wicklow. She was on a voyage from Liverpool, Lancashire to Constantinople, Ottoman Empire. She was refloated and put back to Liverpool in a leaky condition.
Hinrika	Netherlands	The ship was wrecked off Norderney, Kingdom of Hanover with the loss of all but one of her crew. She was on a voyage from Newcastle upon Tyne, Northumberland, United Kingdom to Rotterdam, South Holland.
Laurel	United Kingdom	The ship was driven ashore west of Wells-next-the-Sea, Norfolk. She was refloated the next day and taken in to Wells-next-the-Sea.
Quiz	(United Kingdom of Great Britain and Ireland) Jersey	The ship was driven ashore east of Wells-next-the-Sea. She was refloated the next day and taken in to Wells-next-the-Sea.
Red Rose, or Red Rover	United Kingdom	The barque ran aground on the Arklow Bank. She was on a voyage from Liverpool to Charleston, South Carolina, United States. She was refloated and put in to Kingstown, County Dublin.

== 18 November ==
List of shipwrecks: 18 November 1850
Ship	State	Description
Emelie Marie	France	The chasse-marée was wrecked at Trevose Head, Cornwall, United Kingdom with the loss of four of her six crew. She was on a voyage from Liverpool, Lancashire, United Kingdom to Bordeaux, Gironde.
Patriot	United Kingdom	The ship was driven ashore at Suedia, Ottoman Empire. She was on a voyage from Beyrout to Suedia. She was consequently condemned.
Wilton	United Kingdom	The ship departed from Glasgow, Renfrewshire for Liverpool. No further trace, presumed foundered with the loss of all hands.

== 19 November ==
List of shipwrecks: 19 November 1850
Ship	State	Description
Edmond	(United Kingdom of Great Britain and Ireland) British North America	The passenger ship, a three-masted barque, was driven ashore and wrecked at Kilkee, County Clare, United Kingdom with the loss of 98 of the 216 people on board. Edmond was on a voyage from Limerick, United Kingdom to Quebec City, Province of Canada .
Elizabeth Hogan	United Kingdom	The ship was beached at Newport, Pembrokeshire. She was on a voyage from Pentewan, Cornwall to Runcorn, Cheshire.
Ella	United Kingdom	The ship ran aground on the New Patch, in the Bristol Channel and was abandoned by her crew. She was on a voyage from Swansea, Glamorgan to Cork. She floated off and was beached near Amroth, Pembrokeshire, where she was wrecked.
Errichetta	Kingdom of the Two Sicilies	The ship was wrecked off Dingle, County Kerry, United Kingdom with the loss of a crew member. She was on a voyage from Barletta to Falmouth, Cornwall and Limerick.
Fair Arcadian	United Kingdom	The ship was driven ashore and damaged at Hartlepool, County Durham.
Fame	United Kingdom	The ship was driven ashore in the River Eden, Fife. Her crew were rescued. She was on a voyage from the River Eden to Dundee, Forfarshire.
Fanny	United Kingdom	The ship was lost in Lannion Bay, Finistère, France. Her crew were rescued. She was on a voyage from Cardiff, Glamorgan to Brest, Finistère.
Hope	United Kingdom	The ship was driven ashore on Chiloé Island, Chile. Her crew were rescued. She was on a voyage from Newcastle upon Tyne, Northumberland to a port in Panama. Hope had been refloated by 24 December and taken in to Achao for temporary repairs. It was intended to take her to Santiago for permanent repairs.
Johanna Rebecca	Prussia	The ship was driven ashore and wrecked near Tibersted, Denmark. Her crew were rescued. She was on a voyage from Königsberg to Antwerp, Belgium.
Joseph	United Kingdom	The flat was driven ashore near Rossall, Lancashire. She was on a voyage from Preston, Lancashire to Amlwch, Anglesey.
Maria	United Kingdom	The brigantine was driven ashore and scuttled at Milford Haven, Pembrokeshire. She was on a voyage from Milford Haven to Queenstown, County Cork.
Mary Jones	United Kingdom	The ship was driven ashore 2 nautical miles (3.7 km) west of Pwllheli, Caernarfonshire. She was on a voyage from Barrow in Furness, Lancashire to Newcastle upon Tyne.
Mavis	United Kingdom	The ship was driven ashore and wrecked in St. Bride's Bay. Her crew were rescued.
Nancy	United Kingdom	The sloop was wrecked near Stonehaven, Aberdeenshire. She was on a voyage from Hopeman, Moray to Hamburg.
Princess Carolina Maria	Flag unknown	The brig was driven ashore at Moyne, County Wicklow, United Kingdom.
Rachael	United Kingdom	The sloop was driven ashore and wrecked at Dundee, Forfarshire. Her crew were rescued. She was on a voyage from Dundee to Alloa, Clackmannanshire.
Rosita	Spain	The ship was wrecked at Viana do Castelo, Portugal. Her crew were rescued. She was on a voyage from Matanzas, Cuba to A Coruña.
Unica Rosa	Spain	The ship foundered "at the entrance of Aldun, Galicia". Her crew were rescued.
Victoria	United Kingdom	The schooner was driven ashore at Abergele, Denbighshire. Her crew were rescued.

== 20 November ==
List of shipwrecks: 20 November 1850
Ship	State	Description
Abigail	United Kingdom	The ship was driven ashore at Rye, Sussex. She was on a voyage from Glasgow, Renfrewshire to Rye.
Arvania	United Kingdom	The ship was driven ashore and wrecked at Saddle Point, Pembrokeshire. Her crew were rescued. She was on a voyage from London to Waterford.
Bathurst	United Kingdom	The ship was driven ashore at Dungarvan, County Waterford.
Briton	United Kingdom	The barque ran aground and was wrecked off Bude, Cornwall. Her twelve crew were rescued by Manby Mortar. She was on a voyage from Quebec City, Province of Canada, British North America to Gloucester.
Carolina	United Kingdom	The ship was wrecked near Dingle, County Kerry with the loss of seven of her crew. She was on a voyage from Odesa to Falmouth, Cornwall and Limerick.
City of Limerick	United Kingdom	The schooner was driven ashore in Broadhaven Bay. Her crew were rescued. She was on a voyage from Limerick to Glasgow. She was refloated on 28 November and resumed her voyage in a leaky condition.
Elizabeth	United Kingdom	The flat was driven ashore near Llanbedrog, Caernarfonshire. She was refloated on 23 November.
Fitzhenry	United Kingdom	The ship was driven ashore on Anna Island, in Tralee Bay. She was on a voyage from Tralee, County Kerry to Limerick. She was refloated on 24 November.
George Parkinson	United Kingdom	The barque struck the pier and was driven ashore at Whitby, Yorkshire.
Glocester	United Kingdom	The storeship, a barque, capsized and was wrecked at San Francisco, California, United States.
Heart of Oak	United Kingdom	The ship was driven ashore and wrecked at Holyhead, Anglesey. Her crew were rescued. She was on a voyage from Liverpool, Lancashire to Newport, Monmouthshire.
Henri	France	The ship was wrecked at Jérémie, Haiti.
Henry and Ann	United Kingdom	The ship was driven ashore in the River Shannon. She was on a voyage from Waterford to Limerick.
Henry and Anne	United Kingdom	The brig was driven ashore and wrecked at Carlisle Point, County Cork. All on board were rescued. She was on a voyage from Constantinople, Ottoman Empire to Queenstown, County Cork.
Isabella	United Kingdom	The ship was driven ashore and severely damaged at Warrenpoint, County Antrim. She was on a voyage from Dundalk, County Louth to Newry, County Antrim.
James Hays	United Kingdom	The ship was driven ashore and wrecked at Creakdam, Pembrokeshire. Her crew were rescued. She was on a voyage from Neath, Glamorgan to Cork.
Joven Maria	Spain	The ship was wrecked at San Sebastián with the loss of all but two of her crew. She was on a voyage from Saint John's, Newfoundland, British North America to San Sebastián.
Lark	United Kingdom	The brig was driven ashore and wrecked at Harrington, Cumberland. Her crew were rescued.
Maid of Ross	United Kingdom	The ship was driven ashore near "Clockton", Aberdeenshire.Her crew were rescued. She was on a voyage from Invergordon, Ross-shire to Seaham, County Durham.
Margaret	United Kingdom	The schooner was driven ashore in Llandudno Bay. Her crew were rescued.
Marie Stella	France	The ship ran aground on the Doom Bar. She was on a voyage from Liverpool to Saint-Malo, Ille-et-Vilaine. She was refloated and taken in to Padstow, Cornwall, United Kingdom.
Mary	United Kingdom	The schooner foundered off Bull Head, County Kerry with the loss of all hands.
Medusa	United Kingdom	The ship was wrecked at Smerwick, County Kerry with the loss of a crew member. She was on a voyage from "Marianople" to Limerick.
Prince Albert	United Kingdom	The billy-boy was wrecked off Bideford, Devon. Her crew were rescued by the Bideford Lifeboat. She was on a voyage from Limerick to Gloucester.
Red Rover	United Kingdom	The ship was driven ashore and wrecked at Cahersiveen, County Kerry. She was on a voyage from Cork to Dumfries.
Royal William	United Kingdom	The schooner was wrecked at the mouth of the St. George's Branch of the Danube. Her crew were rescued. She was on a voyage from Cardiff, Glamorgan to Galaţi, Ottoman Empire.
Sarah	United Kingdom	The ship was wreckedin the Magdalen Islands, Nova Scotia, British North America. She was on a voyage from Jamaica to Quebec City, Province of Canada, British North America.
Selah	United Kingdom	The smack was driven ashore at "Cricou", Caernarfonshire.
Successor	United Kingdom	The brig was driven ashore and wrecked on Mutton Island, County Clare with the loss of all hands, at least five lives. She was on a voyage from Limerick to Liverpool.
Welcome	United Kingdom	The ship was driven ashore in Dundrum Bay. Her crew were rescued.

== 21 November ==
List of shipwrecks: 21 November 1850
Ship	State	Description
Alice	United Kingdom	The schooner was wrecked on the Nimrod Rocks, off Holyhead, Anglesey. Her four crew were rescued by the lifeboat № 2 (United Kingdom).
Chamberlain	United Kingdom	The ship foundered in the Irish Sea off the coast of Lancashire with the loss of all hands. She was on a voyage from Lytham St. Annes, Lancashire to Dublin.
Clara	(United Kingdom of Great Britain and Ireland) Guernsey	The barque was wrecked in the Passage de Grêves. Her crew survived. She was on a voyage from Newcastle upon Tyne, Northumberland to Bordeaux, Gironde, France.
Delphin	Sweden	The ship was wrecked on the Domesnes Reef, in the Baltic Sea. Four crew were rescued. She was on a voyage from Ekenäs to Riga, Russia.
Elize	Prussia	The ship was sighted in the Øresund whilst on a voyage from Wolgast to Rochester, Kent, United Kingdom. No further trace, presumed foundered with he loss of all hands.
Fair Acadian	United Kingdom	The ship was wrecked at Hartlepool, County Durham.
General Lamarque	France	The ship was lost in Camaret Bay with the loss of two of her crew. She was on a voyage from Sunderland, County Durham to Nantes, Loire-Inférieure.
George	United Kingdom	The hermaphrodite brig was driven ashore at Pictou, Nova Scotia, British North America.
Gipsy Queen	(United Kingdom of Great Britain and Ireland) British North America	The brig was driven ashore at Pictou.
Gustava Adolph	Russia	The ship was reported missing off the coast of County Limerick.
Joseph	United Kingdom	The brig was driven ashore at Pictou.
Karen Kirstene	Denmark	The ship ran aground on the Herd Sand, in the North Sea off the coast of County Durham. She was refloated.
Nono	Ottoman Empire	The ship was driven ashore at Ballina, County Mayo, United Kingdom. Her eight crew survived. She was on a voyage from Constantinople to Ballina.
Queen	United Kingdom	The schooner was driven ashore and wrecked at Phillack, Cornwall with the loss of all hands. She was on a voyage from Cardiff, Glamorgan to Cagliari, Kingdom of Sardinia with a cargo of tin-plate and iron.
Rival	United Kingdom	The ship was driven ashore on Derrymore Island, in Tralee Bay. She was on a voyage from Limerick to Liverpool, Lancashire.
Victor	United Kingdom	The ship was driven ashore at Barpoint, Cornwall. She was on a voyage from Nantes, Loire-Inférieure, France to Bristol, Gloucestershire. She was refloated and taken in to Falmouth, Cornwall in a leaky condition.

== 22 November ==
List of shipwrecks: 22 November 1850
Ship	State	Description
Coatham	United Kingdom	The ship ran aground on "Runae Island", Russia and was abandoned by her crew. She was on a voyage from Riga, Russia to Chatham, Kent.
Coromandel	United Kingdom	The ship was abandoned in the Atlantic Ocean. Her crew were rescued by Dart (United Kingdom). Coromandel was on a voyage from Quebec City, Province of Canada, British North America to Liverpool, Lancashire. She was taken in to Broadhaven Bay on 14 December in a derelict and waterlogged condition, but drifted out to sea again. Wreckage from the ship came ashore at Stornoway, Isle of Lewis, Outer Hebrides on 17 December.
HMS Flamer	Royal Navy	The Firebrand-class gunvessel ran aground on a reef 14 nautical miles (26 km) south east of Monrovia, Liberia. Her crew survived. Despite attempts to refloat her with the assistance of HMS Cyclops, HMS Hound (both Royal Navy) and Eldorado (French Navy), she was consequently condemned.
Jonge Jacob	Hamburg	The ship was driven ashore and wrecked on Heligoland. Her crew were rescued.
La Reine des Belges	Belgium	The ship was driven ashore and severely damaged in Kinmore Bay, County Kerry, United Kingdom. She was on a voyage from Odesa to Sligo, United Kingdom.
Mary and Frances	United Kingdom	The ship was wrecked at Kirkcudbright. Her crew were rescued.
Perseverance	(United Kingdom of Great Britain and Ireland) British North America	The ship was wrecked on Prince Edward Island with the loss of two of her crew. She was on a voyage from Miramichi, New Brunswick to Liverpool.
Tartar	United Kingdom	The ship sank in Tralee Bay.
Union	(United Kingdom of Great Britain and Ireland) British North America	The ship was wrecked on Prince Edward Island. She was on a voyage from Quebec City to Halifax, Nova Scotia.

== 23 November ==
List of shipwrecks: 23 November 1850
Ship	State	Description
Aspasia	Belgium	The ship was driven ashore at "Sisapoli".
Curlew	United Kingdom	The ship was driven ashore at Cape Split, Nova Scotia, British North America. She was on a voyage from Cornwallis, Province of Canada, British North America to Boston, Massachusetts, United States.
Medora	United Kingdom	The ship ran aground on Saltholm, Denmark. She was on a voyage from Kronstadt, Russia to Bristol, Gloucestershire. She was refloated and resumed her voyage.

== 24 November ==
List of shipwrecks: 24 November 1850
Ship	State	Description
Albatross	United Kingdom	The ship was driven ashore at "Romaic", British Honduras.
Ami du Commerce	Belgium	The ship sprang a leak and was beached at "Kercabelie".
Bedford	United Kingdom	The ship was wrecked at Hurst Castle, Hampshire.
Betsy	United Kingdom	The ship collided with the brig Content (United Kingdom) and sank in the North Sea. Her crew were rescued by Alpha (United Kingdom).
Eleanor	United Kingdom	The ship was driven ashore in the Caratasca Lagoon. her crew were rescued.
Elizabeth	United Kingdom	The sloop was in collision with the brig Queen Victoria (United Kingdom) and sank in the North Sea. Her five crew were rescued by Queen Victoria. Elizabeth was on a voyage from Sunderland, County Durham to Ipswich, Suffolk.
Emile et Marie	United Kingdom	The ship was driven ashore at Rye, Sussex, United Kingdom. She was on a voyage from Caen, Calvados to London, United Kingdom.
Faugh-a-Ballagh	United Kingdom	The ship was in collision with a dredger and was beached at the Landguard Fort, Felixtowe, Suffolk.
Goede Moeder	Norway	The schooner was driven ashore at Poole, Dorset United Kingdom.
Harriet	United Kingdom	The collier foundered in the Bristol Channel. Her crew were rescued by the steamship Osprey (United Kingdom).
Margaret Cunningham	United Kingdom	The sloop was driven ashore at St. Osyth, Essex. She was on a voyage from Blyth, Northumberland to Maldon, Essex. She was refloated on 28 November and taken in to Maldon.
Mitchell Grove	United Kingdom	The ship was driven ashore east of Littlehampton, Sussex.
Nancy	United Kingdom	The ship was driven ashore east of Littlehampton.
Olga	Prussia	The ship ran aground on the Canshe Bank, in the Irish Sea off the coast of Lancashire, United Kingdom and broke her back. She was on a voyage from Liverpool, Lancashire to Memel.
Prince Albert	United Kingdom	The ship was driven ashore at Buttonness, Forfarshire. She was refloated on 28 November and taken in to Dundee, Forfarshire.
Star	United Kingdom	The smack was driven ashore east of Pwllheli, Caernarfonshire. She was on a voyage from Ipswich, Suffolk to Liverpool. She was refloated on 21 February 1851 and taken in to Port Madoc, Caernarfonshire.
Surinam	United Kingdom	The barque was driven ashore at Dunball, Somerset. She was on a voyage from Bathurst, Gambia Colony and Protectorate to Bristol, Gloucestershire.
Unity	United Kingdom	The ship was wrecked on the Frying Pan.
Virginia	United States	The ship departed from Bombay, Indin for Canton, China. No further trace, presumed foundered with the loss of all hands.
Wave	United Kingdom	The ship was driven ashore at Donna Nook, Lincolnshire. She was on a voyage from Wisbech, Cambridgeshire to Newcastle upon Tyne, Northumberland. She was refloated and put in to Grimsby, Lincolnshire.
William	United Kingdom	The ship was driven ashore at Great Yarmouth, Norfolk. She was refloated on 1 December.
Windrush	United Kingdom	The schooner was driven ashore and wrecked at Gunwalloe, Cornwall with the loss of all five of her crew. She was on a voyage from Málaga, Spain to Falmouth, Cornwall.

== 25 November ==
List of shipwrecks: 25 November 1850
Ship	State	Description
Auguste	Belgium	The ship was abandoned in the Skaggerak. Her crew were rescued. She was on a voyage from Antwerp to Rostock.
Brilliant	United Kingdom	The brig was wrecked near Étaples, Pas-de-Calais, France with the loss of one of her ten crew. She was on a voyage from Quebec City, Province of Canada, British North America to Rye, Sussex.
Gazelle	United Kingdom	The brig foundered off the Kentish Knock with the loss of all hands. She was on a voyage from Sydney, New South Wales to London.
New Phœnix	United Kingdom	The ship was driven ashore and severely damaged at Workington, Cumberland. She was on a voyage from Maryport, Cumberland to Sierra Leone.
Norwich Merchant	United Kingdom	The ship was run into by a schooner and was abandoned by her crew, who were rescued by a fishing smack. She was subsequently driven ashore and wrecked south of Whitby, Yorkshire. She was on a voyage from Middlesbrough, Yorkshire to Great Yarmouth, Norfolk.
Rio Grande	(United Kingdom of Great Britain and Ireland) British North America	The ship was wrecked in Holland Bay, Jamaica.
San Antonio	Kingdom of Sardinia	The ship was wrecked at Aigues-Mortes, Gard, France. Her crew were rescued. She was on a voyage from Genoa to Oran, Algeria.
Wreath	United Kingdom	The schooner foundered off the Dudgeon Sand, in the North Sea. Her crew were rescued by the lugger James and Ann (United Kingdom). Wreath was on a voyage from Sunderland, County Durham to Harwich, Essex.

== 26 November ==
List of shipwrecks: 25 November 1850
Ship	State	Description
Dromadaire	(France) Martinique	The drogher was driven ashore and wrecked on Martinique. Her crew were rescued.
Enfans Cheris	Belgium	The ship was abandoned in the Gulf of Genoa. Her crew were rescued by Gretchen (Flag unknown).
Gentleman	United Kingdom	The ship was driven ashore at Orwell, Prince Edward Island, British North America.
Gloucester	United Kingdom	The storeship, a barque, capsized and sank at San Francisco, California, United States.
Hertzog Joseph	Hamburg	The brig was driven ashore at "Porto Plata". She subsequently became a wreck.
Steerwell	United Kingdom	The schooner ran aground and was severely damaged on the Gar Sand, in the North Sea off the mouth of the River Tees. She was on a voyage from Port Dinorwic, Caernarfonshire to Stockton-on-Tees, County Durham. She was refloated on 5 December and towed in to Stockton-on-Tees.

== 27 November ==
List of shipwrecks: 27 November 1850
Ship	State	Description
Bazelene	United Kingdom	The ship was driven ashore at Hayle, Cornwall. She was on a voyage from Hayle to St. Ives, Cornwall.
Clausina	(United Kingdom of Great Britain and Ireland) British North America	The barque was driven ashore at Charlottetown, Prince Edward Island.
Dispatch	United Kingdom	The sloop sprang a leak and foundered in the North Sea off Cromer, Norfolk. Her crew were rescued by the Barking smack Prosperous (United Kingdom). Dispatch was on a voyage from South Shields, County Durham to Lowestoft, Suffolk.
Harmonie	Elbing	The ship sank in the North Sea off Terschelling, Friesland, Netherlands. Her crew survived. She was on a voyage from Elbing to London, United Kingdom.
Mary	United Kingdom	The ship was driven ashore and severely damaged west of Wells-next-the-Sea, Norfolk.
Neptunus	Bremen	The ship was driven ashore in the Weser downstream of Wremen. She was on a voyage from Charleston, South Carolina to Bremen.
Prudent	United Kingdom	The ship was driven ashore at Covehithe, Suffolk. She was refloated and taken in to Lowestoft.
Ray	United Kingdom	The schooner foundered in the North Sea off Cromer. Her crew were rescued by the brig Friends (United Kingdom). Ray was on a voyage from Sunderland, County Durham to Rochester, Kent.
Russell	United Kingdom	The ship ran aground and sank at Lowestoft.
Steerswell	United Kingdom	The ship ran aground and was wrecked at the mouth of the River Tees. Her crew were rescued. She was on a voyage from Bangor to Stockton-on-Tees, County Durham.
Thomas	United Kingdom	The ship departed from Wexford for Bordeaux, Gironde, France. No further trace, presumed foundered with the loss of all hands.
Wilhelm	Rostock	The schooner was wrecked off Lancken, Prussia.
Wray	United Kingdom	The schooner foundered in the North Sea off Cromer. Her crew were rescued. She was on a voyage from Sunderland, County Durham to Rochester, Kent.

== 28 November ==
List of shipwrecks: 28 November 1850
Ship	State	Description
Avina	Kingdom of Hanover	The ship was driven ashore on Langeoog. Her crew were rescued. She was on a voyage from Ditzum to London, United Kingdom. Avina had become a wreck by 1 December.
Farmer's Delegate	United Kingdom	The ship was driven onto the Sandwich Flats, Kent. She was on a voyage from London to Swansea, Glamorgan.
Foam	United Kingdom	The schooner was run down by the full-rigged ship Grace MacVea (United Kingdom) and abandoned in the North Channel, off Rathlin Island, County Antrim. Her crew were rescued by Grace MacVea. Foam was on a voyage from Londonderry to Troon, Ayrshire.
George Hudson	United Kingdom	The ship ran aground on the Scroby Sands, Norfolk. She was on a voyage from Newcastle upon Tyne, Northumberland to Naples, Kingdom of the Two Sicilies. She was refloated and anchored off Great Yarmouth, Norfolk.
Governor Darling	(United Kingdom of Great Britain and Ireland) Saint Lucia	The sloop was driven ashore and wrecked in Dauphin Bay. Her crew were rescued.
Helena Sloman	Hamburg	The passenger ship was abandoned in the Atlantic Ocean with the loss of five of the 184 people on board. Survivors were rescued by Devonshire (United Kingdom), which lost four of her crew effecting the rescue. Helena Sloman was on a voyage from Hamburg to New York, United States.
Laurel	United Kingdom	The brig was lost off Mallorca, Spain. Her crew survived. She was on a voyage from Livorno, Grand Duchy of Tuscany to Liverpool, Lancashire.
L'Oriente	France	The ship ran aground and was wrecked at Dover, Kent.
Pierre	France	The ship was driven onto the Sandwich Flats. She was on a voyage from London to Rouen, Seine-Inférieure. She was refloated the next day and taken in to Dover.
Rosela	France	The ship was driven ashore near Calais.
Shamrock	United Kingdom	The ship was driven ashore at Bailey Brook, Nova Scotia, British North America. She was on a voyage from Prince Edward Island, British North America to an English port.
Speck	United Kingdom	The ship was driven ashore on "Cariboo Island", British North America.
Stad Dordrecht	Netherlands	The steam ship was driven ashore on Goeree, Zeeland. She was on a voyage from Dordrecht, South Holland to London. She was refloated and put in to Hellevoetsluis, Zeeland.
Susannah	United Kingdom	The smack sank at Whitstable, Kent.

== 29 November ==
List of shipwrecks: 29 November 1850
Ship	State	Description
Albion	United Kingdom	The ship ran aground on the Goodwin Sands, Kent. She was refloated and taken in to Dover, Kent in a waterlogged condition.
Elizabeth	United Kingdom	The ship foundered in the North Sea 15 nautical miles (28 km) off the Haisborough Sands. Her crew were rescued by a Norwegian barque. She was on a voyage from Hartlepool, County Durham to Lowestoft, Suffolk.
Hope	United Kingdom	The ship was driven ashore and wrecked at Camden Point, County Cork. She was on a voyage from Queenstown, County Cork to Bristol, Gloucestershire. She had broken up by 2 December.
Panama	United Kingdom	The ship ran aground on the Troubridge Shoals. She was on a voyage from Plymouth, Devon to Adelaide, South Australia. She was refloated and taken in to Port Phillip, South Australia in a severely leaky condition.
Rossea	Russia	The ship was driven ashore west of Calais, France. She was on a voyage from Kronstadt to Bordeaux, Gironde, France.
Wasp	(United Kingdom of Great Britain and Ireland) British North America	The ship was wrecked south of Petty Harbour, Newfoundland with the loss of all but one of her crew.

== 30 November ==
List of shipwrecks: 30 November 1850
Ship	State	Description
Auguste Caroline	Sweden	The ship ran aground on the Newcombe Sand, in the North Sea off the coast of Suffolk, United Kingdom. She was on a voyage from "Anclam" to Visby.
Elizabeth Young	United Kingdom	The ship ran aground on the Scroby Sands, Norfolk. She was on a voyage from London to South Shields, County Durham. She was refloated.
Four Sisters	United Kingdom	The ship capsized at Salonica, Greece. her crew were rescued. She was refloated on 3 February 1851.
Hero	United Kingdom	The ship was driven ashore at Redcar, Yorkshire. She was on a voyage from Newcastle upon Tyne, Northumberland to London. She was refloated and resumed her voyage.
Rover	United Kingdom	The ship foundered in the Atlantic Ocean off Ouessant, Finistère, France. Her crew were rescued by Jeune Adelaide (France). Rover was on a voyage from Hartlepool, County Durham to the Charente.
William	United Kingdom	The schooner was wrecked near the South Rock Lighthouse, County Down. Her crew were rescued. She was on a voyage from Liverpool, Lancashire to Londonderry.

== Unknown date ==
List of shipwrecks: Unknown date in November 1850
Ship	State	Description
Agnes	United Kingdom	The ship was wrecked at Fraserburgh, Aberdeenshire before 12 November. She was on a voyage from Easdale, Argyllshire to Stirling.
Alexander	United Kingdom	The ship was abandoned in the Atlantic Ocean before 12 December. She was on a voyage from Canso, Nova Scotia, British North America to Milford Haven, Pembrokeshire.
Alvis	France	The ship was driven ashore near "Abrevache". She was on a voyage from Adra, Spain to Havre de Grâce, Seine-Inférieure, France.
Ann Elliott	United Kingdom	The ship was wrecked on a reef in the Baltic Sea off Hogland, Russia before 2 November. She was on a voyage from Kronstadt, Russia to London.
Aros	Sweden	The full-rigged ship foundered off Landsort with the loss of all hands between 9 and 16 November with the loss of all hands.
Confidence	United Kingdom	The brig was wrecked at Jérémie, Haiti before 27 November.
Eclipse	Haiti	The schooner was wrecked at Jérémie before 27 November.
Ellen and George	United Kingdom	The ship was driven ashore in Filey Bay. She was on a voyage from Hull, Yorkshire to Middlesbrough, Yorkshire. She was refloated and put in to Scarborough, Yorkshire, where she arrived on 9 November.
Emma Skerrett	United Kingdom	The ship departed from Honolulu, Kingdom of Hawaii for Sydney. No further trace, presumed foundered in the Pacific Ocean with the loss of all hands.
Erin-go-Bragh	United Kingdom	The ship was driven ashore on the Sand Key before 23 November. She was on a voyage from New Orleans, Louisiana, United States to Liverpool, Lancashire. She was refloated five days later.
Garonne	France	The ship was wrecked near Wyk auf Föhr, Duchy of Holstein before 8 November. She was on a voyage from Bordeaux, Gironde to Bremen.
George	(United Kingdom of Great Britain and Ireland) British North America	The ship was wrecked at Malignant Cove, Nova Scotia before 27 November.
Hebe	United Kingdom	The ship ran aground on the Salthouse Bank, in the Irish Sea off the coast of Lancashire and sank before 8 November. She was on a voyage from Newport, Monmouthshire to London.
Henriette	France	The brig was driven ashore 8 nautical miles (15 km) north of Point Reyes, California, United States. She was on a voyage from Valparaíso, Chile to San Francisco, California.
Henry	France	The barque was wrecked at Jérémie before 27 November.
Hugo	Russia	The ship was driven ashore at Kuressaare. She was on a voyage from Newcastle upon Tyne, Northumberland, United Kingdom to Riga.
June	Norway	The brig was wrecked at Jérémie before 27 November.
La Trois Frères	France	The ship departed from Marseille, Bouches-du-Rhône for Penang, Malaya. No further trace, presumed foundered with the loss of all hands.
Lisbon	United Kingdom	The ship was driven ashore on the coast of Kent. She was on a voyage from Saint John, New Brunswick, British North America to London. She was refloated on 25 November and taken in to The Downs.
Mina	United Kingdom	The ship was driven ashore on the Russian coast. She was on a voyage from Saint Petersburg, Russia to London. She was refloated and taken in to Reval, where she arrived on 12 November.
Narwood	United Kingdom	The ship ran aground off "Gofte". She was on a voyage from Narva, Russia to Danzig. She was refloated and taken in to Reval, where she arrived on 12 November in a leaky condition.
Neutral	United Kingdom	The brig was abandoned in the Atlantic Ocean before 2 November.
Orezalia	United Kingdom	The ship was wrecked at Bonny, Africa in early November.
Prince of Wales	(United Kingdom of Great Britain and Ireland) British North America	The ship was wrecked in Fortune Bay before 13 November.
Pursuit	United Kingdom	The brig was driven ashore and wrecked on Fortune Island, Bahamas before 30 November. Her crew were rescued.
Read	United Kingdom	The sailing barge was wrecked on the Gunfleet Sand, in the North Sea off the coast of Essex with the loss of all hands.
Reindeer	(United Kingdom of Great Britain and Ireland) British North America	The brig was wrecked on the Flogger Shoal, in Delaware Bay before 14 November with the loss of all hands. She was on a voyage from Málaga, Spain to Philadelphia, Pennsylvania, United States.
Rob Roy	(United Kingdom of Great Britain and Ireland) British North America	The ship was wrecked in the Gut of Canso before 27 November.
San Antonio	Spain	The ship capsized off Cape Spartel, Morocco. Eight crew survived. She was on a voyage from Algeciras to Tangier, Morocco.
Shamrock	United Kingdom	The ship was driven ashore at Whitehaven, Cumberland. She was refloated on 29 November.
Striden	Sweden	The ship was wrecked near Wasa, Grand Duchy of Finland before 16 November with the loss of all hands. She was on a voyage from Nye Carleby to Lübeck.
Tellus	United States	The schooner was wrecked at Jérémie before 27 November.
Wanderer	United Kingdom	The ship was driven ashore in Gallipoli Bay. She was on a voyage from Odesa to a British port. She was later refloated.
