= List of shipwrecks in January 1886 =

The list of shipwrecks in January 1886 includes ships sunk, foundered, grounded, or otherwise lost during January 1886.

== 1 January ==
List of shipwrecks: 1 January 1886
Ship	State	Description
Aurora I	Austria-Hungary	The ship was destroyed by fire at Saint Helena. Her crew were rescued by HMS Watchful (Royal Navy).
Cochrane	United Kingdom	The steamship was driven ashore at Coatham, Yorkshire. She was refloated and beached. She was later refloated and taken in to Middlesbrough, Yorkshire.
Gratitude	United Kingdom	The barquentine ran aground at Ramsgate, Kent and became waterlogged.
Hugh Cann	United Kingdom	The ship was run into by a steamship at Gravesend, Kent and was severely damaged.
Maitlands	United Kingdom	The steamship ran aground in the Guadalquivir. She was on a voyage from Seville, Spain to Hull, Yorkshire.

== 2 January ==
List of shipwrecks: 2 January 1886
Ship	State	Description
Kelso	United Kingdom	The steamship sprang a leak and was run ashore at Trelleborg, Sweden. She was on a voyage from Riga, Russia to Hull, Yorkshire. She was refloated the next day and taken in to Copenhagen, Denmark.
W. D. Chipley	United States	The steamship struck a snag and sank in the Chattahoochee River at Stark Clay Landing with the loss of eleven lives. She was a total loss.

== 3 January ==
List of shipwrecks: 3 January 1886
Ship	State	Description
Agnes	United Kingdom	The brig was wrecked at "Half Jack". The wreck was plundered by the local inhabitants.
Lady of the Lake	United Kingdom	The schooner struck the Faggot Rock, on the coast of Northumberland and sank. Her crew were rescued. She was on a voyage from Sunderland, County Durham to Arbroath, Forfarshire.
Mabel	United Kingdom	The barque foundered off Nash Point, Glamorgan with the loss of all sixteen people on board. She was on a voyage from the West Indies to Bristol, Gloucestershire.

== 4 January ==
List of shipwrecks: 4 January 1886
Ship	State	Description
Frank N Thayer	United States	Two of the ship's crew mutinied and set the ship afire in the South Atlantic having killed five of her crew and severely injure her captain. The mutineers then jumped overboard. The survivors took to a boat, and landed on Saint Helena a week later.
Rosalie	United Kingdom	The barque was run down and sunk by a steamship off the coast of Friesland, Netherlands with the loss of nine of her ten crew. The survivor was rescued by a fishing smack. She was on a voyage from Bremerhaven, Germany to the Mumbles, Glamorgan.

== 5 January ==
List of shipwrecks: 5 January 1886
Ship	State	Description
Adolphus	United Kingdom	The ship was driven ashore on the Delaware Breakwater, United States. She was on a voyage from London to Philadelphia, Pennsylvania, United States. She subsequently became a wreck.
Delight	United Kingdom	The ship departed from Sunderland, County Durham for Arbroath, Forfarshire. No further trace, reported overdue.
John Pitcairn	United Kingdom	The brig was driven ashore at Whitstable, Kent.
Victoria	United Kingdom	The brigantine ran aground on the Whittker Sand and was abandoned. Her crew were rescued. She was on a voyage from[Sunderland, to Southampton, Hampshire.
Unnamed	Flag unknown	The ship foundered off Jersey, Channel Islands.

== 6 January ==
List of shipwrecks: 6 January 1886
Ship	State	Description
Maggie	United Kingdom	The schooner was driven ashore at Sunderland, County Durham. She subsequently became a wreck.
Meridian	United Kingdom	The brig ran aground in the River Ouse 1 nautical mile (1.9 km) downstream of Goole, Yorkshire. She was refloated with the assistance of three tugs and taken in to Goole.

== 7 January ==
List of shipwrecks: 7 January 1886
Ship	State	Description
Annie	United Kingdom	The trow sprang a leak and sank in the River Usk. She was on a voyage from Newport, Monmouthshire to Bristol, Gloucestershire.
Cygnus	Sweden	The barque was driven ashore at Workington, Cumberland, United Kingdom with the loss of one of her ten crew. She was on a voyage from Galveston, Texas, United States to Maryport, Cumberland.
Ebenezer	United Kingdom	The fishing boat was driven ashore at Anstruther, Fife. Her crew were rescued. She was refloated and taken in to Anstruther.
Glyndur	United Kingdom	The schooner was driven ashore and wrecked in the Hilbre Islands, Cheshire. Her crew were rescued.
John	United Kingdom	The schooner was wrecked near "Stress". Her crew were rescued.
Lancaster Castle	United Kingdom	The ship collided with the steamship Durham City (United Kingdom) in the River Thames and was beached near Barking, Essex.
The Native	United Kingdom	The schooner was wrecked on Ringwood Rocks, near Ardglass, County Down. Her crew survived.
Paul Marie	France	The brig ran aground and sank at Penarth, Glamorgan, United Kingdom. She was on a voyage from Newport, Monmouthshire to Redon, Ille-et-Vilaine.
Pearl	United Kingdom	The Mersey Flat was driven ashore at Pilling, Lancashire. Her crew survived. She was on a voyage from Liverpool to Fleetwood, Lancashire.
Richard	Canada	The barque was driven ashore at Cardiff, Glamorgan. She was on a voyage from Cardiff to Buenos Aires, Argentina. She was refloated and taken in to Cardiff in a leaky condition.
Rosalind	United Kingdom	The brigantine foundered in the Atlantic Ocean. Her crew were rescued by Flora (United Kingdom). Rosalind was on a voyage from Santos, Brazil to Sanlúcar de Barrameda, Spain.
Swallow	United Kingdom	The schooner was wrecked at Pilling. All on board drowned.
Whitehaven Lifeboat	Royal National Lifeboat Institution	The lifeboat capsized while assisting the barque Cygnus (Sweden) with the loss of a crew member.
Unnamed	United Kingdom	The fishing boat was wrecked at Crail, Fife. Her six crew were rescued by rocket apparatus.

== 8 January ==
List of shipwrecks: 8 January 1886
Ship	State	Description
Cornishman	United Kingdom	The steamship struck the Pedra d'Arca rock, south of Cabo da Roca, Portugal and foundered. Her crew took to the boats; they were rescued by the steamship Whitby Abbey (United Kingdom) and the tug Conductor (Flag unknown). Cornishman was on a voyage from Sulina, Romania to Sligo.
Harkaway	United Kingdom	The schooner was lost at Minehead, Somerset. She was on a voyage from a port in South Wales with coal to Truro, Cornwall. A boat from Harkaway came ashore at Porlock, Somerset with a dead body aboard.
I. H. Higgins	United States	The schooner was lost in a storm.
Levanter	United States	The fishing schooner struck a reef near Lockeport, Nova Scotia, Canada and was wrecked. Her crew were rescued.
Rattler	United States	The schooner was lost in a storm, she dragged anchor and went ashore on a ledge at Eastport, Maine and sank. Her crew were rescued.
René	France	The barque was driven ashore and wrecked at the Gower, Glamorgan, United Kingdom with the loss of four of her nine crew.

== 9 January ==
List of shipwrecks: 9 January 1886
Ship	State	Description
Alicia A. Washburn	United States	The steamship caught fire and sank in the Gulf of Mexico 25 nautical miles (46 km; 29 mi) off St. George Island, Florida.
Busy Bee	United Kingdom	The smack was run into by the smack Sparkling Nellie (United Kingdom) and sank in the North Sea with the loss of all but one of her crew. The survivor was rescued by Sparkling Nellie.
Chrissie Wright	United States	The schooner was wrecked off Beaufort (North or South Carolina) with the loss of all but one of her crew.
Confidence, and an unnamed vessel	United States	The tug Confidence and the lighter she was towing foundered in Massachusetts Bay with the loss of 40 lives.
James Kenway	United Kingdom	The barque was wrecked at Carmel Head, Anglesey with the loss of two of her fourteen crew. Her captain was rescued from the rigging by the Holyhead Lifeboat, the rest of the crew reached shore in a boat. She was on a voyage from Liverpool, Lancashire to Charleston, South Carolina, United States. There was a Board of Trade Enquiry into the loss.
Mary Farr	United States	The schooner was struck by lightning at Long Branch, New Jersey. She was destroyed by fire with the loss of all hands.
Millie	United States	The schooner was wrecked near Boston, Massachusetts with the loss of six lives.
Rosamund	United Kingdom	The barquentine foundered off the Isles of Scilly. Her nine crew were rescued by the barque Flora (United Kingdom).
Three unnamed vessels	Flags unknown	The schooners were wrecked on the coasts of New Jersey and Long Island, New York, United States with the loss of all hands.
60 unnamed vessels	Flags unknown	The ships were wrecked on the coast of New Jersey east of Sandy Hook with the loss of about twenty lives.

== 10 January ==
List of shipwrecks: 10 January 1886
Ship	State	Description
Hudson Bay	United Kingdom	The full-rigged ship capsized 120 nautical miles (220 km) south of Plettenberg Bay or 16 nautical miles (30 km) south of Cape St. Francis), Cape Colony with the loss of fifteen of her 25 crew. Survivors took to a boat; they were rescued by Southern Cross (United States).

== 11 January ==
List of shipwrecks: 11 January 1886
Ship	State	Description
Hylton Castle	United Kingdom	The steamship sank in the Atlantic Ocean about 15 nautical miles (28 km) south of the Fire Island Lighthouse, New York. Her 22 crew took to two lifeboats; one lifeboat reached shore, the other lifeboat capsized with the loss of seven lives. Survivors were rescued on 14 January by the fishing smack Stephen Woolsey (United States). Hylton Castle was on a voyage from New York City to Rouen, Seine-Inférieure, France.
Witherspoon	United States	The schooner was wrecked on Nantucket Island, Massachusetts with the loss of eight of her ten crew.
Unnamed	Flag unknown	The steamship collided with another vessel and sank in The Downs.

== 12 January ==
List of shipwrecks: 12 January 1886
Ship	State	Description
Earl of Beaconsfield	United Kingdom	The full-rigged ship was driven ashore at Cardiff, Glamorgan. She was refloated and taken in to Sully, Glamorgan.
Feronia	Germany	The steamship sank off Terschelling, Friesland, Netherlands with some loss of life. There were fourteen survivors; they were rescued by the steamship Berlin (Germany).

== 13 January ==
List of shipwrecks: 13 January 1886
Ship	State	Description
Altona	United Kingdom	The steamship ran aground in the River Ouse at Goole, Yorkshire. She was on a voyage from Goole to Rouen, Seine-Inférieure, France.
Fischat	Belgium	The steamship ran aground in the Scheldt at "Everingen". She was on a voyage from Antwerp to Panama City, United States of Colombia. She was refloated and resumed her voyage.
General Gordon	United Kingdom	The steam trawler was driven ashore on the Isle of May, Fife and was wrecked. Her crew were rescued.
Lima	United Kingdom	The ship was sighted in the Atlantic Ocean whilst on a voyage from Java, Netherlands East Indies to the English Channel. No further trace, reported overdue.
Little John	United Kingdom	The fishing trawler foundered in the North Sea. Her crew were rescued by the tug Selina (United Kingdom).
Unnamed	United Kingdom	The lighter was run into by the steamship Ralph Creyke (United Kingdom) and sank in the River Ouse at York.

== 14 January ==
List of shipwrecks: 14 January 1886
Ship	State	Description
Germanic	United Kingdom	The steamship ran aground at Egremont, Lancashire. She was refloated and taken in to Birkenhead, Cheshire.

== 15 January ==
List of shipwrecks: 15 January 1886
Ship	State	Description
Boston	United Kingdom	The steamship was driven ashore in the River Thames at the Coalhouse Fort, Essex. She was on a voyage from South Shields, County Durham to London.
Flying Breeze	United Kingdom	The tug was holed by the propeller of the steamship Thanemore (United Kingdom) and sank at Liverpool, Lancashire.
Fremad	Denmark	The schooner was run into by the steamship Ituna (United Kingdom) at Amble, Northumberland, United Kingdom and was severely damaged.

== 17 January ==
List of shipwrecks: 17 January 1886
Ship	State	Description
Georg Wilhelm	Russia	The galiot was abandoned in the Baltic Sea off Rügen, Germany. She was on a voyage from St. Ubes, Portugal to Riga.

== 18 January ==
List of shipwrecks: 18 January 1886
Ship	State	Description
Roath	United Kingdom	The steamship was run into by the steamship Pemptos (United Kingdom) and sank at Penarth, Glamorgan. Her crew were rescued by Pemptos. Roath was on a voyage from Newport, Monmouthshire to Waterford.
Syren	United Kingdom	The schooner ran aground on the Cross Sands, in the North Sea off the coast of Norfolk. She floated off and foundered. Her crew were rescued by the Caister Lifeboat. She was on a voyage from London to Goole, Yorkshire.

== 19 January ==
List of shipwrecks: 19 January 1886
Ship	State	Description
Victory	United Kingdom	The fishing boat foundered off the coast of Ayrshire with the loss of both crew.

== 20 January ==
List of shipwrecks: 20 January 1886
Ship	State	Description
Gudrim	Flag unknown	The brigantine ran aground off Vlissingen, Zeeland, Netherlands. She was refloated and found to be leaky. She was towed to Gravesend, Kent, United Kingdom by the tug Sultan (Belgium).

== 21 January ==
List of shipwrecks: 21 January 1886
Ship	State	Description
Andriana Stathatos	Greece	The steamship caught fire at Cardiff, Glamorgan, United Kingdom.
Riflemen	(United Kingdom of Great Britain and Ireland) Guernsey	The schooner foundered in the North Sea 22 nautical miles (41 km) off Spurn Point, Yorkshire with the loss of six of her nine crew. Survivors were rescued by Coriande (Flag unknown).

== 22 January ==
List of shipwrecks: 22 January 1886
Ship	State	Description
Battestina	Italy	The ship departed from Cardiff, Glamorgan, United Kingdom for Buenos Aires, Argentina. No further trace, reported missing.
Dracona	United Kingdom	The steamship ran aground at Portland, Dorset. She was on a voyage from Bombay, India to Hull, Yorkshire.
Marie	Germany	The barque ran aground on the Stony Binks, off the mouth of the Humber. Her crew were rescued by the Spurn Lifeboat. She was on a voyage from Wilmington, Delaware, United States to Hull. She was refloated the next day with assistance from the tugs Liverpool and May (both United Kingdom) and was beached at Grimsby, Lincolnshire in a waterlogged condition.
Mary Ann	United Kingdom	The ship was driven ashore in the Paraná River. She was on a voyage from "Mal Alrigo" to a British port. She was refloated on 11 February and taken in to "Esquina".

== 23 January ==
List of shipwrecks: 23 January 1886
Ship	State	Description
Kawe	Norway	The barque was abandoned off Madeira. Her crew were rescued. She was on a voyage from Tunis, Tunisia to Arendal. Kawe was subsequently towed in to Tenerife, Canary Islands by the steamship Ville de Ceara (France).

== 24 January ==
List of shipwrecks: 24 January 1886
Ship	State	Description
Catherine	Norway	The barque was driven ashore and wrecked at Cette, Hérault, France. Her crew were rescued. She was on a voyage from Oran, Algeria to Cette.
Sarah	United Kingdom	The schooner was abandoned 30 nautical miles (56 km) off the Bishop's Rock Lighthouse, Cornwall.

== 25 January ==
List of shipwrecks: 25 January 1886
Ship	State	Description
Hercules	Norway	The full-rigged ship was abandoned in the Atlantic Ocean (45°00′N 22°07′W). Her nineteen crew were rescued by the barque Lord of the Isles (United Kingdom). Hercules was on a voyage from Pensacola, Florida, United States to London, United Kingdom.

== 26 January ==
List of shipwrecks: 26 January 1886
Ship	State	Description
Edward Eccles	United Kingdom	The steamship sank at Gravesend, Kent. She was later refloated and towed in to Northfleet, Kent.
Regobuen	Norway	The barque was driven ashore at Dymchurch, Kent. She was on a voyage from Grimstad to Liverpool, Lancashire, United Kingdom. She was refloated the next day and towed in to Dover, Kent.
Unkel Braesig	Germany	The ship was abandoned in the Atlantic Ocean. Her crew were rescued by a British ship, either Elizabeth Ostle or Julia H..

== 27 January ==
List of shipwrecks: 27 January 1886
Ship	State	Description
Empress of India	United Kingdom	The brigantine foundered in the Atlantic Ocean. Her crew were rescued by the barque Erling (Norway). Empress of India was on a voyage from Liverpool, Lancashire to the Natal Colony.
Storm Queen	United Kingdom	The steamship was driven ashore in the Straits of Babel Mandeb. She was on a voyage from Kurrachee, India to Liverpool, Lancashire.

== 28 January ==
List of shipwrecks: 28 January 1886
Ship	State	Description
Congella	United Kingdom	The steamship was driven ashore at Whitburn, County Durham. She was later refloated with the assistance of four tugs and taken in to Sunderland, County Durham.

== 30 January ==
List of shipwrecks: 30 January 1886
Ship	State	Description
Fulmar	United Kingdom	The ship sank in Farrihy Bay, north of Kilkee, County Clare with the loss of all seventeen crew. She was on a voyage from Troon, Ayrshire to Limerick.
Maria Catharine	United Kingdom	The schooner ran aground on the Goodwin Sands, Kent and sank. Both crew members were rescued by the tug Gamecock (United Kingdom). Maria Catherine was on a voyage from Bangor, Caernarfonshire to London.
Thames	United Kingdom	The steamship ran aground on the Cross Sand, in the North Sea off the coast of Norfolk. She was on a voyage from Grimsby, Lincolnshire to Barcelona, Spain. She was refloated and towed in to Gravesend, Kent by two tugs.

== 31 January ==
List of shipwrecks: 31 January 1886
Ship	State	Description
Alice	United Kingdom	The schooner was driven into the steamship Ogmore (United Kingdom) and sank off Penarth, Glamorgan. Her crew survived. Alice was on a voyage from Cork to Cardiff, Glamorgan. She was refloated on 7 April and beached.
Cumberland	United Kingdom	The steamship ran aground on the Abertay Bank, at the mouth of the River Tay, and was wwrecked. She was on a voyage from Sunderland, County Durham to Dundee, Forfarshire.
Fulmer	United Kingdom	The steamship foundered in the Irish Sea with the loss of all sixteen crew. She was on a voyage from Troon, Ayrshire to Limerick.

== Unknown date ==
List of shipwrecks: Unknown date in January 1886
Ship	State	Description
Abner Coburn	United Kingdom	The ship ran aground on the South West Spit. She was on a voyage from London, United Kingdom to New York. She was refloated and found to be severely leaky.
Alice A. Washburn	United States	The ship was destroyed by fire at sea. She was on a voyage from Mobile, Alabama to New York.
Amtmand Aal	Norway	The brigantine was driven ashore at Aveiro, Portugal. Her crew were rescued.
Antonie Von Cleve	Germany	The barque was driven ashore and wrecked at "Chamelecón", Honduras. Her crew were rescued.
Ashgrove	United Kingdom	The ship was abandoned in the Atlantic Ocean. Her crew were rescued by the steamship Cassius (Germany) and an Austro-Hungarian barque. Ashgrove was on a voyage from Liverpool, Lancashire to a port in New Brunswick, Canada.
Aurora J.	Flag unknown	The ship was destroyed by fire at Saint Helena. She was on a voyage from Passroeang, Netherlands East Indies to Cádiz, Spain.
Camellia	United Kingdom	The schooner was driven ashore south of Figueira da Foz, Portugal. She was on a voyage from Saint John's, Newfoundland Colony to Figueira da Foz.
Capella	Sweden	The barque was abandoned in the Atlantic Ocean. Her crew were rescued.
Catherine	Norway	The barque caught fire in the Atlantic Ocean and was abandoned between 21 and 29 January. She was on a voyage from Savannah, Georgia, United States to London.
Chilian	United Kingdom	The steamship collided with the steamship August (United Kingdom) and was severely damaged. She was on a voyage from New Orleans, Louisiana, United States to Havre de Grâce, Seine-Inférieure, France. Chilian was taken in to Havre de Grâce in a severely leaky condition and sank there.
Christiansborg	Denmark	The steamship ran aground in the Scheldt. She was on a voyage from Riga, Russia to Antwerp, Belgium.
City of Nassau	United States	The steamship was wrecked at Cape Hatteras, North Carolina before 4 January.
Crystal	United Kingdom	The steamship arrived at New York on fire. She was on a voyage from Leith, Lothian to New York. The fire was extinguished.
Danish Monarch	United Kingdom	The steamship was driven ashore in the Sea of Marmara at "Darsana Bournou", Ottoman Empire. She was on a voyage from Odesa, Russia to Alexandria, Egypt.
Dido	United Kingdom	The ship was driven ashore and wrecked at Llanddulas, Caernarfonshire. She was on a voyage from Garston, Lancashire to Amlwch, Anglesey.
Donegal	United Kingdom	The steamship struck the South Rock and was beached at Ballywalter, County Antrim. She was on a voyage from Cardiff, Glamorgan to Londonderry. She was later refloated and taken in to Belfast, County Antrim for repairs.
Eliza	United Kingdom	The schooner was driven ashore near Kilrush, County Clare before 4 January. She was on a voyage from Liscannon, County Clare to Waterford. She subsequently became a wreck.
Eliza	Norway	The schooner was driven ashore at Stavanger. She was on a voyage from Cádiz to Stavanger.
Elizabeth	United Kingdom	The ship was abandoned in the Atlantic Ocean. She was on a voyage from Lockeport, Nova Scotia, Canada to Barbados.
Emidia	Canada	The ship was abandoned in the Atlantic Ocean before 23 January.
Ethel M. Davis	United States	The schooner was driven ashore at Minatitlán, Mexico. She was on a voyage from New York to the Tonalá River.
Emman and Esther	United Kingdom	The ship foundered in the North Sea. A boat washed up at Donna Nook, Lincolnshire with a dead body aboard.
Eugenie	United Kingdom	The brigantine ran aground at the mouth of the River Shannon. She was on a voyage from Sunderland, County Durham to Limerick.
Fannie R. Williams	United States	The ship was driven ashore at Sandy Hook, New Jersey. She was on a voyage from Caibarién, Cuba to New York. She was refloated.
Fanny	United Kingdom	The brigantine was driven ashore and wrecked in Luce Bay.
Fenella	United Kingdom	The steamship was driven ashore in Dunraven Bay. She was refloated with the assistance of two tugs.
Folden	Norway	The brig was driven ashore and wrecked at Goatzacoalcos, Mexico. She was on a voyage from Minatitlán to Queenstown, County Cork, United Kingdom.
Fortune	United Kingdom	The smack was driven ashore east of Watchet, Somerset. Her crew were rescued.
Freight	United Kingdom	The brigantine sank off Penarth, Glamorgan.
Fremad	Norway	The steamship was driven ashore and wrecked on the Swedish coast. She was on a voyage from Königsberg, Germany to Kristiansund.
Freya	Norway	The barque was driven ashore west of Dunkirk, Nord, France.
Grange Fell	United Kingdom	The ship ran aground on the Foulness Sand, in the North Sea off the coast of Essex. She was refloated and put back to Sheerness, Kent.
Guide	United Kingdom	The schooner was driven ashore at the mouth of the Thorny Creek, in the River Thames. She was on a voyage from Whitstable, Kent to London.
G. W. Woolff	United Kingdom	The ship was driven ashore at Hooghly Point, India. She was on a voyage from Newport, Monmouthshire to Calcutta, India. She was later refloated and completed her voyage.
Harbinger	United Kingdom	The steamship was driven ashore at Baltimore, Maryland. She was on a voyage from Baltimore to Bordeaux, Gironde, France.
Hardwick	United Kingdom	The steamship was driven ashore north of Liepāja, Russia.
Hettie	United Kingdom	The stern-board and part of the keel of the steamship was washed ashore at Trevone Bay, Cornwall on 9 January.
Invermark	United Kingdom	The schooner was driven ashore at Filey, Yorkshire. She was on a voyage from London to South Shields, County Durham. She was refloated and towed in to Scarborough, Yorkshire in a leaky condition.
Isabella Helen	United Kingdom	The ship was driven ashore at Kalamata, Greece.
Japan	United Kingdom	The steamship was driven ashore at Hooghly Point.
John	United Kingdom	The schooner was driven ashore between "Silker" and St. Bees, Cumberland. Her crew were rescued.
John and Sarah	United Kingdom	The Thames barge sank off Sheerness. Her crew survived.
Juno	Germany	The barque was wrecked on Flores Island, Netherlands East Indies.
Kate	United Kingdom	The ketch was driven ashore at Selsey, Sussex. She was refloated on 17 January and taken in to Littlehampton, Sussex.
Kestrel	United Kingdom	The brig was driven ashore and wrecked at King's Cross Point, Isle of Arran. She was on a voyage from Maryport, Cumberland to Londonderry.
Leslie	United Kingdom	The schooner ran aground at Pembroke Dock, Pembrokeshire and was severely damaged. She was on a voyage from Millbay, Devon to Pembroke Dock.
Louise	Germany	The barque was driven ashore and wrecked at Lyngør, Norway. She was on a voyage from Danzig to Rochefort, Charente-Inférieure, France.
Mary Jane	United Kingdom	The schooner foundered off Fishguard, Pembrokeshire.
Mary J. Leslie	Flag unknown	The ship was driven ashore at Corinto. She was refloated and put back to Corinto in a leaky condition.
Matthew Bedlington	United Kingdom	The steamship was damaged by fire at Newport News, Virginia, United States.
Mina	United Kingdom	The ship was driven ashore between Bootle and Eskmeals, Cumberland. Her crew were rescued. She was on a voyage from the River Duddon to Saltney, Cheshire.
Mira Flores	United Kingdom	The ship was driven ashore on Rottnest Island, Western Australia. She was on a voyage form London to Fremantle, Western Australia.
Native	United Kingdom	The schooner was driven ashore and wrecked at Ringfade Point, County Down. Her crew were rescued.
Norman	Sweden	The brigantine was wrecked in the Torres Strait. Her crew were rescued.
N. Thayer	United States	The ship was destroyed by fire at sea. Her crew were rescued. She was on a voyage from Manila, Spanish East Indies to New York.
Panormos	Ottoman Empire	The steamship ran aground near Cassandreia, Kingdom of Greece.
Picton Castle	New South Wales	The ship was driven ashore. She was refloated and taken in to Haiphong, French Indo-China, where she arrived on 23 January.
Pilgrim	United Kingdom	The schooner was driven ashore at Patras, Greece.
Queen	United Kingdom	The ship ran aground in the Ship Channel. She was on a voyage from New York to London. She was refloated and put back to New York.
Roseland	United Kingdom	The steamship ran aground in the Clyde. She was later refloated.
Sainte Anne	France	The schooner foundered at sea with the loss of her captain. Survivors were rescued by the steamship City of Edinburgh (United Kingdom).
Star of Italy	United Kingdom	The ship arrived at Calcutta on fire. She was on a voyage from London to Calcutta.
Strathay	United Kingdom	The barque struck a rock in Hell Gate and was beached on Rikers Island, New York, United States.
Surprise	Denmark	The smack was driven ashore in Papa Sound. She was refloated and taken in to Stronsay, Orkney Islands, United Kingdom.
Surprise	United States	The barque was wrecked on the coast of Madagascar. All on board were rescued by the barque Notre Dame de la Garde (France). The wreck was plundered and burnt by the local inhabitants.
Tage	France	The steamship was wrecked on "Barracouta Island", Madagascar before 25 January. All on board were rescued.
Two Brothers	United Kingdom	The schooner foundered in the English Channel. Her crew were rescued.
Vencedora	United Kingdom	The Mersey Flat ran aground on the Brazil Bank, in the River Mersey.
Victoria	United Kingdom	The barquentine ran aground on the Maplin Sands, in the North Sea off the coast of Essex and was abandoned by her crew.
Viscaya	United Kingdom	The ship was driven ashore. She was on a voyage from South Shields, County Durham to Waterford. She was refloated and towed in to Harwich, Essex in a leaky condition by the steamship Robert Owen (United Kingdom).
Vorwarts	Germany	The barque was driven ashore at Bahía Blanca, Argentina.
Welcombe	United Kingdom	The steamship was driven ashore 18 nautical miles (33 km) east of Port Albert, Natal Colony. Salvage attempts were abandoned on 23 February.
William	United Kingdom	The ship was driven ashore and wrecked at Galveston, Texas, United States. Her crew were rescued.
Unnamed	Flag unknown	The steamship sank off Ventava, Courland Governorate.
Unnamed	Flag unknown	The ship was driven ashore in a capsized condition at "Burtonpost", County Donegal, United Kingdom.
Three unnamed vessels	Greece	The ships were driven ashore at Kalamata.
