= Bailey Brook =

Bailey Brook may refer to:

- Bailey Brook (West Branch French Creek tributary), a stream in Pennsylvania, United States
- Bailey Brook, Nova Scotia, a rural community in Canada
