= Inishtrahull (1885) =

British passenger cargo ship

History

United Kingdom
- Name: Inishtrahull
- Namesake: Inishtrahull
- Owner: Clyde Shipping Company, Glasgow
- Port of registry: (United Kingdom) Glasgow
- Builder: D & W Henderson Ltd, Glasgow
- Launched: 29 June 1885
- Fate: Went missing near Kilkee, County Clare 28–29 December 1894

General characteristics
- Tonnage: 1,006.56 GRT; 483.42 NT
- Length: 231.1 ft (70.4 m)
- Beam: 33.1 ft (10.1 m)
- Depth of hold: 15.1 ft (4.6 m)
- Installed power: 240 horsepower
- Propulsion: 3-cylinder triple-expansion

The Inishtrahull was a passenger cargo vessel that sank off the coast of Kilkee, County Clare between 28 and 29 December 1894. After leaving Glasgow, Scotland with a consignment of coal for Limerick city on 27 December 1894, the ship ran into difficulty somewhere near Kilkee and foundered due to the heavy gales reported along the west coast of Ireland in late December of that year. This was confirmed on 3 January 1895 when a section of a port bow marked "Glasgow" was picked up near Kilkee.

== Early years ==
Built in 1885, the ship was a steel-made, steam-powered vessel used for both cargo and passenger services. At the time of launch the vessel was fitted with all modern appliances, including accommodation for 40 first-class passengers and room to carry cattle on the main deck and lower decks. In October 1892, while on a voyage from Glasgow to Cork with about 250 tons of goods, the ship developed a heavy list after meeting heavy storms and arrived in Cork harbour nearly keeling over.

== Collision with the Maggie ==
On 29 December 1891, the Inishtrahull was involved in a collision with an Irish sailing vessel from Dublin named the Maggie. The collision occurred in the Irish Sea, just off the Kish Bank. It was found in an investigation afterwards that the fault laid squarely in the hands of the second officer of the Inishtrahull, who left the bridge without a competent officer in charge (a carpenter was left alone on the bridge). After the collision the second officer was suspended from duty for two years. As all the crew had been evacuated and the vessel was taking on water, the Maggie was believed to have sunk somewhere around the Kish Lighthouse around 52°41.4′N 09°40.6′W.

== Sinking ==
Leaving Glasgow Port on the morning of 28 December 1894, the ship was scheduled to arrive in Limerick on 30 December. After being missing for six days it was assumed that due to the storms blowing on the 28th, the ship had taken shelter and wasn't in a position to telegraph its whereabouts. On 3 January 1895, however, a section of a port bow from a ship with a brass plate marked "Glasgow" was picked up by the Kilkee coastguards near the town and reported to the Receiver of Wrecks in Limerick. This was not proven to be from the missing ship until 8 January when The Clyde Shipping Company abandoned the search for the ship and released the names of those thought to be aboard, coming to 26 including the captain, Thomas Whip.

== See also ==
- Edmond, "coffin ship" that sank in a storm in Kilkee Bay in 1850
- Fulmar, coal ship from Scotland to Limerick, sank in a gale up the coast from Kilkee in 1886
- List of maritime disasters
