= Fulmar (1868) =

British cargo ship

History

United Kingdom
- Name: Fulmar
- Namesake: (northern) fulmar
- Owner: James Dixon
- Port of registry: (United Kingdom) Middlesbrough, North Yorkshire
- Builder: Backhouse & Dixon Middlesbrough
- Launched: 1 February 1868
- Fate: Sunk near Farrihy Bay, Kilkee, County Clare 30 January 1886

General characteristics
- Class & type: Iron screw steamship
- Tonnage: 652 GRT
- Length: 200 ft (61 m)
- Beam: 28 ft (8.5 m)
- Installed power: 90 horsepower
- Propulsion: 2-cylinder compound inverted steam engine

The Fulmar was a cargo vessel that sank in the Atlantic Ocean off Kilkee, County Clare, Ireland, on the night of 30 January 1886. At the time of the disaster the ship was transporting coal from Troon in Ayrshire, Scotland to Limerick city in Ireland. Occurring 50 years to the day of the sinking of the Intrinsic, the ship is one of four that have perished with loss of life off the coast of the small town of Kilkee, the others being the Edmond, and the Inishtrahull.

== Background ==
Originally built for Francis Atkinson in 1868, Fulmar was bought in 1877 by Middlesbrough businessman James Dixon. The sinking was not the first time it had been en-toiled in trouble, with the ship running aground near the French town of Boulogne-sur-Mer in 1883. After this the ship required extensive repairs, with the bill eventually coming to around £6,000 (£300,000 today). The ship was then laid up in the Royal Victoria Dock in London for two years, being used only for a few coastal voyages in the intervening period. The port side of the ship suffered damage when lying in Dún Laoghaire harbour in 1885 and on its return to Troon in Scotland, began to leak. When the vessel arrived in Troon harbour it was given temporary repairs and a decision was made that it would continue on to Limerick, as it had been chartered, and when it returned it would be sent to Cardiff for a full overhaul and repair.

== Last voyage and sinking ==
Fulmar left Troon on the afternoon of 28 January 1886 with a crew of 17 aboard. On the ship at the time was 809 tons 11 cwt. of coal bound for Limerick and 55 tons 5 cwt. in the vessel's bunkers. According to the wreck report compiled after the disaster the ship was listing considerably on the starboard side due to it having 10 to 12 tons more coal than the port bunker. In ordinary circumstances the ship should have completed its journey in approximately 50 hours, making her estimated arrival in Limerick on 30 January at 18.30pm. During the night of the 30th and the early morning of the 31st, gale-force winds of between 9 and 10 were reported along the west coast of Ireland and it is believed that Fulmar foundered in these, not helped by the fact that it was already listing. What had happened only came to knowledge on 31 January when a quantity of wreckage identified as belonging to the Fulmar was picked up near Kilkee, a town located about 22 km from the entrance to the River Shannon, the ship's intended route. On 4 February, the body of a person, believed to have been Captain Webb, washed ashore. This was the only victim of the 17 aboard to be recovered. It is believed the ship foundered in an approximate position of 52°43′N 09°37.5′W.

== See also ==
- Edmond
- Inishtrahull
- List of maritime disasters
