= Margaret MacDonald (nurse) =

Canadian military nurse (1873–1948)

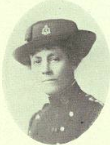
- Born: 26 February 1873; Bailey Brook, Nova Scotia
- Died: 7 September 1948 (aged 75); Bailey Brook, Nova Scotia
- Military career
- Allegiance: Canada
- Rank: Major
- Commands: Canadian Army Medical Corps Nursing Service
- Conflicts: Second Boer War; First World War
- Awards: Royal Red Cross; Florence Nightingale Medal

Major Margaret Clothilde MacDonald, RRC (26 February 1873 – 7 September 1948) was a Canadian military nurse, serving in the Second Boer War and the First World War. MacDonald held the title of Matron-in-Chief of the Canadian Army Medical Corps Nursing Service, the first woman promoted to the rank of major in the British Empire and was awarded the Royal Red Cross (1916) and the Florence Nightingale Medal (1918).

MacDonald was born into a wealthy, Catholic family in Bailey Brook, Nova Scotia in 1873. Her father was a store owner and provided MacDonald the opportunity to receive an education from an early age, atypical for girls of that time. After graduation, MacDonald went to practice in Panama before beginning her first military nursing work aboard the military ship, USS Relief during the Spanish-American War in 1898.

== Early life and education ==
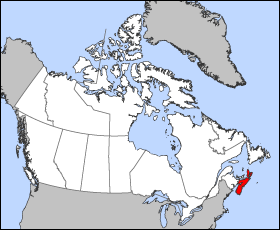
Map of Canada (Nova Scotia indicated in red)

Margaret MacDonald was born on 26 February 1873, in Bailey's Brook, Pictou County, Nova Scotia, the third child of Mary Elizabeth Chisholm and Donald St. Daniel MacDonald. MacDonald was born the day before her mother's 24th birthday. Between 1868 and 1879, Mary Elizabeth gave birth to eleven children, nine of which survived into adulthood; six girls and three boys.

MacDonald was born into a relatively wealthy Catholic family. Both of her parents descended from the Scottish Highlands and her great-grandparents made their way from Scotland to Nova Scotia in the late 1700s. MacDonald's mother was a housewife and her father owned a general store in town. This store was the area's only source of farm products and imported goods from Montreal, the United States, and Great Britain. This store, paired with Donald's aptitude with finances, was a great source of income for the MacDonald family and accounted for the family's wealth.

Her family's wealth provided MacDonald with many opportunities that were uncommon for women of her time. MacDonald received a good education for a girl of the time period, including reading, writing, arithmetic, geography and grammar. MacDonald's mother placed great importance on education during her upbringing and played a big role in MacDonald and her siblings' learning. This upbringing caused MacDonald to greatly value education.

After her primary education at Stella Maris Convent School in Pictou, MacDonald followed her older sisters to Mount St. Vincent Academy in 1890, a convent school where she was taught by the Sisters of Charity. Here, she gained an interest in nursing. In order to pursue this interest, MacDonald continued her educational journey at Charity Hospital Training School in New York, where she was trained as a nurse. She graduated from Charity Hospital Training School in 1895.

== Career ==
MacDonald's first nursing job was in Panama, where she served for 18 months during the construction of the Panama Canal. During construction, she cared for those involved in the effort and the surrounding area. In 1896, MacDonald contracted malaria, which was prevalent in Panama at the time. She was promptly treated and recovered, but she decided to move on from Panama.

MacDonald's first job affiliated with the military was aboard the military ship USS Relief during the Spanish–American War in 1898. Here, she cared for American soldiers that were either sick or wounded in the war. Soon after, MacDonald also served as a nurse during the South African War in 1900, where she was one of the first women to receive a military commission.

After her involvement with the South African War, MacDonald returned to Canada, where she was soon named the head nurse of the Canadian Army Medical Corps. As head nurse, MacDonald was in charge of the admission process and sought to keep a high reputation for the corps and did not allow nurses to serve unless they had proper, professional training. Her requirements were not very common in a time when most women did not receive a formal education. There were many volunteer nurses seeking involvement that were not formally trained; MacDonald, attempting to maintain the integrity and reputation of the rapidly advancing military nursing profession, would not allow these nurses to join the nursing corps. MacDonald became known as a military nursing leader and for opposing gender expectations of the time. MacDonald worked to make a place for women in the male-dominated military.

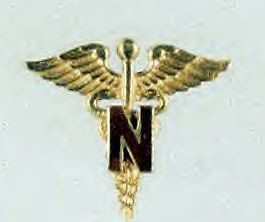
Military Nurse Badge

The First World War marked a big change in MacDonald's military career. She had moved to Britain to develop leadership skills from their military nursing program. She wanted to make a change for the women and challenge the gender roles of the time. In 1914, she was named matron in chief of a group of military nurses that, during the war, would accumulate to over 3000 nurses. MacDonald was the first woman to be given the title of Matron-in-Chief in the British Empire. During the war, MacDonald was the first woman promoted to the rank of major in the British Empire for her leadership during the First World War. MacDonald was responsible for planning every move of her cadre of nurses. She had to ensure their safe and secure transportation, living conditions, and health.

MacDonald returned to Canada in 1919, and was soon named the head of the Nursing Service of the Canadian Army Medical Corps. In her role, she aided in reorganizing the Royal Canadian Army Medical Corps. MacDonald retired in 1920, returning to her home town of Bailey's Brook, Nova Scotia. MacDonald died on 7 September 1948, at the age of 75.

== Awards ==
- Royal Red Cross (1916)
- Florence Nightingale Medal (1918)
- Honorary DDL from Saint Francis Xavier University (1983)
