= Bailey Brook, Nova Scotia =

Community in Nova Scotia, Canada

Coordinates: 45°39′36.67″N 62°16′31.44″W

Bailey's Brook in Nova Scotia

Bailey Brook, also referred to as Bailey's Brook was a dispersed rural community in the Canadian province of Nova Scotia, located in Pictou County. The name was officially rescinded in 1961. Originally known as Baillies Brook, the area was settled by Scottish immigrants in 1790 and again in 1802. It was the childhood home of military nurse Margaret C. MacDonald.
