= Kilkee =

Seaside resort in County Clare, Ireland

Kilkee Irish: Cill Chaoi
- Town
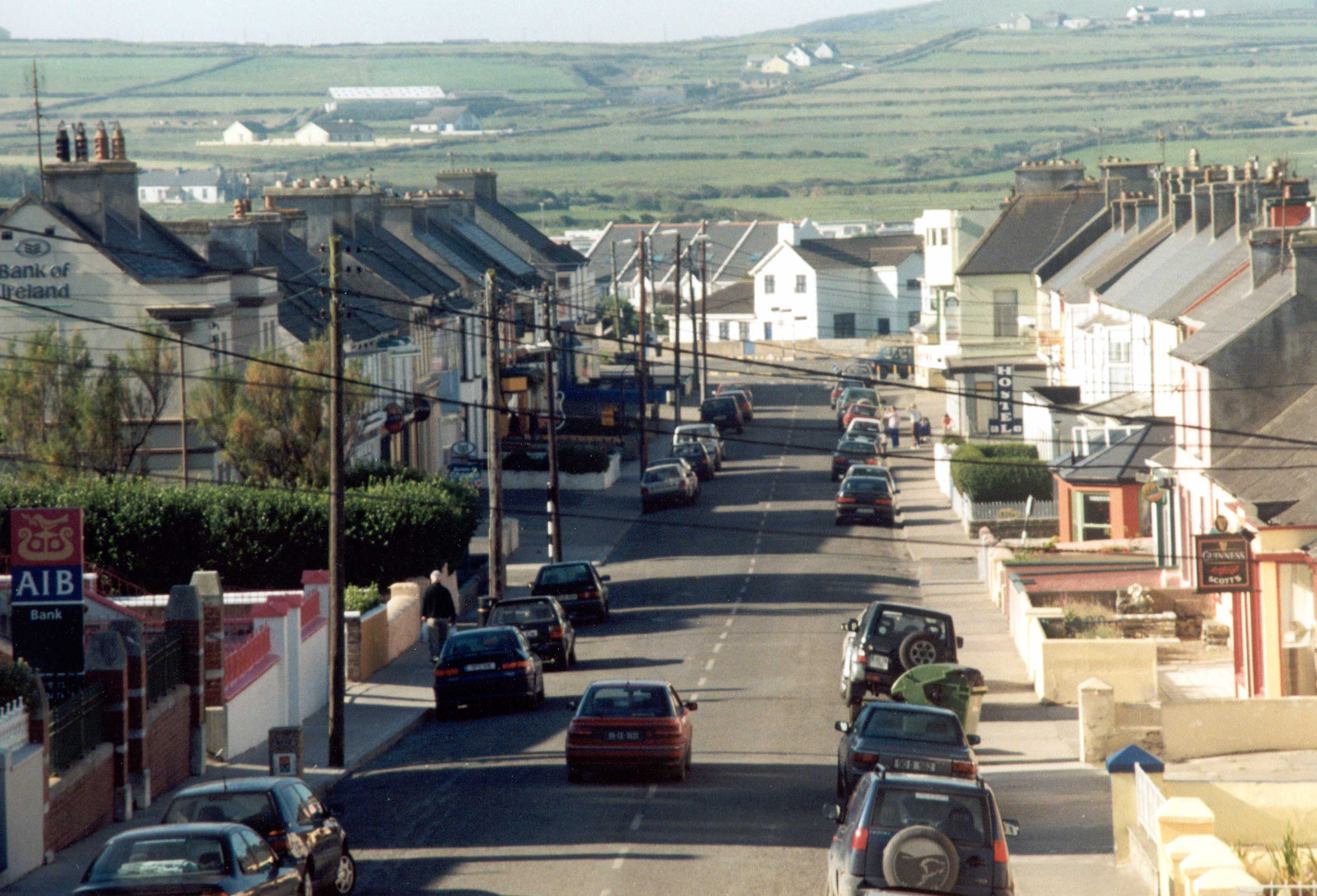
- O'Curry Street in 2006

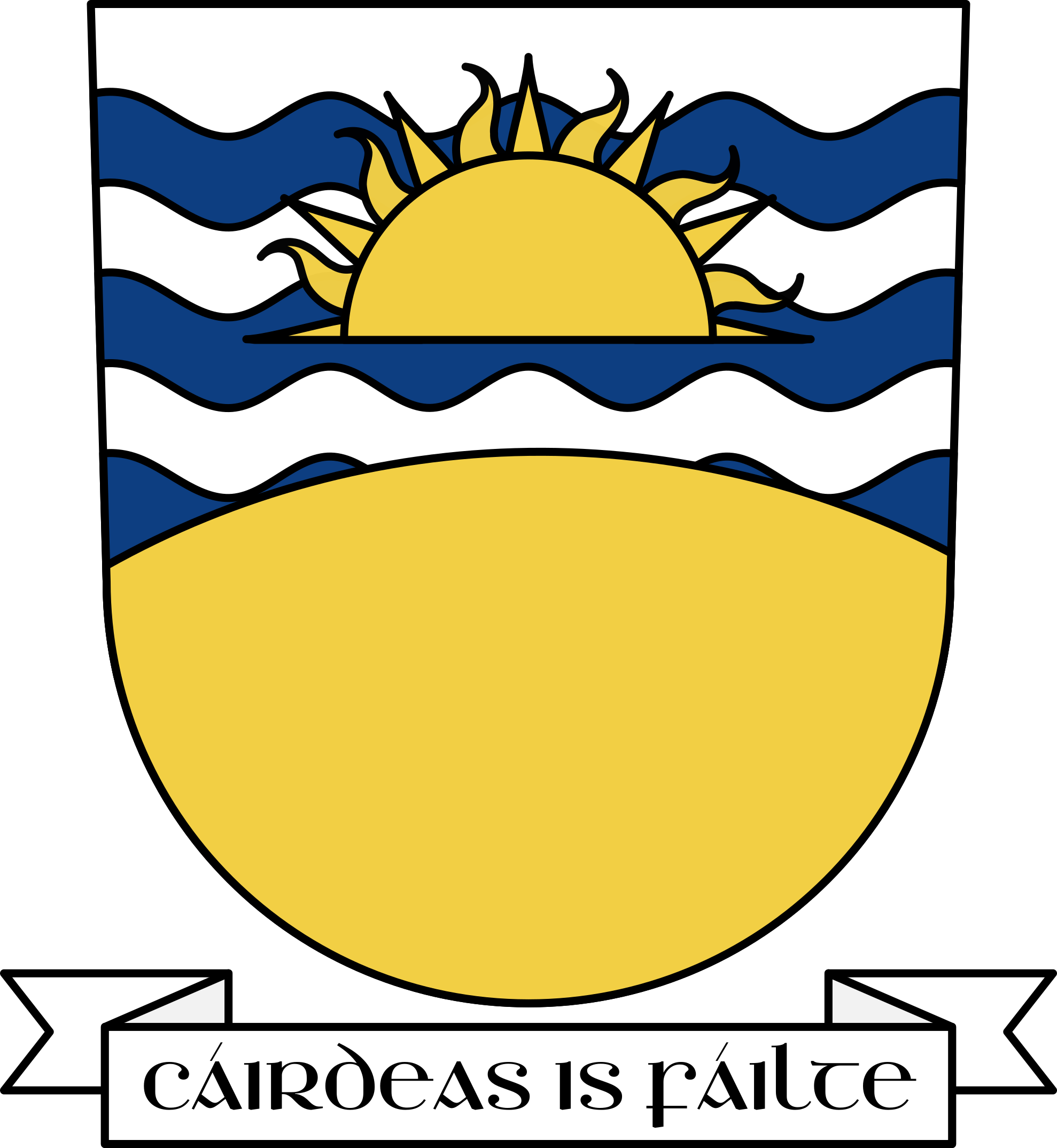
- Coat of arms

- Location in Ireland
- Coordinates: 52.679°N 9.647°W
- Country: Ireland
- Province: Munster
- County: County Clare

Area
  - Total: 5.24 km^{2} (2.02 sq mi)

Population (2022)
  - Total: 1,214
- Time zone: UTC±0 (WET)
  - Summer (DST): UTC+1 (IST)
- Eircode routing key: V15
- Telephone area code: +353(0)65
- Irish Grid Reference: Q885601
- Website: kilkee.ie

Historical population
Year	Pop.	±%
1821	409	—
1831	1,051	+157.0%
1841	1,481	+40.9%
1851	1,860	+25.6%
1861	1,856	−0.2%
1871	1,605	−13.5%
1881	1,652	+2.9%
1891	1,839	+11.3%
1901	1,762	−4.2%
1911	1,688	−4.2%
1926	1,682	−0.4%
1936	1,863	+10.8%
1946	1,804	−3.2%
1951	1,677	−7.0%
1956	1,565	−6.7%
1961	1,392	−11.1%
1966	1,377	−1.1%
1971	1,287	−6.5%
1981	1,389	+7.9%
1986	1,448	+4.2%
1991	1,315	−9.2%
1996	1,331	+1.2%
2002	1,260	−5.3%
2006	1,325	+5.2%
2011	1,024	−22.7%
2016	972	−5.1%
2022	1,214	+24.9%

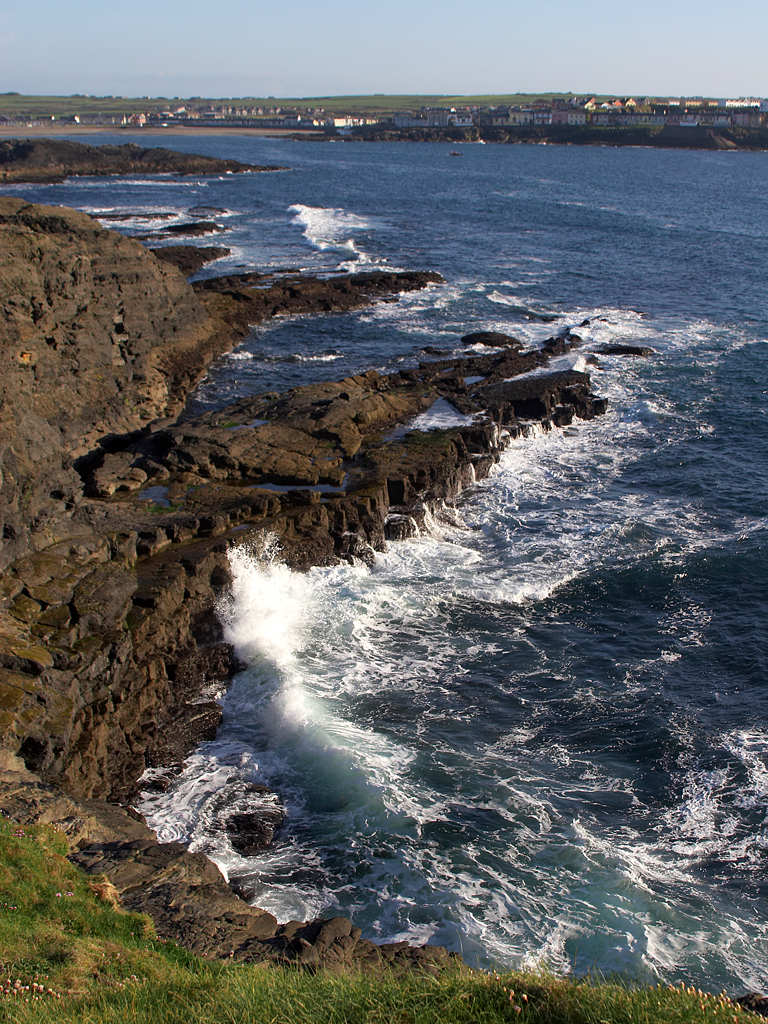
Kilkee cliffs

Kilkee (Irish: Cill Chaoi) is a coastal town in County Clare, Ireland. It is located in the parish of Kilkee (formerly Kilfearagh). Kilkee is midway between Kilrush and Doonbeg on the N67 road and is a popular seaside resort. The horseshoe bay is protected from the Atlantic Ocean by the Duggerna Reef.

== History ==
In the early 19th century, Kilkee was a small fishing village. Around the 1820s, a paddle steamer service from Limerick to Kilrush made Kilkee more accessible as a tourist destination, particularly for the Anglo-Irish aristocracy. Catty Fitzgerald opened the first hotel, which operated for 40 years. By the 1830s, two more hotels opened in Kilkee. Along with these, three churches were built, a Roman Catholic church in 1831, a Protestant church in 1843, and a Methodist church in 1900.

Descriptions of Kilkee during the Irish Famine can be found in John Manners’s travel narrative Notes of an Irish Tour, in 1846 and Sydney Godolphin Osborne's Gleanings in the West of Ireland, originally published in 1850. These describe a provincial town primarily attractive for landscapes and sea-bathing.

In the 1890s, Kilkee experienced a population boom when the West Clare Railway opened, which facilitated the transportation of goods and people. Many prominent people travelled to Kilkee during this time, including Sir Aubrey de Vere, Charlotte Brontë, Sir Henry Rider Haggard, and Alfred, Lord Tennyson. In 1896, the Crown Princess of Austria visited the town. The entertainer Percy French was a regular performer in the town and an incident on the West Clare Railway on the way to Kilkee prompted him to write the song "Are Ye Right There Michael".

Kilkee has regularly been awarded the Blue Flag by the European Commission. In 2006, a statue of Richard Harris was unveiled in Kilkee by actor Russell Crowe.

=== Shipwrecks around Kilkee ===
On 30 January 1836, the Intrinsic, a ship from Liverpool bound for New Orleans, was blown into a bay near Bishops Island in Kilkee. The ship was damaged against the cliffs and sank along with her crew of 14, of whom none survived. The shipwreck site is now called 'Intrinsic Bay'.

A chartered passenger sailing vessel named the Edmond sank at Edmond Point on 19 November 1850. The ship was sailing from Limerick to New York City but was driven into Kilkee Bay by a storm. Due to high tides, the ship was driven to Edmond Point, where it split in two. Of the 216 on board, 98 drowned in the disaster.

Exactly 50 years to the day after the Intrinsic sank, on 30 January 1886, the Fulmar sank just north of Kilkee in an area known as Farrihy Bay. The ship was a cargo vessel transporting coal from Troon in Scotland to Limerick, but never reached its destination. Of the 17 crew members aboard only one body was ever recovered.

At some point between 28 and 29 December 1894, the Inishtrahull went missing somewhere near the Kilkee coast. At the time of the disappearance, the ship was transporting a consignment of coal from Glasgow to Limerick but never reached its intended destination. The ship was only confirmed to have sunk on 3 January 1985, when a section of a port bow from a ship with a brass plate marked "Glasgow" was picked up by the Kilkee coastguard.

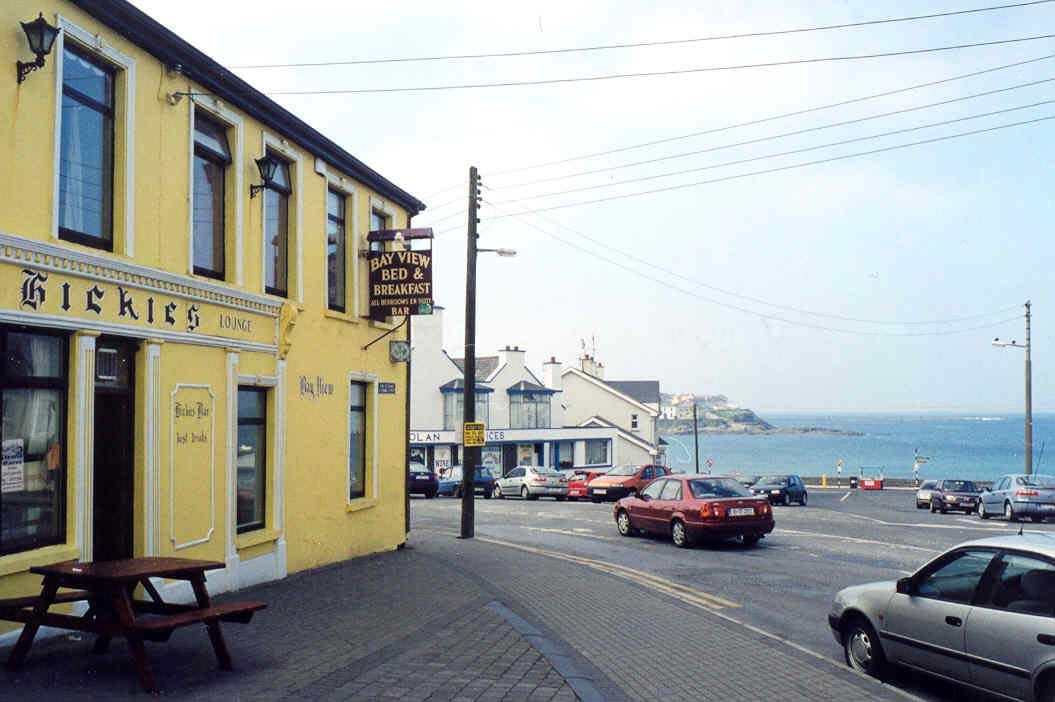
A view of the bay from Hickie's pub

== Culture ==
Between 2007 and 2009, Kilkee was host to the Cois Fharraige music and surfing festival.

== Sport and recreation ==
As well as bathing on the Strand, beachgoers can choose from the Pollock Holes, New Found Out, and Byrnes Cove. The Pollock Holes, also known as Duggerna Reef, are three natural rock-enclosed pools with water that change with every tide. This brings in fresh water and replenishes the marine life in the many rock pools surrounding it. The diving boards at New Found Out allow up to 13 meters (45 feet) into the open sea. The annual diving competition is held at these boards.

Every year, there are many participants in the Bay Swim, a race roughly a mile from the east end of the town to the west across the bay. The race starts at Byrnes Cove, a sheltered cove close to George's Head, a prominent headland in the city. In 2011, nearly 200 people took part in the swim. There is also a mini Bay Swim for children under fourteen from Sandy Cove to the Pier. The last weekend in June sees an influx of triathletes as Kilkee hosts the 'Hell of the West Triathlon', the longest-running triathlon in the country. This is one of the biggest and toughest triathlons on the Irish Triathlon calendar, with upwards of 600 athletes taking part in a 1500-metre swim, 45 km cycle, and finishing with a 10 km road race.

A version of racquetball (not squash, as is often incorrectly stated) has been played against the high sandstone walls in the West End for generations, and it is possible that the rules were codified in Kilkee before racquetball was standardized anywhere else. The main trophy, the Tivoli cup, was first competed for in Kilkee in 1935; racquetball in its current form was not codified internationally until 1950. Richard Harris, who would go on to become an internationally known actor, won the cup four years in a row, from 1948 to 1951, a record surpassed by no one to this day.

The Strand Races are horse races contested annually on the Kilkee strand. They first began in the 19th century on the sand hills where the golf club is now. The races are normally held over two days in September when the summer season is drawing to a close. The course is made by placing poles on the beach and when the tide goes out the races begin. Traditionally it was a celebration for farmers when the harvesting season was over.

A short-lived greyhound racing track was opened by the Kilkee Greyhound Racing Company on 2 July 1936. The land and assets of the track (behind the Olympia Hall and Merton Square) were put up for sale in 1942.

== Transport ==
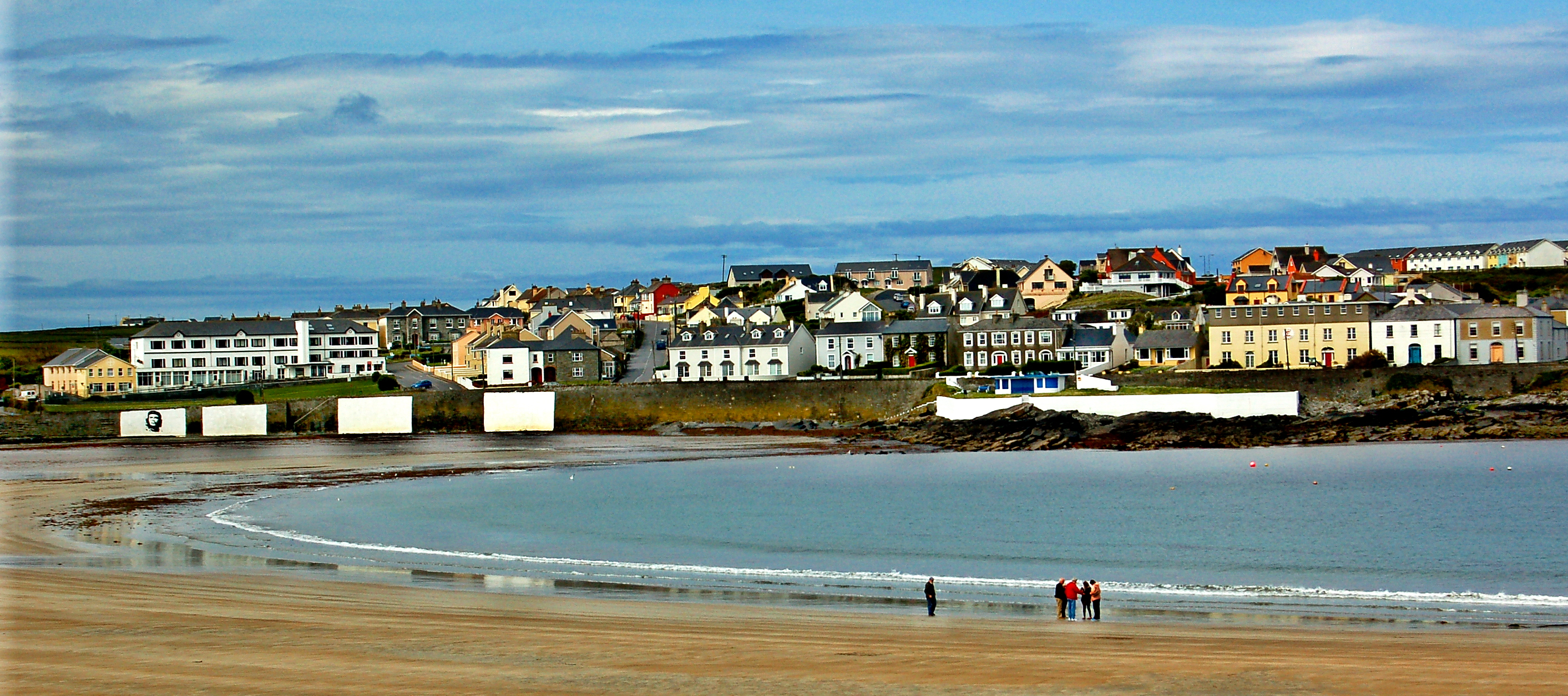
Kilkee Strand

Before the West Clare Railway opened in 1887, the only way to get to the town was by paddle steamer from Limerick to Kilrush and then by horse and cart from there. This service ran from 1816 until 1918 but was stopped after World War I due to the popularity of the railway, although for many years the railway and steamer services ran together with a special "Steamer Express" train to and from Kilkee. After the railway closed in 1961, the only way to get to the resort was by car but as the mainline rail system now connects Limerick and Galway to Ennis, it is still possible to get the train as far as Ennis. Although the only bus routes offered by Bus Éireann from Kilkee are to Kilrush and Ennis, it is possible to get to Limerick, Cork or even Dublin through connecting buses or trains.

For international visitors, the closest airport is in Shannon.

== See also ==
- List of towns and villages in Ireland
- List of tourist attractions in Ireland
