= Edmond (1833) =

Irish shipwreck

History

British North America
- Name: Edmond
- Owner: John Arnott and George Cannock
- Port of registry: Saint John, New Brunswick
- Builder: Granville, Nova Scotia
- Launched: 1833
- Fate: Wrecked off the Duggerna Rocks in Kilkee, County Clare 19 November 1850

General characteristics
- Class & type: 3-masted barque
- Tonnage: 399 GRT
- Length: 112 ft 8 in (34.34 m)
- Beam: 28 ft (8.5 m)

The Edmond was a chartered passenger sailing vessel that sank off the coast of Kilkee, County Clare on 19 November 1850. It was built in 1833 in Granville, Nova Scotia, a small community near Annapolis Royal, a town that became famous for wooden shipbuilding during the 1800s. At the time of the disaster it was owned by John Arnott and George Cannock, who co-owned the Arnotts department store. Today there is a commemorative plaque engraved on the sea wall just beside the wreck site, in an area now known as Edmond Point.

== Background ==
Due to the Great Irish Famine, which lasted from 1845 to 1852, thousands of people emigrated from Ireland every week on ships known as "coffin ships". During these years Limerick port was the point of emigration for many people from counties Limerick, Clare and Tipperary. One of the ships that carried people across the Atlantic was the 3-masted barque Edmond. Normally based in London, the ship was chartered for the year by Limerick businessman, John McDonnell. As 1850 was beginning to draw to a close, and as the weather became more and more dangerous, ships were still crossing due to the demand for passage to the New World.

== Sinking ==
=== Voyage ===
"What was my horror to see before me, within a few hundred yards a large vessel aground some distance from the rocks. It was low water; I cannot describe my feeling. I knew and felt that all in her were doomed to destruction and, as I then believed, not a soul would be saved."

— Mr Richard Russell, quoted in The Clare Journal, 21 November 1850

After returning from Quebec, Canada with a cargo of timber, the ship set sail from Limerick on Friday, 15 November 1850. On the ship at the time were 195 passengers and a crew of 21, including the captain John Wilson and first mate William Thompson. The ship sailed down the Shannon River and on the 17th, anchored at Carrigaholt for the night. On the 18th, the ship left the river and sailed past Loop Head into the Atlantic. After a full day of sailing, a fierce winter storm struck, blowing the ship back towards the Clare coast. The captain's attempts to steer the brig back up the Shannon were futile, as the gale had destroyed the sails and two of the three masts were lost. By Tuesday 19 November all attempts at keeping the ship away from the shore ended in failure and at around 11 pm that night, she was blown into Kilkee Bay.

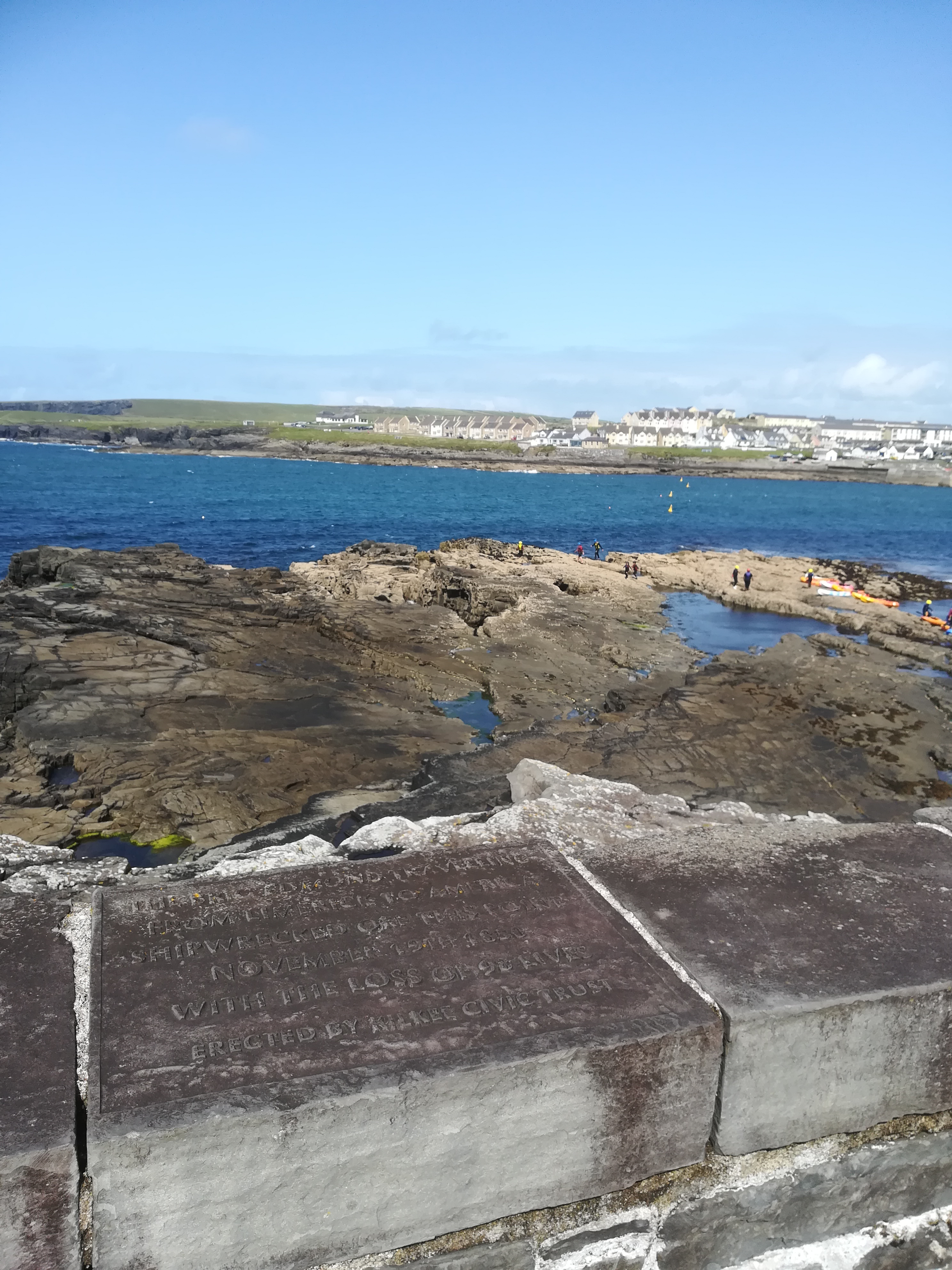
Commemorative plaque for the Edmond located at the site of the wreck in Kilkee, County Clare, Ireland

At first the ship ran aground on the reef at the mouth of the bay, now called the Pollack Holes, but as the tide was very high, the wind drove the ship further into the bay and eventually onto the rocks less than 50 metres (160 ft) from Sykes House. As the ship foundered so close to the shore, Mr Richard Russell, the owner of Sykes House, and his servant Henry Likely rushed down to the rocks to help. When the captain saw the lights of these two men, and saw that the rocks were passable, he ordered the third mast to be cut down and to be used as a gangway for the passengers and crew to escape to the rocks. Mr Russell was soon joined by three members of the Clare Coast Guard, and they began to assist the passengers from the rocks and onto the land below Sykes House. All the time the tide was rising and after about 100 people had been landed on the rock, it became impossible to assist more.

At around 3 am, as the power of the waves increased and the tide rose, the ship started to break apart. This started a panic for the passengers still on the stricken ship and many were swept away trying to escape to the rocks. The ship then broke loose from the rocks and drifted towards the beach with many still clinging to the vessel. As it got too close to the shore it keeled over and many people still inside the ship drowned, the rest being thrown over the side and forced to swim to the shore. The captain and the first mate stayed with the ship until the end and escaped to safety.

=== Aftermath ===
As everything had been done to help the passengers, and when nothing else could be done to save them, Mr Russell and people from all over Kilkee took in survivors from the disaster for the night. The next morning the extent of the disaster became apparent with bodies and wreckage strewn across the whole beach. As the day wore on it became known that of the 216 aboard, 98 lost their lives and 118 were saved. All day, bodies washed up on the beach and in the end 54 bodies were recovered. Most of the deceased were buried in the nearby Kilfiera graveyard. To help the survivors, a subscription was held with businessmen from all over Ireland and England contributing to it. In the end over £300 was raised, all going to the survivors and to the next of kin of the dead. As Ireland was in the middle of a famine, many poor people looted the ship, with some going as far as stripping the clothes from the dead.
