= 1876 in Ireland =

- Centuries: 17th; 18th; 19th; 20th; 21st
- Decades: 1850s; 1860s; 1870s; 1880s; 1890s
- See also: 1876 in the United Kingdom; Other events of 1876; List of years in Ireland

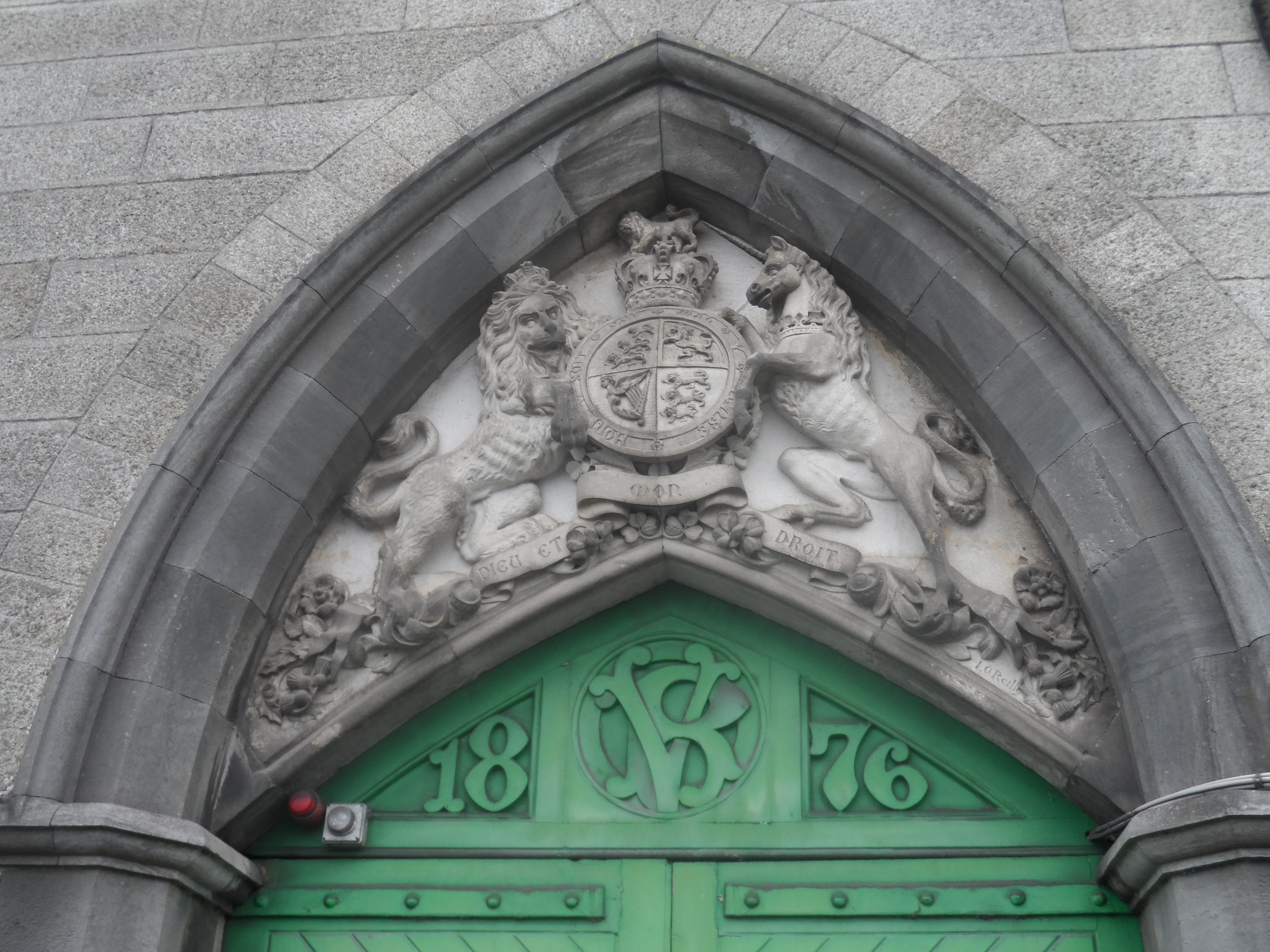
Doorway on Waterford quays, depicting the year 1876 and the royal arms.

Events from the year 1876 in Ireland.

== Events ==
- 26 January – Dublin Women's Suffrage Association established.
- 1 April – Great Northern Railway (Ireland) formed by a merger of the Irish North Western Railway, Northern Railway of Ireland and the Ulster Railway.
- June – Dublin Artisans' Dwellings Company established.
- 29 December – Society for the Preservation of the Irish Language established.
- Return of Owners of Land in Ireland made.
- St. Michael's Hospital (Dún Laoghaire) established by the Sisters of Mercy.
- Grangegorman Military Cemetery opens in Dublin.

== Arts and literature ==
Henry Albert Hartland's 1876 landscape painting On the moors, Achill Island, Co. Mayo, Ireland

- March – George Bernard Shaw moves permanently from Dublin to England.
- Earliest published version of the song "Molly Malone", in Boston, Massachusetts.
- Song "Rose of Killarney" composed by John Rogers Thomas in the United States.

== Sport ==
- July – First All Ireland Lawn Tennis Championships held in Dublin.
- First Ulster Schools' Cup (rugby union) competition.
- Sports clubs established: Clontarf Cricket Club, Clontarf F.C. (rugby union), Mountmellick Athletic Club, St Finbarr's National Hurling & Football Club (Cork).

== Births ==
- 5 January – Lucien Bull, pioneer in chronophotography (died 1972 in France).
- 21 January
  - James Charles Brady, Canadian politician (died 1962 in Canada).
  - James Larkin, trade union leader, socialist and Irish Labour Party TD, in Liverpool (died 1947).
- 25 February – Philip Graves, journalist and writer (died 1953).
- 11 April – Paul Henry, artist (died 1958).
- 14 June – George Townshend, writer, clergyman and Baháʼí (died 1957).
- 27 June – Gladys Wynne, landscape watercolourist (died 1968).
- 3 August – Sep Lambert, cricketer (died 1959).
- 22 October – Feardorcha Ó Conaill, Gaelic scholar (died 1929)
  Full date unknown
  - Cissie Cahalan, trade unionist, feminist and suffragette (died 1948).
  - Frederick James Walker, motor cycle racer (killed at 1914 Isle of Man TT races).

== Deaths ==
- 15 February – Daniel Pollen, politician, ninth Premier of New Zealand (born 1813).
- 19 April – William Wilde, surgeon, author and father of Oscar Wilde (born 1815).
- 7 May – Joseph Philip Ronayne, civil engineer (born 1822).
- 16 June – Sir Henry Thomas, police magistrate in London (born 1807).
- 25 June – Myles Keogh, officer in American Civil War, later in U.S. 7th Cavalry Regiment, killed at the Battle of the Little Bighorn (born 1840).
- 14 July – James Henry, physician, classical scholar and poet (born 1798).

== See also ==
- 1876 in Scotland
- 1876 in Wales
