= 1814 in Ireland =

- Centuries: 17th; 18th; 19th; 20th; 21st
- Decades: 1790s; 1800s; 1810s; 1820s; 1830s
- See also: 1814 in the United Kingdom; Other events of 1814; List of years in Ireland

Events from the year 1814 in Ireland.

== Events ==
- 1 February – Royal Belfast Academical Institution opened as a school and college.
- 18 June – improved navigation of River Shannon between Limerick and Killaloe opens.
- 25 December – inauguration of Chapel Royal, Dublin, designed by Francis Johnston.
- Apprentice Boys of Derry Club formed (although the siege of Derry has been celebrated from the 17th century).
- William Shaw Mason's A Statistical Account or Parochial Survey of Ireland, drawn up from the communications of the clergy begins publication in Dublin.

== Arts and literature ==
- 27 May – Harriet Smithson makes her stage debut at the Crow Street Theatre, Dublin, as Albina Mandeville in Frederick Reynolds's The Will.
- Sydney, Lady Morgan, publishes her novel O'Donnell.

== Births ==
- 10 January – Aubrey Thomas de Vere, poet and critic (died 1902).
- 9 May – John Brougham, actor and dramatist (died 1880).
- 18 August – David Moriarty, Roman Catholic Bishop of Kerry (died 1877).
- 28 August – Sheridan Le Fanu, writer (died 1873).
- 3 September – Richard Graves MacDonnell, lawyer, judge and colonial governor (died 1881).
- 14 October – Thomas Osborne Davis, lawyer and writer, author of the song "A Nation Once Again" (died 1845).
- 3 December – William Fitzgerald, Church of Ireland Bishop of Killaloe (died 1883).
  Full date unknown
  - Daniel Devlin, businessman and City Chamberlain in New York (died 1867).
  - John Lalor, journalist and author (died 1856).
  - Mary O'Connell, nurse during the American Civil War (died 1897).
  - Charles O'Hea, Catholic Priest, baptised Ned Kelly and ministered to him before he was hanged in 1880 (died 1903).
  - John Purcell, soldier, recipient of the Victoria Cross for gallantry in 1857 at Delhi, India, later killed in action (died 1857).

== Deaths ==
- 8 May (suicide) – William Nelson Gardiner, eccentric engraver and bookseller (born 1766).
- 17 June – Henry Tresham, historical painter (born c.1751).
- 9 July – Daniel Delany, Bishop of Kildare and Leighton, founder of two Catholic religious congregations and St Patrick's College, Carlow.
- 10 August – George Ogle, politician (born 1742).
- 21 November – Juan Mackenna, soldier of fortune (born 1771).
- 9 December – Arturo O'Neill, soldier of fortune (born 1736).
- 20 December – Robert Uniacke Fitzgerald, lawyer, soldier and politician (born 1751).
- Geoffrey Font, centenarian (born 1709).

== See also ==
- 1814 in Scotland
- 1814 in Wales
