= 1819 in Ireland =

- Centuries: 17th; 18th; 19th; 20th; 21st
- Decades: 1790s; 1800s; 1810s; 1820s; 1830s
- See also: 1819 in the United Kingdom; Other events of 1819; List of years in Ireland

Events from the year 1819 in Ireland.

== Events ==
- 9 April – 7 June: Select Committee of the House of Commons inquires into the state of disease and condition of the poor in Ireland. Typhus epidemic continues.
- 3 May – Henry Grattan petitions the House of Commons of the United Kingdom in favour of Catholic emancipation.
- 26 June – first detachment of John Devereux's Irish Legion sets sail from Liverpool in the Charlotte Gambier to aid Simón Bolívar in his campaign to liberate New Granada in South America.
- 13/14 July – uxoricide of Ellen Scanlan (née Hanley, the "Colleen Bawn") and dumping of her body in the River Shannon.
- c. October – disturbances by supporters of Ribbonism.

== Arts and literature ==
- 16 April – the Belfast Harp Society is reconstituted as the Irish Harp Society.
- Publication of William Parnell's Maurice and Berghetta, or, the priest of Rahery: a tale anonymously in London.

== Births ==
- January – William Travers, lawyer, politician, explorer, and naturalist in New Zealand (died 1903).
- 31 January – William Pakenham, 4th Earl of Longford, soldier and politician (died 1887).
- 1 March – Mother Vincent Whitty, nun (died 1892).
- 30 March – Bartholomew Woodlock, Roman Catholic Bishop of Ardagh (died 1902).
- 31 March – Edward Selby Smyth, British General, commanded Militia of Canada from 1874 to 1880 (died 1896).
- 1 May – Jimmy Corcoran, emigrant to Manhattan (died 1900).
- 2 July – Edward Vaughan Hyde Kenealy, barrister and writer (died 1880).
- 5 July – Hedges Eyre Chatterton, Conservative Party MP and Vice-Chancellor of Ireland (died 1910).
- 8 July – Francis Leopold McClintock, Royal Navy officer, explorer in the Canadian Arctic Archipelago (died 1907).
- 25 July – John J. Conroy, bishop of the Roman Catholic Diocese of Albany (New York) (died 1895).
- 13 August – George Stokes, mathematician known for the creation of the Navier-Stokes equation (died 1903).
- 10 September – Joseph M. Scriven, poet, hymnodist and philanthropist (died 1886).
- 25 September – George Salmon, mathematician and theologian (died 1904).
- 28 December – Arthur Hunter Palmer, politician in Australia (died 1898).
- Nicholas Joseph Crowley, portrait painter (died 1857).
- Edwin Hayes, English-born marine watercolourist (died 1904).
- Henry Wellesly McCann, farmer and politician in Canada.
- Joseph Neale McKenna, banker and politician (died 1906).

== Deaths ==
- 26 September – James Towers English, mercenary (born 1782).
- 27 November – Gustavus Conyngham, privateer (born c.1744/45).
- 10 December – Euseby Cleaver, Archbishop of Dublin (Church of Ireland) (born 1746).
- Thomas Meredith, clergyman and mathematician (born 1777).
- James O'Hara, military officer and businessman in the United States (born c.1752).

== See also ==
- 1819 in Scotland
- 1819 in Wales
