= 1875 in Ireland =

- Centuries: 17th; 18th; 19th; 20th; 21st
- Decades: 1850s; 1860s; 1870s; 1880s; 1890s
- See also: 1875 in the United Kingdom; Other events of 1875; List of years in Ireland

Events from the year 1875 in Ireland.

== Events ==
- May – Ballymena, Cushendall and Red Bay Railway (3 ft gauge) opens with services between Ballymena and Retreat, County Antrim.
- 22 June – Thomas Croke is appointed Archbishop of Cashel in succession to Patrick Leahy. Previously Bishop of the Roman Catholic Diocese of Auckland in New Zealand, he will hold the office until his death in 1902.

== Arts and literature ==
- 13 April – The Theatre Royal, Cork closes down for good.

== Sport ==
- 15 February – The Ireland national rugby union team plays its first international match, a 7–0 defeat by England.
- 6 August – Scottish football team Hibernian F.C. is founded by Irishmen in Edinburgh.

== Births ==
- 8 February – Valentine O'Hara, author and authority on Russia and the Baltic States (died 1945).
- 14 March – Patrick McLane, Democratic member of the U.S. House of Representatives from Pennsylvania (died 1946).
- 10 April – Joseph McGuinness, Sinn Féin MP and TD, member of the First Dáil (died 1922).
- 17 April – John Brunskill, cricketer (died 1940).
- 18 April – Katherine Thurston, née Katherine Cecil Madden, novelist (died 1911).
- 22 April – Michael Joseph O'Rahilly, The O'Rahilly, republican (killed during Easter Rising 1916).
- 28 May – Denis O'Donnell, entrepreneur (died 1933)
- 24 June – Forrest Reid, novelist and literary critic (died 1947)
- 5 July – Lawrence Bulger, international rugby union player (died 1928).
- 7 August – Kate Meyrick, née Nason, nightclub owner in London (died 1933 in England).
- 29 August – Robert Forde, Antarctic explorer (died 1959).
- 12 September – George Edward Pugin Meldon, cricketer (died 1950).
- 9 November – Hugh Lane, founder of Dublin's Municipal Gallery of Modern Art (died on RMS Lusitania 1915).

== Deaths ==
- 21 January – Sir Alexander McDonnell, 1st Baronet, lawyer, civil servant and commissioner of national education in Ireland (born 1794).
- 26 January – Patrick Leahy, Archbishop of Cashel (born 1806).
- 20 March – John Mitchel, nationalist activist, solicitor and journalist (born 1815).
- 29 April – William Nash, soldier, recipient of the Victoria Cross for gallantry in 1858 at Lucknow, India (born 1824).
- 13 May – John Willoughby Crawford, politician and third Lieutenant Governor of Ontario (born 1817).
- 15 May – James O'Reilly, lawyer and politician in Canada (born 1823).
- 25 May – Rose La Touche, muse of John Ruskin (born 1848).
- 3 June – Patrick Graham, recipient of the Victoria Cross for gallantry in 1857 at Lucknow, India (born 1837).
- 3 June – Miles Gerard Keon, journalist, novelist, colonial secretary and lecturer (born 1821).
- 13 July – William Coffey, soldier, recipient of the Victoria Cross for gallantry in 1855 at Sebastopol, the Crimea (born 1829).
- 22 September – Charles Bianconi, Italian-born carriage proprietor (born 1786).
- 24 October – Reverend William Hickey, writer and philanthropist (born 1787).
- 9 December – Sir Thomas Burke, 3rd Baronet, landowner and politician (born 1813).
- 27 December – Henry Hamilton O'Hara "Mad O'hara", "The Mad Squire of Craigbilly" (born 1820).

== See also ==
- 1875 in Scotland
- 1875 in Wales
