= 1807 in Ireland =

- Centuries: 17th; 18th; 19th; 20th; 21st
- Decades: 1780s; 1790s; 1800s; 1810s; 1820s
- See also: 1807 in the United Kingdom; Other events of 1807; List of years in Ireland

Events from the year 1807 in Ireland.

== Events ==
- March – Sir Arthur Wellesley is appointed Chief Secretary for Ireland.
- 18 May – exiled Irish rebel Michael Dwyer is acquitted of a charge of conspiring to mount an Irish insurrection against British rule in New South Wales (Australia), but subsequently stripped of his free settler status.
- 20 November – sinking of the Rochdale and the Prince of Wales: The British troopships Rochdale (brig) and Prince of Wales (packet ship) sink in a storm in Dublin Bay with the loss of around 400 lives.

== Arts and literature ==
- Actor Edmund Kean plays leading parts in the Belfast theatre with Sarah Siddons.

== Births ==
- 28 January – Robert McClure, Arctic explorer (died 1873).
- 7 March – John McCaul, educator, theologian, and the second president of the University of Toronto (died 1887).
- 10 March – James Fintan Lalor, revolutionary, journalist and writer (died 1849).
- 9 September – Richard Chenevix Trench, né Richard Trench, Archbishop of Dublin (Church of Ireland) (died 1886).
- 27 September – John T. Mullock, Roman Catholic Bishop of St. John's, Newfoundland (died 1869).
- 23 October – Baroness Tautphoeus, née Jemima Montgomery, novelist (died 1893).
- 14 December – Francis Hincks, politician in Canada (died 1885).
  Full date unknown
  - Robert Cane, doctor, member of the Repeal Association and the Irish Confederation, Mayor of Kilkenny (died 1858).
  - Thomas Henry, police magistrate in London (died 1876).

== Deaths ==
- 8 February – Dorcas Blackwood, 1st Baroness Dufferin and Claneboye (born 1726).
- 5 June – Boyle Roche, politician (born 1736).
- Nathaniel Grogan, painter (born 1740).
- Elizabeth Sugrue, hangwoman (born 1740s)

== See also ==
- 1807 in Scotland
- 1807 in Wales
