= 1806 in Ireland =

- Centuries: 17th; 18th; 19th; 20th; 21st
- Decades: 1780s; 1790s; 1800s; 1810s; 1820s
- See also: 1806 in the United Kingdom; Other events of 1806; List of years in Ireland

Events from the year 1806 in Ireland.

== Events ==
- 10 April – Sir Arthur Wellesley marries Kitty Pakenham, daughter of the Earl of Longford, in the temporary St. George's Church built on Whitworth Road in Dublin.
- American engraver Henry Pelham, agent for Lord Lansdowne's Irish estates, is drowned from a boat while superintending the erection of a martello tower in the Kenmare River.

== Arts and literature ==
- John Wilson Croker (anonymously) publishes his mock-heroic verse satire on Dublin socio-political life The Amazoniad; or, Figure and Fashion.
- Sydney Owenson publishes her epistolary novel The Wild Irish Girl: a National Tale.
- Samuel Thomson publishes his third volume of verse Simple Poems on a Few Subjects.
- The English architect George Papworth moves to Dublin.

== Births ==
- 21 January – William Quarter, first Roman Catholic bishop of Chicago (died 1848).
- 25 January – Daniel Maclise, painter (died 1870).
- 10 May - James Shields, Irish American politician and United States Army officer (died 1879 in the United States)
- 31 May – Patrick Leahy, Archbishop of Cashel (died 1875).
- 25 July – John O'Donovan, scholar and first historic topographer (died 1861).
- 1 August – Edward Crofton, 2nd Baron Crofton, Conservative politician (died 1869).
- 17 August – Peter Richard Kenrick, first Catholic archbishop west of the Mississippi River (died 1896).
- 20 August – Archibald Acheson, 3rd Earl of Gosford, Member of Parliament for Armagh (died 1864).
- 31 August – Charles Lever, novelist (died 1872).
- September – Samuel Davidson, biblical scholar (died 1898).
- 15 October – William Clements, 3rd Earl of Leitrim, nobleman and landowner (died 1878).
- 3 November – Robert Molesworth, judge in Australia (died 1890).
- 4 December – John T. Graves, mathematician (died 1870).
  Full date unknown
  - Simon Byrne, prize-fighter (died 1833).

== Deaths ==
- 22 February – James Barry, painter (born 1741).
- 31 May – George Macartney, 1st Earl Macartney, statesman, colonial administrator and diplomat (born 1737).
- 11 July – James Smith, lawyer and politician in the United States, signatory of the U.S. Declaration of Independence (born 1719).
- 9 September – William Paterson, judge in the United States, signatory of the U.S. Constitution (born 1745).
- 18 September – Patrick Cotter O'Brien, known as the Bristol Giant and the Irish Giant (born 1760).
- 30 September – William Fortescue, 1st Earl of Clermont, politician (born 1722).

== See also ==
- 1806 in Scotland
- 1806 in Wales
