= 1890 in Ireland =

- Centuries: 17th; 18th; 19th; 20th; 21st
- Decades: 1870s; 1880s; 1890s; 1900s; 1910s
- See also: 1890 in the United Kingdom; Other events of 1890; List of years in Ireland

Events from the year 1890 in Ireland.

== Events ==
- 30 April – James Connolly marries Lillie Reynolds in Perth, Scotland.
- 20 June – the newly covered St George's Market in Belfast is opened to the public.
- 16 July - Academics Alfred Cort Haddon and Andrew Francis Dixon (Dixon later became Professor of Anatomy at Trinity College Dublin), remove the partial skeletal remains of 13 people, including their skulls, from St Colman's monastery on the island of Inishbofin, County Galway (without the knowledge or permission of the community) for the purposes of studying craniometry.
- July – the new Guildhall (Victoria Hall) in Derry, financed by The Honourable The Irish Society, is opened.
- 17 November – Captain Willy O'Shea divorces his wife, Kitty, and wins custody of their children. Charles Stewart Parnell is named as the co-respondent.
- 25 November – despite his personal problems Parnell is re-elected as leader of the Irish Parliamentary Party.
- 26 November – Prime Minister William Ewart Gladstone announces that as long as Parnell remains as leader of the Party, the next general election will be lost and Home Rule for Ireland will be impossible.
- 6 December – after five days of discussion and argument about Parnell's leadership, 44 members of the Irish Parliamentary Party walk out of the meeting and withdraw from the Party, most going on to form the Irish National Federation. Parnell is left with only 28 supporters in the Irish National League.
- Seapoint tragedy: James O'Connor's wife and four of their daughters die after eating contaminated mussels.
- Albert Bridge, Belfast is completed.
- Dublin Museum of Science and Art opens.
- The parish church of Saint Peter and Saint Paul in Ennis becomes pro-cathedral for the Roman Catholic Diocese of Killaloe.
- The Royal Society of Antiquaries of Ireland is founded.
- A study finds that the most common Irish surnames are Murphy, Kelly, O'Sullivan and Walshe.

== Arts and literature ==
- July – Oscar Wilde's novel The Picture of Dorian Gray first published, in Lippincott's Monthly Magazine (London).
- 13 December – W. B. Yeats' poem The Lake Isle of Innisfree first published, in The National Observer (London).
- Douglas Hyde's Beside the Fire first published.

== Sport ==
=== Football ===
- International
  8 February Wales 5–2 Ireland (in Shrewsbury)
  15 March Ireland 1–9 England (in Belfast)
  29 March Ireland 1–4 Scotland (in Belfast)
  Irish Cup
  Winners: Gordon Highlanders 2–2, 3–1 Cliftonville
- The Irish Football League is formed.
- Solitude football ground in Belfast, the home of Cliftonville, is opened, making it the oldest football ground in Ireland.
- 6 September – Bohemian Football Club is founded in Dublin in the Gate Lodge of Phoenix Park.

== Births ==
- 28 January – Eoin O'Duffy, leader in the Irish Republican Army, Garda Commissioner, first leader of Fine Gael and the Blueshirts, leader of the volunteer Francoist Irish Brigade (Spanish Civil War) and sports administrator (died 1944).
- 12 February – Conn Ward, Fianna Fáil politician (died 1966).
- 23 March – James Gogarty, rebel in Easter Rising, first known I.R.B. casualty of the Irish War of Independence (died 1921).
- 11 April – Debroy Somers, bandleader (died 1952 in London).
- 17 May – David P. Tyndall, businessman (died 1970).
- 1 June – Edward Hutchinson Synge, theoretical physicist (died 1957)
- 11 July – William O'Dwyer, judge, District Attorney and 100th Mayor of New York City (died 1964).
- 6 September – Brinsley MacNamara, born John Weldon, novelist and playwright (died 1963).
- 12 October – Bill Britton, athlete and British Empire Games medallist (died 1965).
- 16 October – Michael Collins, Revolutionary and Commander-in-Chief of the Irish Free State Army, Cabinet Minister (assassinated 1922).
- 30 October – Arthur Bateman, cricketer (died 1918).
- 1 December – The Hon. Mary Westenra, later Mary Bailey, aviator (died 1960).
- 25 December – Robert Burgess, rugby union player (killed in action 1915 in France).
- 31 December – Frederick Crowley, Fianna Fáil politician (died 1945).

== Deaths ==
- 12 January – Anthony Lefroy, Irish Conservative Party MP for County Longford in the United Kingdom Parliament (born 1800).
- 14 March – C. P. Meehan, priest, poet and writer (born 1812).
- 4 April – Charles Joseph Alleyn, lawyer and political figure in Quebec (born 1817).
- 12 April – James P. Boyd, businessman and politician in Ontario (born 1826).
- 27 May – James O'Connor, first Archbishop of the Roman Catholic Archdiocese of Omaha (born 1823).
- 29 May – Samuel Mullen, bookseller (born 1828).
- 20 July – Sir Richard Wallace, 1st Baronet, art collector and MP (born 1818).
- 10 August – John Boyle O'Reilly, poet and novelist (born 1844).
- 18 September – Dion Boucicault, actor and playwright (born c.1820).
- Full date unknown – John Coghlan, public works engineer in Argentina (born 1824).

== See also ==
- 1890 in Scotland
- 1890 in Wales
