= 1873 in Ireland =

- Centuries: 17th; 18th; 19th; 20th; 21st
- Decades: 1850s; 1860s; 1870s; 1880s; 1890s
- See also: 1873 in the United Kingdom; Other events of 1873; List of years in Ireland

Events from the year 1873 in Ireland.

== Events ==
- February – Irish Home Rule Movement: Home Rule Confederation of Great Britain founded in Manchester.
- March – Gladstone's Irish University Bill defeated in the House of Commons.
- May 4 – the Roman Catholic St Eugene's Cathedral, Derry, is dedicated.
- November 18–21 – Irish Home Rule Movement: The Home Government Association reconstitutes itself as the Home Rule League.

== Sport ==
- October – foundation of County Carlow Football Club, Rugby Union Club

== Births ==
- 9 January – John Flanagan, three-time Olympic gold medalist in the hammer throw (died 1938).
- 17 January – T. C. Murray, dramatist (died 1959).
- 27 January – Alexander Young, soldier, recipient of the Victoria Cross for gallantry in 1901 at Ruiterskraal, South Africa, killed in action (died 1916).
- 1 February – John Barry, soldier, posthumous recipient of the Victoria Cross for gallantry in 1901 at Monument Hill, South Africa (died 1901).
- 20 March – Cecil Lowry-Corry, 6th Earl Belmore, High Sheriff and councillor (died 1949).
- 29 March (bapt.) – Peig Sayers (Máiréad Sayers), seanchaí (traditional storyteller) (died 1958).
- 30 March – William Lyle, 1940s Member of the House of Commons of Northern Ireland for Queen's University of Belfast (died 1949)
- 19 April – Thomas Crean, recipient of the Victoria Cross for gallantry in 1901 at Tygerkloof Spruit, South Africa (died 1923).
- 5 May – Lucius Gwynn, cricketer (died 1902).
- 18 May – J. B. Fagan, actor-manager (died 1933 in Hollywood)
- 28 May – D. D. Sheehan, journalist, barrister, author, Irish Parliamentary Party MP, one of four MP's to serve in 16th (Irish) Division in World War I (died 1948).
- 3 June – Sir John Keane, 5th Baronet, barrister, member of Seanad (died 1956).
- 14 June – William Parsons, 5th Earl of Rosse, soldier (died 1918).
- 22 July James Cousins, poet and writer (died 1956).
- 6 August – James O'Mara, Irish Parliamentary Party and Sinn Féin MP (died 1948).
- 2 September – James Duhig, Archbishop of Roman Catholic Archdiocese of Brisbane (died 1965).
- 26 September – Annie M. P. Smithson, nurse, novelist, poet and Nationalist (died 1948).
- 30 October – Dave Gallaher, rugby player for New Zealand, killed at the Battle of Passchendaele (died 1917).
- 26 November – Tom Sharkey, boxer (died 1953).
- 5 December – William Crozier, cricketer (died 1916).
- 9 December – James McCombs, politician in New Zealand (died 1933).
- 12 December – Lola Ridge, anarchist poet and editor (died 1941).

== Deaths ==
- Early – Master McGrath, greyhound (born 1866).
- 7 February – Sheridan Le Fanu, novelist (born 1814).
- 20 February – James Haughton, social reformer and temperance activist (born 1795).
- 28 March – John Watts, military officer, architect in Australia (born 1786).
- 30 March – Richard Church, soldier, military officer and general in the Greek Army (born 1784).
- 8 April – Charles Irwin, soldier, recipient of the Victoria Cross for gallantry in 1857 at Lucknow, India (born 1824).

== See also ==
- 1873 in Scotland
- 1873 in Wales
