= 1870 in Ireland =

- Centuries: 17th; 18th; 19th; 20th; 21st
- Decades: 1850s; 1860s; 1870s; 1880s; 1890s
- See also: 1870 in the United Kingdom; Other events of 1870; List of years in Ireland

Events from the year 1870 in Ireland.

== Events ==
- 19 May – the Home Government Association is established by Isaac Butt to argue for devolution for Ireland and repeal of the Act of Union.
- 27 August – White Star's first ocean liner RMS Oceanic is launched by Harland and Wolff in Belfast.
- 19 October – SS Cambria (1869) is wrecked on Inishtrahull with the loss of 179 lives.
- Landlord and Tenant (Ireland) Act 1870 passed in an attempt to secure greater security of tenure for landholders.
- The building of Belfast Castle is completed, to a design by Charles Lanyon and his son.
- Work is completed on the building of the Albert Memorial Clock, Belfast, as a memorial to Queen Victoria's late Prince Consort, Prince Albert.
- First service is held in the new Saint Fin Barre's Cathedral, Cork (Church of Ireland).
- Belfast Hebrew Congregation is established.

== Arts and literature ==
- The Water Colour Society of Ireland is founded as the Amateur Drawing Society by an informal group of six well-connected women from County Waterford.

== Births ==
- 22 January – John B. Sheridan, Irish American sports journalist (died 1930 in the United States)
- 3 February – Beatrice Grimshaw, anthropologist (died 1953 in Australia).
- 8 February – Robert Pilkington, lawyer and politician in the Western Australian Legislative Assembly and House of Commons of the UK (died 1942 in England).
- 2 April – Edmund Dwyer-Gray, politician and 29th Premier of Tasmania in 1939 (died 1945 in Australia).
- 17 April – Robert Tressell, born Robert Croker, radical, author of The Ragged-Trousered Philanthropists (died 1911 in England).
- 5 May – Armar Lowry-Corry, 5th Earl Belmore, High Sheriff and Deputy Lieutenant of County Fermanagh (died 1948).
- 22 May – Eva Gore-Booth, poet, dramatist, suffragist, social worker and labour activist (died 1926 in London).
- 25 June – Erskine Childers, writer and nationalist (executed by Free State firing squad 1922 at Beggars Bush Barracks, Dublin).
- 8 July – R. A. Stewart Macalister, archaeologist (died 1950).
- 16 July – Lambert McKenna, Jesuit priest and writer (died 1956).
- 16 September – John Boland, Nationalist politician, MP and Olympic tennis gold medallist (died 1958 in England).
- 10 October – Frank Lawless, Sinn Féin TD, member of the First Dáil and the Second Dáil (died 1922).
- 19 November – William MacCarthy-Morrogh, cricketer (died 1939).
- November – Thomas Moles, Ulster Unionist MP (died 1937).
- 5 December – John O'Connor, priest (died 1952 in England).
- Undated – P. T. Daly, trade unionist (died 1943).

== Deaths ==
- 17 March – John Keegan Casey, "poet of the Fenians" (born 1846).
- 25 April – Daniel Maclise, painter (born 1806).
- c. May – John Skipton Mulvany, architect (born 1813).
- 31 May – Chartres Brew, Gold commissioner, Chief Constable and judge in the Colony of British Columbia (born 1815).
- 7 September – Hugh Talbot Burgoyne, recipient of the Victoria Cross for gallantry in 1855 in the Sea of Azov, Crimea (born 1833).
- 23 September – Thomas McCarthy, businessman and politician in Quebec (born 1832).
- 20 October – Michael William Balfe, composer (born 1808).
- 9 December – Patrick MacDowell, sculptor (born 1799).
- 12 December – Martin Cregan, portrait painter (born 1788).

== See also ==
- 1870 in Scotland
- 1870 in Wales
