= 1867 in Ireland =

- Centuries: 17th; 18th; 19th; 20th; 21st
- Decades: 1840s; 1850s; 1860s; 1870s; 1880s
- See also: 1867 in the United Kingdom; Other events of 1867; List of years in Ireland

Events from the year 1867 in Ireland.

== Events ==
- 11 February – abortive Fenian attempt to seize Chester Castle.
- 5 March – Fenian Rising in County Dublin, County Cork, County Limerick, County Tipperary and County Clare.
- 12 July – despite the Party Processions Acts, the Orange Order parades from Bangor to Newtownards in County Down. It is organised by William Johnston (sentenced to a short term in prison the next year for his actions) and about 30,000 take part.
- August – Irish Republican Brotherhood convention at Manchester appoints Colonel Thomas J. Kelly to succeed James Stephens.
- 11 September – Thomas J. Kelly and Timothy Deasy are arrested in Manchester.
- 18 September – rescue of Kelly and Deasy from a police van in Manchester; one policeman is shot.
- 12 October – 62 Fenians are among the last group of convicts to suffer penal transportation as the convict ship Hougoumont departs from Portsmouth on an 89-day passage to Western Australia.
- 23 November – William Allen, Michael Larkin and Michael O'Brien, the 'Manchester Martyrs', are hanged in Salford for their part in the rescue of Kelly and Deasy.
- 13 December – Clerkenwell explosion at Clerkenwell Prison in London during a Fenian escape attempt; 12 local residents are killed.
- Royal Irish Constabulary granted its "Royal" prefix by Queen Victoria.

== Births ==
- 1 January – Thomas Westropp Bennett, Cumann na nGaedheal member of the Seanad, Cathaoirleach of Seanad (died 1962).
- 25 January – Dolway Walkington, Irish national rugby union captain (died 1926).
- 9 February – James Douglas, journalist (died 1940).
- 10 April – George William Russell, critic, poet and artist (died 1935).
- 19 April – James Cullen, priest and mathematician (died 1933).
- 13 May – Thomas Gann, doctor, archaeologist and writer (died 1938).

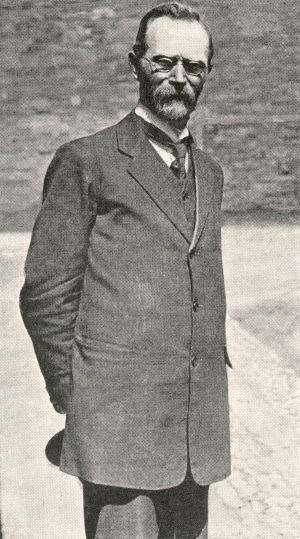
Eoin MacNeill

- 15 May – Eoin MacNeill, scholar, nationalist and revolutionary (died 1945).
- 17 June – John Robert Gregg, creator of Gregg Shorthand (died 1948).
- 11 August – Martin Morris, 2nd Baron Killanin, barrister and politician (died 1927).
- 2 October – James Stevenson-Hamilton, soldier and game warden (died 1957 in South Africa)
- 10 November – John Henry Patterson, soldier, hunter and writer (died 1947).
- 16 December – Amy Carmichael, Christian missionary and writer (died 1951).
- 26 December – Ella Young, poet (died 1956).
- 31 December – Seumas MacManus, writer (died 1960).
- Undated – Cathal O'Byrne, singer, poet and writer (died 1957).

== Deaths ==
- 7 February – William Dargan, engineer and railway builder (born 1799).
- 22 February – Daniel Devlin, businessman and City Chamberlain in New York (born 1814).
- 12 April – Robert Bell, journalist and writer (born 1800).
- 20 April – John Lyons, soldier, recipient of the Victoria Cross for gallantry in 1855 at the siege of Sebastopol in the Crimean War (born 1824).
- 17 September – Francis Blackburne, Lord Chancellor of Ireland (born 1782).
- 23 September – Richard W. Dowling, victorious commander at the Second Battle of Sabine Pass in the American Civil War (born 1838).
- 31 October – William Parsons, 3rd Earl of Rosse, astronomer, builder of the "Leviathan of Parsonstown" (born 1800).
- 10 December – Edward Whelan, politician, a Father of the Canadian Confederation (born 1824).
- Undated – George Crawford Hyndman, auctioneer and amateur biologist (born 1796).

== See also ==
- 1867 in Scotland
- 1867 in Wales
