= 1871 in Ireland =

- Centuries: 17th; 18th; 19th; 20th; 21st
- Decades: 1850s; 1860s; 1870s; 1880s; 1890s
- See also: 1871 in the United Kingdom; Other events of 1871; List of years in Ireland

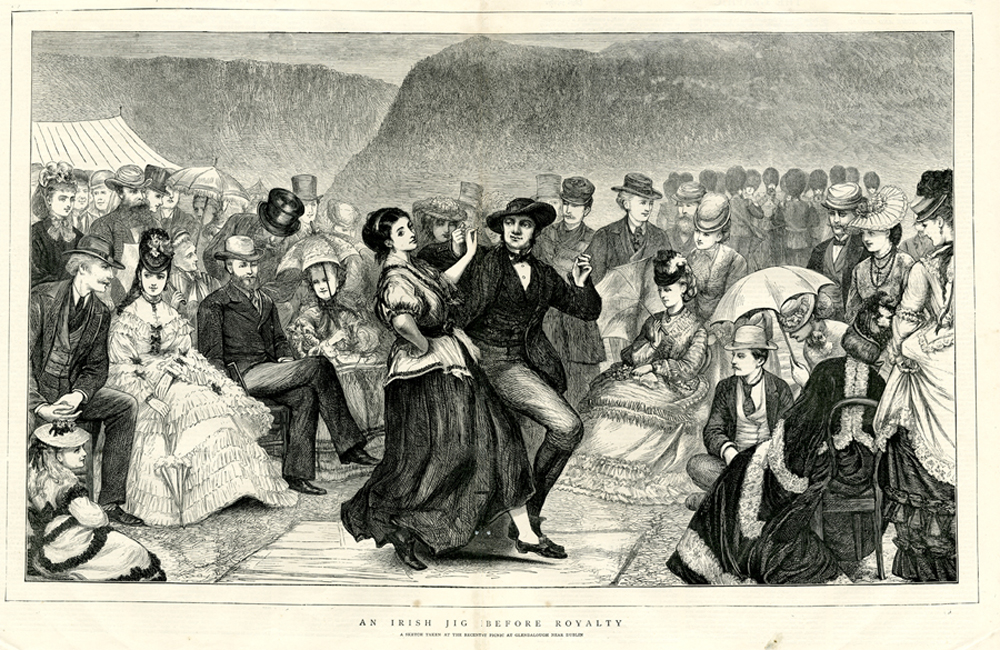
An Irish Jig before Royalty, a Sketch taken at the Recent Picnic at Glendalough near Dublin. Illustration for The Graphic, 1871.

Events from the year 1871 in Ireland.

== Events ==
- 1 January – Church of Ireland disestablished. St Patrick's Cathedral, Dublin, becomes the National Cathedral.
- 15 April – Ormeau Park is opened to the public by Belfast City Council.
- 16 June – The Westmeath Act is enacted allowing arrest and detention without trial.
- J. P. Mahaffy appointed to the Chair of Ancient History at Trinity College Dublin at the age of 32.

== Sport ==
=== Hare coursing ===
- Waterloo Cup won by Master McGrath for the third time.

== Births ==
- 8 January – James Craig, 1st Viscount Craigavon, first Prime Minister of Northern Ireland (died 1940).
- 14 January – A. M. Sullivan, lawyer (died 1959).
- 16 January – Valentine McEntee, 1st Baron McEntee, Labour MP in the United Kingdom (died 1953).
- 19 January – Frederick Barton Maurice, soldier, military correspondent, writer and academic, founded the British Legion in 1920 (died 1951).
- 13 February – Joseph Devlin, Nationalist politician and MP in the British House of Commons and in Northern Ireland (died 1934).
- 30 March – William Lyle, medical practitioner and Ulster Unionist Party politician (died 1949).
- 16 April – John Millington Synge, dramatist, poet and writer (died 1909).
- 18 April – Frederick Field, Royal Navy Admiral of the Fleet and First Sea Lord (died 1945).
- ? May – Elinor Darwin, née Monsell, engraver and portrait painter (died 1954 in England).
- 17 July – J. M. Andrews, second Prime Minister of Northern Ireland (died 1956).
- 30 August – James Nathaniel Halbert, entomologist (died 1948).
- 30 November – Thomas O'Donnell, barrister, judge, Irish Nationalist, MP (died 1943).
- November – Thomas Moles, Ulster Unionist politician and journalist (died 1937).
- 26 December – Chicago May, born Mary Anne Duignan, criminal (died 1929 in the United States).

== Deaths ==
- 2 January – Samuel Blackall, soldier, politician and second Governor of Queensland, Australia (born 1809).
- 3 February – James Sheridan Muspratt, research chemist and teacher (born 1821).
- 20 February – Paul Kane, painter in Canada (born 1810).
- 1 March – Anthony Coningham Sterling, British Army officer and historian (born 1805).
- 4 July – James Duffy, author and publisher (born 1809).
- 2 October – Sir Thomas Deane, architect (born 1792).
- 6 October – Edwin Wyndham-Quin, 3rd Earl of Dunraven and Mount-Earl, peer (born 1812).
- 30 November – John T. Mills, lawyer and Supreme Court Justice for the Republic of Texas (born 1817).
- 8 December – James Murray, physician (born 1788)
- 15 December – John George, politician, judge and in 1859 Solicitor-General for Ireland (born 1804).

== See also ==
- 1871 in Scotland
- 1871 in Wales
