= 1881 in Ireland =

- Centuries: 17th; 18th; 19th; 20th; 21st
- Decades: 1860s; 1870s; 1880s; 1890s; 1900s
- See also: 1881 in the United Kingdom; Other events of 1881; List of years in Ireland

Events from the year 1881 in Ireland.

== Events ==
- 16 January – the lowest temperature ever recorded in Ireland, −19.1C (−2.4F) at Markree, County Sligo.
- 3 February – arrest of Michael Davitt.
- 2 March – Protection of Persons and Property (Ireland) Act 1881, a Coercion Act, is passed.
- June – the submarine "Fenian Ram" (Holland Boat No. II), designed by Irish-born John Philip Holland and financed by the American Fenian Brotherhood, is first submersion-tested in New York City.
- 22 August – William Ewart Gladstone's Land Law (Ireland) Act 1881, the second of the Irish Land Acts, secures the three "f"s (fair rents, fixity of tenure and freedom of sale), and gives the courts the authority to reconsider judicial rents every three years and to adjust them in line with shifts in agricultural prices.
- 13 October – arrest of Charles Stewart Parnell and other leaders.
- 18 October – No Rent Manifesto.
- 19 October – Irish National Land League proclaimed as an unlawful association.

Date unknown

- Sirocco Works, an engineering firm was founded in Belfast by Samuel Cleland Davidson.
- Kilmacud Monastery established by Carmelite nuns.
- Approximate date – St John Ambulance Ireland establishes its first centre, in Dublin.

== Arts and literature ==
- June – Oscar Wilde's Poems published in London.

== Sport ==
=== Football ===
- Irish Cup
  Winners: Moyola Park 1–0 Cliftonville (first ever Irish Cup winners)

=== Golf ===
- 9 November – Royal Belfast Golf Club founded, the oldest in Ireland.

== Births ==
- 23 January – William O'Brien, politician and trade unionist (died 1968).
- 10 February – Ken McArthur, winner of the marathon race at the 1912 Summer Olympics for South Africa (died 1960).
- 15 February – Piaras Béaslaí, member of the Irish Republican Brotherhood, member of Dáil Éireann, author, playwright, biographer and translator (died 1965).
- 14 March – Robert Barton, Sinn Féin MP, Cabinet Minister and signatory of Anglo-Irish Treaty 1921 (died 1975).
- 21 March – Seán O'Hegarty, Irish Republican Army member during the Irish War of Independence (died 1963).
- 25 March – Moya Llewelyn Davies, born Mary Elizabeth O'Connor, Republican activist and Gaelic scholar (died 1943).
- 28 March – Martin Sheridan, Olympic gold medallist for the United States (died 1918).
- 10 April – William John Leech, painter (died 1968).
- 24 April – John Joe O'Reilly, Cumann na nGaedheal and Fine Gael TD (died 1967).
- 5 May – Horace de Vere Cole, prankster (died 1936 in France)
- 20 May – Robert Gregory, cricketer, artist and airman (shot down 1918 in Italy).
- 26 July – James Cecil Parke, international rugby player, tennis player, golfer and Olympic medallist (died 1946).
- 21 September – Éamonn Ceannt, nationalist, rebel and Easter Rising leader (executed 1916).
- 13 November
  - Con Collins, Sinn Féin MP (died 1937).
  - John Tudor Gwynn, cricketer (died 1956).
- 8 December – Padraic Colum, poet, novelist and dramatist (died 1972).
- 25 December – John Dill, British Army field marshal (died 1944 in the United States).
- Full date unknown
  - William Conor, artist (died 1968).
  - Seumas O'Kelly, journalist and author (died 1918)

== Deaths ==
- 30 January – Anna Maria Hall, novelist (born 1800).
- January – Alfred Elmore, painter (born 1815).
- 5 February – Richard Graves MacDonnell, lawyer, judge and colonial governor (born 1814).
- 1 August – Nathaniel Thomas Hone, cricketer (born 1861).
- 9 September – Robert Carew, 2nd Baron Carew, politician (born 1818).
- 10 October – Richard Turner, iron-founder (born 1798).
- 5 November – Robert Mallet, geologist, civil engineer and inventor (born 1810).
- 7 November – John MacHale, Roman Catholic Archbishop of Tuam, Irish Nationalist and writer (born 1791).

== See also ==
- 1881 in Scotland
- 1881 in Wales
