= 1883 in Ireland =

- Centuries: 17th; 18th; 19th; 20th; 21st
- Decades: 1860s; 1870s; 1880s; 1890s; 1900s
- See also: 1883 in the United Kingdom; Other events of 1883; List of years in Ireland

Events from the year 1883 in Ireland.

== Events ==
- April – the narrow gauge Castlederg and Victoria Bridge Tramway opens in County Tyrone.
- May – The four winged statues at the base of the O'Connell Monument are finally installed at the monument. The monument had been officially unveiled to the public without them a year earlier.
- 23 October – the Society of Jesus takes over University College Dublin.
- 30 October – two Clan na Gael dynamite bombs explode in the London Underground, injuring several people. Next day the British Home Secretary, William Vernon Harcourt, introduces the Explosives Bill.
- 1 November – Mater Infirmorum Hospital in Belfast admits its first patients.

== Arts and literature ==
- George Moore's first novel, the realist A Modern Lover, is published.

== Sport ==
=== Rugby union ===
- Ireland take part in the inaugural Home Nations Championship
- Ireland's first home championship game played at Ormeau Road in Belfast.

=== Soccer ===
- International
  24 February England 7–0 Ireland (in Liverpool)
  17 March Ireland 1–1 Wales (in Belfast)
- Irish Cup
  Winners: Cliftonville 5–0 Ulster

== Births ==
- 7 January – Andrew Cunningham, 1st Viscount Cunningham of Hyndhope, British admiral of the Second World War and First Sea Lord (died 1963 in London).
- 14 January – Bulmer Hobson, nationalist, an early leader of the Irish Republican Brotherhood (died 1969).
- 15 January – Helena Molony, fights in the 1916 Easter Rising and first woman president of the Irish Trades Union Congress (died 1967).
- 24 January – Denis McCullough, Irish Volunteers, elected to the 4th Dáil Éireann (died 1968).
- 29 January – Billy McCracken, footballer and football manager (died 1979).
- 28 February – Seán Mac Diarmada, nationalist, rebel and Easter Rising leader (executed 1916).
- 1 May – Thomas J. Moore, actor (died 1955).
- 8 May – Máire Nic Shiubhlaigh, born Mary Walker, actress and Republican activist (died 1958).
- 13 May – Jimmy Archer, Major League baseball player (died 1958 in the United States).
- 23 June – Eva McGown, Official Hostess of Fairbanks and Honorary Hostess of Alaska (died 1972 in the United States).
- 15 July – Denny Barry, Irish Republican (died on hunger strike 1923).
- 2 August – Sam Irving, footballer and football manager (died 1968).
- 2 September – Alexander Haslett, independent TD (died 1951).
- 12 December – Peadar Kearney, Irish Republican and songwriter, co-author of "The Soldier's Song" (died 1942).
- 28 November – Rory O'Connor, Irish republican activist captured at the fall of the Four Courts (executed 1922).
- 28 December – St. John Greer Ervine, author and dramatist (died 1971 in London).
  Full date unknown
  - Lorcán Ó Muireadais, priest and Irish language promoter (died 1941).
  - Louisa Watson Peat, writer and lecturer (died 1953 in the United States)

== Deaths ==
- 9 February – Henry John Stephen Smith, mathematician (died 1826).
- 26 May – Edward Sabine, astronomer, scientist, ornithologist and explorer (born 1788).
- 25 July – Frederick Edward Maning, writer and judge in New Zealand (born 1812).
- 22 October – Thomas Mayne Reid, novelist (born 1818).
- 24 November – William Fitzgerald, Church of Ireland Bishop of Killaloe (born 1814).
- 17 December – James Carey, Fenian and informer, executed in London (born 1845).
  Full date unknown
  - Robert Dwyer Joyce, music collector and writer (born 1830).

== See also ==
- 1883 in Scotland
- 1883 in Wales
