= 1885 in Ireland =

- Centuries: 17th; 18th; 19th; 20th; 21st
- Decades: 1860s; 1870s; 1880s; 1890s; 1900s
- See also: 1885 in the United Kingdom; Other events of 1885; List of years in Ireland

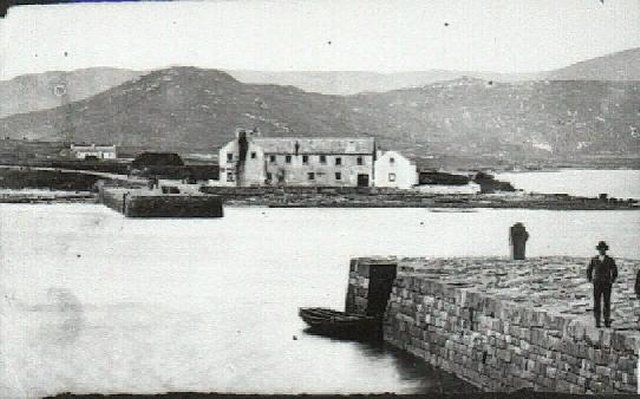
Achill Sound before the construction of the first bridge

Events from the year 1885 in Ireland.

== Events ==
- 21 January – Charles Stewart Parnell delivered his "famous" 'March of the Nation' speech in Cork, parts of which were later used as text on the monument erected in his memory in Dublin.
- 24 January – Irish terrorists damage Westminster Hall and the Tower of London with dynamite.
- 2 August – William Walsh is consecrated as Roman Catholic Archbishop of Dublin and Primate of Ireland, an office he will hold until his death in 1921.
- 23 November – the 1885 general election in Ireland is the first election following the Representation of the People Act 1884 and the Redistribution of Seats Act 1885. The Home Rule Party, led by Charles Stewart Parnell, wins 85 seats. In the U.K. Parliament, Liberals under Gladstone hold the largest number of seats, but Salisbury remains Prime Minister with the support of the Irish Party.
- The Munster & Leinster Bank, a constituent of Allied Irish Banks, begins operations following the collapse of the Munster Bank.
- The Railway Tavern in Belfast is renovated and reopened as the Crown Liquor Saloon.
- The distinctive twin spires are added to St Peter's Cathedral, Belfast, which had been dedicated in 1860.
- Jacob's open a biscuit bakery in Waterford.
- 2-year-old Éamon de Valera is brought from the United States to live with his maternal family in County Limerick following the death of his father.

== Arts and literature ==
- Katharine Tynan publishes Louise de la Valliere, and Other Poems.

== Sport ==
=== Football ===
- International
  28 February England 4–0 Ireland (in Manchester)
  14 March Scotland 8–2 Ireland (in Glasgow)
  11 April Ireland 2–8 Wales (in Belfast)
  Irish Cup
  Winners: Distillery 2–0 Limavady Alexander

== Births ==
- 12 January – Thomas Ashe, took part in the Easter Rising, died following forcible feeding while on hunger strike (died 1917).
- 12 January – Maire O'Neill, actress (died 1952).
- 18 January – George Meldon, cricketer (died 1951).
- 19 January – Joseph Connolly, Fianna Fáil politician (died 1961).
- 8 February – Frederick William Hall, soldier, posthumous recipient of the Victoria Cross for gallantry in 1915 during the Second Battle of Ypres in Belgium (died 1915).
- 27 February – Bethel Solomons, obstetrician and rugby player (died 1965).
- 28 February – Robert Quigg, soldier, recipient of the Victoria Cross for gallantry in 1916 at the Battle of the Somme (died 1955).
- 1 May – Michael Staines, Sinn Féin TD, member of First Dáil, first Commissioner of the Garda Síochána (died 1955).
- 25 May – Gerald Boland, founder-member of Fianna Fáil, served as Minister for Posts & Telegraphs, Minister for Lands and Minister for Justice (died 1973).
- 30 May – Thomas Hughes, soldier, recipient of the Victoria Cross for gallantry in 1916 at Guillemont, France (died 1942).
- 9 June – William Coffey, cricketer.
- 24 September – Shane Leslie, diplomat and writer (died 1971).
- 10 October – Patrick Hogan, Labour Party, TD, Ceann Comhairle of Dáil Éireann (died 1969).
- 25 December – Jimmy Gardner, boxer (died 1964).
  Full date unknown
  - Charles Campbell, 2nd Baron Glenavy, peer (died 1963).
  - C. Morton Horne, musical comedy performer (killed in action 1916).

== Deaths ==
- 1 February – Thomas O'Hagan, 1st Baron O'Hagan, Lord Chancellor of Ireland (born 1812).
- 13 February – Barry Yelverton, 5th Viscount Avonmore, nobleman and officer (born 1859).
- 30 July – John O'Kane Murray, physician and author (born 1847).
- 18 August – Francis Hincks, politician in Canada (born 1807).
- 31 October – James Hamilton, 1st Duke of Abercorn, politician and twice Lord Lieutenant of Ireland (born 1811).
- 26 November – Thomas Andrews, chemist and physicist (born 1813).

== See also ==
- 1885 in Scotland
- 1885 in Wales
