= 1805 in Ireland =

- Centuries: 17th; 18th; 19th; 20th; 21st
- Decades: 1780s; 1790s; 1800s; 1810s; 1820s
- See also: 1805 in the United Kingdom; Other events of 1805; List of years in Ireland

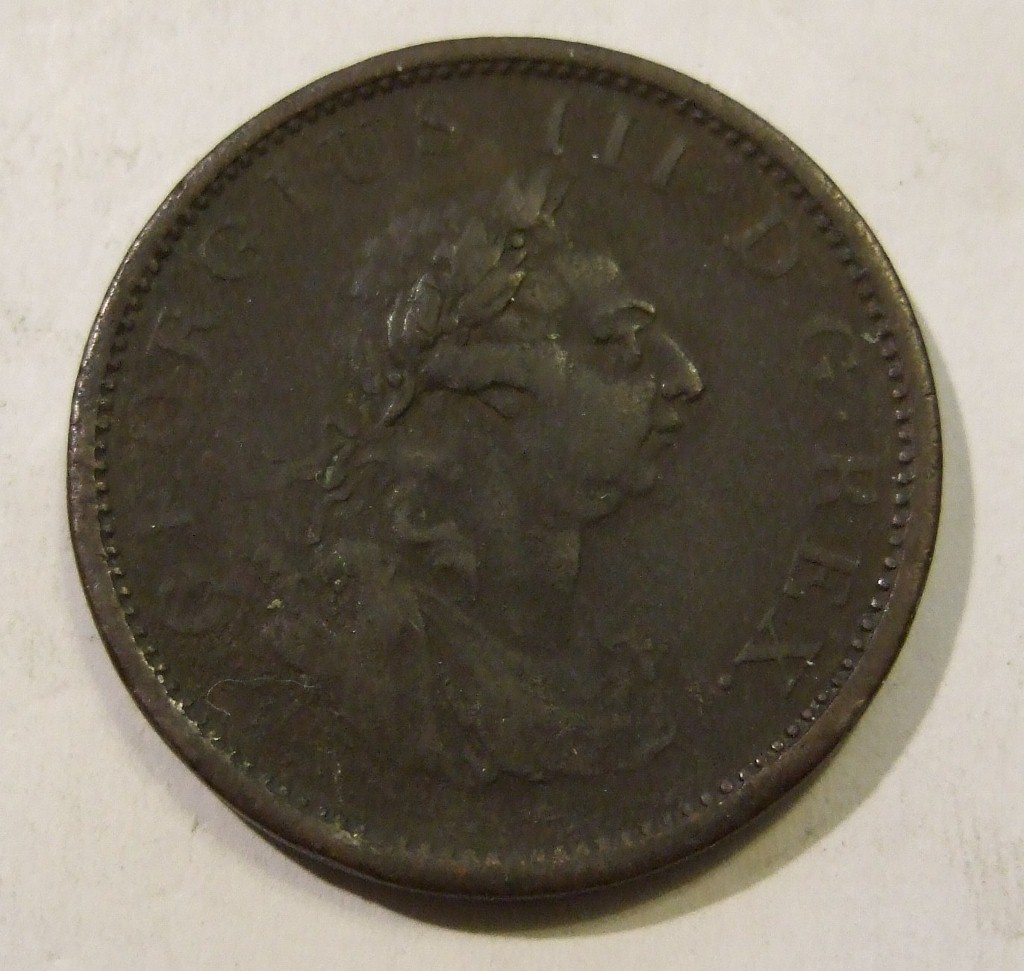
1805 Irish penny, bearing George III's portrait.

This is a list of events from the year 1805 in Ireland

== Events ==
- August – rebel leader Michael Dwyer, held without sentence in Kilmainham Gaol, is transported to Sydney (Australia), where he lands as a free settler in February 1806.
- 21 October – Battle of Trafalgar: a British Royal Navy fleet led by Admiral Horatio Nelson defeats a combined French and Spanish fleet off the coast of Spain. Almost 4,000 of the 18,000 men on the British ships were born in Ireland.

== Publications ==
- Mary Tighe's poem Psyche, or the Legend of Love

== Births ==
- 2 January – John Hogan, businessman and United States Representative from Missouri (died 1892).
- 5 April – Samuel Forde, painter from Cork (died 1828).
- 4 August – William Rowan Hamilton, mathematician, physicist, and astronomer (died 1865).
- 2 December - William Thompson, naturalist (died 1852).
  Full date unknown
  - Jon Riley, deserter from United States Army, a founder of the San Patricios (died 1850).
  - Anthony Coningham Sterling, British Army officer and historian (died 1871).

== Deaths ==
- 27 April – William Trench, 1st Earl of Clancarty, politician and statesman (born 1741).
- 7 May – William Petty, 2nd Earl of Shelburne, British Whig statesman, Home Secretary in 1782 and Prime Minister 1782–1783 (born 1737).
- 18 June – Arthur Murphy, editor and writer (born 1727).
- 27 July – Brian Merriman, Irish language poet and teacher (b. c. 1749).
- August – John Talbot Dillon, traveller and historical writer (b. c. 1740).
- 8 December – Rose ffrench, 1st Baroness ffrench.

== See also ==
- 1805 in Scotland
- 1805 in Wales
