= 1880 in Ireland =

- Centuries: 17th; 18th; 19th; 20th; 21st
- Decades: 1860s; 1870s; 1880s; 1890s; 1900s
- See also: 1880 in the United Kingdom; Other events of 1880; List of years in Ireland

Events from the year 1880 in Ireland.

== Events ==
- 2 February – Charles Stewart Parnell addresses the United States Congress.
- 31 March–27 April – United Kingdom general election in Ireland produces a majority for the nationalist Irish Parliamentary Party in Irish seats.
- 27 April – charter founding the Royal University of Ireland, allowing the Catholic University of Ireland to re-form as University College Dublin.
- 17 May – Parnell elected chairman of the Irish Parliamentary Party.
- May – Irish National Land League of the United States founded.
- September–November – "Boycotting" of Captain Charles Boycott.
- 18 October – Ballycastle Railway opened between Ballymoney and Ballycastle.
- December – trial of Parnell and others for conspiracy begins.
- English philanthropists are active in connection with the west of Ireland: Quaker James Hack Tute distributes aid and publishes Irish Distress and its Remedies; heiress Angela Burdett-Coutts, 1st Baroness Burdett-Coutts, offers to advance £250,000 to the authorities for the supply of seed potatoes, forcing the government to take action itself.
- St Stephen's Green, Dublin, opened as a public park.

== Arts and literature ==
- 9 February – the Theatre Royal, Dublin, burns to the ground.

== Sport ==
=== Soccer ===
- 18 November – Irish Football Association is founded at the Queen's Hotel, Belfast.
- Irish Cup knock-out competition instituted on an all-Ireland basis.

== Births ==
- 3 January – Francis Browne, Jesuit priest and photographer (died 1960).
- 6 January – John McKenna, traditional flute player (died 1947 in the United States)
- 12 January – Frank Fahy, Sinn Féin MP and later TD, member of First Dáil, Ceann Comhairle, Fianna Fáil TD (died 1953).
- 23 January – Herbert Dixon, 1st Baron Glentoran, Unionist politician (died 1950).
- 9 February – Tom Kettle, writer, barrister, Nationalist politician and economist (killed in action 1916).
- 20 February – J. J. Walsh, Sinn Féin MP, member of First Dáil, a founder-member of Cumann na nGaedheal and Cabinet Minister (died 1948).
- 29 March – Walter Guinness, 1st Baron Moyne, British politician and businessman (assassinated in Cairo by the Zionist group Lehi (Stern Gang) 1944), born at Iveagh House, Dublin.
- 30 March – Seán O'Casey, dramatist and memoirist (died 1964).
- 26 April – Joseph Lynch, cricketer (died 1915).
- 6 June – W. T. Cosgrave, first President of the Executive Council of the Irish Free State (died 1965).
- 13 June – John Dignan, Roman Catholic Bishop of Clonfert (died 1953).
- 2 July – Mary Elizabeth Byrne, literary scholar (died 1931).
- 19 August – Augusta Crichton-Stuart, Marchioness of Bute (died 1947).
- 24 August – William Kenny, soldier, recipient of the Victoria Cross for gallantry in 1914 near Ypres, Belgium (died 1936).
- 23 September – Áine Ceannt, born Frances Brennan, revolutionary activist and humanitarian (died 1954).
- 4 October – Sim Walton, Kilkenny hurler (died 1966).
- 23 October – Una O'Connor, actress (died 1959).
- 3 November – Edward Barrett, athlete, wrestler and hurler, Olympic medallist.

== Deaths ==
- 6 February – Myles William Patrick O'Reilly, Catholic soldier and writer (born 1825).
- 26 February – Charles William Russell, Roman Catholic clergyman and scholar (born 1812).
- 2 March – John Benjamin Macneill, railway engineer (born 1793).
- 16 April – Edward Vaughan Hyde Kenealy, barrister and writer (born 1819).
- 7 June – John Brougham, actor and dramatist (born 1814).
- 12 September – Frederic Trench, 2nd Baron Ashtown, peer (born 1804).
- 18 October – Ann Jellicoe, educationalist (born 1823).
- 20 December – Joshua Spencer Thompson, Liberal-Conservative politician in Canada (born 1828).

== See also ==
- 1880 in Scotland
- 1880 in Wales
