= 1808 in Ireland =

- Centuries: 17th; 18th; 19th; 20th; 21st
- Decades: 1780s; 1790s; 1800s; 1810s; 1820s
- See also: 1808 in the United Kingdom; Other events of 1808; List of years in Ireland

Events from the year 1808 in Ireland.

== Events ==
- 2 February – Daniel Delany, Bishop of Kildare and Leighlin, founds the Patrician Brothers.
- 15 February – laying of the foundation stone for Nelson's Pillar in Dublin
- 6 June – the Bank of Ireland moves its premises to the former Irish Houses of Parliament on College Green, Dublin.
- 12 July – Lieutenant-General Sir Arthur Wellesley embarks troops at Cork to join the Peninsular War in Portugal.
- 15 August – seven men, including Edmund Rice, take religious promises under John Power, Bishop of Waterford and Lismore, as the Presentation Brothers.
- 22 August – the Roman Catholic Cathedral of St Mary and St Anne in Cork is dedicated.

== Arts and literature ==
- Mary Leadbeater's Poems published.
- Rev. Charles Maturin's novel The Wild Irish Boy published under the pseudonym Dennis Jasper Murphy.
- Thomas Moore's A Selection of Irish Melodies (first two volumes) published.

== Births ==
- 15 May – Michael William Balfe, composer (died 1870).
- Anne Elizabeth Ball, phycologist (died 1872).
- Joseph Francis Olliffe, physician (died 1869).

== Deaths ==
- 10 February – Hugh Douglas Hamilton, artist (b. c1734).
- 30 September – Peter Russell, gambler, government official, politician and judge in Upper Canada (born 1733).

== See also ==
- 1808 in Scotland
- 1808 in Wales
