= 1868 in Ireland =

- Centuries: 17th; 18th; 19th; 20th; 21st
- Decades: 1840s; 1850s; 1860s; 1870s; 1880s
- See also: 1868 in the United Kingdom; Other events of 1868; List of years in Ireland

Events from the year 1868 in Ireland.

== Events ==
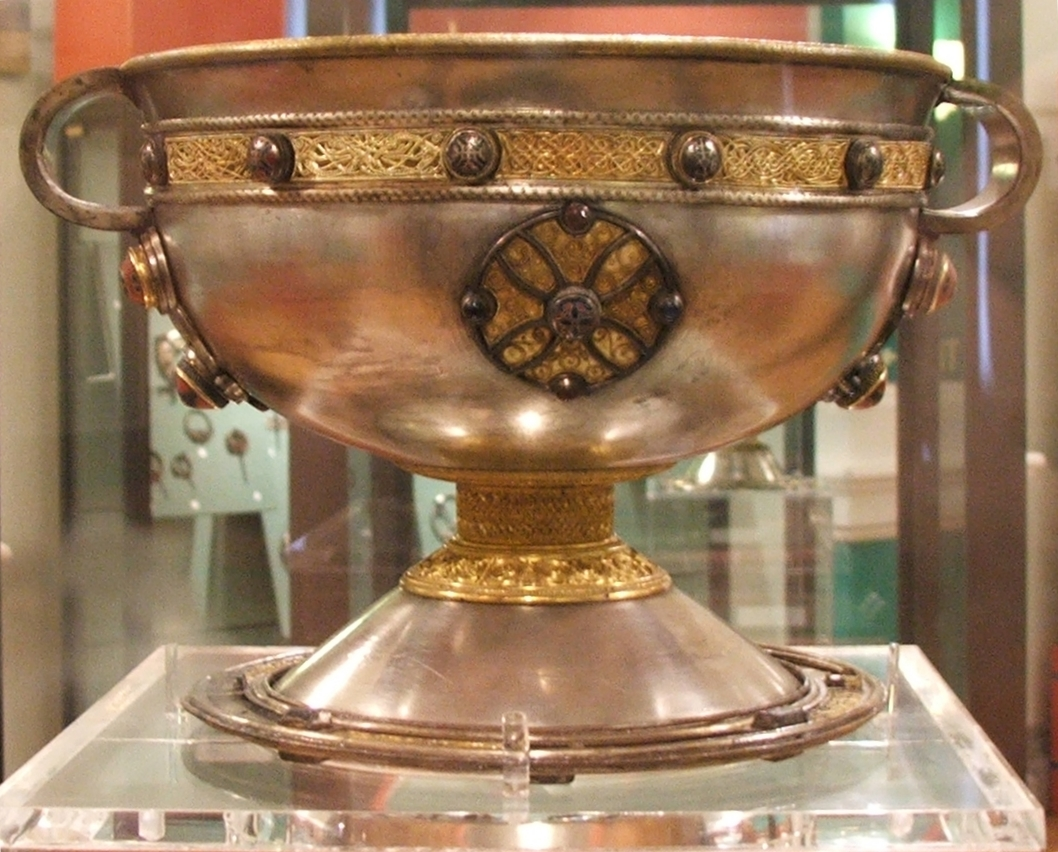
The Ardagh Chalice: made in the 8th century, buried c. 1740 and rediscovered in 1868.

- January – American transport entrepreneur George Francis Train is arrested in Cork for debt and spends much of the year imprisoned in Ireland.
- 26 May – Michael Barrett, member of the Fenians, hanged outside the walls of Newgate Prison in London for his part in the Clerkenwell explosion of 1867. He will be the last person publicly executed in the United Kingdom.
- 13 July – Representation of the People (Ireland) Act extends the franchise in parliamentary boroughs.
- 15 July – foundation stone of St Colman's Cathedral, Cobh, laid.
- August – meteorological observatory set up on Valentia Island.
- late September – the Ardagh Hoard is discovered at Ardagh Fort, County Limerick.
- 18 December – Thomas O'Hagan is appointed Lord Chancellor of Ireland, the first Roman Catholic to hold the chancellorship since the reign of James II.
- Methodist College Belfast opens to pupils.

== Sport ==
=== Hare coursing ===
- Waterloo Cup won by Master McGrath.

== Births ==
- 26 January – Beatrice Hill-Lowe, archer (died 1951).
- 2 February – Frederic Trench, 3rd Baron Ashtown, peer (died 1946).
- 4 February – Constance Gore-Booth (later Markievicz), Sinn Féin and Fianna Fáil TD, member of First Dáil, cabinet minister (died 1927).
- 7 February – Aleen Cust, veterinary surgeon (died 1937 visiting Jamaica).
- 14 April – Annie S. D. Maunder, née Russell, astronomer (died 1947).
- 25 April – Willie Maley, Association football player and manager (died 1958 in Scotland).
- 1 May – George F. O'Shaunessy, Democrat U.S. Representative from Rhode Island (died 1934).
- 7 May – John MacBride, republican (executed 1916).
- 26 May – Richard Maunsell, steam locomotive designer (died 1944 in Ireland).
- 5 June – James Connolly, socialist, trade unionist, nationalist, rebel and Easter Rising leader (executed 1916).
- 7 June – John Sealy Townsend, mathematical physicist (died 1957).
- 23 June – Francis Browning, cricketer (died 1916).
- 9 August – Patrick McKenna, Roman Catholic Bishop of Clogher, 1909–1942 (died 1942).
- 14 September – Arthur Gore, 6th Earl of Arran, Anglo-Irish peer and soldier (died 1958).
  Full date unknown
  - P. J. Brady, Irish Nationalist Member of UK Parliament for Dublin St Stephen's Green (died 1943).

== Deaths ==
- 9 January – John Henry Hopkins, first bishop of Episcopal Diocese of Vermont and eighth Presiding Bishop of the Episcopal Church in the United States of America (born 1792).
- 7 February – Admiral Theobald Jones, lichenologist and Unionist politician (born 1790).
- 19 February – Dominick Daly, Governor of Prince Edward Island, later Governor of South Australia (born 1798).
- 7 April – D'Arcy McGee, journalist, politician in Canada, assassinated (born 1825).
- 21 April – Henry James O'Farrell, hanged in Australia for attempted assassination of Prince Alfred, Duke of Edinburgh.
- 19 May – Benjamin Guinness, brewer and philanthropist (born 1798).
- 26 May – Michael Barrett, Fenian (executed).
- 17 June – Samuel Hill Lawrence, recipient of the Victoria Cross for gallantry in 1857 at Lucknow, India (born 1831).
- 25 June – Alexander Mitchell, engineer and inventor of the screw-pile lighthouse (born 1780).
- 26 July – Peter Gill, recipient of the Victoria Cross for gallantry in 1857 in Benares, India (born 1831).
- 3 August – Charles Graham Halpine, journalist, editor and author (born 1829).
- 20 August – Henry Maxwell, 7th Baron Farnham, politician and peer (born 1799).
- 26 December – Richard Mayne, barrister and joint first Commissioner of Police of the Metropolis, head of the London Metropolitan Police (1829–1868) (born 1796).

== See also ==
- 1868 in Scotland
- 1868 in Wales
