= 1815 in Ireland =

- Centuries: 17th; 18th; 19th; 20th; 21st
- Decades: 1790s; 1800s; 1810s; 1820s; 1830s
- See also: 1815 in the United Kingdom; Other events of 1815; List of years in Ireland

Events from the year 1815 in Ireland.

== Events ==
- February 2 - Daniel O'Connell fatally wounds Norcotte D'Esterre in a duel after being challenged by D'Esterre.
- March 28 – laying of the foundation stone of the Metropolitan Chapel (later known as the Catholic Pro-Cathedral), Marlborough Street, Dublin.
- March – poet William Drennan's Fugitive pieces in verse and prose published in Belfast.
- June 4 – lighthouse on Tuskar Rock first illuminated.
- July 6 – Charles Bianconi runs his first car (i.e. horse-drawn carriage) for conveyance of passengers, from Clonmel to Cahir.
- The river paddle steamer City of Cork is launched at Passage West, the first steamboat built in Ireland.
- The Religious Sisters of Charity are founded by Mary Aikenhead in Dublin.
- The Dublin Society purchases Leinster House, home of the Duke of Leinster, and founds a natural history museum there.
- Tenter House erected in Cork Street, Dublin, financed by Thomas Pleasants.
- St. Brendan's Hospital officially opened as the Richmond Lunatic Asylum, a national institution.

== Births ==
- March – William Wilde, surgeon, author and father of Oscar Wilde (died 1876).
- 11 June – Hans Crocker, lawyer and Wisconsin politician (died 1889).
- 24 July – Arnaud-Michel d'Abbadie, geographer (died 1893).
- 24 July – John Thomas Ball, lawyer, politician and Lord Chancellor of Ireland, 1875–1881 (died 1898).
- August – Edmond Burke Roche, 1st Baron Fermoy, politician (died 1874).
- 3 November – John Mitchel, nationalist activist, solicitor and journalist (died 1875).
- 31 December – Chartres Brew, Gold commissioner, Chief Constable and judge in the Colony of British Columbia (died 1870).
- Full date unknown – Alfred Elmore, painter (died 1881).

== Deaths ==
- 31 December – Thomas Burke, artist (born 1749).
- Ellen Hutchins, botanist (born 1785).

== See also ==
- 1815 in Scotland
- 1815 in Wales
