= 1810 in Ireland =

- Centuries: 17th; 18th; 19th; 20th; 21st
- Decades: 1790s; 1800s; 1810s; 1820s; 1830s
- See also: 1810 in the United Kingdom; Other events of 1810; List of years in Ireland

Events from the year 1810 in Ireland.

== Events ==
- 3 July – Royal Belfast Academical Institution foundation stone laid.

== Births ==
- 3 January – Antoine Thomson d'Abbadie, geographer (died 1897).
- 10 March – Samuel Ferguson, poet, barrister, antiquarian, artist and public servant (died 1886).
- 3 June – Robert Mallet, geologist, civil engineer and inventor (died 1881).
- 3 September – Paul Kane, painter in Canada (died 1871).
- 27 September – Michael O'Connor, first Catholic Bishop of Pittsburgh, Pennsylvania, first Catholic Bishop of Erie, Jesuit (died 1872).
  Full date unknown
  - Elliot Warburton, travel writer and novelist (died 1852).

== Deaths ==
- 17 January – James Gordon, merchant, soldier, and politician in America (born 1739).
- 16 February – Simon Vierpyl, English builder, sculptor and stone carver active in Ireland, died in Athy (born 1725)
- 18 February – Charles FitzGerald, 1st Baron Lecale, politician (born 1756).
- 24 March – Mary Tighe, poet (born 1772).

== See also ==
- 1810 in Scotland
- 1810 in Wales
