= 1816 in Ireland =

- Centuries: 17th; 18th; 19th; 20th; 21st
- Decades: 1790s; 1800s; 1810s; 1820s; 1830s
- See also: 1816 in the United Kingdom; Other events of 1816; List of years in Ireland

Events from the year 1816 in Ireland.

== Events ==
- The Year Without a Summer – famine and typhoid kill 65,000 people by 1819.
- January – Belfast Savings Bank opens for business.
- 30 January – wrecking of the Sea Horse, Boadicea and Lord Melville (military transport ships) off Tramore in a gale with the loss of over 500 persons.
- 17 March – Richmond Bridge, designed by James Savage, is opened over Dublin's River Liffey.
- May – the Ha'penny Bridge is opened over Dublin's River Liffey.
- 18 May – the National Institution for the Education of Deaf and Dumb Children of the Poor in Ireland is founded.
- June – St. George's Church, Belfast, is opened, the oldest in the city built for the United Church of England and Ireland.
- 29–30 October – Wildgoose Lodge Murders: eight people are burned to death by a gang in County Louth.
- Templemore Town Hall is built in County Tipperary.

== Births ==
- 6 February – John Joseph Lynch, Bishop of Toronto (died 1888).
- 1 March – Charles Magill, member of the 1st Canadian Parliament and mayor of Hamilton (died 1898).
- 14 March – Anthony O'Grady Lefroy, government official in Western Australia (died 1897).
- 8 April – Frederick William Burton, painter (died 1900).
- 12 April – Charles Gavan Duffy, nationalist and Australian colonial politician (died 1903).
- 31 July – Trevor Chute, British Army officer (died 1886).
- 17 September – John Hawkins Hagarty, lawyer, teacher and judge in Canada (died 1900).
- 30 October – Richard Quain, physician (died 1898).
  Full date unknown
  - John Drummond, early settler and explorer in Western Australia, first Inspector of Native Police there (died 1906).
  - John O'Mahony, a founding member of the Fenian Brotherhood (died 1877).

== Deaths ==
- 24 April – James Orr, rhyming weaver poet (born 1770).
- 3 May – James McHenry, signer of the United States Constitution from Maryland, third United States Secretary of War (born 1753).
- 7 July – Richard Brinsley Sheridan, playwright and statesman (born 1751).
  Full date unknown
  - Robert Fagan, painter, diplomat and archaeologist (b. c1761).

== See also ==
- 1816 in Scotland
- 1816 in Wales
