= 1812 in Ireland =

- Centuries: 17th; 18th; 19th; 20th; 21st
- Decades: 1790s; 1800s; 1810s; 1820s; 1830s
- See also: 1812 in the United Kingdom; Other events of 1812; List of years in Ireland

Events from the year 1812 in Ireland.

== Events ==
- 1 October – English balloonist James Sadler starts a balloon flight from Belvedere House near Mullingar in an attempt to cross the Irish Sea. He fails and almost drowns as a result.
- October – a storm washes away temporary barracks erected on Tuskar Rock for lighthouse construction, killing 14 workmen.
- Robert Peel, Chief Secretary for Ireland, introduces a mobile constabulary in Ireland, intended to be less partial than the yeomanry stationed in Ulster at this time, who are nearly all Orangemen.
- Landowner John D'Arcy is granted a patent to hold a market at his new town of Clifden.

== Births ==
- 14 May – Charles William Russell, Roman Catholic clergyman and scholar (died 1880).
- 19 May – Edwin Wyndham-Quin, 3rd Earl of Dunraven and Mount-Earl, peer (died 1871).
- 29 May – Thomas O'Hagan, 1st Baron O'Hagan, Lord Chancellor of Ireland (died 1885).
- 5 July – Frederick Edward Maning, writer and judge in New Zealand (died 1883).
- 12 July – C. P. Meehan, priest, poet and writer (died 1890).
- 4 November – James Alipius Goold, Roman Catholic Bishop and Archbishop of Melbourne (died 1886).
  Full date unknown
  - George Allman, naturalist, professor of natural history in Edinburgh (died 1898).
  - John Benson architect for Irish Industrial Exhibition, Great Industrial Exhibition (1853) and the 1855 Cork Opera House (died 1874)

== Deaths ==
- 25 April – Edmond Malone, Shakespeare scholar and literary critic (born 1741).
- 22 June – Richard Kirwan, scientist (born 1733).
- 2 August – Edward Smyth, sculptor (born 1749).
- 27 August – John Blaquiere, 1st Baron de Blaquiere, soldier and politician (born 1732).
  Full date unknown
  - Robert Owenson, actor and author (born 1744).

== See also ==
- 1812 in Scotland
- 1812 in Wales
