= 1898 in Ireland =

- Centuries: 17th; 18th; 19th; 20th; 21st
- Decades: 1870s; 1880s; 1890s; 1900s; 1910s
- See also: 1898 in the United Kingdom; Other events of 1898; List of years in Ireland

Events from the year 1898 in Ireland.

== Events ==
- By March – Dr. John F. Colohan of Dublin imports the first petrol driven car into Ireland, a Benz Velo.
- 6 July – Guglielmo Marconi conducts a test radio telegraph transmission for Lloyd's between Ballycastle, County Antrim, and Rathlin Island.
- 12 August – James Connolly launches the first issue of the Workers' Republic newsletter.
- 15 August – The foundation stone to an abortive Wolfe Tone memorial was laid at the Grafton Street corner of St Stephen's Green, Dublin as part of the centenary of the 1798 Rebellion commemorations. John O'Leary, nationalist and journalist, who was chair of the Dublin commemoration committee, laid the foundation stone.
- September – Tom Clarke is released after serving 15 years in Pentonville Prison.
- 20 October – George Curzon is created Baron Curzon of Kedleston, the last appointment to the Peerage of Ireland.
- The Local Government (Ireland) Act is introduced. It establishes popularly elected local authorities and gives qualified women a vote for the first time. County Tipperary is divided administratively into North Tipperary (county town: Nenagh) and South Tipperary (county town: Clonmel).
- The Mary Immaculate College in Limerick is founded to train Roman Catholic national school teachers.
- The Gaelic League holds its first feis at Macroom, County Cork.
- Work starts on the building of Belfast City Hall.
- Donegal Carpets is established.

== Arts and literature ==
- Eleanor Hull publishes The Cuchullin Saga in Irish Literature, being a collection of stories relating to the hero Cuchullin, translated from the Irish by various scholars.
- Peadar Ua Laoghaire's story Séadna begins serialisation as the first Irish language novel (published in book form 1904).
- Oscar Wilde publishes The Ballad of Reading Gaol.

== Sport ==
=== Football ===
- International
  19 February Wales 0–1 Ireland (in Llandudno)
  5 March Ireland 2–3 England (in Belfast)
  26 March Ireland 0–3 Scotland (in Belfast)
- Irish League
  Winners: Linfield
- Irish Cup
  Winners: Linfield 2–0 St Columb's Hall Celtic

== Births ==
- 6 January – James Fitzmaurice, pilot and aviation pioneer (died 1965)
- 7 February – Reginald N. Webster, businessman in America and Thoroughbred racehorse owner (died 1983)
- 13 February – Frank Aiken, Fianna Fáil TD and founding member, Cabinet Minister and Tánaiste (died 1983)
- 28 February – Hugh O'Flaherty, Catholic priest, saved about 4,000 Allied soldiers and Jews in the Vatican during World War II (died 1963)
- 18 April – Patrick Hennessy, industrialist (died 1981)
- 6 June – Ninette de Valois, founder of the Royal Ballet (died 2001)
- 4 October – Charles McCausland, cricketer (died 1965)
- 1 November – James Foley, cricketer (died 1969)
- 25 November – E. Chambré Hardman, photographer (died 1988)
- 29 November – C. S. Lewis, novelist, author of The Chronicles of Narnia (died 1963)
- Full date unknown – Liam Deasy, Irish Republican Army officer in the Irish War of Independence and the Irish Civil War (died 1974)

== Deaths ==
- 12 January – Daniel Connor, convict transported to Western Australia, businessman (born 1831)
- 25 January – Frederick Dobson Middleton, British general noted for his service particularly in the North-West Rebellion (born 1825)
- 14 February – Arthur Gwynn, cricketer and rugby player (born 1874)
- 13 March – Richard Quain, physician (born 1816)
- 17 March – John Thomas Ball, lawyer, politician and Lord Chancellor of Ireland, 1875–1881 (born 1815)
- 24 March – George Thomas Stokes, ecclesiastical historian (born 1843)
- 28 March – Sir John Arnott, businessman (born 1814 in Scotland)
- 1 April – Samuel Davidson, biblical scholar (born 1806)
- 11 May – Dalton McCarthy, lawyer and politician in Canada (born 1836)
- 29 June – William Knox Leet, recipient of the Victoria Cross for gallantry in 1879 at Inhlobana, Zululand, South Africa (born 1833)
- 13 August – Charles Frederick Houghton, soldier and politician in Canada (born 1839)
- 24 November – George James Allman, naturalist, Emeritus Professor of Natural History in Edinburgh (born 1812)
- 1 December – Charles Magill, member of the 1st Canadian Parliament and mayor of Hamilton (born 1816)

== See also ==
- 1898 in Scotland
- 1898 in Wales
