= 1818 in Ireland =

- Centuries: 17th; 18th; 19th; 20th; 21st
- Decades: 1790s; 1800s; 1810s; 1820s; 1830s
- See also: 1818 in the United Kingdom; Other events of 1818; List of years in Ireland

Events from the year 1818 in Ireland.

== Events ==
- 6 January – opening of General Post Office (Dublin).
- 22 April–26 May – Select Committee of the House of Commons inquires into fever in Ireland. Typhus epidemic continues.
- Mid-May – Paddle steamer Thames makes the first steamboat passage from the Clyde to Dublin.
- 30 May – Fever Hospitals Act.
- 13–14 June – Rob Roy makes the first steamboat passage from the Clyde to Belfast.
- Restoration of Down Cathedral completed.
- The Irish Society for Promoting the Education of the Native Irish through the Medium of Their Own Language is founded in Dublin by members of the Church of Ireland, the main movers being Henry Joseph Monck Mason and Bishop Robert Daly.
- Highwayman and rapparee Captain Gallagher surrenders to the authorities, is tried at Foxford and executed at Castlebar.

== Arts and literature ==
- Rev. Patrick Brontë's anonymous "modern tale" The Maid of Killarney is published in London.
- Sydney Owenson publishes her Florence Macarthy: an Irish tale.
- William Blacker writes the song "The Crimson Banner", commemorating the 1689 siege of Derry.

== Births ==
- 28 January – Robert Carew, 2nd Baron Carew, politician (died 1881).
- 4 March – Tobias Mullen, bishop of the Roman Catholic Diocese of Erie (died 1900).
- 4 April – Thomas Mayne Reid, novelist (died 1883).
- 25 April – Gustavus Vaughan Brooke, actor (lost at sea 1866).
- April – Cecil Frances Humphreys Alexander, hymn-writer and poet (died 1895).
- 24 May – J. H. Foley, sculptor (died 1874).
- 19 June – Hugh Law, lawyer and politician (died 1883).
- 21 June – Sir Richard Wallace, 1st Baronet, art collector and MP (died 1890).
- 20 August – John Ball, politician, naturalist and Alpine traveller (died 1889).
- 11 October – Martin Crane, first suffragan bishop of the Roman Catholic Diocese of Sandhurst in Australia (died 1901).
- 12 October – John Cuffe, 3rd Earl of Desart, Conservative politician (died 1865).
- 28 November – John Lane, Ontario politician (died after 1879).
- December – Thomas Roberts Ferguson, Ontario businessman and politician (died 1879).
  Full date unknown
  - Alexander Armstrong, naval surgeon, explorer and author (died 1899).
  - Catherine Hayes, opera diva (died 1861).
  - Samuel Kelly, coal merchant (died 1877).
  - Thomas Kerr Lynch, explorer (died 1891).
  - Andrew George Malcolm, physician (died 1856).

== Deaths ==
- 27 January – John Hamilton, 1st Marquess of Abercorn, politician (born 1756).
- 29 January – Sackville Hamilton, politician (born 1732).
- 31 January – Richard O'Reilly, Roman Catholic Archbishop of Armagh and Primate of All Ireland (born 1746).
- 4 August – Tom Molineaux, bare-knuckle heavyweight boxer (born 1784 in the United States).
- 11 August – Sir Vere Hunt, politician (born 1761).
- October – Joseph Atkinson, dramatist (born 1743).
- 26 October – William Elliot, politician (born 1766).
- 23 December – Sir Philip Francis, politician and pamphleteer (born 1740).
  Full date unknown
  - Riocard Bairéad, poet and United Irishman (possible date) (born c.1740).
  - Timothy Murphy, sniper in American Revolutionary War (born 1751).

== See also ==
- 1818 in Scotland
- 1818 in Wales
