= 1882 in Ireland =

- Centuries: 17th; 18th; 19th; 20th; 21st
- Decades: 1860s; 1870s; 1880s; 1890s; 1900s
- See also: 1882 in the United Kingdom; Other events of 1882; List of years in Ireland

Events from the year 1882 in Ireland.

== Events ==
- 3 February – The Queen's University of Ireland was dissolved under the University Education (Ireland) Act 1879, replaced by the Royal University of Ireland (RUI) established on 27 April 1880.
- 2 May – "Kilmainham Treaty", an agreement between the Government of the United Kingdom under William Ewart Gladstone and the gaoled Irish nationalist leader Charles Stewart Parnell extending the terms of the Land Law (Ireland) Act 1881 to abate tenant rent arrears, is announced in Parliament.
- 6 May – Phoenix Park Murders: Lord Frederick Cavendish, the newly appointed Chief Secretary for Ireland, and Thomas Henry Burke, his Permanent Undersecretary (the primary target), are fatally stabbed in Phoenix Park, Dublin, by members of the "Irish National Invincibles" (militant Irish republicans).
- July – James Connolly arrives in Ireland for the first time when his British Army regiment is posted to Cork.
- 15 August – The O'Connell Monument is unveiled on Sackville Street, Dublin "with much splendour".

== Arts and literature ==
- 2 February – Birth of James Joyce, novelist and poet, in Rathgar, Dublin.

== Sport ==
=== Football ===
- International
  18 February Ireland 0–13 England (in Belfast). First Irish international match.
  25 February Wales 7–1 Ireland (in Wrexham). First Irish international goal scored by RS Johnston of Distillery.
  Irish Cup
  Winners: Queens Island 1–0 Cliftonville
- Glentoran F.C. established in Belfast.

== Births ==
- 17 January – Henry George Farmer, musicologist (died 1965).
- 2 February – James Joyce, novelist (died 1941).
- 9 February – James Stephens, novelist and poet (died 1950).
- 28 February – Pádraic Ó Conaire, journalist and writer (died 1928).
- 17 March – Alfie Byrne, Irish Nationalist politician, served both as an MP in the British House of Commons and as a TD in Dáil Éireann (died 1956).
- 2 April – Estella Solomons, painter (died 1968).
- 24 April – Jack Rochford, Kilkenny hurler (died 1953).
- 16 May – Herbert Hughes, musicologist, composer and critic (died 1937).
- 1 July – Brian O'Higgins, Sinn Féin MP and President (died 1963).
- 2 August – Bryan Cusack, doctor, Sinn Féin MP, member First Dáil (died 1973).
- 5 August – Anne Acheson, sculptor (died 1962)
- 25 August – Seán T. O'Kelly, founding member of Fianna Fáil, Cabinet Minister and second President of Ireland (died 1966).
- 16 September – Thomas Sadleir, genealogist (died 1957).
- 17 September – Darrell Figgis, writer, Sinn Féin activist and independent politician (suicide 1925 in London).
- 2 October – Dick Fitzgerald, Kerry Gaelic footballer (died 1930).
- 6 October – William John English, recipient of the Victoria Cross for gallantry in 1901 at Vlakfontein, South Africa (died 1941).
- 11 October – John D'Alton, Cardinal Archbishop of Armagh and Primate of All Ireland from 1946 to 1963 (died 1963).
- 14 October – Éamon de Valera, President, Taoiseach and Founder of Fianna Fáil, born in Manhattan, New York (died 1975).
- 21 October – George Gavan Duffy, barrister, Sinn Féin MP (died 1951).
- 11 November – T. F. O'Rahilly, linguist and Irish language scholar (died 1953)
- 20 November – John Aston, cricketer (died 1951).
- 21 November
  - Anthony Mulvey, editor and Nationalist Party MP (died 1957).
  - Thomas J. O'Connell, trade unionist, Labour Party leader, TD and Senator (died 1969).

== Deaths ==
- 28 February – John Thomas Romney Robinson, astronomer and physicist (born 1792).
- 7 April – Denis Florence MacCarthy, poet, translator, biographer (born 1817).
- 17 April – Michael Hannan, Archbishop in Roman Catholic Archdiocese of Halifax, Nova Scotia (born 1821).
- 6 May – Thomas Henry Burke, Permanent Under Secretary at the Irish Office, assassinated in the Phoenix Park Murders (born 1829).
- 15 November – Patrick Murray, theologian (born 1811).
- 28 November – James Joseph McCarthy, architect (born 1817).
- 9 December – Sir Joseph Napier, 1st Baronet, Conservative Party MP and Lord Chancellor of Ireland (born 1804).

== See also ==
- 1882 in Scotland
- 1882 in Wales
