= 1804 in Ireland =

- Centuries: 17th; 18th; 19th; 20th; 21st
- Decades: 1780s; 1790s; 1800s; 1810s; 1820s
- See also: 1804 in the United Kingdom; Other events of 1804; List of years in Ireland

Events from the year 1804 in Ireland.

== Events ==
11 February – last surviving 1798 rebellion faction destroyed

- 14 January – Richard Lovell Edgeworth's semaphore line between Dublin and Galway is operational, but is out of use by the end of the year.
- 11 February – the last armed rebel group of the Society of United Irishmen, led by James Corcoran, is betrayed and killed or captured by yeomen near Enniscorthy.
- 4–5 March – Castle Hill convict rebellion in New South Wales led by Irish convicts in Australia.
- April – first boat passes through the Grand Canal throughout between the River Liffey in Dublin and the River Shannon.
- 14 May – Cork Street Fever Hospital, Dublin, opens in Cork Street, Dublin.
- First Martello Tower erected in Ireland, at Sutton, Dublin.

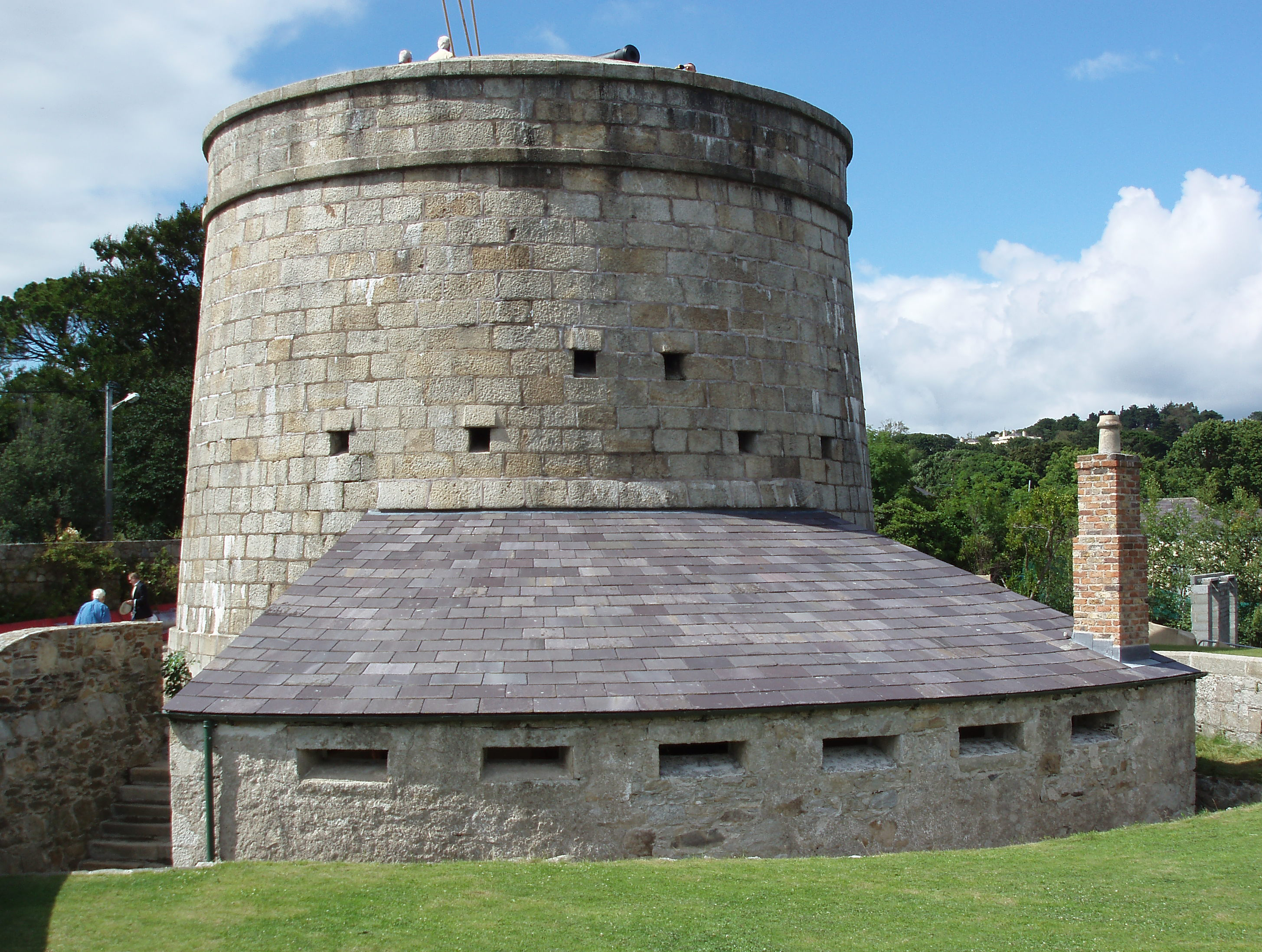
Martello tower (South No.7) at Killiney

== Births ==
- Early February – James Bronterre O'Brien, Chartist leader, reformer and journalist (died 1864).
- 4 April – Andrew Nicholl, painter (died 1886).
- 7 April – James Emerson Tennent, politician and traveller (died 1869).
- 18 November – John George, politician, judge and in 1859 Solicitor-General for Ireland (died 1871).
- 25 December – Frederic Trench, 2nd Baron Ashtown, peer (died 1880).
- 26 December – Sir Joseph Napier, 1st Baronet, Conservative Party MP and Lord Chancellor of Ireland (died 1882).
- 31 December – Francis Sylvester Mahony, humorist and poet (a.k.a. Father Prout) (died 1866).

== Deaths ==
- February – James Corcoran, rebel leader (born c.1770).
- 27 July – Robert Clements, 1st Earl of Leitrim, politician (born 1732).

== See also ==
- 1804 in Scotland
- 1804 in Wales
