= 1872 in Ireland =

- Centuries: 17th; 18th; 19th; 20th; 21st
- Decades: 1850s; 1860s; 1870s; 1880s; 1890s
- See also: 1872 in the United Kingdom; Other events of 1872; List of years in Ireland

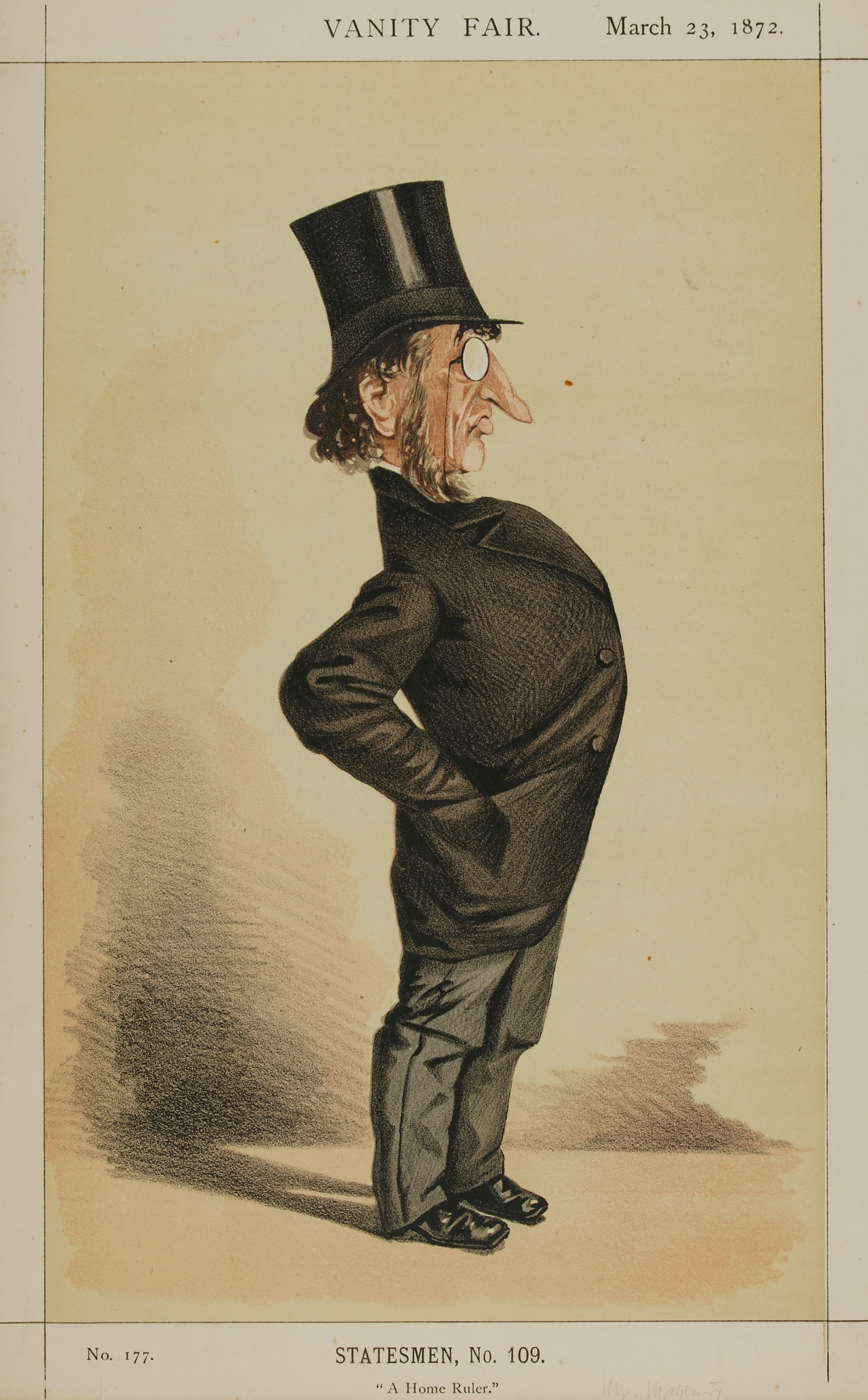
Statesmen No.109: Caricature of Mr John Francis Maguire Mr en:John Francis Maguire MP. Caption reads: "A Home Ruler" 1872

Events from the year 1872 in Ireland.

== Events ==
- Party Processions Acts repealed.
- Summer – about 30,000 Nationalists hold a demonstration at Hannahstown near Belfast, campaigning for the release of Fenian prisoners, but leading to another series of riots between Catholics and Protestants in the city.
- 23 November – 1872 Londonderry City by-election, the first Irish election to the Parliament of the UK held by secret ballot. The seat is won from the Liberal Party by the Irish Conservative Party's Charles Lewis.
- Ulster Hospital for Women and Sick Children is opened in Chichester Street, Belfast.

== Arts and literature ==
- Samuel Ferguson publishes his long poem Congal.
- Sheridan Le Fanu publishes his short-story collection In a Glass Darkly including the vampire novella Carmilla.
- Charles Lever publishes his last novel Lord Kilgobbin, "a tale of Ireland in our own time" (serialisation concludes and publication in book form).

== Births ==
- 14 February – Tom Ross, cricketer (died 1947).
- 31 March – Arthur Griffith, founder and third leader of Sinn Féin, served as President of Dáil Éireann (died 1922).
- 26 April – William Cunningham Deane-Tanner, later William Desmond Taylor, film director in United States (murdered 1922).
- 13 June – Blayney Hamilton, cricketer (died 1946).
- 4/7 July – John J. O'Kelly, politician, author and publisher, president of the Gaelic League and Sinn Féin (died 1957).
- 16 July – George Henry Morris, soldier, first commanding officer to lead an Irish Guards battalion into battle (killed in action 1914).
- 23 July – John J. McGrath, Democrat U.S. Representative from California (died 1951).
- 13 August – Robert Johnston, soldier, recipient of the Victoria Cross for gallantry in 1899 at the Battle of Elandslaagte, South Africa (died 1950).
- 4 September – James Magee, cricketer (died 1949).
- 23 September – Dan Comyn, cricketer (died 1949).
- 20 October – Seán O'Mahony, Sinn Féin MP (died 1934).
- 24 October – Peter O'Connor, athlete (born in Millom, England) (died 1957)
- 13 November – John M. Lyle, architect in Canada (died 1945).
- 28 November – Ethel Hobday, pianist (died 1947).
- Undated – Patrick R. Chalmers, writer (died 1942).

== Deaths ==
- 22 January – Valentine McMaster, Scottish military surgeon, recipient of the Victoria Cross for gallantry in 1857 at the Siege of Lucknow, India (born 1834 in British India).
- 8 February – Richard Bourke, 6th Earl of Mayo, statesman, three times Chief Secretary for Ireland, Viceroy of India, assassinated (born 1822).
- 1 June – Charles Lever, novelist (born 1806).
- 18 October – Michael O'Connor, first Catholic Bishop of Pittsburgh, Pennsylvania, first Catholic Bishop of Erie, Jesuit (born 1810).
- 23 November – Joseph Ward, recipient of the Victoria Cross for gallantry in 1858 at Gwalior, India (born 1832).
- 6 December – James Byrne, recipient of the Victoria Cross (born 1822).
  Full date unknown
  - Anne Elizabeth Ball, phycologist (born 1808).
  - Robert Patterson, businessman and naturalist (born 1802).

== See also ==
- 1872 in Scotland
- 1872 in Wales
