= 1809 in Ireland =

- Centuries: 17th; 18th; 19th; 20th; 21st
- Decades: 1780s; 1790s; 1800s; 1810s; 1820s
- See also: 1809 in the United Kingdom; Other events of 1809; List of years in Ireland

Events from the year 1809 in Ireland.

== Events ==
- October – completion of the Military Road across the Wicklow Mountains.
- 21 October – Nelson's Pillar opened in Sackville Street, Dublin.
- The first Roman Catholic Magdalene asylum in Ireland is opened in Cork.
- Blessington Street Basin was opened as a small drinking water reservoir in the north inner city of Dublin in 1809, paid for by Dublin Corporation. The reservoir was initially named after King George III, and was fed from a 1km-long canal spur that came off the main Royal Canal to meet Broadstone railway station at a harbour in front of it. The ground alone, covering merely an acre, cost the Corporation £1,052-9s-2d.

== Arts and literature ==
- Jonah Barrington's Historic Anecdotes and Secret Memoirs of the Legislative Union between Great Britain and Ireland is published.
- Edward Bunting's A General Collection of the Ancient Music of Ireland is published.

== Births ==
- 1 May – Samuel Blackall, soldier, politician and second Governor of Queensland, Australia (died 1871).
- James Duffy, author and publisher (died 1871).

== Deaths ==
- 8 October – Arthur Gore, 2nd Earl of Arran, politician (born 1734).

== See also ==
- 1809 in Scotland
- 1809 in Wales
