= 1874 in Ireland =

- Centuries: 17th; 18th; 19th; 20th; 21st
- Decades: 1850s; 1860s; 1870s; 1880s; 1890s
- See also: 1874 in the United Kingdom; Other events of 1874; List of years in Ireland

Events from the year 1874 in Ireland.

== Events ==
- 17 February – United Kingdom general election in Ireland in which 59 professing members of the Home Rule League are returned.
- 24 May – Queen Victoria creates her third eldest son, Prince Arthur, Duke of Connaught and Strathearn, after the province of Connaught.
- 26 July – the Roman Catholic Cathedral of the Immaculate Conception, Sligo, is opened.

== Births ==
- 28 January – Kathleen Lynn, physician and politician (died 1955).
- 15 February – Ernest Shackleton, explorer, remembered for his Antarctic expedition of 1914–1916 in the ship Endurance (died 1922).
- 24 February – Con Lucid, Major League Baseball player (died 1931).
- 29 March – Rupert Edward Cecil Lee Guinness, 2nd Earl of Iveagh, businessman, politician and philanthropist, Chancellor of the University of Dublin (died 1967).
- 24 April – Annie Moore, migrant to the United States (died c.1924).
- 25 April – Guglielmo Marconi, inventor (born in Bologna of Irish maternity) (died 1937)
- 29 April – Conal Holmes O'Connell O'Riordan, dramatist and novelist (died 1948).
- 13 May – Percy Redfern Creed, soldier, sportsman and writer (died 1964).
- 6 June – George Harman, cricketer and rugby player (died 1975).
- 11 June – Arthur Gwynn, cricketer and rugby player (died 1898).
- 14 June – Louis Lipsett, British Army and Canadian Expeditionary Force senior officer during the First World War (killed in action 1918).
- 18 July – Cathal Brugha, active in Easter Rising, Irish War of Independence, and Irish Civil War and was first Ceann Comhairle of Dáil Éireann, shot by Free State troops (died 1922).
- 18 July – Bob Lambert, cricketer (died 1956).
- 20 July
  - Jer Doheny, Kilkenny hurler (died 1929).
  - Monsignor Michael J. O'Doherty, Archbishop of Manila (died 1949)
- 11 August – John Philip Bagwell, general manager Great Northern Railway, Seanad member (died 1946).
- 17 September – Bernard Forbes, 8th Earl of Granard, soldier and politician (died 1948).
- 11 November – Louise McIlroy, Professor of Obstetrics and Gynaecology at the London School of Medicine for Women (died 1968).
- 1 December – Michael Mallin, second in command of Irish Citizen Army, participant in the Easter Rising (executed by firing squad in Kilmainham Jail 1916).
- 18 December – Philip Meldon, cricketer (died 1942).
  Full date unknown
  - Eamonn Duggan, lawyer, nationalist and politician (died 1936).
  - Patrick Hannon, Conservative and Unionist Party (UK) politician (died 1963).

== Deaths ==
- April – Biddy Early, traditional healer (born c. 1798).
- 26 July – Abraham Brewster, judge and Lord Chancellor of Ireland (born 1796).
- 27 August – John Henry Foley, sculptor (born 1818).
- 30 August – Michael Banim, writer (born 1796).
- 17 September – Edmond Burke Roche, 1st Baron Fermoy, politician (born 1815).
- 21 September – Arthur Jacob, ophthalmologist (born 1790).
- 17 October – John Benson, architect for Irish Industrial Exhibition, Great Industrial Exhibition (1853) and the 1855 Cork Opera House (born 1812).

== See also ==
- 1874 in Scotland
- 1874 in Wales
