= 1813 in Ireland =

- Centuries: 17th; 18th; 19th; 20th; 21st
- Decades: 1790s; 1800s; 1810s; 1820s; 1830s
- See also: 1813 in the United Kingdom; Other events of 1813; List of years in Ireland

Events from the year 1813 in Ireland.

== Events ==
- 26 July – Battle of Garvagh, County Londonderry: Four hundred Catholic Ribbonmen attempt to destroy a tavern in Garvagh where the Orange Lodge meet and are repelled by Protestants with muskets. This was commemorated in the song "The Battle of Garvagh".
- 10 September – the largest meteorite ever to fall on the British Isles lands at Adare, County Limerick. Now held in the Limerick Museum

== Arts and literature ==
- "Poetical Attempts by Hugh Porter, a County of Down weaver" published in Belfast.
- The Patron, or The Festival of Saint Kevin at the Seven Churches, Glendalough painted by Joseph Peacock.

== Births ==
- 6 January – Charles Lanyon, architect (born in England; died 1889).
- 3 February – Thomas Mellon, entrepreneur, lawyer, and judge founder of Mellon Bank (died 1908).
- 2 June – Daniel Pollen, politician, ninth Premier of New Zealand (died 1876).
- 7 June – Sir Thomas Burke, 3rd Baronet, landowner and politician (died 1875).
- 6 September – Isaac Butt, Irish Conservative Party MP and founder of the Home Rule League (died 1879).
- 10 November – Patrick Duggan, Roman Catholic Bishop of Clonfert (died 1896).
- 14 November – Benjamin Lett, bomber and arsonist in America and Canada (died 1858).
- 19 December – Thomas Andrews, chemist and physicist (died 1885).
- Undated
  - Margaret Haughery, baker and philanthropist in New Orleans (died 1882).
  - John Skipton Mulvany, architect (died 1870).

== Deaths ==
- 28 May – Edmund Garvey, painter (born 1740).
- 18 August – Friedrich Bridgetower, composer and cellist, brother of George Bridgetower, in Newry.
- Autumn – Henrietta Battier, poet, satirist and actress (born c. 1751).

== See also ==
- 1813 in Scotland
- 1813 in Wales
