= James Gogarty =

Member of the Irish Republican Brotherhood (1890–1921)

James Gogarty (1890–1921), was an Irish political figure. He took part in the Easter Rising in 1916; and was the first known Irish Republican Brotherhood (IRB) casualty of the Irish War of Independence.

Gogarty born on 23 March 1890 in the town of Nobber, County Meath, in Ireland. He rose to prominence as a rebel in the Easter Rising of 1916. Following a brief period of incarceration in the Welsh Prisoner of War Camp, Frangoch, where he first met future leader Michael Collins, he returned to Ireland and rejoined the IRB In 1921, he became the first known IRB death of the Irish War of Independence.

A life size bust of Gogarty is displayed inside Leinster House in Dublin, the seat of the Irish Parliament.
