= William MacCarthy-Morrogh =

Irish cricketer (1870–1939)

Personal information
- Full name: William Charles Frederick MacCarthy-Morrogh
- Born: 19 November 1870; Kerry, Ireland
- Died: 15 September 1939 (aged 68); Falmouth, Cornwall, England
- Batting: Left-handed
- Bowling: Slow left-arm orthodox

Domestic team information
- Years: Team
- 1895: Dublin University

Career statistics
Competition	First-class
Matches	1
Runs scored	3
Batting average	1.50
100s/50s	–/–
Top score	2
Balls bowled	95
Wickets	0
Bowling average	–
5 wickets in innings	–
10 wickets in match	–
Best bowling	–
Catches/stumpings	1/–
- Source: Cricinfo, 10 January 2022

William Charles Frederick MacCarthy-Morrogh (19 November 1870 in Kerry, Ireland – 15 September 1939 in Falmouth, Cornwall, England) was an Irish cricketer. A left-handed batsman and left-arm orthodox spin bowler, he played one first-class cricket match for Dublin University against the MCC in May 1895.
