= James Foley (cricketer) =

Irish cricketer

Personal information
- Full name: James Henry Foley
- Born: 1 November 1898; Macroom, Ireland
- Died: 30 March 1969 (aged 70); Cork, Munster, Ireland
- Batting: Right-handed

Domestic team information
- Years: Team
- 1926: Ireland

Career statistics
Competition	First-class
Matches	1
Runs scored	26
Batting average	13.00
100s/50s	–/–
Top score	16
Balls bowled	108
Wickets	0
Bowling average	–
5 wickets in innings	–
10 wickets in match	–
Best bowling	–
Catches/stumpings	–/–
- Source: Cricinfo, 2 January 2022

James Henry Foley (1 November 1898 – 30 March 1969) was an Irish cricketer. A right-handed batsman, he played just once for the Ireland cricket team, a first-class match against Wales in June 1926.
