= 1878 in Ireland =

- Centuries: 17th; 18th; 19th; 20th; 21st
- Decades: 1850s; 1860s; 1870s; 1880s; 1890s
- See also: 1878 in the United Kingdom; Other events of 1878; List of years in Ireland

Events from the year 1878 in Ireland.

== Events ==
- 22 May – launch of the experimental powered submarine Holland I, designed by Irish-born John Philip Holland, at Paterson, New Jersey. Its performance impresses the American Fenian Brotherhood sufficiently to induce them to finance his continued experiments with a view to using such a machine against the British.
- 24 August – the narrow gauge Ballymena and Larne Railway starts passenger operations in County Antrim, the first on the Irish 3 ft narrow gauge.
- 9 October – St Mary's Cathedral, Tuam (Church of Ireland) dedicated.
- 28 September – Intermediate Education Act passed: this will revolutionise Irish society, as it provides education to talented and hard-working boys and girls through "Exhibitions" (scholarships) worth up to $50. It particularly changes the position of women: by 1901 there will be 20,478 teachers in Ireland, 60% of them women, earning 80% of the male wage for the job.
- Mount St. Joseph Abbey, Roscrea established by Cistercian Trappist monks from Mount Melleray Abbey.
- Public Health (Ireland) Act 1878 introduces laws regarding sanitary districts.
- Mageough Home opens in Rathmines.

== Arts and literature ==
- The Kerry Sentinel newspaper begins publication in Tralee.
- Oscar Wilde leaves Ireland permanently.

== Sport ==
- Irish Cycling Association (ICA) is established to administer cycling as the sport becomes popular throughout Ireland.

== Births ==
- 8 January – Frederic Charles Dreyer, Royal Navy Admiral (died 1956).
- 1 February – Thomás MacDonagh, nationalist, poet, rebel and Easter Rising leader (executed 1916).
- 14 February – Daniel Corkery, writer, teacher and Fianna Fáil Senator (died 1964).
- 23 February – Pádraic Ó Máille, Sinn Féin MP and TD, Fianna Fáil Senator (died 1946).
- 13 March – Patrick McCartan, Sinn Féin MP and TD, member of First Dáil, candidate in the 1945 presidential election, a founder member of Clann na Poblachta (died 1966).
- 19 March – Michael James O'Rourke, soldier, recipient of the Victoria Cross for gallantry in 1917 at Hill 70 near Lens, France (died 1957).
- 31 March – Jamesy Kelleher, Cork hurler (died 1943).
- 11 April – Kathleen Clarke, née Daly, wife of Tom Clarke, Sinn Féin and later Fianna Fáil TD, Seanad member, first female Lord Mayor of Dublin (died 1972).
- 17 April – Thomas Harvey, cricketer and rugby player (died 1966).
- 3 June – Sinéad de Valera, née Ní Fhlannagáin, writer and wife of third President of Ireland, Éamon de Valera (died 1975).
- 12 June – Geoffrey Taylour, 4th Marquess of Headfort, peer (died 1943).
- 24 July – Edward Plunkett, 18th Baron Dunsany, writer and dramatist (died 1957).
- 9 August – Eileen Gray, architect and designer (died 1976).
- 15 August – Harry Corley, cricketer and rugby union international (died 1936).
- 17 August – Oliver St. John Gogarty, physician, poet and writer (died 1957).
- 24 August – Margaret Mary Pearse, Fianna Fáil TD and Seanad Éireann member, sister of Patrick Pearse (died 1968).
- 28 October – Helena Concannon, Fianna Fáil politician and historian (died 1952).
- 7 November – Margaret Cousins, née Gillespie, teacher, suffragist and Theosophist (died 1954 in India).
- 27 November – William Orpen, painter (died 1931).
- 23 December – Francis Sheehy-Skeffington, suffragist, pacifist and writer (murdered by British Army 1916).
- 30 December – Dick Walsh, Kilkenny hurler (died 1958).

== Deaths ==
- 22 March – Henry MacManus, artist (born c.1810)
- 2 April – William Clements, 3rd Earl of Leitrim, nobleman and landowner (born 1806).
- 22 September – Sir Richard John Griffith, 1st Baronet, geologist (born 1784).
- 24 October – Paul Cullen, Cardinal and Catholic Primate of Ireland (born 1803).
- 4 December – Richard Smyth, Presbyterian minister, academic and politician (born 1826).
- 22 December – Patrick Mylott, soldier, recipient of the Victoria Cross for gallantry in 1857 in India (born 1820).
- Full date unknown – Charles Anderson Read, journalist, novelist and anthologist (born 1841).

== See also ==
- 1878 in Scotland
- 1878 in Wales
