= John Lalor =

Irish journalist, author, and solicitor

- Born: 1814; Dublin, Ireland
- Died: 27 January 1856 (aged 42); Hampstead, London, England
- Occupations: Journalist, author, solicitor

John Lalor (1814–1856) was an Irish journalist, author, and solicitor.

== Early life and education ==
The son of John Lalor, a Roman Catholic merchant, Lalor was born in Dublin, and educated at a Catholic school at Carlow and Clongowes College. On 6 June 1831, he entered Trinity College, Dublin, where he earned a Bachelor of Arts in 1837.

== Career ==
After collecting evidence as an assistant poor-law commissioner, he left Ireland in 1836, and became connected with the daily press in London, first as a parliamentary reporter, and later for five or six years as one of the main editors of The Morning Chronicle, having social and domestic questions wholly under his direction. In 1838, he was admitted a solicitor in Dublin.

In 1839 Lalor obtained the prize of one hundred guineas awarded by the Central Society of Education for an essay called The Expediency and Means of Elevating the Profession of the Educator in Society.

In 1844, Lalor joined the Unitarian church, and undertook the editorship of the Unitarian weekly paper The Inquirer. He contributed articles on the Factories Act 1847, Ireland, and education. His last work for the press was Money and Morals: a Book for the Times, published in 1852.

== Death ==
Lalor died at Holly Hill, Hampstead, London, on 27 January 1856, aged 42.
