= 1873 in the United Kingdom =

- Other years
- 1871 | 1872 | 1873 | 1874 | 1875
- Constituent countries of the United Kingdom
- England | Ireland | Scotland | Wales
- Sport
- 1873 English cricket season Football: England

Events from the year 1873 in the United Kingdom.

== Incumbents ==
- Monarch – Victoria
- Prime Minister – William Ewart Gladstone (Liberal)

== Events ==
- January – Jane Senior is appointed an assistant inspector of workhouses, making her Britain's first female civil servant.
- 22 January – Northfleet, carrying emigrants for Tasmania, sinks at anchor off Dungeness after being rammed by a Spanish steamship with the death of 293 and 86 survivors.
- 3 March – first performance of W. S. Gilbert and Gilbert Arthur à Beckett's play The Happy Land at the Royal Court Theatre, London. The play creates a scandal by breaking regulations against the portrayal of public characters, parodying William Ewart Gladstone, Robert Lowe, and Acton Smee Ayrton, respectively the prime minister, Chancellor of the Exchequer, and First Commissioner of Works.
- 13 March – Gladstone resigns as Prime Minister but the Conservatives fail to form a government and Gladstone returns to office two days later.
- 31 March – Supreme Court of Judicature Act reforms the judiciary, establishing the Supreme Court and Court of Appeal of England and Wales and abolishing the Court of Common Pleas as a separate institution and, with it, the office of attorney at law.
- April – Ashanti attack British forts in the Gold Coast.
- c. April – J. S. Fry & Sons produce the UK's first chocolate Easter eggs.
- 1 April – the White Star liner RMS Atlantic sinks off Nova Scotia, 547 die.
- 2 April – the first sleeping car is introduced in Britain, on the Glasgow to London night express.
- 4 April – the Kennel Club, the world's first kennel club, is founded in London by Sewallis Shirley (MP).
- 20 May – in Chipping Norton, Oxfordshire, rioters attempt to free the Ascott Martyrs – sixteen women sentenced to imprisonment for attempting to dissuade strikebreakers in an agricultural labour dispute.
- June – Britain puts pressure on Sultan Sayyid Barghash bin Said of Zanzibar to enforce closure of the slave market in Zanzibar.
- 9 June – Alexandra Palace entertainment venue in north London is destroyed by fire only a fortnight after its opening.
- 18 June – Alice Vickery passes the Royal Pharmaceutical Society's examination, becoming the first qualified female pharmacist in the U.K.
- 27 September – Third Anglo-Ashanti War: Royal Engineers land on the Gold Coast (modern-day Ghana) to prepare for an attack on the Kingdom of Ashanti's ruler Kofi Karikari, who has been involved in the trading of slaves.
- October – Girton College opens as the first women's college in Cambridge.
- 26 November – British troops invade Ashanti territory.

=== Undated ===
- Elizabeth Garrett Anderson is admitted to membership of the British Medical Association. As the Association votes against the admission of further women in 1878, she remains the only woman member for nineteen years.
- Chemical company Brunner Mond established by John Brunner and Ludwig Mond who begin to build Winnington Works in Northwich, Cheshire.
- Work begins on the Natural History Museum, London.

== Publications ==
- Thomas Hardy's novel A Pair of Blue Eyes.
- James Clerk Maxwell's work A Treatise on Electricity and Magnetism.
- Walter Pater's collected Studies in the History of the Renaissance.
- Anthony Trollope's Palliser novel Phineas Redux (serialisation).
- First issue of the Cook's Continental Timetable

== Births ==
- 7 February – Thomas Andrews, Irish shipbuilder (died 1912 in sinking of the Titanic)
- 17 March – Margaret Bondfield, politician and trade unionist (died 1953)
- 19 April – Sydney Barnes, cricketer (died 1967)
- 25 April – Walter de la Mare, poet, short story writer and novelist (died 1956)
- 26 April – Roy Redgrave, silent film actor (died 1922)
- 8 May – Nevil Sidgwick, chemist (died 1952)
- 17 May – Dorothy Richardson, feminist writer (died 1957)
- 15 June – Leonora Cohen, née Throp, suffragette, trade unionist and feminist (died 1978)
- 21 July – Sir Morley Fletcher, physiologist and administrator (died 1933)
- 11 August – Bertram Mills, circus manager (died 1938)
- 25 September – Fawcet Wray, British admiral (died 1932)
- 21 November – Sir Vernon Kell ('K'), first director of MI5 (died 1942)
- 22 November – Johnny Tyldesley, cricketer (died 1930)
- 17 December – Ford Madox Ford, né Hueffer, novelist and literary editor (died 1939)
- 21 December – Bertram Dickson, Scottish soldier, explorer and pioneer aviator; involved in the world's first mid-air collision (died 1913)
- 22 December – Lily Montagu, pioneer of reform Judaism (died 1963)
- 26 December – Thomas Wass, Nottinghamshire cricketer (died 1953)

== Deaths ==
- 9 January – Napoleon III, deposed Emperor of the French (born 1808 in France)
- 18 January – Edward Bulwer-Lytton, 1st Baron Lytton, novelist (born 1803)
- 27 January – Adam Sedgwick, geologist (born 1875)
- 7 February – Sheridan Le Fanu, Irish Gothic fiction writer (born 1814)
- 7 March – Evelyn Denison, 1st Viscount Ossington, statesman (born 1800)
- 24 March – Mary Ann Cotton, serial poisoner (born 1832; hanged)
- 27 April – William Macready, actor (born 1793)
- 1 May – David Livingstone, Scottish explorer of Africa (born 1813)
- 7 May – John Stuart Mill, philosopher (born 1806)
- 19 June – David Robertson, 1st Baron Marjoribanks, stockbroker and politician (born 1797)
- 13 July – Caroline Clive, poet, novelist and letter-writer (born 1801; died in fire)
- 18 July – Sir David Salomons, banker and campaigner for emancipation of the Jews in England (born 1797)
- 20 July – Richard Bethell, 1st Baron Westbury, Lord Chancellor of Great Britain (born 1800)
- 24 July – George Glyn, 1st Baron Wolverton, banker (born 1797)
- 28 July – Frederick Sullivan, cricketer (born 1797)
- 17 September – Alexander Berry, adventurer and Australian pioneer (born 1781)
- 1 October – Sir Edwin Landseer, animal painter (born 1802)
- 9 October – John Evan Thomas, Welsh sculptor (born 1810)
- 17 October – Admiral Sir Robert McClure, Irish-born Arctic explorer (born 1807)
