= Arthur Bateman (cricketer) =

Irish cricketer

Personal information
- Born: 30 October 1890; County Cavan, Northern Ireland
- Died: 28 March 1918 (aged 27) near Arras, France
- Batting: Right-handed

International information
- National side: Ireland

Career statistics
Competition	First-class
Matches	2
Runs scored	149
Batting average	37.25
100s/50s	0/1
Top score	52
Catches/stumpings	2/–
- Source: CricketArchive, 6 December 2022

Arthur Cyril Bateman (30 October 1890 – 28 March 1918) was an Irish cricketer. A right-handed batsman, he played two first-class matches for Ireland, one in 1913, the other in 1914. Both were against Scotland.

Whilst fighting in the First World War, he was declared missing, presumed dead on 28 March 1918 near the town of Arras, France.
