= Francis Connell =

Irish cricketer (1902–1983)

Cricket information
- Batting: Right-handed

International information
- National side: Ireland

Career statistics
Competition	First-class
Matches	5
Runs scored	262
Batting average	26.20
100s/50s	0/2
Top score	87
Catches/stumpings	2/–
- Source: CricketArchive, 31 October 2022

Francis Gerard Connell (13 January 1902 – 16 March 1983) was an Irish cricketer. A right-handed batsman, he made his debut for Ireland in August 1934 against the MCC. He went on to play for Ireland on 11 occasions, his last match coming in July 1938, also against the MCC. Five of his matches for Ireland had first-class status.
