= 1869 in Ireland =

- Centuries: 17th; 18th; 19th; 20th; 21st
- Decades: 1840s; 1850s; 1860s; 1870s; 1880s
- See also: 1869 in the United Kingdom; Other events of 1869; List of years in Ireland

Events from the year 1869 in Ireland.

== Events ==
- July 26 – royal assent is given to the Irish Church Act 1869, disestablishing the Church of Ireland with effect from 1871 and abolishing payment of tithe, the legislation having passed through the House of Commons of the United Kingdom and House of Lords.
- August – anti-Irish riots at Pontlottyn in the Rhymney Valley of Wales result in one death.
- August 31 – scientist Mary Ward is killed in a steam car accident at Parsonstown, Ireland's first victim of a mechanically propelled road vehicle.

== Sport ==
=== Hare coursing ===
- Waterloo Cup won by Master McGrath.

=== Yachting ===
- The Royal Ulster Yacht Club of Bangor, County Down, receives its royal warrant.

== Births ==
- 16 March – Peter Maher, boxer (died 1940).
- 27 March – James McNeill, politician and second Governor-General of the Irish Free State (died 1938).
- 26 April – Lowry Hamilton, cricketer (died 1936).
- 19 May – John Wheatley, socialist politician (died 1930 in Scotland)
- 23 May – Hamilton Lyster Reed, recipient of the Victoria Cross for gallantry in 1899 at the Battle of Colenso, South Africa (died 1931).
- 29 May – William Harman, cricketer (died 1962).
- 1 August – Ambrose Upton Gledstanes Bury, politician in Alberta, Canada (died 1951).
- 6 August – David McKee Wright, poet (died 1928 in Australia).
- 30 November – James Hamilton, 3rd Duke of Abercorn, Unionist politician and first Governor of Northern Ireland (died 1953).
- 27 December – William Harrington, cricketer (died 1940).
- Helen Boyle, physician and psychologist (died 1957 in England)

== Deaths ==
- 30 January – William Carleton, writer (born 1794).
- 11 February – Patrick J. Whelan, tailor and alleged Fenian sympathizer, convicted of assassination of Thomas D'Arcy McGee in 1868, hanged (b. c1840).
- 2 March – Hugh Gough, 1st Viscount Gough, British Field Marshal (born 1779).
- 6 March – James Emerson Tennent, politician and traveller (born 1804).
- 14 March – Joseph Francis Olliffe, physician (born 1808).
- 26 March – John T. Mullock, Roman Catholic Bishop of St. John's, Newfoundland (born 1807).
- 31 August – Mary Ward, scientist (born 1827).
- 10 June – Joseph Prosser, recipient of the Victoria Cross for gallantry in 1855 at Sevastopol, Crimea (born 1833; died in Liverpool).

== See also ==
- 1869 in Scotland
- 1869 in Wales
