= 1895 in Ireland =

- Centuries: 17th; 18th; 19th; 20th; 21st
- Decades: 1870s; 1880s; 1890s; 1900s; 1910s
- See also: 1895 in the United Kingdom; Other events of 1895; List of years in Ireland

Events from the year 1895 in Ireland.

== Events ==
- February – Lough Neagh became covered with ice (an extremely rare occurrence), as part of the Great Frost.
- 22 March – the burned body of Bridget Cleary was discovered in County Tipperary; her husband, Michael, was subsequently convicted and imprisoned for manslaughter, his defence being a belief that he had killed a changeling left in his wife's place after she had been abducted by fairies.
- 3–5 April – Wilde v Queensberry: Oscar Wilde pressed a criminal libel case in London against the Marquess of Queensberry, who was defended by Edward Carson. Wilde loses the case.
- 25 May – Regina v. Wilde: Oscar Wilde was convicted of gross indecency and sentenced to two years' hard labour.
- 7 August – United Kingdom general election
  - Edward Carson was re-elected in a Trinity College Dublin seat and as senior MP became a member of the Privy Council of Ireland.
  - Michael Davitt entered the British House of Commons as the elected Member of Parliament for South Mayo. He had been refused entry on two previous attempts.
- 23 December – Grand Opera House in Belfast was opened.
- 24 December – Kingstown Lifeboat Disaster: the Kingstown Life-boat capsizes on service: all fifteen crew were lost.

== Full date unknown ==
- Belfast Botanic Gardens became a public park when Belfast Corporation purchased the gardens from the Belfast Botanical and Horticultural Society.

== Arts and literature ==
- 3 January – première of Oscar Wilde's comedy An Ideal Husband in London.
- 14 February – première of Oscar Wilde's last play, the comedy The Importance of Being Earnest, in London.
- 4 April – First Kinetoscope exhibition in Ireland advertised, at the Dublin premises of the Kinetoscope Company.

== Sport ==
=== Football ===
- International
  9 March England 9–0 Ireland (in Derby)
  16 March Ireland 2–2 Wales (in Belfast)
  30 March Scotland 3–1 Ireland (in Glasgow)
  Irish League
  Winners: Linfield
  Irish Cup
  Winners: Linfield 10–1 Bohemians
- 1 May – Dundela F.C. was founded in Belfast.
- c. September – Shelbourne F.C. was founded in the south Dublin suburb of Ringsend by a group of seven individuals, including James Rowan (St Margaret Place) and two Wall brothers Felix and Michael (Bath Avenue Place).

== Births ==
- 8 January – John Moyney, soldier, recipient of the Victoria Cross for gallantry in 1917 north of Broembeek, Belgium (died 1980).
- March – Joe Murphy, member of Irish Republican Army, (died 1920 on 76-day hunger strike during the Irish War of Independence).
- 25 May – Liam Mellowes, Sinn Féin politician, member of First Dáil (executed 1922 in Mountjoy Jail).
- 2 June – Seán McLoughlin, nationalist and communist activist (died 1960).
- 16 June – Warren Lewis, soldier and historian, brother of C. S. Lewis (died 1973).
- 28 July – John Charles McQuaid, Catholic Archbishop of Dublin and Primate of Ireland (died 1973).
- 3 August – James Samuel Emerson, soldier, posthumous recipient of the Victoria Cross for gallantry (killed 1917 on the Hindenburg Line north of La Vacquerie, France).
- 3 October – Phelim Calleary, Fianna Fáil TD (died 1974).
- 24 October – Lady Constance Mary Annesley, afterwards Constance Malleson, writer and actress (as Colette O'Niel) (died 1975).
- 10 December – Moyna Macgill, stage and film actress, mother of Angela Lansbury (died 1975).
- Full date unknown – Max Dunn, poet (died 1963 in Australia).

== Deaths ==
- 5 February – Robert Montresor Rogers, recipient of the Victoria Cross for gallantry in 1860 at the Taku Forts, China (born 1834).
- 11 May – Patrick Carlin, Victoria Cross recipient for gallantry in 1858 in India (born 1832).
- 14 August – Thomas Hovenden, artist and teacher (born 1840).
- 12 October – Cecil Frances Humphreys Alexander, hymn-writer and poet (born 1818).
- 26 November – George Edward Dobson, zoologist, photographer and army surgeon (born 1848).

== See also ==
- 1895 in Scotland
- 1895 in Wales
