= Thomas Henry (magistrate) =

Anglo-Irish police magistrate

Sir Thomas Henry (1807–1876) was an Anglo-Irish police magistrate.

== Life ==
Thomas was born in Dublin in 1807. He was the eldest son of David Henry of St. Stephen's Green, Dublin and head of the government contractor firm Henry, Mullins, & MacMahon. He was educated at Von Feinagle's school in that city and later studied at Trinity College, where he graduated B.A. 1824 and M.A. 1827.

On 23 January 1829, he was called to the bar at the Middle Temple, went the northern circuit, and attended the West Riding of Yorkshire sessions. He was magistrate at the Lambeth Street police-court, Whitechapel, from April 1840 until 1846. In 1846, he was transferred to Bow Street, became chief magistrate there 6 July 1864, and was knighted on 30 Nov. He discharged his duties with general approval.

He created the existing English law of extradition; the Extradition Act 1862, and the various treaties accordingly connecting England and foreign powers. He for many years served as the chief adviser of the English government on administrative and correctional police, and his opinion was acted upon in the various licensing bills, the betting acts, Sunday trading legislation, and similar measures.

He gave evidence before the committee on theatrical licenses, pointed out the position of music-halls and casinos as places of amusement, and advised as to the degree of police supervision they should be subjected to.

He died at his residence, 23 Hanover Square, London, on 16 June 1876, and was buried in the ground of St Thomas of Canterbury Church, Fulham, on 21 June 1876.
