= Daniel Devlin =

American politician (1814–1867)

Daniel Joseph Devlin (1814 – February 22, 1867) was a prosperous businessman, City Chamberlain, and prominent citizen of New York City.

Devlin was born at Buncrana, County Donegal, Ireland, in 1814, the son of Jeremiah Devlin, a farmer and merchant tailor, and his wife, Elizabeth Foster. As a young merchant tailor, Daniel emigrated to America in 1833. Three younger brothers later joined him in America; two sisters, and a brother, Phillip Devlin, who became a Catholic priest, remained in Ireland. Daniel Devlin moved to Louisville, Kentucky, and is believed to have worked for a time as a steamboat clerk on the Ohio and Mississippi rivers, which led him to encourage his brother William Devlin to establish himself in Louisiana. Devlin founded a jeans manufacturing company in Louisville, and later moved to New York City, where he and two of his brothers established a clothing company, Devlin Brothers. Daniel Devlin was named City Chamberlain of New York in 1861, and remained in that position until his death.

After the outbreak of the American Civil War, he headed the executive committee charged with recruitment and financing for the Irish Brigade of the Union Army. In politics, he was a Democrat, and played a prominent role in the New York State Democratic convention in 1864. He was a director of the Union Trust Company of New York, and a prominent Catholic layman who in 1863 helped found the Society for the Protection of Destitute Roman Catholic Children in the City of New York and in 1864 established a scholarship at St. Francis Xavier College. Devlin lived from the 1850s onward in an Italianate villa overlooking the Hudson River in Manhattanville.

Devlin died in New York on February 22, 1867. His brothers donated a stained glass window in his memory to St. Patrick's Cathedral, where it can be seen today.
