= 1876 in the United Kingdom =

Events from the year 1876 in the United Kingdom.

== Incumbents ==
- Monarch – Victoria
- Prime Minister – Benjamin Disraeli (Conservative)

== Events ==
- 1 January – the Bass Brewery Red Triangle becomes the first registered trademark symbol, under the Trade Mark Registration Act 1875.
- April – the Royal Titles Act 1876 (introduced by Prime Minister of the United Kingdom Benjamin Disraeli) grants Queen Victoria the title of Empress of India from 1877.
- 7 April – Robert Bulwer-Lytton, 1st Earl of Lytton, becomes Viceroy of India.
- 1 May – the Settle-Carlisle Railway is opened to passenger traffic.
- 16 May
  - Prime Minister Benjamin Disraeli rejects the Berlin Memorandum.
  - Adam Worth steals the Portrait of Georgiana, Duchess of Devonshire from Agnew's gallery in Old Bond Street, London three weeks after its sale at Christie's for 10,000 guineas, the highest price ever paid for a painting at auction at this time. It is not recovered until 1901.
- 24 May – Challenger expedition returns to Portsmouth.
- 13 July – the prosecution of Arthur Tooth, an Anglican clergyman, for using ritualist practices begins.
- August
  - The Prime Minister Benjamin Disraeli, is made Earl of Beaconsfield by Queen Victoria.
  - The Medical Act 1876 (39 & 40 Vict. c. 41) repeals the previous Medical Act in the United Kingdom and enables every university or other body in the United Kingdom entitled to grant qualifications for registration to grant such qualifications to all people without distinction of sex.
- 15 August – Elementary Education Act 1876 ("Sandon's Act") prevents employment of children under 10; permits local attendance committees to impose compulsory school attendance for ages 5–13; and authorises poor law guardians to pay school fees for the poor and destitute under a system of certificates.
- 5 September – William Gladstone's Bulgarian Horrors pamphlet is published.
- 7 October – first greyhound race to use an artificial hare is held, at Hendon.
- 10 December – the "observant stranger" Henry James arrives at Folkestone and subsequently (12 Dec) takes lodgings at 3 Bolton Street, London

=== Undated ===
- Charles Wells opens his brewery based in Bedford.
- The Conchological Society of Great Britain & Ireland is founded.
- Mary Sumner founds Christian women's organisation the Mothers' Union.
- Port Vale Football Club is formed.
- Stourbridge Football Club is formed.
- Saracens F.C. is formed in London as a rugby union club.
- Warrington Wolves is formed as Warrington Zingari F.C., a rugby league club.
- Stockport Lacrosse Club, thought to be the oldest existing lacrosse club in the world, is founded at Cale Green Cricket Club Davenport, Greater Manchester, where they will still be playing in the 21st century.
- Henry Wickham smuggles rubber seeds out of Brazil leading to the eventual collapse of the Amazon rubber boom.
- Grey squirrel introduced to England at Henbury Park, Cheshire.

== Publications ==
- Isabella Banks' novel The Manchester Man.
- Walter Besant and James Rice's novel The Golden Butterfly.
- Lewis Carroll's nonsense poem The Hunting of the Snark.
- George Eliot's novel Daniel Deronda.
- Anthony Trollope's book The Prime Minister, fifth of the Palliser novels.

== Births ==
- 13 January – Florence Sulman, author and educationalist (died 1965 in Australia)
- 21 January – James Larkin, trade union leader and socialist politician in Ireland (died 1947 in Ireland)
- 29 January – Havergal Brian, composer (died 1972)
- 16 February – G. M. Trevelyan, historian (died 1962)
- 7 March – Edgar Evans, Welsh sailor, Antarctic explorer (died 1912)
- 11 March – Carl Ruggles, composer (died 1971)
- 23 March – Muirhead Bone, Scottish etcher (died 1953)
- 28 April – Thomas Crisp, Victoria Cross recipient (died 1917)
- 7 May – Samuel Courtauld, art collector (died 1947)
- 27 May – William Stanier, railway engineer and steam locomotive designer (LMS Coronation Class) (died 1965)
- 13 June – William Sealy Gosset, chemist (died 1937)
- 19 June – Nigel Gresley, railway engineer and steam locomotive designer (Flying Scotsman and Mallard) (died 1941)
- 22 June – Gwen John, Welsh painter (died 1939)
- 8 August
  - Charles Hamilton, children's story writer (died 1961)
  - Sophia Duleep Singh, Princess and suffragette (died 1948)
- 17 August – Eric Drummond, 16th Earl of Perth, politician (died 1951)
- 25 August – Eglantyne Jebb, champion for children (died 1928)
- 1 September – Harriet Shaw Weaver, political activist (died 1961)
- 6 September – John Macleod, Scottish physiologist, Nobel Prize laureate (died 1935)
- 6 October – Githa Sowerby, dramatist (died 1970)
- 2 November – William Haywood, architect (died 1957)
- 3 November – Rupert D'Oyly Carte, hotelier and theatrical impresario (died 1948)
- 7 November – Charlie Townsend, cricketer (died 1958)
- 26 November – Janet Philip, School Secretary at the London School for Economics (died 1959)
- 29 December – Lionel Tertis, violist (died 1975)

== Deaths ==
- 19 January – George Julius Poulett Scrope, political economist (born 1797)
- 3 April – Mary Fildes, political activist (born c. 1789 in Ireland)
- 19 April – Samuel Sebastian Wesley, organist and composer (born 1810)
- 24 May – Henry Kingsley, novelist (born 1830)
- 27 June – Harriet Martineau, philosopher and social theorist (born 1802)
- 14 July - Thomas Hazlehurst, chemical manufacturer and Methodist chapel builder (born 1816)
- 17 July – Francis Conyngham, 2nd Marquess Conyngham, soldier, courtier and politician (born 1797)
- 19 August – George Smith, Assyriologist (born 1840)
- 24 August – John Roberton, Scottish physician and social reformer (born 1797)
- 16 September – Hedworth Lambton, politician (born 1797)
- 18 October – Sir Thomas Dickson Archibald, judge (born 1817 in Nova Scotia)
- 29 December – Sir Titus Salt, woollen manufacturer and philanthropist (born 1803)
