= 1817 in Ireland =

- Centuries: 17th; 18th; 19th; 20th; 21st
- Decades: 1790s; 1800s; 1810s; 1820s; 1830s
- See also: 1817 in the United Kingdom; Other events of 1817; List of years in Ireland

Events from the year 1817 in Ireland.

== Events ==
- 26 May – completion of Royal Canal throughout from Dublin to the River Shannon at Tarmonbarry.
- 31 May – first stone of new pier at the port of Dunleary is laid.
- 16 June – Poor Law Employment Act empowers the Lord Lieutenant to appoint commissioners of public works to supervise construction of public works to relieve unemployment financed by mortgages of rates.
- 17 June – first stone of Wellington Testimonial, Dublin, is laid in Phoenix Park.
- 11 July – an act to provide for the establishment of asylums for the lunatic poor in Ireland.
- c. July – tradesman Jeffery Sedwards establishes the Skibbereen Abstinence Society, considered the first organisation devoted to teetotalism in Europe.
- 7 August – first stone of Wellington Column is laid in Trim, County Meath.
- 30 September – national fever committee appointed to distribute government relief to victims of the typhus epidemic (October 1816–December 1819).
- Edward O'Reilly's Irish-English Dictionary is published.

== Arts and literature ==
- 19 April – Charles Wolfe's poem The Burial of Sir John Moore at Corunna is first published in the Newry Telegraph.
- 27 May – Thomas Moore's poem Lalla-Rookh: an Oriental romance is first published in London.
- June – Maria Edgeworth's novel Ormond: a tale is first published in London together with Harrington.

== Births ==
- 6 January – J. J. McCarthy, architect (died 1882).
- 10 March – Patrick Neeson Lynch, bishop of the Roman Catholic Diocese of Charleston (South Carolina) (died 1882 in the United States).
- 26 May – Denis Florence MacCarthy, poet, translator and biographer (died 1882).
- 3 June – Robert Warren, lawyer and politician (died 1897).
- 12 July – William Henry Gregory, politician and writer (died 1892).
- 26 August – John Willoughby Crawford, politician and third Lieutenant Governor of Ontario (died 1875 in Canada).
- 19 September – Charles Joseph Alleyn, lawyer and political figure in Quebec (died 1890 in Canada).
- 11 October – Walter Shanly, civil engineer, author, businessman and politician in Canada (died 1899 in Canada).
- 12 November – John T. Mills, lawyer and Supreme Court Justice for the Republic of Texas (died 1871 in the United States).
- 22 November – Sir William Ewart, 1st Baronet, manufacturer and politician (died 1889).
- 7 December – William Keogh, lawyer and politician (died 1878).
- 12 December – Patrick Talbot, British Army officer (died 1898)
  Full date unknown
  - James Anthony Lawson, lawyer (died 1887).
  - Frederick McCoy, palaeontologist and museum administrator in Australia (died 1899 in Australia).
  - Arthur McQuade, farmer and politician in Ontario (died 1884 in Canada).

== Deaths ==
- 23 May – John Prendergast Smyth, 1st Viscount Gort, politician (born 1742).
- 13 June – Richard Lovell Edgeworth, politician, writer and inventor (born 1744).
- 5 September – Charles Osborne, lawyer and politician (born 1759).
- 14 October – John Philpot Curran, orator and wit, lawyer and MP (born 1750).
- 13 November – John Keogh, merchant and political activist (born 1740).

== See also ==
- 1817 in Scotland
- 1817 in Wales
