= 1902 in Ireland =

- Centuries: 18th; 19th; 20th; 21st
- Decades: 1880s; 1890s; 1900s; 1910s; 1920s
- See also: 1902 in the United Kingdom; Other events of 1902; List of years in Ireland

Events in the year 1902 in Ireland.

== Events ==
- 2 January – The South Irish Horse cavalry was formed as the South of Ireland Imperial Yeomanry.
- 7 January – Waterford Corporation passed a motion to confer the freedom of the city on John Redmond.
- 8 January – The Great National Convention took place in the Round Room of the Rotunda Hospital in Dublin. Motions were passed regarding coercion, the Irish language and evicted tenants.
- 2 April – John Redmond was awarded the freedom of the City of Dublin.
- Spring to autumn – The Cork International Exhibition (1902) was held.
- 22 May – The White Star Liner SS Ionic was launched by Harland and Wolff in Belfast.
- 2 June – The centenary of the Congregation of Christian Brothers was celebrated with High Mass in the Holy Name Cathedral, Chicago.
- 22 July – Thomas Croke died at the age of 78 in Thurles. Roman Catholic Archbishop of Cashel since 1875, he was the first patron of the Gaelic Athletic Association and a supporter of the Gaelic League and the Land League.
- August – The first part of the cliff path at The Gobbins, Islandmagee, was opened.
- 26 November – Ireland's Own magazine was launched.
- The Dunraven land conference started.
- The Roman Catholic St Brendan's Cathedral, Loughrea, was completed.

== Arts and literature ==
- 2 April – W. B. Yeats's play Cathleen Ní Houlihan was first performed in Dublin.
- Michael McCarthy's Priests and People in Ireland was published.
- The Irish Literary Theatre project ended.
- Padraic Colum's anti-enlistment play, The Saxon Shillin' , was awarded a prize by Cumann na nGaedheal.
- Percy French wrote the comic song Are Ye Right There Michael?
- Augusta, Lady Gregory, published Cuchulain of Muirthemne, a retelling of Irish mythology in English.
- Walter Osborne painted his last work, Tea in the Garden, in Dublin.

== Sport ==
=== Association football ===
- International
  22 February – Wales 0–3 Ireland (in Cardiff)
  1 March – Ireland 1–5 Scotland (in Belfast)
  22 – March Ireland 0–1 England (in Belfast)
  Irish League
  Winners: Linfield F.C.
  Irish Cup
  Winners: Linfield F.C. 5–0 Distillery F.C.

== Births ==
- 2 January – Dan Keating, Ireland's oldest man and last surviving veteran of the Irish War of Independence (died 2007)
- 13 January – Francis Connell, cricketer (died 1983).
- 20 January – Kevin Barry, Irish Republican Army member (executed for his part in an operation resulting in the deaths of three British soldiers 1920).
- 26 February – Jim Hurley, veteran of the Irish War of Independence, Cork Gaelic footballer and hurler (died 1965).
- 25 April – Cormac Breslin, Fianna Fáil party TD and Ceann Comhairle of Dáil Éireann (died 1978).
- 29 April – Francis Stuart, writer (died 2000).
- 20 July – Jimmy Kennedy, songwriter (died 1984).
- 21 July – William Bernard Barry, politician in the United States (died 1946 in the United States).
- 16 August – Arthur Douglas, cricketer and rugby player (died 1937 in Northern Ireland).
- 4 September – Patrick Lenihan, Fianna Fáil party TD (died 1970).
- 11 September – Frank Ryan, member of the Irish Republican Army, editor of An Phoblacht, leftist activist and leader of Irish volunteers on the Republican side in the Spanish Civil War (died 1944).
- 16 September – James Dillon, former leader of the Fine Gael party, TD and government minister (died 1986).
- 2 October – Alexander Montagu, 10th Duke of Manchester, born Viscount Mandeville, British Royal Navy officer and hereditary peer (died 1977 in England).
- 16 December – Billy King, cricketer (died 1987).
- 29 December – Edward Pakenham, 6th Earl of Longford, politician, dramatist, and poet (died 1961).
- December – Maurice Gerard Moynihan, civil servant and writer (died 1999).
  Full date unknown
  - Thekla Beere, civil servant (died 1991).
  - Frank Carney, playwright and civil servant (died 1978).
  - Maurice Gorham, journalist and broadcasting executive (died 1978).
  - Patrick MacDonogh, poet (died 1961).

== Deaths ==
- 20 January – Aubrey Thomas de Vere, poet and critic (born 1814).
- 12 February – Frederick Hamilton-Temple-Blackwood, 1st Marquess of Dufferin and Ava, politician, diplomat, and traveller (born 1826 in Florence).
- 10 March – C. Y. O'Connor, engineer in Australia (born 1843).
- 21 April – Ethna Carbery, writer and poet (born 1866).
- 29 May – Edward Harrington, Member of Parliament (MP) for West Kerry 1885–1892 (born c.1852)
- 20 July – John William Mackay, businessman in the United States (born 1831).
- 22 July – Thomas Croke, Roman Catholic Archbishop of Cashel and Emly, founder patron of the Gaelic Athletic Association (born 1824).
- 23 December – Lucius Gwynn, cricketer (born 1873).
  Full date unknown
  - John O'Hart, genealogist (born 1824).

== See also ==
- 1902 in Scotland
- 1902 in Wales
