= 1798 in Ireland =

- Centuries: 16th; 17th; 18th; 19th; 20th
- Decades: 1770s; 1780s; 1790s; 1800s; 1810s
- See also: Other events of 1798; List of years in Ireland

Events from the year 1798 in Ireland.

== Incumbent ==
- Monarch: George III

== Events ==
- March
  - Great Britain's Irish militia arrest the leadership of the Society of United Irishmen marking the beginning of the Irish Rebellion of 1798. A number are arrested at the house of Oliver Bond on 12 March.
  - Lord Castlereagh is appointed Acting Chief Secretary for Ireland.
- 30 March – martial law is proclaimed in Ireland.
- Spring – United Irishman and publisher Peter Finnerty is convicted and imprisoned for seditious libel.
- April – the "dragooning of Ulster": Lieutenant-General Lake, Commander-in-Chief, Ireland, issues a proclamation ordering the surrender of all arms by the civil population of Ulster, effectively disarming the United Irishmen.
- 21 April – Patrick (or William) "Staker" Wallace of the United Irishmen is flogged at Ballinvreena for plotting the assassination of Captain Charles Silver Oliver. He is hanged either immediately afterwards or in early July at Kilfinane.
- 19 May – rebel leader Lord Edward FitzGerald is arrested in Dublin, later dying of wounds received.
- 24 May – first clashes of the rebellion against British rule.
  - 2:00AM – Battle of Prosperous: the United Irishmen seize the model cotton manufacturing town of Prosperous, County Kildare, from the British garrison.
  - 2:30AM – Battle of Naas: the United Irishmen are repelled by the British garrison.
  - 7:00–9:00AM – Battle of Kilcullen: the United Irishmen are repelled by the British army; remaining rebels surrender at Knockaulin Hill on 27 May. The British Army in the Midlands withdraws to Naas.

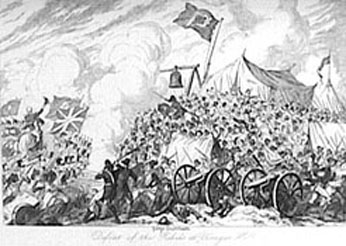
21 June - Defeat of the Rebels at Vinegar Hill

- 25 May
  - Carnew massacre: summary execution of 38 suspected rebels by the British Army in County Wicklow.
  - Massacre of Dunlavin Green: Summary execution of 36 suspected rebels by the British Army in County Wicklow.
- 26 May
  - Wexford Rebellion: United Irishmen mobilise in the north of County Wexford. In the Battle of the Harrow, rebels led by Father John Murphy defeat the Camolin Cavalry.
  - Battle of Tara Hill: British forces drive United Irishmen from their position with around 400 of the latter killed.
- 27 May – Battle of Oulart Hill: Wexford rebels led by Father Murphy again defeat the militia.
- 28 May – Wexford Rebellion: Rebels take Enniscorthy.
- 29 May – Gibbet Rath massacre: Summary execution of 300–500 rebels by the British Army on the Curragh of Kildare.
- 30 May – rebels occupy the town of Wexford.
- May – Blessington House, County Wicklow is burnt to the ground by rebels, and will never be rebuilt.
- 1 June – Republican government set up in County Wexford.
- 4 June – Battle of Tuberneering: United Irishmen led by Father Murphy ambush and defeat British forces in north Wexford.
- 5 June – Battle of New Ross: Wexford rebels are defeated by the British Army.
- 7 June
  - Carnew is burned by rebels led by Anthony Perry.
  - Battle of Antrim: Antrim United Irishmen led by Henry Joy McCracken attack British forces in Antrim town but are defeated.
- 9 June
  - Battle of Arklow: Wexford rebels are defeated by the British Army.
  - Battle of Saintfield: troops of the British Army are ambushed by rebels in Saintfield County Down. The United Irishmen secure a victory.
- 12-13 June – Battle of Ballynahinch: the British Army defeats rebels in County Down. The rebel leader Henry Munro is betrayed and hanged on 16 June in Lisburn.
- 14 June – Charles Cornwallis, 1st Marquess Cornwallis, appointed Lord Lieutenant of Ireland.
- 19 June – Battle of Ovidstown: British forces defeat United Irishmen led by William Aylmer near Kilcock, County Kildare.
- 21 June – Battle of Vinegar Hill fought in and nearby Enniscorthy. The British regain control of County Wexford.
- 22 June – Thomas Judkin-Fitzgerald, High Sheriff of Tipperary, initiates floggings of those in Carrick-on-Suir thought to support the United Irishmen.
- 22 August – a force of French troops led by General Jean Joseph Amable Humbert lands near Killala in County Mayo and Humbert proclaims an Irish Republic.
- 27 August – Battle of Castlebar: A combined force of French and United Irishmen under Humbert defeats the British militia under General Lake in County Mayo. Effective start of the Republic of Connacht.
- 31 August – Humbert proclaims a Republic of Connacht, with John Moore as president.
- 8 September – the French force is defeated by General Cornwallis at the Battle of Ballinamuck in County Longford. End of the Republic of Connacht.
- 16 September – a force of seventy armed United Irishmen led by James Napper Tandy in the French corvette Anacréon makes a brief and fruitless landing on Inishmacadurn in support of the rebellion.
- 23 September – Battle of Killala: in the last land battle of the rebellion, the British army defeats the remaining rebel Irish and French forces at Killala.
- 12 October – Battle of Tory Island: a British Royal Navy squadron under Sir John Borlase Warren prevents French Republican ships landing reinforcements for the United Irishmen on the Donegal coast; Wolfe Tone is captured.

== Arts and literature ==
- Completion of the neoclassical summer retreat at Castle Coole to the design of James Wyatt.

== Births ==
- 15 January – Thomas Crofton Croker, antiquary (died 1854)
- 3 April – John Banim, dramatist and playwright (died 1842).
- 28 May – Alexander Workman, politician in Canada and Mayor of Ottawa (died 1891).
- 11 August – Dominick Daly, Governor of Prince Edward Island, later Governor of South Australia (died 1868).
- 26 August – John McClintock, 1st Baron Rathdonnell, politician and Lord Lieutenant of County Louth (died 1879).
- 1 November – Benjamin Guinness, brewer and philanthropist (died 1868).
- 10 December – George Fletcher Moore, explorer and writer (died 1886).
- 13 December – James Henry, physician, classical scholar and poet (died 1876).
  Full date unknown
  - Biddy Early, née Bridget Connors, traditional healer (died 1874).
  - John St. John Long, quack doctor (died 1834).
  - Alexander McDonnell, chess master (died 1835).
  - Richard Turner, iron-founder (died 1881).

== Deaths ==
- 4 June – Lord Edward FitzGerald, aristocrat and revolutionary (born 1763).
- 17 July – Henry Joy McCracken, cotton manufacturer and industrialist, Presbyterian and a founding member of the Society of the United Irishmen (born 1767).
- 6 September – Walter Patterson, first British colonial Governor of Prince Edward Island (b. c1735).
- 30 September – Molyneux Shuldham, 1st Baron Shuldham, naval officer and colonial governor of Newfoundland (b. c1717).
- 19 November – Theobald Wolfe Tone, leading figure in the United Irishmen, died from self-inflicted wound after being sentenced to death for his part in the Irish Rebellion of 1798 (born 1763).
  Full date unknown
  - Boetius Egan, Roman Catholic Archbishop of Tuam (born 1734).
  - Christopher Hewetson, sculptor (b. c.1737).
  - Bartholomew Teeling, a leader of the Irish forces during the Irish Rebellion of 1798 (born 1774).

== See also ==
- Battles of Irish rebellion 1798
