= 1802 in Ireland =

- Centuries: 17th; 18th; 19th; 20th; 21st
- Decades: 1780s; 1790s; 1800s; 1810s; 1820s
- See also: 1802 in the United Kingdom; Other events of 1802; List of years in Ireland

Events from the year 1802 in Ireland.

== Events ==
- First Christian Brothers' school founded by Edmund Rice in Waterford.
- Cork Fever Hospital and House of Recovery founded by Dr. John Milner Barry in Cork.
- Linen Hall Library moves into permanent premises in the White Linen Hall in Belfast.
- May – Amelia, commanded by William Proby, Lord Proby sails to Cork, Waterford and Dublin to land 150 discharged seaman.
- 2-3 December – 75mm of rain falls in a 30-hour period in Dublin causing serious flooding. Two ships sank at the North Wall, while "all of the major rivers around the city, the Liffey, Poddle and Dodder burst their banks." The stone-built Ormond Bridge (modern day site of O'Donovan Rossa Bridge) was washed away, necessitating a replacement.

== Arts and literature ==
- Henry Boyd completes the first full English translation of Dante's Divine Comedy.
- A collection of Irish language religious verse by Tadhg Gaelach Ó Súilleabháin (died 1795), Timothy O'Sullivan's Pious Miscellany, is published in Clonmel.

== Births ==
- 18 April – Robert Patterson, businessman and naturalist (died 1872).
- 24 May – Robert Baldwin Sullivan, lawyer, judge, and politician in Canada, second Mayor of Toronto (died 1853).
- 12 December – Robert Templeton, naturalist, artist and entomologist (died 1892).
- Juan Galindo, born John Galindo, fighter for Central American independence and explorer (killed in action 1839 in Honduras)

== Deaths ==
- 28 January – Joseph Wall, army officer, colonial governor and murderer (born 1737)
- 2 February – Armar Lowry-Corry, 1st Earl Belmore, politician and High Sheriff (born 1740).
- 30 March – Aedanus Burke, soldier, judge, and United States Representative from South Carolina (born 1743).
- 20 July – Isaac Barré, soldier and politician (born 1726).
- 24 October – John Ramage, artist (born 1748).

== See also ==
- 1802 in Scotland
- 1802 in Wales
