= 1733 in Ireland =

- Centuries: 16th; 17th; 18th; 19th; 20th
- Decades: 1710s; 1720s; 1730s; 1740s; 1750s
- See also: Other events of 1733; List of years in Ireland

Events from the year 1733 in Ireland.

== Incumbent ==
- Monarch: George II

== Events ==
- January – influenza epidemic.
- 25 June – Ben and Samuel Burton's Dublin bank failure.
- 2 July – completion of Dr Steevens' Hospital in Dublin.
- 24 October – Incorporated Society in Dublin for Promoting English Protestant Schools is established to open Irish Charter Schools.

== Arts and literature ==
- Samuel Madden publishes Memoirs of the Twentieth Century.

== Births ==
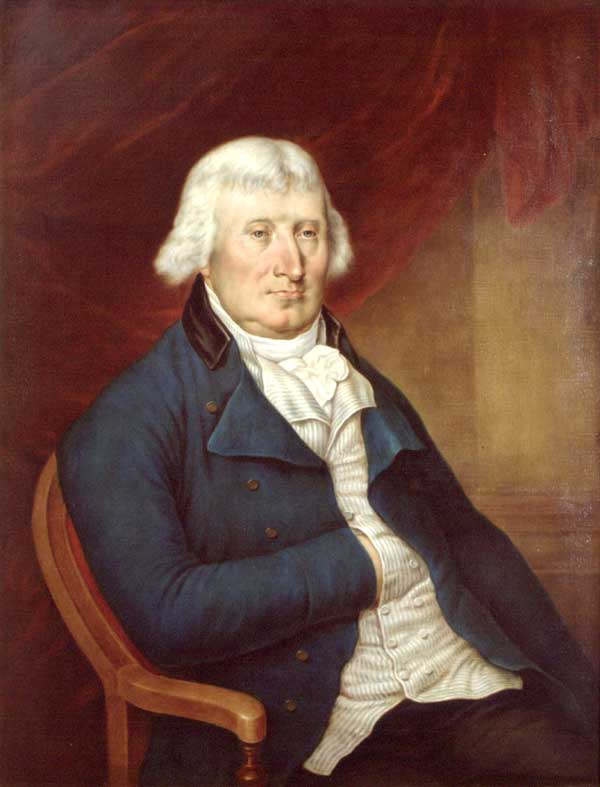
Peter Russell

- 11 June – Peter Russell, gambler, government official, politician and judge in Upper Canada (d. 1808)
- 1 August – Richard Kirwan, scientist (d. 1812)
- Full date unknown
  - Patrick (or William) "Staker" Wallace, a leader of the United Irishmen (d. 1798)

== Deaths ==
- February – Séamas Dall Mac Cuarta, poet (b. c.1647?)
- 7 December – Edward Lovett Pearce, architect (b. 1699)
