= 1803 in Ireland =

- Centuries: 17th; 18th; 19th; 20th; 21st
- Decades: 1780s; 1790s; 1800s; 1810s; 1820s
- See also: 1803 in the United Kingdom; Other events of 1803; List of years in Ireland

Events from the year 1803 in Ireland.

== Events ==
- 23 July – Emmet's insurrection: United Irishman Robert Emmet stages a rising in Dublin which is quelled by the military, with approximately fifty rebels and twenty soldiers dead. The Lord Chief Justice of Ireland, Lord Kilwarden, is hacked to death. Neither Michael Dwyer (from County Wicklow), nor Thomas Russell (in the North), nor rebels from Kildare, are able to offer support for the rebellion as planned.
- 25 August – Emmet is captured near Harold's Cross.
- 19 September – Emmet, found guilty of high treason at the Sessions House, Dublin, delivers his Speech from the Dock, including the phrase "Let no man write my epitaph."
- 20 September – Emmet is hanged in Thomas Street, Dublin.
- 21 October – Thomas Russell, co-founder of the Society of United Irishmen, is hanged at Downpatrick Gaol.
- December – the Wicklow rebel leader Michael Dwyer capitulates to the government and is held in Kilmainham Gaol.
- The new Bank of Ireland buys the former Irish Parliament House on College Green in Dublin from the Government of the United Kingdom for conversion to its headquarters by Francis Johnston.
- Belvelly Bridge, linking Great Island to the mainland of County Cork, is built.

== Arts and literature ==
- 11 August – child actor Master Betty makes his debut in Belfast, followed on 28 November by Dublin.

== Births ==
- 2 March – Mary Frances Clarke, founder of the Sisters of Charity of the Blessed Virgin Mary (died 1887).
- 3 April – James Gamble, soapmaker (died 1891 in the United States).
- 29 April – Paul Cullen, Cardinal and Catholic Primate of Ireland (died 1878).
- 1 May – James Clarence Mangan, poet (died 1849).
- May – Francis Kelly, surveyor, business agent, farmer, and politician in Canada (died 1879).
- 17 October – William Smith O'Brien, nationalist (died 1864).
- 12 December – Gerald Griffin, novelist, poet and playwright (died 1840).
  Full date unknown
  - John Kinder Labatt, brewer in Canada (died 1866).

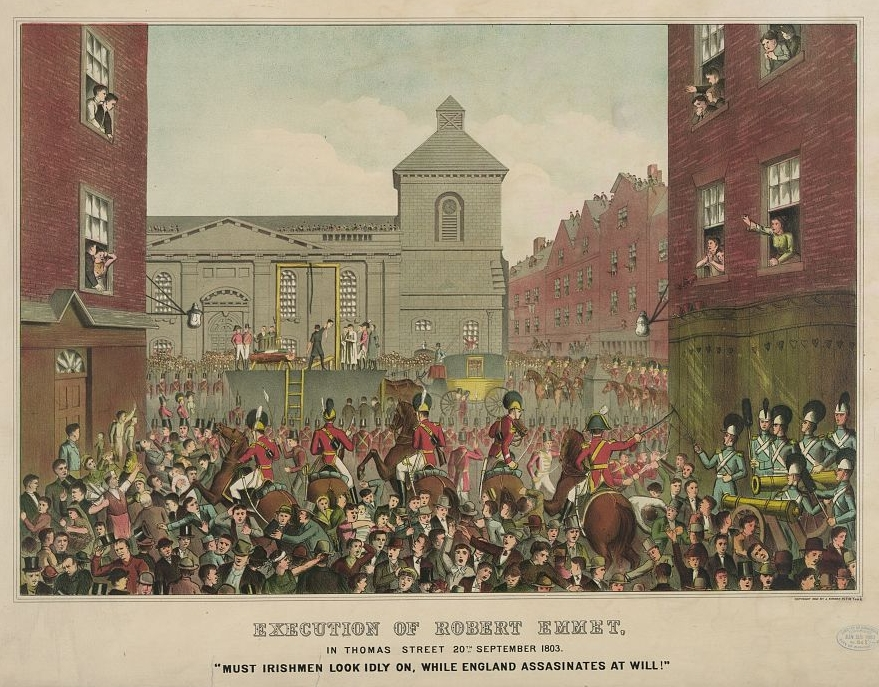
Execution of Robert Emmet

== Deaths ==
- 23 January – Arthur Guinness, brewer and founder of the Guinness Brewery business and family (born 1725).
- 21 February – Colonel Edward Despard, British Army officer and radical (born 1751) (executed).
- 31 May – Robert Jephson, soldier, politician and dramatist (born 1736).
- 11 July – Thomas Hussey, diplomat, chaplain, and Bishop of the Roman Catholic Diocese of Waterford and Lismore (born 1746).
- 23 July – Arthur Wolfe, 1st Viscount Kilwarden, Lord Chief Justice of Ireland (born 1739) (murdered).
- 24 August – James Napper Tandy, rebel leader (born 1740).
- 29 August – Samuel Neilson, co-founder of the Society of United Irishmen and founder of its newspaper, the Northern Star (born 1761).
- 20 September – Robert Emmet, leader of the Society of United Irishmen and instigator of the 1803 rebellion (born 1778) (executed).
- 21 October – Thomas Russell, co-founder of the Society of United Irishmen and rebel leader (born 1767) (executed).

== See also ==
- 1803 in Scotland
- 1803 in Wales
