= 1731 in Ireland =

- Centuries: 16th; 17th; 18th; 19th; 20th
- Decades: 1710s; 1720s; 1730s; 1740s; 1750s
- See also: Other events of 1731; List of years in Ireland

Events from the year 1731 in Ireland.

== Incumbent ==
- Monarch: George II

== Events ==
- June 25 – the Royal Dublin Society is founded by members of the Dublin Philosophical Society, chiefly Thomas Prior and Samuel Madden, as the "Dublin Society for Improving Husbandry, Manufactures and other Useful Arts and Sciences".
- The Parliament of Ireland first meets in the new Irish Houses of Parliament on College Green in Dublin designed by Edward Lovett Pearce.

== Births ==
- January 25 – Robert Harpur, educator and politician in New York (d. 1825)
- May 28 – James Stopford, 2nd Earl of Courtown, politician (d. 1810)
- Robert Barry, lawyer and politician (d. 1793)
- George Bryan, businessman, statesman and politician in Pennsylvania (d. 1791)
- John Butler, 12th Baron Dunboyne, apostate Roman Catholic Bishop of Cork (d. 1800)
- Approximate date – Richard Townsend, politician (d. 1783)

== Deaths ==
- April 15 – Oliver St George, politician (b. 1661)
- June 30 – Francis Bernard, lawyer and politician (b. 1663)
- August 4 – Gabriel O'Kelly, Roman Catholic Bishop of Elphin.
