= 1726 in Ireland =

- Centuries: 16th; 17th; 18th; 19th; 20th
- Decades: 1700s; 1710s; 1720s; 1730s; 1740s
- See also: Other events of 1726; List of years in Ireland

Events from the year 1726 in Ireland.

== Incumbent ==
- Monarch: George I

== Events ==
- October 27 – Rev. Dr. Caleb Threlkeld publishes Synopsis Stirpium Hibernicarum .....Dispositarum sive Commentatio de Plantis Indigenis praesertim Dublinensibus instituta in Dublin, the first flora of Ireland.

== Arts and literature ==
- October 26 – Jonathan Swift's Gulliver's Travels is published in London

== Births ==
Eyre Coote

- April – Thomas Browne, 4th Viscount Kenmare, landowner and politician (d. 1795)
- May 20 – John Browne, 1st Baron Kilmaine, politician (d. 1794)
- October 15 – Isaac Barré, soldier and politician (d. 1802)
- Full date unknown – Dorcas Blackwood, 1st Baroness Dufferin and Claneboye, née Stevenson (d. 1807)
- Approximate date – Eyre Coote, East India Company military officer (d. 1783)

== Deaths ==
- May 20 – Nicholas Brady, Anglican divine and poet (b. 1659)
- Sean na Sagart, né John O'Mullowny, priest hunter and murderer under the penal laws, killed (b. c1690)
- Bryan Townsend, Royal Navy officer and politician (b. c1660)
