= 1799 in Ireland =

- Centuries: 16th; 17th; 18th; 19th; 20th
- Decades: 1770s; 1780s; 1790s; 1800s; 1810s
- See also: Other events of 1799; List of years in Ireland

Events from the year 1799 in Ireland.

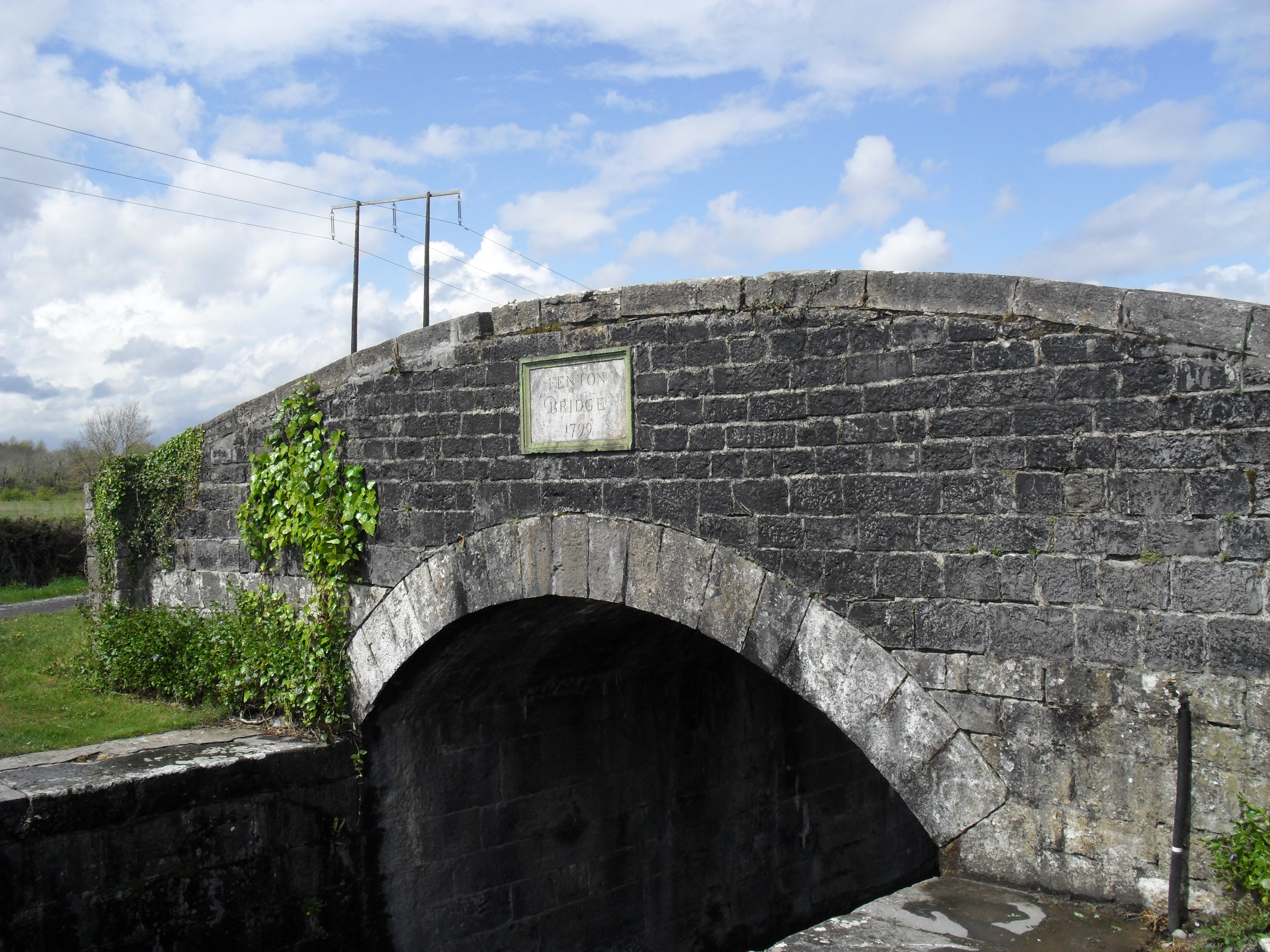
Fenton Bridge over the Grand Canal in Robertstown, County Kildare bears the date 1799.

== Incumbent ==
- Monarch: George III

== Events ==
- 24 January – A motion to debate an Act of Union is defeated in the Irish House of Commons, though it is later approved in the House of Lords
- 9 February – In the worst ever loss-of-life incident on Irish inland waterways (as of 2026), around 91 people die when a barge crashes against a cutwater at Carrick Bridge and capsizes in Carrick-on-Suir.
- 15 February – the rebel guerilla leader Michael Dwyer escapes from a gun battle with British troops at Miley Connell's cottage, Dernamuck, in the Glen of Imaal, County Wicklow. (today called the Dwyer–McAllister Cottage)
- River Shannon made navigable from Limerick to Killaloe.

== Births ==
- 28 February – William Dargan, engineer and railway builder (died 1867).
- 9 August – Henry Maxwell, 7th Baron Farnham, politician and peer (died 1868).
- 12 August – Patrick MacDowell, sculptor (died 1870).
- 22 December – Nicholas Callan, priest and scientist (died 1864).
- 26 December – William Kennedy, Scottish poet, journalist and diplomat (died 1871 in France).
  Full date unknown
  - Henry Archer, barrister and entrepreneur in north Wales (died 1863 in France).
  - Joseph M. Hawkins, Alamo defender (died 1836 in the United States).

== Deaths ==
- 11 January – Thomas Bermingham, 1st Earl of Louth (born 1717)
- 27 February – Sir John Blackwood, 2nd Baronet, politician (born 1722).
- 29 March – Charles Bingham, 1st Earl of Lucan, High Sheriff of Mayo in 1756 (born 1735)
- 4 June – Philip Woodroffe, surgeon
- 4 August – James Caulfeild, 1st Earl of Charlemont, politician, first President of the Royal Irish Academy, president of the volunteer convention in Dublin, 1783 (born 1728).
- 6 December – John Moore, participant in Irish Rebellion of 1798, proclaimed President of the Government of the Province of Connaught (born 1767).
- 11 December – "Brave" Charles Edward Jennings de Kilmaine, soldier in France (born 1751; died in France).
