= 1797 in Ireland =

- Centuries: 16th; 17th; 18th; 19th; 20th
- Decades: 1770s; 1780s; 1790s; 1800s; 1810s
- See also: Other events of 1797; List of years in Ireland

Events from the year 1797 in Ireland.

== Incumbent ==
- Monarch: George III

== Events ==
- May – Henry Grattan retires from the Irish House of Commons.
- Lord Castlereagh is appointed Keeper of the King's Signet for Ireland, a Commissioner of the Treasury for Ireland and a Member of the Privy Council of Ireland.
- Royal Black Institution formed from Orangemen as a Protestant loyalist fraternal society.

== Arts and literature ==
- William Drennan writes the ballad The Wake of William Orr.

== Births ==
- 24 February – Samuel Lover, songwriter, novelist and portrait miniaturist (died 1868).
- 2 June – Joseph Blake, 3rd Baron Wallscourt, socialist (died 1849).
- 20 November – Tyrone Power, actor, comedian, author and theatrical manager (died 1841).
- John Doyle, artist (died 1868).
- Charles C. Ingham, painter and founder of the National Academy of Design in New York City (died 1863).
- Laurence F. Renehan, priest and historian (died 1857).

== Deaths ==
- 9 July – Edmund Burke, statesman, author, orator, political theorist and philosopher (born 1729)
- 11 July – Charles Macklin, actor and dramatist (born 1690).
- 14 October – William Orr, member of the United Irishmen, executed (born 1766).
