= Henry Boyd =

Henry Boyd may refer to:

- Henry Boyd (footballer) (1868–1913), Scottish footballer
- Henry Boyd (academic) (1831–1922), British clergyman and academic administrator at the University of Oxford
- Henry Boyd (translator) (c. 1750–1832), Irish translator of Dante

== See also ==
- Henry Boyd-Carpenter (born 1939), English solicitor
- Harry Boyd
