= 1737 in Ireland =

- Centuries: 16th; 17th; 18th; 19th; 20th
- Decades: 1710s; 1720s; 1730s; 1740s; 1750s
- See also: Other events of 1737; List of years in Ireland

This article lists events from the year 1737 in Ireland.

== Incumbent ==
- Monarch: George II

== Events ==
- April 9 – William Cavendish, 3rd Duke of Devonshire, appointed Lord Lieutenant of Ireland in succession to Lionel Sackville, 1st Duke of Dorset (sworn 7 September).
- August 29 – proclamation reducing the ratio of gold to silver in coins of Ireland to conform with the British standard.
- September 1 – The News Letter is first published in Belfast by Francis Joy, making it the world's oldest existing English language newspaper.

== Births ==
- April 18 – William Hazlitt, Unitarian minister and writer (d. 1820)
- May 2 – William Petty, 2nd Earl of Shelburne, British Whig statesman, home secretary in 1782 and prime minister 1782–1783 (d. 1805)
- May 14 – George Macartney, 1st Earl Macartney, statesman, colonial administrator and diplomat (d. 1806)
- Christopher Hewetson, sculptor (d. c.1798)
- Joseph Wall, British army officer, colonial governor and murderer (d. 1802)

== Deaths ==
- August 7 – Hugh MacMahon, Roman Catholic Bishop of Clogher, later Archbishop of Armagh (b. 1660)
- November – Sir Gerard Lally, Jacobite and French military officer.
- John Neale, influential Dublin music publisher and musical instrument maker.
