= 1728 in Ireland =

- Centuries: 16th; 17th; 18th; 19th; 20th
- Decades: 1700s; 1710s; 1720s; 1730s; 1740s
- See also: Other events of 1728; List of years in Ireland

Events from the year 1728 in Ireland.

== Incumbent ==
- Monarch: George II

== Events ==
- May 6 – Disenfranchising Act, an Act of the Parliament of Ireland, one of a series of penal laws, prohibiting all Roman Catholics from voting, receives royal assent.

== Arts and literature ==
- Matthew Dubourg becomes Master and Composer of State Music of Dublin.

== Births ==
- August 18 – James Caulfeild, 1st Earl of Charlemont, statesman, first President of the Royal Irish Academy, president of the volunteer convention in Dublin, 1783 (d. 1799)
- November 10 – Oliver Goldsmith, writer, poet and physician (d. 1774)
- Nicholas Sheehy, Roman Catholic priest, opponent of the penal laws (executed 1766)

== Deaths ==
- January 28 – Esther Johnson, friend of Jonathan Swift (b. 1681)
- April 28 – Rev. Caleb Threlkeld, botanist (b. 1676)
