= 1735 in Ireland =

- Centuries: 16th; 17th; 18th; 19th; 20th
- Decades: 1710s; 1720s; 1730s; 1740s; 1750s
- See also: Other events of 1735; List of years in Ireland

Events from the year 1735 in Ireland.

== Incumbent ==
- Monarch: George II

== Events ==
- c. December – Bishop George Berkeley's economic text The Querist begins publication anonymously in Dublin.
- Construction of the Magazine Fort in Phoenix Park, Dublin, begins.
- Thomas Carte's An History of the Life of James, Duke of Ormonde begins publication in London.

== Arts and literature ==
- The first known printed poetry by an Ulster Scots writer (in the Habbie stanza form) is published in a broadsheet in Strabane.

== Births ==
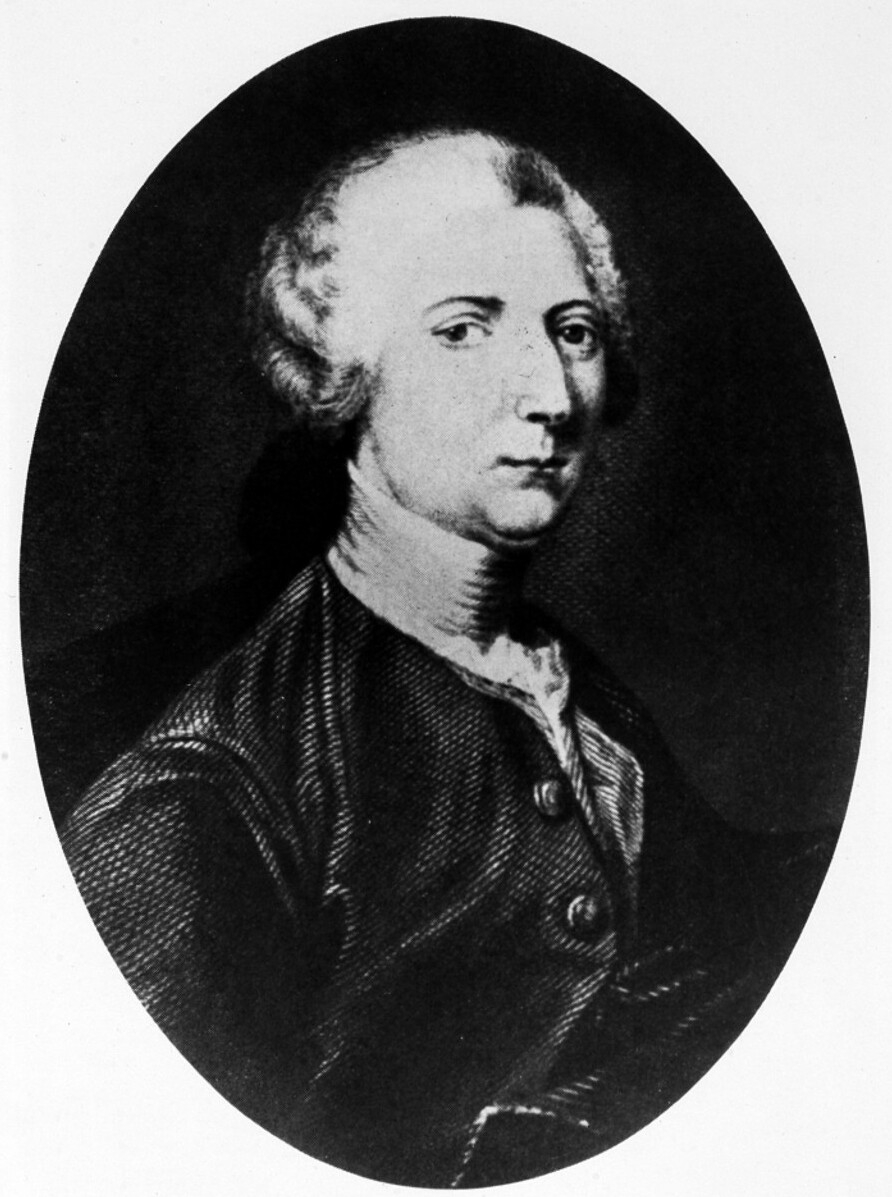
Thomas Conway

- 27 February – Thomas Conway, army officer (d. 1795)
- 19 July – Garret Wesley, 1st Earl of Mornington, politician and composer (d. 1781)
- 22 September – Charles Bingham, 1st Earl of Lucan, politician (d. 1799)
- William Blakeney, British Army officer and politician (d. 1804)
- Thomas Busby, soldier and innkeeper (d. 1798)
- Sir Thomas Butler, 6th Baronet, politician (d. 1772)
- Patrick Duigenan, lawyer and politician (d. 1816)
- John McCausland, politician (d. 1804)
- Edward Dominic O'Brien, British Army officer (d. 1801)

== Deaths ==
- 25 January – Matthew Clerk, Presbyterian minister (b. 1659)
- 26 February – Gustavus Hamilton, politician (b. c.1685)
- 4 March - Mary Mercer (of Mercer's Hospital, Stephen Street, Dublin)
- 4 August – George St George, 1st Baron St George, politician (b. c.1658)
- 27 August – Peter Browne, Church of Ireland Bishop of Cork and Ross and writer (b. c.1665)
