= 1730 in Ireland =

- Centuries: 16th; 17th; 18th; 19th; 20th
- Decades: 1710s; 1720s; 1730s; 1740s; 1750s
- See also: Other events of 1730; List of years in Ireland

Events from the year 1730 in Ireland.

== Incumbent ==
- Monarch: George II

== Events ==
- First bridge across the River Foyle linking Lifford and Strabane is built.
- First turnpike act for Ireland, for improvement of the road from Dublin to Kilcullen Bridge.
- Edward Lovett Pearce succeeds Thomas Burgh as Surveyor General of Ireland.

== Births ==
- James Alexander, 1st Earl of Caledon, merchant, landlord and politician (d. 1802)
- Approximate date
  - Thomas Barton, missionary clergyman (d. 1780)
  - Theophilus Blakeney, politician (d. 1813)

== Deaths ==
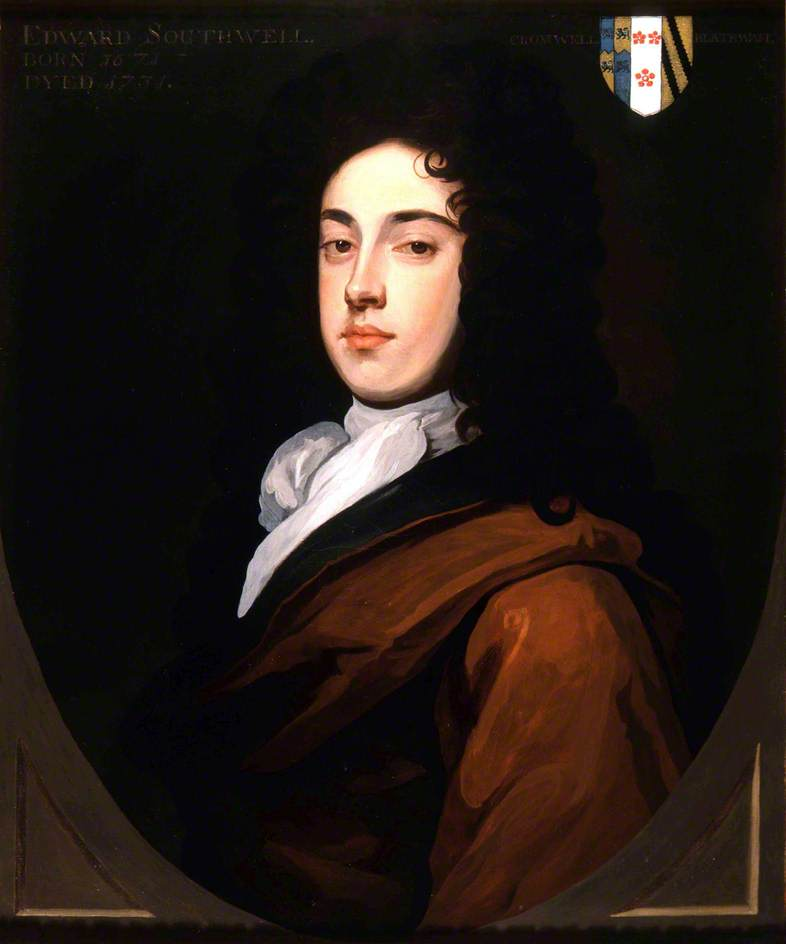
Edward Southwell, Sr.

- January 29 – Thomas Flynn, Roman Catholic Bishop of Ardagh
- August 6 – Sir Thomas Vesey, 1st Baronet, Church of Ireland Bishop of Ossory (b. 1668?)
- October 3 – Thomas Brodrick, politician (b. 1654)
- December 4 – Edward Southwell, politician (b. 1671)
- December 18 – Colonel Thomas Burgh, Surveyor General of Ireland (b. 1670)
