= 1887 in Ireland =

- Centuries: 17th; 18th; 19th; 20th; 21st
- Decades: 1860s; 1870s; 1880s; 1890s; 1900s
- See also: 1887 in the United Kingdom; Other events of 1887; List of years in Ireland

Events from the year 1887 in Ireland.

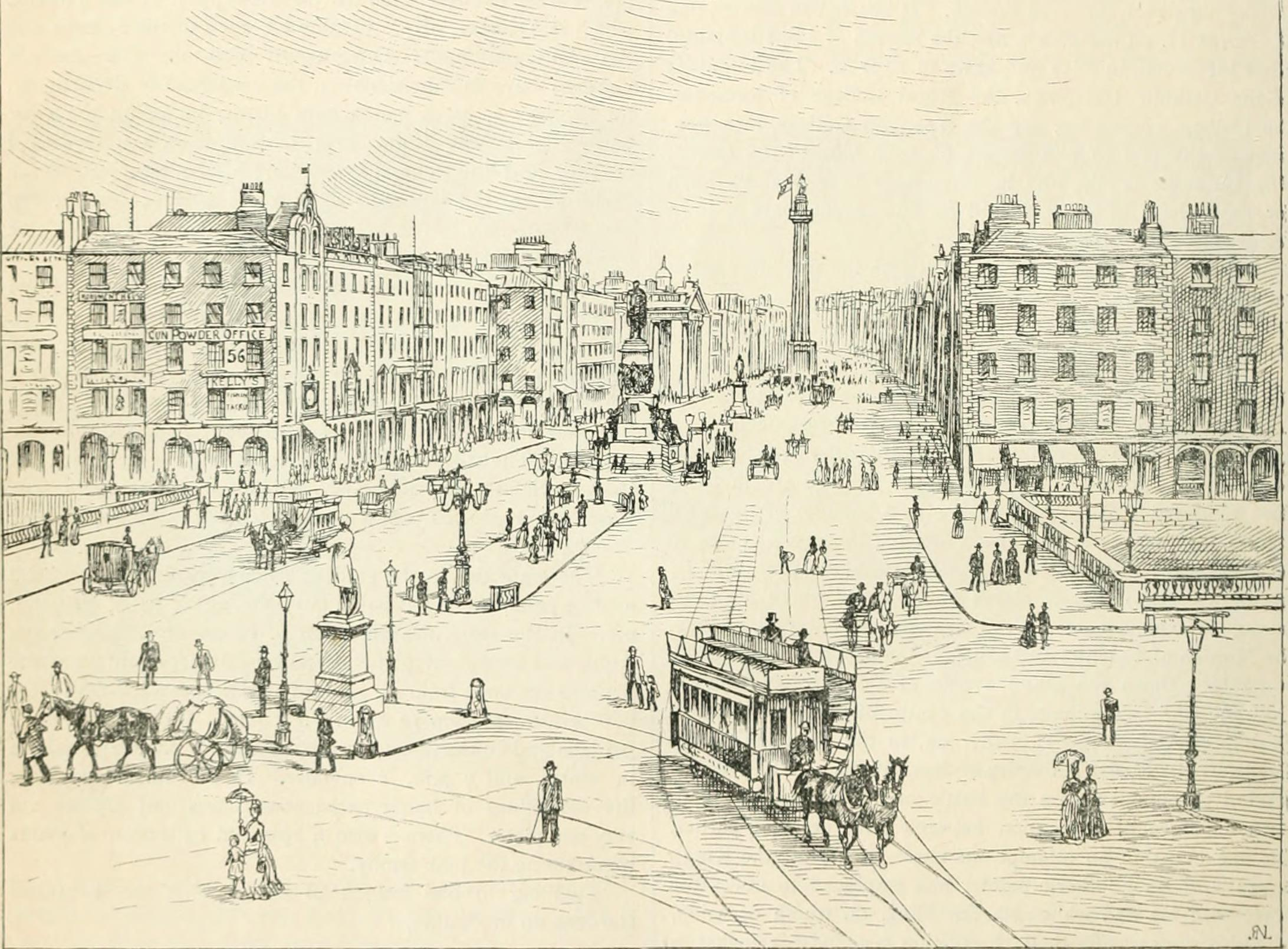
Dublin in 1887

== Events ==
- 29 January – the Dublin newspaper The Union is founded. The Unionist newspaper's goals are stated in its first edition as "A Journal devoted to the maintenance of the Union in the three kingdoms." Richard Moynan begins as a political illustrator with the paper in April.
- 7 March–18 April – The Times (London) publishes a series of articles on "Parnellism and Crime" quoting letters implicating Charles Stewart Parnell of involvement in illegal activities, in particular, support for the 1882 Phoenix Park Murders. A special commission, known as the "Parnell Commission", is proposed to investigate the allegations, as well as investigate links between the Home Rule party and the Fenians, eventually (in 1890) proving the letters forgeries written by Richard Pigott.
- 29 March – the Criminal Law and Procedure (Ireland) Act 1887 is introduced by Arthur Balfour in response to the boycott of certain landlords by their tenants (led by the Irish National Land League), suspending the right to trial of people suspected of involvement in the boycott. The act is passed in September, despite protests from Liberal and Home Rule Members of Parliament, and will continue in force until 1890.
- 19 April – W. E. Gladstone, Leader of the Opposition (United Kingdom), delivers his speech on the 'Irish question'.
- 30 April – Michael Logue translated from Raphoe as coadjutor archbishop of Armagh; on the death of Daniel McGettigan on 3 December he succeeds as Roman Catholic Archbishop of Armagh and Primate of All Ireland, the office which he will hold until his death in 1924.
- 2 May – the narrow gauge Clogher Valley Railway officially opens in County Tyrone.
- 26 June – the highest temperature ever recorded in Ireland, 33.3C (91.9F) at Kilkenny Castle.
- 16 August – opening of an industrial fishing school for boys at Baltimore, County Cork, founded by the parish priest Father Charles Davis and sponsored by English heiress and philanthropist Angela Burdett-Coutts, 1st Baroness Burdett-Coutts.
- 9 September – Mitchelstown Massacre: Three men killed by the Royal Irish Constabulary at a Land League demonstration.
- October – John Boyd Dunlop develops the first practical pneumatic tyre in Belfast.
- 13 November – Bloody Sunday: Police in London clash with radical and Irish nationalist protesters.

=== Full date unknown ===
- Royal Irish Constabulary attack a Land League march in Kiltimagh, County Mayo.
- Arthur Balfour becomes Chief Secretary later enacting the policy of "killing Home Rule with kindness".
- Balfour's Land Law (Ireland) Act 1887, an extension of the Purchase of Land (Ireland) Act 1885, is passed by the Parliament of the United Kingdom.
- The period of rent set by the Land Court is reduced to three years.
- The Plan of Campaign starts its first phase as tenant farmers begin withholding rent from landlords.
- 69,084 emigrate from Ireland to the United States, according to census records.
- Newtownbrowne School is opened in Kiltimagh, County Mayo.
- Construction of Ballymena Castle by Robert Alexander Shafto Adair, the Adair family residence in Demesne, is completed.
- Edward Carson is appointed as counsel to the Attorney-General for Ireland.
- George Roe & Company Distillers becomes the largest distillery in Europe.
- Killiney Hill Park was purchased by the Queen Victoria Memorial Association and opened as a public park by Prince Albert Victor of Wales, in memory of Queen Victoria's Jubilee, and called Victoria Hill.

== Arts and literature ==
- The Romanesque doorway, only surviving portion of the original (late 12th century) Cathedral Church of St. Flannan, Killaloe in County Clare, is restored.
- William Ewart Gladstone publishes Handbook of Home Rule.
- Michael Davitt publishes Revival of the Irish Woollen Industry: Brief Historical Record: How England Endeavoured to Destroy Irish Manufacture: How Irish Leaders Propose to Accomplish its Revival
- William Lecky's A History of Ireland in the Eighteenth Century is published.
- Alex G. Richey's A Short History of the Irish People, Down to the Date of the Plantation of Ulster is published.
- Margaret Stokes publishes Early Christian Art in Ireland.
- Lady Wilde publishes Ancient Legends, Mystic Charms and Superstitions of Ireland, with Sketches of the Irish Past (later appended to The Ancient Race of Ireland)
- Sir Samuel Ferguson's Ogham Inscriptions in Ireland, Wales, and Scotland is published posthumously.
- Charles Villiers Stanford's Third Symphony, in F minor, the Irish, is first performed.

== Sport ==
=== Athletics ===
- January 15 – Trinity College's University Harriers Club holds the first Hares and Hounds race in Dollymount.

=== Football ===
- International
  5 February England 7–0 Ireland (in Sheffield)
  19 February Scotland 4–1 Ireland (in Glasgow)
  13 March Ireland 4–1 Wales (in Belfast). 16th international game and first win.
- Irish Cup
  Winners: Ulster 3–0 Cliftonville
- Athlone Town A.F.C., the oldest surviving club in the League of Ireland, are founded.
- 6 November – Celtic F.C. is formed in Glasgow, Scotland, by Irish Marist Brother Walfrid to help alleviate poverty in the city's East End by raising money for his charity, the Poor Children's Dinner Table.

=== Gaelic Games ===
- Cavan GAA President Michael Davin resigns.
- Cavan GAA football teams Annagh Sons of Usnagh, Mountnugent Red Hands, Belturbet Rory O'Moore's, Mullagh Briffnians, Killinkere Defenders, Cross Independents, Moybulgue St. Patricks, and the Virginia Sarsfields are formed.
- The Kiltimagh Cavan GAA Club is formed.
- The Limerick Commercials win the first All-Ireland Senior Football Championship defeating the Dundalk Young Irelands.
- April 1 – The first All-Ireland Senior Hurling Championship is held in Birr, County Offaly between Galway and Tipperary.
- December 27 – The first Cavan GAA County Convention is held at McGoldricks Hotel in Ballyjamesduff.

== Births ==
- 8 March – Patrick O'Connell, soccer player and manager (died 1959).
- 27 April – Harry Boland, Irish Volunteer in Easter Rising, Sinn Féin MP (shot by members of the Free State National Army 1922).
- 1 May – Alan Cunningham, soldier noted for victories in the East African Campaign during World War II (died 1983).
- 4 May – Ernest Deane, military doctor and Ireland rugby player (killed in action during World War I 1915).
- 6 May – Michael Browne, Master General of the Dominicans, Cardinal (died 1971).
- 7 May – Benjamin Glazer, Academy Award-winning screen writer, producer and director (died 1956).
- 18 May – Richard Wyndham-Quin, 6th Earl of Dunraven, peer (died 1965).
- 24 May – Edward Mannock, First World War flying ace and posthumous recipient of the Victoria Cross (killed in action 1918).
- 19 August – Francis Ledwidge, poet (killed in action during World War I 1917).
- 27 August – Carmel Snow, journalist and editor of the American edition of Harper's Bazaar from 1934 to 1958 (died 1961).
- 8 October – Padraig O'Keeffe, fiddle player (died 1963).
- 13 October – Tommy Henderson, Ulster independent Unionist politician (died 1970).
- 6 November – Edward MacLysaght, genealogist and writer (died 1986).
- 11 November – Canon John M. Hayes, priest and Muintir na Tíre founder.
- 18 November – Joseph Brennan, civil servant and Governor of the Central Bank of Ireland (died 1963).
- 21 November – Joseph Mary Plunkett, nationalist, poet, journalist and a leader of the Easter Rising (executed 1916).
- 21 December – J. J. "Ginger" O'Connell, officer in the Irish Volunteers and Irish Defence Forces (died 1944).

== Deaths ==
- 18 January – Martin Haverty, journalist and historian (born 1809).
- 17 February – William Dowling, soldier, recipient of the Victoria Cross for gallantry in 1857 at Lucknow, India (born 1825).
- 16 April – John McCaul, educator, theologian, and second president of the University of Toronto (born 1807).
- 30 April – Edward Hardman, geologist (born 1845).
- 25 August
  - William Barber, businessman and politician in Ontario (born 1808).
  - Matthew Cooke, economic entomologist in California (born 1829).
- 15 September – Richard Quain, anatomist and surgeon (born 1800).
- 22 November – Ulick Bourke, scholar and writer, founder of the Gaelic Union (born 1829).
- 4 December – Mary Frances Clarke, founder of the Sisters of Charity of the Blessed Virgin Mary (born 1803).
- Full date unknown – Rev. William Anderson O'Connor, theologian.

== See also ==
- 1887 in Scotland
- 1887 in Wales
