= 1738 in Ireland =

- Centuries: 16th; 17th; 18th; 19th; 20th
- Decades: 1710s; 1720s; 1730s; 1740s; 1750s
- See also: Other events of 1738; List of years in Ireland

Events from the year 1738 in Ireland.

== Incumbent ==
- Monarch: George II

== Events ==
- Roxborough Castle in Moy, County Tyrone, built by James Caulfeild, 4th Viscount Charlemont.
- Rev. Samuel Madden publishes Reflections and Resolutions Proper for the Gentlemen of Ireland, as to their Conduct for the Service of their Country, as Landlords, as Masters of Families, as Protestants, as Descended from British Ancestors, as Country Gentlemen and Farmers, as Justices of the Peace, as Merchants, as Members of Parliament.

== Births ==
- 2 December – Richard Montgomery, soldier, major general in the Continental Army during the Revolutionary War (d. 1775)

== Deaths ==
- 25 March – Turlough O'Carolan, blind, itinerant harpist, sometimes styled "The Last of the Bards" (b. 1670)
- 10 October – Thomas Sheridan (b. 1687), an Anglican divine, essayist, playwright, poet, schoolmaster and translator
- Undated
  - Benjamin Hawkshaw, Irish Anglican divine
