= 1729 in Ireland =

- Centuries: 16th; 17th; 18th; 19th; 20th
- Decades: 1700s; 1710s; 1720s; 1730s; 1740s
- See also: Other events of 1729; List of years in Ireland

Events from the year 1729 in Ireland.

== Incumbent ==
- Monarch: George II

== Events ==
- February 3 – the foundation stone is laid for the new Irish Houses of Parliament on College Green in Dublin, designed by Edward Lovett Pearce MP as the world's first purpose-built bicameral legislative building.
- Completion of Castletown House, Celbridge, County Kildare, Ireland's first Palladian mansion, designed by Alessandro Galilei and Edward Lovett Pearce for William Conolly, Speaker of the Irish House of Commons.

== Arts and literature ==
- Jonathan Swift publishes A Modest Proposal.

== Births ==
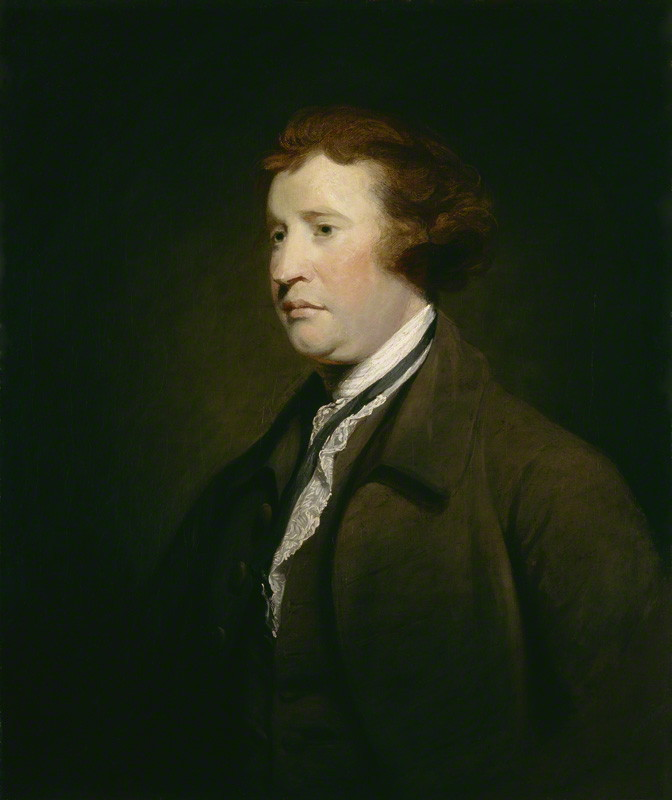
Edmund Burke

- January 12 – Edmund Burke, statesman (d. 1797)
- September 21 – Philip Embury, Methodist (d. 1775)
- November 10 – Martin Glynn, Catholic priest (executed 1794)
- December 8 – James Bernard, politician (d. 1790).
- Hercules Langrishe, politician (d. 1811)
- Henry Mossop, actor (d. 1773?)
- Arthur O'Leary, Franciscan (d. 1802)
- Mary Woffington, Irish socialite (d. 1811)

== Deaths ==
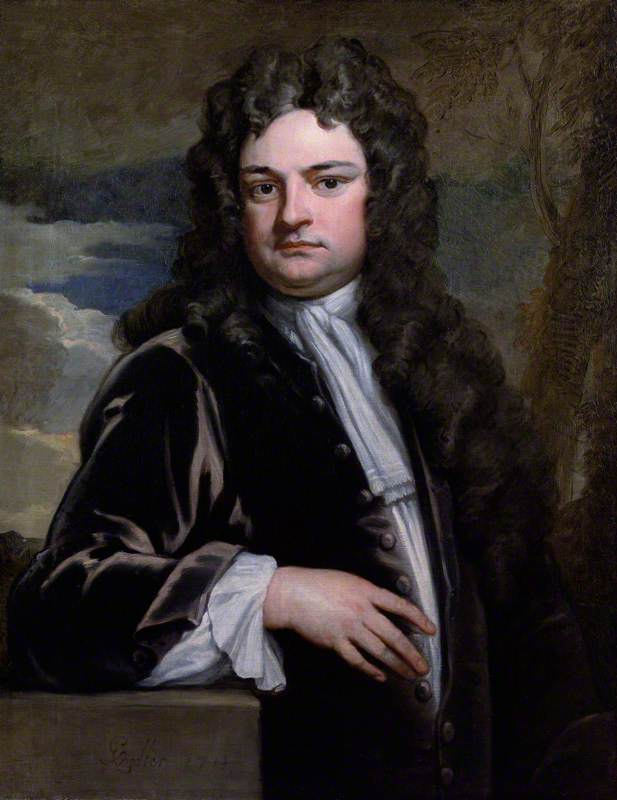
Richard Steele

- March 30 – Jonathan Smedley, Dean of Clogher and Whig satirist (b. 1671)
- May 8 – William King, Church of Ireland Archbishop of Dublin and author (b. 1650)
- September 1 – Richard Steele, writer and politician, co-founder of The Spectator magazine (b. 1672)
  Full date unknown
  - Sir Edward Crofton, 2nd Baronet, of The Mote, landowner and politician (b. c. 1662)
  - Aogán Ó Rathaille, Irish language poet (b. c. 1675)
