= 1886 in Ireland =

- Centuries: 17th; 18th; 19th; 20th; 21st
- Decades: 1860s; 1870s; 1880s; 1890s; 1900s
- See also: 1886 in the United Kingdom; Other events of 1886; List of years in Ireland

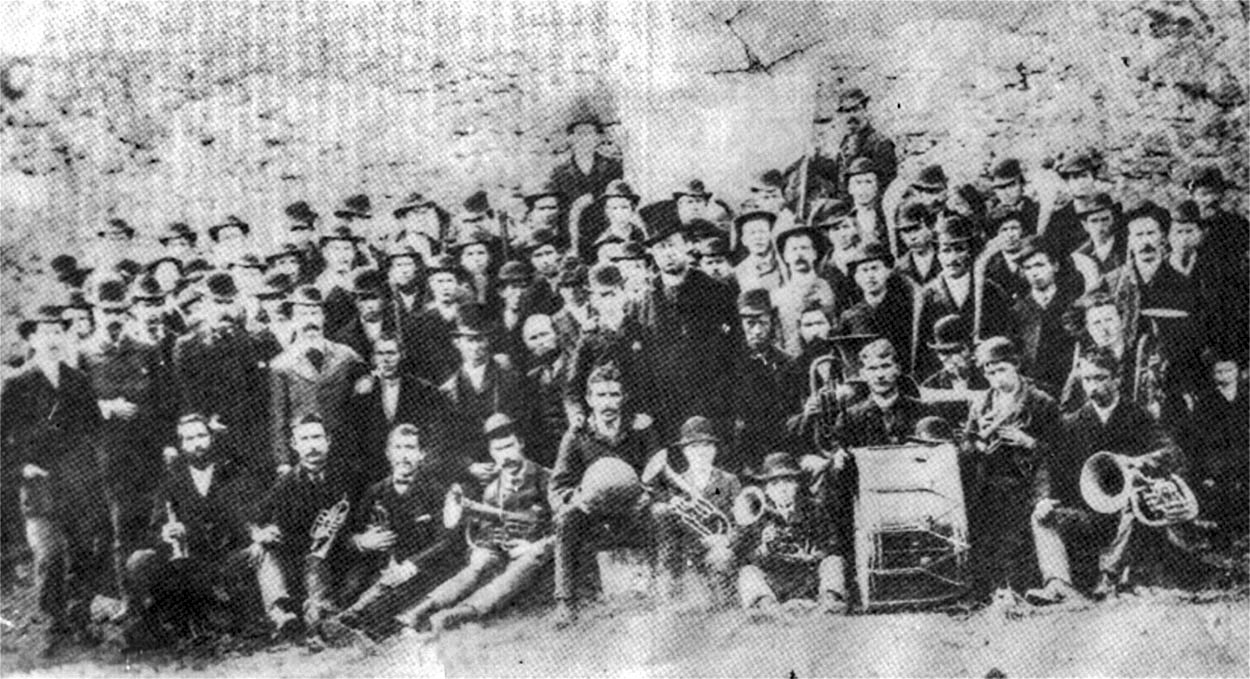
St mary athenry football team and band, 1886

Events from the year 1886 in Ireland.

== Events ==
- January – Ulster Protestant Unionists begin to lobby against the Irish Home Rule Bill, establishing the Ulster Loyal Anti-Repeal Union in Belfast.
- 30 January – SS Fulmar sinks off Kilkee with the loss of all 17 aboard.
- 29 March – Breed standard for Irish Setter agreed.
- March – Prime Minister William Gladstone announces his support for Irish Home Rule.
- 8 April – Gladstone introduces the Irish Home Rule Bill in the House of Commons. During the debates on the Bill
  - Financial Secretary to the Treasury H.H. Fowler states his support for the Bill which in his words would bring about a "real Union—not an act of Parliament Union—but a moral Union, a Union of heart and soul between two Sister Nations".
  - Lord Randolph Churchill voices his opposition with the slogan "Ulster will fight, Ulster will be right".
- 8 June – the First Home Rule Bill fails to pass the British Parliament on a vote of 343–313.
- June – Protestants celebrate the defeat of the Home Rule Bill, leading to renewed rioting on the streets of Belfast and the deaths of seven people, with many more injured.
- 12 June – in a statement to Parliament, Gladstone calls for a general election and, with the dissolution of Parliament, an official election is held the next month.
- 12 July – mid-September: Belfast riots begin with the Orange Institution parades and continue sporadically throughout the summer; clashes take place between Catholics and Protestants, and also between Loyalists and police. Thirteen people are killed in a weekend of serious rioting, with an official death toll of 31 people over the period.
- October – the first tenant farmers are evicted during the first year of the Plan of Campaign.
- 15 October – the SS Great Eastern begins a 5-month period on display at the North Wall Quay, Dublin.
- 30 November – Maud Gonne's father dies leaving her a substantial inheritance ensuring her financial independence.
- St Mary's Pro-Cathedral in Dublin is officially elevated to Pro-cathedral status.
- Eason & Son, booksellers and stationers, established in Dublin.
- The 1886 Tramways Act allows the Board of Works to grant loans to railway companies including £54,400 to the West Clare Railway one of the first railways to be built in western Ireland.
- Charles Cunningham Boycott, who supposedly gave rise to the eponymous word, leaves his land agent's post in Ireland.
- J. M. Synge joins the Dublin Naturalist's Field Club.

== Arts and literature ==
- 17 January – the Anglo-Irish writers cousins Somerville and Ross first meet, at Castletownshend.
- December – W. B. Yeats poem The Stolen Child is published.
- Yeats's verse play Mosada
- Edward Dowden's The Life of Percy Bysshe Shelley is published.
- George Moore's Confessions of a Young Man and A Drama in Muslin are published.
- Emily Lawless's Hurrish is published.
- T. P. O'Connor's The Parnell Movement is published.
- Dublin University professor G.T. Stokes' Ireland and the Celtic Church is published.
- Rev. J. A. Wylie's History of the Scottish Nation, a valuable resource of Celtic Ireland, begins publication.
- Dublin Lodge of the Theosophical Society is founded.

== Sport ==
=== Athletics ===
- December – the Dublin University Harriers Club is founded in an effort to promote cross country running.

=== Chess ===
- March 18 – the Irish Chess Association is invited to a match against the Belfast Chess Club in an advertisement in the Belfast Newsletter and Northern Whig.
- September 20 – October 1: the Irish Chess Association holds a national tournament, consisting of an even and handicap tournament, as Richard Barnett (although W.K. Pollock gained a full score) defeats British Chessmasters John Blackburne and Amos Burn filling the vacancy by former champion Porterfield Rynd.

=== Football ===
- March – Linfield F.C. is formed in Belfast.
  International
  27 February Wales 5–0 Ireland (in Wrexham)
  12 March Ireland 1–6 England (in Belfast)
  20 March Ireland 2–7 Scotland (in Belfast)
  Irish Cup
  Winners: Distillery 1–0 Limavady Alexander

=== Gaelic Games ===
- The first Gaelic Athletic Association match in the United States is held between Kerry and Galway in Boston, Massachusetts.

=== Polo ===
- Polo player John Watson wins the Irish Dublin Cup.
- The British polo team, including two players from the All Ireland Polo Club, win the American International Polo Cup.

== Births ==
- 9 February – Edwin Maxwell, actor (died 1948).
- 21 March – Oscar Traynor, Fianna Fáil politician (died 1963).
- 25 March – Jack McAuliffe, boxer (died 1937).
- 3 April – David Nelson, soldier, recipient of the Victoria Cross for gallantry in 1914 at Néry, France (died 1918).
- 14 April – Jack Beattie, politician and trade unionist (died 1960).
- 4 May – George Ivatt, railway locomotive designer (died 1976)
- 10 May – Richard Mulcahy, Chief of Staff, TD, Cabinet Minister and leader of Fine Gael (died 1971).
- 5 June – Alexander McCabe, Sinn Féin MP, member of First Dáil, Cumann na nGaedheal TD (died 1972).
- 24 June – George Shiels, dramatist (died 1949).
- 13 July – Edward J. Flanagan, popularly known as Father Flanagan, founder of Boys Town in Nebraska (died 1948).
- 28 August – Pat Hone, cricketer (died 1976).
- 4 September – Alice Milligan, nationalist poet and author (died 1953).
- 4 October – Lennox Robinson, dramatist, poet and theatre director and producer (died 1958).
- 10 October – Louis Meldon, cricketer (died 1956).
- 15 November – Séamus Dwyer, Sinn Féin politician (shot 1922).
- 25 November – Frank MacDermot, barrister, soldier, banker and politician (died 1975).
- 8 December – James Geoghegan, Fianna Fáil TD, Minister for Justice, Attorney General of Ireland and judge of the Supreme Court (died 1951).
- 12 December – Owen Moore, actor (died 1939).
- Full date unknown – W. F. McCoy, Ulster Unionist member of the Parliament of Northern Ireland (died 1976).

== Deaths ==
- 25 February – Lady Katherine Sophia Kane, botanist (born 1811).
- 12 March – Trevor Chute, British Army officer (born 1816).
- 28 March – Richard Chenevix Trench, Archbishop of Dublin (Church of Ireland) (born 1807).
- 16 April – Andrew Nicholl, painter (born 1804).
- 4 May – James Muspratt, chemical manufacturer in Britain (born 1793).
- 11 June – James Alipius Goold, Roman Catholic Bishop and Archbishop of Melbourne (born 1812).
- 11 June – Thomas Francis Hendricken, first Bishop of Providence, Rhode Island (born 1827).
- 27 July – Eliza Lynch, former First Lady of Paraguay (born 1835).
- 9 August – Samuel Ferguson, poet, barrister, antiquarian, artist and public servant (born 1810).
- 10 October – Joseph M. Scriven, poet and philanthropist (born 1820).
- 10 December – Abraham Dowdney, United States Representative from New York and officer in the Union army in the American Civil War (born 1841).
- 19 December – Robert Spencer Dyer Lyons, physician and politician (born 1826).
- 30 December – George Fletcher Moore, explorer and writer (born 1798).

== See also ==
- 1886 in Scotland
- 1886 in Wales
