= 1800 in Ireland =

- Centuries: 16th; 17th; 18th; 19th; 20th
- Decades: 1780s; 1790s; 1800s; 1810s; 1820s
- See also: Other events of 1800; List of years in Ireland

Events from the year 1800 in Ireland.

== Incumbent ==
- Monarch: George III

== Events ==
- 28 February – United Irishman Roddy McCorley is executed in Toomebridge for his part in the Irish Rebellion of 1798.
- April – United Irish Uprising of Irish soldiers stationed at St. John's, Newfoundland, with the British Army is dispersed.
- 2 July & 1 August – Acts of Union 1800: the linked Union with Ireland Act 1800, an Act of the Parliament of Great Britain, and Act of Union (Ireland) 1800, an Act of the Parliament of Ireland, are passed by the respective legislatures, to unite the Kingdom of Ireland and Kingdom of Great Britain into the United Kingdom of Great Britain and Ireland, with effect from 1 January 1801. The latter Act, drafted at Derrymore House, achieves its majority of 43 in the Irish House of Commons (which will be abolished under the measures) partly through the bribing of former opponents by the award of peerages and honours. Catholic emancipation has been promised as part of the legislation by William Pitt (the British Prime Minister), Lord Cornwallis (Lord Lieutenant of Ireland) and Lord Castlereagh (Chief Secretary of Ireland) but they are forced to drop it by the King leading to their resignations.
- 1 August – foundation stone of the new King's Inns in Dublin laid, James Gandon being commissioned as the architect.
- 12 August – start of construction of the Military Road across the Wicklow Mountains.
- Dr. John Milner Barry introduces vaccination in Cork.

== Arts and literature ==
- Maria Edgeworth's first extended work of fiction, the pioneering historical novel with an Irish setting - Castle Rackrent, is published anonymously in London.

== Births ==
- 6 January – Anna Maria Hall, novelist (died 1881).
- 16 January – Robert Bell, journalist and writer (died 1867).
- 26 February – John Baptist Purcell, Roman Catholic Archbishop of Cincinnati (died 1883 in the United States).
- 17 March – James Patrick Mahon, Irish nationalist politician and international mercenary (died 1891).
- 18 March – Harriet Smithson, actress (died 1854 in France).
- 17 June – William Parsons, 3rd Earl of Rosse, astronomer and builder of the "Leviathan of Parsonstown" (died 1867).
- July – Richard Quain, anatomist and surgeon (died 1887).
- 14 October – John Hogan, sculptor (died 1858).
  Full date unknown
  - George Forrest, recipient of the Victoria Cross for gallantry during the Indian Rebellion of 1857 at Delhi, India (died 1859).
  - Anthony Lefroy, Conservative Party MP for County Longford in the Parliament of the United Kingdom (died 1890).

== Deaths ==
- 28 February – Roddy McCorley, United Irishman and a leader of the Irish Rebellion of 1798 (executed).
- Richard Geoghegan, agriculturalist (born 1717).
- Approximate date – Eibhlín Dubh Ní Chonaill, noblewoman and poet, composer of Caoineadh Airt Uí Laoghaire (born 1743).
