= 1732 in Ireland =

- Centuries: 16th; 17th; 18th; 19th; 20th
- Decades: 1710s; 1720s; 1730s; 1740s; 1750s
- See also: Other events of 1732; List of years in Ireland

Events from the year 1732 in Ireland.

== Incumbent ==
- Monarch: George II

== Events ==
- 8 March – report of a House of Lords committee on the 'state of popery'.
- 10 March – act reduces the interest rate on loans to 6%.
- Conor Begley and Hugh MacCartin's English-Irish dictionary is published in Paris.
- Trinity College Library in Dublin, designed by Thomas Burgh, is completed.

== Births ==
- 15 May – John Blaquiere, 1st Baron de Blaquiere, soldier and politician (d. 1812)
- 25 November – Robert Clements, 1st Earl of Leitrim, politician (d. 1804)
- Full date unknown – Henry Flood, statesman (d. 1791)

== Deaths ==
- 3 July (buried) – Mary Davys, novelist, poet and playwright (b. 1674)
- 7 July – John Sale, lawyer and MP (b. circa 1675)
- 2 December – Constantia Grierson, editor, poet and classical scholar (b. 1705)
