= 1796 in Ireland =

- Centuries: 16th; 17th; 18th; 19th; 20th
- Decades: 1770s; 1780s; 1790s; 1800s; 1810s
- See also: Other events of 1796; List of years in Ireland

Events from the year 1796 in Ireland.

== Incumbent ==
- Monarch: George III

== Events ==
- 1 February – Wolfe Tone arrives in France.
- 12 July – first Orange Institution parades on The Twelfth held to commemorate the Battle of the Boyne (1690) in Portadown, Lurgan and Waringstown.
- 9 August – the convict ship Marquis Cornwallis leaves Cork for Australia.
- 2 December – Two passenger boats, the Camden and the Phelan go into service on the Royal Canal with a fare of 1s-1d (first class cabin) or 6d (second class cabin) from Dublin to Leixlip, a journey of approximately 20km. This contrasts with the stagecoach price at the time, which cost 8s-8d for the same journey.
- 10 December – the convict ship Britannia leaves Cork for Australia.
- 15 December – Expédition d'Irlande: French expedition (43 ships and 14,000 men) sails from Brest.
- 22 December – French fleet, with Wolfe Tone on board, arrives in Bantry Bay, but is unable to land due to contrary winds.
- Insurrection Act and Treason by Women Act passed.
- Yeomanry Corps formed.
- Building of the Four Courts in Dublin is substantially completed under the supervision of James Gandon.
- The still under-construction Royal Canal reaches the town of Kilcock and trade commences between it and Dublin.

== Arts and literature ==
- Edward Bunting's A General Collection of the Ancient Irish Music is published.

== Births ==
- 27 March – Robert James Graves, surgeon (died 1853).
- April – Abraham Brewster, judge and Lord Chancellor of Ireland (died 1874).
- 20 July – Maziere Brady, judge and Lord Chancellor of Ireland (died 1871).
- 16 August – Francis Crozier, British Royal Navy officer and polar explorer (lost after 1848).
- 4 October – Robert King, 4th Earl of Kingston, soldier and politician (died 1867).
- 27 November
  - John MacEnery, priest and pioneer archaeologist (died 1841).
  - Richard Mayne, barrister and joint first Commissioner of Police of the Metropolis, head of the London Metropolitan Police (1829–1868) (died 1868).
- 3 December – Francis Kenrick, headed the Roman Catholic Archdiocese of Philadelphia, then was Archbishop of Baltimore (died 1863).
  Full date unknown
  - Michael Banim, writer (died 1874).
  - James Curley, astronomer (died 1889 in the United States).
  - George Crawford Hyndman, auctioneer and marine biologist (died 1867).
  - Eliza Hamilton Dunlop, poet (died 1880 in Australia).
  - Charles Cromwell Ingham, painter and founder of the New York National Academy of Design (died 1863 in the United States).
  - John Pitt Kennedy, British military engineer, agricultural reformer and civil servant (died 1879).
  - James McLevy, detective in Edinburgh (died 1875 in Scotland).
  - George Maguire, Mayor of St. Louis, Missouri (died 1882 in the United States).
  - Jones Quain, anatomist (died 1865).
  - Michael Joseph Quin, author, journalist and editor (died 1843).

== Deaths ==
- 23 May – John Roberts, architect. (born 1712/14)
- William Henn, judge (born c.1720).
- Bowen Southwell, landowner and politician (born 1713).
