= 1734 in Ireland =

- Centuries: 16th; 17th; 18th; 19th; 20th
- Decades: 1710s; 1720s; 1730s; 1740s; 1750s
- See also: Other events of 1734; List of years in Ireland

Events from the year 1734 in Ireland.

== Incumbent ==
- Monarch: George II

== Events ==
- 29 April
  - Act prohibits converts from Roman Catholicism to the Church of Ireland from educating their children in the old religion or from becoming Justices of Peace.
  - Act for relief of creditors of failed banks.
- 19 May – George Berkeley is consecrated as Church of Ireland Bishop of Cloyne.
- 17 August – Mercer's Hospital for the sick and poor in Dublin is founded under a bequest of Mary Mercer.

== Arts and literature ==
- March – upper gallery of the Smock Alley Theatre in Dublin collapses for the third time.
- November – George Faulkner begins publication of an edition of Jonathan Swift's Works in Dublin with a corrected text.

== Births ==
- 25 July – Arthur Gore, 2nd Earl of Arran, politician (d. 1809)
- Boetius Egan, Roman Catholic Archbishop of Tuam (d. 1798)

== Deaths ==
- 28 September – James Hamilton, 6th Earl of Abercorn (b. c.1661)
- Richard Cantillon, economic theorist (b. 1680)
