= 1736 in Ireland =

- Centuries: 16th; 17th; 18th; 19th; 20th
- Decades: 1710s; 1720s; 1730s; 1740s; 1750s
- See also: Other events of 1736; List of years in Ireland

Events from the year 1736 in Ireland.

== Incumbent ==
- Monarch: George II

== Events ==
- March 17 – act of the Parliament of Ireland for rebuilding Saint Finbar's Cathedral and erecting a workhouse in Cork.
- March 18 – the House of Commons of Ireland passes resolutions condemning the tithe of agistment on pasturage for dry and barren cattle.
- April 17 – Lionel Sackville, 1st Duke of Dorset, Lord Lieutenant of Ireland, lays the foundation stone for an obelisk commemorating the Battle of the Boyne (1690) at Oldbridge, County Meath.
- June – publication in London of S–t contra omnes: an Irish miscellany containing the first printing of Jonathan Swift's satire on the Parliament of Ireland, "A character, panegyric, and description of the Legion Club".
- June 19 – Charles Cobbe, at this time Church of Ireland Bishop of Kildare, purchases the Newbridge Estate in County Kildare.
- July 27 – riots in east London protesting at Irish immigrants to England providing cheap labour.
- October 6 – James Hamilton begins publication of the Dublin Daily Advertiser.
- James Gallagher, Roman Catholic Bishop of Raphoe, publishes Sixteen Irish Sermons, in an easy and familiar stile, on useful and necessary subjects, in English characters, as being the more familiar to the generality of our Irish clergy in Dublin.

== Arts and literature ==
- Paul becomes the first of the Swiss Lafranchini brothers to come to Ireland where he produces rococo stucco work for the architect Richard Cassels.

== Births ==
- October – Boyle Roche, politician (d. 1807)
- John Alexander, nonconformist minister and writer (d. 1765)
- Robert Jephson, soldier, politician and dramatist (d. 1803)

== Deaths ==
- March 10 – William Cosby, British royal governor of New York (b. 1690)
