= 1727 in Ireland =

- Centuries: 16th; 17th; 18th; 19th; 20th
- Decades: 1700s; 1710s; 1720s; 1730s; 1740s
- See also: Other events of 1727; List of years in Ireland

Events from the year 1727 in Ireland.

== Incumbent ==
- Monarch: George I (until 11 June), then George II

== Events ==
- June 11 – George II becomes King of Great Britain and Ireland upon the death of George I.
- The Irish are permitted to trade in Youghal as corn is scarce; there are riots against its export to other parts.
- St. James's Hospital, Dublin, opens.
- Jonathan Swift's A Short View of the State of Ireland is written.

== Births ==
- April 23 – George Anne Bellamy, actress (d. 1788)
- December 27 – Arthur Murphy, editor and writer (d. 1805)

== Deaths ==
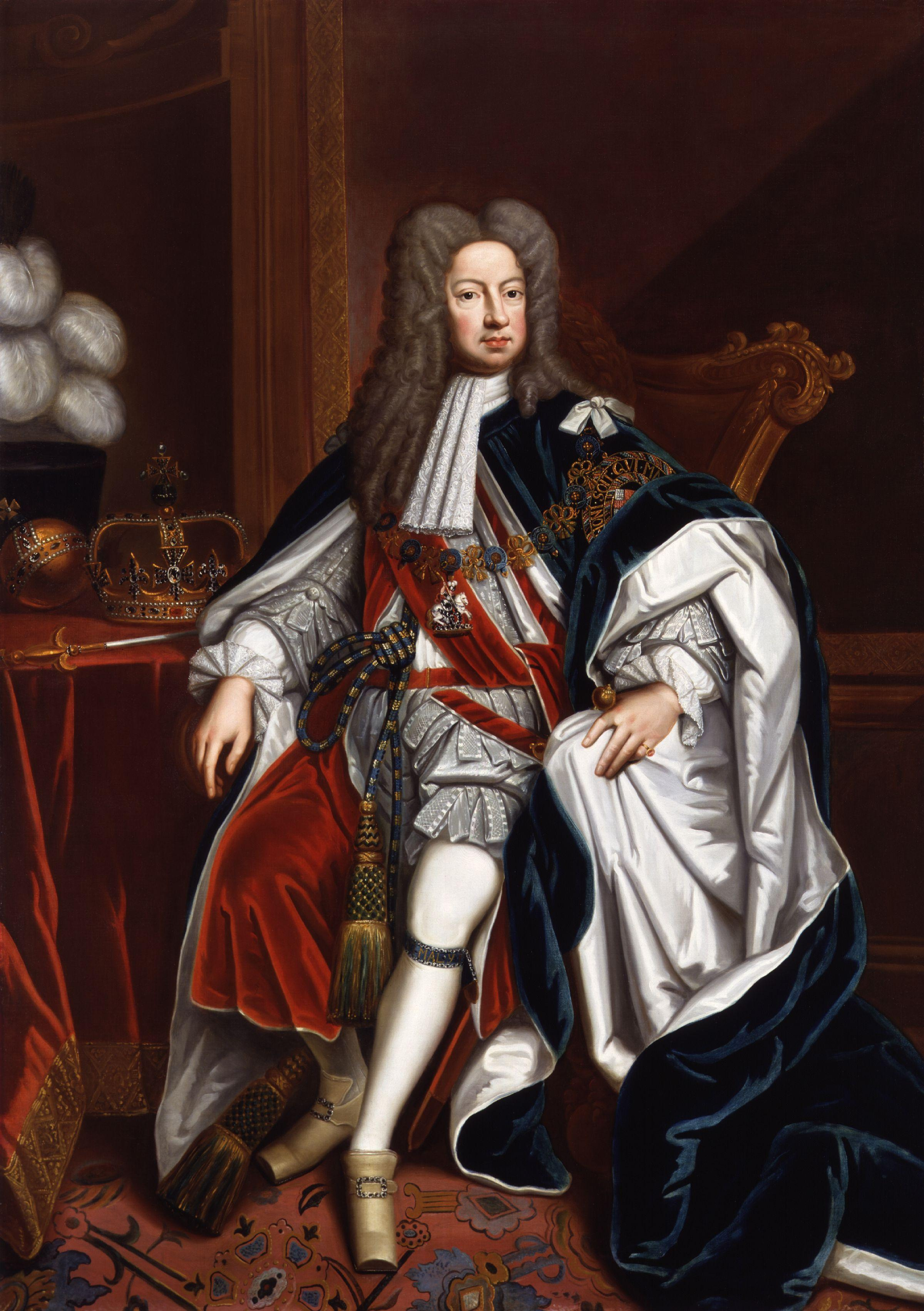
George I of Great Britain

- June 11 – George I of Great Britain (b. 1660)
