= 1795 in Ireland =

- Centuries: 16th; 17th; 18th; 19th; 20th
- Decades: 1770s; 1780s; 1790s; 1800s; 1810s
- See also: Other events of 1795; List of years in Ireland

Events from the year 1795 in Ireland.

== Incumbent ==
- Monarch: George III

== Events ==
- 5 June – the Royal College of St Patrick established at Maynooth by Act of Grattan's Parliament to provide university-level education for Roman Catholic ecclesiastical and lay students.
- 15 September – a group of workers felling timber on the estate of Lord Carysfort in County Wicklow discover gold, leading to the Wicklow gold rush.
- 21 September
  - Battle of the Diamond, a violent confrontation between the Catholic Defenders and Protestants including Peep o' Day Boys, Orange Boys and local tenant farmers, takes place near Loughgall, County Armagh.
  - The Loyal Orange Institution (Orange Order) is formed in County Armagh following the Battle of the Diamond.
- William Pitt, Prime Minister of Great Britain, replaces the popular and liberal Lord Lieutenant of Ireland, Lord Fitzwilliam, with Earl Camden, an opponent of Catholic emancipation whose arrival in Dublin is greeted with riots.
- Society of the United Irishmen members including Theobald Wolfe Tone and Henry Joy McCracken meet at Cavehill to the north of Belfast.
- The town of Louisburgh, County Mayo, is established by Lord Altamount of Westport to house Catholic refugees fleeing sectarian conflict in the north of Ireland.
- The first Wexford bridge across the River Slaney in the town of Wexford, built by the American Lemuel Cox in wood, is completed.
- National Botanic Gardens opened by the Royal Dublin Society.

== Arts and literature ==
- William Drennan writes the ballad Erin.

== Births ==
- 5 May – James Haughton, social reformer and temperance activist (died 1873).
- 20 May – Francis Murphy, first Roman Catholic bishop of Adelaide, South Australia (died 1858).
- 18 July – Hugh Boyd M‘Neile, Anglican churchman (died 1879).
- 16 November – Lord Kingsborough, antiquarian (died 1837).
- Full date unknown – George Darley, poet, novelist and critic (died 1846).

== Deaths ==
- 14 February – Thomas Taylour, 1st Earl of Bective, peer (born 1724).
- March – Thomas Conway, soldier (born 1735), in England.
- 22 April – Tadhg Gaelach Ó Súilleabháin, poet (born 1715).
- 11 September – Thomas Browne, 4th Viscount Kenmare, landowner and politician (born 1726).
