= Battle of the Harrow =

Battle in the 1798 Irish Rebellion

- Part of the United Irishmen Rebellion
Date	26 May 1798
Location	County Wexford
Result	United Irishmen victory

Belligerents
United Irishmen	Ireland

Commanders and leaders
John Murphy	Lieutenant Bookey

Strength
c. 40	c. 20

Casualties and losses
None	2 killed

The Battle of the Harrow took place on 26 May 1798 and was the first clash of the Irish Rebellion of 1798 in County Wexford. It was fought between government forces (specifically a unit of Wexford yeoman cavalry, the Camolin Cavalry) and United Irishmen insurgents under the leadership of a local priest, John Murphy who had mobilized following reports of atrocities by the yeomanry during the rebellion led by the United Irishmen revolutionary organisation.

== Background ==
News of the outbreak of the rebellion to the north had filtered down to County Wexford and was accompanied by the arrival of two military regiments notorious for their brutality: the Royal North Cork Militia and a Welsh fencible cavalry unit known as the Ancient Britons. In addition, regular yeomanry patrols of the countryside and reports of a massacre of prisoners by yeomen in Carnew added to the atmosphere of widespread fear. As a consequence, many people banded together to watch for military patrols or abandoned their homes to hide in the countryside.

One such group, numbering about forty, were gathered by Father John Murphy near the village of The Harrow on the evening of 26 May. Ostensibly the men had come to cut turf for Father Murphy, their local curate, which was a custom at the time. This ruse allowed the men to carry turf cutters, which could serve as rudimentary weapons, but they also had a small number of firearms concealed nearby.

== The Fight at The Harrow ==
Meanwhile, a patrol of about twenty yeomen (belonging to the Camolin Cavalry) were approaching, alerted by the reports of rebellion and seeking a number of suspected United Irishmen. The yeomen initially passed Fr. Murphy's group without incident, but the bulk of the patrol halted nearby while their commanding officer, a Lieutenant Bookey, together with a private, John Donovan, rode on ahead to the dwelling of one of the suspected United Irishmen. Finding their target was not at home, they set fire to the cabin and then turned back to rejoin their unit. The rebels attacked the yeomanry, killing Bookey and Donovan; the remainder of the patrol fled.

The official version of events was recorded in the entry for 26 May 1798 in the Detail Book of the Camolin Cavalry;

"On arrival in Ferns, Lieut. Smith and a party was ordered towards Scarawalsh, where the murders were committed, to see if this information was true, and Lieut. Bookey with another Party rode towards the Harrow, where he met a large party of Insurgents armed with Pikes and some Arms. The Lieut. rode before the Party, and ordered the rebels to surrender, and deliver up their Arms, on which they discharged a volley at the Party, accompanied with a shower of stones, some of which brought Lieut. Bookey from his horse, as also John Donovan, a private in the Corps. The party after firing a few shots, finding themselves overpowered by the Rebels, retreated to Ferns, where they remained ‘till day break, melancholy spectators of the devastation committed by the Rebels. The information of the Murders at Scarawalsh found to be true."

Miles Byrne, one of the leaders of the Rising, has a somewhat different account. He writes in his memoirs:

The Rev. John Murphy, of the parish of Monageer and Boolavogue, was a worthy, simple, pious man, and one of those Roman Catholic priests who used the greatest exertions and exhortations to oblige the people to surrender their pikes and fire-arms of every description. As soon as the cowardly yeomenry thought that all the arms were given up, and that there was no farther risk, they took courage and set out on Whit Saturday, the 26th of May, 1798, burning and destroying all before them. Poor Father John, seeing his chapel and his house and many others of the parish all on fire, and in several of them the inhabitants consumed in the flames, and that no man seen in coloured clothes could escape the fury of the yeomanry, betook himself to the next wood, where he was soon surrounded by the unfortunate people who had escaped... “Well, then,” he replied, “we must when night comes get armed the best way we can, with pitch-forks and other weapons, and attack the Camolin yeoman cavalry on their way back to Earl Mountmorris, where they will return to pass the night after satisfying their savage rage on the defenceless country people.” Father John's plan was soon put into execution; he went to the high road by which the corps was to return, left a few men near a house with instructions to place two cars across the road the moment the last of the cavalry had passed, and at a short distance from thence, half a quarter of a mile, he made a complete barricade across the highway, and then placed all those brave fellows who followed him behind a hedge along the roadside; and in this position he waited to receive the famous yeoman cavalry returning from being glutted with all manner of crimes during this memorable day – the 26th of May, 1798. About nine o’clock at night this corps, riding at great speed, encountered the above-mentioned obstacle on the road, and at were at the same moment attacked from front and rear by Father John and his brave men with their pitch-forks. The cavalry after discharging their pistols got no time to reload them or to make much use of their sabres. In short, they were literally lifted out of their saddles, and fell dead under their horses. Lieutenant Bookey, who had the command in the absence of Earl Mountmorris, was one of the first killed; he was a sanguinary villain, and it seemed a just judgment that befell them all...

== Sources ==
- H. F. B. Wheeler and A. M. Broadley; The War in Wexford: an account of the rebellion in the south of Ireland in 1798, told from original documents (London 1910) pp. 83–4.
