= Kilfinane =

Town in County Limerick, Ireland

Kilfinnane Irish: Cill Fhíonáin
- Town
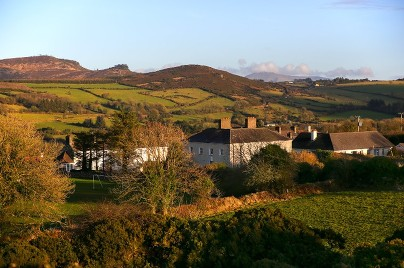
- View from the Moat, Kilfinnane

- Location in Ireland
- Coordinates: 52°21′37″N 8°29′35″W
- Country: Ireland
- Province: Munster
- County: County Limerick
- Elevation: 151 m (495 ft)

Population (2022)
  - Total: 757
- Time zone: UTC+0 (WET)
  - Summer (DST): UTC+1 (IST (WEST))
- Irish Grid Reference: R680230

Kilfinnane or Kilfinane (Irish: Cill Fhíonáin) (/ˌkɪlfɪˈnɑːn/ or /ˌkɪlfɪˈneɪn/, locally /kɪlˈfɪnən/) is a small market town in County Limerick, Ireland. The town's name comes from the Irish Cill (church) and Fhíonáin (Finnian), making its meaning "Church of Saint Finnian". Kilfinnane is located approximately 40 km southeast of Limerick, and approximately 70 km north-northwest of Cork. It had a population of 757 at the 2022 census.

At an elevation of over 150 metres (500 ft), Kilfinnane is the highest town in County Limerick. It is surrounded on three sides by the Ballyhoura Mountains, and on the fourth side is the "Golden Vale" region that runs through Counties Limerick, Cork, and Tipperary.

In 2014, Kilfinnane hosted the inaugural "HearSay International Audio Festival", an event focusing on creative audio. The second HearSay Festival was held in November 2015 had over 80 workshops, installations and performances.

== Education ==
Kilfinnane has primary and secondary schools.

Kilfinnane Primary School Scoil Fhíonáin is located near to the Secondary School and has a new building opened in September 2012. Prior to this, the Primary School was located in an old former Catholic residence, which had reports of infestation, cold conditions and outdoor toilets. In November 2012, disputes amongst building subcontractors and the main building contractor of the new School resulted in builders cutting the power and water, and removing the fittings of the newly opened school building. Parents created a blockade to prevent the builders from leaving the school grounds. The standoff became a national news story. An RTÉ Radio 1 radio documentary "Take No More" by Grey Heron Media on the standoff won Gold at the 2013 PPI Radio Awards, the 2013 Association for International Broadcasting, and the 2013 New York Radio Festival.

Scoil Pól Kilfinnane was founded in 1915 and made its current home in 1987. The school, a Catholic school, offers a range of educational and extra-curricular activities. Some of its activities include sports, cairdeas, transition year activities, green flag and chess.

== Notable people ==
- Patrick Wallace (aka Staker Wallace) (18th century United Irishman)
- Gabriel Rosenstock, Irish writer and poet.
- Peter McDonald, Member of Parliament for North Sligo, 1885 - 1891.
- Sean 'Óg' Hanley who won All Ireland Medals with Limerick, in 1897, and London, in 1901 was a native of Kilfinnane. The 1897 team was spearheaded by Kilfinnane players, who were Co Champions the previous year
- Richie McCarthy, Limerick Hurler and 2013 All-Star
- James Heffernan, member of 24th Seanad Éireann, the upper house of the Oireachtas (legislature) of the Republic of Ireland.
- James Murphy, 19th century judge of the High Court.

== See also ==
- List of towns in the Republic of Ireland
- Market Houses in the Republic of Ireland
