= Camolin Cavalry =

The Camolin Cavalry was a mounted yeomanry unit drawn from the area around the village of Camolin, Wexford, Ireland. It was a part of this unit, commanded by Lieutenant Bookey, which encountered Father John Murphy's small band of rebels at The Battle of the Harrow in the parish of Kilcormick on the evening of 26 May 1798.
