= 1802 in the United Kingdom =

Events from the year 1802 in the United Kingdom.

== Incumbents ==
- Monarch – George III
- Prime Minister – Henry Addington (Tory)
- Foreign Secretary – Lord Hawkesbury
- Secretary of War – Lord Hobart

== Events ==
- 5 January – Thomas Bruce, 7th Earl of Elgin, British ambassador to the Ottoman Empire, begins removal of the Elgin Marbles from the Parthenon in Athens, where they are at risk of destruction during the Ottoman occupation of Greece; the first shipment departs Piraeus on board Elgin's ship, the Mentor, "with many boxes of moulds and sculptures", including three marble torsos from the Parthenon.
- February – The Rosetta Stone is brought to England by Colonel Tomkyns Hilgrove Turner, who arrives at Portsmouth on the captured French frigate L'Egyptiane. On 11 March it is presented to the Society of Antiquaries of London, which in turn presents it to the British Museum.
- 27 March – Treaty of Amiens between France and United Kingdom ends the War of the Second Coalition.
- 19 April – Joseph Grimaldi first presents his white-faced clown character "Joey", at Sadler's Wells Theatre in London.
- May – Marie Tussaud first exhibits her wax sculptures in London, having been commissioned during the Reign of Terror in France to make death masks of the victims.
- 6 May – William Herschel coins the term asteroid and on 1 July first uses the term binary star to refer to a star which revolves around another.
- June – The first account of Thomas Wedgwood's experiments in photography using silver nitrate is published by Humphry Davy in the Journal of the Royal Institution in London. Since a fixative for the image has not yet been devised, the early photographs quickly fade.
- 5 July – André-Jacques Garnerin and Edward Hawke Locker make a 17-mile (27.4-km) balloon flight from Lord's Cricket Ground in St John's Wood, London, to Chingford in just over 15 minutes.
- 5 July – 28 August – General election brings victory for the Tories led by Henry Addington.
- 27 August – West India Docks, first commercial docks in London, open.
- 5 November – Marc Isambard Brunel begins installation of his blockmaking machinery at Portsmouth Block Mills.
- 13 November – The first play to be explicitly called a melodrama ("melodrame") is performed in London, Thomas Holcroft's Gothic A Tale of Mystery (an unacknowledged translation of de Pixerécourt's Cœlina, ou, l'enfant du mystère) at the Theatre Royal, Covent Garden.
- 16 November
  - Arrest in London of ringleaders of the Despard Plot: a failed conspiracy by revolutionaries led by Colonel Edward Despard, a radical Anglo-Irish former British Army officer and colonial official, apparently intended to assassinate King George III and seize key positions such as the Bank of England and Tower of London as a prelude to a wider uprising.
  - The newly elected Parliament is inaugurated by King George III, who tells the members, "In my intercourse with foreign powers, I have been actuated by a sincere disposition of the maintenance of peace," but adds that "My conduct will be invariably regulated by a due consideration of the actual situation of Europe, and by a watchful solicitude for the permanent welfare of my people."
- 23 November – East Indiaman Vryheid, in the service of the Batavian Republic, is shipwrecked in a gale off Hythe, Kent; only 18 of 472 on board survive.
- 2 December – The Health and Morals of Apprentices Act (2 June) comes into effect, regulating conditions for child labour in factories. Although poorly enforced, it pioneers a series of Factory Acts.

=== Ongoing ===
- Anglo-Spanish War, 1796–1808

=== Undated ===
- London Fever Hospital founded.
- Royal Military Academy, Sandhurst, admits its first intake.
- Solomon Hirschell elected rabbi of the Great Synagogue of London, becoming recognised as chief rabbi of the United Kingdom.
- George Bodley of Exeter patents the first enclosed kitchen stove.
- Goodwood Racecourse laid out.

== Publications ==
- 10 October – the reforming quarterly The Edinburgh Review is first published.
- George Montagu's Ornithological Dictionary; or Alphabetical Synopsis of British Birds.
- Walter Scott's collection of Scottish ballads Minstrelsy of the Scottish Border.

== Births ==
- 3 January – Charles Pelham Villiers, politician (died 1898)
- 6 February – Charles Wheatstone, scientist and inventor (died 1875)
- 7 March – Edwin Landseer, animal painter (died 1873)
- 12 June – Harriet Martineau, social theorist and writer (died 1876)
- 10 July – Robert Chambers, Scottish author and publisher (died 1871)
- 28 July – Winthrop Mackworth Praed, poet (died 1839)
- 14 August – Letitia Elizabeth Landon, poet and novelist (died 1838)
- 23 December – Sara Coleridge, scholar (died 1852)
- 10 October – Hugh Miller, Scottish geologist (suicide 1856)

== Deaths ==
- 21 January – John Moore, Scottish-born physician and writer (born 1729)
- 28 January – Joseph Wall, army officer, colonial governor and murderer (born 1737)
- 2 February – Welbore Ellis, 1st Baron Mendip, statesman (born 1713)
- 18 April – Erasmus Darwin, physician and botanist (born 1731)
- 31 October – Sir William Parker, 1st Baronet, of Harburn, admiral (born 1743)
- 9 November – Thomas Girtin, watercolourist (born 1775)
- 15 November – George Romney, portrait painter (born 1734)
- 5 December – Lemuel Francis Abbott, portrait painter (born 1716)
