= 1739 in Ireland =

- Centuries: 16th; 17th; 18th; 19th; 20th
- Decades: 1710s; 1720s; 1730s; 1740s; 1750s
- See also: Other events of 1739; List of years in Ireland

Events from the year 1739 in Ireland.

== Incumbent ==
- Monarch: George II

== Events ==
- 27 April – the trial of Henry Barry, 4th Baron Barry of Santry, before the Irish House of Lords for the drunken murder of a tavern servant in Palmerstown the previous summer opens; he is convicted but later pardoned.
- July–August – wet summer, affecting the harvest and the cutting of turf.
- 26 September – "Address of the Roman Catholics of Ireland" to George II of Great Britain requesting longer leases.
- 6 October – the title Earl of Bessborough is created in the Peerage of Ireland in favour of Brabazon Ponsonby, 2nd Viscount Duncannon, chief commissioner of revenue.
- 27 December–February 1740 – the 'Great Frost': unusually harsh winter in which the River Liffey froze over, and citizens "walked and recreated themselves upon the ice".

== Births ==
- 27 September – Robert Stewart, 1st Marquess of Londonderry, politician (d. 1821)
- 31 October – James Gordon, merchant, soldier, and politician in America (d. 1810)

Full date unknown

- Judge Fulton, judge, surveyor, politician, and founder of the village of Bass River, Nova Scotia (d. 1826)
- Hugh Kelly, dramatist and poet (d. 1777)
- Hugh O'Reilly, Roman Catholic Bishop of Clogher (d. 1801)

== Deaths ==
- Charles Jervas, painter, translator and art collector (b. c.1675)
