= 1793 in Ireland =

- Centuries: 16th; 17th; 18th; 19th; 20th
- Decades: 1770s; 1780s; 1790s; 1800s; 1810s
- See also: Other events of 1793; List of years in Ireland

Events from the year 1793 in Ireland.

== Incumbent ==
- Monarch: George III

== Events ==
- January – delegates of the Catholic Convention, including Wolfe Tone and Christopher Dillon Bellew, present a petition in favour of Catholic emancipation to King George III and the Home Secretary, Henry Dundas, in person and are favourably received.
- April
  - Roman Catholic Relief Act 1793 relieves Catholics of certain political, educational and economic disabilities: they may now vote, enter the legal professions and hold certain public offices. They are also, under the Militia Act (Ireland) 1793 (33 Geo. 3. c. 22 (I)), permitted to bear arms; and both Roman Catholics and Protestant Dissenters are permitted to enter Trinity College Dublin (but the Catholic Church generally dissuades the former from doing so). Any man renting or owning land worth at least forty shillings (the equivalent of two Pounds Sterling), is granted the franchise, creating a class of Forty Shilling Freeholders.
  - Construction commences on the first bridge across the River Suir at Waterford, built by the American Lemuel Cox in wood.

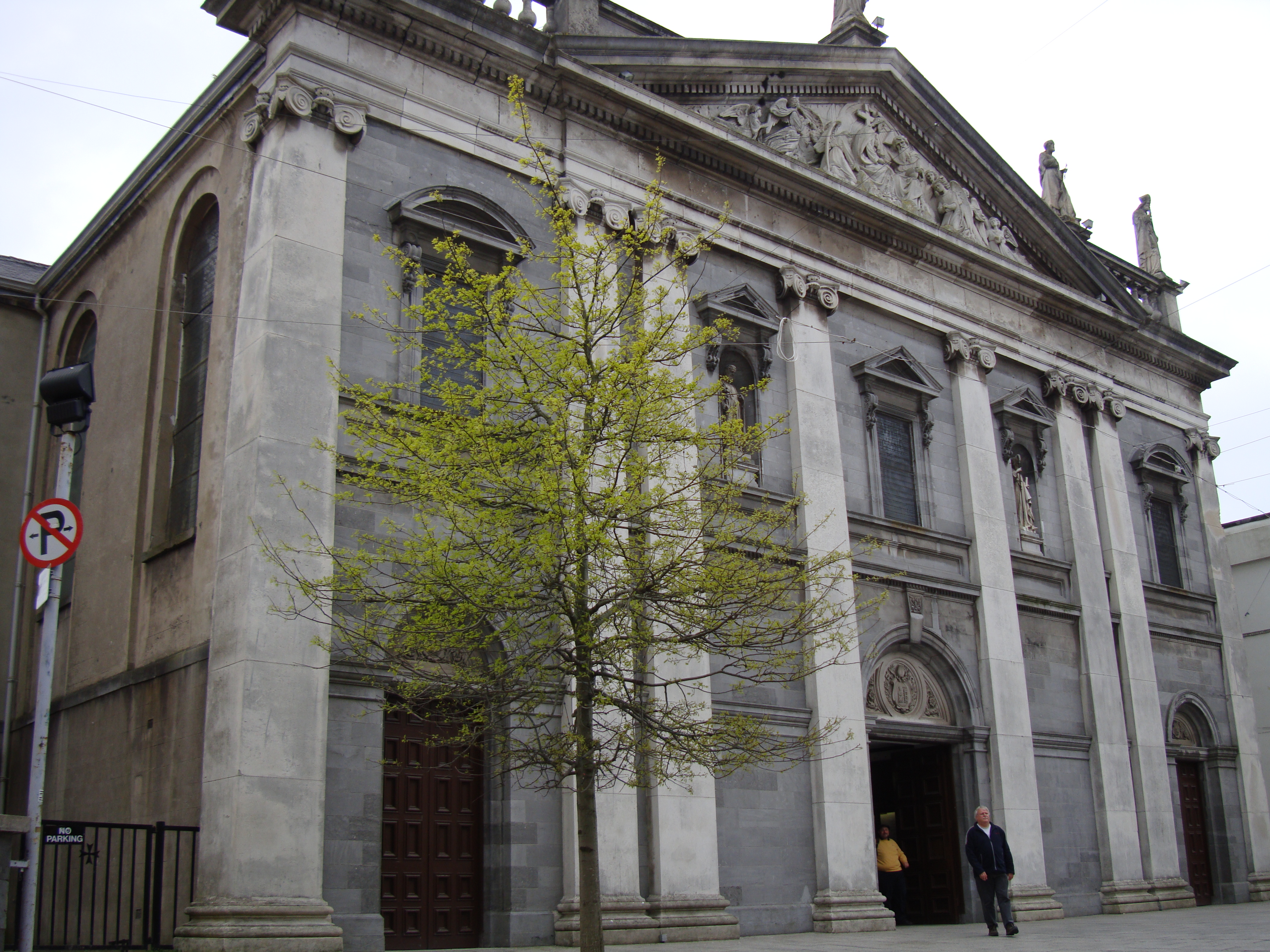
Cathedral of the Most Holy Trinity, Waterford

- Gunpowder Act and Convention Act effectively bring an end to the Irish Volunteers.
- 83rd (County of Dublin) Regiment of Foot raised for service in the French Revolutionary Wars by Colonel William Fitch.
- Cathedral of the Most Holy Trinity, Waterford, the oldest Catholic cathedral in Ireland, is built.
- Ruaidhrí Ó Flaithbheartaigh (Roderic O'Flaherty)'s semi-mythical history of Ireland, Ogygia: seu Rerum Hibernicarum Chronologia & etc. (1685), is for the first time translated into English (by Rev. James Hely) and published as Ogygia, or a Chronological account of Irish Events, collected from Very Ancient Documents faithfully compared with each other & supported by the Genealogical & Chronological Aid of the Sacred and Profane Writings of the Globe.

== Births ==
- 3 April – Dionysius Lardner, scientific writer (died 1859).
- 12 August – James Muspratt, chemical manufacturer in Britain (died 1886).
  Full date unknown
  - Andrew Clarke, soldier, Governor of Western Australia (died 1847).
  - John Benjamin Macneill, railway engineer (died 1880).

== Deaths ==
- Charlotte Brooke, writer (b.c1740).
- Elizabeth Griffith, dramatist, writer and actress (b.c1727).
- Lucy Hartstonge, philanthropist (b.c1722).
