= 1740 in Ireland =

- Centuries: 16th; 17th; 18th; 19th; 20th
- Decades: 1720s; 1730s; 1740s; 1750s; 1760s
- See also: Other events of 1740; List of years in Ireland

Events from the year 1740 in Ireland.

== Incumbent ==
- Monarch: George II

== Events ==
- January–February: the 'Great Frost' continues: unusually harsh winter followed by a Spring drought.
- April – citizens of Drogheda prevent food being exported from their town to Scotland.
- 31 May – 2 June: bread riots in Dublin.
- June–December – exceptionally cold weather, leading to the Great Irish Famine (1740–1741).
- First steam engine installed in Ireland, for pumping at Doonane Colliery, Shrule.
- A Dublin–Belfast stage coach service runs.
- Conolly's Folly in the grounds of Castletown House, County Kildare, commissioned by Katherine Conolly from architect Richard Cassels, is erected to provide employment for hundreds of the poor of Celbridge during the Famine.
- Susanna Drury shows her gouache drawings of the Giant's Causeway at the Dublin Society's first exhibition, bringing the site to wider attention.
- The original Ballymena Castle burns down.

== Births ==
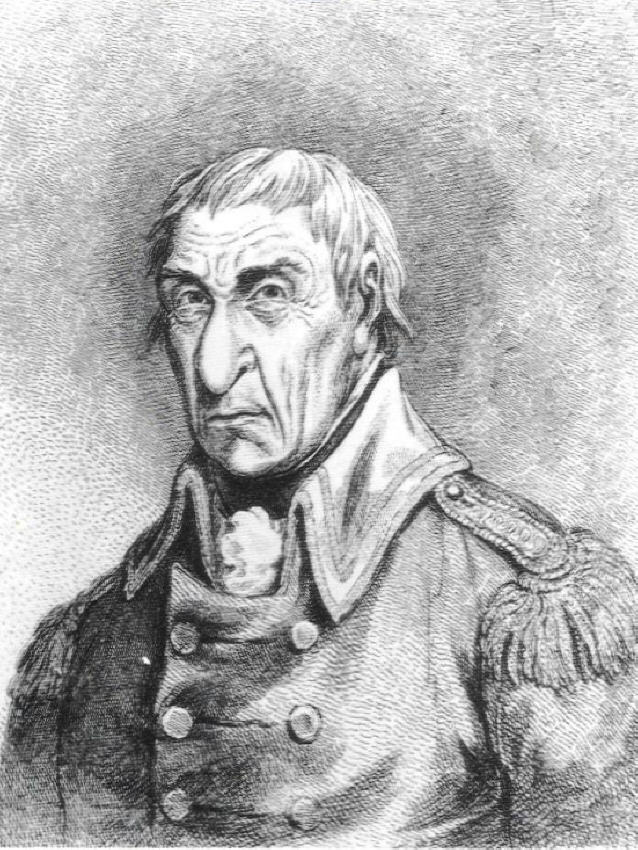
James Napper Tandy

- 7 April – Armar Lowry-Corry, 1st Earl Belmore, politician and High Sheriff (d. 1802)
- 25 September – Hercules Mulligan, tailor and spy during the American Revolution (d. 1825 in New York)
- 22 October – Philip Francis, politician and pamphleteer (d. 1818)
- Full date unknown
  - Richard Barrett, poet and United Irishman (d. 1818)
  - John Foster, 1st Baron Oriel, politician and Irish Chancellor of the Exchequer (d. 1828)
  - Edmund Garvey, painter (d. 1813)
  - Nathaniel Grogan, painter (d. 1807)
  - James Napper Tandy, rebel leader (d. 1803 in Bordeaux)

== Deaths ==
- 13 May – Thomas Milles, Church of Ireland Bishop of Waterford and Lismore since 1708 (b. 1671 in England)
- c. June – Bernard O'Gara, Roman Catholic Archbishop of Tuam
- 1 December – John Abernethy, Presbyterian minister (b. 1680)
