= William Aylmer =

Irish rebel (1778–1820)

William Aylmer (1778–1820) was an Irish military officer and member of United Irishmen who participated in the Irish Rebellion of 1798.

Painting of Aylmer.

On 19 June 1798, Aylmer fought in the Battle of Ovidstown against British Crown forces, which resulted in a defeat for the United Irishmen. Aylmer retreated into the inaccessible Bog of Allen and established a defensive camp, which he maintained for over a month. Eventually, he surrendered to the British in return for a safe conduct abroad; effectively a form of exile. Released from prison in 1802, he went into exile to Austria, where he served as an officer and noted swordsman in the Imperial Austrian Army, from which he was at one point detached to tutor the British Army's dragoons in the art of swordsmanship.

After almost twenty years in Austria, he returned to Ireland, and in 1819 sailed from Dublin to Venezuela with 200 officers and enlisted men to assist Simón Bolívar's independence struggle as commander of the 10th Lancers and second in command of the Irish Legion under Lieutenant-Colonel Francisco Burdett O'Connor. He arrived in September 1819 on the island of Margarita off the coast of Venezuela, where lack of preparations caused severe hardships. Many of the volunteers died or returned to Ireland. He was wounded at the Battle of Rio Hacha on 25 May 1820 and died in Jamaica on 20 June 1820.
