= 1801 in Ireland =

- Centuries: 17th; 18th; 19th; 20th; 21st
- Decades: 1780s; 1790s; 1800s; 1810s; 1820s
- See also: 1801 in the United Kingdom; Other events of 1801; List of years in Ireland

Events from the year 1801 in Ireland.

== Events ==
- 1 January – legislative union of Kingdom of Great Britain and the Kingdom of Ireland completed under the Act of Union 1800, bringing about the United Kingdom of Great Britain and Ireland and abolition of the Parliament of Ireland.
- 3 November – James Murphy succeeds Hugh O'Reilly as Roman Catholic Bishop of Clogher, an office which he will hold until 1824.
- First official, dedicated life-boat in Ireland stationed at Clontarf by the Dublin Ballast Board.
- Joseph Archer's Statistical Survey of the County Dublin is published.

== Births ==
- 22 September – William Hare, 2nd Earl of Listowel, peer and MP (died 1856).
- 23 November – Philip Gore, 4th Earl of Arran, Anglo-Irish peer and diplomat (died 1884).
- 28 December – Armar Lowry-Corry, 3rd Earl Belmore, politician and high sheriff (died 1845).

== Deaths ==
- 3 January – Henry Prittie, 1st Baron Dunalley, politician (born 1743).
- 19 March – Ambrosio O'Higgins, 1st Marquis of Osorno, viceroy of Peru (b. c. 1720).
- 21 March – Philip Nolan, horse-trader and freebooter in Natchez (born 1771).
- 3 September – Hugh O'Reilly, Roman Catholic Bishop of Clogher (born 1739).
- Jean Glover, poet and singer (born 1758 in Scotland).

== See also ==
- 1801 in Scotland
- 1801 in Wales
