= Battle of Ovidstown =

Battle in the 1798 Irish Rebellion

- Part of the Irish Rebellion
| Date | 19 June 1798 |
| Location | near Kilcock, County Kildare |
| Result | Government victory |

Belligerents
| (Kingdom of Great Britain) British Army: (Kingdom of Ireland) Irish loyalists | United Irishmen |

Commanders and leaders
| John Wolfe | William Aylmer |

Strength
| ~400 | ~4,000 |

Casualties and losses
| ~25 killed | ~200 killed |

The battle of Ovidstown was a military engagement between British Crown forces and United Irishmen rebels during the Irish Rebellion of 1798 near the town of Kilcock, County Kildare. Despite the initial failures experienced by the United Irishmen in County Kildare during the first months of the rebellion, the consolidation of government forces in the town of Naas and the priority given by the Dublin Castle administration to suppress the Wexford Rebellion in County Wexford meant that much of the county remained in rebel hands since the outbreak of the rebellion. Towns such as Prosperous and Clane were in rebel hands, while towns such as Maynooth, Kilcock and Kildare had been attacked and briefly occupied by the rebels. By 19 June, however, neighbouring County Meath had been judged sufficiently pacified to allow for government forces to be dispatched from that county into Kildare to recapture rebel-held territory.

A British force commanded by John Wolfe and consisting of roughly 400 troops (consisting of detachments from the 5th Dragoon Guards, a Highland regiment and the yeomanry) and two pieces of artillery were dispatched from Trim on 18 June to locate and defeat a rebel force commanded by William Aylmer. When Aylmer received news of the approaching force, he rallied his men and decided to engage them head on, choosing to make a stand at Ovidstown Hill, which was situated approximately three miles south-west of Kilcock. On the eve before the battle, Aylmer's rebels received word from an unknown source that the door to the wine cellar in a nearby deserted big house, Hortland House, was open. A group of rebels went to the big house, where they looted the cellar and brought all the wine they could carry back to their camp. Many rebels in the camp quickly became drunk after drinking the looted wine, which contributed to their poor performance during the battle.

Almost 4,000 rebels had mustered under Aylmer's command by the time that the approaching British force was spotted, and Aylmer ordered his men to conceal themselves behind ditches on both sides of a local road in an attempt to launch an ambush. However, this attempt failed when a detachment of Highland light infantry attacked both rebel flanks, driving them back and routing them. Despite their initial successes, the British force was unable to organise their cavalry in time to pursue the retreating rebel flanks across the broken terrain; the force was also unable to deploy their artillery in time. Attempting to take advantage of the respite that these events gave him, Aylmer ordered his men to launch a charge before the British could finish deploying their cavalry and artillery. However, the charge eventually petered out due to hesitation among the rebel ranks, and the rebels ultimately merely occupied a position covered by hedges.

This gave the artillery enough time to fire several grapeshot rounds into the massed rebels, who were now forced to abandon their positions and were subsequently exposed to volleys of musket fire from the Highlanders. Forced back onto the offensive, the rebels launched another charge, reaching the British lines and almost capturing the artillery gun, but they had left their left flank unprotected which gave the cavalry the opportunity to launch a counter-attack which routed the rebel attack. Rebel casualties amounted to roughly 200 men killed while the British force suffered approximately 25 troops killed. The dragoons and yeomanry continued to run down the fleeing rebels after the battle, inflicting further casualties on Aylmer's men. A detachment of dragoons under the command of Lieutenant-Colonel Stewart recaptured Prosperous (which had been held by rebels since the Battle of Prosperous) on 19 June. Aylmer relocated his remaining rebels to the Bog of Allen where they linked up with rebels from Wexford led by Anthony Perry.
