= Staker Wallace =

Patrick "Staker" Wallace (1733–1798) was an Irish farmer who was possibly born at Teermore, in Bulgaden-Ballinvana parish of County Limerick, Ireland, near the town of Kilfinane. During the Irish Rebellion of 1798, Wallace was arrested in late March 1798 and charged with being a member of the Society of United Irishmen and plotting the assassination of Captain Charles Silver Oliver, before being executed.

== Name ==
Most commonly known as Staker Wallace or The Staker, his first name was most likely Patrick. His nickname was given to him after his death. Some sources give his first name as William or Edmond (Edmund), but these are less likely than Patrick. In her 1909 book about her ancestor, Eunice Graham Brandt referred to Staker as William. After being beheaded, his head was put on a stake for everyone to see. Thus, Staker Wallace. The monument in his honour in Martinstown, Limerick, refers to him as Edmond. Unfortunately, contemporary news accounts in the Limerick Chronicle are long-lost. Nonetheless, his correct first name can be established from other sources.

According to traditional Irish naming patterns, the first-born son was named after his paternal grandfather. Both of Staker's sons named their first-born sons Patrick. A history of Limerick published in 1866 included a list of sentences passed by the General Court Martial in Limerick on 4 July 1798. Included on the list: "Patrick Wallis, for collecting subscriptions for procuring the assassination of Chas. S. Oliver, Esq., to be hanged at Kilfinane, his head to be affixed on one of his own pikes, and placed on the castle." A document on the United Irishmen in Limerick found in the 1940s in the Irish State Paper Office listed prisoners in the new gaol (jail) in 1798. Ten of those listed had been executed, including a Patrick Wallis. Wallis and Wallace are interchangeable spellings of his surname. Both were used in County Limerick at the time.

== Background ==
Patrick Wallace's extended family had lived in the southeast parishes of County Limerick for generations. He married Hanora Riordan of Glenroe in 1758 and had five children: William, Patrick Jr., Mary, Joan (Jane), and Hanora. Wallace was a small farmer in his 60s when he became involved in revolutionary activities.

== Involvement in 1798 rebellion ==
Wallace was involved in the disturbances leading up to the 1798 rebellion in Ireland, and was hung as a local captain of the United Irishmen. "Staker" Wallace was arrested in late March 1798. He was charged with being a disloyal revolutionary and plotting the assassination of Captain Charles Silver Oliver. On 21 April 1798, Wallace was publicly flogged at a cattle fair at Ballinvreena. One account makes it sound as though he was hanged, drawn and quartered, and finally beheaded immediately afterwards, when the torture failed to yield the desired results. Another source says he was executed in July 1798. He died in the town of Kilfinane. His nickname may derive from the fact that his severed head was placed on a stake to serve as a warning to others, although it more likely preceded his execution and was linked to stakes used to mark commonages. His body was buried at the Abbey burial grounds, Glenroe-Ballyorgan parish, County Limerick.

Wallace may also have been a local leader of a secret Irish agrarian organisation, established in 18th-century Ireland to defend tenant-farmer rights, known as the "Whiteboys".

== Relatives ==
In the 1850s, many of Staker's grandchildren, great-grandchildren, and collateral relatives emigrated to Kane County, Illinois, USA, a rural area west of Chicago. They used the "Wallace" spelling of the name, rather than the "Wallis" spelling which was often, but not exclusively, used in Ireland. Several are buried at St. Mary's Cemetery in Gilberts, Rutland Township, Kane County.

== In culture ==
There is a traditional Irish ballad about Patrick Wallace called "Death of Staker Wallace" or "Lament for Staker Wallace" (title variant: Wallis). Its melody is known but only a few of its lyrics survive. It is an air traditionally associated with the uilleann pipes. A version of the air, played by fiddler Eileen Ivers, appears in the soundtrack of the Martin Scorsese film Gangs of New York (2002). However, "Lament for Staker Wallace" does not appear on the film's original soundtrack CD.

Founded in 1886, the GAA club Staker Wallace, located outside Kilmallock, is named after him.
