= John Moore (Irish politician) =

Appointed governor of Connacht during rebellion of 1798

Citizen John Moore
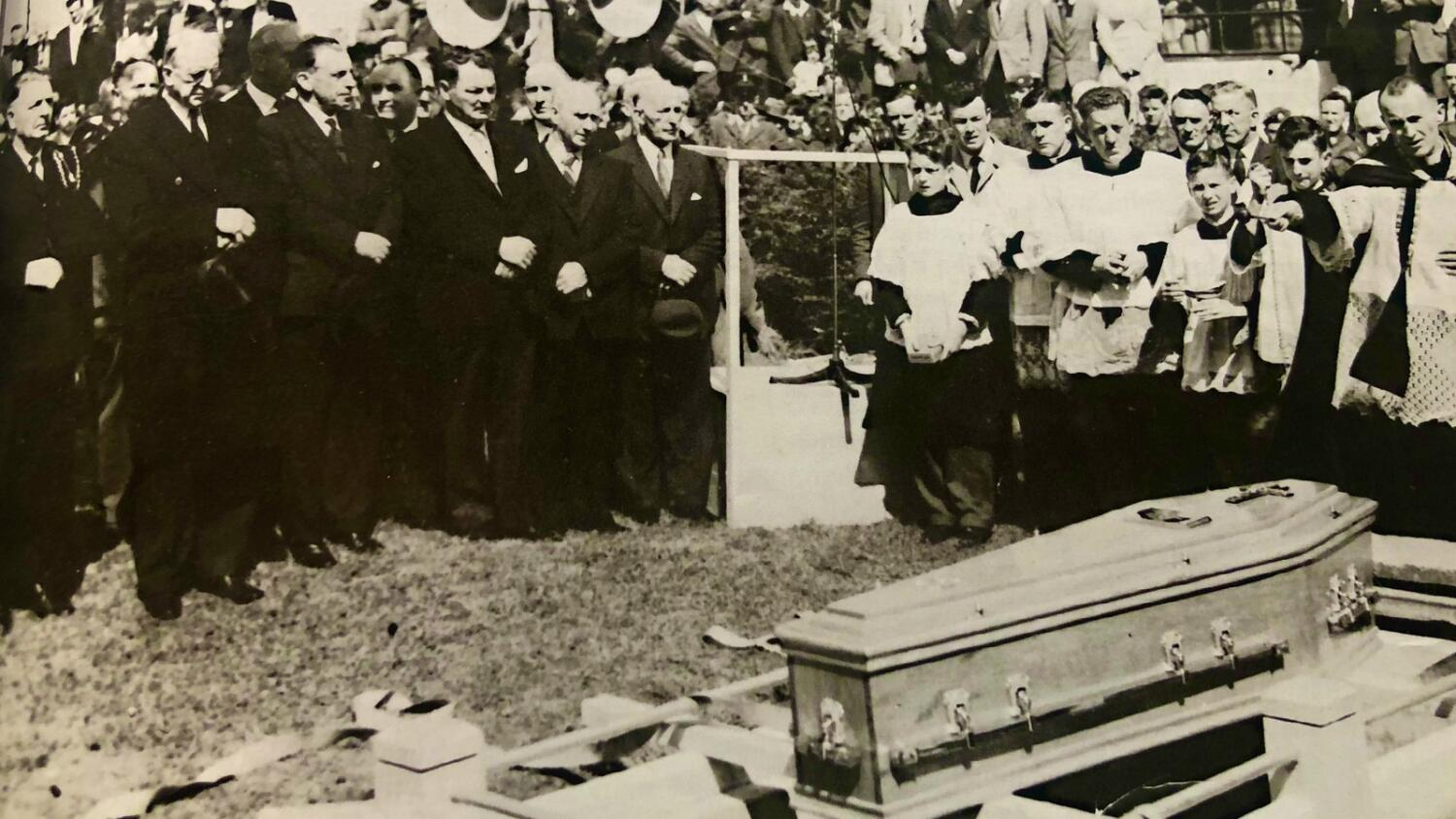
- The remains of John Moore being reinterred at the Mall in Castlebar in 1961

President of the Irish Republic
- In office 1798–1799

Personal details
- Born: 1 January 1763 Ashbrook, near Straide, County Mayo, Ireland
- Died: 6 December 1799 (aged 36) Waterford, Ireland
- Cause of death: "a lingering and obstinate disorder"
- Resting place: Castlebar, County Mayo, Ireland

John Moore (1763 – 6 December 1799) was an Irishman appointed in August 1798 as "President of the Government of the Province of Connacht" by the commander of a French invasion force, General Humbert.

== Early life ==
From Ashbrook, near Straide, County Mayo, John Moore was the son of a prosperous merchant, George Moore. He was educated at the Catholic school of Douai, and at the University of Paris under the assumed name of "Bellew". On his return to Ireland he studied for the bar but seems to have shown little interest in his studies.

== Appointment as president ==
At the time of the Irish Rebellion of 1798 a force of 1,000 French soldiers under General Humbert landed at Killala. Moore joined the French, as did a considerable number of his tenants. After the Battle of Castlebar which took place on 27 August 1798, General Humbert, on 31 August 1798, issued the following decree, which among other things appointed John Moore as the President of the Government of the Province of Connacht:

Army Of Ireland

Liberty, Equality

Head quarters at Castlebar, 14th Fructidor, sixth Year of the French Republic, One and Indivisible.

General Humbert, Commander in Chief of the Army of Ireland, desirous of organising with the least possible delay, an administrative power for the Province of Connacht, decrees as follows:

1. The Government of the Province of Connacht shall reside at Castlebar till further orders.
2. The Government shall be composed of twelve members, who shall be named by the General-in-chief of the French Army.
3. Citizen JOHN MOORE is named President of the Government of the Province of Connacht, he is specially entrusted with the nomination and reunion of the members of the Government.
4. The Government shall occupy itself immediately in organising the Military power of the Province of Connacht, and with providing subsistence for the French and Irish Armies.
5. There shall be organised eight regiments of infantry, each of twelve hundred men, and four regiments of cavalry, each of six hundred men.
6. The Government shall declare rebels and traitors to the country all those who having received clothing and arms, shall not join the army within four and twenty hours.
7. Every individual from sixteen years of age to forty, inclusive, is REQUIRED in the name of the Irish Republic, to betake himself instantly to the French Camp, to march in a mass against the common enemy, the Tyrant of ANGLICIZED IRELAND, whose destruction alone can establish the independence and happiness of ANCIENT HIBERNIA. — General Humbert, Commanding-in-Chief

The above decree refers to an Irish Republic, not a Republic of Connacht. Hence, strictly speaking, it appears to be incorrect to refer to any formal establishment of a Republic of Connacht or of John Moore being appointed its President. Instead, an Irish Republic had been proclaimed, and John Moore was appointed the President of one of its provinces, Connacht.^{a} Nevertheless, as civil or political appointments were not made for any other province of the short-lived 1798 Irish Republic, the Republic of Connacht is the name that has long been commonly used for that Irish Republic. Either way, the new republic was proclaimed by the French to increase their political and logistical support in Ireland.

The general tasks with which Moore was entrusted as President are apparent from the above decree. However, the rebel Republic was a puppet state and was very short-lived (discussed below). The main problem for Moore was that the Irish Roman Catholic Hierarchy was vehemently opposed to French republicanism, whether from the Dechristianization of France during the French Revolution, or the French expulsion of Pope Pius VI earlier in 1798, that resulted in a short-lived "Roman Republic".

Nevertheless, among the things which President Moore did have time to do was to issue "paper money to a considerable extent...[i]n the name of the French Government".

== Capture and trial ==
In September 1798, just weeks after its proclamation, the Irish Royal Army mobilised westwards and the Republic was lost with defeat at the Battle of Ballinamuck. President Moore was captured in Castlebar by a Lieut.-Col. Crawford. From a letter dated 10 December 1798 from Lord Cornwallis to the Duke of Portland, it appears that President Moore was:

"taken a prisoner by His Majesty’s forces at Castlebar where he was found with a commission in his possession from the commander of the French invading army, under which commission he had acted and exercised authority under the enemy, being at war with our Sovereign Lord the King ...[and] he had continued to so act until he was made a prisoner."

Moore's trial was delayed for some time as the British authorities took the view that owing to the general strife in County Mayo and the presence of rebels, there was a significant chance Moore could be rescued by rebels if they tried to bring him to Dublin to stand trial. Owing to the delay in his trial, an attempt was made to force Moore's release under the writ of habeas corpus. However, this was unsuccessful. Moore was subsequently sentenced to transportation. According to contemporary accounts, the "lenity" of Lord Cornwallis to Moore "and other rebels, gave considerable offence to the violent loyalists". While being taken to Duncannon Fort in County Wexford, en route to New Geneva, he died in the Royal Oak Coaching Inn, Broad Street, Waterford City.

== State funeral ==
After he died, Moore was buried in the cemetery of Ballygunner Temple in Waterford. The location of his grave was forgotten until it was rediscovered by chance in 1960. On 12 August 1961, his remains were exhumed and conveyed under Army Guard to Castlebar. On 13 August 1961, after a funeral mass in Castlebar, Moore's remains were reinterred at The Mall in Castlebar at a state military funeral attended by President Éamon de Valera, the Taoiseach, Seán Lemass, several TDs, the ambassadors of Spain and France, and some of John Moore's living descendants.

The inscription over Moore's grave reads:

"Ireland's first president and a descendant of St Thomas More, who gave his life for his country in the rising of 1798 ... By the will of the people exhumed and reinterred here with all honours of church and state."

The claimed ancestral link between John and St Thomas More is unproven.

In 1998, in connection with the bicentenary of the 1798 rebellion, at least one member of Mayo County Council proposed that Moore's remains should be exhumed once again and this time reinterred at Moore Hall, the ancestral home of the Moores. Nothing came of the proposal.

== Notes ==
^a Similarly, Humbert's declaration to the people upon landing in Ireland on 22 August 1798 refers only to an Irish Republic not a Republic of Connacht:- "LIBERTY, EQUALITY, FRATERNITY, UNION, After several unsuccessful attempts, behold at last Frenchmen arrived amongst you... Union, Liberty, the Irish Republic! Such is our shout. Let us march. Our hearts are devoted to you; our glory is in your happiness".
