= John Milner Barry =

Irish medical doctor

John Milner Barry (1768–1822) was an Irish medical doctor.

== Life ==
Barry was the eldest son of James Barry of Kilgobbin near Bandon, County Cork. In 1792 he graduated with an MD from the University of Edinburgh, and practised medicine at Cork until his death. He introduced vaccination into Cork in 1800, and thus was the first to make it known to any Irish city. In 1802 he founded the Cork Fever Hospital and House of Recovery and was its first physician. He held the lectureship on agriculture in the Royal Cork Institution for many years, and resigned the post in 1815. He married Mary, eldest daughter of William Phair of Brooklodge near Cork in 1808, and died in 1822. In 1824 a monument with a long laudatory inscription was erected to his memory in the grounds of the Fever Hospital by his fellow-townsmen. Dr. Barry contributed many papers on vaccination, fever, and similar subjects to the London Medical and Physical Journal, 1800–1 (vols. iii., iv., and vi.); to Dr. Harty's History of the Contagious Fever Epidemics in Ireland in 1817, 1818, and 1819, Dublin, 1820; to Barker and Cheyne's Fever in Ireland, Dublin, 1821; and to the Transactions of the Irish College of Physicians, vol. ii. He also published several pamphlets, and wrote many annual reports of the Cork Fever Hospital. In his essays he forcibly described the physical dangers of drunkenness, and the necessity of coercing habitual drunkards by law. He also strongly advocated the development of female education.

Barry's second son, John O'Brien Milner Barry, (1815–1881), was also a physician. He studied medicine at Paris from 1883 to 1836, and graduated with an MD from the University of Edinburgh in 1837. He practised for some years at Laugharne, at Totnes, and finally, from 1852 till his death in 1881, at Tunbridge. He became a Fellow of the Royal College of Physicians shortly before his death in 1822.
