= Henry Boyd (translator) =

Irish translator

Henry Boyd (c. 1750 – 1832) was an Irish cleric and translator of Dante.

== Life ==
Boyd was most probably educated at Trinity College, Dublin. By 1791 he was seeking subscriptions for his original poems. Anderson, writing to Thomas Percy in 1806, said that he had received some squibs written by Boyd against Mone, and that the humour was coarse.

Boyd died at Ballintemple, near Newry, at an advanced age, 18 September 1832. In the title-pages to two of his works the author is described as vicar of Drumgath in Ireland; but in biographical notices and in the obituary record of the Gentleman's Magazine for September 1832, he is described simply as vicar of Rathfriland and chaplain to the Earl of Charleville.

== Works ==
Boyd published a translation of Dante's 'Inferno' in English verse, the first of its kind, with a specimen of the 'Orlando Furioso' of Ariosto, 1785. It was printed by subscription, and dedicated to the Earl of Bristol, bishop of Derry. The dedication is dated from Killeigh, near Tullamore, of which place presumably Boyd was incumbent. In 1796 he published 'Poems chiefly Dramatic and Lyric,'

In 1802 Boyd issued three volumes of an English verse translation of the whole 'Divina Commedia' of Dante, with preliminary essays, notes, and illustrations, which was dedicated to Viscount Charleville, whose chaplain the author is described to be in the title-page. In the dedication Boyd states that the terrors of the Irish rebellion, had driven him from the post of danger at Lord Charleville's side to seek a safe asylum in a 'remote angle of the province.'

In 1805 Boyd was seeking a publisher for his translation, of the 'Araucana' of Ercilla, a long poem, which 'was too great an undertaking for Edinburgh publishers,' and for which he vainly sought a purchaser in London (ibid. 120, 149). In 1805 he published the 'Penance of Hugo, a Vision,' translated from the Italian of Vincenzo Monti, with two additional cantos; and the 'Woodman's Tale,' a poem after the manner and metre of Spenser's 'Faery Queen.' The latter poem formed really the first of a collection of poems and odes. These poems were to have been published at Edinburgh, and Boyd seems to have acted badly in making an engagement with a London house to publish them after they had been announced there.

In 1807 he issued the 'Triumphs of Petrarch,' translated, into English verse, and in 1809 some notes of his on the Fallen Angela in 'Paradise Lost' were published, with other notes and essays on Milton, under the superintendence of the Rev. Henry John Todd.
