= Caleb Threlkeld =

Irish botanist, dissenting cleric and physician

Caleb Threlkeld (1676–1728) was an Irish botanist, dissenting cleric and physician.

He wrote the first flora of Ireland under the title Synopsis Stirpium Hibernicarum .....Dispositarum sive Commentatio de Plantis Indigenis praesertim Dublinensibus instituta which was published in Dublin in 1726. An appendix was based on botanical notes made by Thomas Molyneux.
