= Joseph Wall (colonial administrator) =

British Army officer and Lieutenant Governor of Gorée

Joseph Wall (1737 – 28 January 1802) was a British Army officer and Lieutenant Governor of Gorée, an island near Dakar, Senegal, who was executed in London for the fatal flogging of one of his soldiers. The former colonial administrator, who had previously been arrested for cruelty, was hanged outside Newgate Prison eight days after a one-day trial at the Old Bailey. Thousands of people came to watch the execution because of the notoriety of the case.

== Early life ==
Wall was born in Dublin, Ireland in 1737, a son of Garrett Wall of Derryknavin, near Abbeyleix in Queen's County, who is described as "a respectable farmer on Lord Knapton's estates". At the age of 15, Joseph Wall was entered at Trinity College, Dublin. However, preferring a career to the life of a student, at the beginning of 1760 he joined the British Army as a cadet. He then volunteered for foreign service.

== Military and overseas service ==
In 1762, Wall distinguished himself at the capture of Havana in Spanish Cuba during the Seven Years' War. By the time of peace in 1763, he had risen to the rank of captain. He obtained an appointment with the East India Company before beginning service in Bombay, India. By 1773, Wall had been appointed secretary and clerk of the council in Senegambia, West Africa. However, he was imprisoned by Lieutenant-governor Matthias MacNamara for the military offence of "cruelty". Later he would launch a civil action for this arrest, obtaining £1,000 in damages.

Upon his release, Wall returned to Ireland "to hunt for an heiress". There he met a lady called Miss Gregory at an inn on his father's estate. However, he pressed his suit "in a style so coercive" that she prosecuted him for assault and defamation and "succeeded in his conviction and penal chastisement". After Wall killed an acquaintance due to "affairs of honour", he moved back to England. In London he spent his time in drinking establishments and gaming parlours, and having amorous encounters.

== Colonial governor ==
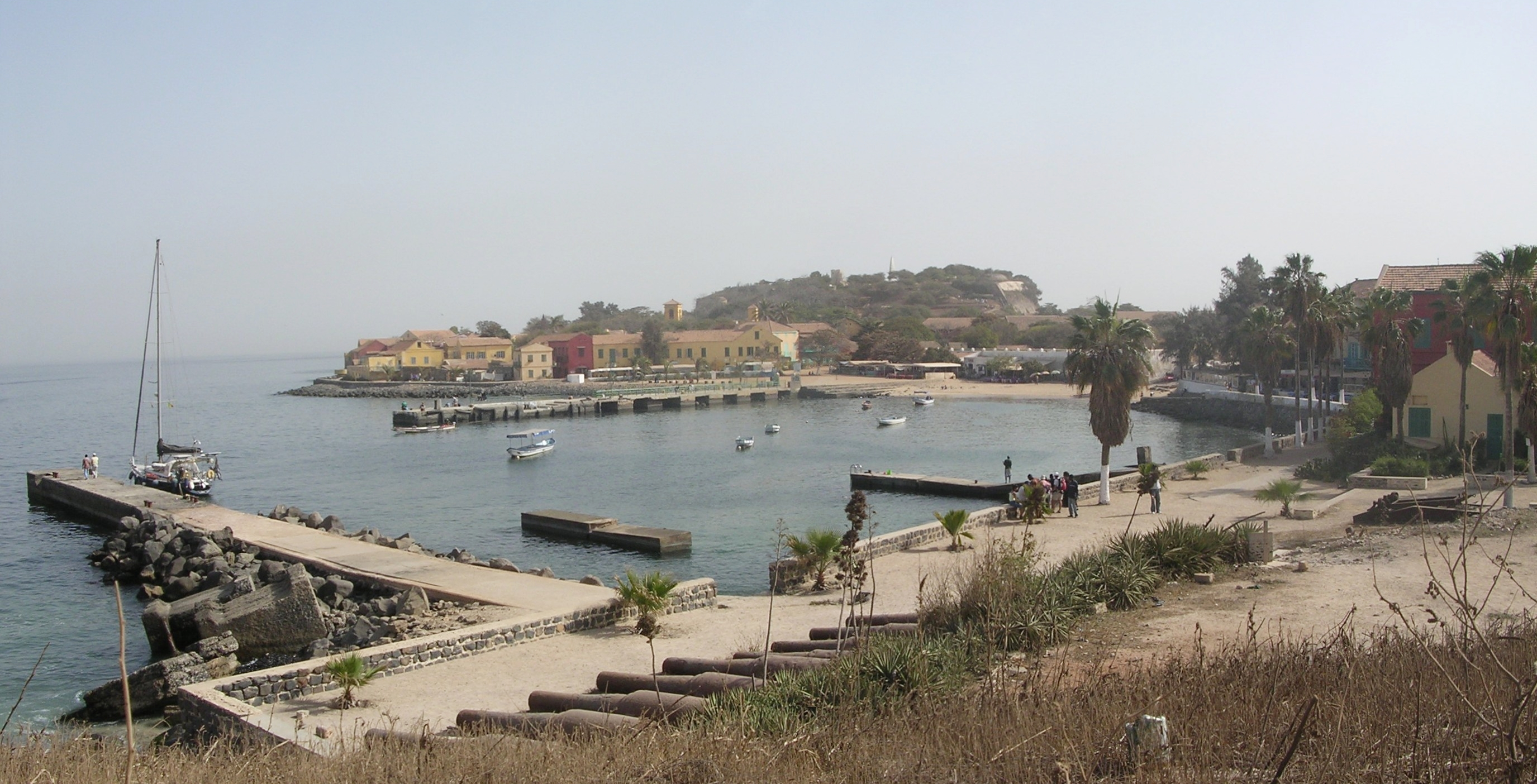
The port on Gorée island (Sénégal).

By 1779, Wall had procured the lieutenant-governorship of Gorée, an island off Senegal. The port, which had a House of Slaves (French: Maison des esclaves), was once part of the Atlantic slave trade. However, with the decline of the slave trade from Senegal in the 1770s, the merchants of Gorée had diversified into other business activities. By the time Wall took the governorship, the island had become an important source for shipments of peanuts, peanut oil, gum arabic, and ivory.

Despite the island's importance at the heart of the British colonial service in West Africa and for being the station for the colonelcy of the attached corps of British troops in Africa, the governorship of Gorée was not a coveted position. The stifling heat made the climate oppressive, disease was rife and the military garrison was notorious for being composed of mutinous troops. Most were poor-quality recruits who had been sent to Gorée for reasons of punishment.

During the voyage out, Wall had a transportee named Green flogged so severely that his bowels protruded from his flesh. He died shortly afterwards. The event had such an effect on Ensign Patrick Wall, Wall's own brother, it was said to have hastened the young man's death soon after he reached Gorée.

By early 1782 Wall, who had served both as governor and superintendent of trade, began preparations to leave the colony because his health had declined.

=== Fatal floggings ===
On 10 July 1782, shortly before Wall left Gorée, a deputation from the African corps, led by Sergeant Benjamin Armstrong, came to see the governor and the commissary to ask for a settlement on their pay as they had been left short for some time on their wages. A parade for the entire garrison was then called. On meeting the delegation, a drunken Wall ordered that the sergeant be arrested on a charge of mutiny. Wall, without holding a court martial, ordered seven men flogged with a rope one inch in diameter by black slaves. On 10 July Sergeant Benjamin Armstrong and George Robinson each received 800 lashes, and on 11 July Corporal Thomas Upton received 350 lashes, Private George Paterson 800 lashes, William Evans 800 lashes, Joseph Shaw 275 lashes and Private Henry Fawcett 47 lashes. From their wounds Corporal Upton died on the 13th, Sergeant Armstrong on the 15th, and George Paterson on 19 July.

== Criminal charges ==
On returning to England, several charges of cruelty were laid against Wall by Captain Benjamin Roberts, one of his former officers. The former governor was brought before the Privy Council for a court-martial. However, when the ship bringing the main witnesses back to Britain was reported lost, the charges were withdrawn against Wall.

Wall then retired to Bath, Somerset. However, when some principal witnesses eventually did arrive in Britain, the Privy Council sent two officers with a warrant to bring him back to London. Wall escaped from their custody at Reading before fleeing to the continent. On 8 March 1784, a proclamation in Britain was issued offering a reward of £200 for his capture.

For the next few years, Wall lived under an assumed name in France and Italy. While in France, he moved about in high society being considered "an accomplished scholar and a man of great science". He frequented the Scots and Irish colleges associated with University of Paris and even may have served in the French Army. He ventured one or two visits to England and Scotland, during one of which he was married. In 1797, he returned to England with the apparent "distant intention" of surrendering himself. On 28 October 1801, he wrote to the British Home secretary, Thomas Pelham, 2nd Earl of Chichester, offering to stand trial. Soon afterwards he was arrested at a house in Upper Thornhaugh Street off Bedford Square, London where he had been living with his wife under the name of Thompson.

== Trial and execution ==
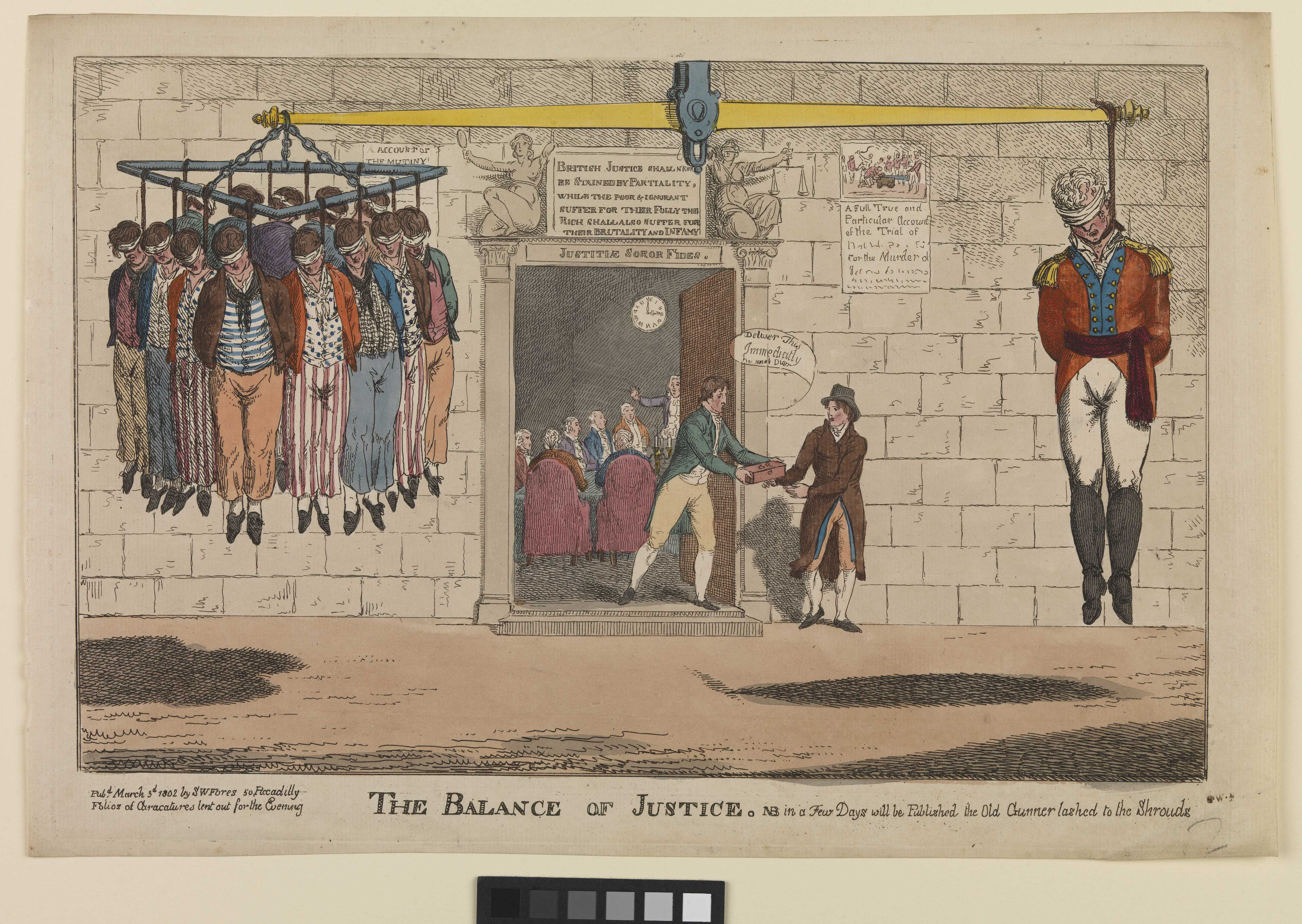
A cartoon of 1802 commenting that Wall's life as an officer was equal to 13 mutinous sailors, a comparison of the punishments dealt out for the Nore mutiny

Wall was charged with three counts of murder from the events of 10 and 11 July, Serjeant Benjamin Armstrong, Serjeant George Paterson and Corporal Thomas Upton. On 20 January 1802, Wall was tried for the murder of Sgt Armstrong at the Old Bailey by a special commission presided over by the Chief Baron, Sir Archibald Macdonald, 1st Baronet. Although Wall addressed the court, he had the assistance of lawyer Newman Knowlys, a future recorder of London, and Sir John Gurney, in examining and cross-examining witnesses. The chief evidence for the prosecution was given by garrison surgeon Peter Ferrick and orderly-sergeant Evan Lewis, who were on duty during Armstrong's punishment. All the other officers had died. The commission decided there was no evidence that there was any mutiny and Wall's claims of justification was not sustained. On accounting as to why he fled, Wall stated that he had left the country in 1784 because he felt the prejudice against him at the time assured him he would not receive a fair trial. He also said the charges against him had been already disproved so the ones relating to Armstrong were unexpected.

The session at the Old Bailey lasted from 9 a.m. till 11 p.m. Its verdict was guilty. Great efforts to obtain a pardon were vainly made by his wife's relative, Charles Howard, 10th Duke of Norfolk, and the privy council held several deliberations on the case. After these appeals, Wall was ordered to be executed on Thursday, 28 January 1802.

On the day, Wall left the condemned cell in Newgate prison at 8 a.m. An immense crowd gave three cheers when he climbed a temporary scaffold outside the prison (known colloquially as the "New Drop"; it had been employed since 1783, when public hangings had ceased at Tyburn). The event is said to have created the largest public interest since the execution of murderer Elizabeth Brownrigg in 1767. Many at the time thought a riot would start if Wall received a pardon. After he was executed by the short drop method of hanging, the body was removed and only formally dissected (the corpse was not eviscerated). It was handed over intact to the family. Wall was buried at St Pancras Old Church in central London. Wall's fate was decided by public feeling. The British establishment feared it would be unwise to spare any officer condemned for brutality against his soldiers after many sailors had been executed following the Spithead and Nore mutinies in 1797.

== Legacy ==
Wall, who at 6 feet 4 inches (193 cm) tall, was described as a man of "genteel appearance", left several children by his wife Frances, fifth daughter of Kenneth Mackenzie, 1st Earl of Seaforth.

Wall had a brother Augustine, who served with him in the army till the peace of 1763, and afterwards went to the Irish bar. He died about 1780 in Ireland. He is described as "a very polished gentleman of great literary acquirements", whose productions in prose and verse were "highly spoken of for their classical elegance and taste", but his chief title to remembrance was the fact of his having been the first who published parliamentary reports with the full names of the speakers.

The notoriety of Wall led to the manufacture of memorabilia associated with his crime. In one case a drinking horn had on one side a carved representation of the punishment of Armstrong; with a label of barbarous exhortation to the flogger from Wall's mouth, and on the reverse a descriptive inscription. (Cat. Engr. Portraits, 22456).
