= List of Cork people =

Cork is the second largest city of Ireland and largest county in Ireland and has produced many noted artists, entertainers, politicians and business people.

== Historical and/or political figures ==
- John Anderson – businessman
- Sir John Arnott – businessman, newspaper owner
- Anthony Barry – politician, photographer
- James Barry - surgeon, possibly born in Cork
- Katty Barry – restaurateur
- Mick Barry – Teachta Dála and Socialist politician.
- Peter Barry – Tánaiste
- Tadhg Barry – journalist, trade unionist and nationalist
- Tom Barry – guerilla leader during war of independence, author of the book Guerilla Days in Ireland
- Olive Beamish – suffragette activist
- Joseph Brennan – civil servant
- Sir George Callaghan – Admiral of the Fleet
- Patrick Cleburne – Major General in the Confederate States Army during the American Civil War
- Hugh Coveney – government minister
- Simon Coveney – Tánaiste
- Thomas Croke – Archbishop of Cashel
- Donal Creed (1924 – 2017): Fine Gael politician; MEP, Teachta Dála, Minister of State under Garret FitzGerald
- Michael Creed (b. 1963): Former Minister for Agriculture, Food and the Marine
- Eileen Desmond – government minister, Senator, MEP
- Orla Egan – LGBTQ+ activist
- Mary Elmes – aid worker honoured as 'Righteous Among the Nations' for saving 200 Jewish children during WWII
- Gerald Goldberg – first Jewish lord mayor
- T. C. Hammond – Church of Ireland clergyman
- William Baylor Hartland – plant breeder, seedsman
- John Pope Hennessy – author, governor of Hong Kong and Mauritius
- Ellen Hutchins – botanist
- Mary Harris "Mother" Jones – labour organiser, born near Cork
- Jim Lane – Irish Republican Socialist
- Arthur Leahy - LGBT activist
- Cornelius Lucey – Bishop of Cork and Ross
- Jack Lynch – Taoiseach and hurler
- Thomas Mac Curtain – Lord Mayor of Cork
- Terence MacSwiney – Lord Mayor and hunger striker
- Daniel Mannix – Roman Catholic Archbishop of Melbourne
- Micheál Martin – Taoiseach
- Sake Dean Mahomed (1759–1851) – Bengali traveller, surgeon, entrepreneur, and one of the most notable early non-European immigrants to the Western World
- Stephen Moylan – Quartermaster General of the Continental Army during the American Revolutionary War
- Michael Murphy – first Irish president of the European Court of Auditors
- Nano Nagle – educator who founded the Presentation Sisters
- William O'Brien – nationalist politician and MP; founder of All-for-Ireland League
- Fergus O'Connor – Irish nationalist and publisher
- Dáithí Ó Conaill – Irish republican
- Jeremiah O'Donovan Rossa – nationalist
- Batt O'Keeffe – government minister
- Michael O'Riordan – socialist politician
- John Cyril Porte – pioneer aviator
- John Roach – major shipbuilder in postbellum United States
- Adi Roche – humanitarian campaigner
- Brendan Ryan – Senator and lecturer at CIT
- William Henry John Seffern – printer, newspaper editor, journalist and historian
- D. D. Sheehan – nationalist politician and first Labour MP
- Canon Patrick Augustine Sheehan – Catholic priest, author, political activist
- Kathy Sinnott – MEP
- Robert Spence – Roman Catholic Archbishop of Adelaide
- William Thompson – political and philosophical writer
- Sir Robert Torrens – Premier of South Australia; pioneer of Land Registration system
- Thady Quill – historical rake
- The Wallace sisters – IRA Intelligence officers

== Scientists ==
- Vincent Barry - chemist
- Susan Bullman - immunologist and oncologist
- Amy Warren - marine biologist and conchologist
- Robert Warren - ornithologist

== Military ==
- James Adams – recipient of the Victoria Cross
- Francisco Burdett O'Connor – officer in the Irish Legion of Simón Bolívar's army
- Josephine Carr – Women's Royal Naval Service woman; first Wren killed in action.
- Michael Collins – revolutionary leader, and Chairman of Provisional Government
- John Dunlay – recipient of the Victoria Cross
- William English – recipient of the Victoria Cross
- Michael Fitzgerald – member of the Irish Republican Army who died on hunger strike
- Richard Fitzgerald – recipient of the Victoria Cross
- Thomas Kent – Irish nationalist
- Thomas Lane – recipient of the Victoria Cross
- Samuel Lawrence – recipient of the Victoria Cross
- David Lord – recipient of the Victoria Cross
- Ambrose Madden – recipient of the Victoria Cross
- Mick Mannock – recipient of the Victoria Cross
- Joe Murphy – Irish republican who died on hunger strike
- James Murray – recipient of the Victoria Cross
- Timothy O'Hea – recipient of the Victoria Cross
- Daniel Florence O'Leary – Irish-born Venezuelan brigadier general of Simón Bolívar's army
- Michael O'Leary – recipient of the Victoria Cross
- Gerald O'Sullivan – recipient of the Victoria Cross
- John Sullivan – recipient of the Victoria Cross
- James Travers – recipient of the Victoria Cross
- Joseph Ward – recipient of the Victoria Cross

== Sports ==
- John Allen – former Irish hurler and Gaelic footballer
- Hugh T. Baker – cricketer
- Mick Barry – road bowler
- James Brophy – cricketer
- Alan Browne – footballer
- Noel Cantwell – international footballer
- Steven Cairns - boxer
- Graham Canty – footballer and international rules captain
- Brian Carney – rugby league, and rugby union footballer of the 1990s and 2000s
- Mark Carroll – long-distance athlete
- Joe Cleary – major league baseball player
- Mark Cohen – cricketer
- Megan Connolly – footballer
- Joe Deane – hurler
- Damien Delaney – international footballer
- Patrick Dineen – cricketer
- Jack Doyle – boxer
- Eddie Dunbar – cyclist
- John Egan – association footballer
- Joe English (sailor), round the world sailor and international yachtsman.
- Percy Exham – cricketer
- James Foley – cricketer
- William Harman – cricketer
- Ryan Hartslief – footballer and rugby player
- Colin Healy – international footballer
- Marian Heffernan – Olympian
- Robert Heffernan – Olympic bronze medalist
- Tom Horan – cricketer (Australia)
- Denis Irwin – international footballer
- Roy Keane – international footballer
- Caoimhín Kelleher – footballer
- Alan Lewis – cricketer, rugby union referee
- Jack McAuliffe – boxer
- Teddy McCarthy – GAA sportsman, played on both Cork hurling and football double winning teams
- Darren McNamara – professional drift driver
- Sam Maguire – GAA sportsman
- David Meyler – international footballer
- Liam Miller – international footballer
- Tony Mullane – major league baseball player
- Saoirse Noonan – international footballer
- Donncha O'Callaghan – rugby union player
- Dr. Pat O'Callaghan – twice Olympic gold medalist
- Frank O'Farrell – international footballer and manager
- Ronan O'Gara – rugby union player
- Seán Óg Ó hAilpín – hurler
- Ciarán Ó Lionáird – international middle-distance athlete
- John O'Shea – darts player
- Derval O'Rourke – world indoor champion hurdler and European outdoor silver medalist 2006
- Bríd Stack - ladies Gaelic and Australian rules footballer
- Denise O'Sullivan – international footballer
- Marcus O'Sullivan – middle-distance athlete
- Sonia O'Sullivan – Olympic silver medalist, world champion athlete and cross country runner
- Christy Ring – hurler
- Peter Stringer – rugby union player

== Film, entertainment and media ==
- Dónal Finn - Actor
- Jack Gleeson – actor
- Sarah Greene – actor
- Eddie Hobbs – TV personality
- George Hook – TV/radio personality
- Fergal Keane, OBE – BBC journalist
- Danny La Rue, OBE – female impersonator
- James Leonard and Timmy Long of The Two Norries podcast
- Joe Lynch – actor
- Mark Mahon – film director
- Pixie McKenna – TV personality, doctor
- Siobhán McSweeney – actor
- Edward Mulhare – TV actor
- Cillian Murphy – actor
- Graham Norton – TV personality
- Bill O'Herlihy – TV personality
- Eoin Reardon – TikToker and YouTuber
- Jonathan Rhys-Meyers – actor
- Tony Scannell – actor
- Fiona Shaw, CBE – actor
- Cailín Ní Toibín – beauty pageant titleholder
- Niall Tóibín – comic actor
- Nora Twomey – animator
- Eileen Walsh – actor

== Literature ==
- Sara Baume – writer
- Máire Bradshaw – poet and publisher
- Daniel Corkery – writer
- Patrick Galvin – poet, singer and playwright
- Trevor Joyce – poet
- Helmut Kollars – writer and illustrator
- Danielle McLaughlin – writer
- Doireann Ní Ghríofa – poet and writer
- Frank O'Connor – author
- Seán Ó Faoláin – writer
- Joseph O'Neill – writer
- Tim O'Reilly – author, publisher, and founder of O'Reilly Media
- Seán Ó Ríordáin – poet
- P. A. Ó Síocháin – journalist, author, lawyer and Irish language activist
- James O'Sullivan – writer and academic
- Eimear Ryan – writer
- William Trevor – writer
- William Wall – author

== Music and arts ==
- Abraham Abell – antiquarian
- James Barry – neoclassical painter
- Kim Carroll – composer and guitarist
- Cathal Coughlan – singer/songwriter
- Dorothy Cross – artist
- Robert Day – antiquarian, photographer
- Ricky Dineen – musician
- Cian Ducrot – singer/songwriter
- Gavin Dunne (better known as Miracle of Sound) – musician
- Chloe Early – artist
- Mick Flannery – singer-songwriter
- Aloys Fleischmann – composer, professor of music at UCC
- Rory Gallagher – singer/songwriter and guitarist
- Patrick Hennessy – painter
- John Hogan – sculptor
- Pina Kollars – singer/songwriter
- Sir Hugh Lane – patron of arts
- Charles Lynch – classical pianist
- Mick Lynch – singer
- Daniel Maclise – artist
- Jimmy McCarthy – singer/songwriter
- Lyra McNamara – singer/songwriter
- Paul McSwiney – composer and dramatist
- Sean O'Hagan – musician
- Una Palliser – violinist, violist, singer
- Allie Sherlock - singer/songwriter
- Brian Smyth – painter
- John Spillane – singer/songwriter
- Henry Jones Thaddeus – painter
- Bambie Thug – singer/songwriter
- Finbar Wright – singer/songwriter

=== Bands ===
- Five Go Down to the Sea?
- The Frank and Walters
- Microdisney
- Rubyhorse
- Stump
- The Sultans of Ping FC
