= 1904 in Ireland =

- Centuries: 18th; 19th; 20th; 21st
- Decades: 1880s; 1890s; 1900s; 1910s; 1920s
- See also: 1904 in the United Kingdom; Other events of 1904; List of years in Ireland

Events in the year 1904 in Ireland.

== Events ==
- 26 April – King Edward VII and Queen Alexandra arrived at Kingstown. The royal couple attended the Punchestown Races for the day.
- 2 May – The King and Queen travelled to Waterford where they stayed at Lismore Castle, home of the Duke of Devonshire. Thomas Horgan of Youghal made the first known film in Ireland of this event.
- 4 May – The final day of the royal visit to Ireland.
- 2 June – The nave of St Anne’s Cathedral, Belfast, was consecrated.
- 27 June – The second Fastnet Rock lighthouse was first lit.
- 28 June – The Danish ocean liner, the SS Norge, was wrecked on Helen's Reef off Rockall with the loss of 635 lives.
- 24 July – St Patrick's Cathedral was consecrated in Armagh town.
- Construction started of Government Buildings, Merrion Street, Dublin (finishes 1922).
- The Limerick Boycott began.
- The first "steamboat ladies" – female students at the women's colleges of the Universities of Oxford and Cambridge – were awarded ad eundem degrees by Trinity College Dublin, at a time when their own universities refused to confer degrees upon women.
- The first woman, Isabel Marion Weir Johnston, began attending Trinity College Dublin.

== Arts and literature ==
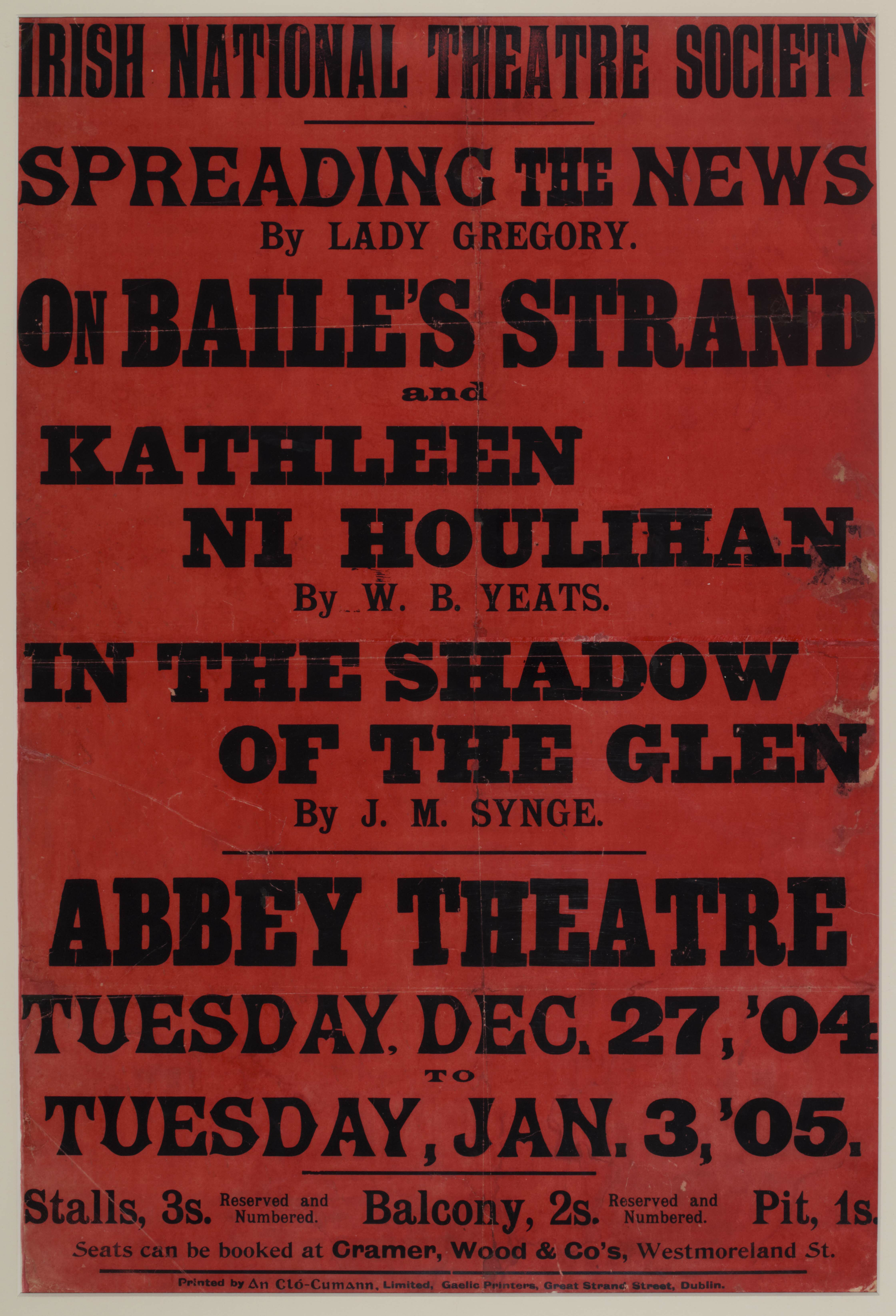
Poster for opening run at the Abbey Theatre, Dublin

- 22 January – Baritone Harry Plunket Greene made his first gramophone recordings.
- 25 February – J. M. Synge's tragedy Riders to the Sea was first performed at the Molesworth Hall, Dublin, by the Irish National Theatre Society.
- 16 May – James Joyce won a prize for singing at a Feis Ceoil held at the Antient Concert Rooms in Great Brunswick Street, Dublin.
- 16 June – The original "Bloomsday", the day James Joyce first walked out with his future wife Nora Barnacle (whom he first met on 10 June), to the Dublin suburb of Ringsend. He set the action of his novel Ulysses (1922) on today's date.
- 1 September – The Leinster School of Music opened at 34 Harcourt Street, Dublin, by Samuel Myerscough. The school (which later added "Drama" to its title) became one of the examining bodies in Ireland for music and drama, moving to Griffith College, Dublin.
- 1 November – George Bernard Shaw's comedy about Ireland, John Bull's Other Island, opened at the Royal Court Theatre, London, after W. B. Yeats rejected it for the Abbey Theatre.
- 27 December – The Irish National Theatre Society (Abbey Theatre) opened to the public in Dublin for the first time. The bill consisted of three one-act plays, On Baile's Strand and Cathleen Ní Houlihan by Yeats and Spreading the News by Lady Gregory.
- The Ulster Literary Theatre was established.
- Lady Gregory published Gods and Fighting Men, a retelling of Irish mythology in English.
- 'Æ' (George William Russell) published The Divine Vision, and Other Poems.
- James Joyce's story "Eveline" was published.
- Arthur Griffith's The Resurrection of Hungary was published.
- Peadar Ua Laoghaire's story Séadna was first published in book form.
- Grace Rhys's story The Charming of Estercel was published.

== Sport ==
=== Association football ===
- International
  - 12 March – Ireland 1–3 England (in Belfast)
  - 21 March – Wales 0–1 Ireland (in Bangor)
  - 26 March – Ireland 1–1 Scotland (in Dublin)
  Irish League
  - Winners: Linfield F.C.
  Irish Cup
  - Winners: Linfield F.C. 5–1 Derry Celtic F.C.
- Shelbourne F.C. became the second Dublin team to join the Irish Football League, after Bohemian F.C. who joined the previous year.

=== Athletics at the 1904 Summer Olympics – Men's all-around ===
- Winner: Tom Kiely (in St. Louis, Missouri)

=== Camogie ===
- 17 July – The first public game of camogie was played between Dublin teams Craobh an Chéitinnigh (Keatings branch of the Gaelic League) and Cúchulainns at a feis at the Meath agricultural showground in Navan.

== Births ==
- 16 January – Frederick Boland, diplomat, first Irish ambassador to Britain and to the United Nations (died 1985).
- 26 January – Seán MacBride, Clann na Poblachta party TD, Cabinet minister and Nobel Peace Prize winner (died 1988).
- 19 February – Muiris Ó Súilleabháin, writer (drowned 1950).
- 29 February – James Hamilton, 4th Duke of Abercorn, soldier and politician (died 1979).
- 7 March – Jim Ganly, cricketer and rugby player (died 1976).
- 27 April – Cecil Day-Lewis, poet and writer, Poet Laureate of the United Kingdom from 1967 to 1972 (died 1972).
- 7 May – David Sullivan, labour leader in USA (died 1976).
- 5 June – Derrick Kennedy, cricketer (died 1976).
- 5 July – Michael McLaverty, novelist (died 1992).
- 20 July – Molly Keane (born Mary Nesta Skrine), novelist and playwright (died 1996).
- 17 August – John "Pondoro" Taylor, hunter and writer (died 1969).
- 9 September – Jack Lawrence, cricketer (died 1984).
- 2 October – Dermot Boyle, Marshal of the Royal Air Force (died 1993).
- 21 October – Patrick Kavanagh, poet and novelist (died 1967).
- 13 December – William McCrea, astronomer and mathematician (died 1999).

== Deaths ==
- 22 January – George Salmon, mathematician and theologian (born 1819).
- 21 March – William Russell Grace, businessman and first Roman Catholic mayor of New York (born 1832).
- 5 April – Frances Power Cobbe, social reformer, feminist theorist, pioneer animal rights activist and writer (born 1822).
- 7 April – Timothy J. Campbell, Democratic party U.S. Representative from New York State (born 1840).
- 25 May – Richard Harte Keatinge, recipient of the Victoria Cross for gallantry in 1858 at Chundairee, India (born 1825).
- 28 August – John Saul, prostitute (born 1857).
- 15 September – John Kelly, coal merchant of John Kelly Limited (born 1840).
- 20 October – Richard Phelan, fourth Roman Catholic bishop of Pittsburgh, Pennsylvania (born 1828).
- 16 November – James Cooney, lawyer and Democratic party politician in Missouri (born 1848).
- Full date unknown – Edwin Hayes, watercolourist (born 1819).

== See also ==
- 1904 in Scotland
- 1904 in Wales
