= 1900 in Ireland =

- Centuries: 17th; 18th; 19th; 20th; 21st
- Decades: 1880s; 1890s; 1900s; 1910s; 1920s
- See also: 1900 in the United Kingdom; Other events of 1900; List of years in Ireland

Events in the year 1900 in Ireland.

== Events ==
- 16 January – Three lion cubs reared by an Irish red setter went on view at Dublin Zoo.
- 17 January – The different sections of the Nationalist Party met in the Dublin Mansion House's Oak Room to promote national unity.
- 6 February – The Irish National League and Irish National Federation re-united within the Irish Parliamentary Party, with John Redmond elected as compromise chairman.
- 28 February – Unofficial figures showed that the Royal Dublin Fusiliers suffered the most in the Second Boer War.
- 12 March – The 45th Company of the Imperial Yeomanry left Dublin for service in South Africa.
- 17 March – In celebration of Saint Patrick's Day, the Lord Lieutenant (Earl Cadogan), accompanied by his staff, reviewed a military display in the yard of Dublin Castle, followed by dinner and a ball in Saint Patrick's Hall that evening.
- 1 April – The Irish Guards regiment of the British Army was formed by order of Queen Victoria to honour the Irish troops fighting in the Boer War for the British Empire.

Queen Victoria in Dublin, 1900

- 4 April – Queen Victoria arrived at Kingstown and travelled to Dublin where she was greeted by the Lord Mayor and members of the corporation.
- 7 April – 52,000 children greeted Queen Victoria at the Phoenix Park in Dublin.
- 23 April – At a meeting in Loughrea, County Galway, Douglas Hyde complained of the rapid anglicisation of the country and the loss of the Irish language.
- 11 May – Edward Carson became Solicitor General for England and Wales and was knighted.
- 13 May – The rift in the Irish Parliamentary Party was healed as John Dillon and John Redmond shared a platform for the first time in ten years.
- 5 July – The British War Office issued a list of Irish prisoners of the Boers from the 1st Battalion Royal Irish Fusiliers. It named 473 men from eight companies.
- 31 December – Ceremonies all over the country marked the closing of the 19th century and the dawning of the 20th.
- Richard J. Ussher and Robert Warren published The Birds of Ireland in London.

== Arts and literature ==
- The Irish Literary Theatre staged three plays at the Gaiety Theatre, Dublin with an English company: Edward Martyn's Maeve; Alice Milligan's The Last Feast of the Fianna; and George Moore's satirical The Bending of the Bough: a comedy in five acts (an adaptation of his cousin Martyn's The Tale of a Town).
- 'Moira O'Neill' published Songs of the Glens of Antrim.

== Sport ==
=== Association football ===
- International
  24 February Wales 2–0 Ireland (in Llandudno)
  3 March Ireland 0–2 Scotland (in Belfast)
  17 March Ireland 0–2 England (in Dublin: the first International match played here)
  Irish League
  Winners: Belfast Celtic
  Irish Cup
  Winners: Cliftonville 2–1 Bohemians
- Derry Celtic was founded and joined the Irish Football League.

== Births ==
- 10 January – Harry Kernoff, artist (died 1974)
- 19 January – Frank Devlin, badminton player (died 1988)
- January – Michael Donnellan, founder of the Clann na Talmhan party and TD (died 1964)
- 4 February – Robert Edgeworth-Johnstone, chemical engineer (died 1994 in France)
- 16 February – John Stewart Collis, writer and pioneer ecologist (died 1984) and his twin Robert Collis, physician and writer (died 1975)
- 22 February – Seán Ó Faoláin, short story writer (died 1991)
- 27 February – James Ennis, cricketer (died 1976)
- 1 March – Nano Reid, painter (died 1981)
- 6 March – Mark Deering, Fine Gael party TD (died 1972)
- 25 May – John Hunt, expert on mediaeval art (died 1976)
- 10 July – Paul Vincent Carroll, dramatist (died 1968)
- 17 July – Paddy Smith, Fianna Fáil party TD and longest-serving member of Dáil Éireann (54 years) (died 1982)
- 22 July – Michael Davern, Fianna Fáil TD for Tipperary South 1948–1965 (died 1973)
- 20 August – Seosamh Mac Grianna, writer (died 1990)
- 26 August – Eudie Coughlan, Cork hurler (died 1987)
- 30 August – Martin King, Galway hurler (died 1969)
- 2 October – Hubert Butler, writer and historian (died 1991)
- 18 October – Sarah Makem, traditional singer (died 1983)
- 23 October
  - Paddy Ahern, Cork hurler (died 1971)
  - Hubert Butler, scholar, essayist and humanitarian (died 1991)
- 27 October – Peter Kerley, radiologist (died 1979)
- October – Frank Ryan, tenor (died 1965)
- 2 November – William Norton, Labour party leader, TD and Cabinet minister (died 1963)
- 19 November – Pamela Hinkson, writer (died 1982)
- 4 December – Tom Farquharson, association football player (died 1970)
- 23 December – Noel Purcell, actor (died 1985)
- Full date unknown – John Doherty, fiddle player (died 1980)

== Deaths ==
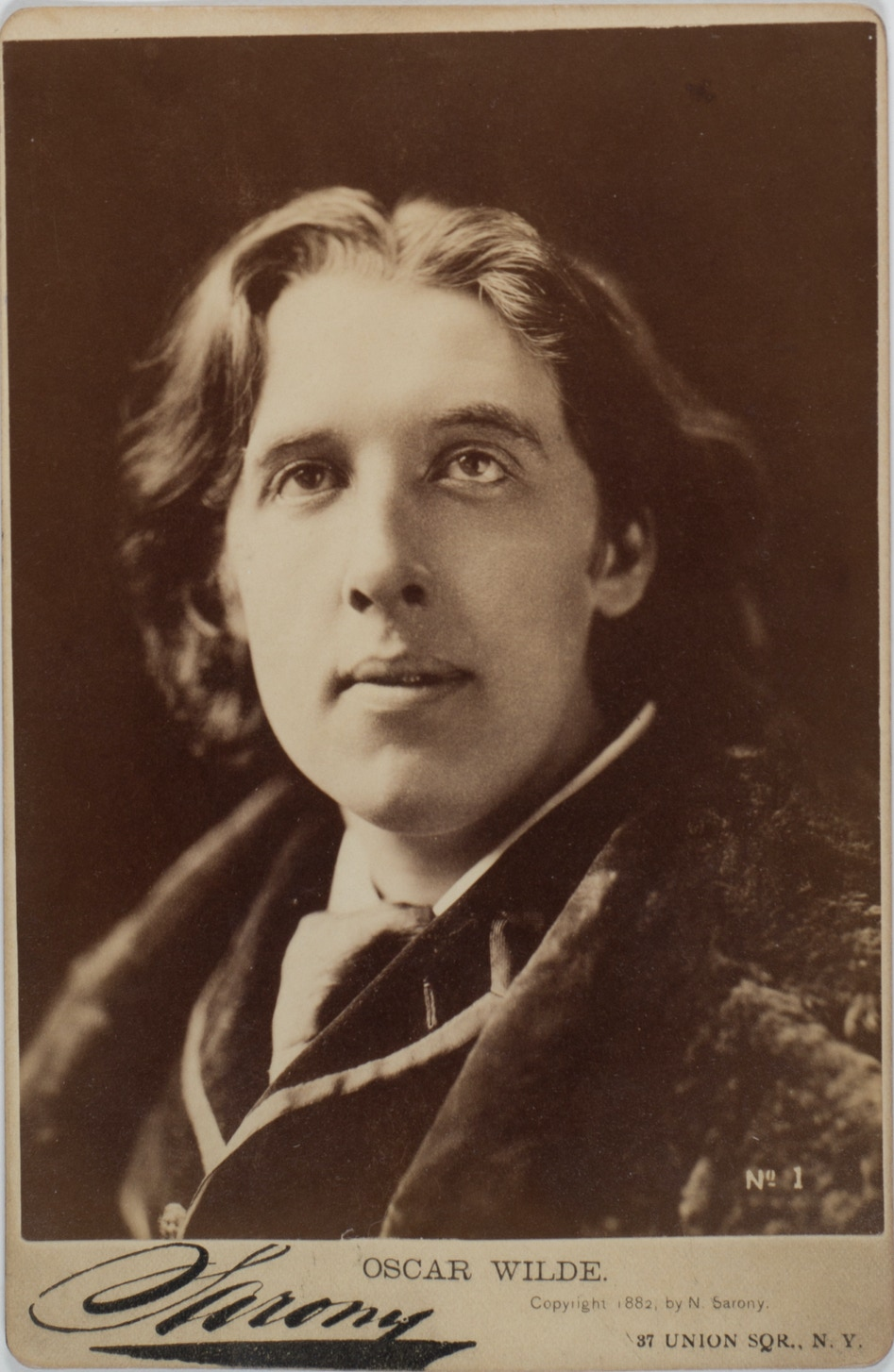
Oscar Wilde

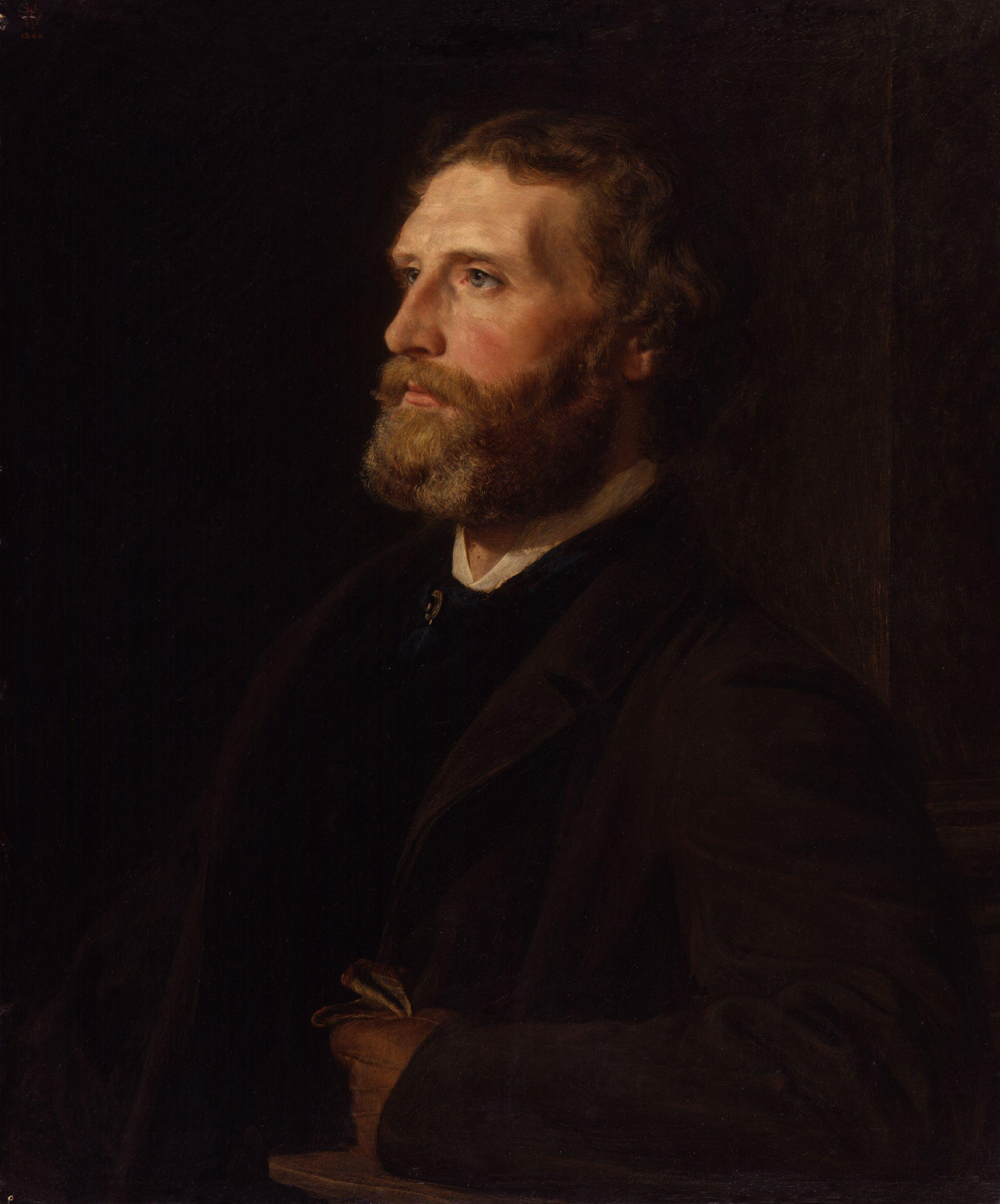
Sir Frederic William Burton

- 19 January – William Larminie, poet and folklorist (born 1849)
- 23 January – Abraham Boulger, soldier, recipient of the Victoria Cross for gallantry in 1857 at Lucknow, India (born 1835)
- 23 January – James Pearson, soldier, recipient of the Victoria Cross for gallantry in 1858 at Jhansi, India (born 1822)
- 7 March – Thomas Preston, scientist (born 1860)
- 16 March – Frederick William Burton, painter (born 1816)
- 22 March – Thomas Murphy, recipient of the Victoria Cross for bravery at sea in saving life in a storm off the Andaman Islands in 1867 (born 1839)
- 26 April – John Hawkins Hagarty, lawyer, teacher and judge in Canada (born 1816)
- 2 July – Thomas Farrell, sculptor (born 1827)
- 12 November – Marcus Daly, businessman in America (born 1841)
- 30 November – Oscar Wilde, playwright, novelist and poet, died in France (born 1854)
- 14 December – Paddy Ryan, boxer (born 1851)
- Full date unknown – Thomas Workman, entomologist and arachnologist (born 1843)

== See also ==
- 1900 in Scotland
- 1900 in Wales
