= 1906 in Ireland =

- Centuries: 18th; 19th; 20th; 21st
- Decades: 1880s; 1890s; 1900s; 1910s; 1920s
- See also: 1906 in the United Kingdom; Other events of 1906; List of years in Ireland

Events in the year 1906 in Ireland.

== Events ==
- 4 January – Irish Parliamentary Party member of parliament William O'Brien called on nationalists to extract the maximum concessions for Ireland from every British government.
- 16 May – Temperance reformers met with the Lord-Lieutenant to seek Sunday closing for all public houses, earlier closing on Saturdays, and a reduction of public house licences throughout the country.
- 6 June – The Iveagh Baths opened in Dublin.
- 1 August – The Catholic Hierarchy ruled out any scheme for mixed religious education at Trinity College Dublin.
- 7 August – Douglas Hyde was awarded the freedom of Dublin.
- 8 August – A Parisian court granted a separation to Maud Gonne and John MacBride; Gonne was given custody of their son, Seán MacBride.

=== Full date unknown ===
- September – St Eunan's College opened in Letterkenny.
- The Royal Victoria Hospital, Belfast was completed, laying claim to being the first air conditioned building in the world.
- Work on the building of Belfast City Hall was completed.
- Alice Perry became the first woman to graduate with a degree in civil engineering in Ireland or Britain, at Queen's College, Galway, and was appointed in December as acting county surveyor for Galway.

== Arts and literature ==
- 'Æ' (George William Russell) published his poetry collection By Still Waters.
- Douglas Hyde edited and translated The Religious Songs of Connacht from Irish into English.
- Winifred Mary Letts' one-act play The Eyes of the Blind premiered at the Abbey Theatre, Dublin.
- W. B. Yeats published his Poems, 1899–1905.
- Ella Young published her first book of verse, Poems.

== Sport ==
=== Association football ===
- International
  17 February – Ireland 0–5 England (in Belfast) (25th annual match with no Irish wins) Val Harris became the first Dubliner to play for Ireland.
  17 March – Ireland 0–1 Scotland (in Dublin)
  2 April – Wales 4–4 Ireland (in Wrexham)
- Irish League
  Winners: Cliftonville F.C. and Distillery F.C. The title was shared after two playoff matches ended in draws.
- Irish Cup
  Winners: Shelbourne F.C. 2–0 Belfast Celtic. Shelbourne became the first Dublin club to win the Irish Cup.

=== Athletics ===
- 22 April–2 May: in the Intercalated Games in Athens, Peter O'Connor beat Con Leahy to win Gold in the hop, step and jump, and also took Silver in the long jump. At the ceremony to mark the latter event, O'Connor scaled a flagpole and hoisted an Erin Go Bragh flag in protest at being put on the British team.

== Births ==
- 4 February – Letitia Dunbar-Harrison, librarian (died 1994 in Northern Ireland).
- 13 February – Máirtín Ó Cadhain, Irish language writer (died 1970).
- 13 April – Samuel Beckett, Nobel Prize in Literature, playwright, novelist, and poet (died 1989).
- 24 May – John Joseph Scanlan, second Bishop of the Roman Catholic Diocese of Honolulu (died 1997).
- 1 July – Ivan Neill, major and Unionist politician (died 2001 in Northern Ireland).
- 19 July – Hugh T. Baker, cricketer (died 1989).
- 11 August – James Graham, cricketer (died 1942).
- 28 September – William Hare, 5th Earl of Listowel, peer and Labour party politician (died 1997).
- 28 September – Lawrence Parsons, 6th Earl of Rosse (d. c.1979).
- 22 October – Charles Lynch, pianist (died 1984).
- 10 December – Padraig Marrinan, artist (died 1975 in Northern Ireland).

== Deaths ==
- 2 March – Ellen Mary Clerke, author, journalist, poet, and science writer (born 1840).
- 30 May – Michael Davitt, republican, nationalist agrarian agitator, social campaigner, labour leader, and Irish National Land League founder (born 1846).
- 7 July – John Drummond, early settler and explorer in Western Australia, first Inspector of Native Police there (born 1816).
- 21 October – Edward James Saunderson, leader of the Irish Unionist Party in the British House of Commons (born 1837).
- 10 November – John Richardson Wigham, lighting engineer (born 1829 in Scotland).
- 27 November – Michael Cusack, founder of the Gaelic Athletic Association (born 1847).

== See also ==
- 1906 in Scotland
- 1906 in Wales
