= Robert Warren (ornithologist) =

Irish naturalist

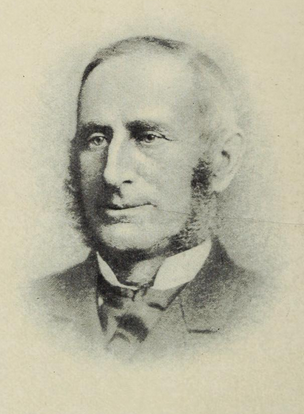
- Born: 22 March 1829; Cork, County Cork, Ireland
- Died: 26 November 1915 (aged 86); Cork
- Known for: Ornithology
- Scientific career
- Fields: Botany, Ornithology

Robert Warren (1829–1915) was an Irish ornithologist who co-authored The Birds of Ireland.

== Life ==
Robert Warren was born in Cork on 22 March 1829. His parents were Robert and Matilda (nee Hopper) Warren. He a brother and two sisters. Both Warren's father and brother, Edward, were also interested in the study of birds. Warren's sister, Amy, went on to become marine biologist and conchologist.

He grew up at his father's residence, Castle Warren. In his early years he became friend with J. R. Harvey and corresponded with fellow Irish ornithologist William Thompson in Belfast. Thompson frequently quoted Warren's letters in his Natural History of Ireland, and they continued to correspond until Thompson's death in 1852.

In 1851 he moved to Moyview, County Sligo, where he studied the birds of Killala Bay, Bartragh Island and the River Moy, writing papers for the Proceedings of the Dublin Natural History Society. In 1900 he was co-author with Richard J. Ussher of The Birds of Ireland. However, Robert Lloyd Praeger and others credit much of the book to Ussher, though Charles Bethune Moffat stated: "beside writing a number of articles, has contributed enough from his great store of personal observations on birds to considerably enrich the book."

Warren died at this Cork residence, Ardnaree, on 26 November 1915.

A number of specimens collected and identified by Warren are held in the Natural History Museum in Dublin. Most notably, he was involved in securing the specimen of the Humpback Whale, which hung in the museum until 2020. The whale was stranded at Killala Bay on 21 March 1893. In Castleconnor a walkway is named after him.

== Bibliography ==
- Warren, Robert; Ussher, Richard J. (1900). The Birds of Ireland. An account of the distribution, migrations and habits of birds as observed in Ireland, with all additions to the Irish list. London: Gurney and Jackson. OCLC 5169785.
