= Odostomia wareni =

Scientific classification
- Kingdom: Animalia
- Phylum: Mollusca
- Class: Gastropoda
- Family: Pyramidellidae
- Genus: Odostomia
- Species: O. wareni

Binomial name
- Odostomia wareni (Schander, 1994)

Synonyms
- Liostomia wareni Schander, 1994; Odostomia vanurki van Aartsen, Gittenberger & Goud, 1998

Species of gastropod

Odostomia wareni is a species of sea snail, a marine gastropod mollusk in the family Pyramidellidae, the pyrams and their allies.

== Description ==
The slender, white to transparent shell has a nearly cylindrical shape with an obtuse apex. Its length measures 1.7 mm. The whorls of the protoconch are intorted. The teleoconch contains 3½ rounded whorls. The suture is well marked. The growth lines are somewhat prosocline (i.e. with the growth lines leaning forward (adapically) with respect to the direction of the cone) and not strongly marked. The sculpture of the surface is smooth and shiny. The outer lip is thin. There is no umbilicus. The columellar tooth is weak and is deeply seated inside the pyriform aperture.

The species was discovered and named by Christoffer Schander in honour of Irish conchologist Amy Warren in 1994.

== Distribution ==
This species occurs in the Atlantic Ocean in the following locations:

- Cape Verdes
- Ghana
- São Tomé and Principe Archipelagos
- Senegal
