= Taranaki Herald =

Defunct New Zealand newspaper (1852–1989)

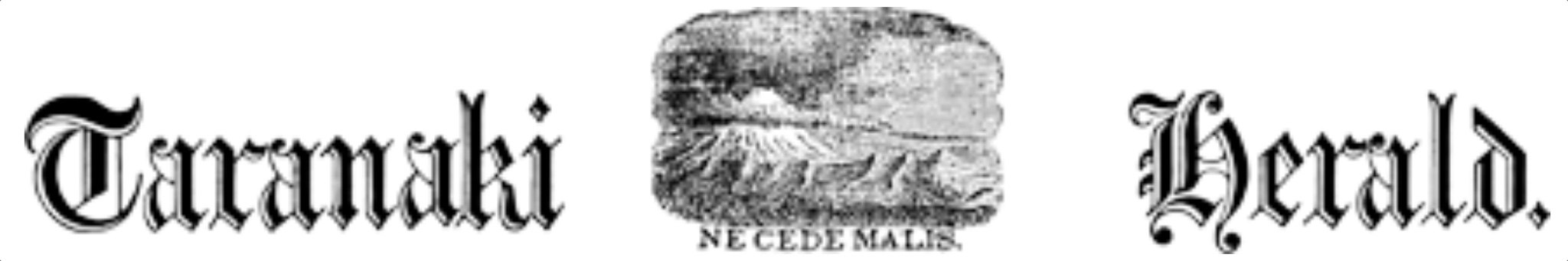

The Taranaki Herald was an afternoon daily newspaper, published in New Plymouth, New Zealand. It began publishing as a four-page tabloid on 4 August 1852. It was the first newspaper published in Taranaki, and it became the country's oldest daily newspaper when the Lyttelton Times closed in 1935. The Taranaki Herald ceased publication in 1989.

== History ==
The newspaper was founded by William Collins and Garland William Woon, who hired William Morgan Crompton as its first editor. It began as a weekly paper, moved to twice-weekly publication in 1867 and began appearing daily in 1877.

Crompton was replaced as editor in 1854 by Richard Pheney, who quit in November 1856 when he opposed the newspaper owner's support for George Cutfield over Charles Brown as Taranaki Superintendent. In May 1857 Pheney was appointed as the first editor of a rival newspaper, the Taranaki News, which changed its name to the Taranaki Daily News when it began daily publication three years later.

Woon, who took over as editor following Pheney's departure, became renowned for his reporting of conflicts between imperial forces and local Māori in the First Taranaki War, with his paper being sold by subscription throughout Europe. In May 1860 he was accused by military authorities of writing material that could give "information to the enemy" after criticising the defence of the town and he ran an issue with one offending paragraph removed, the white space being filled with fullpoints. It remained the one and only time the Herald was censored.

In late 1867, the paper was sold to Henry Weston and his family retained strong links with the paper for the next 111 years. Weston was sole proprietor until 1920; his nephew Walter C. Weston took over until 1930 when it was registered as a private company. Weston remained as chairman and managing director and his wife, Lillian Weston, was a director until her death in 1978.

=== Merger and end of publication ===
In 1962, the Taranaki Herald and Taranaki Daily News, both of which were struggling with rising costs and the need for updated equipment, were amalgamated as Taranaki Newspapers Ltd, a subsidiary of NZ News Ltd, which owned the Auckland Star and Christchurch Star. Publication was merged at the Herald building in Currie St, New Plymouth, which it had occupied since 1900, and while the administration and publishing activity was combined, the editorial departments were kept separate and stayed fiercely competitive. Taranaki Newspapers was bought by Independent Newspapers Ltd (INL) in 1989, which closed the Herald because of falling circulation and advertising volumes.

== Other newspapers by same publisher ==
Other newspapers published by the Herald included the Budget and the Taranaki Weekly Herald (1877–1932), the Sports Herald (1926–1930, 1946–1972) and during World War II a special weekly Overseas News Sheet for servicemen.

== Editors and journalists ==
Editors included: William Henry John Seffern (1868–1895), Walter J. Penn (1895–1932), G. H. Dolby (1932–1937), A. B. Scanlan (1937–1965), Rash Avery (1965–1973), George Koea (1973–1987) and Lance Girling-Butcher (1987–1989). Walter J. Penn was father of Constance Penn Chapple and grandfather to Pilot Officer Paxton Chapple who died in service in Italy on 25 April 1945 and is buried in Ancona War Cemetery, Provincia di Ancona, Marche, Italy.

Its journalists have included June Litman, New Zealand's first female news editor, broadcaster Derryn Hinch, Western Institute of Technology at Taranaki (WITT) journalism head Jim Tucker, INL boss Rick Neville, former Dominion editor Richard Long, Ray Cleaver and singer Lew Pryme.
