= Joyce Redman =

Actress

- Born: Joyce Olivia Redman; 7 December 1915; Gosforth, Northumberland, England
- Died: 9 May 2012 (aged 96); Pembury, Kent, England
- Resting place: Faversham Cemetery, Faversham, Kent, England
- Education: Royal Academy of Dramatic Art
- Occupation: Actress
- Years active: 1938–2001
- Spouse: Charles Ivor Wynne-Roberts (m. 1949; died 1992)
- Children: 3

Joyce Olivia Redman (7 December 1915 – 9 May 2012) was an Anglo-Irish actress. She received two Oscar nominations for Best Supporting Actress for her performances in the 1963 film Tom Jones and the 1965 film Othello.

== Early life ==
Joyce Redman was born at 15 Osborne Terrace, Gosforth, Northumberland, into an Anglo-Irish family and grew up in County Mayo, Ireland. Her father was Sydney George Redman, who at the time of her birth was a consultant engineer serving as a major in the Northumberland Fusiliers. Her mother was Irish born Marie Edith McCormick. She was educated by a private governess in Ireland, along with her three sisters. She trained in acting at the Royal Academy of Dramatic Art in London, graduating in 1936.

== Career ==
Redman’s early stage career in the 1940s included acclaimed performances in Shadow and Substance, Claudia, and Lady Precious Stream. She toured internationally, performing at the Comédie-Française in Paris and achieving notable success in New York in 1949 playing Anne Boleyn opposite Rex Harrison as Henry VIII in Maxwell Anderson's play Anne of the Thousand Days. In 1955, she joined Stratford-upon-Avon's Shakespeare Memorial Theatre to play Helena in All's Well That Ends Well and Mistress Ford in The Merry Wives of Windsor. Later television work included the 1974 BBC serial Notorious Woman, in which she portrayed Sophie Dupin, the mother of George Sand.

Although primarily a stage actress, Redman appeared in a select number of films, earning critical recognition and international fame. She received Academy Award nominations for her roles in Tom Jones (1963) as the sexually provocative Mrs. Waters and in Othello (1965) as the outspoken Emilia, acting alongside Maggie Smith and Laurence Olivier. Her performance in Othello also garnered a Golden Globe nomination. In 1968, Redman starred in the birth-control comedy Prudence and the Pill, directed by Ronald Neame and featuring Deborah Kerr and David Niven. Her character became pregnant after her daughter substituted some contraceptive pills with aspirin, inadvertently undermining her mother’s intended "liberation".

Redman was admired for her ability to move seamlessly between comedy and tragedy, with stage roles ranging from Cordelia in King Lear to Dol Common in The Alchemist, and Elizabeth Proctor in The Crucible to Mrs Frail in Love for Love. She appeared in television dramas including Tales of the Unexpected and The Ruth Rendell Mysteries, concluding her screen career as an elderly Queen Victoria in Victoria & Albert (2001).

== Personal life ==
In 1949, Redman married Charles Wynne Roberts, a former British Army captain who later worked as a television executive. The couple had three children, including Crispin Redman, who pursued a career in acting. Redman and Roberts remained married until his death. Their three children and five grandchildren survive her. Her son Crispin Redman is an actor. Her son-in-law is the investment manager and media personality Justin Urquhart Stewart.

Redman maintained a connection to her native County Mayo. In 1949, she purchased Bartragh Island, which had been in her family for several generations, and retained ownership for several decades before selling it in 1984. She spent her later years living in Kent, England. Redman died in Pembury, Kent, England, on 9 May 2012 at age 96 from pneumonia.

== Filmography ==
Year	Title	Role	Notes
1941	Spellbound	The Maid	
1942	One of Our Aircraft Is Missing	Jet van Dieren	
1963	Tom Jones	Jenny Jones / Mrs. Waters	Nominated — Academy Award for Best Supporting Actress
1965	Othello	Emilia	Nominated — Academy Award for Best Supporting Actress Nominated — Golden Globe Award for Best Supporting Actress – Motion Picture
1968	Prudence and the Pill	Grace Hardcastle	
1978	Les Misérables	Magliore	TV movie
1980	The Party	Mrs. Linda Knox/ wife	Tales of the Unexpected; Series 3, Ep. 9/ TV series
1985	A Different Kind of Love	Mrs. Prior	

== Reviews / biographical pieces ==
- "Anne". The New Yorker. Vol. 24, no. 45. 1 January 1949. pp. 12–13.
