= Knocknaheeny =

Suburb of Cork, Ireland

Knocknaheeny Cnoc na hAoine
- Suburb
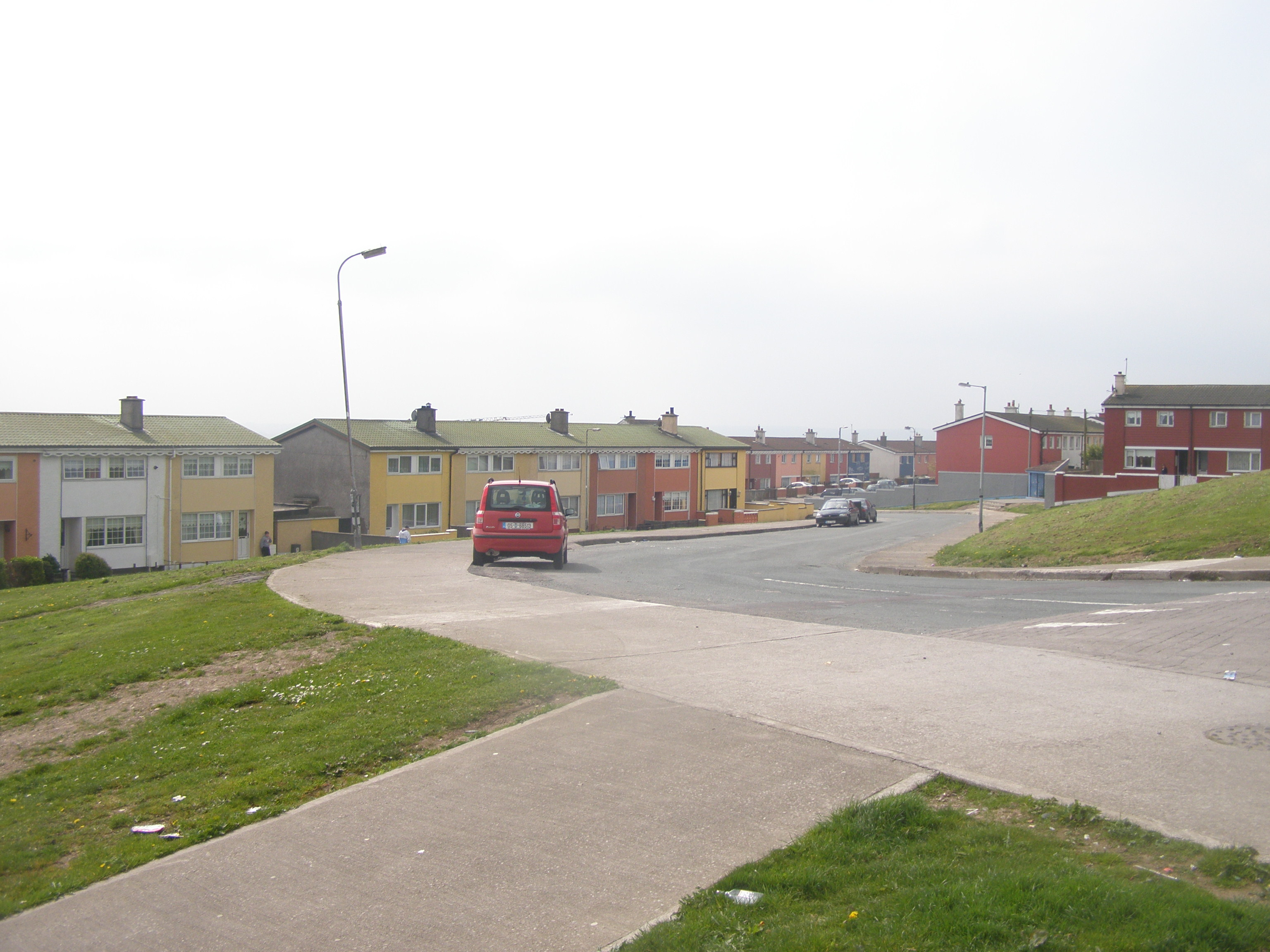
- Housing estate in Knocknaheeney

- Location within County Cork
- Coordinates: 51.9065°N 8.5085°W
- Country: Ireland
- Administrative area: Cork (city)
- Constituency: Cork North-Central

Population (2016)
  - Total: 4,044
- (Knocknaheeny Electoral Division)

Knocknaheeny (Irish: Cnoc na hAoine, meaning 'Hill of Friday') is a working class suburb of Cork city, Ireland. It is on a hill about 2 km north of the city centre. The area is mainly residential, consisting of many terraced council housing estates.

Knocknaheeny contains Apple's Europe headquarters, employing about 5,000 people.

== Name and crest ==
Knocknaheeny is translated from the Irish Cnoc na hAoine meaning "Hill of Friday". This is thought by some to reference the hill upon which Jesus Christ was crucified.

The Knocknaheeny crest is blue and black in colour and includes the Irish name, Cnoc na hAoine. The crest features three images: a windmill, a swallow and the area's water tower with three stars to represent Knocknaheeny, Hollyhill and Knocknacullen.

== History ==
In the early 1970s, Cork City Council (then the Cork Corporation) began to develop housing estates on the areas. These were used to house and rehouse people from slightly older areas of the city, including those who grew up in neighbouring Churchfield, Farranree and Gurranabraher. These older townlands were named after plants; for instance Knocknaheeny (the Hill of the Friday/Rushes), Knocknacullen (Hill of Holly), Knockfree (the Hill of Heather) and Shanakiel (Old Wood or Foxes Wood).

In the late 1970s and 1980s, Knocknaheeny had a very young population. The local primary school, Scoil Mhuire ar Cnoc na hAoine (St. Mary's on the Hill), was granted extensions to cope with over-populated classrooms. Scoil Mhic Shuibhne (now Terence McSwiney Community College) was opened in 1979, the first VEC (Vocational Educational Committee) mixed school. By the end of the 1980s and into the 1990s, the school had a population of over 800 students. Like other local schools, enrollment has dropped and stabilized at under half that number, mainly due to changing demographics of an aging population and the Celtic tiger – an economic boom in Ireland from the mid-1990s to mid-2000s fueled by foreign investment – which enabled many families to relocate and purchase homes in newer estates in the Cork county region. As of 2009, approximately 4,500 people lived in Knocknaheeney.

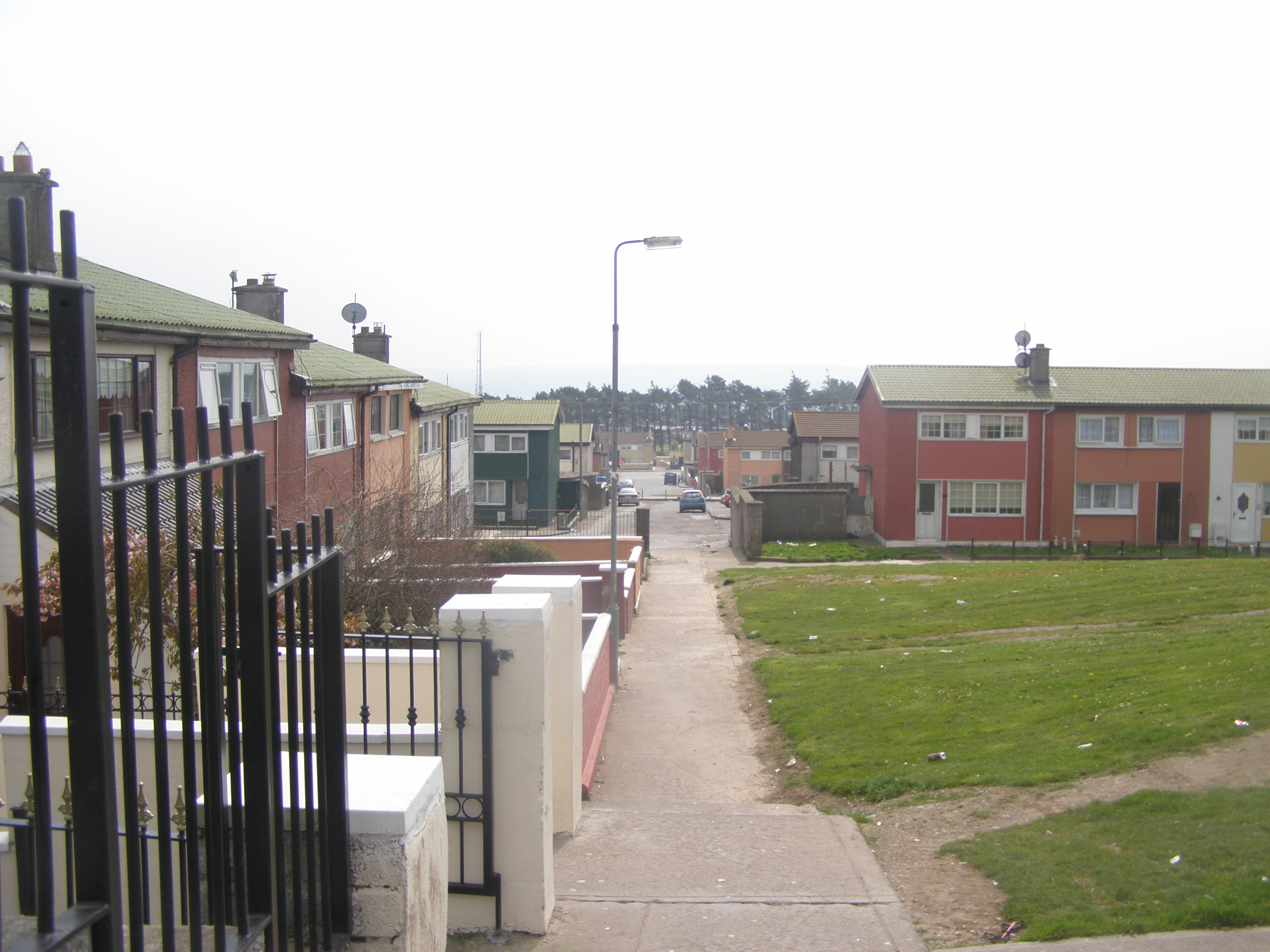
Residential park in Knocknaheeny

Some houses in Knocknaheeny have fallen into neglect. However Cork City Council have made efforts to improve this situation and development is now visible with a new Town Centre under construction on Harbour View Road. Residential areas are also popping up with housing now erected at the Reservoir (Rezza) stretching to Nash's Boreen and new affordable housing located on Hollyhill Lane and the Shanakiel Development at the top of the Blarney Road.

In the early 21st century, plans were put in place to demolish the greater part of Knocknaheeny and rebuild it in phases. Locals were consulted but there was some resistance and reluctance by many who felt that the council held no regard for the sense of community and ties built up over the years. There was also some questioning of the City Council's relationship with Apple Inc., which planned expansion of their headquarters for Europe, the Middle East and Africa, and wanted a new road built where houses stood. Concerns increased with Apple's subsequent plans to buy land that include part of an old pilgrimage route and a newer section of a main road circling the outside of the neighbourhood. Nevertheless, 2014 saw the first phase of rehousing. Those whose houses have to be demolished – both council-owned and privately owned houses – were rehoused in neighbouring areas. Those who had purchased their houses from the city and who had not agreed to have the properties demolished had to wait for the alternative housing that the council offered, with some remaining in their homes while demolition occurred in the area.

Knocknaheeny is part of the Dáil constituency of Cork North-Central.

== Amenities ==
=== Schools ===
Knocknaheeny's primary school is St. Mary's on the Hill, opened in 1981, which admits both boys and girls. In its early years it was granted an extension to deal with the then-large numbers of students. The secondary school is Terence MacSwiney Community College (formerly Scoil Mhic Shuibhne) which also incorporates Gaelcholáiste Mhic Shuibhne, and which had approximately 300 students. It houses, at its western end, a further education college known as Cork College of FET Knocknaheeny Centre.

There has been a presence of Barnardo's children's charity in the area since the early 2000s. The Family Centre that was set up by the local Daughters of Charity, in the area's infancy, has been under the operation of the Health Service Initiative since the early 2000s. The centre runs a pre-school through the high-scope method and a creche. In the late 1970s and 1980s, there was a nursery school operating in Ardmore Avenue, but for various reasons (including lack of a teacher, building unsuitability and lower child population numbers) it had closed.

=== Sport ===
Local soccer teams include Knocknaheeny Celtic, Central Rovers and Grattan United. Other sporting activities involve the Gaelic Athletic Association (GAA) sports hurling and Gaelic football.The St Vincent's Hurling and Football club was founded in 1943 to promote Gaelic games in the Blarney Street and Sunday's Well area, and later expanded to encompass Knocknaheeny, Gurranabraher and Churchfield. The club won the Minor Premier County competition in 1998.

=== Transport ===
Knocknaheeny is served by a number of bus routes, including route 201 (from Mayfield via Knocknaheeny to Cork University Hospital), route 202 (from Knocknaheeny via the city centre and Ballintemple to Mahon) and route 210 to Cork City and Little Island.

=== Water tower ===
Described in the National Inventory of Architectural Heritage as a "striking landmark visible from several points around the city", Knocknaheeny's water tower is a prominent feature in the area. It adjoins the reservoir north of the River Lee and provides water to the areas of Churchfield and Hollyhill as well as Knocknaheeny, doing so since the early 1970s. Originally commissioned by Cork Corporation, it is now owned by Uisce Éireann, the state-owned water company.

== Notable people ==
- Mark Carroll, athlete and running coach
- Denise O'Sullivan, Irish international footballer
- Tomás Mulcahy, inter-county hurler and Gaelic footballer
- James Leonard, co-host of The Two Norries podcast
