= June Litman =

New Zealand journalist (1926–1991)

- Born: June Margaret Allen; 13 March 1926; New Plymouth, New Zealand
- Died: 9 April 1991 (aged 65); New Plymouth, New Zealand
- Occupation: News editor at the Taranaki Herald
- Spouse: Paul Emil Litman (m. 1959; died 1979)

June Margaret Litman (née Allen; 13 March 1926 – 9 April 1991) was a New Zealand journalist. She had a long career working at the Taranaki Herald from 1942 to 1986, including as chief sub-editor and news editor (most likely New Zealand's first woman to hold this role for a daily newspaper).

== Life and career ==
Litman was born in New Plymouth, Taranaki, New Zealand on 13 March 1926, and attended New Plymouth Girls’ High School. She married German intellectual Paul Emil Litman in 1959.

In 1942 Litman began working as a cadet reporter for the Taranaki Herald. She became a sub-editor in 1959, chief sub-editor in 1960 and news editor in 1976, at age 50. Biographer Janet McCallum has said she was "probably the first woman news editor of a daily paper in New Zealand". Her career at the Herald was broken up only by an eighteen-month stint working as a reporter in England in 1949–50.

Litman had a reputation as an editor for having high standards for the quality and accuracy of journalistic writing, and often mentored and trained young journalists. She was said to start work as early as 3:30am. Her successor as editor, George Koea, said her high standards and dedication "made her something of a legend in her time".

On the day of her retirement in 1986, the front page of the Herald included tributes and photographs from her colleagues, including a cartoon by Tom Scott of her in front of a burning rubbish bin. She then ran training courses for sub-editors. Following her death on 9 April 1991, the June Litman Memorial Trust was established by her friends and colleagues to recognise her journalistic legacy and to fund journalist training for young Taranaki writers.
