= Derrick Kennedy =

Irish cricketer (1904–1976)

Personal information
- Full name: Derrick Edward de Vere Kennedy
- Born: 5 June 1904; Dublin, Ireland
- Died: 27 June 1976 (aged 72); Johnstown, Dublin, Ireland
- Batting: Right-handed
- Bowling: Right-arm fast-medium

Domestic team information
- Years: Team
- 1924: Ireland

Career statistics
| Competition | First-class |
|---|---|
| Matches | 2 |
| Runs scored | 23 |
| Batting average | 11.50 |
| 100s/50s | –/– |
| Top score | 15* |
| Balls bowled | 132 |
| Wickets | 1 |
| Bowling average | 89.00 |
| 5 wickets in innings | – |
| 10 wickets in match | – |
| Best bowling | 1/65 |
| Catches/stumpings | 1/– |
- Source: Cricinfo, 30 December 2021

Derrick Edward de Vere Kennedy (5 June 1904 in Dublin, Ireland – 27 June 1976 in County Dublin) was an Irish cricketer. A right-handed batsman and right-arm fast-medium bowler, he played once for the Ireland cricket team, a first-class match against Scotland in July 1924. The previous month, he played a first-class match for Dublin University against Northamptonshire.
