= James Graham (cricketer) =

Irish cricketer

Cricket information
- Batting: Right-handed
- Bowling: Right-arm off spin

International information
- National side: Ireland

Career statistics
Competition	First-class
Matches	6
Runs scored	50
Batting average	4.54
100s/50s	0/0
Top score	12*
Balls bowled	972
Wickets	13
Bowling average	29.92
5 wickets in innings	0
10 wickets in match	0
Best bowling	3/76
Catches/stumpings	3/–
- Source: CricketArchive, 15 November 2022

James Robert Graham (11 August 1906 – 14 January 1942) was an Irish cricketer. A right-handed batsman and right-arm fast-medium bowler, he played seven times for the Ireland cricket team between 1936 and 1939, including six first-class matches.

== Playing career ==
He made his debut for Ireland against Scotland in June 1936 in a first-class match. He scored 12 not out in the Irish first innings and took 3/76 in the Scotland first innings. Both these performances are his best for Ireland. The following month, he played against India in his only non-first-class match for Ireland. He also played against the MCC in 1936.

He played once for Ireland in 1937 against the Minor Counties combined side. He played twice in 1938 against Scotland and the MCC, and once in 1939 against Scotland, which was his last game for Ireland.

== Statistics ==
In all matches for Ireland, he scored fifty runs at an average of 4.17 and took 14 wickets at an average of 30.21.
