= Chloe Early =

London-based contemporary artist

- Born: 1980 (age 45–46)
- Known for: Contemporary Art
- Website: http://chloeearly.com/ce_flash.php

Chloe Early is London-based contemporary artist, known for her figurative paintings with street art influences.

== Early life and education ==
Early was born in 1980 and raised in Cork, Ireland. She was a student in printed textiles at the National College of Art and Design in Dublin, where she graduated in 2003. Early married artist Conor Harrington in 2013 after a decade together.

== Style ==
Early commonly works in oils on linen and aluminum panel. Her work captures the drama and emotion of Renaissance and early Baroque artwork. The tropes draw from historical work plays a clear role in her series "Suspended," partly inspired by Gian Lorenzo Bernini’s sculpture, The Ecstasy of Saint Theresa. Her work combines stylistic elements from Renaissance and Romantic painting with the rawness of contemporary life, “examining the sensitive and personal aspects of conflict, ambition and entropy in an opulent, cinematic style.” Common themes include redemption and hope.

== Career ==
Early has exhibited in group and solo shows in London, Los Angeles, Miami, New York, Cork and Dublin.

The music video for the song Iris (Hold Me Close) by U2 exhibits a coming of age story by Early. The artist contrasts concrete urbanism with lush landscapes, drawing from her childhood in Ireland and her impending motherhood.

== Exhibitions ==
April 2014	Suspended/The Outsiders/London
November 2012	Rainbow Ruins / Corey Helford Gallery / Los Angeles
October 2011	Feathers and Wax / Joshua Liner Gallery / New York
October 2010	Birdsong and Machine Sounds / Corey Helford Gallery / Los Angeles
November 2008	Ladies and Gentlemen we are Spinning in Space / Stolen Space Gallery / London
February 2008	Pieces of A Dream / Tramyard Gallery / Dublin
May 2007	Between Earth and Heaven / Stolen Space Gallery / London
October 2006	Springboard / Tramyard Gallery / Dublin
=== Group exhibitions ===
March 2016	Still Here: A Decade of Lazarides / Lazarides Gallery / London
May 2014	Art Truancy: 20 Years of Juxtapoz Magazine / Jonathan LeVine Gallery / New York
December 2010, 2011, 2012	Space Miami / Corey Helford Gallery
December 2009	Multi-Plane Group Show / Corey Helford Gallery / Los Angeles
August 2009	Summer Group Show / Joshua Liner Gallery / New York
July 2009, 2010	Summer Group Show / Stolen Space / London
April 2009	Chasing Castles / Kinsey Desforges Gallery / Los Angeles

– Sources:
