= William Henry John Seffern =

New Zealand printer, newspaper editor, journalist, and historian

William Henry John Seffern (1829–1900) was a New Zealand printer, newspaper editor, journalist and historian. Born in County Cork, Ireland in 1829, he emigrated to Australia before moving to Auckland, New Zealand in the 1850s. As of the mid-1860s, Seffern he was the manager and later proprietor of the Auckland newspaper, the New-Zealander. In 1868 he became the manager and editor of the Taranaki Herald. He wrote a number of works on the history of Taranaki in the 1880s and 1890s. He retired from the Taranaki Herald in 1895, and died in New Plymouth in October 1900.
