= Cúchulainns =

- Founded: 1934
- County: Dublin
- Colours: Blue
- Grounds: Phoenix Park
Standard
colours

Senior Club Championships
	All Ireland	Leinster champions	Dublin champions
Camogie:	0	[[Leinster Senior Club Camogie Championship|0]]	0

Cuchulainns is a camogie club that participated in the foundation of the game of camogie in 1904. Cuchulainns wore a navy gym tunic with a dark blue and white checked blouse.
