= Camogie =

Irish stick-and-ball female team sport

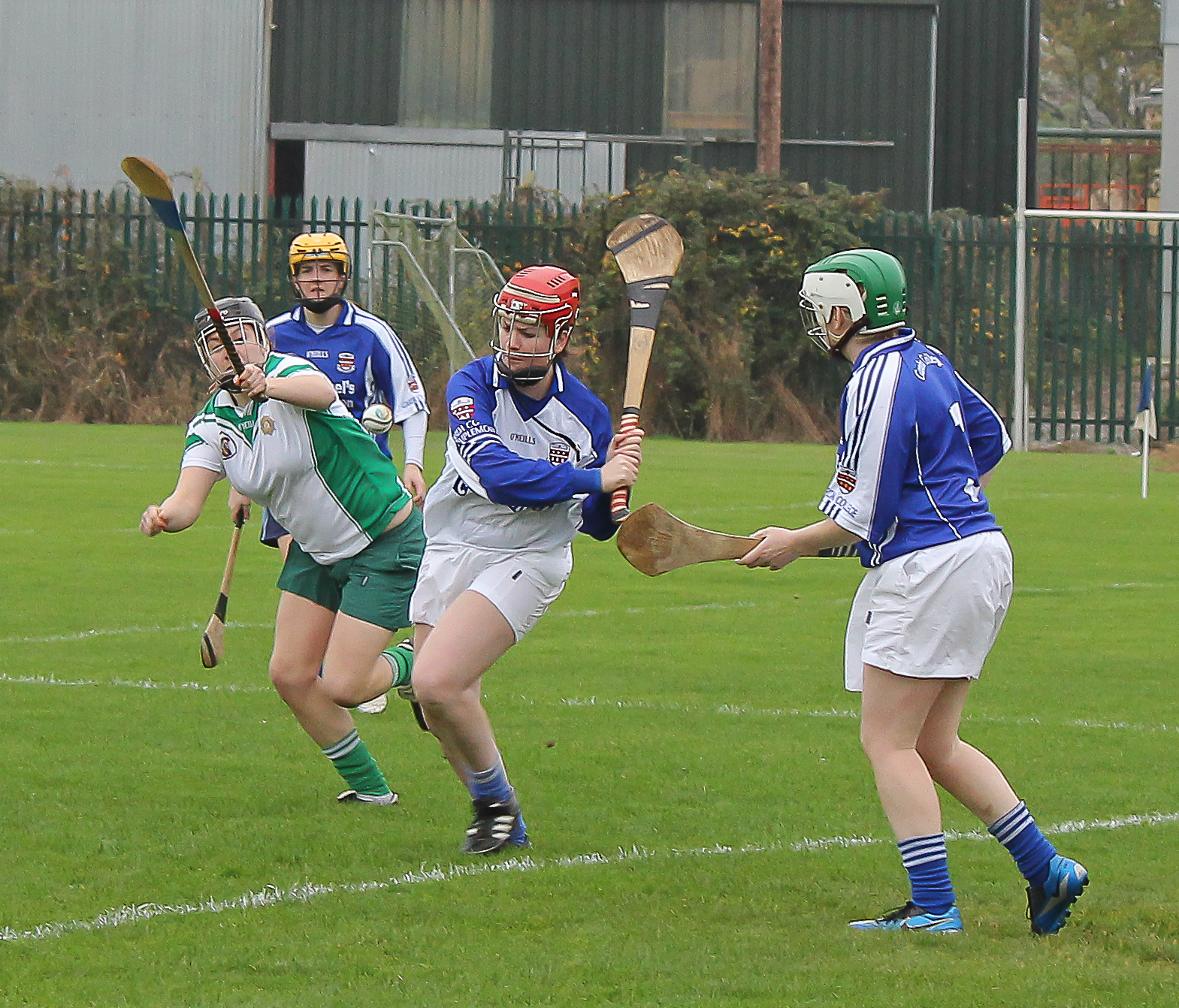
- Garda vs Defence Forces match in 2012
- Highest governing body: Camogie Association
- First played: 1904; 122 years ago: Ireland
- Registered players: Over 100,000
- Clubs: 536

Characteristics
- Contact: Contact
- Team members: 15 players per side, substitutes are permitted
- Type: Female; Team sport; Ball sport; Some mixed-sex teams available
- Equipment: Sliotar (ball); Hurley/camán (stick); Helmet; Shin guards

Camogie (/kəˈmoʊɡi/ kə-MOH-ghee; Irish: camógaíocht [kəˈmˠoːɡiːxt̪ˠ]) is an Irish stick-and-ball team sport played by women. It is played by 100,000 women in Ireland and worldwide, largely among Irish communities.

A variant of the game hurling (which is played by men only), it is organised by the Dublin-based Camogie Association (An Cumann Camógaíochta). There is an annual All Ireland Camogie Championship.

== Game and rules ==
Each team has 15 players on the field. Within the 15 players the team must consist of one goalkeeper, three full back players, three half back players, two centre-field players, three half forward players and three full forward players. There is a minimum requirement of twelve players on the pitch at all times. The rules are almost identical to hurling, with a few exceptions.

- Goalkeepers wear the same colours as outfield players. This is because no special rules apply to the goalkeeper, and so there is no need for officials to differentiate between goalkeeper and outfielders.
- A camogie player can hand-pass a point over the bar from play. Hand-passing involves throwing the sliotar into the air and hitting it with the palm of the hand. Hand-passing into the goal has been forbidden in camogie since 2021, having earlier been outlawed in hurling since 1980.
- Camogie games last 60 minutes, divided into two halves of 30 minutes each (senior inter-county hurling games last for a period of 70 minutes, which is divided into two halves of 35 minutes each). Ties are resolved by multiple 2×10-minute sudden death periods of extra time; in these, the first team to score wins (ties are not resolved using this method in hurling).
- A smaller sliotar (ball) is used in camogie – commonly known as a size 4 sliotar – whereas hurlers play with a size 5 sliotar.
- If a defending player hits the sliotar wide, a 45-metre puck (free shot) is awarded to the opposition (in hurling, he must perform a 65-metre puck).
- After a score, the goalkeeper pucks out from the 13-metre line (in hurling, he must puck from the end line).
- The metal band on the camogie stick must be covered with tape (not necessary in hurling).
- Side-to-side charges are forbidden (permitted in hurling).
- Two points are awarded for a score direct from a sideline cut (since March 2012).
- Players previously had to wear skirts or skorts rather than shorts, but can now choose to wear skirts, skorts or shorts.

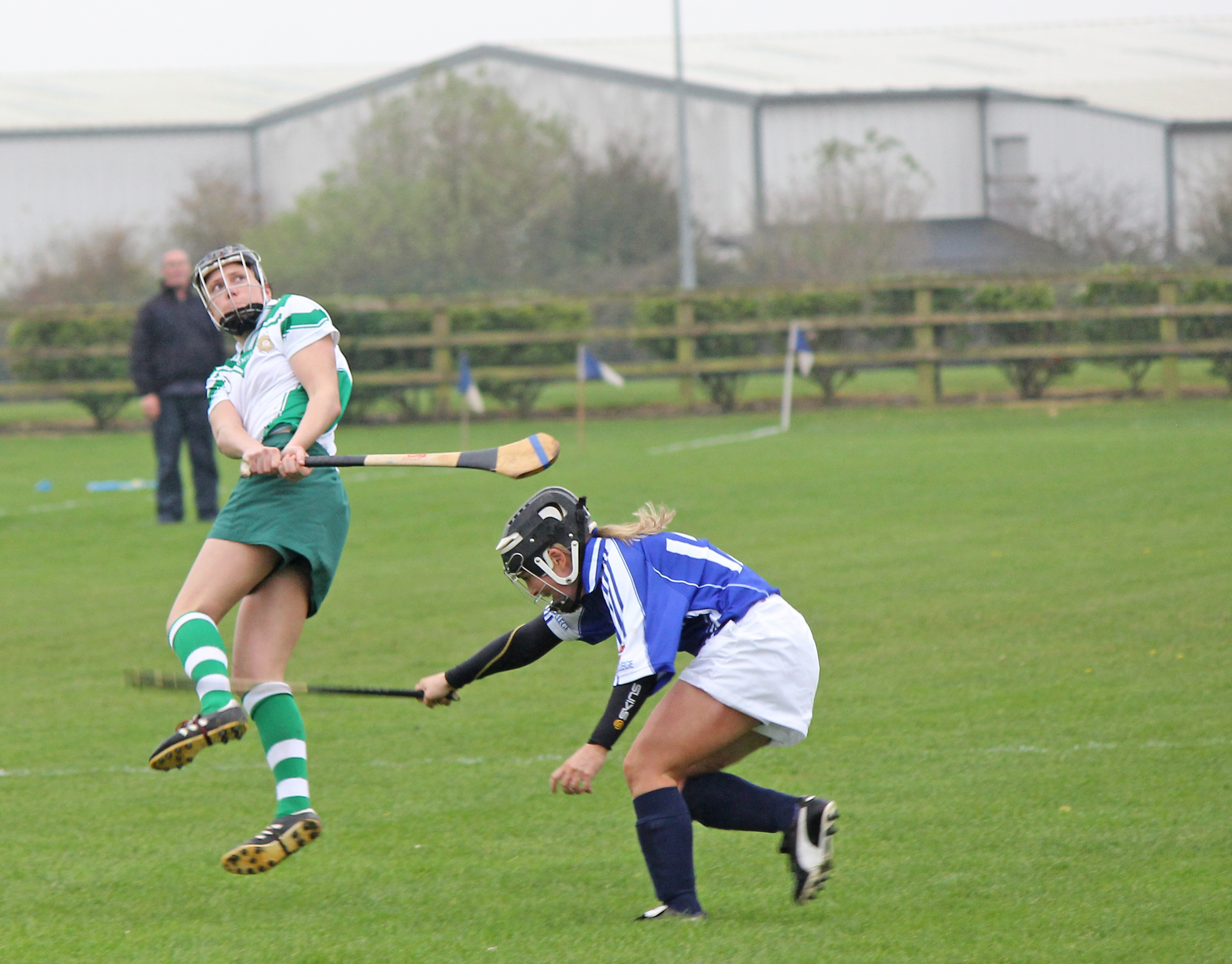
A camogie match in action

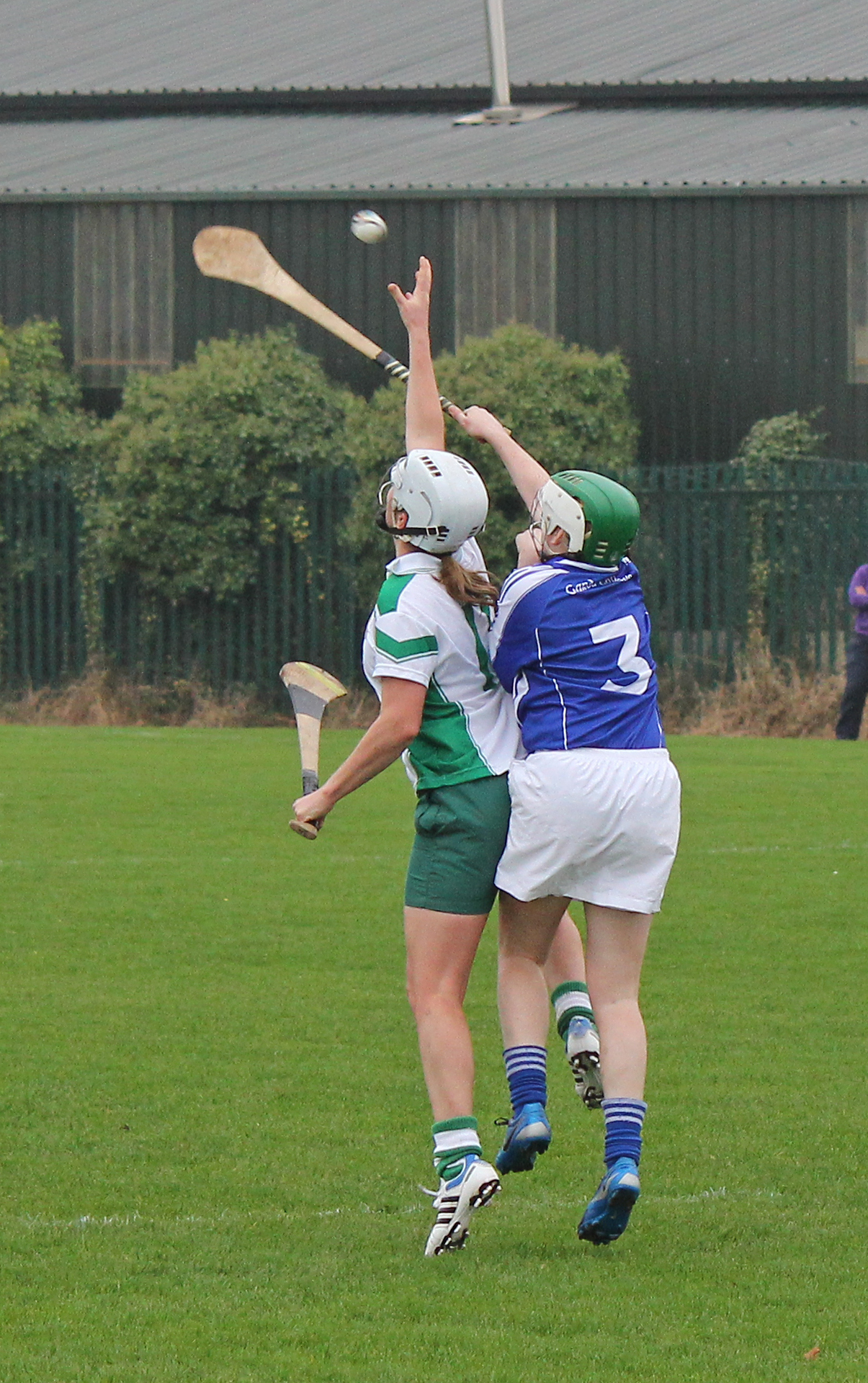
Players may catch the ball with their hand

Under the original 1903 rules both the match and the field were shorter than their hurling equivalents. Matches were 40 minutes, increased to 50 minutes in 1934, and playing fields 125–130 yards (114–119 m) long and 65–70 yards (59–64 m) wide. From 1929 until 1979 a second crossbar, a "points bar" was also used, meaning that a point would not be allowed if it travelled over this bar, a somewhat contentious rule through the 75 years it was in use. Teams were regulated at 12 a side, using an elliptical formation, although it was more a "squeezed lemon" formation with the three midfield players grouped more closely together than their counterpart on the half back and half-forward lines. In 1999 camogie moved to the Gaelic Athletic Association (GAA) field-size and 15-a-side, adopting the standard GAA butterfly formation.

=== Field and equipment ===
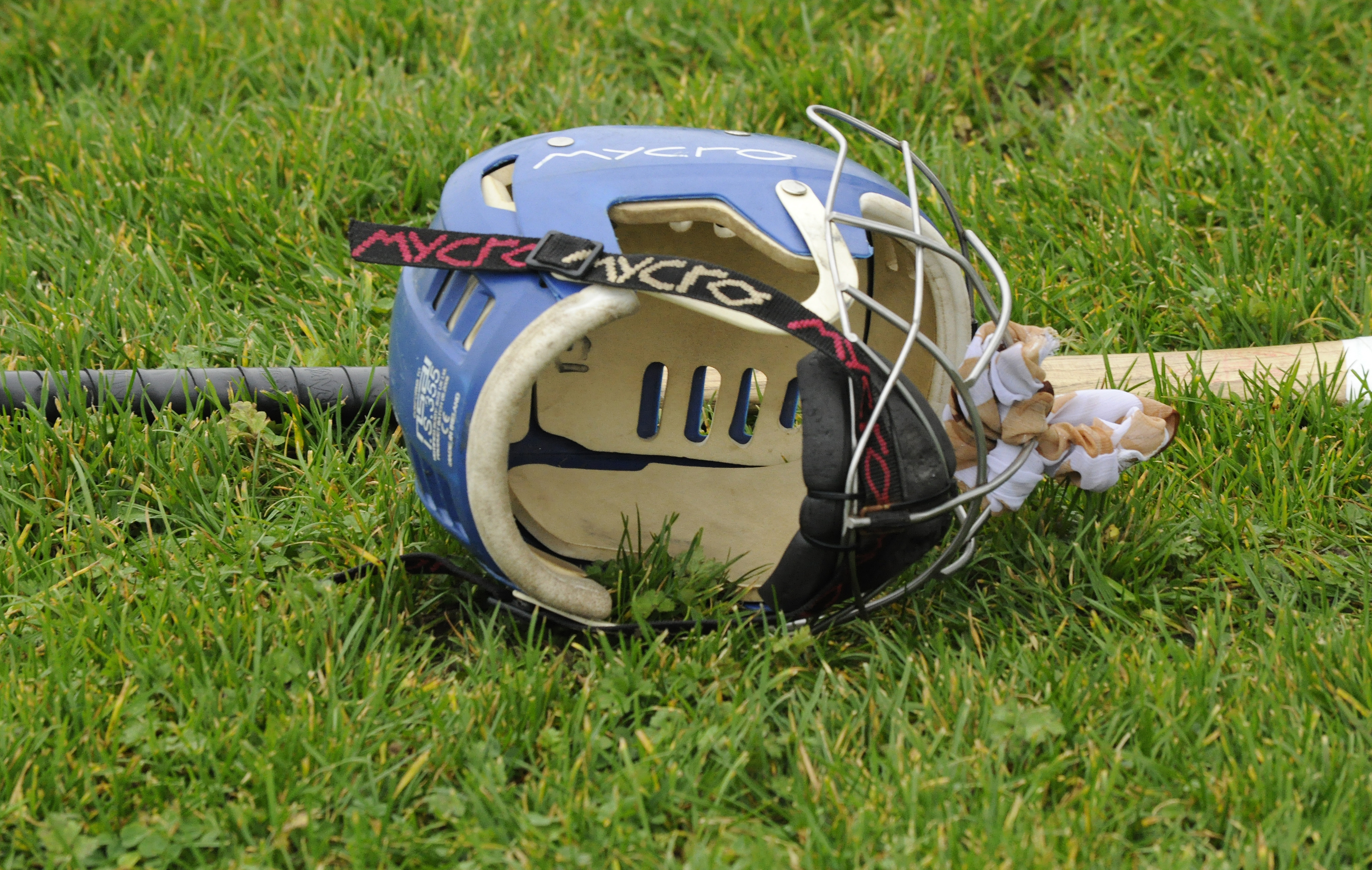
A camogie helmet lies beside a hurley

==== Field ====
The field is not of a fixed size, but must be 130 to 145 metres (142 to 159 yd) long by 80 to 90 metres (87 to 98 yd) wide.

==== Sticks ====
The length of the stick, called a "hurley", varies depending on the player's height.

=== Goals and scoring ===
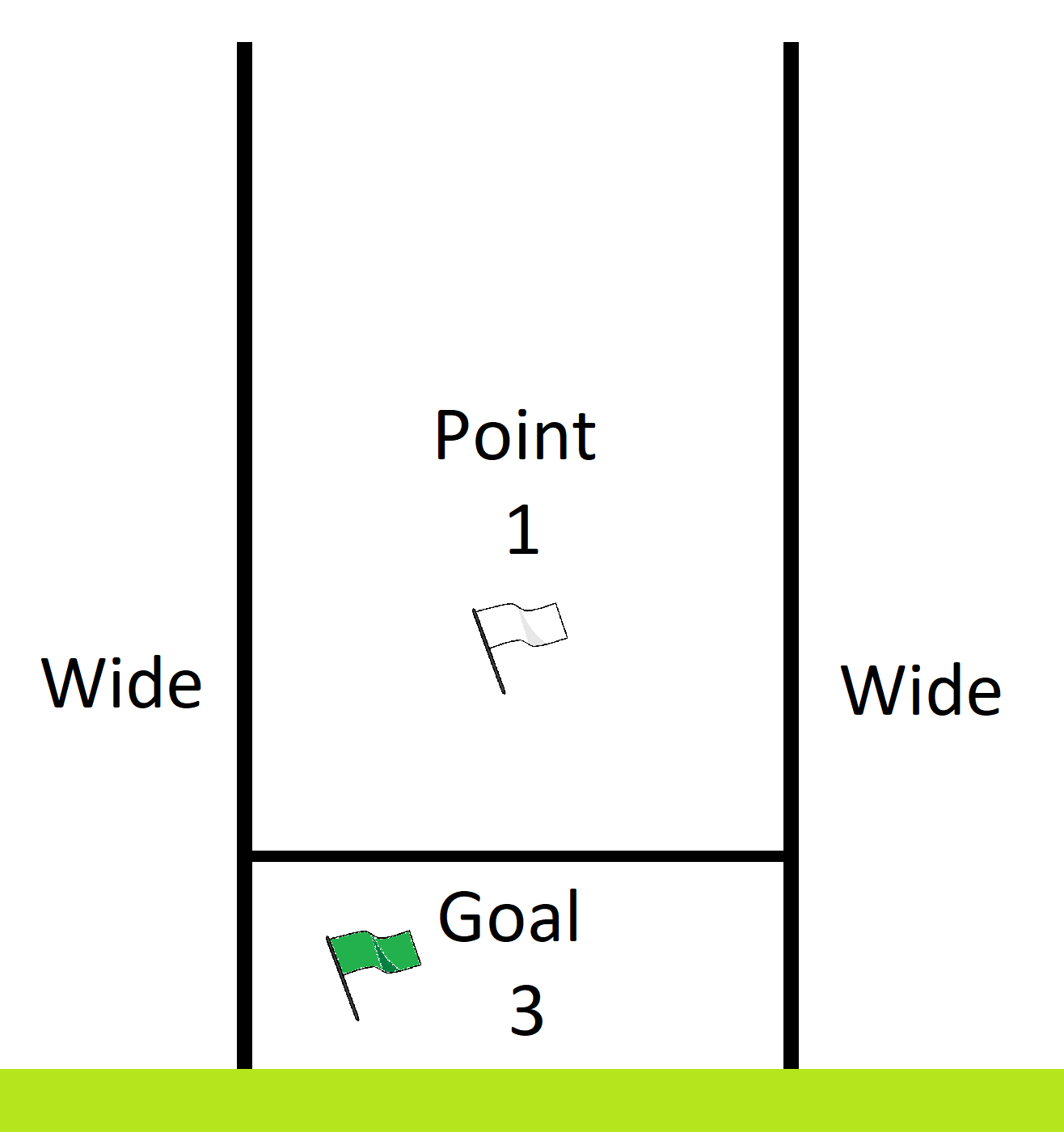
Goalposts and scoring system used in camogie

H-shaped goals are used. A team achieves a score by making the ball go between the posts. If the ball goes over the bar for a "point", the team earns one point. If the ball goes under the bar for a "goal", the team earns three points.

== History ==
=== Foundation ===
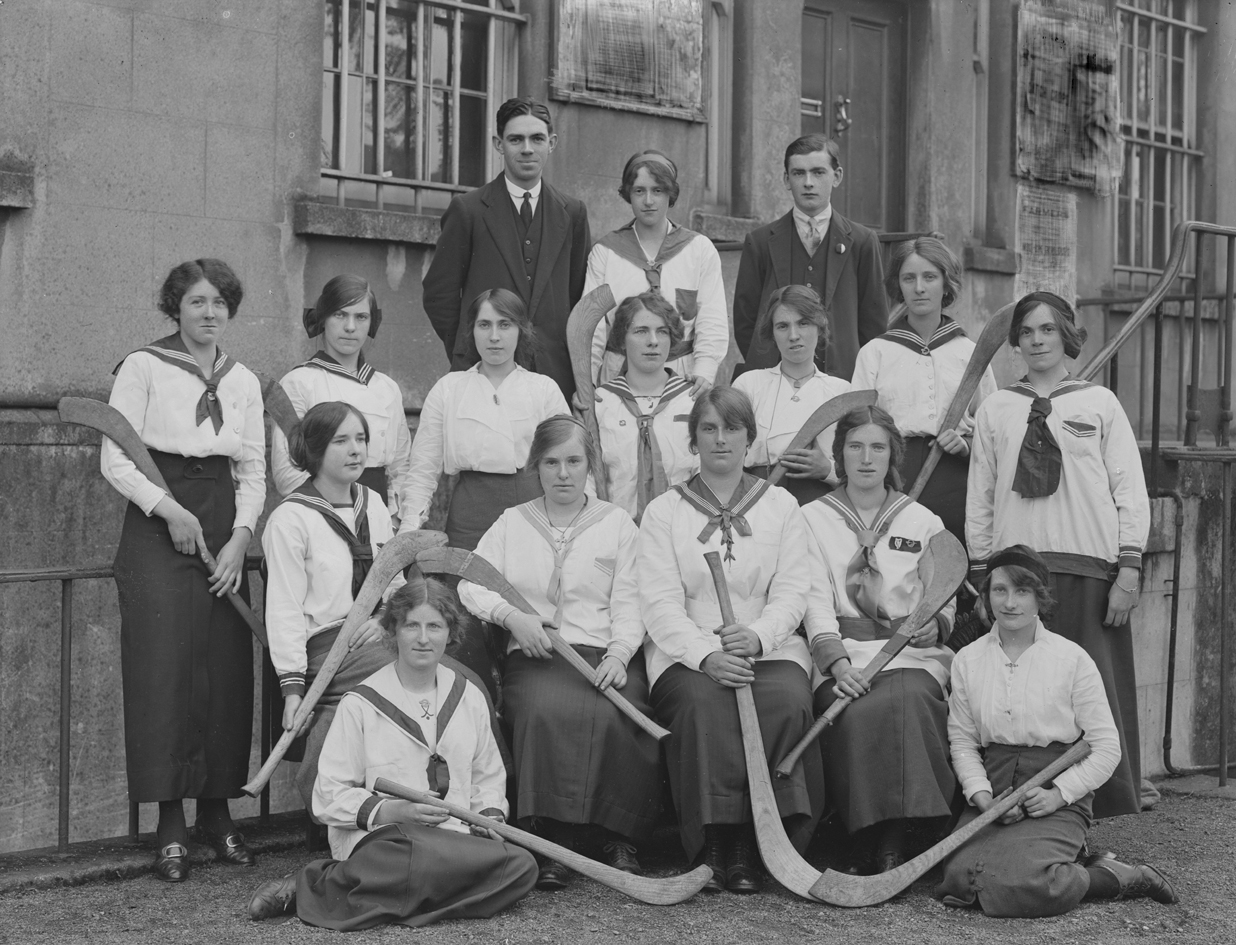
A camogie team pictured in Waterford in October 1915

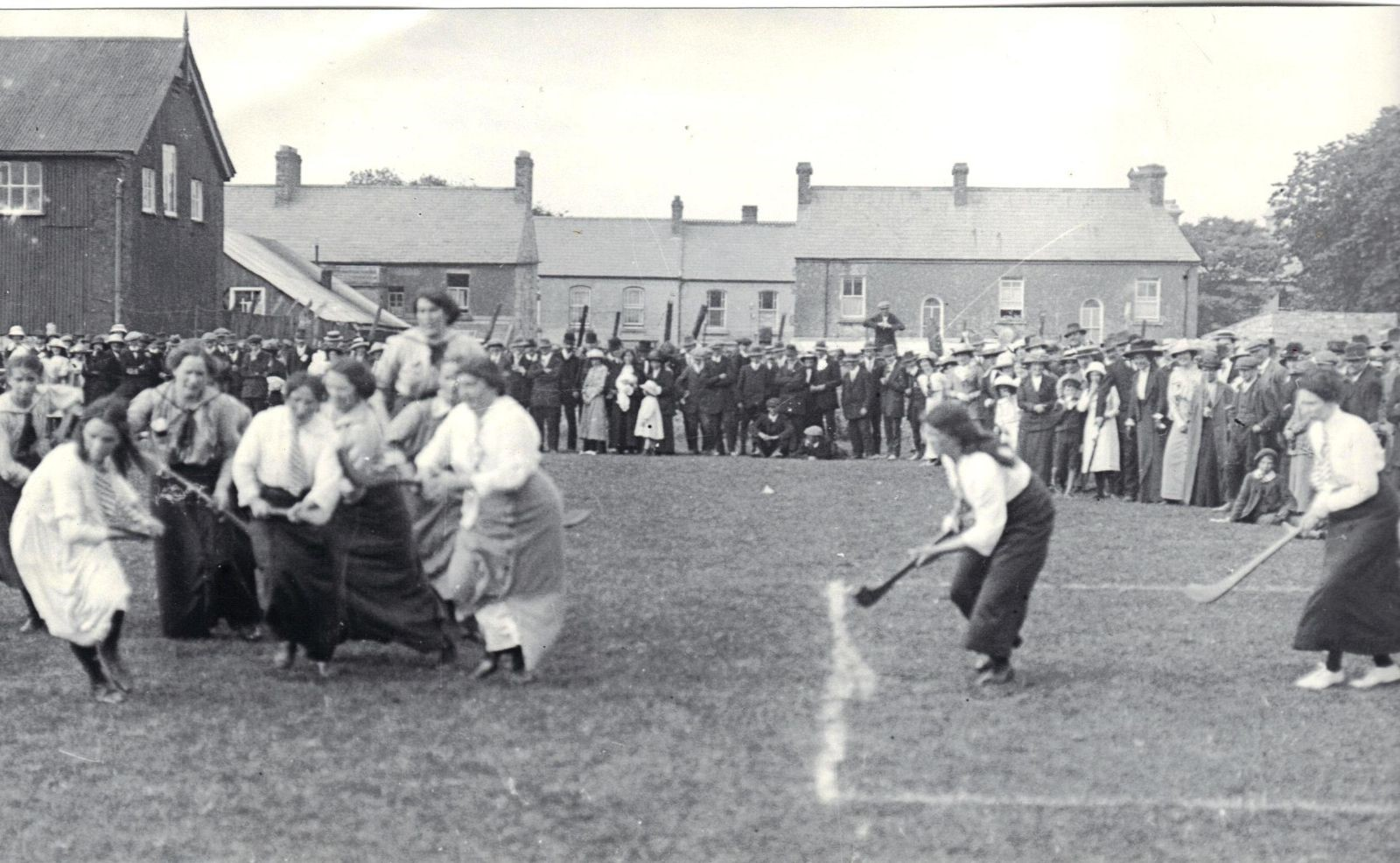
A camogie game in 1934

The name was invented by Tadhg Ua Donnchadha (Tórna) at meetings in 1903 in advance of the first matches in 1904. The term camogie is derived from the name of the stick used in the game. Men play hurling using a curved stick called a camán in Irish. Women in the early camogie games used a shorter stick described by the diminutive form camóg. The suffix – aíocht (originally "uidheacht") – was added to both words to give names for the sports: camánaíocht (which became iománaíocht) and camógaíocht. When the Gaelic Athletic Association was founded in 1884 the English-origin name "hurling" was given to the men's game. When an organisation for women was set up in 1904, it was decided to anglicise the Irish name camógaíocht to camogie.

The experimental rules were drawn up for the female game by Máire Ní Chinnéide, Seán (Sceilg) Ó Ceallaigh, Tadhg Ó Donnchadha and Séamus Ó Braonáin. The Official Launch of Camogie took place with the first public match between Craobh an Chéitinnigh (Keatings branch of the Gaelic League) and Cúchulainns on 17 July at a Feis in Navan. The sport's governing body, the Camogie Association or An Cumann Camógaíochta, was founded in 1905 and re-constituted in 1911, 1923 and 1939. Until June 2010 it was known as Cumann Camógaíochta na nGael.

Máire Ní Chinnéide and Cáit Ní Dhonnchadha, two prominent Irish-language enthusiasts and cultural nationalists, were credited with having created the sport, with the assistance of Ní Dhonnchadha's scholarly brother Tadhg Ó Donnchadha, who drew up its rules. Thus, although camogie was founded by women, and independently run (although closely linked to the GAA), there was, from the outset, a small yet powerful male presence within its administrative ranks. It was no surprise that camogie emanated from the Gaelic League, nor that it would be dependent upon the structures and networks provided by that organisation during the initial expansion of the sport. Of all the cultural nationalist organisations for adults that emerged during the fin de siècle, the Gaelic League was the only one to accept female and male members on an equal footing. Nonetheless, the creation of camogie was not universally supported - even by women - with leading figures such as president of the Irish Countrywomen's Association and Conradh na Gaeilge member, Kit Ahern (despite her support of GAA clubs for men) describing camogie as "too strenuous for girls".

The first All Ireland Championship was played in 1932. The championship was initially dominated by Dublin with occasional interludes from Cork and Antrim. In the late 1960s and 1970s the dominance of Dublin ended and Wexford and Kilkenny joined as champions. Since the late 1990s also Tipperary and Galway have won several championships.

In 1964 the first All Ireland Club Championship was played.

== Clubs ==
An Cumann Camógaíochta has a similar structure to the Gaelic Athletic Association, with an Annual Congress every spring which decides on policy and major issues such as rule changes, and an executive council—the Ard Chomhairle—which deals with short-term issues and governance. The game is administered from a headquarters in Croke Park in Dublin. Each county boards takes control of its own affairs, with the number of clubs ranging from 63 in Cork to one in Leitrim. There are several provincial councils and affiliates in Asia, Australia, Britain, Europe, New York, New Zealand and North America.

=== Ireland ===
In October 2023 there were approximately 618 clubs with 118,000 members in Ireland which includes non-active members.

=== Overseas ===
- Europe
- (United Kingdom) London
- Canada
- United States
- (Australia) Australasia

== Competitions in Ireland ==
=== All-Ireland Championship ===
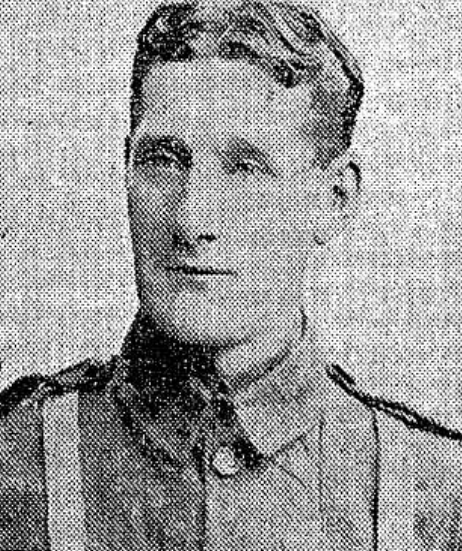
The O'Duffy Cup, named after Seán O'Duffy, is the prize presented to the winners of the All-Ireland Senior Camogie Championship

The county is the unit of structure in elite competition, responsible for organising club competitions within the county unit and for fielding inter-county teams in the various grades of the All-Ireland championships and National Camogie League. The All Ireland Club Championship is staged at Senior, Intermediate and Junior level, usually reaching the final stages in November–December or the following March.

The top 10 Counties compete for the elite All-Ireland Senior Camogie Championship in which the O'Duffy Cup is awarded. The All-Ireland Final is held every year in Croke Park during September, usually on the week between the hurling final and Gaelic football final, and attracts attendances of up to 33,000.

The subsequent 8 counties compete for the Intermediate Championship.

In 2026 6 counties competed in the third-tier Premier Junior Championship and 4 teams the fourth-tier Junior championship.

There are age-graded All Ireland championships at Minor A, Minor B, and Minor C, and Under-16 A, B and C level.

=== National League ===
The National League is staged during the winter-spring months, with four divisions of team graded by ability.

=== Provincial championships ===
Provincial championships take place at all levels, independent of the All Ireland series which has been run on an open draw basis since 1973.

=== International and inter-provincial ===
Ireland plays a camogie-shinty international against Scotland each year. The Gael Linn Cup is an inter-provincial competition played at senior and junior level. The sport is closely associated with the Celtic Congress. Two former Camogie Association presidents Máire Ní Chinnéide and Agnes O'Farrelly were also presidents of Celtic Congress and exhibition matches have been held at the Celtic Congress since 1938. The first such exhibition match, on the Isle of Man in 1938, marked the first appearance of Kathleen Cody, who became one of the stars of the 1940s.

=== Inter-collegiate ===
The Ashbourne and Purcell Cups and Father Meachair seven-a-side are the principal inter-collegiate competitions.

=== Schools ===
There is also a programme of provincial and All Ireland championships at secondary schools senior and junior levels, differentiated by the years of secondary school cycle, with years 4–6 competing in the senior competition, and years 1–3 competing at junior level. Cumann na mBunscoil organises competitions at primary school level.

=== Féile na nGael ===
Camogie competitions for club teams featuring under-14 players are played in four divisions as part of the annual Féile na nGael festival. The county that is selected for a particular year, all their clubs host teams from all around the country representing their county. Host clubs get families to take in two or three children for a couple of days.

== International presence ==
Though camogie is played predominantly in its native homeland of Ireland, it has spread to other countries, largely among the Irish diaspora due to immigrants and the immigrant population. The sport is known to have arrived in places in such as Great Britain, North America, Europe, Australia, New Zealand, South Africa and Argentina. Southeast Asia has teams in Vietnam, Thailand, and Kuala Lumpur. In North America camogie is played in the United States, Canada, and in parts of the Caribbean. Camogie has also been included as a part of the GAA World Games.

=== North American presence ===
Camogie teams in North America have existed for at least a century.

=== United States ===
The national organizing body for Gaelic Games in the United States, with the exception of New York City, is the USGAA where camogie can be found. It is the governing body which promotes camogie in the United States along with other Gaelic sports. The USGAA also maintains a close relationship with other GAA groups in North America including Canada (Gaelic Games Canada), the New York GAA, and the Caribbean.

The United States has sent a number of camogie teams from the US to compete in the GAA World Games.

=== Canada ===
The national organizing body for Gaelic Games in Canada is Gaelic Games Canada (GGC) a.k.a. Canadian GAA (CGAA) where camogie can be found. Canada and the CGAA are home to a number of camogie clubs.

Canada has sent a number of camogie teams from Canada to compete in the GAA World Games.

== Cultural presence ==
UNESCO lists Camogie as an element of Intangible Cultural Heritage.

The Game is referred to in Waiting for Godot by Irish playwright Samuel Beckett and in 'Fair Play' a detective novel by Irish author Louise Hegarty.

== Records ==
=== Ireland ===
==== All-Ireland Senior Camogie Championship ====
Cork have won the most Camogie All-Ireland, winning their 31st championship in 2026.

The final in 2026 also set a new record high attendance of 33,419.

==== National Camogie League titles ====
Cork have won the most National Camogie League titles with 17.

== Awards ==
Camogie All Stars Awards are awarded annually to the elite players who have performed best in each of the 15 positions on a traditional camogie team. Player of the year and other achievement awards have also been awarded to leading players for several decades.

=== Team of the Century ===
Picked in 2004

1. Eileen Duffy-O'Mahony (Dublin)
2. Liz Neary (Kilkenny)
3. Marie Costine-O'Donovan (Cork)
4. Mary Sinnott-Dinan (Wexford)
5. Bridie Martin-McGarry (Kilkenny)
6. Sandie Fitzgibbon (Cork)
7. Margaret O'Leary-Leacy (Wexford)
8. Mairéad McAtamney-Magill (Antrim)
9. Linda Mellerick (Cork)
10. Sophie Brack (Dublin)
11. Kathleen Mills-Hill (Dublin)
12. Joni Traynor (Kilkenny)
13. Úna O'Connor (Dublin)
14. Pat Moloney-Lenihan (Cork)
15. Deirdre Hughes (Tipperary)
16. Angela Downey-Browne (Kilkenny)

== See also ==
- Ashbourne Cup
- Camogie All Stars Awards
- Poc Fada
- Women's shinty
- Field hockey
- Bando (sport)
- Shinty
- Hurling
- Lacrosse
