= The Two Norries =

Health and wellness podcast

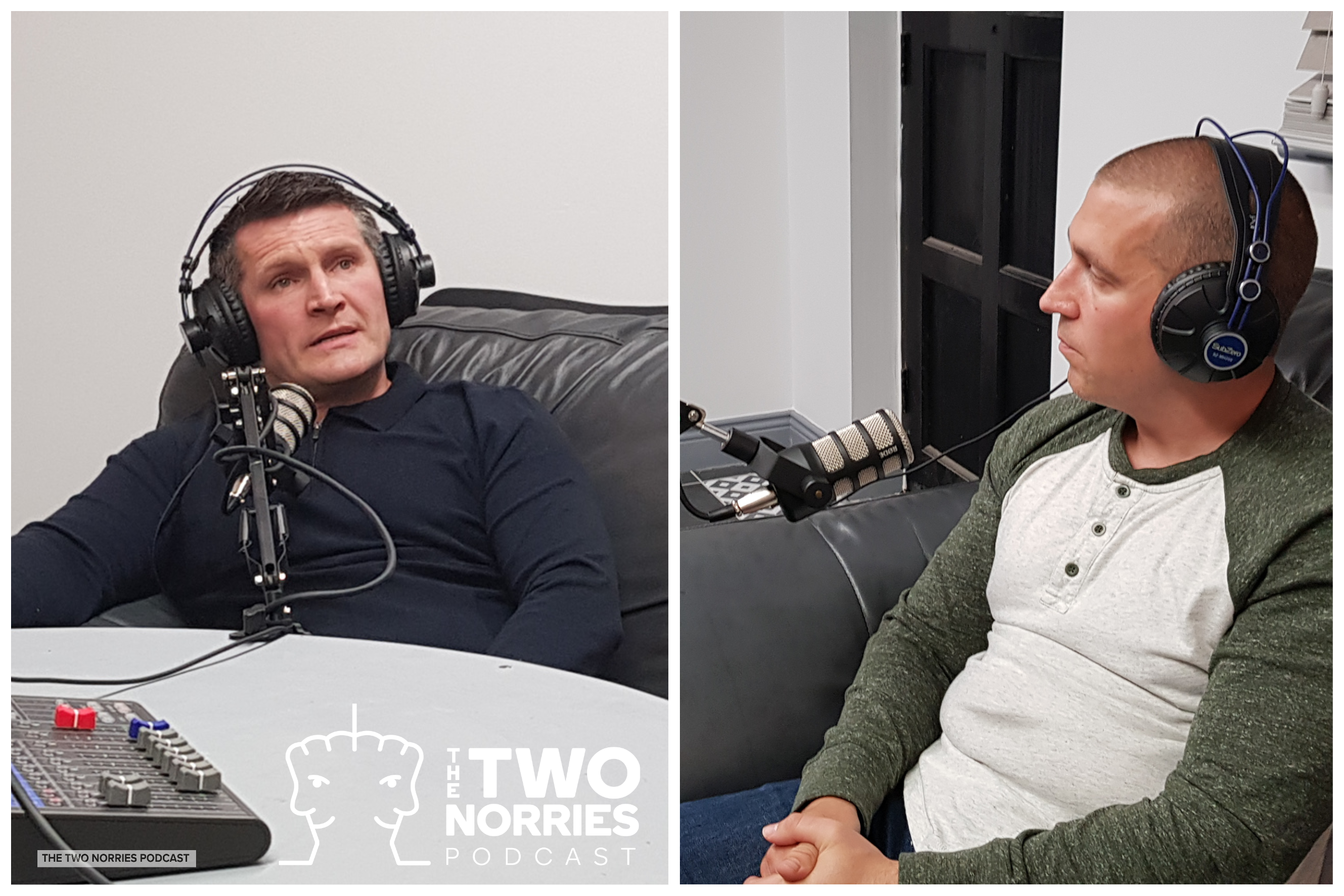

Presentation
- Hosted by: James Leonard; Timmy Long
- Genre: Trauma, addiction, recovery, education
- Language: English

Publication
- Original release: 29 June 2020 – January 2024

The Two Norries was a weekly podcast hosted by Timmy Long and James Leonard that focused on trauma, mental health, addiction, prison systems, recovery and access to education. The podcast series was recorded and released between June 2020 and January 2024.

The podcast in part resulted from Leonard's January 2020 interview on the Saturday night Tommy Tiernan Show broadcast on RTÉ Television. The podcast's title is an pun on 1980s comedy duo The Two Ronnies; both hosts are from the working class suburbs in the Churchfield, Hollyhill and Knocknaheeny areas of the north-side of Cork city, and Norry is a colloquial, often derogatory, word for Cork city north-siders.

The Two Norries podcast ended in January 2024.

== Origins and format ==
James Leonard made national headlines in January 2020 when, as a former heroin addict now holding a Master's degree in criminology, he gave an extended interview with Tommy Tiernan on the national broadcaster channel RTÉ One. The slot was widely and supportively commented upon by national media, to the extent that someone from the office of the Irish President Michael D. Higgins contacted Leonard. Reflecting on the coverage, Leonard said despite being reluctant to appear, fearing he would be forever and thereafter branded as just an addict, he went ahead as he had "a feeling that my story would resonate with people, but I had no idea of the scale of it".

The podcast, which was broadcast weekly, featured interviews with recovering Irish sport-stars, musicians and comedians, as well as a cancer patient, a therapist, a psychologist, a prison governor and a doctor commenting on the availability of prescription barbiturates in Cork's northside during the 1990s and 2000s.

== Hosts ==
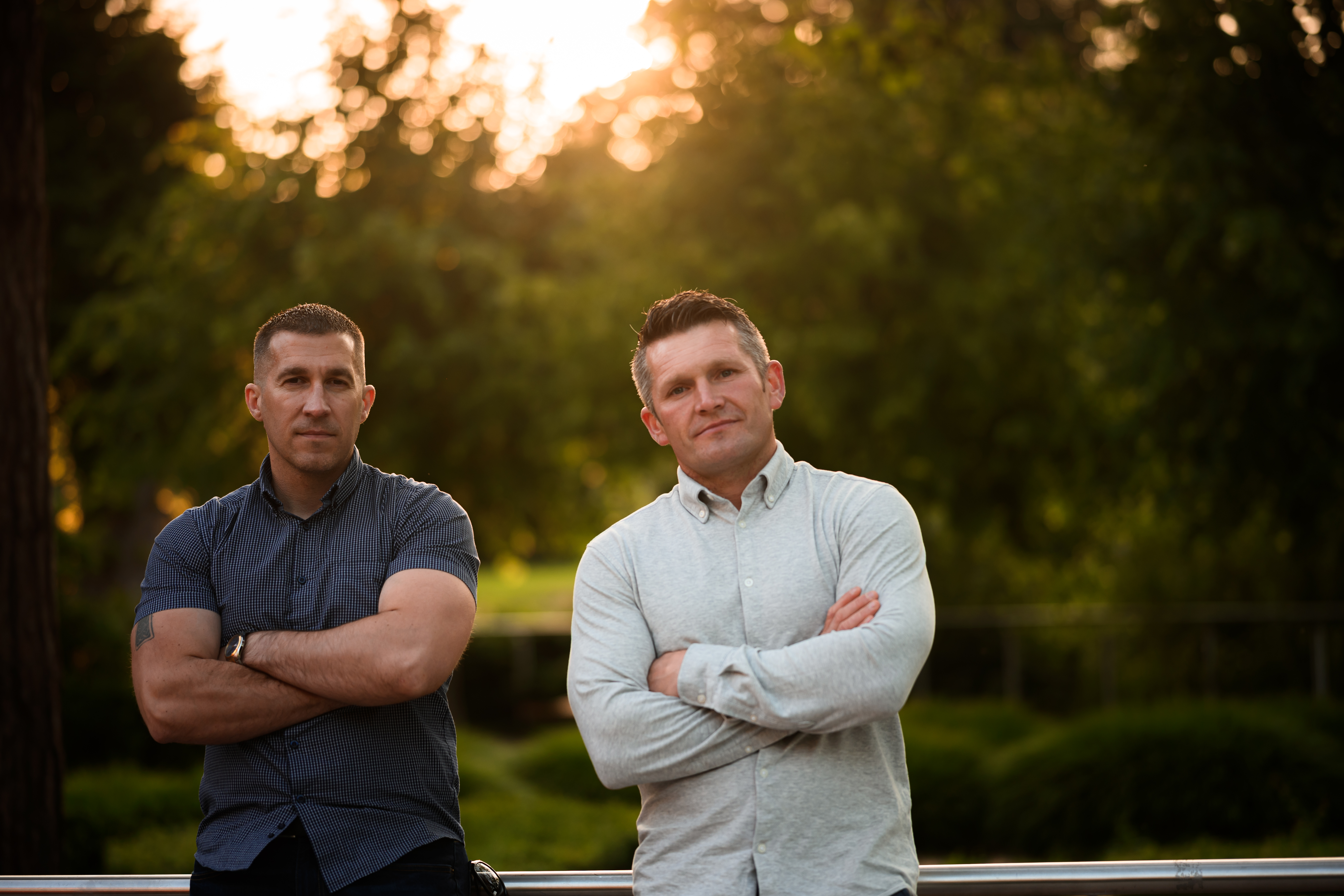
James Leonard and Timmy Long

The hosts James Leonard and Timmy Long, aged 35 and 40 respectively as of 2021, were previously addicted to drugs which led them to prison and institutional care, but both have been in recovery since the early 2010s. Through their organising of education and community support for other addicts in Cork and Ireland, and the launch of their the podcast in the summer of 2020, they gained widespread attention.

=== Timmy Long ===
Long said that as a young teenager in the 1990s he was dealing pills at the "Sweat" nights at Sir Henry's but had been "an alcoholic before I touched any drug. When I was young I'd drink seven nights a week, then it was ecstasy for years, then tablets, then drink again, and then heroin came into my life. That was the end of it all. It completely robbed my soul. It took over my entire life, my thinking." Long has severe dyslexia which went undiagnosed until after his recovery. He said that for years "pictures were my understanding of what was going on. In a newspaper, I'd be able to read, maybe, the headline."

Long completed his Leaving Cert while in prison, after which he enrolled at St. John's Central College, Cork. Long graduated from Cork Institute of Technology in January 2021 with an honours degree in construction management. Of his own and his brother's recoveries, he admits that he is "glad that we reached our rock bottom. For many of our friends that died, their rock bottom was a box. We live for them and want to show others that there is a way back."

=== James Leonard ===
Leonard was raised in Knocknaheeny, which he describes as "probably the most deprived area in Cork". He in part ascribes his spiral into heroin addiction due to his father being in prison during his childhood. Leonard's break with drugs and intermittent homelessness came after an overdose where he was found by two Garda Síochána (Irish police). He explains that "at that stage I was looking for a way out, and that way was death. When these Guards – who I didn't have a great relationship with by the way – showed me compassion and empathy, it really struck a chord with me. The next day, I rang to get on a list for a treatment centre."

As of March 2021, Leonard was working towards a PhD in criminology at University College Cork (UCC), having already achieved a Bachelor of Arts and Master's degree in the subject. He says of his former view of the college: "You could walk to UCC in about fifteen minutes from my house, but it may as well have been a million miles away". Reflecting on the poverty gap in Ireland he said: "I had no stake in my own education [as a teenager]. CAO points, never heard of them...all this was never on my radar, so college was never given a second thought".
