= Jack Lawrence (cricketer) =

Irish cricketer (1904–1984)

Personal information
- Full name: John Fortune Lawrence
- Born: 9 September 1904; Dublin, Ireland
- Died: 13 August 1984 (aged 79); Eastbourne, Sussex, England
- Batting: Right-handed

Domestic team information
- Years: Team
- 1926: Dublin University

Career statistics
Competition	First-class
Matches	1
Runs scored	7
Batting average	3.50
100s/50s	–/–
Top score	6
Catches/stumpings	–/–
- Source: Cricinfo, 2 January 2022

John Fortune Lawrence (9 September 1904 – 13 August 1984) was an Irish cricketer.

== Biography ==
Jack Lawrence was born John Fortune Lawrence in Dublin, Ireland on 9 September 1904. A right-handed batsman, he played one first-class cricket match for Dublin University against Northamptonshire in June 1926. Lawrence died on 13 August 1984, in Eastbourne, Sussex, England.
