= Steven Cairns =

Irish Boxer

Personal information
- Nickname: The Irish Takeover
- Nationality: Irish
- Born: Steven Cairns Cork, Ireland (Aged 21)
- Height: 5 ft 10 in / 178cm

Boxing career
- Weight class: Super Feather
- Stance: Orthodox

Boxing record
- Total fights: 7
- Wins: 7
- Win by KO: 4
Medal record
Representing (Republic of Ireland)
European Youth Championships
Silver medal – second place	2018	{{{2}}}

Steven Cairns is an Irish professional boxer. As an amateur, he won 7 National Irish Titles and won silver in the 2015 European Youth Championships in Russia.

== Amateur record ==
As an amateur, Steven compiled a record of 110 fights and 101 wins. He represented Ireland at the 2015 European Youth Championships, winning a silver medal.

== Professional career ==
Steven made his professional debut on 5 June 2021, winning a unanimous decision against Rafael Castillo. He signed a promotional deal with Probellum and is currently trained by David Coldwell.

Steven's fought Jose Hernadez in the Liverpool Arena on the 22nd of April 2022. He won by technical knockout (TKO) in the first round.

Steven signed a new promotional deal with Frank Warren's Queensbury Promotions in February 2024 and is targeting big shows for 2024.

== Professional boxing record ==
7 fights	7 wins	0 losses
By knockout	4	0
By decision	3	0

No.	Result	Opponent	Type	Date	Location
7	Win	Marian Wesolowski	TKO	2023-09-01	Graakjaer Arena, Holstebro
6	Win	Michal Dufek	TKO	2023-06-16	Humo Arena, Tashkent
5	Win	Jakub Laskowski	PTS	2023-03-04	Newcastle Arena, Newcastle
4	Win	Angelo Turco	PTS	2022-10-15	Olympia, Liverpool
3	Win	Jose Hernandez	TKO	2022-04-22	Echo Arena, Liverpool
2	Win	Szilveszter Ajtai	TKO	2021-11-13	Classic Remise, Duesseldorf
1	Win	Rafael Castillo	UD	2021-06-05	Pabellon Campio Llorens, Villarreal
