= Ryan Hartslief =

Irish footballer and rugby player

Personal information
- Date of birth: 28 February 1979 (age 47)
- Place of birth: Cork, Ireland
- Position: Central defender

Youth career
- 1998–2000: Rand Afrikaans University

Senior career*
Years	Team	Apps	(Gls)
2000–2001	Kaizer Chiefs	27	(0)
2001–2004	Black Leopards	75	(0)
2004–2005	Golden Arrows	20	(0)
2005–2006	Hellenic FC	19	(0)
- * Club domestic league appearances and goals

Ryan Hartslief (born 28 February 1978 in Cork) is a retired Irish footballer and rugby player.

== Early life ==
Hartslief was born in the Irish city of Cork and raised in Springs, Gauteng in South Africa who attended 1998 to the Rand Afrikaans University and studies between 2000 BCOM Sports Management.

== Career ==
He played in South Africa for Kaizer Chiefs, Black Leopards, Golden Arrows and Hellenic FC.

== Retirement ==
Hartslief is currently active as a player agent, and runs the Big Time Sports Management agency.

=== Rugby ===
He played after his retirement one year in 2006 Rugby for the Welkom Rovers in South Africa.
