= Bartragh Island =

Island in County Mayo, Ireland

Native name: An Bheartrach
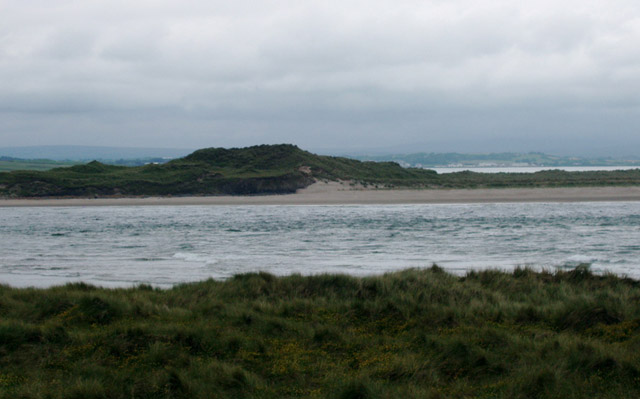
- Bartragh island from Bartragh Head

- Location within island of Ireland

Geography
- Location: Killala Bay
- Coordinates: 54.214°N 9.163°W
- Area: 1.934 km^{2} (0.747 sq mi)

Administration
- Ireland
- Province: Connacht
- County: Mayo

Bartragh Island (Irish: An Bheartrach) is a sandy island and a townland located in Killala Bay, County Mayo, Ireland. It lies across the bay from the town of Killala on the mainland.

== Geography ==
The island is around 0.75 square miles (1.9 square kilometres) in area. It's located around a mile from the shore and, with low tide, can be reached on foot.

== History ==
In 1741, the Kirkwood family became associated with Bartragh Island when Dorothy Kirkwood held a lease from James O'Hara, 2nd Baron Tyrawley for lands at Moyne. This lease appears to have lapsed, and in 1831, the Kirkwoods leased the estate again following its sale by the Court of Chancery. The construction of Bartragh House is attributed to Captain Charles Kirkwood in the 1830s. A retired naval officer who had served with Lord Nelson at the Battle of Trafalgar and subsequently engaged in trade with India, Kirkwood acquired significant wealth and purchased multiple townlands, including Bartragh. The house, a U-shaped structure with a central courtyard, was designed to withstand the maritime environment, with reception rooms in the main block and bedrooms and service areas in the rear wing. By the early 20th century, the property comprised seventeen rooms and approximately twenty outbuildings.

In April 1837, three men were charged with vandalising Charles Kirkwood’s house on Bartragh Island, breaking 156 panes of glass, damaging railings, and destroying plaster ornaments and newly planted shrubbery. The motive was reportedly Kirkwood’s sale of mutton in Killala below market price. At the time, the Kirkwoods were living in Killala town, and the house on the island was unoccupied due to winter and its recent construction. Charles Kirkwood married Henrietta Knox in December 1838, and their first son was born at Bartragh House in September 1840, followed by five more children later in the decade.

In 1843, a storm stranded six men fishing for herring near the island; four reached Kirkwood’s house safely, while two were located by servants and ferried back, though one did not survive. Kirkwood’s later years were marked by deteriorating mental health; in 1849, he was declared of unsound mind and placed in an asylum in Finglas, Dublin, where he remained until he died in 1859. Ownership passed to his son, Captain Charles Knox Kirkwood, and subsequently to Claud Arthur Kirkwood, who lived a solitary life on Bartragh.

Just after the Second World War, Claud Kirkwood sold Bartragh Island to a "Captain Verner". In 1947, a CIE lorry delivering turf and furniture to the island for Captain and Mrs. MacKenzie-Verner became stuck in the sand. Captain Verner’s wife was a sister of the actress Joyce Redman, who later purchased the house and visited it regularly.

By 1952, the island was owned by Captain Charles Wynne-Roberts, Redman’s husband, a director of Calor Gas and son of the founders of General Electric. The house was used as a summer residence, with modern amenities including a private power generator and hot and cold running water. The couple hosted friends, and their caretaker, Tom Duff, left the island only once a week for mass. While human presence was limited, the estate supported livestock, including a cow, calf, eight sheep, a donkey with a foal, and fifty chickens, alongside over two thousand rabbits. Mail was delivered to the nearby mainland three times per week.

In 1978, Bartragh Island was offered for sale, and by 1989, it was purchased by psychologist Mary Molloy. She carried out extensive renovations on Bartragh House during the 1990s with the intention of creating a Natural Health and Education Centre, including plans to re-establish a walled garden and improve infrastructure. These efforts were ultimately unsuccessful, and Molloy was eventually forced to sell the island, although a later court case upheld her ownership rights. By this time, the house had already begun to deteriorate.

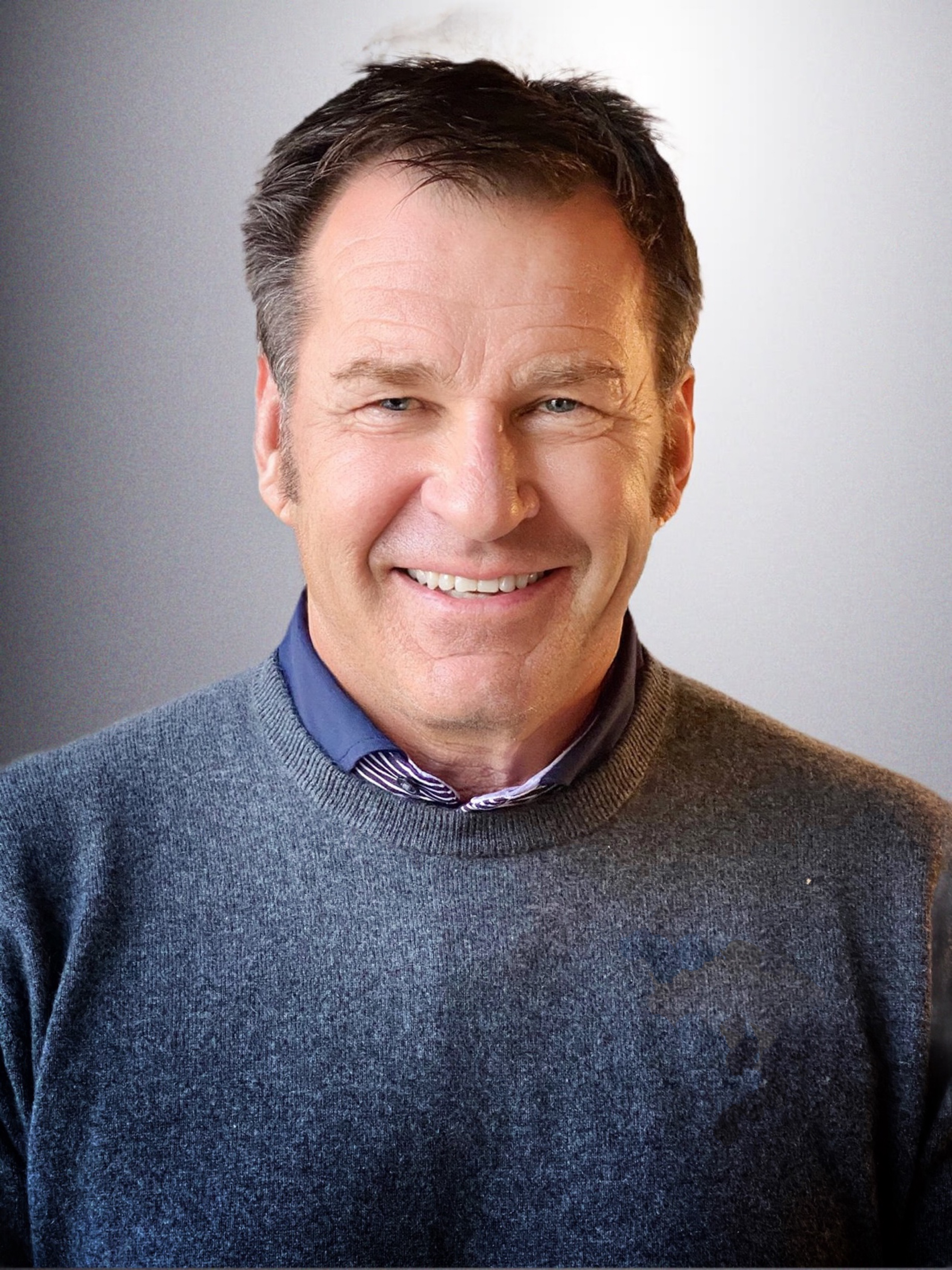
British golfer Nick Faldo owned the island for a prolonged period

In 2003, the island was acquired by British golfer Nick Faldo, who intended to construct a Ryder Cup-class golf course. Nick Faldo’s plans to develop Bartragh Island into a world-class golf course emphasised a sensitive, “handcrafted” links design that would follow the island’s natural contours, minimising environmental impact and avoiding heavy construction. Supporters saw the project as a potential boost for local tourism and employment, particularly given the west of Ireland’s relatively undeveloped golf infrastructure. Despite this interest, by 2020 the project had stalled due to legal disputes over ownership, opposition from conservationists (as the island is designated a European Union special protection area for birds) and practical challenges such as tidal access and the derelict state of Bartragh House. The house remains in ruins, and the island is largely uninhabited and subject to vandalism, while the surrounding environment now supports wildlife, including redshank, curlew, ringed plover, brent geese, bar-tailed godwit, dunlin, and oystercatcher.

In 2021, the island sold for €1.1 million. The new owner, reportedly a European investor, reportedly intends to develop it as an environmentally sustainable farm with a luxury home for high-end holiday use.

== Demographics ==
Historical population

Year	Pop.	±%
1841	28	—
1851	16	−42.9%
1861	7	−56.2%
1871	20	+185.7%
1881	22	+10.0%
1891	2	−90.9%
1901	6	+200.0%
1911	4	−33.3%

Year	Pop.	±%
1926	3	−25.0%
1936	0	−100.0%
1946	2	—
1951	3	+50.0%
1956	0	−100.0%
1961	0	0.00%
1966	0	0.00%
1971	0	0.00%

Year	Pop.	±%
1979	0	0.00%
1981	0	0.00%
1986	0	0.00%
1991	0	0.00%
1996	0	0.00%
2002	0	0.00%
2006	0	0.00%

Source: Central Statistics Office. "CNA17: Population by Off Shore Island, Sex and Year". CSO.ie.

== Nature ==
Bartragh island is a birdwatching site, well known for great skuas.

== See also ==
- List of islands of Ireland
