= Martin King (hurler) =

Irish hurler (1900–1969)

Personal information
- Born: 30 August 1900 Galway, Ireland
- Died: 9 March 1969 (aged 68) Galway, Ireland
- Occupation: Labourer

Sport
- Sport: Hurling
Clubs
- Years: Club
- Sinn Féin HC; Tom Ashe HC; Liam Mellows
Club titles
- Galway titles: 0
Inter-county
- Years: County
- Galway
Inter-county titles
- All-Irelands: 1

Martin King (30 August 1900 – 9 March 1969) was an Irish hurler. At club level he played with several teams, including Liam Mellows, while at inter-county level he lined out with the Galway senior hurling team.

== Career ==
King played hurling with numerous clubs, including the Sinn Féin hurling club and the Tom Ashe hurling club, before lining out with the Liam Mellows club. He was a forward on the Galway senior hurling team that beat Limerick by 7–03 to 4–05 in the 1923 All-Ireland final. King was again part of the team the following year, however, Galway were beaten by Dublin in that year's All-Ireland final.

== Personal life and death ==
King was a member of the Galway Battalion of the Irish Republican Army and was active during the War of Independence. After the Civil War he was imprisoned in Galway, Limerick, Kilmainham Gaol and Gormanston, where he went on hunger strike.

King died at Galway Regional Hospital on 9 March 1969, at the age of 68.

== Honours ==
Galway

- All-Ireland Senior Hurling Championship: 1923
