= Hugh T. Baker =

Irish cricketer

Personal information
- Full name: Hugh Thomas Baker
- Born: 19 July 1906; Midleton, Ireland
- Died: 1989 (aged 82/83); Harare, Zimbabwe
- Batting: Right-handed

Domestic team information
- Years: Team
- 1926: Dublin University

Career statistics
Competition	First-class
Matches	1
Runs scored	2
Batting average	2.00
100s/50s	–/–
Top score	2
Catches/stumpings	–/–
- Source: Cricinfo, 2 January 2022

Hugh Thomas Baker (19 July 1906 in County Cork, Ireland – 1989 in Harare, Zimbabwe) was an Irish cricketer. He was a right-handed batsman who played one first-class game for Dublin University against Northamptonshire in 1926, scoring two runs in a match that also featured the Irish playwright Samuel Beckett on his team.
