= Killala Bay =

Bay between Counties Mayo and Sligo in Ireland

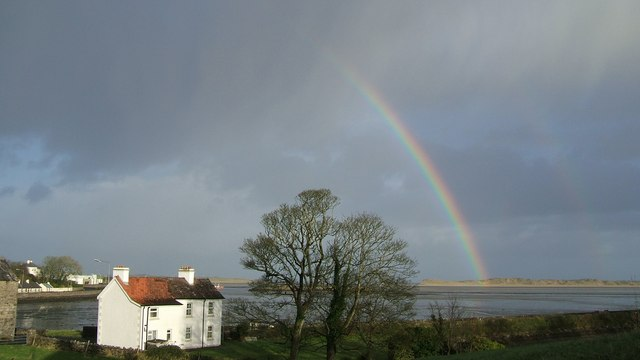

- Location within Ireland
- Location: County Mayo
- Coordinates: 54°15′N 9°08′W
- Ocean/sea sources: Atlantic Ocean
- Basin countries: Ireland
- Max. width: 5.5 miles (8.9 km)
- Surface area: 1,061 hectares (10.61 km^{2})
- Max. depth: 36 metres (20 fathoms)
- Settlements: Killala

Ramsar Wetland
- Official name: Killala Bay/Moy Estuary
- Designated: 7 June 1996
- Reference no.: 843

Killala Bay (Irish: Cuan Chill Ala) is a bay on the west coast of Ireland, between County Mayo and County Sligo, with Kilcummin Head to the west and Lenadoon Point to the east, which is the estuary for the River Moy. The village of Killala is at the southwest corner of the bay.

== Geography ==
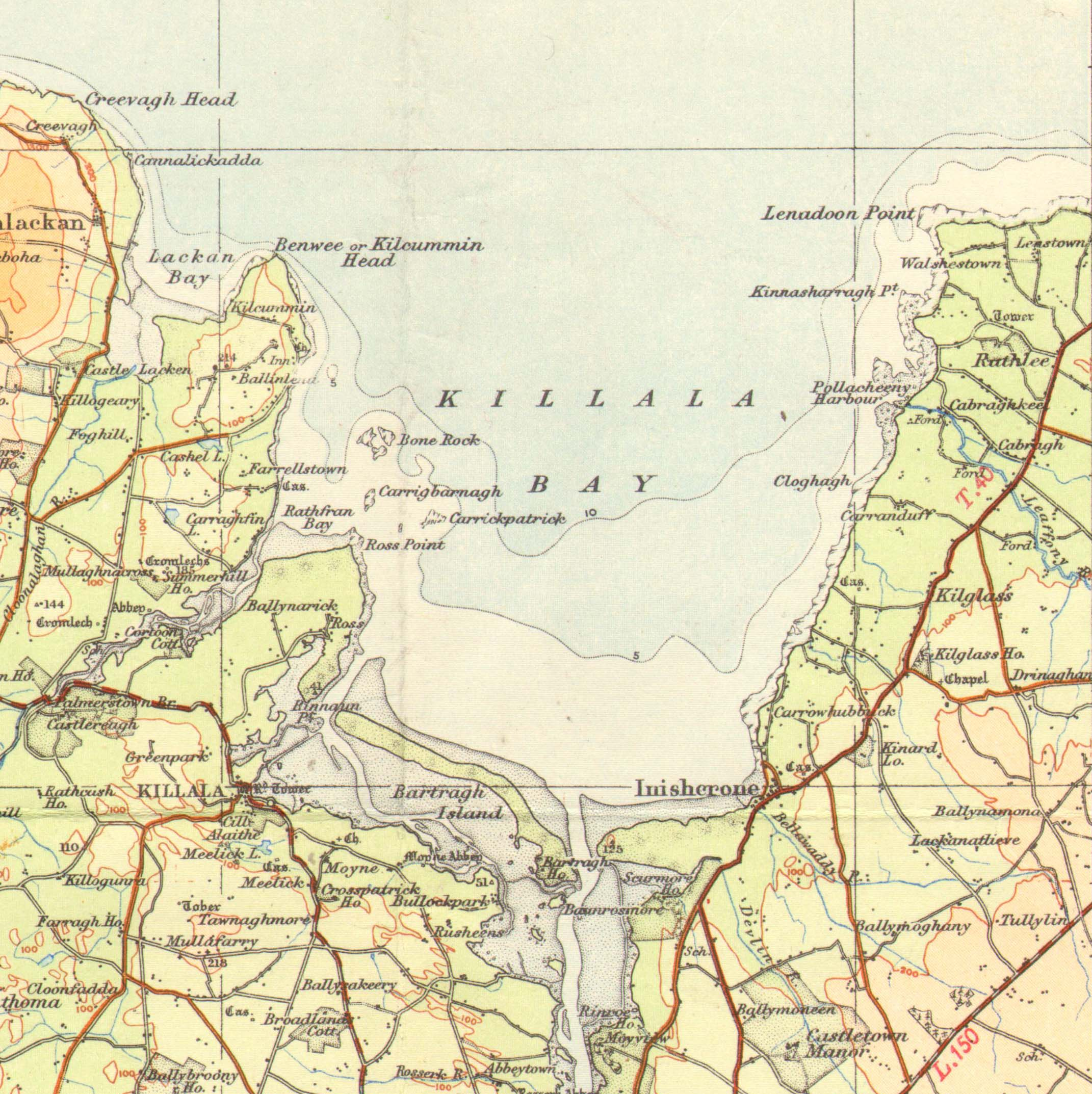
Killala Bay from Ordnance Survey Ireland Half-Inch Sheet 6 North Mayo, Published 1956

The bay is on the west coast of Ireland between County Mayo and County Sligo, between Kilcummin Head to the west and Lenadoon Point to the east. It is the estuary for the River Moy. The village of Killala is at the southwest corner of the bay, and Bartragh Island in the centre of it.

=== Water ===
The bay is an extension of the estuary of the River Moy, with deep waters of the continental shelf close to the shore. The total area is 1,061 hectares (10.61 km^{2}). The bay is about 5.5 miles (8.9 km) wide and the maximum depth is 36 metres (20 fathoms).

The middle of the bay is safe for boats but caution needs to be exercised near the shoreline.

=== Shore ===
Kilcummin Head, also known as Benwee Head, is regarded as the start of Killala Bay. As such excludes Lackan Bay and Creevagh Head which lie to the northwest. To the south of the head lies the village of Kilcummin. Counter-clockwise round the bay there is Killala, River Moy, Enniscrone, Pollacheeny Harbour, before Lenadoon Point.

== Activities ==
Killala Bay is an excellent fishing location due to the close proximity of the deep waters of the continental shelf, having both deep water rock marks (Note: A mark is a spot suitable for the fishing), beach marks, and opportunities to catch deep water species from charter boats. Cockles can be found in the bay due to its sheltered nature.

Ross Strand on the bay near Killala village is a Blue Flag beach.
