= Richard J. Ussher =

Irish ornithologist and speleologist

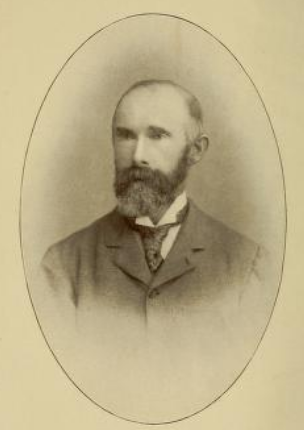
- Born: 6 April 1841; Cappagh House, Cappagh, County Waterford, Ireland
- Died: 12 October 1913 (aged 72)
- Scientific career
- Fields: Ornithology and Speleology

Richard John Ussher (6 April 1841 – 12 October 1913) was an Irish ornithologist and speleologist.

== Early life and family ==
Ussher was born at Cappagh House, Cappagh, County Waterford on 6 April 1841. His parents were Isabella (née Grant) and Richard Kiely Ussher (1778–1854). Isabella was Richard's second wife, and Ussher was their only child that survived infancy. His maternal grandfather was the governor of Upper Canada and later Carlisle, Col. Jasper Grant. From the age of twelve, Ussher attended Portarlington school in County Laois and then Chester. Following the death of his father and owing to his own delicate health, Ussher returned home to be tutored. He attended Trinity College Dublin but did not graduate due to poor health. He and his mother would winter in continental Europe.

In 1866, he married Elizabeth Owen Finlay. After their marriage they lived abroad but returned to Ireland in 1875 to live at Ballynahemery, near Cappagh. The couple had five children.

== Career ==
He lived mostly in continental Europe but in 1866 he returned to Cappagh, married and thereafter divide his time between Ireland and Europe. He was initially interested in oology but later joined the Society for the Protection of Birds. He is best known for a seminal work on Irish birds written with Robert Warren: The Birds of Ireland. An account of the distribution, migrations and habits of birds as observed in Ireland, with all additions to the Irish list. Gurney and Jackson, London. (1900). He was one of the first authors to contribute to the Irish Naturalist (1892 The crossbill (Loxia curvirostra L.) in Ireland. Irish Naturalist 1: 6-9). Ussher studied the fossil remains of extinct avians and mammals at cave sites in Counties Cork, Waterford, Clare and Sligo in company with English (Henry Seebohm, Howard Saunders, Andrew Leith Adams), French and German ornithologists and vertebrate palaeontologists.

He was High Sheriff of County Waterford in 1901.

== Death and legacy ==
He died on 12 October 1913 in Cappagh, and is buried in the family vault at Whitechurch. He donated his papers to the Royal Irish Academy.
