= 1811 in Ireland =

- Centuries: 17th; 18th; 19th; 20th; 21st
- Decades: 1790s; 1800s; 1810s; 1820s; 1830s
- See also: 1811 in the United Kingdom; Other events of 1811; List of years in Ireland

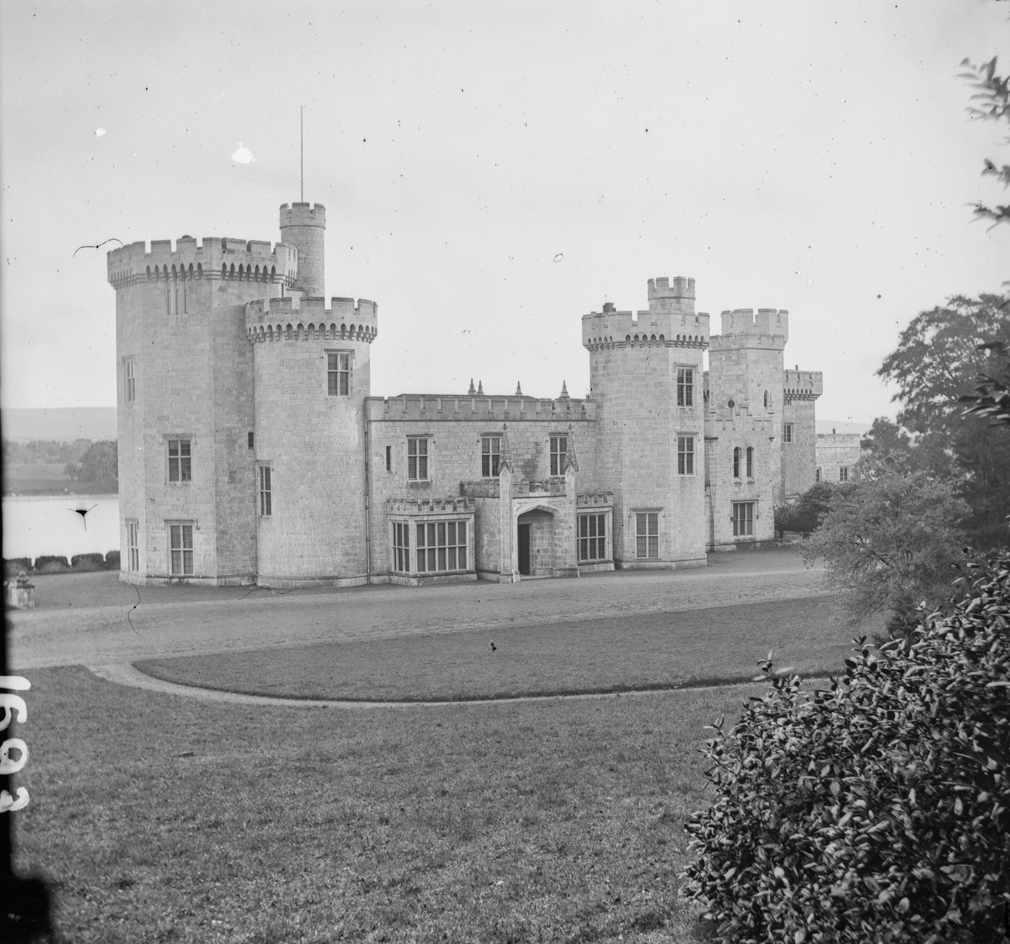

Events from the year 1811 in Ireland.

== Events ==
- Kildare Place Society (formally, The Society for Promoting the Education of the Poor in Ireland) founded as a non-denominational organisation by a group of Dublin philanthropists.
- The Missionary: An Indian Tale, a romance novela by Irish author Sydney Owenson (Lady Morgan) is published.
- 4 December – Royal Navy frigate HMS Saldanha (1809) is driven in a gale onto rocks in Lough Swilly with no survivors from the estimated 253 aboard.

== Arts and literature ==
- James Sheridan Knowles' play Brian Boroihme; or, The Maid of Erin is performed in Belfast.

== Births ==
- 21 January – James Hamilton, 1st Duke of Abercorn, politician and twice Lord Lieutenant of Ireland (died 1885).
- 10 March – Yankee Sullivan, bare knuckle fighter and boxer (died 1856).
- 11 March – Lady Katherine Sophia Kane née Baily, botanist (died 1886).
- 11 November – John Egan, businessman and politician in Ottawa (died 1857).
  Full date unknown
- Patrick Murray, theologian (died 1882).

== Deaths ==
- Robert Brooke, soldier, Governor of St Helena (born 1744).

== See also ==
- 1811 in Scotland
- 1811 in Wales
