= John Abraham Fisher =

British musician

- Born: 1744
- Died: 1806 (aged 61–62)

John Abraham Fisher (1744 – May or June 1806) was an English violinist and composer.

== Biography ==
Fisher was born at Dunstable in 1744, the son of Richard Fisher. He was brought up in Lord Tyrawley's house, learning the violin from Thomas Pinto, and his appearance at the King's Theatre (1763), where he played a concerto, was "by permission" of his patron. The following year Fisher was enrolled in the Royal Society of Musicians. He matriculated at Magdalen College, Oxford, 26 June 1777. His indefatigable industry obtained him the degrees of Bac. and Doc. Mus. on 5 July 1777, his oratorio Providence being performed at the Sheldonian Theatre two days previously. The work was afterwards heard several times in London; but Fisher's name as a composer is more closely connected with theatrical than with sacred music.

He became entitled to a sixteenth share of Covent Garden Theatre by his marriage about 1770 with Miss Powell, daughter of a proprietor. He devoted his musical talent and business energy to the theatre. When his wife died Fisher sold his share in the theatre, and made a professional tour on the continent, visiting France, Germany, and Russia, and reaching Vienna in 1784. The Tonkünstler-Societät employed three languages in a memorandum—"Monsieur Fischer, ein Engelländer und virtuoso di Violino"—which probably refers to the stranger's performance at a concert of the society. Fisher won favour also at court, and became as widely known for his eccentricities as for his ingenious performances. It was not long before he drew odium upon himself through his marriage with, and subsequent ill-treatment of, Anna Storace, the prima donna. The wedding had taken place with a certain amount of éclat, but when the virtuoso bullied and even struck his bride, the scandal soon became public, and a separation followed. Fisher visited Mozart that week who supported Fisher's case. The emperor (Joseph) ordered Fisher to quit his dominion. Leaving his young wife he sought refuge in Ireland. The cordiality with which his old friend Robert Owenson welcomed him to Dublin, his personal appearance, and introduction into the family circle, have been amusingly described by Sydney, Lady Morgan, one of Owenson's daughters. Fisher gave concerts at the Rotunda, and occupied himself as a teacher. He died in May or June 1806.

== Works ==
As an executant Fisher pleased by his skill and fiery energy. In his youth he appears to have revelled in his command of the instrument, and in his mature years he offended the critics by a showiness that bordered on charlatanism. Among Fisher's compositions, his Six Easy Solos for a Violin and Six Duettos were useful to amateurs of the time; while his Vauxhall and Marybone Songs, in three books, were made popular by the singing of Mrs. Weichsel, Vernon, and Bellamy. Another favourite book was a collection of airs forming A Comparative View of the English, French, and Italian Schools, which, however, contains no critical remarks. The songs In Vain I Seek to Calm to Rest and See with Rosy Beam deserve mention. The Six Symphonies, all scored for two oboes, two bassoons, two horns and strings were played at Vauxhall and at the theatres; the manuscript of a seventh symphony is held at the British Library. Recordings of the six symphonies were issued by Naxos in 2021.

The pantomime, with music, Master of the Woods, was produced at Sadler's Wells; the Harlequin Jubilee at Covent Garden, and, with the 'Sylphs' and the 'Sirens', gave evidence of the professor's facility in manufacturing musicianly serio-comic measures. The Norwood Gipsies, 'Prometheus', 'Macbeth', and lastly 'Zobeide', point to a more serious vein, though belonging equally to Fisher's theatrical period, about 1770–80; but the well-written anthem, 'Seek ye the Lord', sung at Bedford Chapel and Lincoln Cathedral. is of later date. Three violin concertos were published at Berlin, 1782.

(Note: [Grove's Dictionary i. 530; Brown's Biog. Dictionary page 247; A. B. C. Dario. page 20; Pohl's Mozart and Haydn in London, i. 42. &c.; Royal Society of Musicians, entry 2 September 1764; Oxford Graduates, page 231; Kelly's Reminiscences, i. 231; Musical World, 1840, page 276; Hanslick's Geshichte des Concertwesens in Wien, page 108; Mount-Edgcumbe's Reminiscences, 1834, page 59; Clayton's Queens of Song, i. 215; Lady Morgan's Memoirs, 1863, page 80; Gentlemen's Magazine volume lxxvi. part i. page 587; Gerber's Tonkünstler-Lexikon. 1770, i.418; Fisher's music in British Museum Library.])
