= Lady Olivia =

Lady Olivia may refer to:

- Lady Olivia Sparrow, Anglo-Irish landowner and philanthropist
- Olivia Owenson, Lady Clarke, British-Irish poet and dramatist
- Lady Olivia FitzPatrick, wife of Thomas Taylour, 2nd Marquess of Headfort and mother of Patsy Cornwallis-West
- Lady Olivia (Amphibia), a supporting character in Amphibia
