= Portrait of Lady Morgan =

Painting by René Théodore Berthon

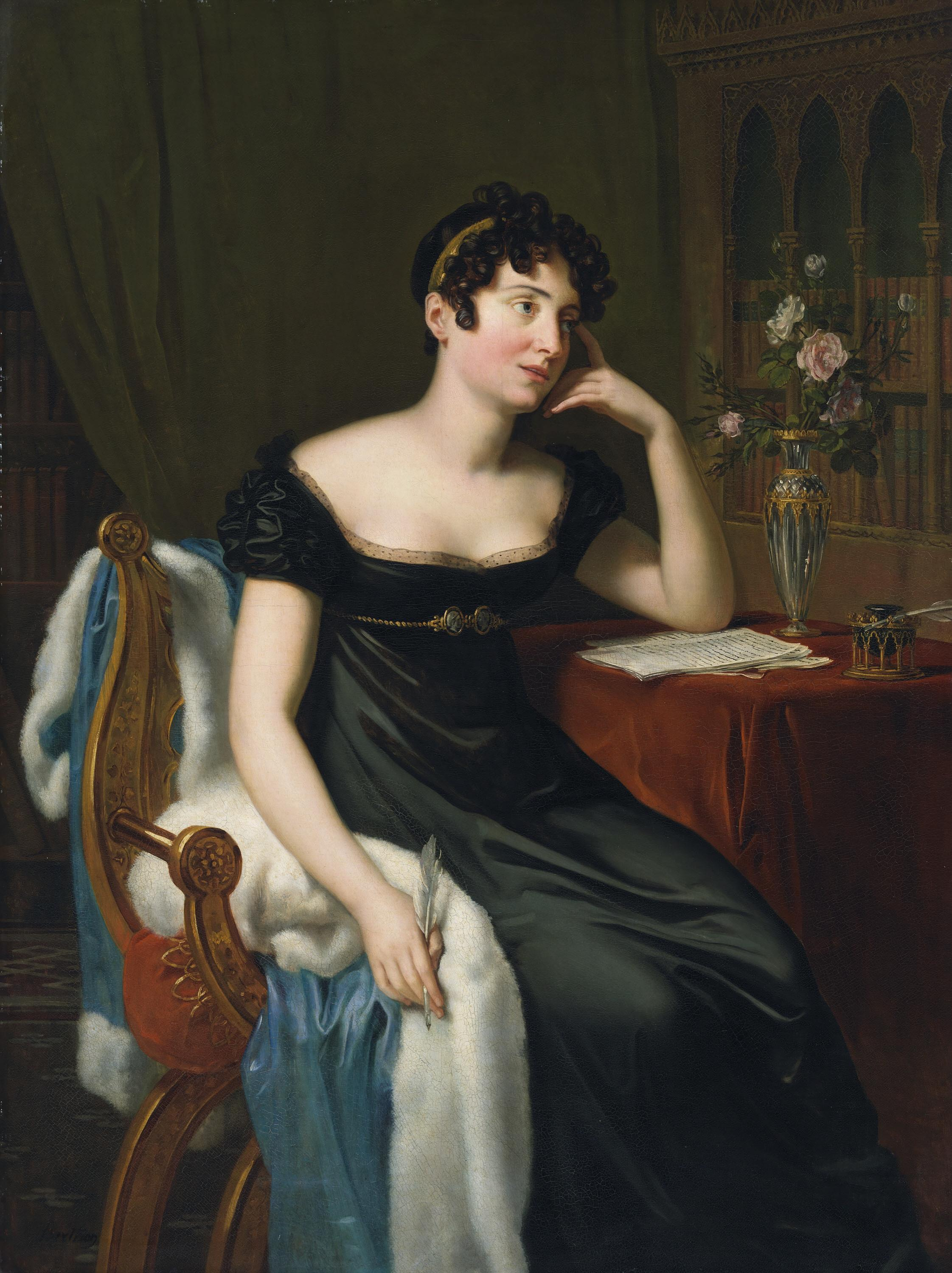
- Artist: René Théodore Berthon
- Year: 1818
- Type: Oil on canvas, portrait painting
- Dimensions: 130 cm × 98 cm (51 in × 39 in)
- Location: National Gallery of Ireland; Dublin

Portrait of Lady Morgan is an 1818 portrait painting by the French artist René Théodore Berthon. It depicts the Irish novelist Sydney, Lady Morgan, a notable figure of the romantic movement known in the Regency era for works such as The Wild Irish Girl.

The picture was exhibited at the Salon of 1819 held at the Louvre in Paris during the Bourbon Restoration. Today the painting is in the National Gallery of Ireland in Dublin, having been bequeathed by the sitter at her death in 1859.

== Bibliography ==
- Bourke, Mary & Bhreathnach-Lynch, Síghle. Discover Irish Art at the National Gallery of Ireland. National Gallery of Ireland, 1999.
- Bhreathnach-Lynch, Síghle. Ireland's Art, Ireland's History: Representing Ireland, 1845 to Present. Creighton University Press, 2009.
- Lewis, Charlene M. Boyer. Elizabeth Patterson Bonaparte: An American Aristocrat in the Early Republic. : University of Pennsylvania, 2012.
