= Henry William Stisted =

British military officer

Lieutenant-General Sir Henry William Stisted KCB
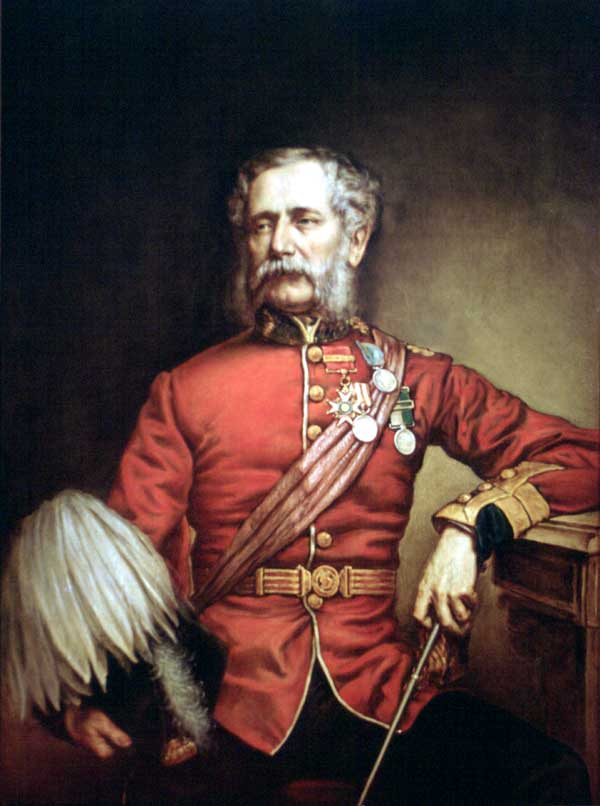
- Portrait by George Theodore Berthon

1st Lieutenant Governor of Ontario
- In office 1 July 1867 – 14 July 1868
- Monarch: Victoria
- Governor General: The Viscount Monck
- Premier: John Sandfield Macdonald
- Preceded by: None
- Succeeded by: William Pearce Howland

Personal details
- Born: 5 June 1817 Saint-Omer, Pas-de-Calais, France
- Died: 10 December 1875 (aged 58) Upper Norwood, England

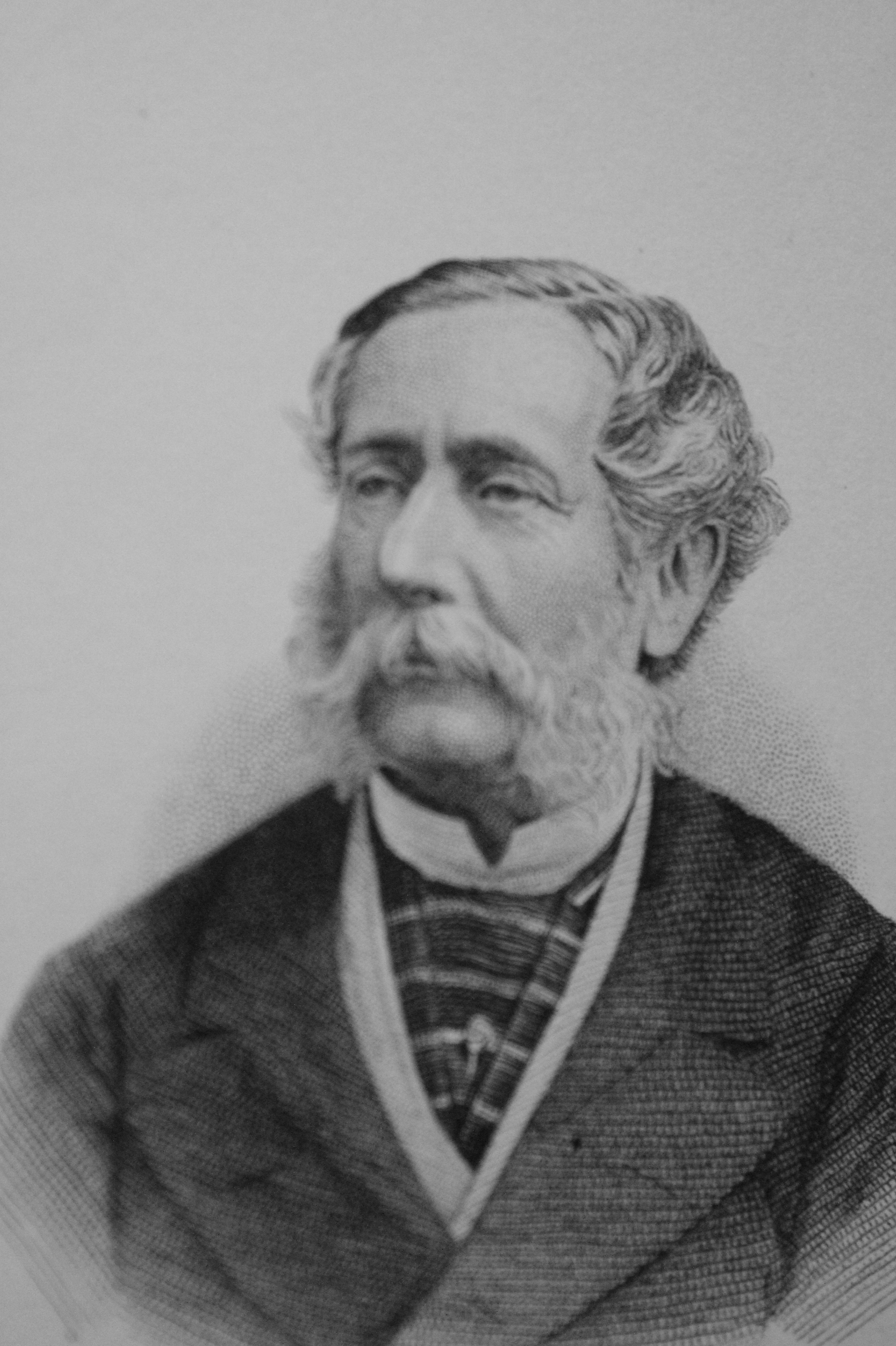
Henry William Stisted

Lieutenant-General Sir Henry William Stisted KCB (5 June 1817 – 10 December 1875) was a British Army officer who served as the first Lieutenant Governor of Ontario after Confederation, from 1867 to 1868.

Born 1817, at St-Omer, France, to Lieutenant-Colonel Charles Stisted (1786–1842) of the 3rd The King's Own Hussars, by his wife Eliza Maria (b.1787 Bengal, India) d. 1822 Ipswich, UK,) daughter of Major-General William Burn (c1745–1814) of Exeter, Devon.

After being educated at Sandhurst, he entered the army as an ensign in the 2nd foot on 4 December 1835, and served with his regiment in Afghanistan and Beloochistan, taking part in the storming of Ghuznee, where he was wounded at the gateway, the capture of Khelat, and the occupation of Kabul, for which he received a medal. On 19 April 1850 he was gazetted lieutenant-colonel of the 78th foot, and in the Persian war of 1856 and 1857 commanded a brigade in the night attack and battle of Kooshat, and took charge of his own regiment at the bombardment of Mohamrah, after which he received the thanks of the governor-general as well as a medal and clasps. He commanded the advanced guard of Havelock's force at the relief of Lucknow, 25 September 1857, when, upon the death in battle of Brigadier-general James George Smith Neill, he was appointed to command the first brigade. That post he held until the close of the operations, when on 1 January 1858 he was nominated C.B. In that year he served also in Rohilcund and commanded the second brigade at the battle of Bareilly on 7 May.

He became lieutenant-colonel of the 93rd foot on 30 September 1859 and served with the field force against the mountain tribes on the north-west frontier of India in December 1863. He was appointed Major General in 1864 and divisional commander of British forces in Canada in 1866 and appointed Lieutenant Governor of Ontario in June 1867. He was instrumental in opening up the northern part of the province for development. For his services in this capacity he received the thanks of the governor-general of Canada and was nominated a K.C.B. on 20 May 1871. On 5 February 1873, he was appointed a lieutenant-general and was nominated colonel of the 93rd foot on 28 September 1873.

He died at Wood House, Upper Norwood, Surrey, on 10 December 1875. In 1845, at Florence, he had married Maria Katherine Eliza Burton (1823–1894), sister of explorer Sir Richard Francis Burton. Their daughter, Georgiana Martha Stisted (1846–1903), published The True Life of Captain Sir Richard Burton.

He was buried at West Norwood Cemetery, London, and is the only Lieutenant Governor of Ontario not buried in Canada.

Government offices
New office	Lieutenant Governor of Ontario; 1867–1868	Succeeded by William Pearce Howland
