= George Théodore Berthon =

Canadian portrait artist (1806–1892)

George Théodore Berthon RCA
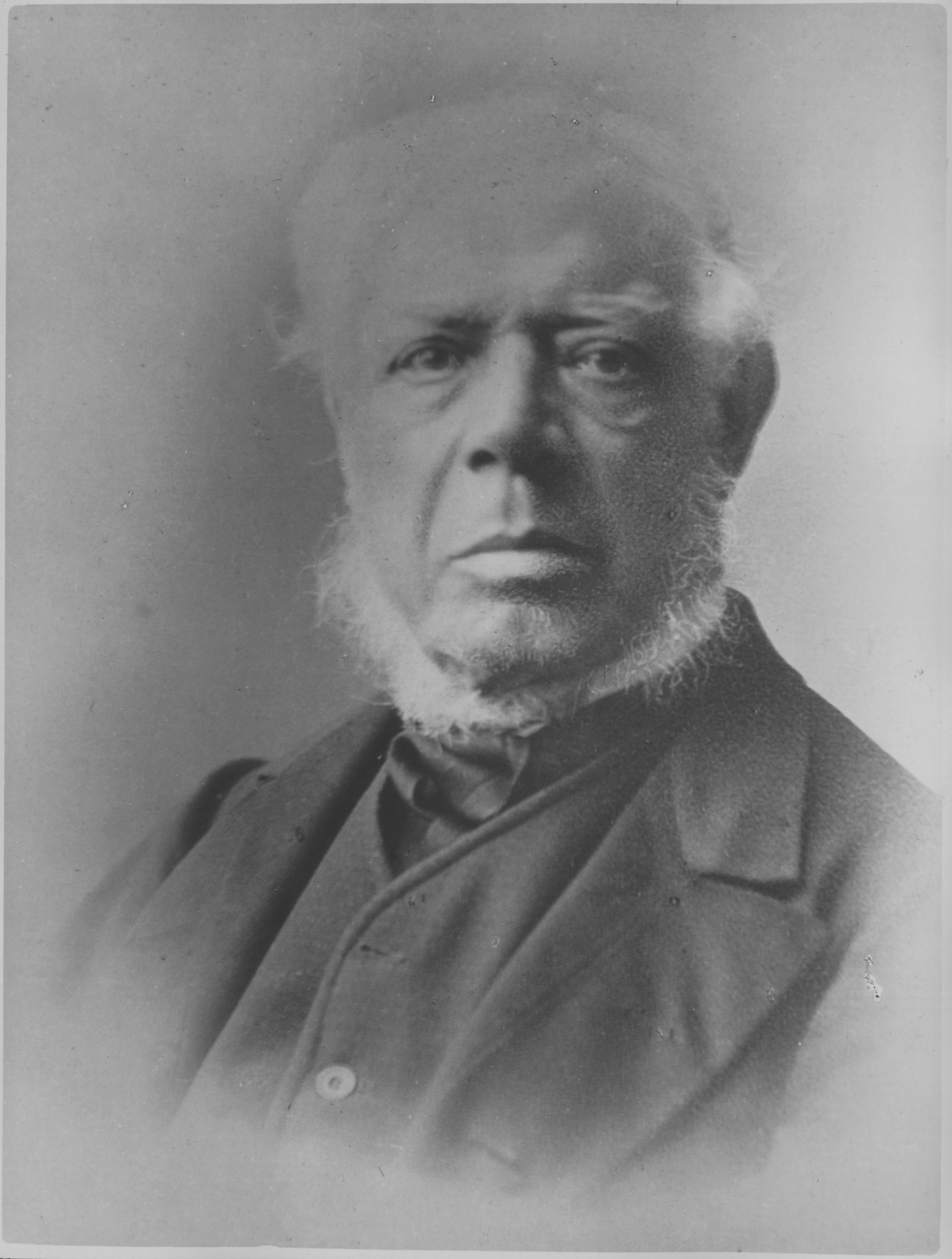
- Born: 3 May 1806; Royal Palace of Vienna
- Died: 18 January 1892 (aged 85)
- Education: Paris, France. He likely was trained by his father who is said to have been a student of Jacques Louis David
- Known for: Canadian portrait artist

George Théodore Berthon RCA (3 May 1806 – 18 January 1892) was a Canadian portrait painter. Born in Vienna to a well-known French portrait painter, René Théodore Berthon, he emigrated first to Great Britain, and then to Canada, sometime before 1845. He specialised in portraiture of high-ranking British and Canadian officials, developing a sense of realism and simplicity. He died in Toronto in 1892.

== Biography ==
Berthon's father, René Théodore Berthon, was a court painter to Napoleon I, and likely trained his son in art. As well, his knowledge of art in Paris would have been significant: his father was a student of Jacques Louis David. As an adult, he lived in England for a number of years in the household of Sir Robert Peel to teach Peel's daughters drawing and French. The first verifiable record of his emigration to Canada is an advertisement for his portraiture services in a Toronto newspaper in 1845.

Berthon was notable in the history of Canada for his creation of formal portraits characterized by a sense of realism. He focused on defining his subjects' features and characters without idealization. The composition of his portraits remains simple with dark backgrounds. His work is important both as a historical record and as an example of the style of Canadian portraiture during that period.

He was nominated as a founding member of the Royal Canadian Academy of Arts but failed to qualify. He was elected a life member of the Ontario Society of Artists in 1891.

He died of a bronchial infection, at his Toronto home, in 1892.

== Paintings by George Théodore Berthon ==
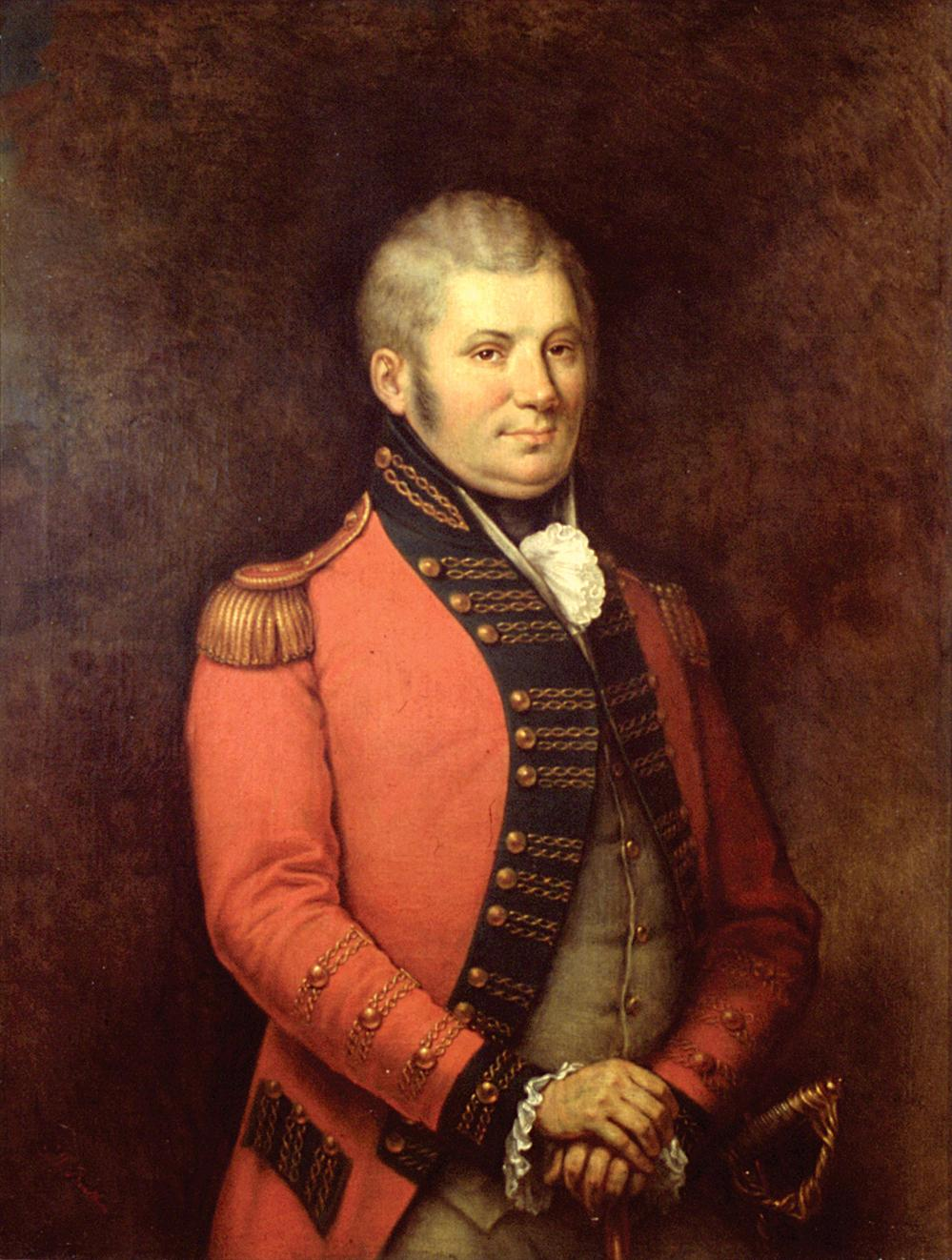
Colonel John Graves Simcoe

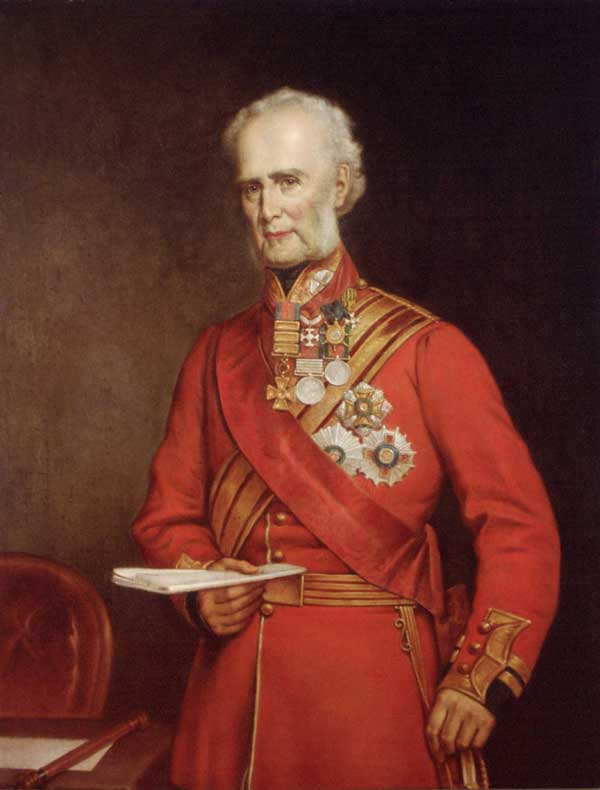
Sir John Colborne, GCB, GCMG (Baron Seaton) Lieutenant Governor of Upper Canada, 1828–36

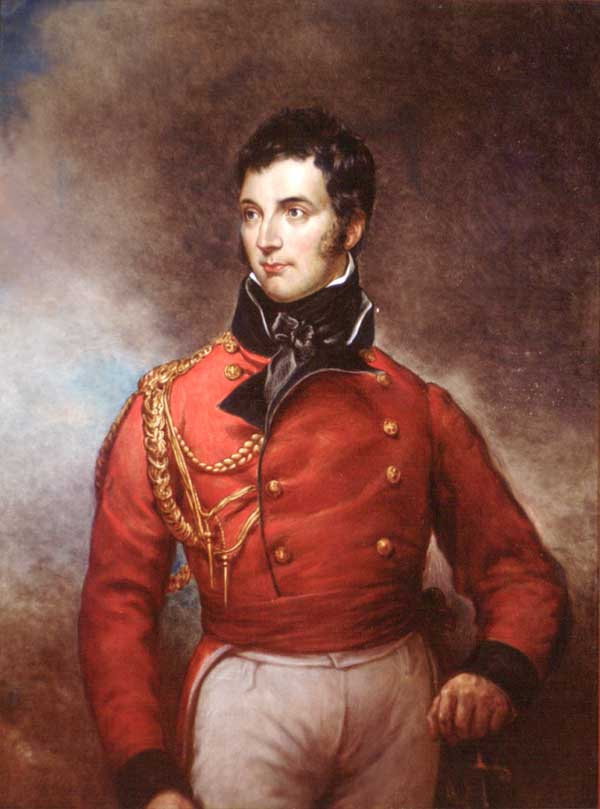
George Murray (British Army officer), Governor of Upper Canada, 1815

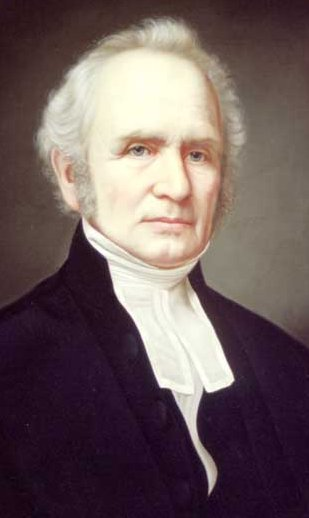
Sir John Beverley Robinson

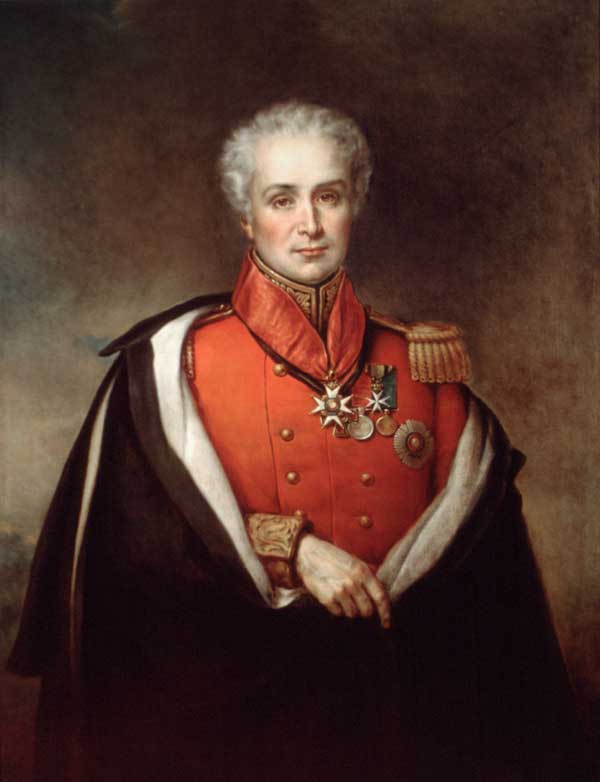
Peregrine Maitland

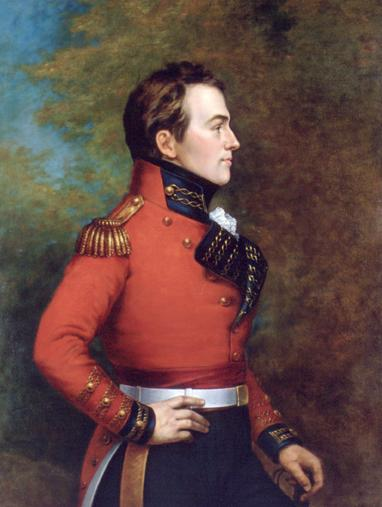
General Isaac Brock c. 1883

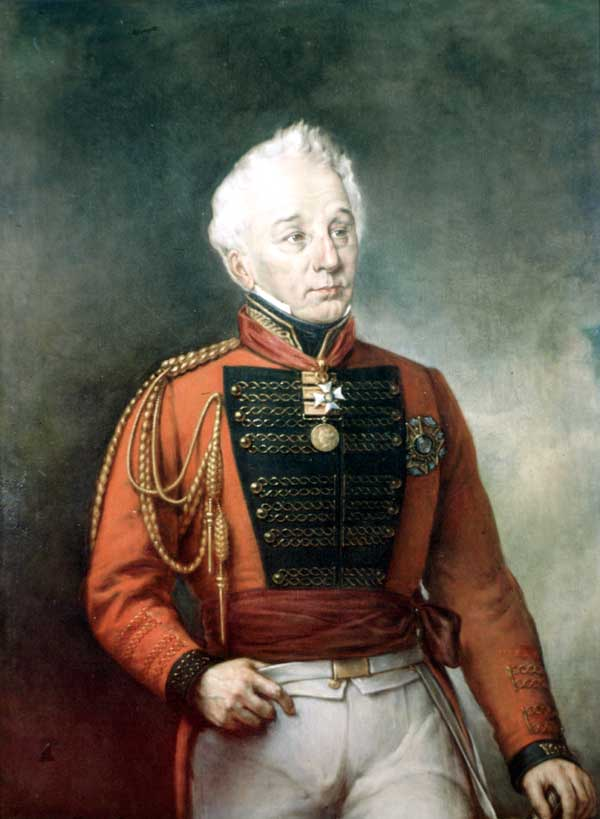
Lieutenant Governor Frederick Philipse Robinson, Upper Canada, 1815

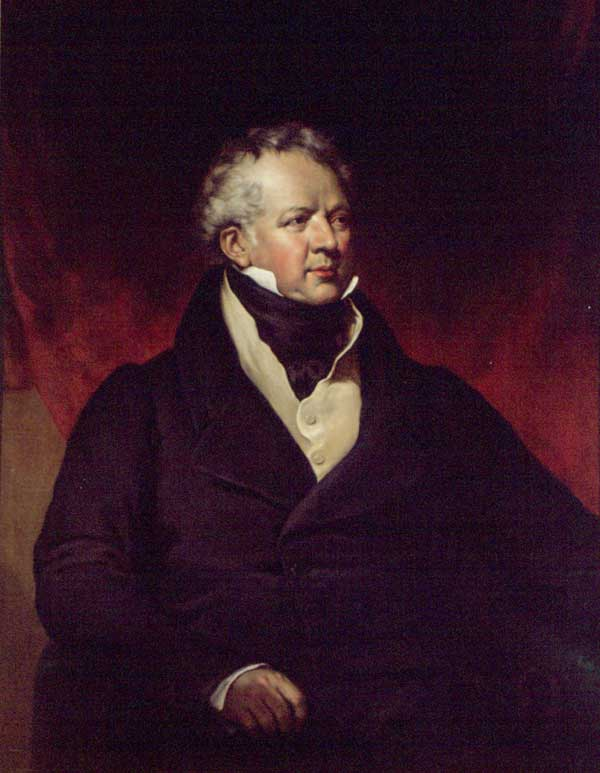
Francis Gore

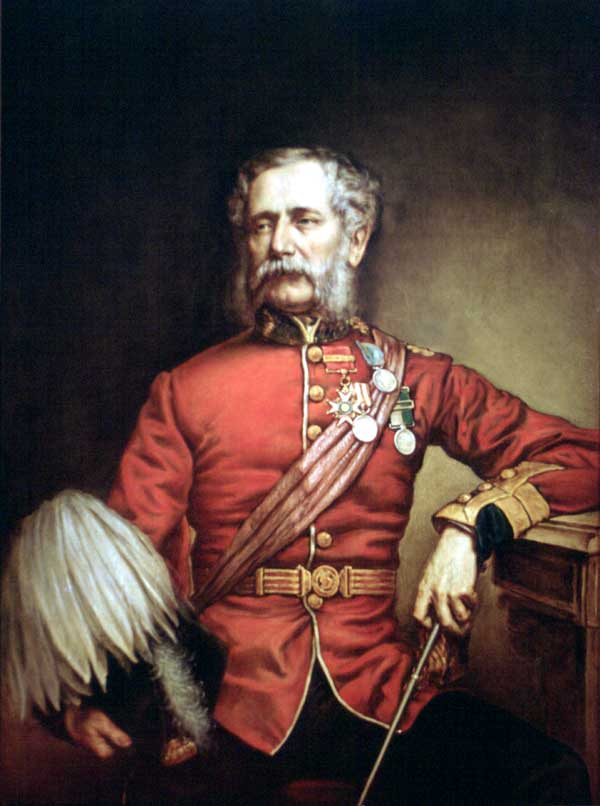
Lieutenant Governor Henry William Stisted of Ontario, 1867–68

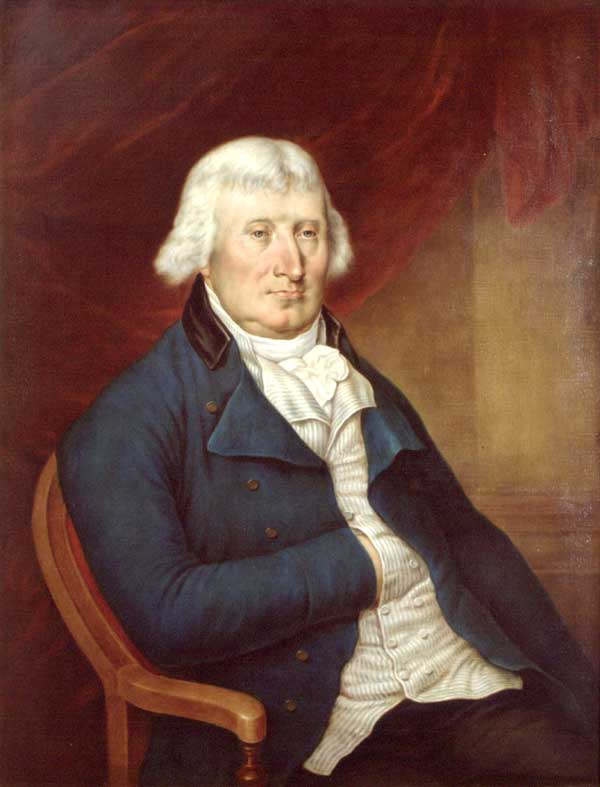
Peter Russell (politician) President and Admin of Upper Canada, 1796–99, ca 1882

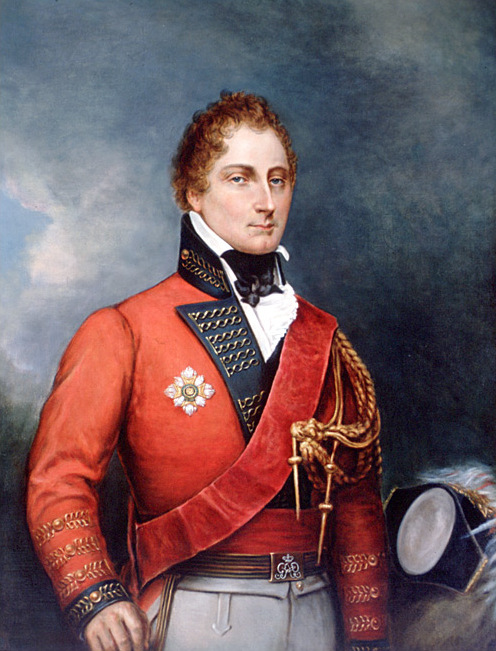
Lieutenant Governor Gordon Drummond of Ontario

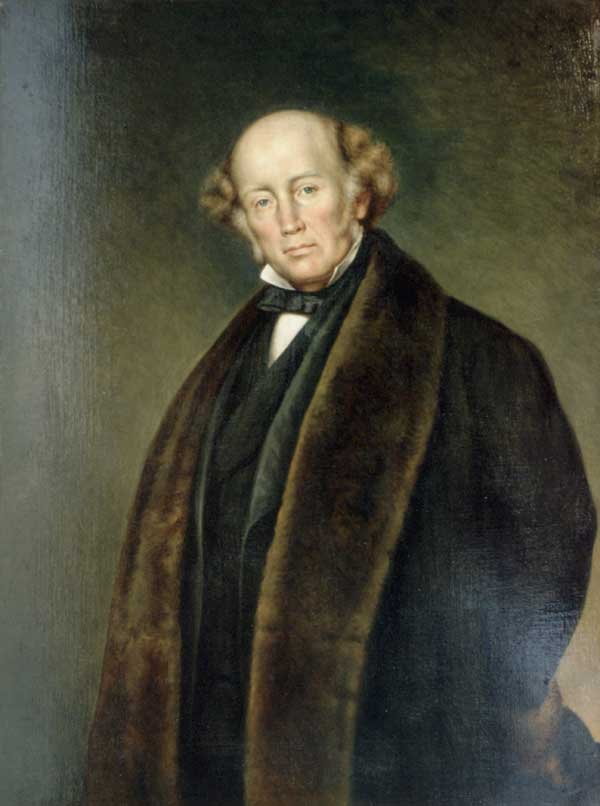
Sir Edmund Walker Head, Governor General of the Province of Canada, 1854–1861
