= Napoleon Receiving the Senate Deputies in Berlin =

Painting by René Théodore Berthon

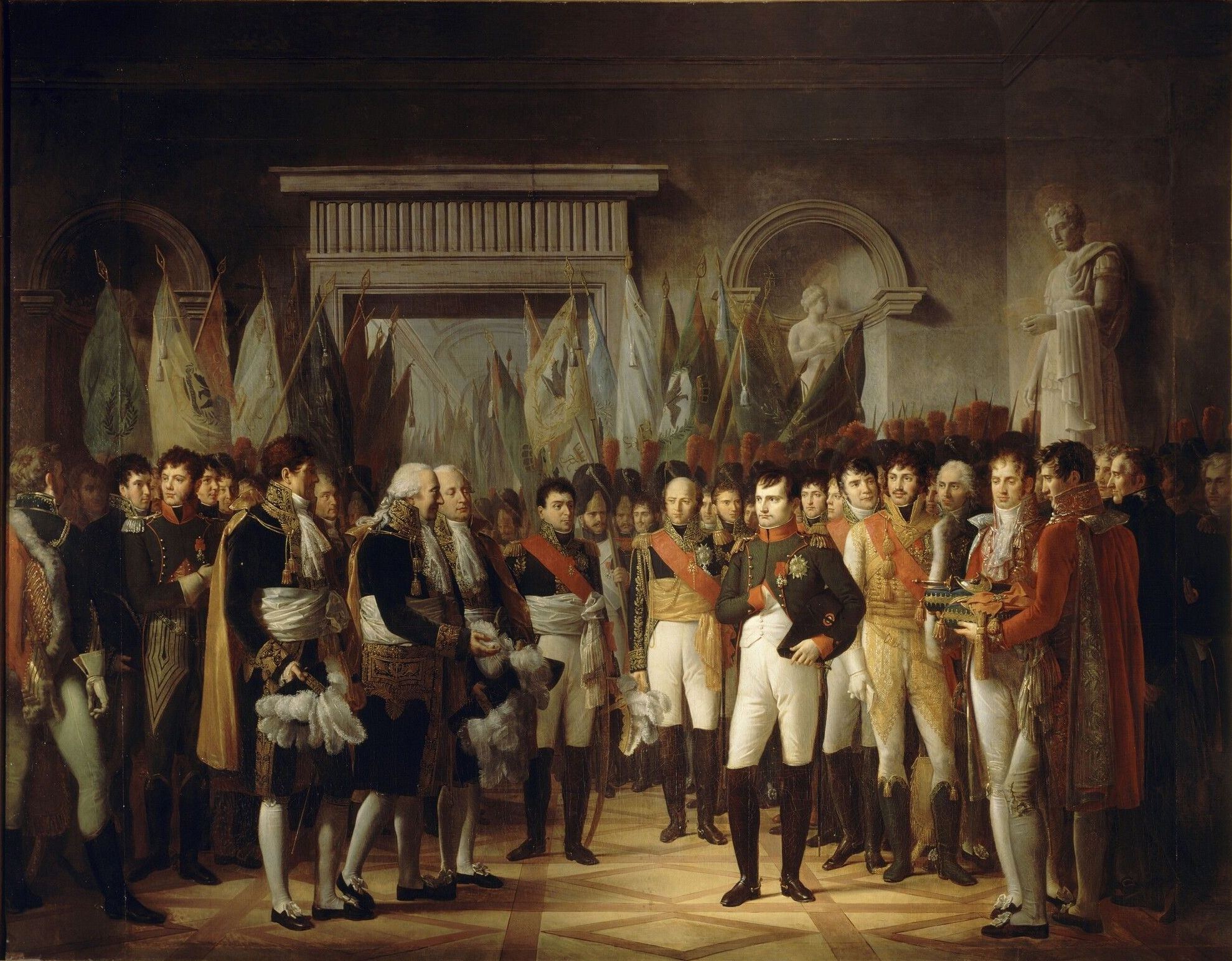
- Artist: René Théodore Berthon
- Year: 1808
- Type: Oil on canvas, history painting
- Dimensions: 363 cm × 493 cm (143 in × 194 in)
- Location: Palace of Versailles; Versailles

Napoleon Receiving the Senate Deputies in Berlin (French: Napoléon Ier reçoit au Palais Royal de Berlin, les députés du Sénat français, le 19 novembre 1806) is an 1808 history painting by the French artist René Théodore Berthon. It depicts a scene from November 1806 when Napoleon received a deputation from the French Senate at the Royal Palace in Berlin. It followed the Grande Armée's seizure of the Prussian capital in October 1806. Amongst those depicted in the painting are Joachim Murat, Jean-de-Dieu Soult, Louis-Nicolas Davout, Louis-Alexandre Berthier, Michel Ney, the Duke of Bassano and Caulaincourt.

The painting was exhibited at the Salon of 1808 held at the Louvre in Paris. Today the picture is in the collection of the Musée de l'Histoire de France at the Palace of Versailles.

== Bibliography ==
- Porterfield, Todd & Siegfried, Susan L. Staging Empire: Napoleon, Ingres, and David. Pennsylvania State University, 2006.
