= Marmion Savage =

Irish novelist and journalist

Marmion Wilme Savage (1803–1872), also known as Marmion Wilard Savage, was an Irish novelist and journalist.

== Life ==
He was son of the Rev. Henry Savage. He matriculated as a pensioner on 6 October 1817 at Trinity College, Dublin, obtaining a scholarship in 1822, and graduating B.A. in the autumn of 1824. On leaving the university he held for some time in Dublin a position under the Irish government.

Savage was in 1856 appointed editor of The Examiner in succession to John Forster, and moved to London. He remained editor for around three years. He died at Torquay, after a prolonged illness, on 1 May 1872.

== Works ==
His first novel The Falcon Family, or Young Ireland, appeared in 1845, at the moment when the physical force party were just beginning to secede from the Repeal Association. It was a caustic attack on the seceders. His second work, The Bachelor of the Albany, which was published in 1847, proved to be his best known. In 1849 Savage brought out a three-volume novel, called My Uncle the Curate, and in 1852 another entitled Reuben Medlicott, or the Coming Man. His fifth story was a novelette, called Clover Cottage, or I can't get in, which, dramatised by Tom Taylor under the title of Nine Points of the Law, as a comedietta in one act, was first performed at the Olympic on 11 April 1859, with Mrs. Stirling and Addison in the two chief parts.

In 1855 he edited, in two volumes with notes and a preface, Richard Lalor Sheil's Sketches, Legal and Political, which had appeared as a serial in the New Monthly Magazine, under the editorship of Thomas Campbell. In 1870 he brought out his sixth and last novel, entitled The Woman of Business, or the Lady and the Lawyer.

== Family ==
He was twice married. By his first wife, Olivia, daughter of Olivia Owenson and niece of Lady Morgan, to whom the novelist dedicated his Bachelor of the Albany, he had an only son, who died in youth. By his second wife, a daughter of Thomas Hutton of Dublin, Narissa Rosavo (1818-91), who was also an author of short stories for Argosy (UK magazine). They had no children.
