= René Théodore Berthon =

French painter (1776–1859)

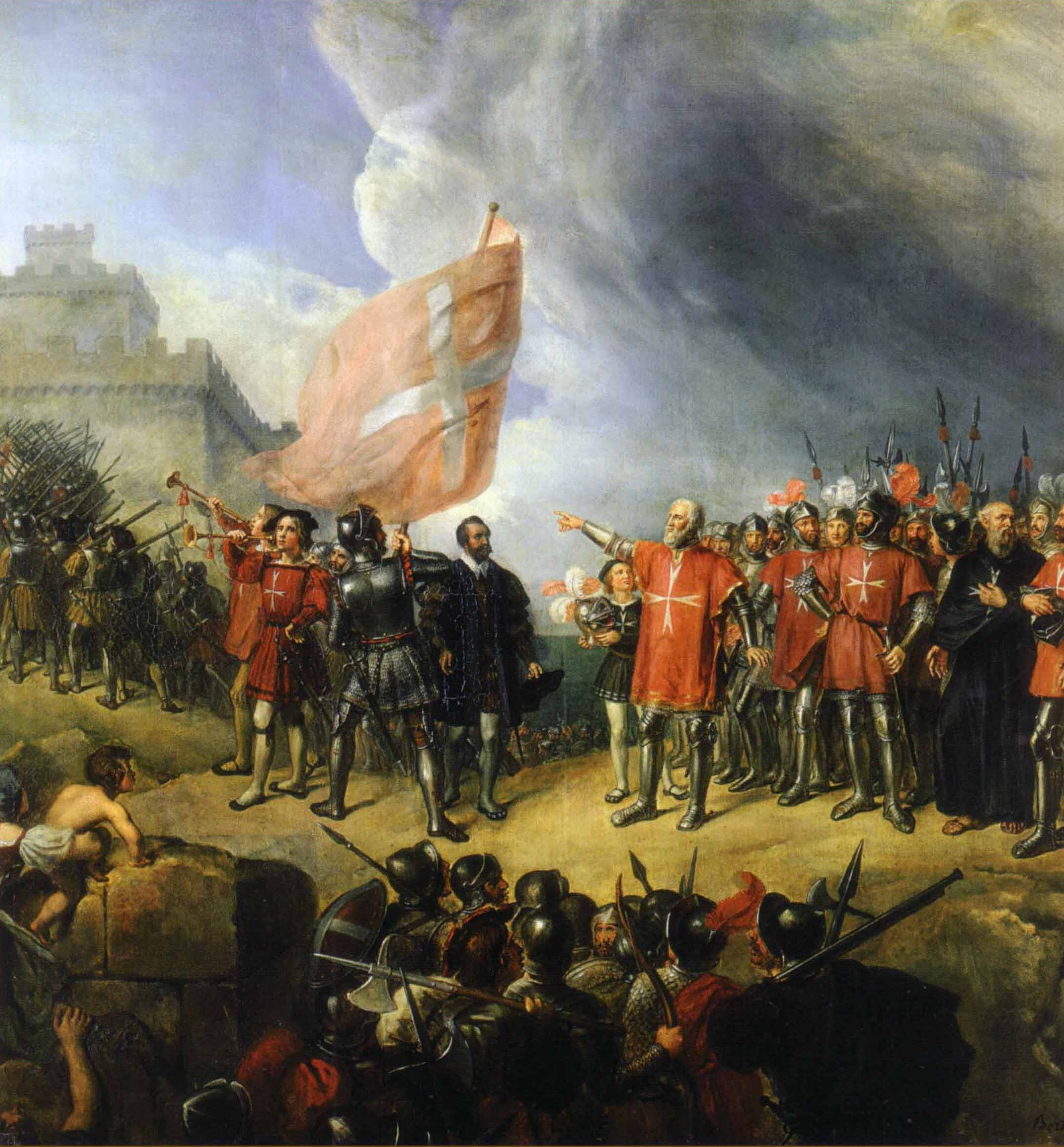
The Capture of Malta in 1530 by Philippe Villiers de L'Isle-Adam, Grand Master of the Order of Knights Hospitaller, now at the Palace of Versailles.

René Théodore Berthon (1776–1859) was a French painter of religious and historical subjects, and of portraits.

== Life ==
Berthon was born at Tours in 1776, and studied under David. He painted scriptural and historical subjects, and a large number of portraits, which, although of no great merit, gained him a certain reputation in the days of the first empire and the restoration. Among his portraits are those of Napoleon I when First Consul, Pauline Bonaparte, Mademoiselle Duchesnois, and Lady Morgan. Several of his historical pictures are at Versailles. He died in Paris in 1859.

His daughter, Sidonie Berthon, a miniature painter, was a pupil of her father and of Mme de Mirbel. She was born in Paris in 1817, and died in 1871. His son, George Théodore Berthon, was a portrait artist who emigrated to England and then to Canada.

== Gallery ==
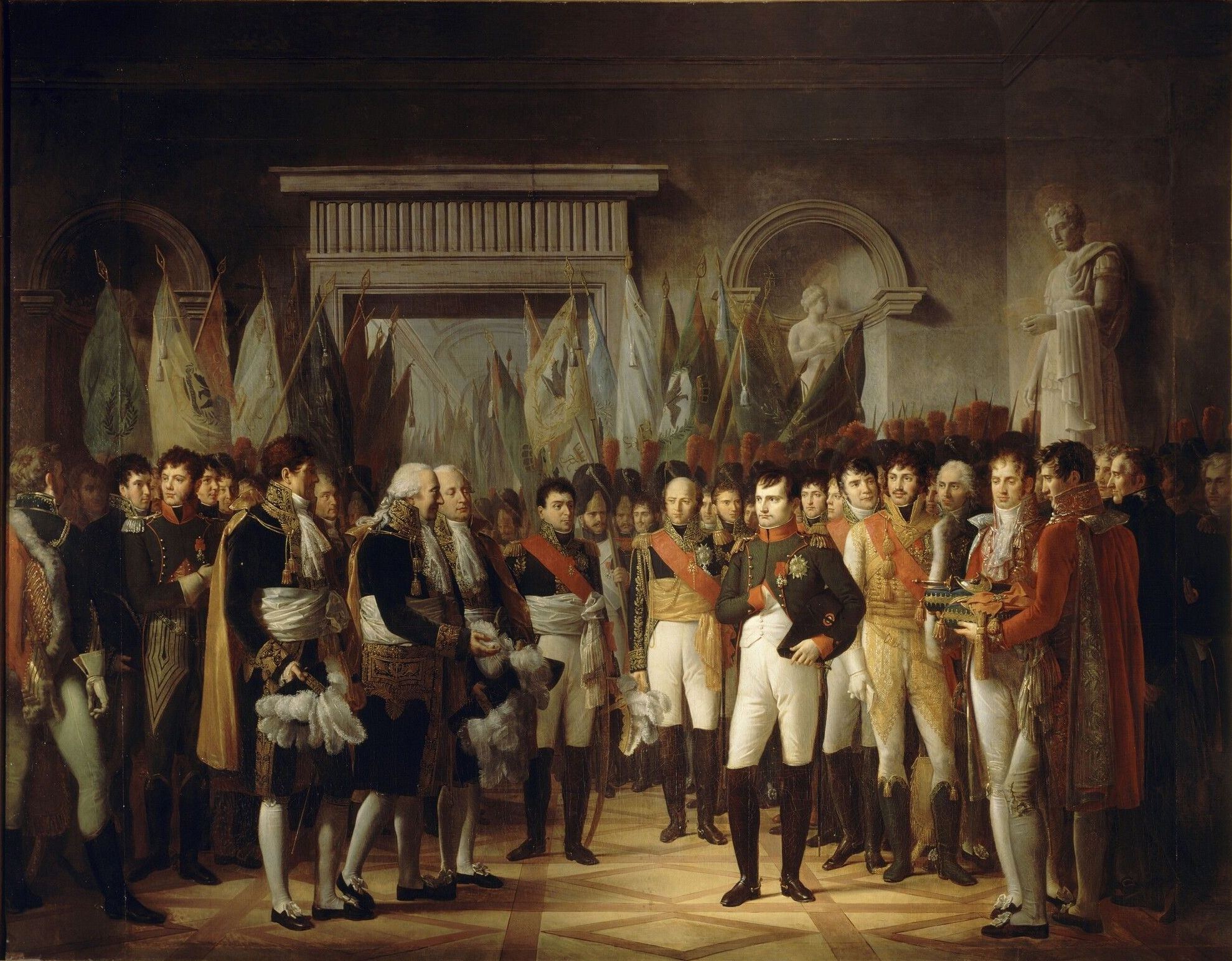
Napoleon Receiving the Senate Deputies in Berlin, 1808

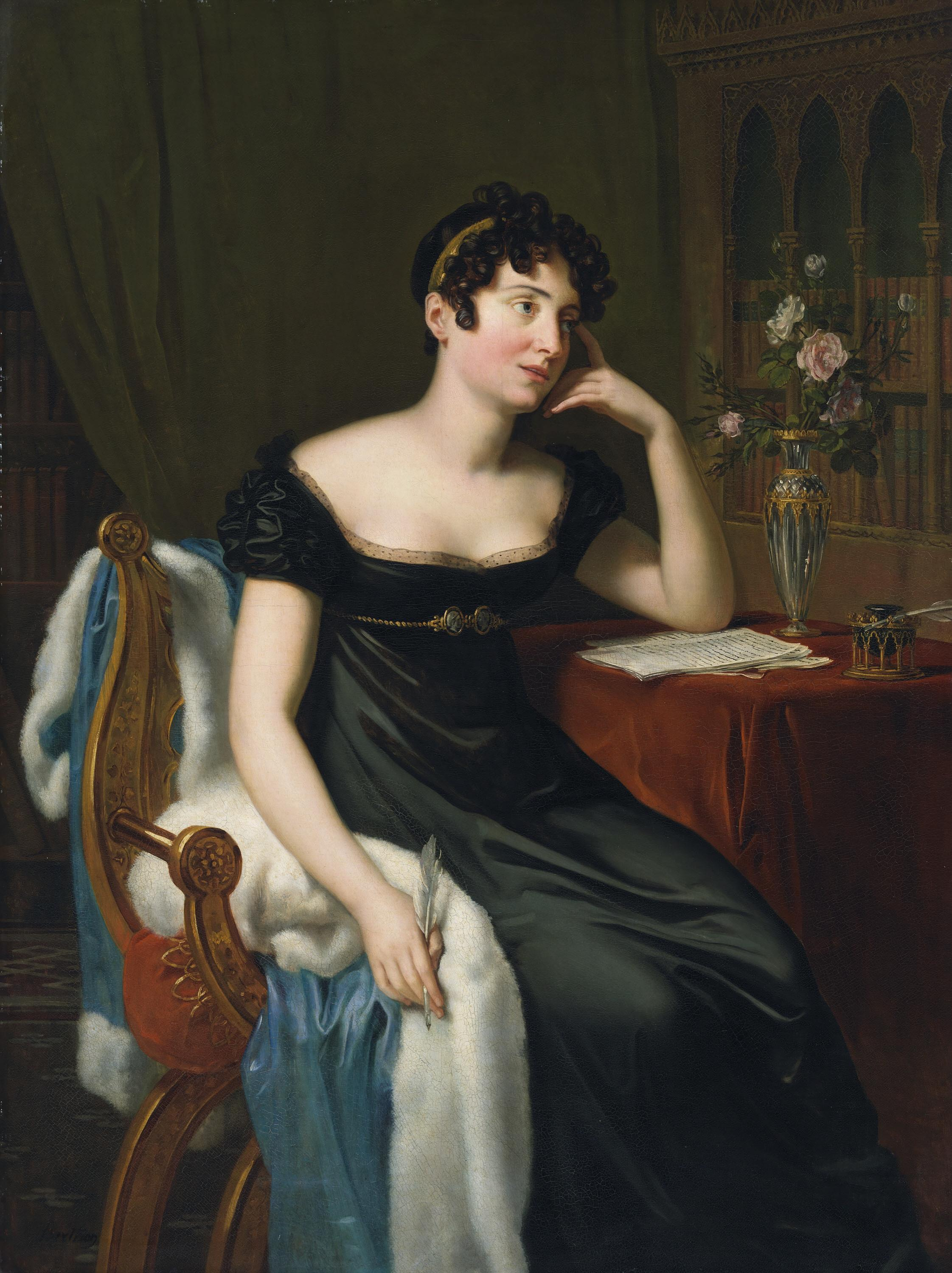
Portrait of Lady Morgan, 1818
