= Thomas Charles Morgan =

English physician and writer (1783–1843)

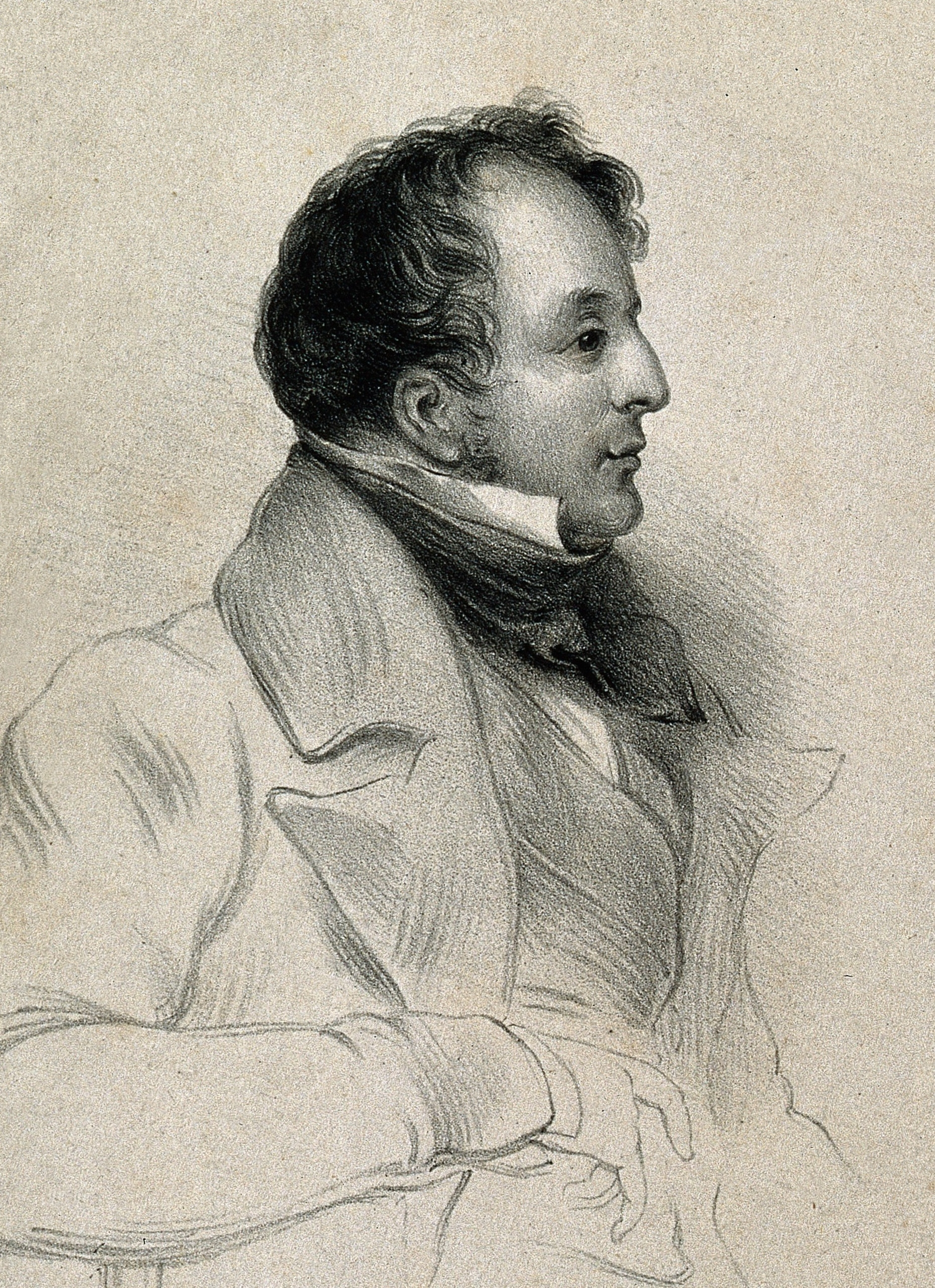
Thomas Charles Morgan

Sir Thomas Charles Morgan (1783 – 28 August 1843) was a British physician and writer with an interest in philosophical and miscellaneous subject matter. His wife was the novelist Lady Morgan.

== Early life ==
Morgan was born in Charlotte Street, Bloomsbury, a son of one John Morgan, and was raised in Smithfield, London. As a young man, he was given an annual income of £300. He studied at Eton and Cambridge and graduated from Peterhouse in 1809. He established a medical practice in London where the focus of his work was the study of cowpox and smallpox. He was a friend and supporter of Edward Jenner. He was accepted to the Royal College of Physicians of London in 1810.

== Career ==
After the death of his first wife in 1810, he moved to Ireland with his daughter where he took a post as physician to John Hamilton, 1st Marquess of Abercorn. He was knighted in Ireland in 1811. Of his knighthood, Lady Morgan's biographer wrote:

It was an act of courtesy on the part of his Grace the Duke of Richmond to Lord Abercorn to confer knighthood on his family physician, who had done nothing to deserve it on public grounds. Morgan, himself, cared nothing about it; but to please Miss Owenson he would have been content to pass under any denomination.

From 1815 to 1817 the Morgans toured France and Lady Morgan subsequently published two historical works, France (1817), and Italy (1821), to which Thomas wrote appendices. These were popular works. They later shared credit (in 1841) for a two-volume work enigmatically titled The Book without a Name. It was a collection of previously published articles and essays.

During Morgan's residence in Ireland he devoted much of his time and talents to the cause of Catholic Emancipation, which he advocated in the public journals and periodicals. He was a lover of civil and religious liberty, and his homes in Dublin and London were, according to William Munk, "always open to sufferers in that cause from whatever land they came."

His own works included Sketches of the Philosophy of Life (1818), a scientific work, and Sketches of the Philosophy of Morals (1822) which offered a rebuttal to criticism of his first work, notably, that of Thomas Rennell. He also contributed articles to several magazines including The New Monthly Magazine and The Metropolitan Magazine.

In 1835 he was made commissioner of Irish fisheries and in July published a short story called "Glimpses of Other Worlds" that told of a high pressure steam balloon that travels to the moon. The Morgans moved to William Street, Lowndes Square, London.

In England, he was appointed physician to the Marshalsea prison.

== Personal life ==
He married a Miss Hammond but she died in childbirth in 1810. Their surviving daughter was:

- Anne Hammond Morgan (1810–1850), who married Lt. Col. St. John Blacker. After his death in 1842, she married Maj. Hon. George Augustus Browne, a son of James Browne, 2nd Baron Kilmaine and Hon. Anne Cavendish (a daughter of Sir Henry Cavendish, 2nd Baronet and Sarah Cavendish, 1st Baroness Waterpark).

Through Abercorn's wife, the Marchioness Lady Anne Jane Gore, engineered an introduction to the Irish novelist Sydney Owenson (1776–1859) who had become famous for The Wild Irish Girl (1806). She was several years his senior. They married in January 1812, and she was henceforth known as Lady Morgan. After their marriage the couple lived in Barons Court, the Abercorn seat, before eventually moving to Dublin.

Thomas Morgan died in London on 28 August 1843.
