= The Wild Irish Girl =

1806 novel by Sydney Owenson

The Wild Irish Girl: A National Tale
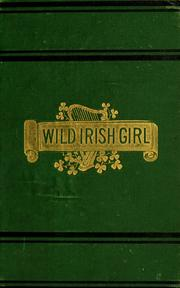
- Author: Sydney Owenson (Lady Morgan)
- Language: English
- Genre: Romance, epistolary
- Publication date: 1806
- Publication place: United Kingdom
- Media type: Print (Hardback & Paperback)
- Pages: 304 pp. (Oxford University Press paperback edition)
- ISBN: 0-19-283283-2 (Oxford University Press paperback edition)
- OCLC: 40150638

The Wild Irish Girl; a National Tale is an epistolary novel written by Irish novelist Sydney Owenson (later Lady Morgan) in 1806.

== Plot ==
The Hon. Horatio M———, the younger son of the Earl of M———, is banished to his father's estate on the northwest coast of Connacht (i.e. County Sligo) as punishment for accumulating large debts, neglecting his legal studies, and "presiding as the high priest of libertinism at the nocturnal orgies of vitiated dissipation" during his life in London. The novel is primarily epistolary, and its story unfolds via letters written by Horatio to his friend J.D., an MP. In Ireland, Horatio finds a dilapidated castle and the remnants of the Catholic Gaelic nobility that was displaced by his ancestors after the Cromwellian conquest of Ireland. Living in the castle are the Prince of Inismore, his daughter, the beautiful and talented Glorvina, and their devoted Catholic priest, Father John. Horatio ends up staying with the family under the assumed character of a penniless artist, as he does not want to betray his family's role in displacing the Prince of Inismore's family (technically referred to as the O’Melvilles, although the Prince refuses such a mundane title). Through conversations with the family, Horatio learns a new respect for Irish history and culture, which Owenson underscores in extensive footnotes, made in the seemingly objective voice of an editor; these footnotes both expand on and defend the Irish cultural and historical arguments made by the Prince and Glorvina. Horatio and Glorvina also begin to fall in love, and their interactions demonstrate the novel's indebtedness to/possible parodying of the tradition of sensibility. Their courtship gets halted by Horatio's father's plan to marry his son to a wealthy heiress, and by the existence of a mysterious suitor for Glorvina's hand. A seemingly omniscient third-person narrator takes charge of the denouement, explaining how Horatio gets saved from having to make this mercenary marriage when his intended runs off. At almost the same time, the Prince dies, and Glorvina's mysterious suitor is revealed to be Horatio's father, the Earl of M———, who had also been using a secret identity to cultivate a relationship with the Prince in order to make reparations for his forefathers’ crimes. However, the Earl reveals that he was only intending to marry Glorvina out of obligation but not love and is therefore very happy to let Horatio marry her instead. The novel ends with a return to the epistolary mode: the Earl of M——— writes to Horatio, explaining his history with the Prince's family, and exhorting Horatio to be a responsible husband and landlord. Finally, the text implies that this potentially happy and fruitful individual union between an English man and an Irish woman might also augur a happy future for the recent union of their two countries.

== Reception ==
The novel instantly became a favorite in England, and went through seven editions in less than two years. In America, it reached its fourth edition by 1807. The book's popularity spawned a line of fashion accessories, such as the "Glorvina ornament" brooch named after the heroine.
