= Robert Owenson =

Irish actor and writer (1744–1812)

Robert Owenson (Robert MacOwen) (1744–1812) was an Irish actor, author and father of poet Olivia, Lady Clarke and novelist Sydney, Lady Morgan.

== Career ==
Born in Tirawley, on the Mayo–Sligo county border, Owenson established a National Theatre Music Hall at Fishamble Street, Dublin, the theatre where Handel's Messiah had been first performed in 1742. Here plays and songs were performed in English and in Irish. Owenson was introduced as an actor by Oliver Goldsmith and David Garrick; he had his London debut at Covent Garden in 1774 and became associated with the English writer Samuel Johnson. He opened his Dublin theatre at Fishamble Street in 1785. Owenson's elder daughter, the novelist Sydney, Lady Morgan wrote of his theatre: "The National Theatre Music Hall": ‘The first performance [of the National Theatre at Fishamble St.] was to be altogether national, that is, Irish, and very Irish it was. My father wrote and spoke the prologue in his own character as an Irish Volunteer. The audience was as national as the performance; and the pit was filled with red coats of the corps to which my father belonged; and the boxes exhibited a show of beauty and fashion, such as Ireland above all countries could produce." His younger daughter was dramatist and poet Olivia Owenson. The enormously successful theatre was shut when the British government granted an exclusive patent to a less nationally minded competitor, Richard Daly, for whom Owenson subsequently worked. The contemporary writer Jonah Barrington described him as "considerably above six feet in height, remarkably handsome and brave looking, vigorous and well shaped." When he died in 1812, the Freeman's Journal wrote in an obituary: "The revival of Irish music within these last thirty years was entirely owing to his exertion, and his exquisite mode of singing his native airs both in public and in private. His conduct as a father... went far beyond the common line of parental duty and tenderness; his public life considered, it was unexampled."
