= Patrick Murray (theologian) =

Irish theologian (1811–1882)

Patrick Aloysius Murray
- Born: 1811; Clones, County Monaghan, Ireland
- Died: 1882 (aged 70–71); Maynooth, County Kildare, Ireland
- Education: Maynooth College
- Occupations: Theologian, writer

Patrick Aloysius Murray DD STP (1811–1882) was an Irish Roman Catholic theologian.

== Life ==
Murray was born in Clones, County Monaghan, Ireland. He was educated at Maynooth College, he was elected a Dunboyne, or senior student, 1835. He received a curacy in Dublin, was appointed professor of English and French in Maynooth, 1838, and became professor of theology there, 1841. The remainder of his life he devoted mainly to theological science. In 1879, he was made prefect of the Dunboyne Establishment, a position he held until his death.

Murray wrote for the Dublin Review and for magazines, besides publishing four volumes called Essays, Chiefly Theological. His greatest work was De Ecclesia Christi, a masterpiece in positive and controversial theology.

In 1849, Scottish essayist Thomas Carlyle visited Ireland at the request of Young Ireland leader Charles Gavan Duffy. During the first days of Carlyle's journey, while Carlyle was still in Dublin, Duffy invited Carlyle to breakfast with Dr. Murray and several other friends. According to Carlyle, the conversation was consistently about "Ireland versus England," with Duffy and Murray being in a "sad, unreasonable humor" on the topic which "pervad[ed] all the Irish population on this matter" (p. 50). Carlyle describes Murray as a "big burly mass of Catholic Irishism" (Reminiscences of My Irish Journey in 1849, p. 50). Carlyle continues: "Dr. Murray, head cropped like stubble, red-skinned face, harsh gray Irish eyes; full of fiery Irish zeal, too, and rage, which, however, he had the art to keep down under buttery-vocables: man of considerable strength, man not to be 'loved' by any manner of means!" (ibid., p. 50).

Murray died at Maynooth College, on 15 November 1882, and is buried in the College Cemetery.
