= Olivia Owenson, Lady Clarke =

Irish poet and dramatist

- Born: Olivia Owenson; 1785; Dublin, Ireland
- Died: 24 April 1845 (aged 59–60); Dublin
- Resting place: Irishtown, Dublin
- Occupations: dramatist, governess, poet
- Spouse: Dr Sir Arthur Clarke (m. 1808)
- Children: 3
- Writing career
- Language: English
- Notable works: The Irishwoman, a comedy in five acts (1819)

Olivia, Lady Clarke (née Owenson; 1785 – 24 April 1845), was a poet and Irish dramatist, best known as the author of The Irishwoman, a comedy in five acts.

== Early life and education ==
Olivia Owenson was born in Dublin in 1785 to Robert Owenson and Jane Hill. Her father was an Irish Catholic and a professional actor while her mother was the Protestant daughter of a merchant from Shrewsbury. In 1776 her parents moved from Great Britain to Ireland and settled in Dublin where Owenson earned a living by performing in theatres around Dublin, Drumcondrath, and Sligo. Their eldest daughter was born in 1778, named Sydney. She went on to become a well known novelist. Clarke initially grew up in Dublin on Dame Street with her sister. However her mother died in 1789 and she and her sister were sent away to school. Clarke attended Madame Terson's school in Clontarf and later attended Mrs Anderson's finishing school in Dublin. Once school was complete the sisters joined their father in Kilkenny for several years. Clarke got a position as a governess for the Brownrigg family where she met the doctor who became her husband.

== Career ==
Clarke wrote poetry for various periodicals in Dublin including Metropolitan Magazine, The Comic Offering and Athenaeum. She was known for her satirical verse. Clarke and held salons in her home in North Great George's Street. She also remained in touch with the theater and produced the play The Irishwoman in 1819 at the Theatre Royal, Dublin. She had three daughters who survived her, Sydney, Olivia, and Josephine. They inherited her sister's estate and maintained her correspondence. Her daughter Olivia married Marmion Savage. Clarke died on 24 April 1845. She was buried with her father in Irishtown, Dublin. Her husband died in 1857.

== Bibliography ==
- The Irishwoman, (1819)
- Parodied on popular songs, (1836)
