= The Missionary: An Indian Tale =

The Missionary: An Indian Tale (1811) is a sentimental romance novella by Irish author Sydney Owenson (described on the title-page as "Miss Owenson"). The book presents a love story, marked by tragedy, between a Western clergyman and an Indian princess. This forbidden love symbolizes the clash of cultures, with much of the narrative set in the Kashmir Valley, India, during a period of intense political turmoil and religious fervor.

Percy Bysshe Shelley admired The Missionary intensely and Owenson's heroine is said to have influenced some of his own orientalist productions.

The author later revised the work, shortly before her death in 1859, renaming it Luxima, the Prophetess.
