= Sydney, Lady Morgan =

Irish novelist

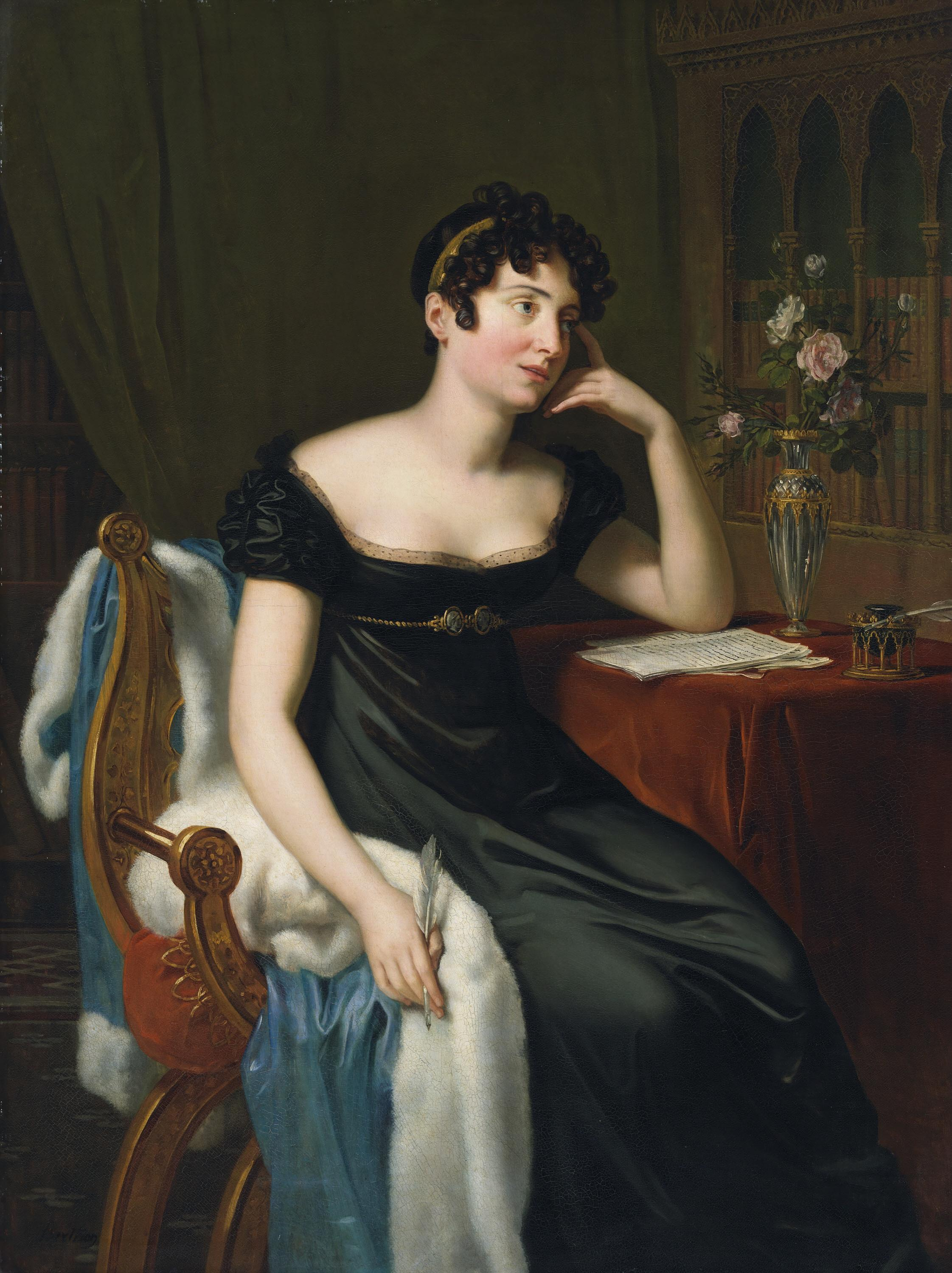
- Portrait of Lady Morgan by René Théodore Berthon, 1818
- Born: Sydney Owenson c. 1778; Either Dublin, Ireland or the Irish Sea
- Died: 14 April 1859 (aged ~80); London, United Kingdom
- Resting place: Brompton Cemetery
- Occupations: Novelist, governess
- Spouse: Thomas Charles Morgan (m. 1812)
- Writing career
- Pen name: Glorvina
- Language: English
- Period: 1804–59
- Notable work: The Wild Irish Girl (1806)

Sydney, Lady Morgan (née Owenson; c. 1778 – 14 April 1859), was an Irish novelist, best known for The Wild Irish Girl (1806), a romantic, and some critics suggest, "proto-feminist", novel with political and patriotic overtones. Her work, including continental travelogues, sparked controversy and faced censorship. She counted Percy Bysshe Shelley and Lord Byron among her defenders.

== Early life ==
Sydney Owenson was the daughter of Robert Owenson, alias MacOwen, and Jane Hill. Robert Owenson was an Irish Catholic and a professional actor, noted for his comedic performances. He had been raised in London, and while in England he met and married Jane Hill, the Protestant daughter of a trader from Shrewsbury. In 1776 Owenson and his wife returned to Ireland for good. The couple settled in Dublin and Owenson earned a living by performing in theatres around Dublin, Drumcondra, and Sligo. Around 1778 the couple gave birth to Sydney, who was named after her paternal grandmother. The exact date of Sydney's birth remains unknown; one of Sydney's idiosyncrasies was that she was prone to be elusive about her actual age. Later in life, she would claim that she was born on 25 December 1785, a fabrication she maintained to such an extent that even on her death certificate there is no certainty about her age, stating that she was "about 80 years".

Sydney spent the earliest years of her childhood at the Owensons' home at 60 Dame Street in Dublin with her mother Jane and sister Olivia. Sydney was primarily educated by her mother, but she also received tutoring from a young boy named Thomas Dermody, a local prodigy whom their father had rescued from poverty. Her mother died in 1789 when Sydney was about ten years old, and her father sent her and her sister away to private schools to finish their education. Sydney spent three years at a Huguenot academy at Clontarf and then attended a finishing school in Earl Street, Dublin. After completing school Sydney moved with her father to Sligo.

In 1798 the Owenson family was experiencing some financial hardships and Sydney was forced to leave home in search of employment. She was hired as a governess by the Featherstones of Bracklyn Castle, County Westmeath. In this environment, she blossomed into an avid reader, a capable conversationalist, and an unabashed performer of songs and dances. It was at this period in her life that she began her writing career.

== Career ==
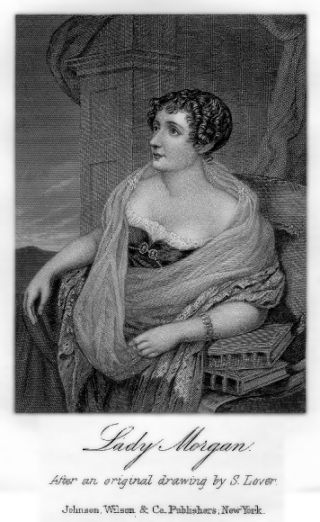
Lady Morgan, stipple and line engraving by Robert Cooper, 1825, after Samuel Lover

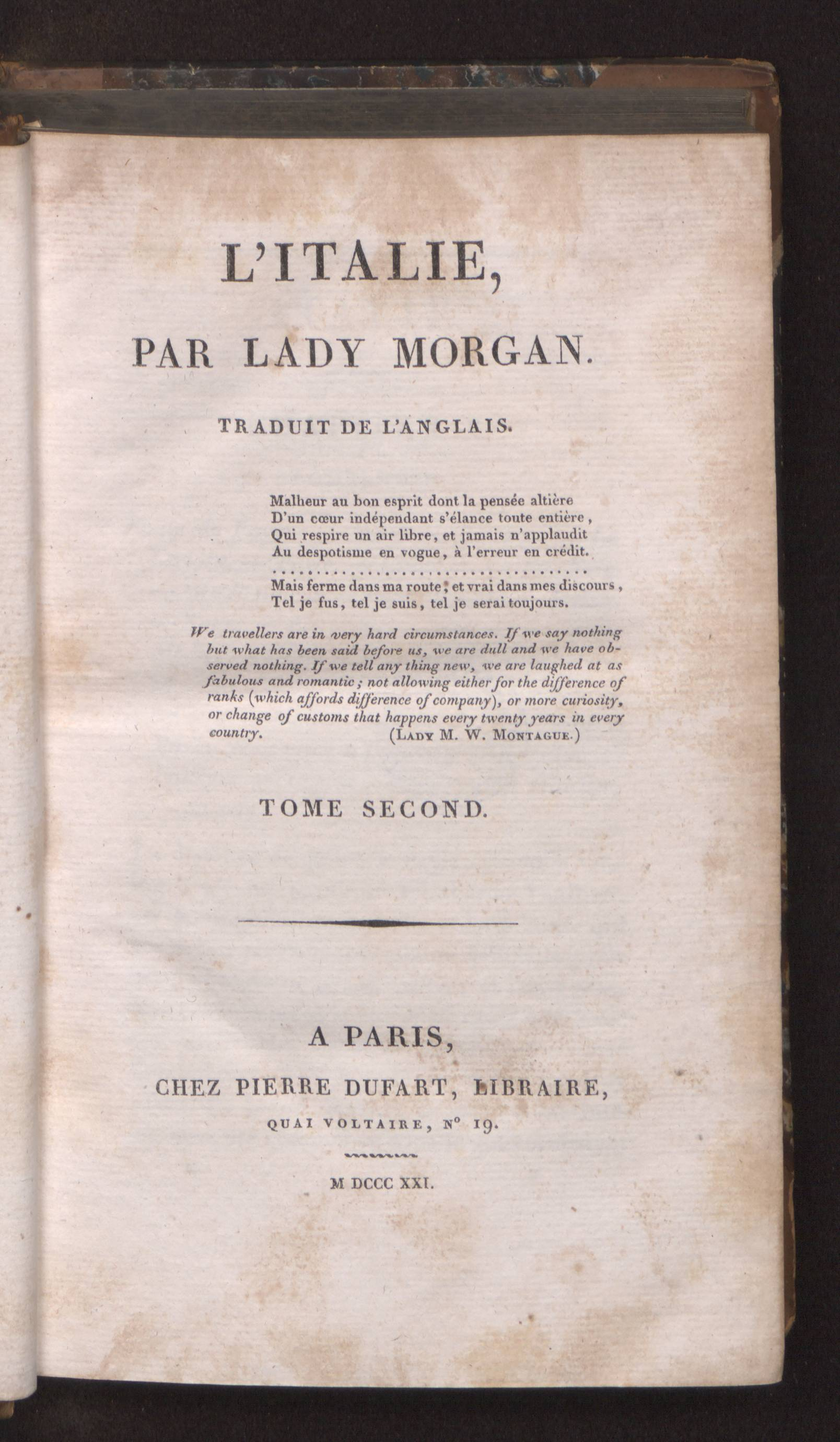
Italie, t. 2, 1821

She was one of the most vivid and hotly discussed literary figures of her generation. She began her career with a precocious volume of poems. She collected Irish tunes, for which she composed the words, thus setting a fashion adopted with signal success by Thomas Moore. Her novel St. Clair (1804), about ill-judged marriage, ill-starred love and impassioned nature worship, in which the influence of Johann Wolfgang von Goethe (specifically his novel The Sorrows of Young Werther) and Jean-Jacques Rousseau was apparent, at once attracted attention. Another novel, The Novice of St. Dominick (1806), was also praised for its qualities of imagination and description.

But the book which made her reputation and brought her name into warm controversy was The Wild Irish Girl (1806), in which she appeared as the ardent champion of her native country, a politician rather than a novelist, extolling the beauty of Irish scenery, the richness of the natural wealth of Ireland, and the noble traditions of its early history. Given the moral and intellectual strengths of her heroine, the novel's embodiment of Irish nationhood, Glorvina, it has also been described as "proto-feminist". In Catholic and Liberal circles she often referred as Gloria or Glorvina.

Patriotic Sketches and Metrical Fragments followed in 1807. She published The Missionary: An Indian Tale in 1811, revising it shortly before her death as Luxima, the Prophetess. Percy Bysshe Shelley admired The Missionary intensely and Owenson's heroine is said to have influenced some of his own orientalist productions.

Miss Owenson entered the household of John Hamilton, 1st Marquess of Abercorn, and in 1812 — persuaded by Lady Abercorn, the former Lady Anne Jane Gore — she married the philosopher and surgeon to the household, Sir Thomas Charles Morgan, but books continued to flow from her facile pen.

A blue plaque on the wall at the site of Lady Morgan's former home at Kildare Street, Dublin states that she lived there from 1813 to 1837. A Dublin Tourism brochure notes "Lady Morgan lived at No 35 (now No 39) Kildare Street. She gave lavish soirees and musical evenings at which Thomas Moore and the violinist Paganini were among the guests".

In 1814 she produced her best novel, O'Donnell. She was at her best in her descriptions of the poorer classes, of whom she had a thorough knowledge. Her elaborate study (1817) of France under the Bourbon Restoration was attacked with outrageous fury by John Wilson Croker in the Quarterly Review, the author being accused of Jacobinism, falsehood, licentiousness, and impiety. Her heroines were violently removed from what Croker considered their proper sphere as "a useful friend, a faithful wife, a tender mother, and a respectable and happy mistress of a family". Owenson took her revenge indirectly in the novel Florence Macarthy (1818) —translated into French by Jacques-Théodore Parisot—, in which a Quarterly reviewer, Con Crawley, is insulted with supreme feminine ingenuity.

Italy, a companion work to her France, was published in 1821 with appendices by her husband. It was proscribed by the King of Sardinia, the Emperor of Austria and the Pope, but Lord Byron bore testimony to the justness of its pictures of life. The results of Italian historical studies were given in her Life and Times of Salvator Rosa (1823). Then she turned again to Irish manners and politics with a matter-of-fact book on Absenteeism (1825), and a romantic novel with political overtones, The O'Briens and the O'Flahertys (1827). From William Lamb, Viscount Melbourne, Lady Morgan obtained a pension of £300. During the later years of her long life she published The Book of the Boudoir (1829), Dramatic Scenes from Real Life (1833), The Princess (1835), Woman and her Master (1840), The Book without a Name (1841), and Passages from my Autobiography (1859).

In 1838, Sir Thomas and Lady Morgan moved to a new home on the Cubitt estate, Knightsbridge, near Lowndes Square. Lady Morgan began a successful campaign to have a new gate opened into Hyde Park from Knightsbridge, the present day Albert Gate.

Sir Thomas died in 1843, and Lady Morgan died on 14 April 1859 (aged about 82) and was buried in Brompton Cemetery, London.

== Legacy ==
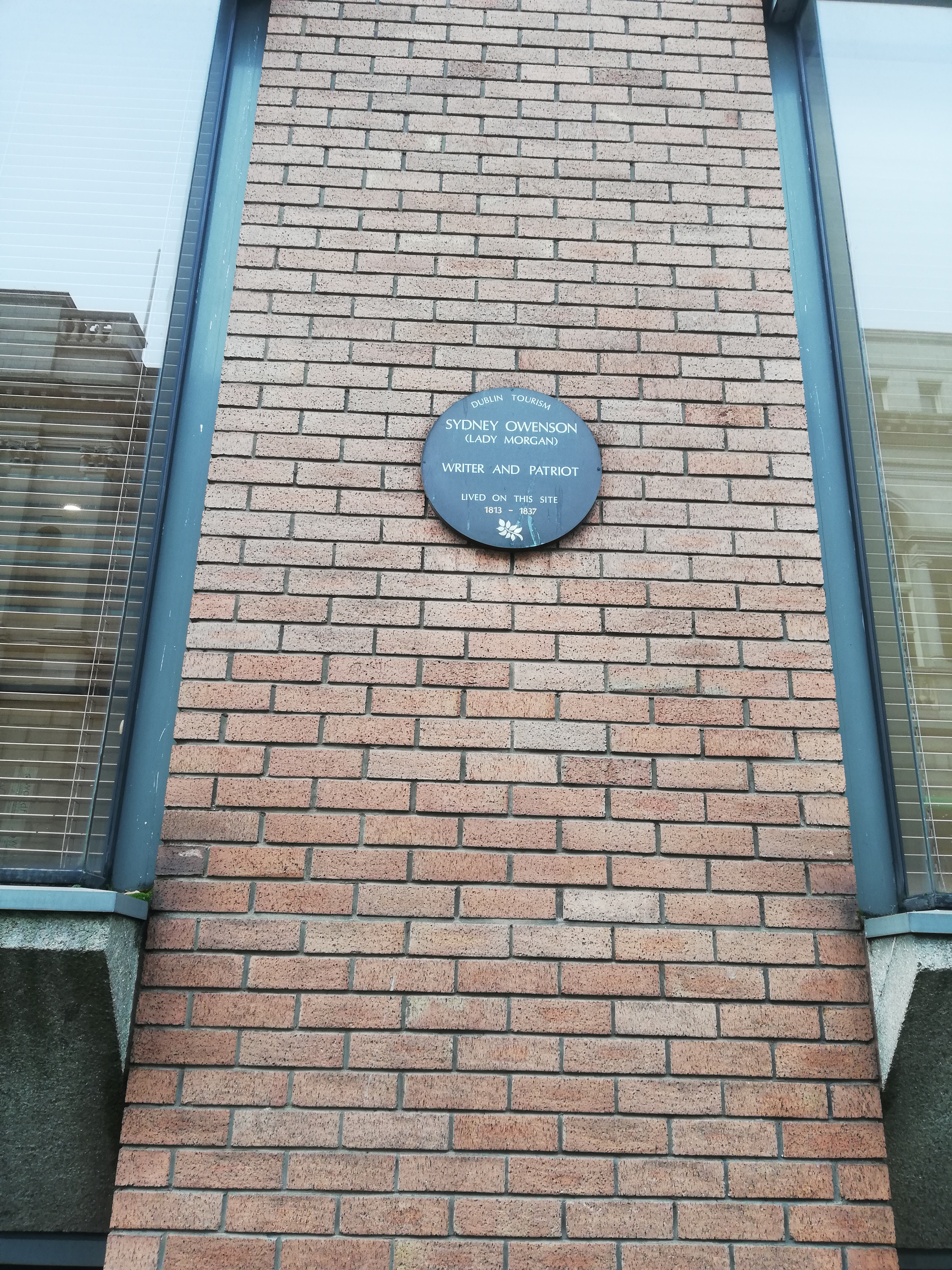
Blue plaque at Lady Morgan's former home on Kildare Street, Dublin

Before her death in 1859, Lady Morgan enlisted the help of her friend Geraldine Jewsbury to help write her memoirs. The two had originally met in 1853 when Jewsbury newly arrived in London. Lady Morgan became friends with Geraldine and helped her live a single life while in London. When Jewsbury wrote her friend's memoirs, she spoke of Lady Morgan's kindness and friendship in which she showed to Geraldine.

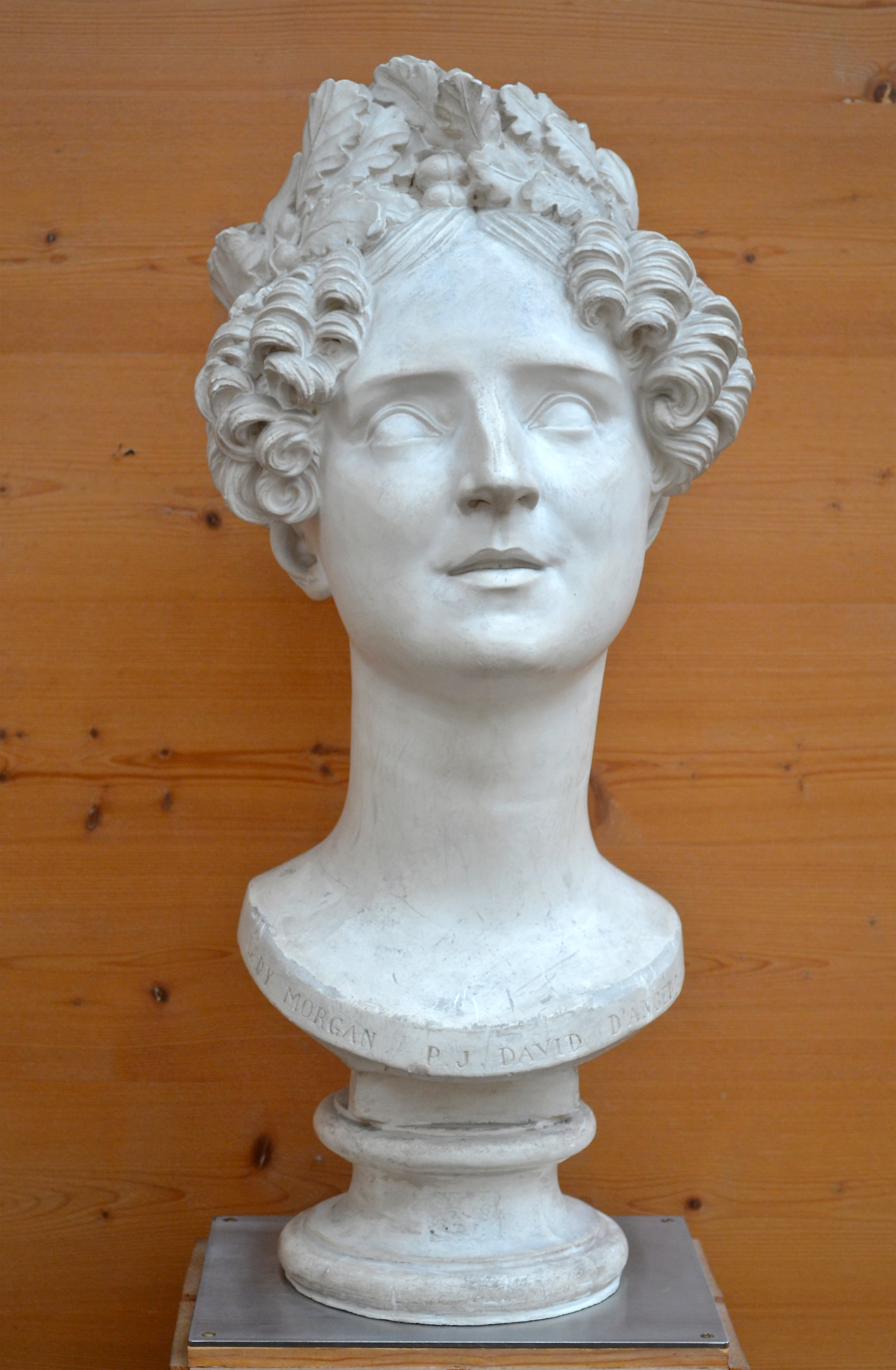
Bust of Lady Morgan by David d'Angers

Lady Morgan's autobiography and many interesting letters were edited with a memoir by William Hepworth Dixon in 1862.

There is a bust of Lady Morgan in the Victoria and Albert Museum in London. The plaque identifying the bust mentions that Lady Morgan was "less than four feet tall."

Another bust by David d'Angers is exhibited in his museum in Angers (France).

== Works ==
For a full list see Ricorso.

=== Novels ===
- St. Clair; or, First Love (1802)
- The Novice of St. Dominick (1806)
- The Wild Irish Girl (1806)
- Woman; or, Ida of Athens (1809)
- The Missionary: An Indian Tale (1811)
- O’Donnel: a National Tale (1814)
- Florence Macarthy: An Irish Tale (1818)
- The O’Briens and the O’Flahertys: A National Tale (1827)
- The Princess; or, The Beguine (1835)

=== Poetry ===
- Poems dedicated by permission to the Countess of Moira (1801)
- Twelve Original Hibernian Melodies (1805)
- The Lay of the Irish Harp; or, Metrical Fragments (1807)

=== Drama ===
- First Attempt; or, the Whim of the Moment (1807)

=== Autobiography ===
- Passages from My Autobiography (1859)
- Lady Morgan's Memoirs, Autobiographies, Diaries and Correspondence (1862)

=== Other ===
- A Few Reflections Occasioned by the Perusal of a Work entitled Familiar Epistles (1804)
- Patriotic Sketches of Ireland (1807)
- France (1817)
- Italy (1821)
- The Life and Times of Salvator Rosa (1824)
- Absenteeism (1825)
- The Book of the Boudoir (1829)
- France in 1829-1830 (1830)
- Dramatic Scenes of Real Life (1833)
- Review of Preferment; or, My Uncle the Earl, by Mrs. Gore (1839)
- Woman and Her Master (1840)
- The Book Without a Name (with Sir Charles Morgan) (1841)
- Letter to Cardinal Wiseman (1851)
