= 1693 in Ireland =

- Centuries: 15th; 16th; 17th; 18th; 19th
- Decades: 1670s; 1680s; 1690s; 1700s; 1710s
- See also: Other events of 1693; List of years in Ireland

Events from the year 1693 in Ireland.

== Incumbent ==
- Monarch: William III and Mary II

== Events ==
- 1 February – the 8th King's Royal Irish Hussars are raised by Colonel Henry Conyngham as Conyngham's dragoons.
- 9 March – the House of Commons of England presents an address to King William III complaining of mismanagement of Irish affairs. The Lord Lieutenant of Ireland, Viscount Sydney, is recalled on 13 June and administration left in the hands of Lords Justices.
- Huguenot cemetery, Dublin, is established.

== Arts and literature ==
- Vertue rewarded, or The Irish princess, an early romance novel set in Clonmel during the Williamite War in Ireland, is published in London.

== Births ==
- 13 August – Gustavus Handcock, politician (d. 1751)

== Deaths ==
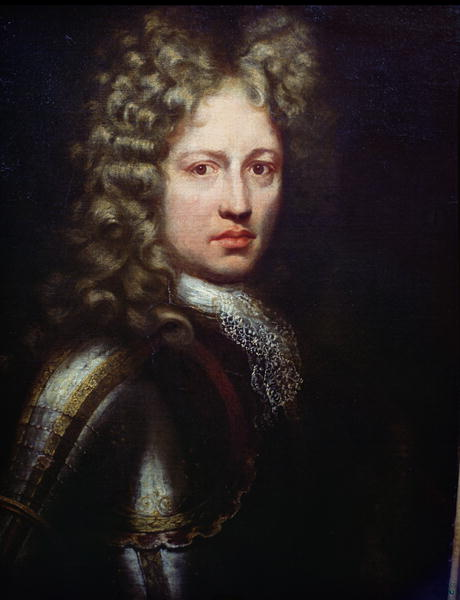
Patrick Sarsfield, 1st Earl of Lucan

- January – Edward FitzGerald-Villiers, soldier (b. c. 1654)
- 19 July (29 July, New Style) – John Barrett, soldier, killed in the French service at the Battle of Landen.
- 21 August – Patrick Sarsfield, 1st Earl of Lucan, Jacobite and soldier (b. c. 1660)
- Peter French, Dominican missionary and theologian.
