= 1685 in Ireland =

- Centuries: 15th; 16th; 17th; 18th; 19th
- Decades: 1660s; 1670s; 1680s; 1690s; 1700s
- See also: Other events of 1685; List of years in Ireland

Events from the year 1685 in Ireland.

== Incumbent ==
- Monarch: Charles II (until 6 February), then James II

== Events ==
- 6 February – James II becomes King of England, Scotland and Ireland upon the death of Charles II.
- 1 October – Henry Hyde, 2nd Earl of Clarendon, appointed Lord Lieutenant of Ireland.
- The 4th Royal Irish Dragoon Guards is raised as a cavalry regiment of the British Army, the Earl of Arran's Regiment of Cuirassiers, by the regimenting of various independent troops, and ranked as the 6th Regiment of Horse.

== Publications ==
- August? – the News-letter first published in Dublin.
- Rev. William Bedell's Old Testament translation into Irish, transcribed by Uilliam Ó Duinnín and revised by Rev. Narcissus Marsh with the aid of Jesuit scholars Andrew Sall and Paul Higgins and scientist Robert Boyle, is published posthumously in London in a new typeface designed by Sall and made by Joseph Moxon.
- Ruaidhrí Ó Flaithbheartaigh semi-mythical history of Ireland, Ogygia: seu Rerum Hibernicarum Chronologia & etc., is published.
- Sir William Petty's Hiberniae Delineatio, the first printed atlas of Ireland (based on his Down Survey of 1655–6) is published.

== Births ==
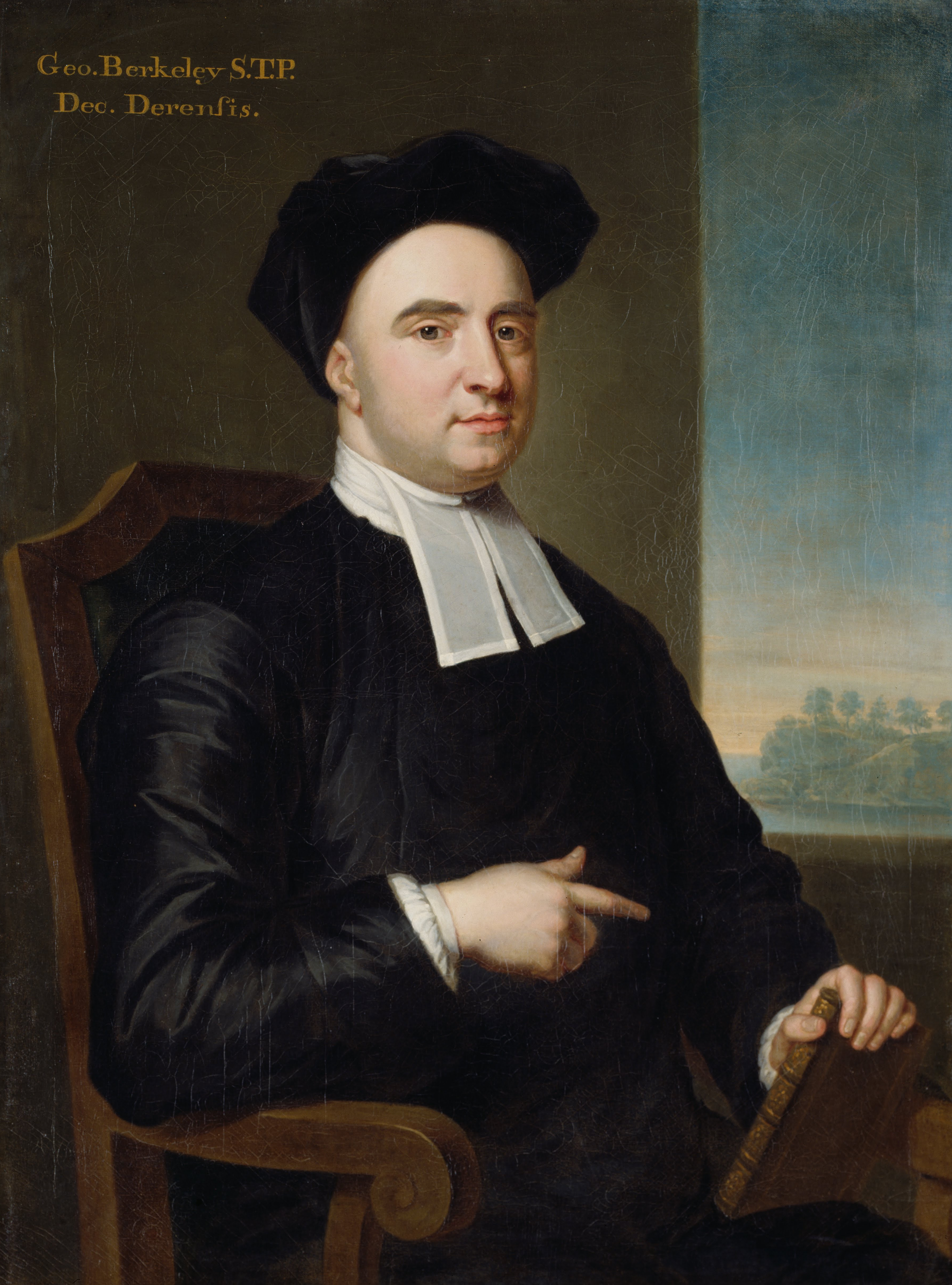
George Berkeley

- 11 March – William Flower, 1st Baron Castle Durrow, politician (d.1746).
- 12 March – Bishop George Berkeley, philosopher and writer (d.1753).
- Samuel Haliday, Presbyterian minister (d.1739).
- Henry Ponsonby, soldier and politician (d.1745).
- approximate date
  - Henry Colley, politician (d.1723/4).
  - Alexander Cosby, soldier in Nova Scotia (d.1742).
  - Edward England, born Edward Seegar, pirate (d.1720/1 in Madagascar)
  - Nicholas Taaffe, 6th Viscount Taaffe, Graf von Taaffe, soldier (d.1769).

== Deaths ==
- 17 March – Sir Richard Bulkeley, 1st Baronet, politician (b.1634).
- 18 March – Francis Harold, Franciscan scholar.
- William Alington, 3rd Baron Alington, peer (b. before 1641).
- John Eyre, Cromwellian settler and Mayor of Galway.
