= 1694 in Ireland =

- Centuries: 15th; 16th; 17th; 18th; 19th
- Decades: 1670s; 1680s; 1690s; 1700s; 1710s
- See also: Other events of 1694; List of years in Ireland

Events from the year 1694 in Ireland.

== Incumbent ==
- Monarch: William III and Mary II (until 28 December)

== Events ==
- French Huguenot refugees settle in Portarlington.
- 28 December – with the death of Queen Mary II, William III becomes sole monarch.

== Arts and literature ==
- 9 January – Henry Purcell's ode Great Parent, Hail! and John Blow's anthem I Beheld, and Lo! are performed in Christ Church Cathedral, Dublin, at a concert to mark the centenary of Trinity College.
- c. 25 October – Jonathan Swift is appointed to the Church of Ireland prebend of Kilroot, near Carrickfergus in County Antrim (until 1696).

== Births ==
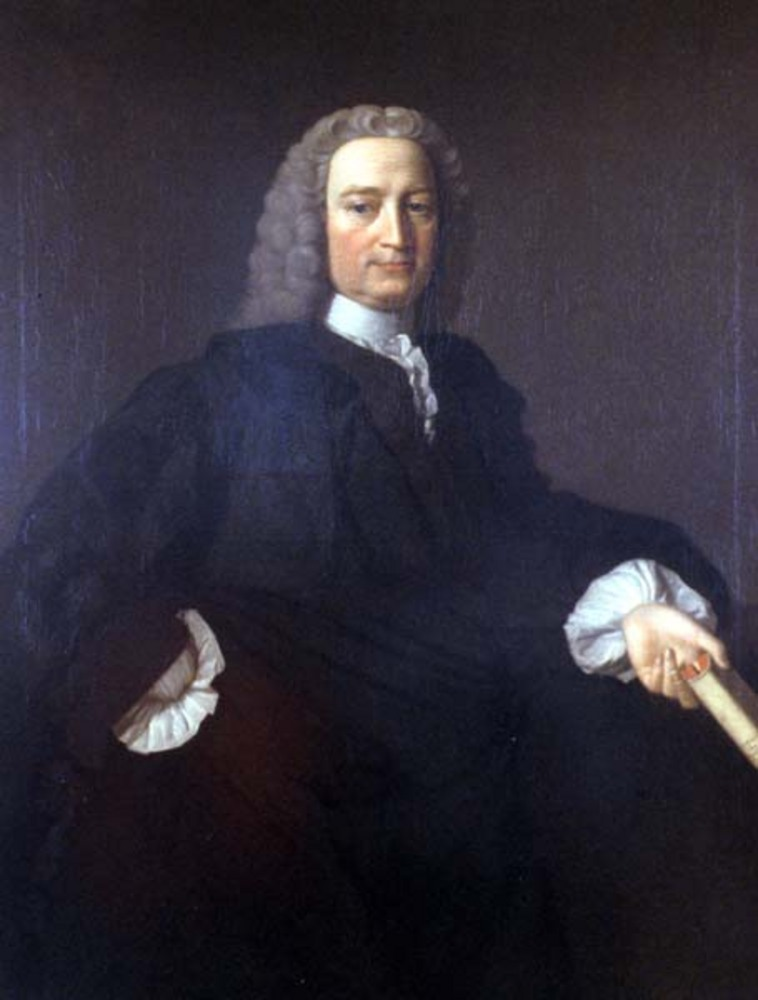
Francis Hutcheson

- 16 July – Marcus Beresford, 1st Earl of Tyrone, politician (d. 1763)
- 8 August – Francis Hutcheson, theologian and philosopher (d. 1746)
- 5 November – Sir Robert Blackwood, 1st Baronet (d. 1774)
- Michael Cuffe, politician (d. 1744)
- Andrew Donlevy, Roman Catholic priest.
- William FitzMaurice, 2nd Earl of Kerry, peer and military officer (d. 1747)
- Warden Flood, Lord Chief Justice of Ireland (d. 1764)
- Robert Parkinson, lawyer and politician (d. 1761)

== Deaths ==
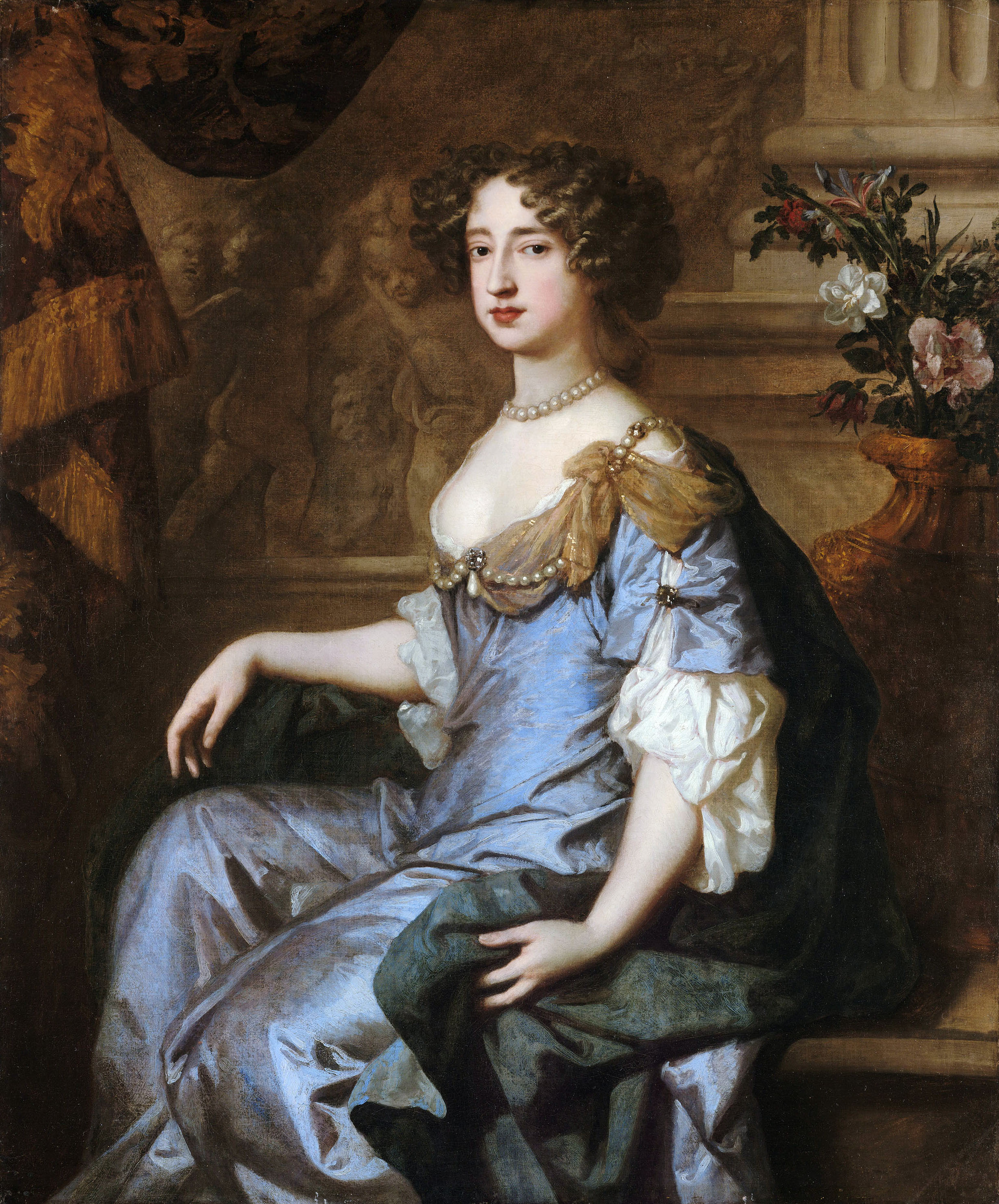
Mary II of England

- July 1 – Justin McCarthy, Viscount Mountcashel, Jacobite general.
- 28 December – Mary II of England, Queen regnant (b. 1662)
- c. December – Patrick Adair, Ulster Scots Presbyterian minister (b. c. 1625)
- Valentine Browne, 1st Viscount Kenmare, peer (b. 1638)
- Probable date – Sir Brian O'Neill, 2nd Baronet, judge and landowner.
