= Francis Burke =

Francis Burke may refer to:

- Francis Burke (Franciscan) (died 1697), Irish Franciscan friar and writer
- Francis Burke (bishop) (died 1723), Irish Roman Catholic archbishop of Tuam
- Francis Burke (Dean of Elphin) (1834–1904), priest of the Church of Ireland
- Francis Michael Burke (1876–1949), Australian politician
- John Francis Burke (1923–2006), Canadian politician
- Joseph Francis Burke (1914–1980), American arranger, composer, band leader and producer
- Maurice Francis Burke (1845–1923), Irish-born prelate

== See also ==
- Frank Burke (disambiguation)
- Frances Burke (disambiguation)
