= 1666 in Ireland =

- Centuries: 15th; 16th; 17th; 18th; 19th
- Decades: 1640s; 1650s; 1660s; 1670s; 1680s
- See also: Other events of 1666; List of years in Ireland

Events from the year 1666 in Ireland.

== Incumbent ==
- Monarch: Charles II

== Events ==
- February – William Penn moves from London to Ireland to manage his father's estates. In May, he is involved in suppressing a mutiny in the English garrison at Carrickfergus.
- The Parliament of Ireland meets for the last time until 1692 (apart from the Patriot Parliament of 1689).
- Lord Maurice Roche of Castletownroche in County Cork loses his entire estate to Lieutenant Colonel John Widenham who receives the Castle as a reward for his loyalty to the Crown. The Castle of the Roches is thus renamed "Castle Widenham".

== Births ==
- Approximate date – Richard Pockrich, landowner, military commander and politician (d.1719)

== Deaths ==
- August – Richard Burke, 6th Earl of Clanricarde, peer.
- December 1 – Sir James Ware, historian, politician and Auditor general for Ireland (b.1594)
- Sir Oliver Óge French, Galway merchant.
- Raymond Caron, O.M.R., Franciscan friar and writer (b.1605)
- Approximate date – Thomas Arthur, physician (b.1593)
