= Peter French (disambiguation) =

Peter French (1849–1897) was a cattle baron from Oregon.

Pete or Peter French may also refer to:

- Peter French (Dominican) (died 1693), Irish theologian
- Peter A. French (born 1942), American philosopher and writer
- Pete French, singer in the bands Leaf Hound, Atomic Rooster and Cactus

== See also ==
- Pete French Round Barn, a round barn in Oregon named after Peter French the cattle baron
- Peter Ffrench (1844–1929), Irish politician
- French Pete Trail, a wilderness trail in Oregon
