= 1743 in Ireland =

- Centuries: 16th; 17th; 18th; 19th; 20th
- Decades: 1720s; 1730s; 1740s; 1750s; 1760s
- See also: Other events of 1743; List of years in Ireland

Events from the year 1743 in Ireland.

== Incumbent ==
- Monarch: George II

== Events ==
- c. April – radical apothecary Charles Lucas publishes his pamphlet A Remonstrance against certain Infringements on the Rights and Liberties of the Commons and Citizens of Dublin, arguing that the right of electing Aldermen for Dublin lies with the entire Corporation.
- 15 June – Arthur Jones-Nevill is appointed Surveyor General of Ireland in succession to Arthur Dobbs.

== Births ==
- 16 April – William Beresford, 1st Baron Decies, Church of Ireland Archbishop of Tuam (died 1819)
- 16 June – Aedanus Burke, soldier, judge, and United States Representative from South Carolina (died 1802)
- 3 October – Henry Prittie, 1st Baron Dunalley, politician (died 1801)
- Joseph Atkinson, dramatist (died 1818)
- Henry Vaughan Brooke, politician (died 1807)
- James Gandon, architect (died 1823)
- Edward Hudson, dentist (died 1821)
- Approximate date – William Creed, politician and merchant in British North America (died 1809)

== Deaths ==
- 11 April – Sir John Osborne, 7th Baronet, politician.
- 3 June – Henry Hamilton, politician (born 1692)
- 16 June – Henry Cairnes, politician (born 1673)
- 20/26 August – Abel Strettel, co-founder of Ballitore village, County Kildare
- James Barry, politician (born 1689)
- Price Hartstonge, politician (born 1692)
