= James Arthur (disambiguation) =

James Arthur (born 1988) is a British singer and winner of The X Factor in 2012.

James Arthur may also refer to:

- James Arthur (album), the singer's self-titled debut album
- James Arthur (theologian) (died 1670), Irish Dominican friar and theologian
- James Arthur (mathematician) (born 1944), Canadian mathematician
- James Arthur (poet) (born 1974), American-Canadian poet
- James Arthur (educational researcher), editor of British Journal of Educational Studies
- James Arthur, founder of House of Fraser
- James Osborne Arthur (1887–1971), missionary for the Reformed Church of America
- James B. Arthur (1831–1905), figure in the early founding of Fort Collins, Colorado and Northern Colorado
- James Arthur McCausland, Canadian politician
- James Arthur (discus thrower) (born 1898), American discus thrower and shot putter, two-time All-American for the Stanford Cardinal track and field team

== See also ==
- Jim Arthur (born 1978), American football coach
- Jamie Arthur (born 1979), Welsh boxer
- James Arthurs (1866–1937), Canadian senator
- Arthur James (disambiguation)
