= 1684 in Ireland =

- Centuries: 15th; 16th; 17th; 18th; 19th
- Decades: 1660s; 1670s; 1680s; 1690s; 1700s
- See also: Other events of 1684; List of years in Ireland

Events from the year 1684 in Ireland.

== Incumbent ==
- Monarch: Charles II

== Events ==
- February 18 – "Court of grace" appointed to enquire into tithes on land.
- March 25 – Royal Hospital Kilmainham is completed in Dublin as a home for retired soldiers, to the design of Sir William Robinson.
- Jeremiah O'Donovan's landownings in County Cork are erected by royal letters patent into the Manor of the Leap.
- The regiment which becomes the Royal Irish Regiment is formed from independent companies by Arthur Forbes, Viscount Granard (who is elevated to Earl of Granard this year).
- Historian Ruaidhrí Ó Flaithbheartaigh (Roderic O'Flaherty) compiles his Chorographical description of West or Iar Connacht for William Molyneux.

== Births ==
- February 20 – Edward Bayly, landowner and politician (d. 1741)

== Deaths ==
- February 25 – Richard Nugent, 2nd Earl of Westmeath, noble and military commander (b. 1621/3)
- July – Sir George Downing, 1st Baronet, Anglo-Irish soldier, statesman, and diplomat (b. 1623)
- Murrough Ó Laoí, physician.
