= 1676 in Ireland =

- Centuries: 15th; 16th; 17th; 18th; 19th
- Decades: 1650s; 1660s; 1670s; 1680s; 1690s
- See also: Other events of 1676; List of years in Ireland

Events from the year 1676 in Ireland.

== Incumbent ==
- Monarch: Charles II

== Events ==
- 31 July – the title Viscount Lanesborough is first created in the Peerage of Ireland in favour of George Lane, 2nd Baronet, of Tulsk.
- 28 August – Irish Donation of 1676 is shipped from Dublin to relieve Boston in the Massachusetts Bay Colony.
- Froinsias Ó Maolmhuaidh's Lucerna fidelium, seu, Fasciclus decerptus ab authoribus magis versatis qui tractarunt de doctrin a Christiana (Lochrann na gCreidmheach), an Irish language catechism of Catholic Church doctrine is published by the Congregation of Propaganda Fide in Rome.

== Births ==
- William Handcock, politician (d. 1723)
- John Rogerson, lawyer and politician (d. 1741)
- Owen Swiny, theatrical impresario and art dealer (d. 1754)
- Caleb Threlkeld, botanist (d. 1728)
- approximate date – John Moore, 1st Baron Moore, politician (d. 1725)

== Deaths ==
- John-Baptist Hackett, Dominican theologian.
- Richard Lynch, Jesuit theologian (b. 1611)
