= Joseph Atkinson =

Joseph Atkinson may refer to:

- Joseph Atkinson (dramatist) (1743–1818), Irish dramatist
- Joseph E. Atkinson (1865–1948), Canadian newspaper editor and activist
