= 1670 in Ireland =

- Centuries: 15th; 16th; 17th; 18th; 19th
- Decades: 1650s; 1660s; 1670s; 1680s; 1690s
- See also: Other events of 1670; List of years in Ireland

Events from the year 1670 in Ireland.

== Incumbent ==
- Monarch: Charles II

== Events ==
- February–April – William Penn visits the Quaker William Morris at Castle Salem, Cork.
- March 7 – Oliver Plunkett, Roman Catholic Archbishop of Armagh and Primate of All Ireland, sets foot on Irish soil for the first time in 23 years.
- June 17 – Peter Talbot, Roman Catholic Archbishop of Dublin and Primate of Ireland, holds his first provincial synod in Dublin. It opens with Solemn High Mass, which for forty years many of the faithful have not witnessed. A subsequent assembly of the senior clergy produces a dispute over the Primacy of Ireland.
- Barrack Bridge is constructed over the River Liffey in Dublin.
- William Robinson is appointed Surveyor General of Ireland.
- First recognized precursor to modern Gaelic football is played in County Meath.

== Arts and literature ==
- December 26 – upper gallery of the Smock Alley Theatre in Dublin collapses for the first time.

== Births ==
- January 24 – William Congreve, English playwright (studies at Kilkenny School and Trinity College Dublin) (d. 1729)
- November 30 – John Toland, philosopher (d. 1722)
- Thomas Burgh, military engineer, architect and politician (d. 1730)
- Sir Pierce Butler, 4th Baronet, politician (d. 1732)
- Arthur Dillon, soldier in the French army (d. 1733)
- Turlough O'Carolan, blind itinerant harpist, "The Last of the Bards" (d. 1738)
- Aogán Ó Rathaille, poet (d. 1728)
- Approximate date – Cornelius Ó Caoimh, Roman Catholic Bishop of Limerick (d. 1737)

== Deaths ==
- William FitzWilliam, 3rd Viscount FitzWilliam, noble (b. c.1610)
- Probable date – James Arthur, Dominican friar and theologian.
