= 1691 in Ireland =

- Centuries: 15th; 16th; 17th; 18th; 19th
- Decades: 1670s; 1680s; 1690s; 1700s; 1710s
- See also: Other events of 1691; List of years in Ireland

== Incumbent ==
- Monarch: William III and Mary II

== Events ==
- 12 July – Williamite War in Ireland: Battle of Aughrim in County Galway: Protestant Williamite forces led by Godert de Ginkell decisively defeat Jacobites under the Marquis de St Ruth (who is killed).
- 22 July – surrender and treaty of Galway.
- August–October – Williamite War in Ireland: Siege of Limerick.
- 3 October – Treaty of Limerick ends the Williamite War. Its terms are immediately broken by the English.
- 22 December – the Flight of the Wild Geese begins, as Patrick Sarsfield, 1st Earl of Lucan leads 19,000 Irish soldiers on ships to France, Spain and onwards to join the armies of Europe.
- Sir William Petty's Political Anatomy of Ireland (written 1672) is first published, posthumously in Dublin.

== Births ==
- Seán Clárach Mac Domhnaill, an Irish language poet, in Churchtown, County Cork.

== Deaths ==
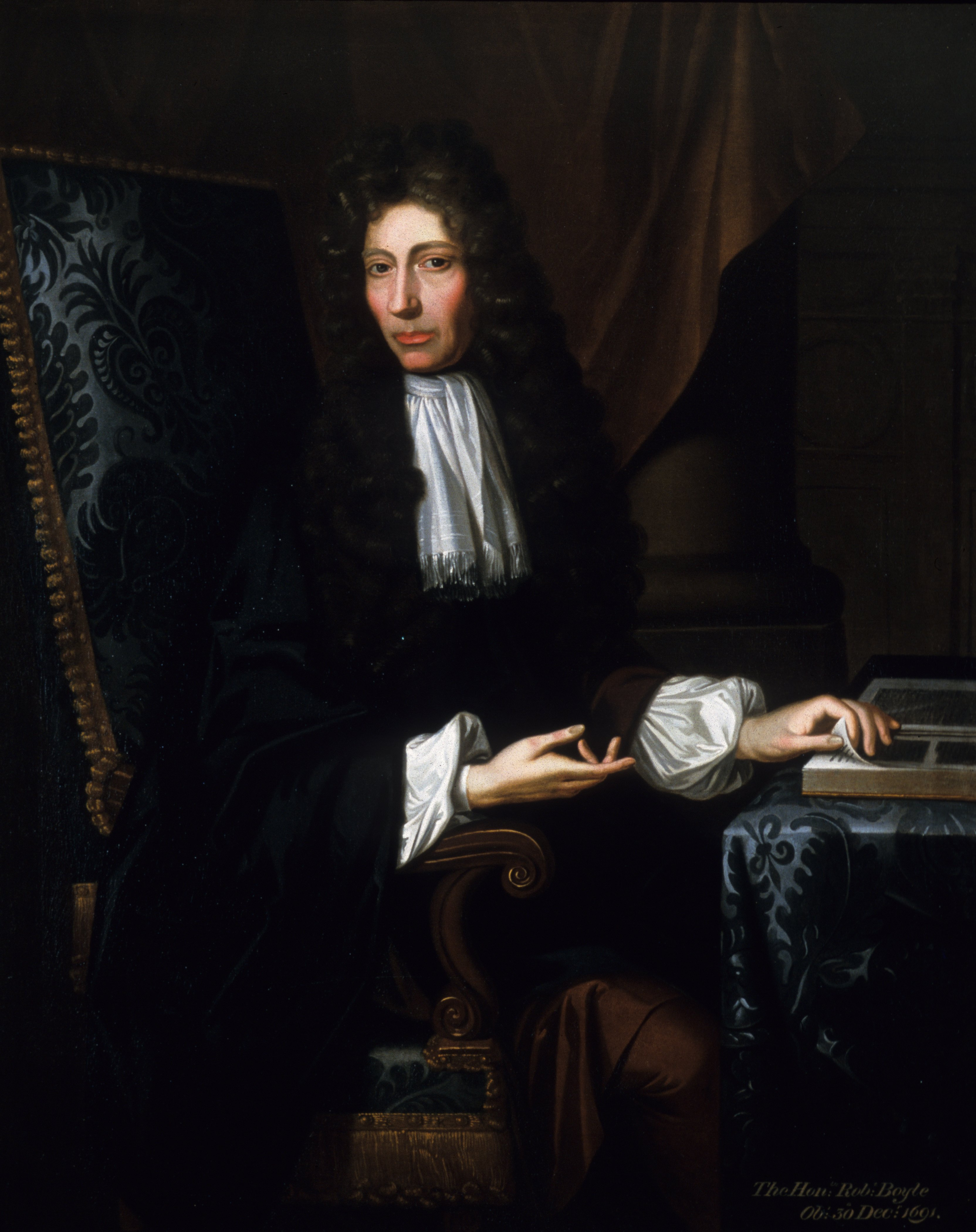
Robert Boyle (Boyle's law)

- August – Claud Hamilton, 4th Earl of Abercorn, Jacobite and soldier, fought at the Battle of the Boyne (b. 1659)
- 18 September – Giles Alington, 4th Baron Alington (b. 1680)
- 30 December – Robert Boyle, natural philosopher (b. 1627)
- Full date unknown
  - James Lally, landowner and politician.
