= 1677 in Ireland =

- Centuries: 15th; 16th; 17th; 18th; 19th
- Decades: 1650s; 1660s; 1670s; 1680s; 1690s
- See also: Other events of 1677; List of years in Ireland

Events from the year 1677 in Ireland.

== Incumbent ==
- Monarch: Charles II

== Events ==
- 24 August – James Butler, 1st Duke of Ormonde, is again sworn in as Lord Lieutenant of Ireland.
- Francis Aungier, 3rd Baron Aungier of Longford, is created 1st Earl of Longford in the Peerage of Ireland.
- Richard Jones, Viscount Ranelagh, is created 1st (and only) Earl of Ranelagh in the Peerage of Ireland.
- Laurence Parsons is created Sir Laurence Parsons, 1st Baronet, of Birr Castle in the King's County, in the Baronetage of Ireland.
- Froinsias Ó Maolmhuaidh's Grammatica Latino-Hibernica nunc compendiata, the first printed grammar of the Irish language (in Latin), is published by the Congregation of Propaganda Fide in Rome.

== Births ==
- Approximate date – Richard FitzWilliam, 5th Viscount FitzWilliam, nobleman and politician (d. 1743)
- 1677 or 1678 – George Farquhar, dramatist (d. 1707)

== Deaths ==
- September – Richard Bellings, lawyer and Confederate politician (b. 1677)
- 14 November – John Temple, judge and politician (b. 1600)
- 21 December – John Parry, Church of Ireland Bishop of Ossory.
- 31 December – Theobald Taaffe, 1st Earl of Carlingford, Royalist soldier and courtier (b. c.1603)
- Francis de Bermingham, Baron Athenry.
- Froinsias Ó Maolmhuaidh, Franciscan friar and linguist (b. c.1605)
- Probable date – John Lynch (Gratianus Lucius), Roman Catholic priest and historian (b. 1599?)
