= 1696 in Ireland =

- Centuries: 15th; 16th; 17th; 18th; 19th
- Decades: 1670s; 1680s; 1690s; 1700s; 1710s
- See also: Other events of 1696; List of years in Ireland

Events from the year 1696 in Ireland.

== Incumbent ==
- Monarch: William III

== Events ==
- April 27 – an act of the Parliament of England for encouraging linen manufacture in Ireland allows plain linen to be exported to England without an import tariff being applied.
- May 2 – The Irish Admiralty’s prize commissioners lodged embezzlement charges related to captured French goods, mainly wines, valued at over £7,279. The suit targeted naval officers such as: Captains Bing, Shovell, and Fitz-Patrick.
- Famine in the Scottish Borders leads to a new wave of Scottish Presbyterian migration from Scotland to Ulster.

== Births ==
- December 1 – Francis Burton, politician (d. 1744)
- Sir Edward Barry, 1st Baronet, physician and politician (d. 1776)
- Thomas Drennan, Presbyterian minister (d. 1768)
- Approximate date – James Latham, portrait painter (d. 1747)
- Abraham Shackleton, Quaker (d. 1771)

== Deaths ==
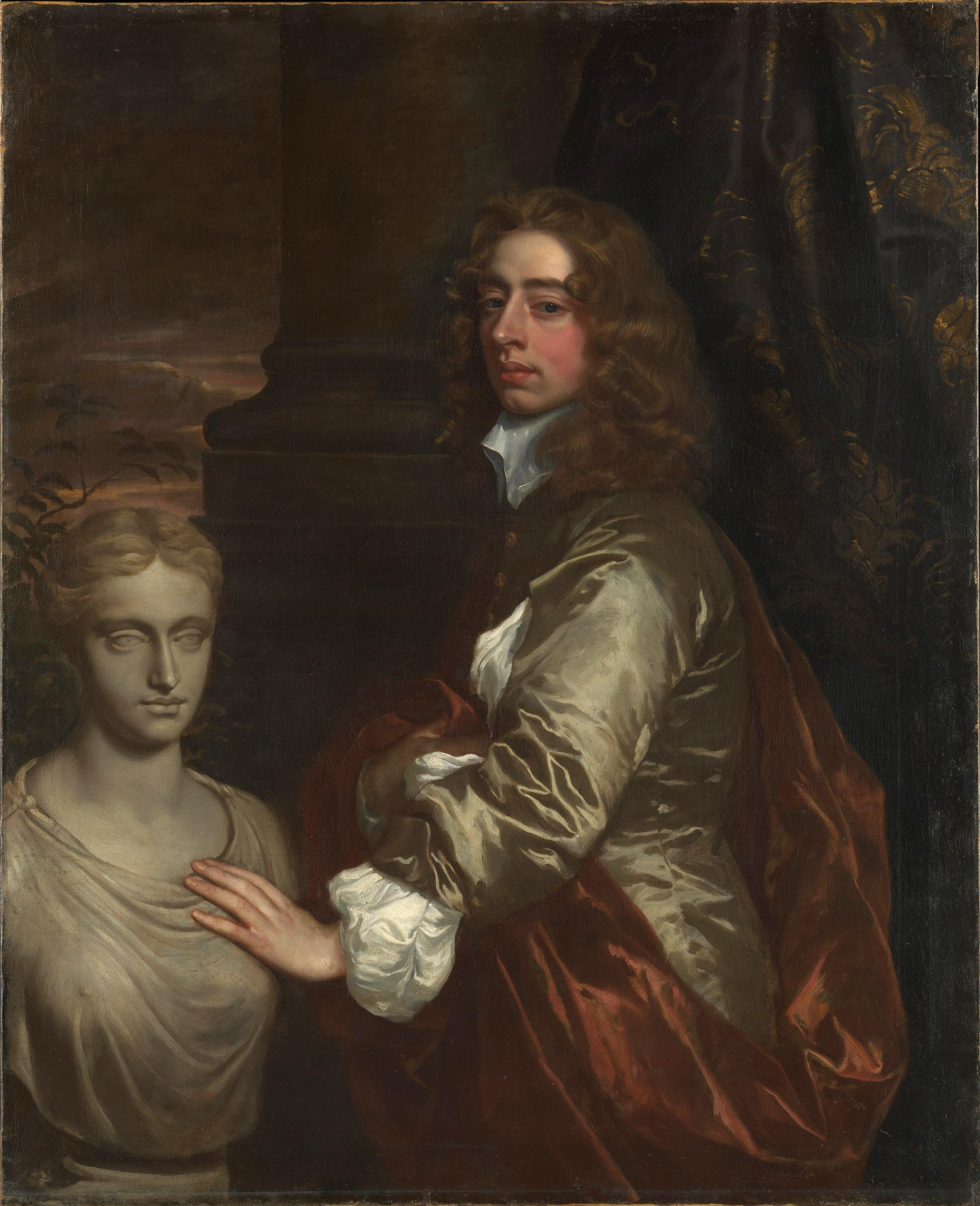
Henry Capel

- March 18 – Bonaventure Baron, Franciscan theologian (b. 1610)
- May 9 – Henry Capell, Lord Deputy of Ireland (b. 1638)
- October? – Sir Oliver St George, 1st Baronet, politician.
- December 8 – Sir Charles Porter, Lord Chancellor of Ireland (b. 1631)
- Daibhidh Ó Duibhgheannáin, scribe and poet (b. before 1651)
