= 1695 in Ireland =

- Centuries: 15th; 16th; 17th; 18th; 19th
- Decades: 1670s; 1680s; 1690s; 1700s; 1710s
- See also: Other events of 1695; List of years in Ireland

Events from the year 1695 in Ireland.

== Incumbent ==
- Monarch: William III

== Events ==
- 4 May – Charles Boyle, Viscount Dungarvan, is appointed Lord High Treasurer of Ireland, in succession to Lord Burlington, his grandfather, Lord Treasurer of Ireland since 1660.
- 9 May – the Whig Henry Capell, Lord Capell, is appointed Lord Deputy of Ireland.
- 10 May – Alan Brodrick is appointed Solicitor-General for Ireland; he is a supporter of Penal Laws against Roman Catholics.
- June – Robert Rochfort is appointed Attorney-General for Ireland.
- 5 June – the title of Viscount Lisburne and Baron Fethard, of Feathered in the County of Tipperary is created in the Peerage of Ireland in favour of Welsh politician John Vaughan.
- 27 August – Parliament of Ireland opens. Robert Rochfort is elected Speaker of the Irish House of Commons.
- 30 September–25 October – an attempt is made in the Irish House of Commons (largely at the instigation of Rochfort) to impeach Charles Porter (Lord Chancellor of Ireland) for his conduct in office. He is acquitted following a speech made in his own defence.
- 1 November – The Parliament of Ireland passes the Sunday Observance Act to promote Sabbatarianism.
- The Parliament of Ireland passes the Education Act, one of the penal laws, prohibiting Roman Catholics from sending their children to be educated in Catholic countries abroad.
- The Parliament of Ireland passes the Settlement of Ireland Act 1695 to annul all legislation passed by the 1689 Patriot Parliament.
- Sir Richard Reynell is dismissed as Lord Chief Justice of the King's Bench in Ireland for incapacity and is succeeded by Sir Richard Pyne.
- Sir Nicholas Acheson is appointed High Sheriff of Armagh.

== Births ==
- Robert Clayton, Church of Ireland Bishop of Clogher (d. 1758)
- Approximate date – John Blunden, politician (d. 1752)

== Deaths ==
- June – Dudley Loftus, jurist and orientalist (b. 1619)
- Charles O'Kelly, soldier, politician and writer (b. 1621)
- Hugh Reily, political writer (b. c.1630)
