= 1688 in Ireland =

- Centuries: 15th; 16th; 17th; 18th; 19th
- Decades: 1660s; 1670s; 1680s; 1690s; 1700s
- See also: Other events of 1688; List of years in Ireland

Events from the year 1688 in Ireland.

== Incumbent ==
- Monarch: James II (until 23 December), deposed

== Events ==
- Dame Mary Joseph Butler establishes a Benedictine house in Dublin.
- November 16 – exiled Irish Catholic widow "Goody" Ann Glover becomes the last person hanged in Boston, Massachusetts, as a witch.
- December 7 – start of the siege of Derry. The city gates are locked against the forces of King James II by apprentice boys.

== Births ==
- Approximate date – Esther Vanhomrigh, Jonathan Swift's "Vanessa" (d. 1723)

== Deaths ==
- March 15 – Peter Valesius Walsh, politician (b. c. 1618)
- July 21 – James Butler, 1st Duke of Ormonde, Anglo-Irish statesman and soldier (b. 1610)
