= 1682 in Ireland =

- Centuries: 15th; 16th; 17th; 18th; 19th
- Decades: 1660s; 1670s; 1680s; 1690s; 1700s
- See also: Other events of 1682; List of years in Ireland

Events from the year 1682 in Ireland.

== Incumbent ==
- Monarch: Charles II

== Events ==
- February 19 – William Sheridan consecrated Bishop of Kilmore and Ardagh in the Church of Ireland.
- February 21 – the Eaton Baronetcy of Dunmoylin, County Limerick is created in the Baronetage of Ireland for Simon Eaton.
- July 24 – the office of Third Serjeant-at-law at the Irish Bar is created, the first holder being John Lyndon.
- September 27 – the King baronetcy of Boyle Abbey in the County of Roscommon is created in the Baronetage of Ireland for Robert King.

== Births ==
- James O'Hara, 2nd Baron Tyrawley, Field Marshal in the British Army (d. 1774)
- Henry Singleton, judge (d. 1759)
- approximate date
  - Henry Boyle, 1st Earl of Shannon, politician (d. 1764)
  - John Ussher, soldier and politician (d. 1741)

== Deaths ==
- March 29 – Roger Boyle, 2nd Earl of Orrery, politician (b. 1646)
- November 28 – Valentine Greatrakes, faith healer (b. 1628)
- Sir George Bingham, 2nd Baronet, politician (b. c.1625)
