= 1675 in Ireland =

- Centuries: 15th; 16th; 17th; 18th; 19th
- Decades: 1650s; 1660s; 1670s; 1680s; 1690s
- See also: Other events of 1675; List of years in Ireland

Events from the year 1675 in Ireland.

== Incumbent ==
- Monarch: Charles II

== Events ==
- September 22 – King Charles II of England orders the setting up of a commission to determine the cases of Connacht transplanters.

== Births ==
- February 7 – Hugh Howard, portrait painter (d. 1737 in London)
- May 4 – Robert FitzGerald, 19th Earl of Kildare (d. 1743)
- George Gore, Attorney-General for Ireland (d. 1753)
- Peter Holmes, politician (d. 1732)
- John Hopkins, poet (d. after 1700).
- Popham Seymour, landowner (k. 1699)
- William Stewart, 2nd Viscount Mountjoy, soldier (d. 1728)
- Approximate date – Charles Jervas, portrait painter (d. 1739)

== Deaths ==
- March 16 – Daniel Witter, Church of Ireland Bishop of Killaloe since 1669.
- March 18 – Arthur Chichester, 1st Earl of Donegall, soldier and politician (b. 1606)
- August 1 – Patrick Duffy, Roman Catholic Bishop of Clogher since 1673.
- Sir Audley Mervyn, lawyer, politician and soldier (b. 1603?)
