= 1697 in Ireland =

- Centuries: 15th; 16th; 17th; 18th; 19th
- Decades: 1670s; 1680s; 1690s; 1700s; 1710s
- See also: Other events of 1697; List of years in Ireland

Events from the year 1697 in Ireland.

== Incumbent ==
- Monarch: William III

== Events ==
- September 25 – Banishment Act, one of the penal laws, banishes all Roman Catholic ordinaries, including bishops, and regular clergy (members of religious institutions) from Ireland.
- October 27 – a thunderstorm ignites the arsenal at Athlone Castle.
- Celbridge Abbey in County Kildare is built as a home by Bartholomew Van Homrigh, Lord Mayor of Dublin.
- Famine in the Scottish Borders leads to continued Scottish Presbyterian migration from Scotland to Ulster.

== Births ==
- September 16 – St George Caulfeild, lawyer and member of the Irish House of Commons (d. 1778)
- December 27 – Sollom Emlyn, legal writer (d. 1754)
- James Duchal, Presbyterian (d. 1761)
- William Ruxton, landowner and member of the Irish House of Commons (d. 1751)
- approx. date – John Ryder, Archbishop of Tuam (Church of Ireland) (d. 1775)

== Deaths ==
- December 20 – Sir Arthur Gore, 1st Baronet, soldier and politician (b. c.1640)
- Francis Burke, Franciscan
- William FitzMaurice, 20th Baron Kerry, peer (b. 1633)
