= Margaret Arthur =

Irish abbess (17th century)

Margaret (Xavieria) Arthur
- Born: Margaret Arthur; 1674; Ireland
- Died: 1743 (aged 68–69); Ypres
- Other name: Xavieria
- Occupation: abbess at Ypres
- Known for: abbess of the Benedictine convent of Irish nuns at Ypres
- Predecessor: Mary Joseph Butler
- Successor: Magdelen Mandeville

Margaret (Xavieria) Arthur (1674 – 1743) was an Irish abbess who led the Benedictine convent of Irish nuns at Ypres from 1723 to 1743. Since 1920 that community has been based at Kylemore Abbey in Ireland.

== Life ==
Arthur was born in Ireland in 1684. She was the daughter of Margaret (born Macnamara) and Francis Arthur who came from families in the counties of Limerick and Clare. She had two sisters Margaret and Clare who would both marry. Her parents became exiles with her father dying in Paris and her mother became a nun in Ghent.

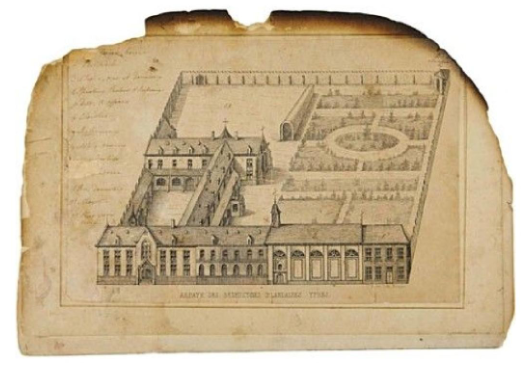
Irish Benedictine Abbey of Our Lady of Grace, at Ypres, Flanders

By 1695 she was in Ypres where she became a novice nun together with three other women. The Irish abbey in Ypres was a very small community led by Mary Joseph Butler who had brought the community back from Ireland. The four new novices and financial support from Queen Mary of Modena, the King of France and Pope Innocent XII made the community secure.

Arthur and Dame Josephs O'Connor took her vows in December 1700. The other two novices were rejected by the abbess as she considered them insincere. Arthur took the new name of Xaviera. In 1703 she became the prioress.

Mary Joseph Butler died on 22 December 1723 and Arthur became the new abbess. She remained a Jacobite and she wrote a letter of support to the Old Pretender.

Arthur died in Ypres in 1743. She was succeeded by Dame M. Magdalen Mandeville. Despite surviving the French revolution, the community left Ypres in 1920 and moved to Ireland to Kylemore Abbey. where they celebrated their centenary at Kylemore in 2020.
