= 1687 in Ireland =

- Centuries: 15th; 16th; 17th; 18th; 19th
- Decades: 1660s; 1670s; 1680s; 1690s; 1700s
- See also: Other events of 1687; List of years in Ireland

Events from the year 1687 in Ireland.

== Incumbent ==
- Monarch: James II

== Events ==
- January 8 – the Roman Catholic Richard Talbot, 1st Earl of Tyrconnell, is appointed Lord Deputy of Ireland.
- Early – the Lord Chancellor of Ireland, Sir Charles Porter, is dismissed on a charge of taking bribes and replaced by Sir Alexander Fitton, a Protestant who converts to Catholicism.
- October – the Roman Catholic Thomas Nugent is appointed Lord Chief Justice of Ireland in succession to William Davys.

== Births ==
- Arthur Blennerhassett, lawyer and politician (d. 1758)
- John Maxwell, 1st Baron Farnham, peer and politician (d. 1759)
- Thomas Sheridan, Anglican divine and writer (d. 1738)
- 1686/1687 – Bridget Kavanah, claimed supercentenarian (d. 1805)

== Deaths ==
- November 26 – Vere Essex Cromwell, 4th Earl of Ardglass, peer (b. 1625)
- Roger Boyle, Church of Ireland Bishop of Clogher (b. 1617?)
- William Burke, 7th Earl of Clanricarde, peer.
- William Davys, Lord Chief Justice of Ireland (fl. 1633)
