= 1690 in Ireland =

- Centuries: 15th; 16th; 17th; 18th; 19th
- Decades: 1670s; 1680s; 1690s; 1700s; 1710s
- See also: Other events of 1690; List of years in Ireland

Events from the year 1690 in Ireland.

== Incumbent ==
- Monarch: William III and Mary II

== Events ==
- 14 June – King William III of England (William of Orange) lands at Carrickfergus in Ulster and marches south to take Dublin.
- 29 June – Williamites reach the River Boyne.
- 1 July (O.S.) – Battle of the Boyne: William III defeats the deposed James II of England, who returns to exile in France from Kinsale.
- 17 July – William III issues the Declaration of Finglas offering a pardon to ordinary Jacobites but not their leaders.
- 7 August – William III and his army reach Limerick.
- August to September – Siege of Limerick, by the Williamites is unsuccessful.
- September – Siege of Cork.
- 7 October – an earthquake with its epicentre at Caernarfon is felt in Dublin.
- Siege of Athlone by the Williamites is unsuccessful.

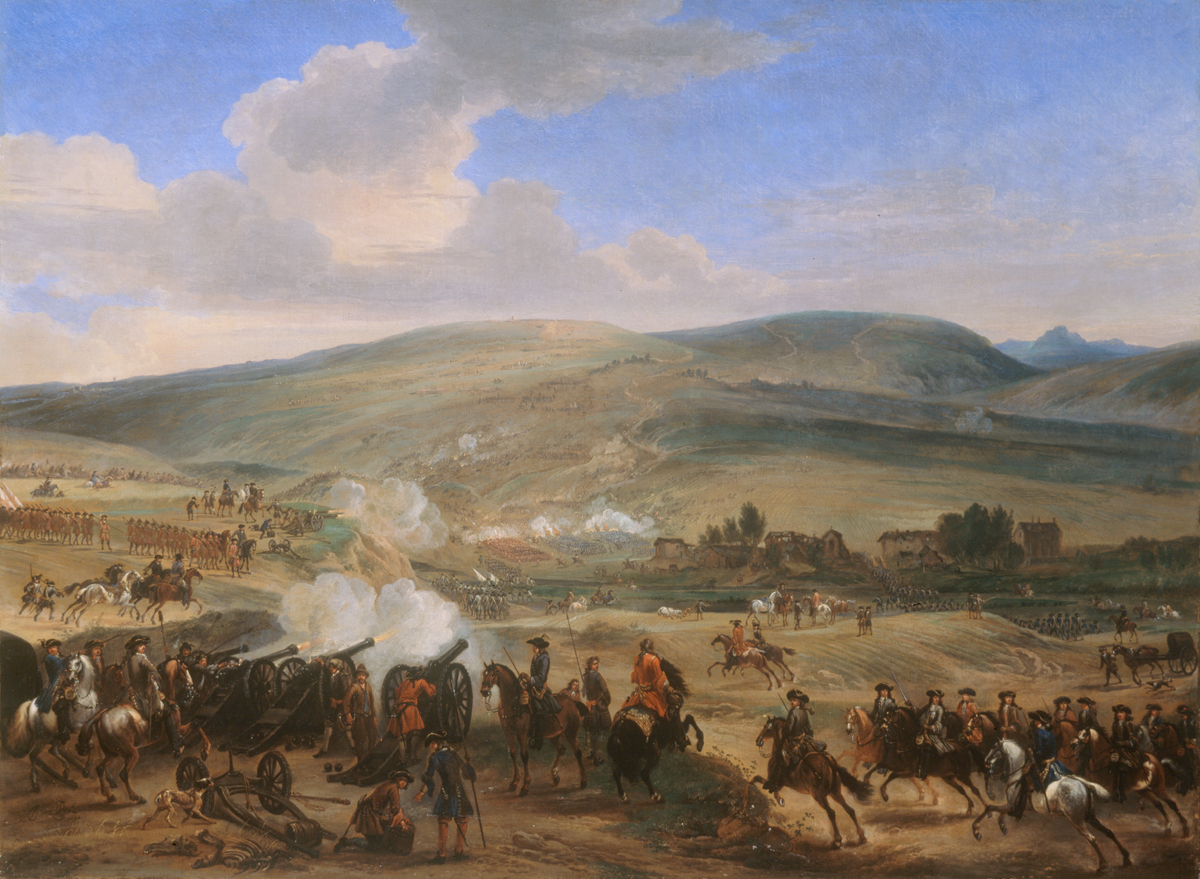
The Battle of the Boyne, painted by Jan Wyck

== Births ==
- 26 September – Charles Macklin, actor and dramatist (d.1797)
- Charles Clinton, French and Indian War Colonel (d.1773)
- William Cosby, British royal governor of New York (d.1736)

== Deaths ==
- 1 July (O.S.) – Battle of the Boyne
  - Frederick Schomberg, 1st Duke of Schomberg, soldier (b. 1615 or 1616)
  - Rev. Sir George Walker, soldier, Governor of Londonderry (b. c. 1618)
