= 1652 in Ireland =

- Centuries: 15th; 16th; 17th; 18th; 19th
- Decades: 1630s; 1640s; 1650s; 1660s; 1670s
- See also: Other events of 1652; List of years in Ireland

Events from the year 1652 in Ireland.

== Events ==
- May 12 – Siege of Galway: Thomas Preston, the military governor of Galway, surrenders the city to English Parliamentarians commanded by Charles Coote. Galway is the last city held by Irish Catholic forces.
- May – the largest Irish guerrilla forces under John Fitzpatrick (in Leinster), Edmund O'Dwyer (in Munster) and Edmund Daly (in Connacht) surrender, under terms signed at Kilkenny, allowing Irish troops to go abroad to serve in foreign armies not at war with the Commonwealth of England.
- August 12 – the Parliament of England passes the Act for the Settlement of Ireland.
- Gerard Boate's Natural History of Ireland is published posthumously.

== Births ==
- December 9 – Robert Rochfort, lawyer and politician (d.1727)
- Robert Blennerhassett, lawyer and politician (d.1712)
- Francis Martin, Augustinian scholar (d.1722)
- Nahum Tate, poet (d.1715)

== Deaths ==
- May 14 – Lieutenant-Colonel "Prime-Iron" James Rochfort, Cromwellian soldier, executed by firing squad following a court martial for killing a fellow officer in a duel.
- Tadhg mac Dáire Mac Bruaideadha, Gaelic historian and poet, killed by soldiers of Oliver Cromwell’s army (b.1570)
- Approximate date – Brian Mac Giolla Phádraig, Gaelic scholar and poet, killed by soldiers of Cromwell's army (b. 1580)
