= 1658 in Ireland =

- Centuries: 15th; 16th; 17th; 18th; 19th
- Decades: 1630s; 1640s; 1650s; 1660s; 1670s
- See also: Other events of 1658; List of years in Ireland

Events from the year 1658 in Ireland.

== Incumbent ==
- Lord Protector: Oliver Cromwell (until 3 September), then Richard Cromwell

== Events ==
- September 3 – Richard Cromwell proclaimed Lord Protector of England, Scotland and Ireland upon the death of his father, Oliver Cromwell.

== Births ==
- Francis Makemie, clergyman, considered to be the founder of Presbyterianism in the US (d.1708)
