= Arthur James =

Arthur James may refer to:

- Arthur James (footballer) (1855–1911), English footballer
- Arthur James (judge) (1916–1976), English Court of Appeal judge
- Arthur James (politician) (1883–1973), Governor of Pennsylvania
- Arthur James (racehorse owner) (1853–1917), British racehorse owner
- Arthur G. James (1912–2001), American surgeon
- Arthur Lorne James (1903–1964), Air Vice-Marshal in the Royal Canadian Air Force
- Arthur Curtiss James (1867–1941), speculator in copper mines and railroads
- Arthur Walter James (1912–2015), British journalist and politician
- Arthur Lloyd James (1884–1943), Welsh phonetician
- Art James (baseball) (born 1952), American MLB outfielder
- Art James (1929–2004), American television personality
- Jimmy Griffin (1943–2005), a.k.a. Arthur James, American songwriter

== See also ==
- James Arthur (disambiguation)
- Arthur James Balfour
