= Frances Burke =

Frances Burke may refer to:

- Frances Burke, Countess of Clanricarde (1567–1633), English noblewoman
- Frances Marie Burke (1922–2017), Miss America 1940
- Frances Mary Burke (1904–1994) was an Australian artist

== See also ==
- Francis Burke (disambiguation)
- France Burke (born c. 1926), American poet and daughter of Kenneth Burke
