= 1665 in Ireland =

- Centuries: 15th; 16th; 17th; 18th; 19th
- Decades: 1640s; 1650s; 1660s; 1670s; 1680s
- See also: Other events of 1665; List of years in Ireland

Events from the year 1665 in Ireland.

== Incumbent ==
- Monarch: Charles II

== Events ==
- The Act of Explanation states that Cromwellian settlers (with some named exceptions) have to give up one third of the lands they received after 1652 in order to compensate innocent Catholic landowners.
- King Charles II of England and Ireland grants letters patent to Sir Robert Reading to erect six lighthouses on the coast of Ireland, at Hook Head, Old Head of Kinsale, Barry Oge's castle, the Isle of Magee (near Carrickfergus) and Howth (two).
- King Charles II elevates the office of Mayor of Dublin to Lord Mayor of Dublin, the first holder being The Right Honourable Sir Daniel Bellingham.
- Michael Boyle (archbishop of Armagh) is appointed Lord Chancellor of Ireland, an office he will hold for more than twenty years.

== Births ==
- 29 April – James Butler, 2nd Duke of Ormonde, soldier and statesman (d.1745)

== Deaths ==
- 3 June – Charles MacCarthy, Irish soldier (killed in battle)
- August – Donagh MacCarthy, Viscount Muskerry, general in the Irish Confederate Wars
