= 1681 in Ireland =

- Centuries: 15th; 16th; 17th; 18th; 19th
- Decades: 1660s; 1670s; 1680s; 1690s; 1700s
- See also: Other events of 1681; List of years in Ireland

Events from the year 1681 in Ireland.

== Incumbent ==
- Monarch: Charles II

== Events ==
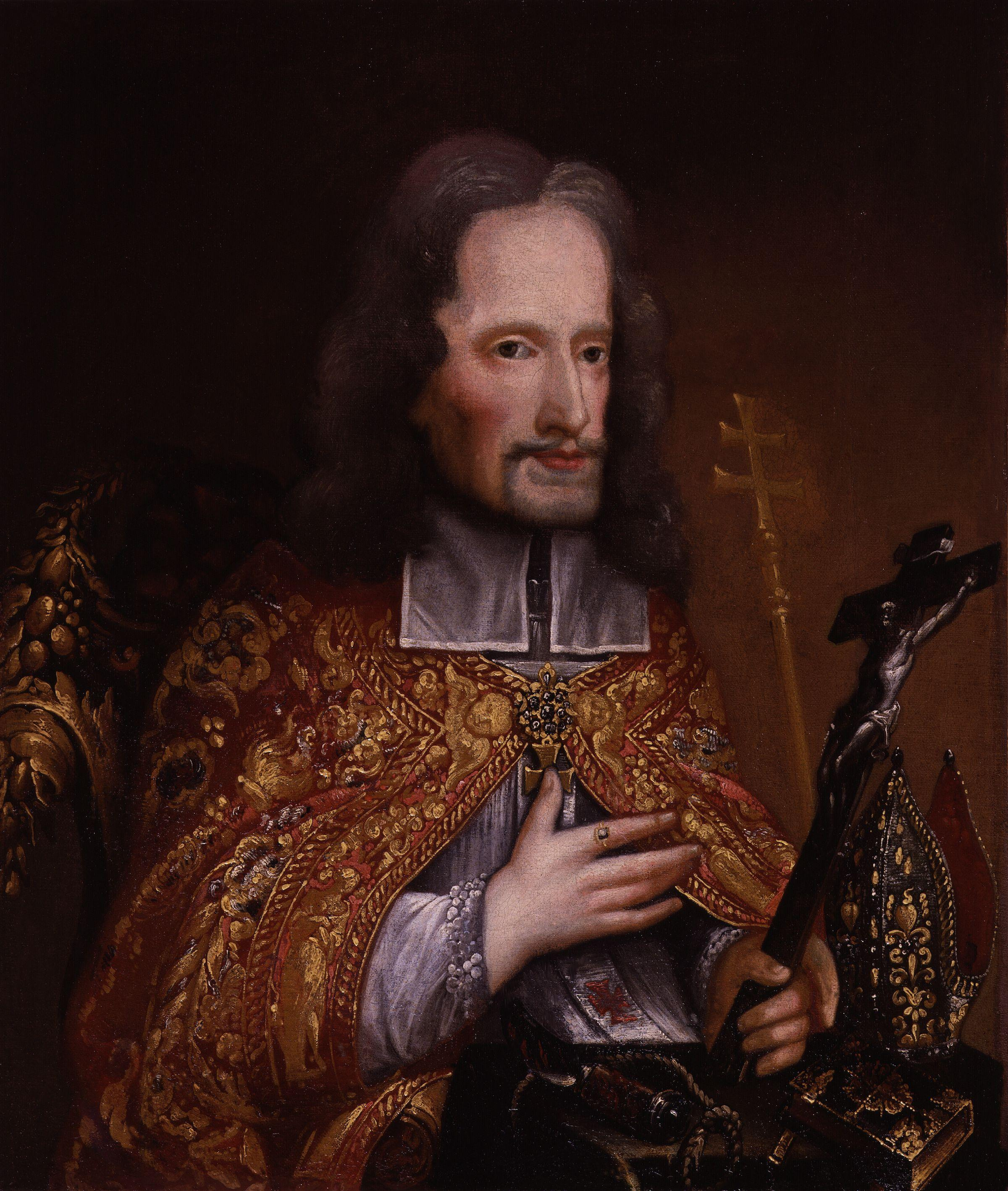
- Oliver Plunket, hanged for treason.
  July 1 – Oliver Plunkett, Roman Catholic Archbishop of Armagh and Primate of All Ireland, falsely convicted in June of treason, is hanged, drawn and quartered at Tyburn, London, the last Catholic martyr to die in England; he will be canonised in 1975. Anglo-Irish Catholic intriguer Edward Fitzharris is executed in London on the same day.
- September 19 – the Quaker William Bates and a small group of emigrants depart from Dublin aboard Ye Owners Adventure to settle in British America.

== Arts and literature ==
- The Dutch portrait painter Ludowyk Smits is active in Dublin.

== Deaths ==
- July 1 – Oliver Plunkett, Roman Catholic Archbishop of Armagh and Primate of All Ireland (b.1629) (hanged)
