= 1656 in Ireland =

- Centuries: 15th; 16th; 17th; 18th; 19th
- Decades: 1630s; 1640s; 1650s; 1660s; 1670s
- See also: Other events of 1656; List of years in Ireland

Events from the year 1656 in Ireland.

== Incumbent ==
- Lord Protector: Oliver Cromwell

== Events ==
- Cromwellian soldier William Morris becomes a Quaker, founding a meeting at Belturbet, County Cavan, before returning to his home at Castle Salem, Cork.
- William Petty completes the comprehensive mapping of Ireland known as the Down Survey.

== Births ==
- 17 April – William Molyneux, natural philosopher and writer, founder of the Dublin Philosophical Society (d.1698).

== Deaths ==
- 21 March – James Ussher, Archbishop of Armagh (Church of Ireland) and Primate of All Ireland, published the Ussher chronology purporting to time and date creation (b. 1581)
- Approximate date – Sir Dominick Browne, merchant and landowner (b. c.1585)
