= 1686 in Ireland =

- Centuries: 15th; 16th; 17th; 18th; 19th
- Decades: 1660s; 1670s; 1680s; 1690s; 1700s
- See also: Other events of 1686; List of years in Ireland

Events from the year 1686 in Ireland.

== Incumbent ==
- Monarch: James II

== Events ==
- January 9 – Henry Hyde, 2nd Earl of Clarendon, sworn as Lord Lieutenant of Ireland in Dublin.
- March 22 – warrant issued by King James II of England for payments to Roman Catholic bishops.
- April 6 – Michael Boyle (archbishop of Armagh) is replaced as Lord Chancellor of Ireland (after serving for twenty years) by Sir Charles Porter.
- April 20–April 24 – three Roman Catholic judges are appointed to Ireland (but Charles Ingleby refuses to travel there).
- June 5–October 26 – the Roman Catholic Richard Talbot, 1st Earl of Tyrconnell, serves in Ireland as commander in chief of the army.
- October 26 – the Roman Catholic lawyer and politician Richard Nagle writes the 'Coventry letter' to Tyrconnell attacking land settlement in Ireland.
- December – Sir Richard Nagle is appointed Attorney-General for Ireland.

== Arts and literature ==
- February – first known music printed in Ireland.
- Jonathan Swift is granted his BA from Trinity College Dublin ex speciali gratia.

== Births ==
- March 22 – James Hamilton, 7th Earl of Abercorn (d.1744)
- December 23 – Samuel Madden, clergyman and writer (d.1765)
- Chaworth Brabazon, 6th Earl of Meath (d.1763)

== Deaths ==
- April 6 – Arthur Annesley, 1st Earl of Anglesey, royal statesman (b.1614)
