= 1664 in Ireland =

- Centuries: 15th; 16th; 17th; 18th; 19th
- Decades: 1640s; 1650s; 1660s; 1670s; 1680s
- See also: Other events of 1664; List of years in Ireland

Events from the year 1664 in Ireland.

== Incumbent ==
- Monarch: Charles II

== Events ==
- St Stephen's Green, Dublin, enclosed for building.
- St. Bride's Church is completed following the uniting of the parishes of St Stephen, St Michael Le Pole and St Bride.
- Portmore Castle is erected near the shores of Portmore Lough in County Antrim.

== Publications ==
- Roger Boyle, 1st Earl of Orrery's plays The General and Henry V.
- Sir James Ware's history Rerum Hibernicarum Annales ab Anno Domini 1485 ad Annum 1558.

== Births ==
- Almeric de Courcy, 23rd Baron Kingsale, peer (d. 1720)

== Deaths ==
- 5 March – Wentworth FitzGerald, 17th Earl of Kildare, politician (b. 1634)
