= 1663 in Ireland =

- Centuries: 15th; 16th; 17th; 18th; 19th
- Decades: 1640s; 1650s; 1660s; 1670s; 1680s
- See also: Other events of 1663; List of years in Ireland

Events from the year 1663 in Ireland.

== Incumbent ==
- Monarch: Charles II

== Events ==
- January 1 – the Franciscan chapel in Cook Street, Dublin, is raided by the military.
- May 21 – Colonel Thomas Blood fails in an attempt to seize Dublin Castle in support of the claims of Cromwellian soldiers.
- July 27 – the Parliament of England passes the second Navigation Act, restricting Irish trade with colonies and the cattle trade with England.
- August 20 – James Margetson is translated from Archbishop of Dublin to Archbishop of Armagh (Church of Ireland) and Primate of All Ireland.
- The Cooper family are granted Markree Castle.

== Arts and literature ==
- Katherine Philips' translation of Pierre Corneille's Pompée is successfully produced at the Theatre Royal, Dublin (Smock Alley Theatre), the first English language play written by a woman to be performed on the professional stage. It is published in Dublin and London later in the year.

== Births ==
- Francis Bernard, lawyer and politician (d. 1731)
- approximate date – Frederick Hamilton, politician (d. 1715)

== Deaths ==
- August 20 – Nicholas Barnewall, 1st Viscount Barnewall, politician (b. 1592)
- September 15 – Hugh Montgomery, 1st Earl of Mount Alexander, soldier (b. c.1623)
