= 1657 in Ireland =

- Centuries: 15th; 16th; 17th; 18th; 19th
- Decades: 1630s; 1640s; 1650s; 1660s; 1670s
- See also: Other events of 1657; List of years in Ireland

Events from the year 1657 in Ireland.

== Incumbent ==
- Lord Protector: Oliver Cromwell

== Events ==
- 8 June – the Parliament of England passes the Act of Settlement for the Assuring, Confirming and Settling of lands and estates in Ireland, confirming legal arrangements made under the Act for the Settlement of Ireland 1652.
- 17 November – Henry Cromwell, son of Oliver Cromwell, appointed Lord Lieutenant of Ireland.
- Town of Skibbereen chartered.

== Deaths ==
- July – Ulick Burke, 1st Marquess of Clanricarde, nobleman and figure in English Civil War (b. 1604)
- Luke Wadding, Franciscan friar and historian (b. 1588)
