= Frank Burke =

Frank Burke may refer to:

- Frank Burke (United States Army officer) (1918–1988), American army officer and Medal of Honor recipient
- Frank G. Burke (1927–2015), acting archivist of the United States
- Frank W. Burke (1920–2007), American politician
- Frank Burke (Australian politician) (1876–1949), speaker of the New South Wales Legislative Assembly
- Frank Burke (baseball) (1880–1946), American baseball player
- Frank Burke (hurler) (born 1952), Irish hurler
- Frank Burke (dual player) (1895–1987), Irish hurler and Gaelic footballer
- Frankie Burke (1915–1983), American actor

== See also ==
- Francis Burke (disambiguation)
