= 1679 in Ireland =

- Centuries: 15th; 16th; 17th; 18th; 19th
- Decades: 1650s; 1660s; 1670s; 1680s; 1690s
- See also: Other events of 1679; List of years in Ireland

Events from the year 1679 in Ireland.

== Incumbent ==
- Monarch: Charles II

== Events ==
- Lismore Cathedral (Church of Ireland) abandoned until 1749.

== Births ==
- 11 September – Thomas Parnell, clergyman and poet (d.1718)
- Anthony Duane, businessman in America (d.1747)

== Deaths ==
- Sir George Hamilton, 1st Baronet of Donalong, soldier.
