= 1683 in Ireland =

- Centuries: 15th; 16th; 17th; 18th; 19th
- Decades: 1660s; 1670s; 1680s; 1690s; 1700s
- See also: Other events of 1683; List of years in Ireland

Events from the year 1683 in Ireland.

== Incumbent ==
- Monarch: Charles II

== Events ==
- February 19 – the Evans Baronetcy, of Kilcreene in the County of Kilkenny, is created in the Baronetage of Ireland in favour of William Evans.
- June 23 – the Caldwell Baronetcy of Wellsborough in County Fermanagh, is created in the Baronetage of Ireland in favour of James Caldwell, High Sheriff of County Fermanagh.
- September 17 – The newly constructed St Mary's Church, Blessington, County Wicklow is dedicated
- October 15 – first meeting of the Dublin Philosophical Society, established by William Molyneux.
- December 14 – Dominic Maguire, O.P., is elected as Roman Catholic Archbishop of Armagh and Primate of All Ireland by the Sacred Congregation for the Propagation of the Faith.
- The titles of Viscount Mountjoy and Baron Stewart of Ramelton in the Peerage of Ireland are conferred upon Sir William Stewart, 3rd Baronet, of Ramelton.

== Births ==
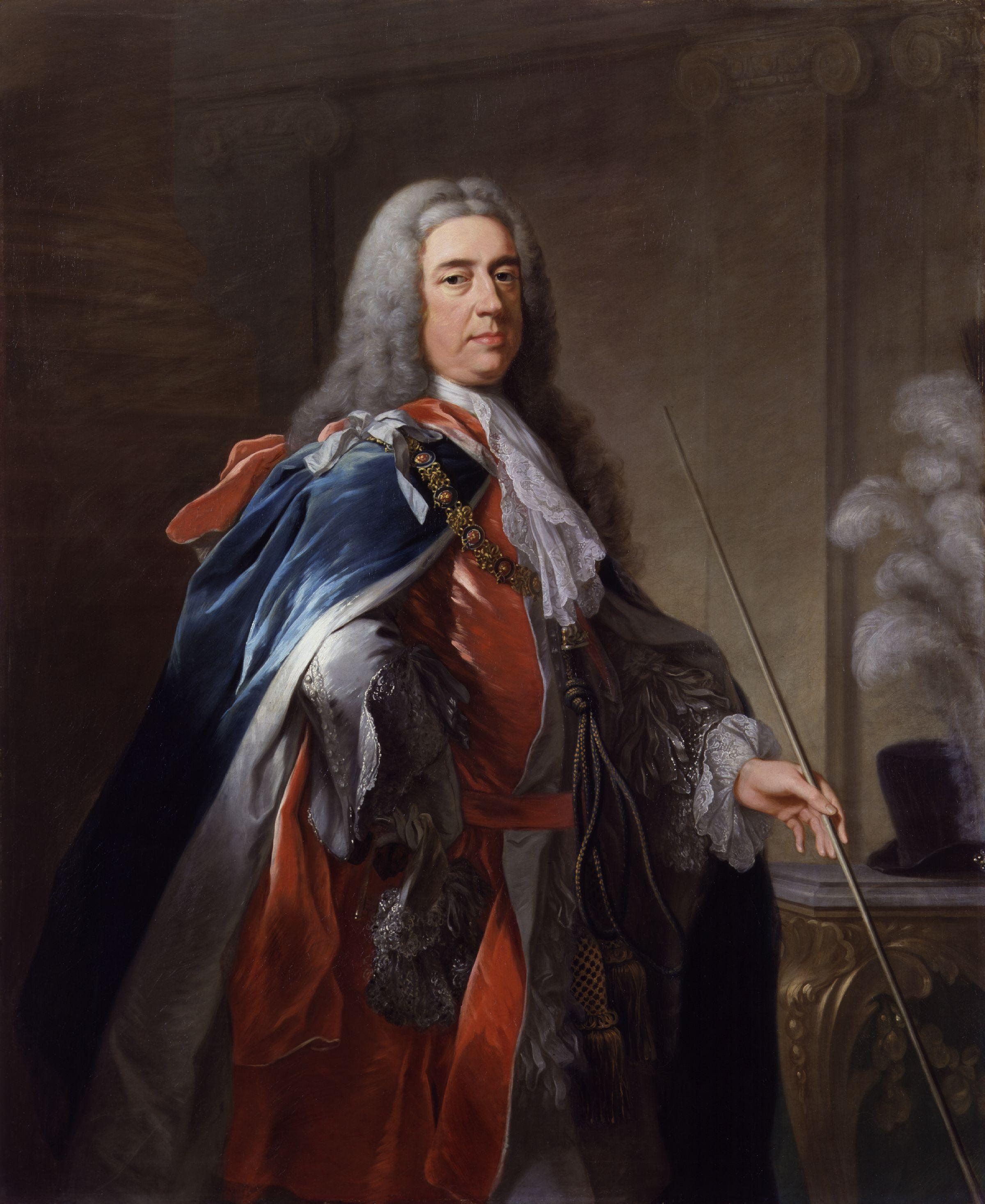
Charles Fitzroy

- October 25 – Charles FitzRoy, 2nd Duke of Grafton, Lord Lieutenant of Ireland (d. 1757)
- Daniel Falkiner, politician (d. 1759)
- Thomas Fortescue, politician (d. 1769)
- Michael Ward, politician (d. 1759)

== Deaths ==
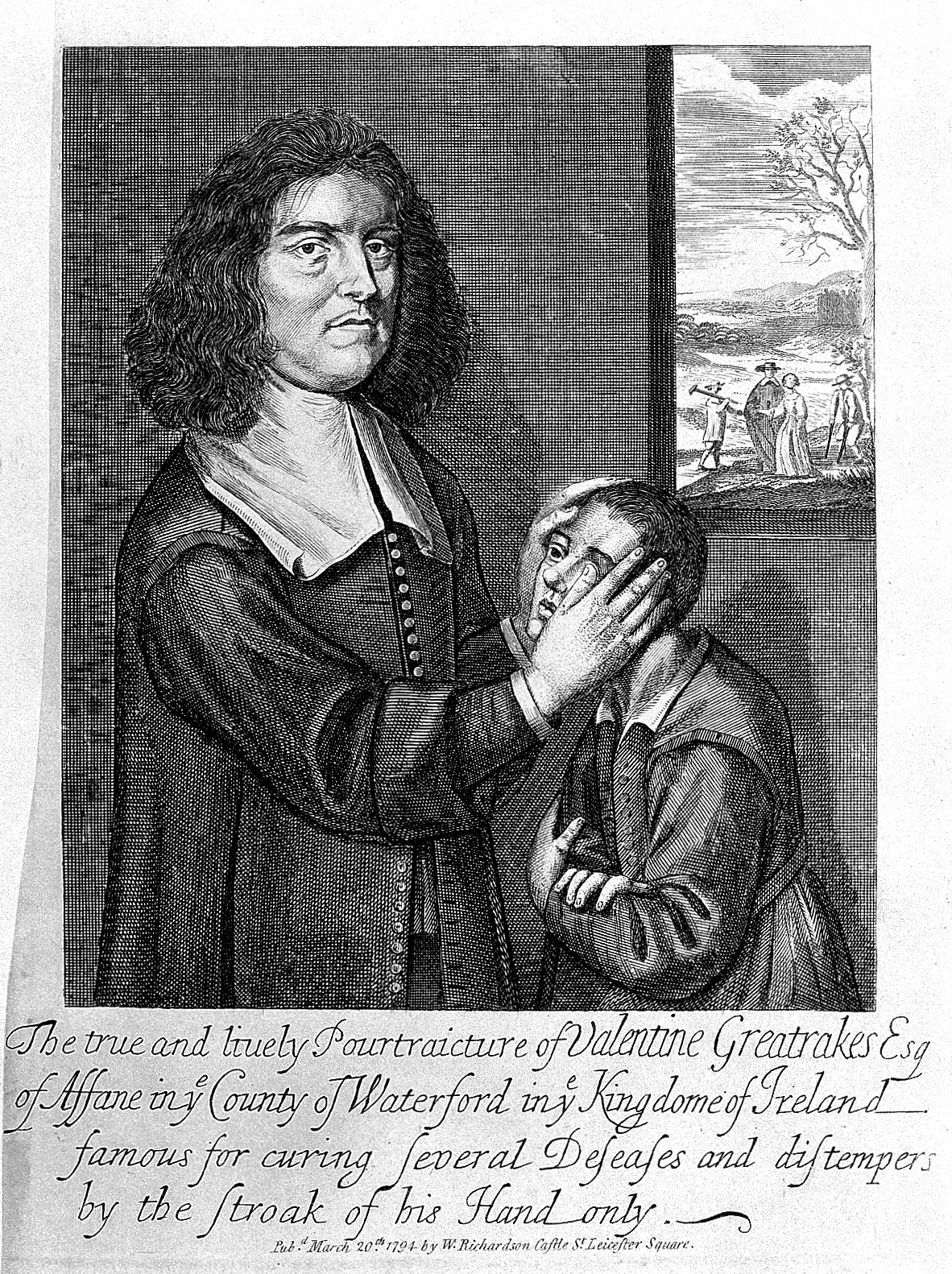
- Valentine Greatrakes
  February 3 – Randal MacDonnell, 1st Marquess of Antrim, Roman Catholic landowner in Ireland and Scotland and political intriguer (b. 1609)
- November 28 – Valentine Greatrakes, faith healer (b. 1628)
- December 11 – George Lane, 1st Viscount Lanesborough, politician (b. c.1620)
- Charles Kirkhoven, 1st Earl of Bellomont, Dutch-born peer (b. 1643)
