= 1698 in Ireland =

- Centuries: 15th; 16th; 17th; 18th; 19th
- Decades: 1670s; 1680s; 1690s; 1700s; 1710s
- See also: Other events of 1698; List of years in Ireland

Events from the year 1698 in Ireland.

== Incumbent ==
- Monarch: William III

== Events ==
- Early – William Molyneux publishes The Case of Ireland's being Bound by Acts of Parliament in England, Stated.
- Famine in the Scottish Borders leads to continued Scottish Presbyterian migration from Scotland to Ulster.
- The Lord Mayor of Dublin's gold chain of office is presented by King William III to Dublin Corporation.
- John Dunton publishes Teague Land: or A Merry Ramble to the Wild Irish.
- John Hopkins publishes the poem The Triumphs of Peace, or the Glories of Nassau ... written at the time of his Grace the Duke of Ormond's entrance into Dublin.

== Births ==
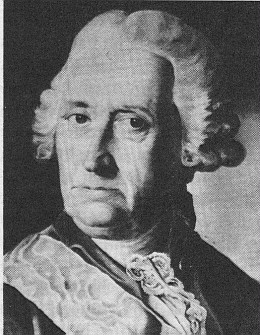
George Browne

- June 15 – George Browne, soldier of fortune, general in the Russian army (d. 1792)
- Ross Roe MacMahon, Roman Catholic Bishop of Clogher, later Archbishop of Armagh (d. 1748)

== Deaths ==
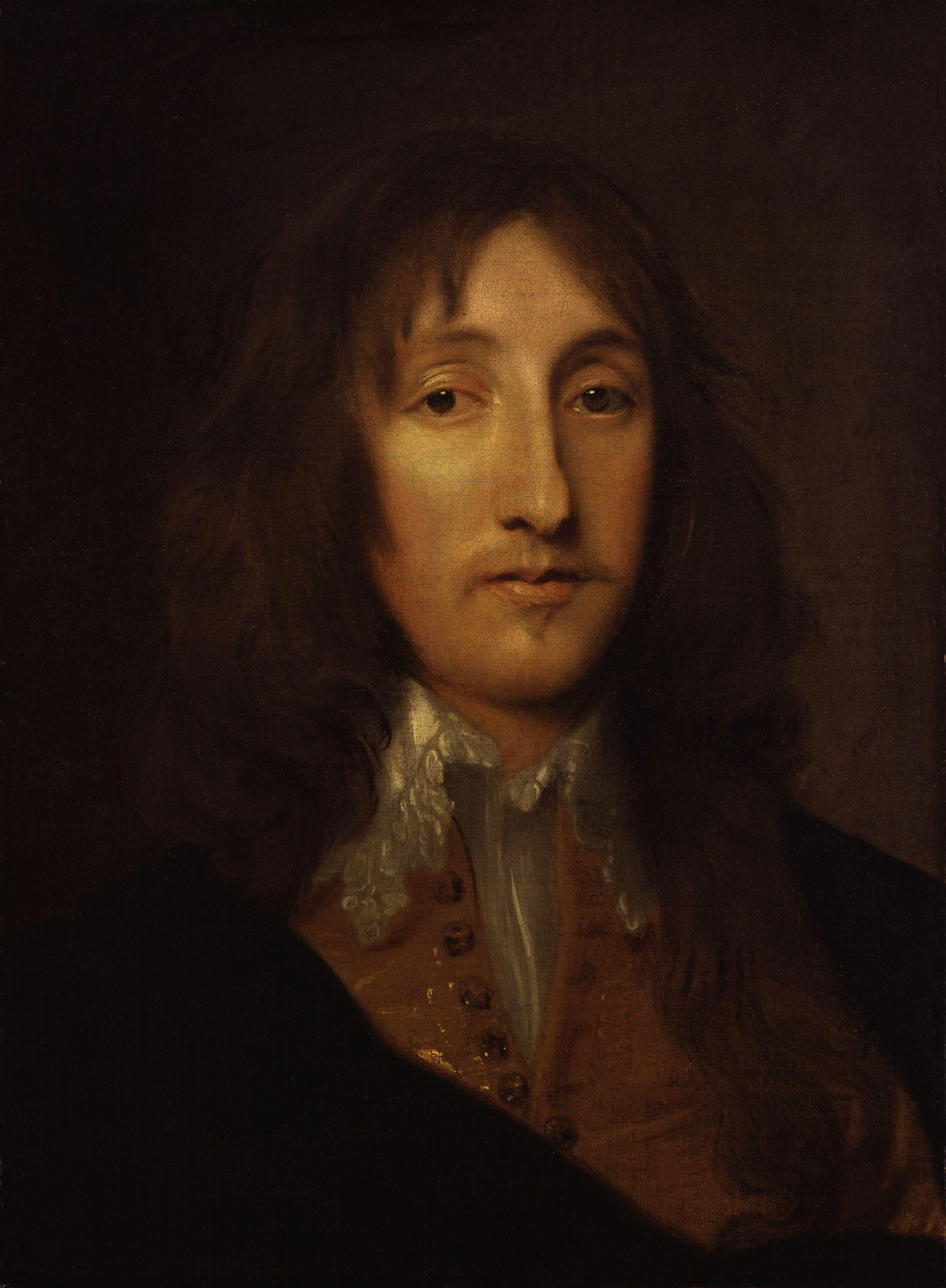
Richard Boyle

- January 15 – Richard Boyle, 1st Earl of Burlington, cavalier and Lord High Treasurer of Ireland (b. 1612)
- January – Dáibhí Ó Bruadair, poet (b. 1625)
- October 11 – William Molyneux, natural philosopher and writer, founded the Dublin Philosophical Society (b. 1656)
