= 1655 in Ireland =

- Centuries: 15th; 16th; 17th; 18th; 19th
- Decades: 1630s; 1640s; 1650s; 1660s; 1670s
- See also: Other events of 1655; List of years in Ireland

Events from the year 1655 in Ireland.

== Incumbent ==
- Lord Protector: Oliver Cromwell

== Events ==
- July – Henry Cromwell, son of Oliver, is appointed as major-general of the forces in Ireland and a member of the Irish council of state. After the Lord Deputy, Charles Fleetwood, departs for England in September, Henry Cromwell de facto takes over that role also.

== Births ==
- Approximate date
  - Sir Nicholas Acheson, 4th Baronet, politician (d.1701)
  - Henry Luttrell, soldier (d.1717) (killed)
  - Daniel Roseingrave, organist (d.1727)

== Deaths ==
- February 16 – Rory (Roger) O'Moore, principal organizer of the Irish Rebellion of 1641 (b. c.1620)
- June 16 – James Hamilton, 3rd Baron Hamilton of Strabane, peer (b.1633)
