= 1661 in Ireland =

- Centuries: 15th; 16th; 17th; 18th; 19th
- Decades: 1640s; 1650s; 1660s; 1670s; 1680s
- See also: Other events of 1661; List of years in Ireland

Events from the year 1661 in Ireland.

== Incumbent ==
- Monarch: Charles II

== Events ==
- April 23 – Charles II of England, Ireland and Scotland receives his second crowning, in Westminster Abbey.
- The Earldom of Drogheda is created in the Peerage of Ireland.
- The Bishopric of Limerick in the Church of Ireland is combined with Ardfert and Aghadoe to form the united bishopric of Limerick, Ardfert and Aghadoe, Edward Synge being the first bishop.
- The Book of Kells is presented to Trinity College Dublin.
- Dromore Cathedral is rebuilt.
- The witch trial against Florence Newton.
