= 1678 in Ireland =

- Centuries: 15th; 16th; 17th; 18th; 19th
- Decades: 1650s; 1660s; 1670s; 1680s; 1690s
- See also: Other events of 1678; List of years in Ireland

Events from the year 1678 in Ireland.

== Incumbent ==
- Monarch: Charles II

== Events ==
- 11 October – Peter Talbot, Roman Catholic Archbishop of Dublin and Primate of Ireland, having returned to Ireland in May, is arrested near Maynooth on the orders of James Butler, Duke of Ormonde, Lord Lieutenant of Ireland, for supposed complicity in the "Popish Plot" and imprisoned in Dublin Castle.
- The vacant Bishopric of Leighlin is given to the Bishop of Kildare to form the Roman Catholic Diocese of Kildare and Leighlin.

== Births ==
- 26 September – Peter Lacy, soldier, imperial commander in Russia (d.1751)
- 1677 or 1678 – George Farquhar, dramatist (d.1707)

== Deaths ==
- 23 August – Nicholas French, Bishop of Ferns, political activist and pamphleteer (b.1604)
