= 1668 in Ireland =

- Centuries: 15th; 16th; 17th; 18th; 19th
- Decades: 1640s; 1650s; 1660s; 1670s; 1680s
- See also: Other events of 1668; List of years in Ireland

Events from the year 1668 in Ireland.

== Incumbent ==
- Monarch: Charles II

== Events ==
- Roger Boyle, Earl of Orrery, resigns the office of Lord President of Munster on account of disputes with James Butler, Duke of Ormonde, Lord Lieutenant of Ireland.

== Births ==
- Thomas FitzMaurice, 1st Earl of Kerry, politician (d. 1741)

== Deaths ==
- 14 April – George Hamilton, 4th Baron Hamilton of Strabane (b. c.1636/7)
- Full date unknown – Patrick D'Arcy, nationalist who wrote the constitution of Confederate Ireland (b. 1598)
