= 1653 in Ireland =

- Centuries: 15th; 16th; 17th; 18th; 19th
- Decades: 1630s; 1640s; 1650s; 1660s; 1670s
- See also: Other events of 1653; List of years in Ireland

Events from the year 1653 in Ireland.

== Incumbent ==
- Lord Protector: Oliver Cromwell (from 16 December)

== Events ==
- January 6 – a law declares any Roman Catholic priest in Ireland to be guilty of treason.
- April 27 – the last Irish forces (the remnants of the Confederate's Ulster Army, led by Philip O'Reilly) formally surrender at Cloughoughter in County Cavan to the Cromwellian army ending the Confederate Wars
- September 26 – an act provides for transplanting all native Irish people into Connacht.
- December 16 – Cromwell proclaimed Lord Protector of England, Scotland and Ireland.

== Births ==
- William Stewart, 1st Viscount Mountjoy, soldier (k. 1692)

== Deaths ==
- August
  - Phelim O'Neill, hanged in Dublin by the English Parliamentarians for his role in the Irish Rebellion of 1641
  - Piaras Feiritéar, poet, hanged in Killarney by the English Parliamentarians for his role in the Rebellion of 1641.
- Niall Ó Glacáin, physician (b. c.1563)
- Hugh O'Reilly, Roman Catholic Archbishop of Armagh (b. c.1581)
