= 1659 in Ireland =

- Centuries: 15th; 16th; 17th; 18th; 19th
- Decades: 1630s; 1640s; 1650s; 1660s; 1670s
- See also: Other events of 1659; List of years in Ireland

Events from the year 1659 in Ireland.

== Incumbent ==
- Lord Protector: Richard Cromwell (until 25 May)

== Events ==
- 25 May – Richard Cromwell (son of Oliver) resigns as Lord Protector of England, Scotland and Ireland.
- 15 June – Henry Cromwell (son of Oliver) resigns as Lord Lieutenant of Ireland.

== Births ==
- September – Claud Hamilton, 4th Earl of Abercorn, Jacobite and soldier, fought at the Battle of the Boyne (d.1691)
- 28 October – Nicholas Brady, Anglican divine and poet (d.1726)
