= Midwest Studies in Philosophy =

Midwest Studies In Philosophy
- Discipline: Philosophy
- Language: English
- Edited by: Yuval Avnur, Peter A. French, Howard K. Wettstein

Publication details
- History: 1976–present
- Publisher: Philosophy Documentation Center (United States)
- Frequency: Annual

Standard abbreviations
- ISO 4: Midwest Stud. Philos.

Indexing
- ISSN: 0363-6550 (print); 1475-4975 (web)
- LCCN: sf77000004
- OCLC no.: 2489329

Links
- Journal homepage; List of published volumes

Midwest Studies in Philosophy is an annual journal in the analytic tradition. It was established in 1976 by Peter French, Theodore Uehling, Jr., and Howard Wettstein at the University of Minnesota, and has been published without interruption since that time. Each volume is an anthology of invited contributions on a particular topic. The journal was published by Wiley from 1999 to 2019 with a SHERPA/RoMEO "yellow" self-archiving policy. The journal is edited by Yuval Avnur, Peter French, and Howard Wettstein and published by the Philosophy Documentation Center.

== Indexing ==
Midwest Studies in Philosophy is abstracted and indexed in the following bibliographic databases:

- Academic Onefile
- Academic Search
- Arts and Humanities Citation Index
- ERIH PLUS
- Index Theologicus
- International Philosophical Bibliography
- The Philosopher's Index
- PhilPapers
- Scopus

== See also ==
- List of philosophy journals
