= 1667 in Ireland =

- Centuries: 15th; 16th; 17th; 18th; 19th
- Decades: 1640s; 1650s; 1660s; 1670s; 1680s
- See also: Other events of 1667; List of years in Ireland

Events from the year 1667 in Ireland.

== Incumbent ==
- Monarch: Charles II

== Events ==
- William Penn attends meetings of the Quakers in Cork, marking his conversion.

== Births ==
- November 30 – Jonathan Swift, cleric, satirist, essayist and poet (d.1745)
- Christian Davies, soldier (d.1739)

== Deaths ==
- June 23 – Lady Alice Boyle, later Alice Barry, Countess of Barrymore (b.1607)
