= 1669 in Ireland =

- Centuries: 15th; 16th; 17th; 18th; 19th
- Decades: 1640s; 1650s; 1660s; 1670s; 1680s
- See also: Other events of 1669; List of years in Ireland

Events from the year 1669 in Ireland.

== Incumbent ==
- Monarch: Charles II

== Events ==
- January 11 – Peter Talbot is appointed Roman Catholic Archbishop of Dublin and Primate of Ireland (consecrated at Antwerp 29 April (9 May New Style)).
- March 8 – James Lynch is appointed Roman Catholic Archbishop of Tuam (consecrated at Ghent 6 May (16 May NS)).
- March 26 – a royal charter is granted to the trust established by Erasmus Smith for the provision of grammar schools in Ireland, under which
  - Drogheda Grammar School is founded.
  - The King's Hospital is endowed as The Hospital and Free School of King Charles II in Dublin.
- May–August – George Fox, founder of the Quakers, visits Ireland. William Penn also returns to Ireland this year.
- July 9 – Oliver Plunkett is appointed Roman Catholic Archbishop of Armagh and Primate of All Ireland (consecrated at Ghent 21 November (1 December NS)).
- One of a pair of gold sun-discs from ca. 2500–2150 BCE is found at Ballyshannon.

== Births ==
- July 12 – Henry Boyle, 1st Baron Carleton, Chancellor of the Exchequer of England and Lord Treasurer of Ireland (d. 1725)
- Sir Tristram Beresford, 3rd Baronet, politician (d. 1701)
- William Cairnes, merchant and politician (d. 1707)
- Christopher Fleming, 17th Baron Slane, soldier and politician (d. 1726)
- Thomas Nugent, 4th Earl of Westmeath, soldier and noble (d. 1752)
- William Southwell, soldier and politician (d. 1720)

== Deaths ==
- Arthur Jones, 2nd Viscount Ranelagh, politician.
- Sir John Russell, 3rd Baronet, soldier (b. 1632?)
