= 1671 in Ireland =

- Centuries: 15th; 16th; 17th; 18th; 19th
- Decades: 1650s; 1660s; 1670s; 1680s; 1690s
- See also: Other events of 1671; List of years in Ireland

Events from the year 1671 in Ireland.

== Incumbent ==
- Monarch: Charles II

== Events ==
- January 18 – Royalist Sir Richard Talbot petitions King Charles II on behalf of the Catholic nobility and gentry.
- March 13 – the Parliament of England addresses the King against the growth of popery.
- April 22 – Navigation Act passed by the Parliament of England prohibits direct imports from the English colonies to Ireland.
- May 26 – John O'Molony is appointed Roman Catholic Bishop of Killaloe.
- June 10 – the King permits Sir George Hamilton to raise a regiment for service in France.
- August 1 – Prince Rupert of the Rhine heads his first commission into land settlement in Ireland.
- August 4 – Viscount Ranelagh undertakes to manage revenues of the Crown in Ireland.
- December 5 – Royal charter granted to The King's Hospital (Blue Coat School) in Dublin.

== Births ==
- Jonathan Smedley, religious opportunist and satirical victim who engaged in polemic with Jonathan Swift and the Tory party (d.1729)

== Deaths ==
- January – Dubhaltach Mac Fhirbhisigh, scribe, translator, historian and genealogist (murdered).
- April – William Caulfeild, 1st Viscount Charlemont (b. 1624)
- June – William St Lawrence, 12th Baron Howth (b. 1628)
- October - Samuel Mather (Independent minister) (b. 1626 in England) - nonconformist minister
