= 1674 in Ireland =

- Centuries: 15th; 16th; 17th; 18th; 19th
- Decades: 1650s; 1660s; 1670s; 1680s; 1690s
- See also: Other events of 1674; List of years in Ireland

Events from the year 1674 in Ireland.

== Incumbent ==
- Monarch: Charles II

== Events ==
- May 5 – The Hospital and Free School of King Charles II opens in Dublin.

== Births ==
- Mary Davys, novelist and playwright (died 1732)

== Deaths ==
- September 9 – Murrough O'Brien, 1st Earl of Inchiquin, a chieftain of the O'Briens and Protestant native Irish peer (born c. 1618)
