= Francis Burke (Dean of Elphin) =

Irish priest

Francis Burke (Dean of Elphin) (b Pellick, Fermoy, East Cork 1834 - d The Abbey, Boyle, Roscommon 19 February 1904) was a priest of the Church of Ireland.

Burke was born in County Cork and educated at Trinity College, Dublin. After curacies at Killaraght and Kilfree he was the Rector of Ardcane from 1874 to 1898. He was installed as Dean of Elphin on October 25, 1894. Based on two lectures, he published Loch Ce and its Annals in 1895. He married Mary Robertson (d 1898) of The Abbey, Boyle. They had two daughters, Miriam Jane Henrietta and Mary Emily. http://www.askaboutireland.ie/reading-room/digital-book-collection/digital-books-by-county/roscommon/burke-loch-ce-and-its-ann/
