= Peter A. French =

American philosopher and writer (born 1942)

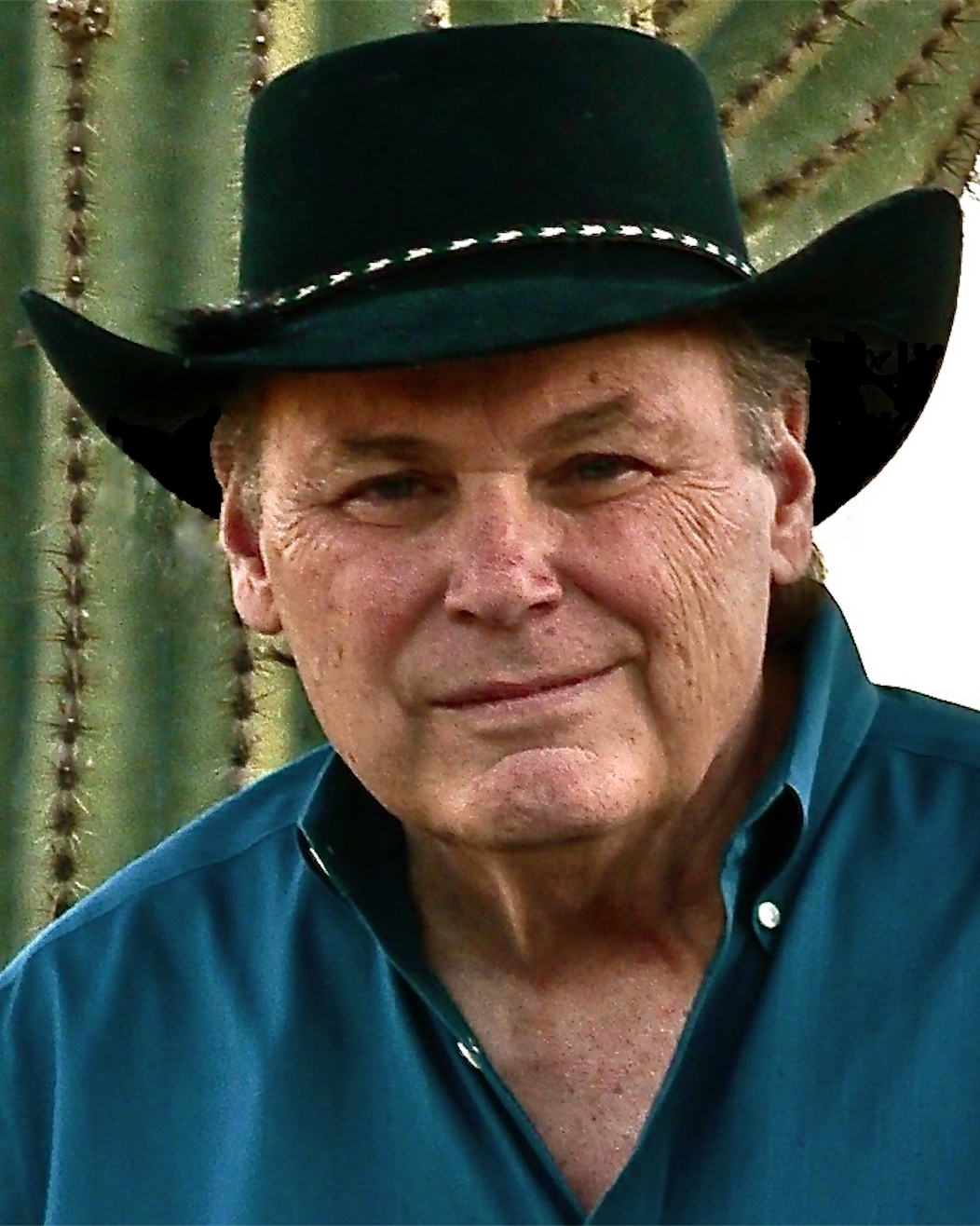
- Born: March 19, 1942 (age 84); Newburgh, New York, U.S.
- Education: Gettysburg College (BA); University of Southern California (MA); University of Miami (PhD); University of Oxford
- Occupations: Philosopher; writer

Peter A. French (born March 19, 1942) is an American philosopher and writer. He is Professor of Philosophy Emeritus at Arizona State University where he taught from 2000 until 2016. He previously was a professor at Northern Arizona University, University of Minnesota, Dalhousie University, Trinity University, and the University of South Florida.

== Early life ==
French was born in 1942 in Newburgh, New York. His father was a Lutheran minister, his mother died of cancer when he was five years old. He was raised in New York and New England and earned a BA (with majors in philosophy and religious studies) from Gettysburg College (1963), an MA in philosophy from the University of Southern California (1964) and a Ph.D. in philosophy from the University of Miami (1971). He did post-doctoral work at Oxford University.

== Career ==
French has been a professor of philosophy at Northern Arizona University, the University of Minnesota, and a visiting professor at Dalhousie University, Nova Scotia. He has held the Exxon Distinguished Research Professorship in the Center for the Study of Values at the University of Delaware, the Lennox Distinguished Professorship and Chair of Philosophy at Trinity University, and the Cole Chair in Ethics, Director of the Ethics Center, and Chair of the Department of Philosophy at the University of South Florida. He is now Professor of Philosophy Emeritus at Arizona State University where he served as the Lincoln Professor of Ethics and Professor of Philosophy, and was the founding Director of the Lincoln Center for Applied Ethics from 2000 to 2013.

French is the author of twenty-one books on a wide range of topics in ethics, metaethics and applied ethics. A number of his papers are translated into Chinese, Japanese, German, Italian, French, Serbian, and Spanish. He was the editor of the Journal of Social Philosophy for 16 years (1988–2005) and general editor of the seven volume Issues in Contemporary Ethics series in the 1970s. According to Zachary Goldberg, professor at Ludwig-Maximilians-Universität München, French's contributions to a wide spectrum of philosophical discussions made him an influential figure in the areas of moral responsibility and the agency of individuals and collectives.

French is best known for his work on collective and corporate responsibility, especially his theory that corporations should be treated as members of the moral community and held morally responsible for their actions. According to Professor Jeffrey Moriarty in the Stanford Encyclopedia of Philosophy French is "a seminal thinker on corporate moral agency." He is responsible for developing the argument that firms have internal decision-making structures through which they act intentionally. In "The Corporation as a Moral Person" French coined the term Corporate Internal Decision Structures (CID Structures) and defined a CID Structure as an organization of personnel for the exercise of a corporation's power with respect to its ventures and interests. According to French a CID Structure produces decision-making, ratification, and action processes thereby forming a corporation into a functioning intentional morally responsible entity. He identified two sorts of rules crucial to CID Structures: organizational rules and policy/procedure rules. Organizational rules define levels of authority. Policies and procedures are recognition rules for identifying a decision or an act as having been made or performed for corporate reasons. French expanded, defended, and modified this theory in publications in subsequent years. According to Michael Kerlin in the Journal of Business Ethics French's work on corporate ethics is "of intellectual sophistication with real world applications."

When the United States Supreme Court issued its ruling in Citizens United v. FEC, some philosophers and legal theorists wrote to French claiming his work had laid the groundwork for the treatment of corporations as persons and asked if he was willing to change his position on corporations and write an opinion piece for the New York Times. French declined and responded in a paper published in the festschrift honoring him that the Court's majority opinion does not represent his position on corporate moral personhood. French noted that Justice Antonin Scalia wrote in his concurring opinion that corporate speech is "the speech of many individual Americans who have associated in a common cause, giving the leadership of the corporation the right to speak on their behalf." French argued that corporations do not speak for their employees, stockholders, or others affiliated with them. There is no necessary connection between what corporate speech expresses and the beliefs, desires, interests, plans, and goals of such individuals. Corporations speak qua corporate entities and the political speech of individuals is already protected.

French distinguished two distinct types of collectivities in his discussions of collective responsibility: aggregates and conglomerates. According to Marian Smiley, French defines an aggregate collectivity as merely a group of people to whom collective responsibility cannot be ascribed. A conglomerate collectivity for French is an organization of individuals whose identity is not exhausted by the conjunction of the identities of the persons in the organization. Conglomerate collectivities can be held collectively responsible. On French's account, responsibility may be distributable or non-distributable over the membership of a collectivity depending on the type.

French also coined the term "the responsibility barter game" to describe the common way people negotiate with each other to try to lessen or avoid personal responsibility for bad outcomes. According to Jane E. Jadlos writing in The Journal of Religion for French "responsibility is not a truth of some sort about the world, but a set of practices used to describe and understand individual and social behavior." French has also written on moral assessment, evil, loss of innocence, blame, shame, vengeance, moral originality, and moral belief/behavior discordance. and he is a founding and senior editor of Midwest Studies in Philosophy, an annual series since 1976 in analytic philosophy.

The first chapter of French's War and Moral Dissonance is a memoir of his experiences teaching ethics to Navy and Marine chaplains during Iraq War. Colonel James L. Cook of the United States Air Force Academy in a review of that book says that French discusses ad bellum and in bello ethical lapses in the war, but delves into the metaphysical issues others ignore and examines the war's aftermath. French's treatment is philosophically rigorous, but also poetically touching...[it] combines philosophical acumen with profound empathy even for a single victim of war.”

In 2006 Gettysburg College awarded French a Doctor of Humane Letters (L.H.D.) degree for his work in philosophy and ethics. The citation read at the college’s 171st Commencement by then Gettysburg College President Katherine Will included the following: "Your book exploring the My Lai Massacre attracted national attention for its exploration of the question of whether army units or individual members of those units are responsible for military atrocities and is widely credited as a founding work of the field of applied ethics." In 2008 the American Philosophical Association dedicated an issue of its Newsletter on Philosophy and Law to French because of his "influence in applied ethics and having helped establish the field of applied ethics as a substantive area of research in the philosophy discipline." In 2014, the American Philosophical Association dedicated a Symposium Session on the Work of Peter French at its Central Division Meetings in Chicago.

== Selected book publications ==
- War and Moral Dissonance, Cambridge University Press, 2011. ISBN 9781107000483
- Ethics and College Sports, Rowman and Littlefield, 2004. ISBN 9780742512733
- The Virtues of Vengeance, University Press of Kansas, 2001. ISBN 9780700610761
- Cowboy Metaphysics: Ethics and Death in Westerns, Rowman and Littlefield, 1997. ISBN 9780847686711
- Corporate Ethics, Harcourt, Brace, 1995. ISBN 9780155011243
- Responsibility Matters, University Press of Kansas, 1992. ISBN 9780700606269
- Corporations in the Moral Community (with J. Nesteruk and D. Risser), Harcourt, Brace, 1992. ISBN 9780030307829
- The Spectrum of Responsibility, St. Martin's Press, 1991. ISBN 9780312034962
- Corrigible Corporations and Unruly Law (with Brent Fisse), Trinity University Press, 1985. ISBN 9780939980130
- Collective and Corporate Responsibility, Columbia University Press, 1984. ISBN 9780231058377
- Ethics in Government, Prentice-Hall, 1982. ISBN 978-0132909082
- The Scope of Morality, University of Minnesota Press, 1979 (also in Spanish translation). Reprinted 2009. ISBN 9780816609000
- Contemporary Perspectives in the Philosophy of Language (with H.K. Wettstein and T.E. Uehling), University of Minnesota Press, 1978. Reprinted 2009. ISBN 9780816608669
- Philosophical Explorations, Scott Foresman, 1978.
- Philosophers in Wonderland, Llewellyn Publications, 1975. ISBN 9780875422428
- Conscientious Actions, General Learning Press, 1974. ISBN 9780382212253
- Individual and Collective Responsibility, Schenkman Publishing, 1972. ASIN B000GL3IEI
- Individual and Collective Responsibility, Revised and Enlarged Second Edition, Schenkman Books, 1995. ISBN 9780870470707
- Exploring Philosophy, Schenkman Publishing, 1970, revised General Learning Press, 1972, abridged edition 1972.

== Selected published papers ==
- "Morally Blaming Whole Populations," in Philosophy, Morality, and International Affairs, ed. by Held, Morganbesser, and Nagel, Oxford University Press, 1974.
- "Can A Man Imagine Himself Witnessing His Own Funeral," in International Journal for the Philosophy of Religion, Vol. 5, No. 4, 1974.
- "Institutional and Moral Obligations or Merels and Morals," The Journal of Philosophy, Vol. LXXXIV, No. 10, October, 1977.
- "What is Hamlet to McDonnell-Douglas, McDonnell-Douglas to Hamlet: DC-10," in Business and Professional Ethics, Vol. 2, Spring, 1981.
- "Senses of 'Blame'," in Southern Journal of Philosophy, Winter, 1976.
- "The Corporation as a Moral Person," in American Philosophical Quarterly, July 1979.
- "Crowds and Corporations," in American Philosophical Quarterly, July 1982.
- "Kinds and Persons," in Philosophy and Phenomenological Research, 1983.
- "A Principle of Responsive Adjustment," in Philosophy, October 1984.
- "Why Did Wittgenstein Read Tagore to the Vienna Circle?" in Proto Soziologie, 1993
- "Integrity, Intentions, and Corporations," in American Business Law Journal, Volume 34/2, Winter, 1996.
- "Honor, Shame, and Identity," in Public Affairs Quarterly, Volume 16, Number 1, January 2002.
- "Moral Notions, Originality, and Some Examples," in Meaning and Morality: Essays on the Philosophy of Julius Kovesi, edited by Alan Tapper and T. Brian Mooney, Brill, 2012.
- "Complicity: That Moral Monster," in Criminal Law and Philosophy, 2014.
- "Self-Blaming, Repentance, and Atonement," in The Journal of Value Inquiry, Number 3, 2015.
- "Virtuous Avengers in Commonplace Cases," in Philosophia: Philosophical Quarterly of Israel, 2016.
- "The Diachronic Moral Responsibility of Firms," in The Moral Responsibility of the Firms, Eds. Eric Orts and Craig Smith, Oxford University Press, 2017.
