= 1662 in Ireland =

- Centuries: 15th; 16th; 17th; 18th; 19th
- Decades: 1640s; 1650s; 1660s; 1670s; 1680s
- See also: Other events of 1662; List of years in Ireland

Events from the year 1662 in Ireland.

== Incumbent ==
- Monarch: Charles II

== Events ==
- February 21 – James Butler, 1st Duke of Ormonde, returns to the office of Lord Lieutenant of Ireland (until 1669).
- September – regular Donaghadee to Portpatrick short sea sailings are established.
- Act of Settlement, passed by the Parliament of Ireland, orders that settlers under the Cromwellian Act of Settlement 1652 should give up a portion of their allotted land to "Old English" and "innocent Catholics". The first Court of Claims sits from 20 September 1662 to 21 August 1663.

== Arts and literature ==
- John Ogilby, Master of the Revels in Ireland, opens the first Theatre Royal, Dublin, in Smock Alley.

== Births ==
- April 9 – William Conolly, politician (d.1729)
- William O'Brien, 3rd Earl of Inchiquin, nobleman (d.1719)

== Deaths ==
- June 30 – Daniel O'Daly, diplomat and historian (b.1595)
