= 1745 in Ireland =

- Centuries: 16th; 17th; 18th; 19th; 20th
- Decades: 1720s; 1730s; 1740s; 1750s; 1760s
- See also: Other events of 1745; List of years in Ireland

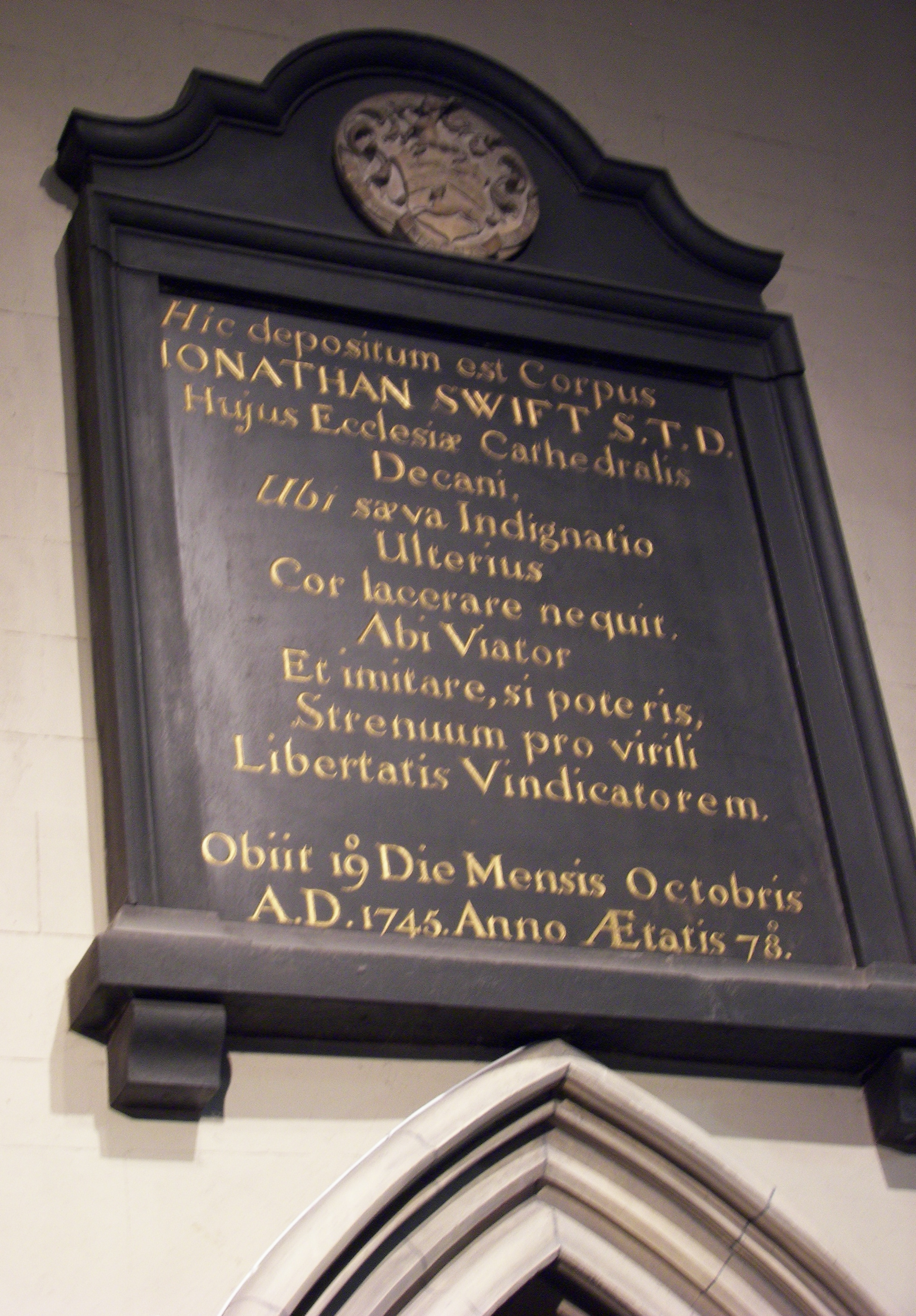
Swift's epitaph

Events from the year 1745 in Ireland.

== Incumbent ==
- Monarch: George II

== Events ==
- 19 October – Jonathan Swift, satirist and Dean of St. Patrick's Cathedral, Dublin, dies aged 78. His body is laid out in public for the people of Dublin to pay their last respects, and he is buried, in accordance with his wishes, in his cathedral by Esther Johnson's side with his own epitaph: Ubi sæva Indignatio / Ulterius / Cor lacerare nequit ("where savage indignation can no longer lacerate the heart").
- Bartholomew Mosse establishes the Dublin Lying-In Hospital.
- The town walls of Youghal are repaired.

== Births ==
- 14 April – Richard Annesley, 2nd Earl Annesley, politician (died 1824).
- 24 December – William Paterson, jurist in the United States (died 1806).

== Deaths ==
- 13 May – Charles Coffey, playwright and composer.
- 19 October – Jonathan Swift, cleric, satirist, essayist and poet (born 1667).
- 16 November – James Butler, 2nd Duke of Ormonde, soldier and statesman (born 1665).
