= Eaton baronets =

Extinct baronetcy in the Baronetage of Ireland

The Eaton Baronetcy of Dunmoylin, County Limerick was created in the Baronetage of Ireland on 21 February 1682 for Simon Eaton.

== Eaton baronets of Dunmoylin, County Limerick (1682) ==
- Sir Simon Eaton, 1st Baronet (died 16 December 1697). His only son predeceased him and the Baronetcy became extinct on his death.
