= 1672 in Ireland =

- Centuries: 15th; 16th; 17th; 18th; 19th
- Decades: 1650s; 1660s; 1670s; 1680s; 1690s
- See also: Other events of 1672; List of years in Ireland

Events from the year 1672 in Ireland.

== Incumbent ==
- Monarch: Charles II

== Events ==
- February 25 (6 March N.S.) – John O'Molony is consecrated as Roman Catholic Bishop of Killaloe in Paris.
- March 15 – King Charles II of England issues a Royal Declaration of Indulgence, suspending execution of Penal Laws against Roman Catholics in his realms; this is withdrawn the following year under pressure from the Parliament of England.
- May 21 – The Earl of Essex is appointed Lord Lieutenant of Ireland (sworn 5 August).
- September 24 – elected representatives on corporations are to take an Oath of Supremacy to the Crown unless exempted.
- The office of Lord President of Munster is suppressed.
- John Lynch's De praesulibus Hiberniae is written (first published in Dublin, 1944).
- Sir William Petty's Political Anatomy of Ireland is written (first published in Dublin, 1691); also, engraving of the maps for his Hiberniae Delineatio (published 1685) is completed.

== Births ==
- March 12 (bapt.) – Richard Steele, writer and politician, co-founder of The Spectator magazine (d. 1729)
- August 7 – Michael Hill, politician (d. 1699)
- William Blakeney, 1st Baron Blakeney, soldier (d. 1761)

== Deaths ==
- August 10 – Robert Leslie, Church of Ireland Bishop of Clogher.
- December 7 – Sir Paul Davys, politician and civil servant (b. c.1600)
- Approximate date
  - Thomas Carve, historian (b. 1590)
  - Thomas Dillon, 4th Viscount Dillon, peer (b. 1615)
