= 1742 in Ireland =

- Centuries: 16th; 17th; 18th; 19th; 20th
- Decades: 1720s; 1730s; 1740s; 1750s; 1760s
- See also: Other events of 1742; List of years in Ireland

Events from the year 1742 in Ireland.

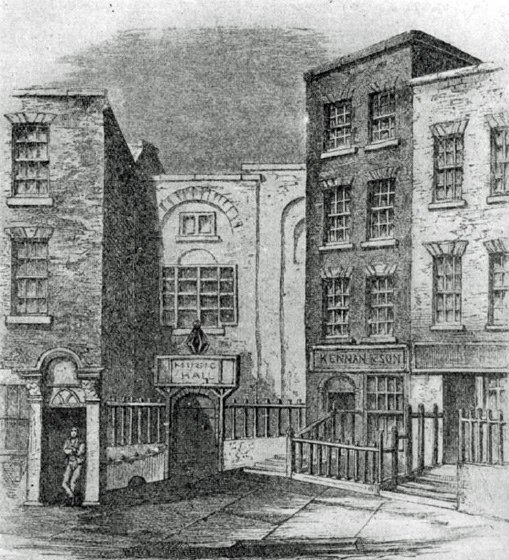
The Great Music Hall in Fishamble Street, Dublin, scene of the first performance of Handel's Messiah

== Incumbent ==
- Monarch: George II

== Events ==
- c. March – Newry Canal opened. On 28 March the Cope brings the first load of Tyrone coal carried from Lough Neagh to Dublin by this route.
- 13 April – first performance of Handel's Messiah staged at Neal's Music Hall in Fishamble Street, Dublin in aid of local charities. Matthew Dubourg leads the orchestra. Handel leaves Ireland on 13 August.

== Births ==
- John Prendergast Smyth, 1st Viscount Gort, politician (died 1817).

== Deaths ==
- September 27 – Hugh Boulter, Anglican Primate of All Ireland (born 1672)
  Full date unknown
  - James Arbuckle, poet and critic (born 1700).
