= Huguenot Cemetery, Dublin =

Huguenot Cemetery
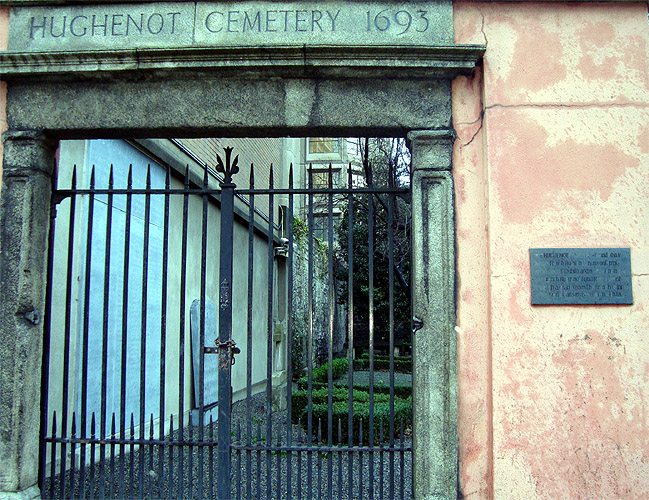
- Entrance
- Interactive map of Huguenot Cemetery

Details
- Established: 1693
- Closed: 1901
- Location: 10 Merrion Row, Dublin
- Country: Ireland
- Coordinates: 53.33863°N 6.254869°W
- Type: Huguenot
- Size: 630 m^{2} (6,800 sq ft)
- No. of interments: ~600
- Find a Grave: Huguenot Cemetery

The Huguenot Cemetery (Irish: Reilig na nÚgóineach, French: Cimetière huguenot de Dublin) is a small cemetery dating from 1693 located near St. Stephen's Green, Dublin, Ireland, beside the Shelbourne Hotel. Although often described as being on the green, it is actually on the north side of Merrion Row, a small street linking St. Stephen's Green with Upper Merrion Street and Ely Place.

Those buried there are descendants of Huguenots who fled persecution in France following the revocation of the Edict of Nantes which had guaranteed religious freedom. They were encouraged to come to Ireland by James Butler, 1st Duke of Ormonde, who had spent twelve years in exile in France, after the Irish and Royalist forces were defeated by those of Oliver Cromwell. Ormonde's return to Ireland as Viceroy in 1662 coincided with the consolidation of power by Louis XIV, which put extra pressure on the Huguenots in France. Ormonde had come into contact with Huguenots in Paris and Normandy, and hoped that their skills and capital could help stimulate the Irish economy and introduce new industries.

The Huguenots quickly established a thriving community in Dublin and elsewhere in Ireland based on their skills in textiles, watchmaking and finance. Within a short time they had become an integral part of the commercial and civic life of Dublin. Huguenot families in Ireland included the naturalized names of Busse, Des Voeux, Chaigneau, D'Olier, Gardie, Delamain, Le Fanu, L'Estrange, Maturin, Saurin, Lefroy, Le Nauze, Perrin, Cromelin, Borough (derived from Bouhéreau) and La Touche. The last burial was in 1901.

Part of the plaque at the cemetery

The cemetery is not open to visitors, though it is visible through the railings and a list of 239 surnames of those buried is inscribed on the wall plaque to the left. These include Becquett (relatives of Samuel Beckett) and Du Bédat.
