= 1746 in Ireland =

- Centuries: 16th; 17th; 18th; 19th; 20th
- Decades: 1720s; 1730s; 1740s; 1750s; 1760s
- See also: Other events of 1746; List of years in Ireland

Events from the year 1746 in Ireland.

== Incumbent ==
- Monarch: George II

== Events ==
- 19 March – an act of the Parliament of Great Britain prohibits the export of glass from Ireland.
- 26 March – King George II of Great Britain grants the Dublin Society £500 pa from the Privy Purse.
- 11 April – acts:
  - "for licensing hawkers and pedlars and for the encouragement of English Protestant schools" provides grants for charter schools.
  - preventing Irish subjects in the service of France or Spain from holding property.
  - to annul future marriages celebrated by Roman Catholic priests if either (or both) of the parties are Protestant.
- June – English preacher John Cennick arrives in Ireland to evangelise for the Moravian Church.
- 8 August – charter for St Patrick's Hospital for Imbeciles to be established in Dublin under the will of Jonathan Swift (died 1745).
- Charles Smith's The Ancient and Present State of the County and City of Waterford is published in Dublin.

== Arts and literature ==
- The National College of Art and Design originates as a private drawing school set up by the painter Robert West in Dublin.

== Births ==
- 3 July – Henry Grattan, member of Irish House of Commons and campaigner for legislative freedom for the Irish Parliament (died 1820).
- Thomas Hussey, diplomat, chaplain, and Bishop of the Roman Catholic Diocese of Waterford and Lismore (died 1803).

== Deaths ==
- 22 May – Thomas Southerne, dramatist (born 1660).
- 8 August – Francis Hutcheson, theologian and philosopher (born 1694).
