= 1654 in Ireland =

- Centuries: 15th; 16th; 17th; 18th; 19th
- Decades: 1630s; 1640s; 1650s; 1660s; 1670s
- See also: Other events of 1654; List of years in Ireland

Events from the year 1654 in Ireland.

== Incumbent ==
- Lord Protector: Oliver Cromwell

== Events ==
- 24 December – William Petty contracts to undertake an accurate survey of Ireland (the "Down Survey").
- English Parliamentarian supporters take control of Galway Corporation, dismissing the previous urban elite as "the Tribes of Galway".
- The Fraternity of Physicians of Trinity Hall, predecessor of the Royal College of Physicians of Ireland, is established in Dublin by Prof. John Stearne.
- William Edmondson establishes what is probably the first Quaker Meeting in Ireland at his house in Lurgan.
- Rathmacknee Castle and lands were confiscated after Thomas Rosseter fought against Oliver Cromwell at Wexford in the Irish Confederate Wars.

== Births ==
- 28 May – Thomas Handcock, politician (d.1726)
- 4 August – Thomas Brodrick, politician (d.1730)
- 11 September – William Handcock, lawyer and politician (d.1701)
- Sir Henry Bingham, 3rd Baronet, lawyer and politician (d.1714)
- Thomas Bligh, politician (d.1710)

== Deaths ==
- 5 May – Thomas Walsh, Roman Catholic Archbishop of Cashel, in exile.
- 12 May – William Tirry, martyred Roman Catholic priest, executed (b.1609)
