= William Creed (politician) =

Canadian politician

William Creed (ca 1743 – April 11, 1809) was an Irish-born ship owner, merchant and political figure in Prince Edward Island.

He was born in Limerick and came to New England after inheriting money. Creed moved to the Alberton area of Prince Edward Island in 1767 and then moved to Three Rivers, where he became the harbour master, around eight years later. He sailed his own ships, dealing with firms in New England and Canada. Creed had a number of children with a woman named Mary Spencer in Rhode Island. He later set up a store near Lower Montague and married Elizabeth Prince, the widow of David Higgins around 1785. Creed was elected to the Legislative Assembly of Prince Edward Island and was also a road surveyor. He died of cholera in Charlottetown in 1809.
