= 1680 in Ireland =

- Centuries: 15th; 16th; 17th; 18th; 19th
- Decades: 1660s; 1670s; 1680s; 1690s; 1700s
- See also: Other events of 1680; List of years in Ireland

Events from the year 1680 in Ireland.

== Incumbent ==
- Monarch: Charles II

== Events ==
- 29 April – construction of the Royal Hospital Kilmainham in Dublin as a home for retired soldiers begins to the design of Sir William Robinson.
- 23 July–24 July – trial of Oliver Plunkett, Roman Catholic Archbishop of Armagh and Primate of All Ireland, at Dundalk for conspiracy in the supposed "Popish Plot" ends without indictment and on 24 October he is transferred to London.
- English antiquarian Thomas Dingley tours Ireland.
- Edmund Borlase's The History of the execrable Irish Rebellion is published.

== Arts and literature ==
- The poem-book Leabhar Cloinne Aodha Buidhe is transcribed by Ruairí Ó hUiginn of Sligo at the command of Cormac Ó Neill.

== Births ==
- 4 October – Giles Alington, 4th Baron Alington (d.1691)
- Full date unknown
  - Richard Cantillon, economic theorist (d.1734)
  - Bernard MacMahon, Roman Catholic Bishop of Clogher, later Archbishop of Armagh (d.1747)
  - Approximate date – Cathal Buí Mac Giolla Ghunna, poet (d.1756)

== Deaths ==
- 30 July – Thomas Butler, 6th Earl of Ossory, soldier and politician (b.1634)
- 23 August – Thomas Blood, soldier, tried to steal the Crown Jewels of England from the Tower of London in 1671 (b.1618)
- September or October – William Steele, Lord Chancellor of Ireland (b.1610)
- c. 15 November – Peter Talbot, imprisoned Roman Catholic Archbishop of Dublin and Primate of Ireland (b.1620?)
