= 1689 in Ireland =

- Centuries: 15th; 16th; 17th; 18th; 19th
- Decades: 1660s; 1670s; 1680s; 1690s; 1700s
- See also: Other events of 1689; List of years in Ireland

Events from the year 1689 in Ireland.

== Incumbent ==
- Monarch: James II (de jure), deposed
- Monarch: William III and Mary II (starting 13 February)

== Events ==
- 9 January – Patrick Sarsfield, 1st Earl of Lucan marries Honora Burke, daughter of William Burke, 7th Earl of Clanricarde, in Portumna Abbey.
- 13 February – the Protestant William, Prince of Orange, and Mary II are proclaimed co-rulers of England, Ireland and Scotland in London following the deposition of the Catholic James II at the end of 1688 but are not yet recognised in Ireland or Scotland.
- February ("Bloody Monday") – Protestants in Bandon, County Cork, kill or drive out the town's Jacobite garrison whose General, Justin McCarthy, returns and rounds up the Protestant ringleaders.
- 8 March – Lieutenant-General Richard Hamilton, having defected to the Jacobite cause, is dispatched from Drogheda with 2,000 men to pacify the north east of Ireland.
- 12 March – start of the Williamite War in Ireland: James II lands at Kinsale with 6,000 French soldiers, is met by Major-General McCarthy and marches for Dublin. He is joined by the Earl of Tyrconnel with Irish Catholic troops at Cork on 14 March.
- 14 March – Break of Dromore: Battle near Dromore, County Down, between Catholic Jacobite troops under Hamilton and Protestant Williamites under Lord Mount Alexander, who are broken and scattered.

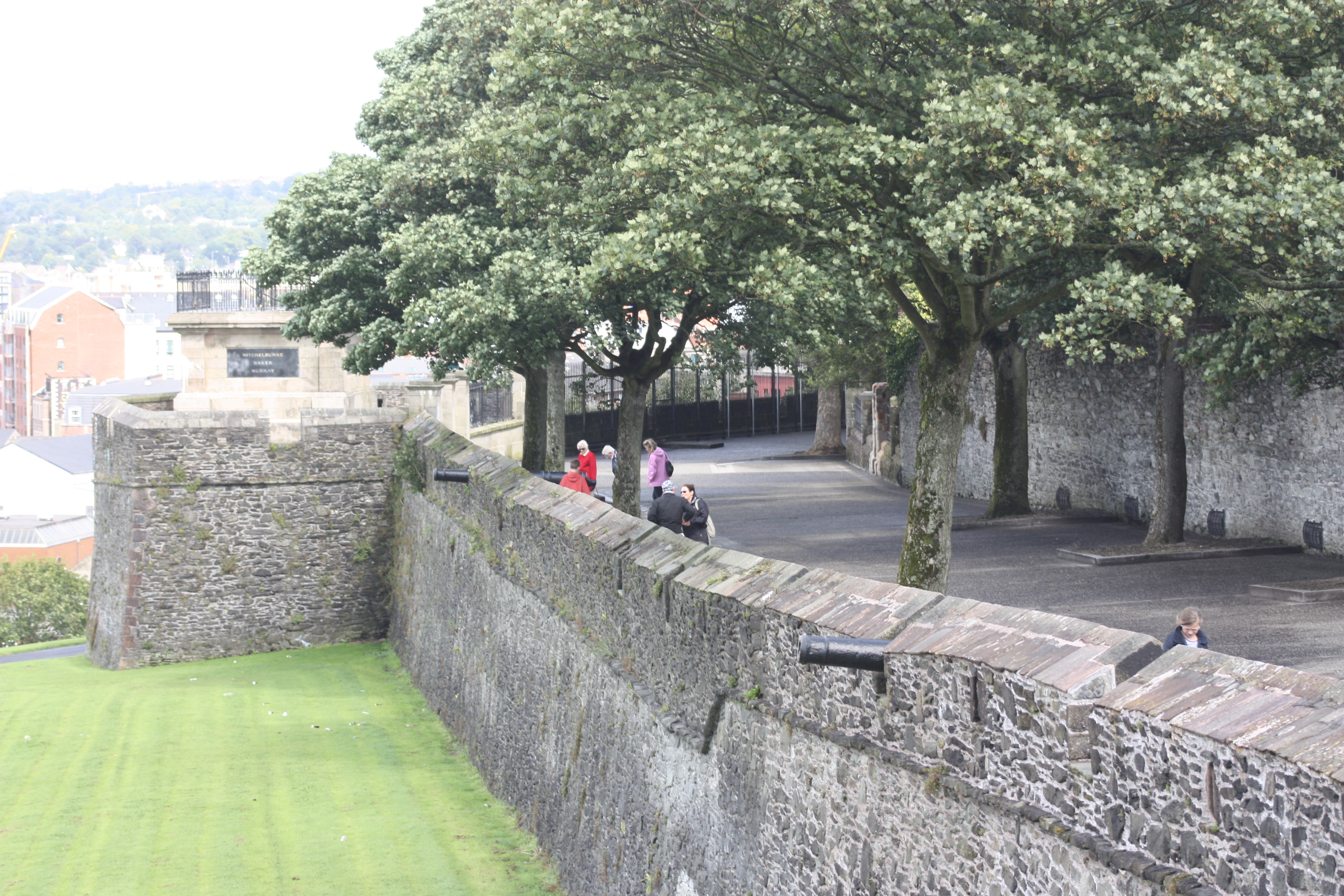
The Walls of Derry.

- 21 March – Robert Lundy swears allegiance to William III and Mary II and is commissioned as governor of Derry, where he commands the garrison.
- 27 March – General Richard Hamilton is checked at Coleraine by Colonel Gustavus Hamilton.
- 7 April – Richard Hamilton's troops cross the River Bann in boats at Portglenone, causing Coleraine to be evacuated.
- 15 April – Battle of the Fords: In separate actions near Strabane, Jacobite forces under Marshal Conrad de Rosen and General Richard Hamilton force Lundy's troops back to Derry.
- 16 April – Siege of Derry: English ships having arrived in Lough Foyle with reinforcements under Colonel Cunningham, Governor Robert Lundy dissuades the officers from landing on the grounds that the city's position is hopeless.
- 18 April – James II arrives at Derry and asks for its surrender. This is refused by Majors Henry Baker and George Walker, now in command of its defences.
- 20 April – James II leaves Derry for Dublin and Robert Lundy secretly flees Derry for Scotland.
- 1 May (11 May N.S.) – Battle of Bantry Bay between the English Royal Navy under the Earl of Torrington and the French fleet under the Marquis de Châteaurenault. The French are able to protect their transports unloading supplies for James II and withdraw unpursued.
- 6 May and 4 June – General Richard Hamilton, left in command of the siege of Derry, makes unsuccessful attacks on Windmill Hill.
- 7 May–20 July – first and only session of the Patriot Parliament, the Parliament of Ireland called by James II in Dublin, with Richard Nagle as Speaker. This declares that James remains King, passes The Great Act of Attainder against those who have rebelled against him and repeals the Act of Settlement (1662) while, at James's urging, also passing an Act for Liberty of Conscience.
- 11 June – Siege of Derry: Royal Navy warships under George Rooke arrive in Lough Foyle but refuse to risk shore fire to break through the boom across the River Foyle at Culmore.
- 28 July
  - Relief of the siege of Derry after 105 days: the English ships Mountjoy, Phoenix and Jerusalem (under protection of HMS Dartmouth) break through the floating boom across the Foyle to end the siege.
  - The Jacobite army encamps near Enniskillen and bombards the Williamite outpost of Crom Castle.
- 31 July – Battle of Newtownbutler: Williamite irregulars under Colonel William Wolseley secure a victory over poorly trained Jacobite troops led by Justin McCarthy (now Viscount Mountcashel).
- 8 August – a thanksgiving service for the relief of Derry is held in St Columb's Cathedral.
- 13 August – unopposed landing by the Duke of Schomberg with Williamite forces at Ballyholme Bay in County Down.
- 27 August – Schomberg captures Carrickfergus after several days of siege and begins to march unopposed to Dundalk where he establishes Dundalk Camp. Here he is faced by Jacobite forces led by the Earl of Tyrconnell, but the two sides do not come to battle before Schomberg retires to winter quarters in Lisburn.
- Autumn – Jacobites occupy and burn down the castle at Castlebellingham.
- Micheál Ó Mordha becomes the only Roman Catholic Provost of Trinity College Dublin, following the flight of the previous office holder. With Dominic Maguire and the librarian, Father McCarthy, he prevents the Jacobite soldiery from burning the library.
- Richard Cox begins publication of his history of Ireland, Hibernia Anglicana.
- Ambrose Wall, Sheriff of Wicklow, oversees the re-erection of a 10th-century high cross at St. John's Church, Ballymore Eustace in County Kildare.

== Births ==
- James Barry, politician (d. 1743)
- Lady Mary Butler, younger daughter of the 2nd Duke of Ormonde and Jonathan Swift's "greatest favourite" (d. 1713)

== Deaths ==
- July – William Domville, lawyer and politician (b. 1609)
- November – John Davys, politician (b. 1646)
