= 1673 in Ireland =

- Centuries: 15th; 16th; 17th; 18th; 19th
- Decades: 1650s; 1660s; 1670s; 1680s; 1690s
- See also: Other events of 1673; List of years in Ireland

Events from the year 1673 in Ireland.

== Incumbent ==
- Monarch: Charles II

== Events ==
- June – Peter Talbot, Roman Catholic Archbishop of Dublin and Primate of Ireland, goes into exile.
- Parliament of England votes an annual Regium Donum to augment the stipends of Presbyterian clergy in Ireland.
- Michael Boyle begins construction of Blessington House in Blessington, County Wicklow.

== Births ==
- date unknown – George Wade, British army officer (d. 1748)

== Deaths ==
- 9 February – James Barry, 1st Baron Barry of Santry, lawyer (b. 1603)
- 6 June – James Hamilton, British army officer (b. c.1620)
