= Mary Joseph Butler =

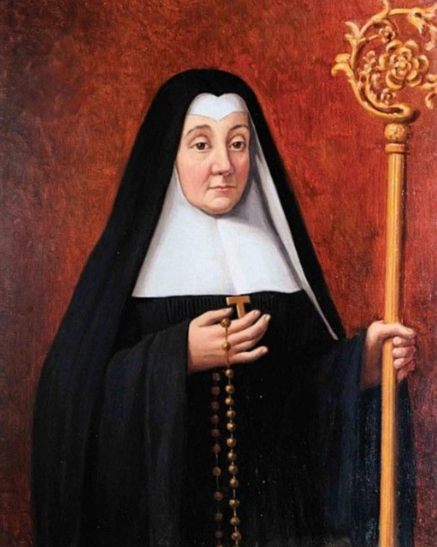
- 3rd Abbess at Ypres
- Title: Dame, Nun, Abbess

Personal life
- Born: 1641 Callan, County Kilkenny, Ireland
- Died: 22 December 1723 (aged 81–82) Ypres, Flanders
- Education: Benedictine convent at Boulogne

Religious life
- Religion: Christian
- Order: Benedictine
- Institute: Abbey
- Church: Our Lady of Grace, at Ypres, Flanders
- Initiation: 4 November 1657

Dame Mary Joseph Butler (December 1641 – 22 December 1723) was the first Irish Abbess of the Irish Benedictine Abbey of Our Lady of Grace, at Ypres, Flanders.

== Early life ==
Butler was born at Callan, County Kilkenny, Ireland. Lady Abbess Knatchbull of the English Benedictine Dames at Ghent was her aunt and Butler was sent to her for her education. Butler petitioned, when she was twelve years old to be allowed enter the order. She was allowed to enter two years later. She made her religious profession 4 November 1657, at the English Benedictine convent at Boulogne, at the age of sixteen.

== Ypres ==
In 1665 Ypres was founded from the mother-house of Ghent. Dame Beaumont was abbess, when she died in 1682, the decision was made to convert the house at Ypres into a national foundation for the Irish Benedictine nuns of the various houses founded from Ghent. Dame Butler accordingly was sent to Ypres in 1683, and, on the death of the second abbess Dame Flavia Cary, in 1686, she was elected Abbess of the Irish Dames of Ypres on the 29 August.

== Dublin Convent ==
King James II was looking to set up foundations in Ireland and Butler was asked help found a new Benedictine foundation in Dublin. By letters-patent or charter, which is dated in the sixth year of his reign, and still preserved in the convent of Ypres, King James confers upon this his "first and chief Royal Monastery of Gratia Dei", an annuity of one hundred pounds sterling to be paid forever out of his exchequer, and appoints his "well-beloved Dame Mary Butler" first abbess. Her brother was King James's Chief Cup-bearer for Ireland, a hereditary title in the Butler family, as their name implies. Abbess Butler set out for Dublin in 1688. She and her nuns were presented, in the Benedictine habit, to the Queen, Mary of Modena at Palace of Whitehall. Towards the end of the year she arrived in Dublin, and took up residence in a house in Great Ship Street. Here the Divine Office and regular observance began and a school was opened. About thirty young girls of the first families came to the nuns for their education and no less than eighteen of them expressed a wish to become religious.

This was interrupted by the entry of the Williamite forces into Dublin, after the Battle of the Boyne. The convent was sacked by his soldiers, and the nuns forced to seek refuge nearby. The church valuables were saved by the presence of mind of a lay sister, Placida Holmes, who disguised herself in secular clothes, and mingled with the plunderers. As a result, the Dublin convent was closed. Dame Butler's cousin, the Duke of Ormonde, although Protestant, offered her his special protection if she would remain in Ireland. However she decided to return to Ypres. The Duke arranged a passport (still preserved at Ypres) from the Prince of Orange which permitted her and her nuns to leave the country without molestation. Dame Butler hoped that time would allow her to return to Ireland to continue the foundation of the monastery. But in fact the community remained in Ypres for the next 200 years.

== Return to Ypres ==
The community made their way back to Ypres. The house in Ypres was poorly funded until 1700, several new and wealthier women joined the house and assisted Butler in keeping up the choir and regular observance. She continued to govern her flock until when she died in 1723. Butler was succeeded by Margaret (Xaviera) Arthur who was another Irish born nun who had joined the Ypres community in 1695.

Despite surviving the French revolution, the only religious house in the Low countries to do so, a result of the Great War was that the community left Ypres in 1920 and moved to Ireland to Kylemore Abbey where they currently remain.
