= 1744 in Ireland =

- Centuries: 16th; 17th; 18th; 19th; 20th
- Decades: 1720s; 1730s; 1740s; 1750s; 1760s
- See also: Other events of 1744; List of years in Ireland

Events from the year 1744 in Ireland.

== Incumbent ==
- Monarch: George II

== Events ==
- 26 February – a house in Pill Lane, Dublin, collapses while Roman Catholic mass is being held there, killing the priest and nine of the congregation.
- 14 April – the Physico-Historical Society is formed in Dublin for the preservation of 'manuscripts, rare printed books, and natural curiosities relating to Ireland'.
- 20 April – Arthur Price is translated from Meath to become Church of Ireland Archbishop of Cashel (letters patent 7 May).
- 23 May – the Hospital for Incurables is opened in Dublin as a charitable institution.
- 1 August (12 August New Style) – Battle of Velletri in the Kingdom of Naples: Spanish-Neapolitan forces defeat those of the Archduchy of Austria. Irish mercenaries fight on both sides.
- 3 August – the Colthurst Baronetcy, of Ardrum in the County of Cork, is created in the Baronetage of Ireland.
- c. October – wet and cold season, leading to oats and potatoes being spoiled in the north – the 'rot year'.

== Arts and literature ==
- 5 February – Spranger Barry makes his stage debut at the Theatre Royal, Dublin (Smock Alley).
- 6 December – first performance of Handel's Irish-premiered oratorio Messiah in Cork, at St. Finbarr's Cathedral.
- Drawing school of the Dublin Society is founded.

== Births ==
- 11 July – Pierce Butler, soldier, planter, statesman, one of United States' Founding Fathers, represented South Carolina in the Continental Congress and the U.S. Senate (died 1822).
  Full date unknown
  - Robert Brooke, soldier, Governor of St Helena (died 1811).
  - Bishop James Murphy, Bishop of Clogher 1801–1824 (died 1824).
  - Robert Owenson, actor and author (died 1812).

== Deaths ==
- 11 January – James Hamilton, 7th Earl of Abercorn (born 1686).
- 23 January – Thomas Griffith, actor (born 1680).
