= Joseph Atkinson (dramatist) =

- Born: 1743
- Died: 1818 (aged 74–75)
- Occupation: Playwright

Joseph Atkinson (1743–1818), was an Irish dramatist. He served in the army until he obtained a captain's commission.

== Works ==
In 1785, Atkinson produced a comedy in Dublin, the Mutual Deception, which, in the following year, was altered by Colman, the serious scenes being omitted, and, under the title of Tit for Tat presented at the Haymarket. Atkinson professed himself indebted to an Italian original for the comic portion of his play, which was found closely to resemble the earlier comedies of The Double Deceit and Love's Metamorphosis, first performed in 1735 and 1776 respectively. In 1786, Atkinson produced in Dublin A Match for a Widow, or the Frolics of Fancy, an opera in three acts to music by Dibdin, founded upon a French comedy, which Mrs. Inchbald had previously converted into the English play of The Widow's Vow and of which Miss Sheridan had availed herself in writing her farce of the Ambiguous Lover.

In 1800, Atkinson produced at the Cork Street Theatre a comic opera called Love in a Blaze, borrowed from a French play, which had done duty in an English form as Gallic Gratitude at Covent Garden in 1779. The music to Love in a Blaze was composed by John Andrew Stevenson, to whose assistance the production is said to have been indebted for the success it obtained.
