= 1660 in Ireland =

- Centuries: 15th; 16th; 17th; 18th; 19th
- Decades: 1640s; 1650s; 1660s; 1670s; 1680s
- See also: Other events of 1660; List of years in Ireland

Events from the year 1660 in Ireland.

== Incumbent ==
- Monarch: monarchy re-established, Charles II (starting 23 April)

== Events ==
- April 23 – Charles II becomes King of England, Scotland and Ireland.
- June – George Monck, 1st Duke of Albemarle, one of the principal architects of Charles II's Restoration, is appointed Lord Lieutenant of Ireland, although represented by deputies.
- August 16 – an Indemnity and Oblivion Act is sent to Ireland by Sir Paul Davys, granting indemnities to those who had been active in the Interregnum.
- First synagogue in Ireland established in Dublin.

== Births ==
- April 16 – Hans Sloane, physician and collector (d.1753)

=== Date unknown ===
- Hugh MacMahon, Roman Catholic Bishop of Clogher, later Archbishop of Armagh (d.1737)
- Thomas Southerne, dramatist (d.1746)
