= 1741 in Ireland =

- Centuries: 16th; 17th; 18th; 19th; 20th
- Decades: 1720s; 1730s; 1740s; 1750s; 1760s
- See also: Other events of 1741; List of years in Ireland

Events from the year 1741 in Ireland.

== Incumbent ==
- Monarch: George II

== Events ==
- January–April – Great Irish Famine (1740–1741) at its height.
- June–August – hot summer. The harvest is improved, but disease encouraged.
- 2 October – the Bull's Head Musical Society opens a Music Hall in Fishamble Street, Dublin.
- 18 November – the composer George Frideric Handel arrives in Dublin to give a series of concerts.
- Commencement of construction of obelisk and other works on Killiney Hill (overlooking Dublin Bay) by John Mapas to relieve poverty.
- Completion of rebuilding of Powerscourt House in County Wicklow by the architect Richard Cassels.

== Births ==
- 23 June – William Trench, 1st Earl of Clancarty, politician and statesman (died 1805).
- 4 October – Edmond Malone, Shakespeare scholar and literary critic (died 1812).
- 11 October – James Barry, painter (died 1806).
- Approximate date – Bryan Higgins, chemist (died 1818)

== Deaths ==
- 16 March – Thomas FitzMaurice, 1st Earl of Kerry, politician (born 1668).
- John Ussher, soldier and politician (born 1682).
