= James Arthur (theologian) =

17th century Irish theologian

James Arthur was a Dominican friar and theologian. He was born in Limerick, Ireland, early in the 17th century and died most likely in 1670.

Arthur became a member of the Dominican Order in the convent of St. Stephen at Salamanca, Spain, and taught theology in different convents of his order, especially at Salamanca, with great credit to himself and profit to his numerous students.

In 1640 Arthur was called to the University of Coimbra as first professor of theology, and held this chair until 1642. On the occasion of the separation of Portugal from Spain, he was expelled for refusing to take the oath to defend the doctrine of the Immaculate Conception. He returned to the convent of St. Dominic in Lisbon, where he resided for many years and devoted himself to the preparation of a commentary on the Summa Theologiae of Thomas Aquinas. This was to have comprised ten volumes, but he died after two. Only the first was printed, in 1655.

The Dominican historiographers Jacques Quétif and Jacques Échard give February, 1644, as the date of his death, but the consensus is in favour of 1670. He was buried where he died, in the convent of St. Dominic, Lisbon, Portugal.
