= Francis Burke (Franciscan) =

Irish Friar Minor and scholar

Francis Burke, O.F.M. (died 1697), was an Irish Franciscan friar and writer.

Born in Galway sometime early in the 17th century, Burke was among those expelled from the local Franciscan convent in 1652. He died in Italy in 1697. His only known work, Directorium Concionatorium, I and II, was published in Prague in 1690.
