= Peter French (Dominican) =

Peter French (died 1693) was an Irish theologian. Originally from Galway, French joined the Dominican Order in the south of Spain. He spent thirty years as a missionary friar among the Indians in Mexico. His book, A Catechism or Exposition of the Christian Faith was written in the "Mexican language", but it is uncertain if it was ever printed. He returned to Ireland and died in Galway in 1693.

== See also ==
- Seán an tSalainn French
- Christopher French (theologian)
- Robert French (1716–1779)
