= 1692 in Ireland =

- Centuries: 15th; 16th; 17th; 18th; 19th
- Decades: 1670s; 1680s; 1690s; 1700s; 1710s
- See also: Other events of 1692; List of years in Ireland

Events from the year 1692 in Ireland.

== Incumbent ==
- Monarch: William III and Mary II

== Events ==
- 24 February – the Treaty of Limerick is ratified.
- 5 October – the first meeting of the Parliament of Ireland under William III is held. This is the first time it has met for 26 years (apart from the Patriot Parliament of 1689). It passes An Act of Recognition of their Majesties undoubted Right to the Crown of Ireland.
- November – Henri de Massue, 2nd Marquis de Ruvigny, a French Huguenot soldier in English service and commander in chief in Ireland for a time this year, is created Viscount Galway and Baron Portarlington in the Peerage of Ireland and receives a large grant of seized estates in Ireland.

== Deaths ==
- 24 August – William Stewart, 1st Viscount Mountjoy, soldier (b. 1653) (killed at Battle of Steenkerque)
- Patrick Tyrrell, Roman Catholic Bishop of Meath.
