= Penal law (British) =

Laws against Catholics and other nonconformists

In English history, the penal laws were a series of laws that sought to enforce the State-decreed religious monopoly of the Church of England and, following the 1688 revolution, of Presbyterianism in Scotland, against the continued existence of illegal and underground communities of Catholics, nonjuring Anglicans, and Protestant nonconformists. The Penal laws also imposed various forfeitures, civil penalties, and civil disabilities upon recusants from mandatory attendance at weekly Sunday services of the Established Church. The penal laws in general were repealed in the early 19th-century due to the successful activism of Daniel O'Connell for Catholic Emancipation. Penal actions are civil in nature and were not English common law.

== Marian persecutions ==
In 1553, following the death of her half-brother, Edward VI, and deposing his choice of successor, Lady Jane Grey, Mary I of England seized the throne and soon after repealed both the religious legislation of her half-brother and that of her father Henry VIII through the First Statute of Repeal (1 Mar. Sess. 2. c. 2), re-establishing the Roman Catholic Church as official in England, Wales, and Ireland.

Mary I established an English inquisition to identify and to coerce into conversion, force into exile, or prosecute persons not conforming to Roman Catholicism. During Mary I's five year reign, over 300 Protestant dissenters were labeled heretics and killed and many more were exiled, leading English Protestants to nickname the queen "Bloody Mary." A list of Protestant martyrs of the English Reformation was published soon after her death.

- November 1554 - Mary revived the Heresy Acts (1 & 2 Ph. & M. c. 6), outlawing all Protestant literature and believers, it would be repealed a year after her death.

== Elizabethan ==
- The Act of Supremacy 1558 (1 Eliz. 1. c. 1), confirmed Elizabeth as Supreme Governor of the Church of England, and imposed an Oath of Supremacy which required any person taking public or church office in England to swear allegiance to the monarch as Supreme Governor of the Church of England. It also made it a crime to assert the authority of any foreign prince, prelate, or other authority, and was aimed at abolishing the authority of the Pope in England. All who maintained the spiritual or ecclesiastical authority of any foreign prelate were to forfeit all goods and chattels, both real and personal, and all benefices for the first offence, or in case the value of these was below 20 pounds, to be imprisoned for one year; they were liable to the forfeitures of praemunire for the second offence. The penalties of praemunire were: exclusion from the sovereign's protection, forfeiture of all lands and goods, arrest to answer to the Sovereign and Council.
- The Act of Uniformity 1558 (1 Eliz. 1. c. 2) set the order of prayer to be used in the English Book of Common Prayer and required all persons to go to church once a week or be fined. It punished all clerics who used any other service by deprivation and imprisonment.
- The Supremacy of the Crown Act 1562 (5 Eliz. 1. c. 1) made a second offence of refusing to take the Oath of Supremacy treason.

=== Response to Regnans in Excelsis ===
In 1570 Pope Pius V excommunicated Queen Elizabeth I, citing as his reasons heresy, Caesaropapism, and the religious persecution by the State of the illegal and underground Catholic Church in England and Wales, and in Ireland, by releasing the Papal bull Regnans in Excelsis. In response:

- 13 Eliz. 1. c. 1 made it high treason to affirm that the queen ought not to enjoy the Crown, or to declare her to be a heretic or schismatic;
- 13 Eliz. 1. c. 2, which made it high treason to put into effect any papal Bull of absolution, to absolve or reconcile any person to the Catholic Church, or to be so absolved or reconciled, or to procure or publish any papal Bull or writing whatsoever. The penalties of praemunire were enacted against all who brought into England or who gave to others "Agnus Dei" or articles blessed by the pope or by any one through faculties from him.
- 13 Eliz. 1. c. 3, was designed to stop Catholics from taking refuge abroad, and declared that any subject departing the realm without the queen's license, and not returning within six months, should forfeit the profits of his lands during life and all his goods and chattels.
- The Act to retain the Queen's Majesty's subjects in their obedience (23 Eliz. 1. c. 1), passed in 1581. This made it high treason to reconcile anyone or to be reconciled to "the Romish religion", prohibited Mass under penalty of a fine of two hundred marks and imprisonment for one year for the celebrant, and a fine of one hundred marks and the same imprisonment for those who heard the Mass. This act also increased the penalty for not attending the Anglican service to the sum of twenty pounds a month, or imprisonment till the fine be paid, or till the offender went to the Anglican Church. A further penalty of ten pounds a month was inflicted on anyone keeping a schoolmaster who did not attend the Anglican service. The schoolmaster himself was to be imprisoned for one year.
- The Jesuits, etc. Act 1584 commanded all Roman Catholic priests to leave the country in 40 days or they be punished for high treason, unless within the 40 days they swore an oath to obey the Queen. Those who harboured them, and all those who knew of their presence and failed to inform the authorities would be fined and imprisoned, or where the authorities wished to make an example of them, they might be executed. This statute, under which most of the English martyrs suffered, made it high treason for any Jesuit or any seminary priest to be in England at all, and felony for any one to harbour or relieve them. The penalties of praemunire were imposed on all who sent assistance to the seminaries abroad, and a fine of 100 pounds for each offence on those who sent their children overseas without the royal licence.

== Clarendon Code ==
While some of the Penal Laws were much older, they took their most drastic shape during the reign of Charles II, especially the laws known as the Clarendon Code and the Test Act.

The four penal laws collectively known as Clarendon Code are named after Charles II's chief minister Edward Hyde, 1st Earl of Clarendon, though Clarendon was neither their author nor fully in favour of them. These included:

- the Corporation Act 1661 (13 Cha. 2 St. 2. c. 1) required all municipal officials to take Anglican communion, and formally reject the Solemn League and Covenant of 1643. The effect of this act was to exclude nonconformists from public office. While the legislation was not rescinded until 1828, the legal power to enforce it lapsed in 1663, and therefore many evicted officials were able to regain their positions after a few years.
- the Act of Uniformity 1662 (14 Cha. 2. c. 4) made use of the Book of Common Prayer compulsory in religious service. Over two thousand clergy refused to comply and so were forced to resign their livings (the Great Ejection). The provisions of the act were modified by the Act of Uniformity Amendment Act 1872 (35 & 36 Vict. c. 35).
- the Conventicle Act 1664 (16 Cha. 2. c. 4) forbade conventicles (a meeting for unauthorised worship) of more than five people who were not members of the same household. The purpose was to prevent dissenting religious groups from meeting.
- the Five Mile Act 1665 (17 Cha. 2. c. 2) forbade nonconformist ministers from coming within five miles of incorporated towns or the place of their former livings. They were also forbidden to teach in schools. Most of the act's effects were repealed by 1689, but it was not formally abolished until 1812.

Combined with the Test Act 1673 (25 Cha. 2. c. 2), the Corporation Act 1661 (13 Cha. 2 St. 2. c. 1) excluded all nonconformists from holding civil or military office, and prevented them from being awarded degrees by the universities of Cambridge and Oxford.

== Further penal laws in Great Britain ==
In the late 17th and 18th centuries, many non-conformist Protestants successfully evaded the political disabilities imposed by the Test Act by taking communion in the Church of England as required, while otherwise attending non-conformist meetings. High churchmen and Tories, empowered late in Queen Anne's reign, sought to close this loophole with the passing of the Occasional Conformity Bill in 1711, however the Act was repealed after the Hanoverian Succession with the return to power of the Whig political party, who were generally allied with non-conforming Protestants. This led, as well, to a systematic political purge of both real and suspected Tories.

In the wake of the Jacobite Rising of 1715, the British parliament also passed the Disarming Act 1715 (1 Geo. 1. St. 2. c. 54).

Papists Act 1732
- Act of Parliament
- Parliament of Great Britain
- Long title: An Act for allowing further time for the Inrolment of Deeds and Wills made by Papists, and for Relief of Protestant Purchasers and Lessees.
- Citation: 6 Geo. 2. c. 5
- Territorial extent: Great Britain

Dates
- Royal assent: 21 March 1733
- Commencement: 16 January 1733 (Note: Start of session.)
- Repealed: 15 July 1867
Other legislation
Repealed by	Statute Law Revision Act 1867
Relates to	Papists Act 1716; Papists Act 1722; Papists Act 1723; Price of Bread, etc. Act 1729; Papists Act 1734

Status: Repealed

Text of statute as originally enacted

The Papists Act 1732 (6 Geo. 2. c. 5) was an Act of Parliament (United Kingdom) of the Parliament of Great Britain during the reign of George II. Its long title was "An Act for allowing further time for the Inrolment of Deeds and Wills made by Papists, and for Relief of Protestant Purchasers and Lessees".

The Whig single party state would continue to dominate the political and religious life of the British Empire until King George III ascended to the throne and allowed the Tories back into the Government in 1763. Even then, the Whig party remained a political monolith and only fragmented in response to the American and French Revolutions.

The whole act was repealed by section 1 of, and the schedule to, the Statute Law Revision Act 1867 (30 & 31 Vict. c. 59).

== Penal laws in Ireland ==
The Penal Laws were introduced into Ireland in the year 1695, disenfranchising nonconformists in favour of the minority established Church of Ireland, aligned with the Protestant Church of England. The laws' principal victims were members of the Catholic Church, numbering over three quarters of the population in the south, and adherents of the Presbyterian Church in Ireland, a majority of the population in Ulster. These laws included:

- Education Act 1695
- Banishment Act 1697
- Registration Act 1704
- Popery Act 1704 and 1709
- Disenfranchising Act 1728

The laws were eventually repealed, beginning in the 1770s by the 1774 Quebec Act and the Papists Act 1778. The British Roman Catholic Relief Act 1791 was followed in Ireland in 1793. Finally in 1829 Catholic emancipation was enacted, largely due to Irish political agitation organised under Daniel O'Connell in the 1820s. Sectarianism between Catholics and Protestants persisted through the 20th century, and its effects can still be seen, particularly in Northern Ireland, today.

== See also ==
- Regnans in Excelsis
- Declaration of Indulgence
- Gove's Rebellion
- Religion in the United Kingdom
