= Protestant Ascendancy =

17th to 20th-century Anglican domination of Ireland

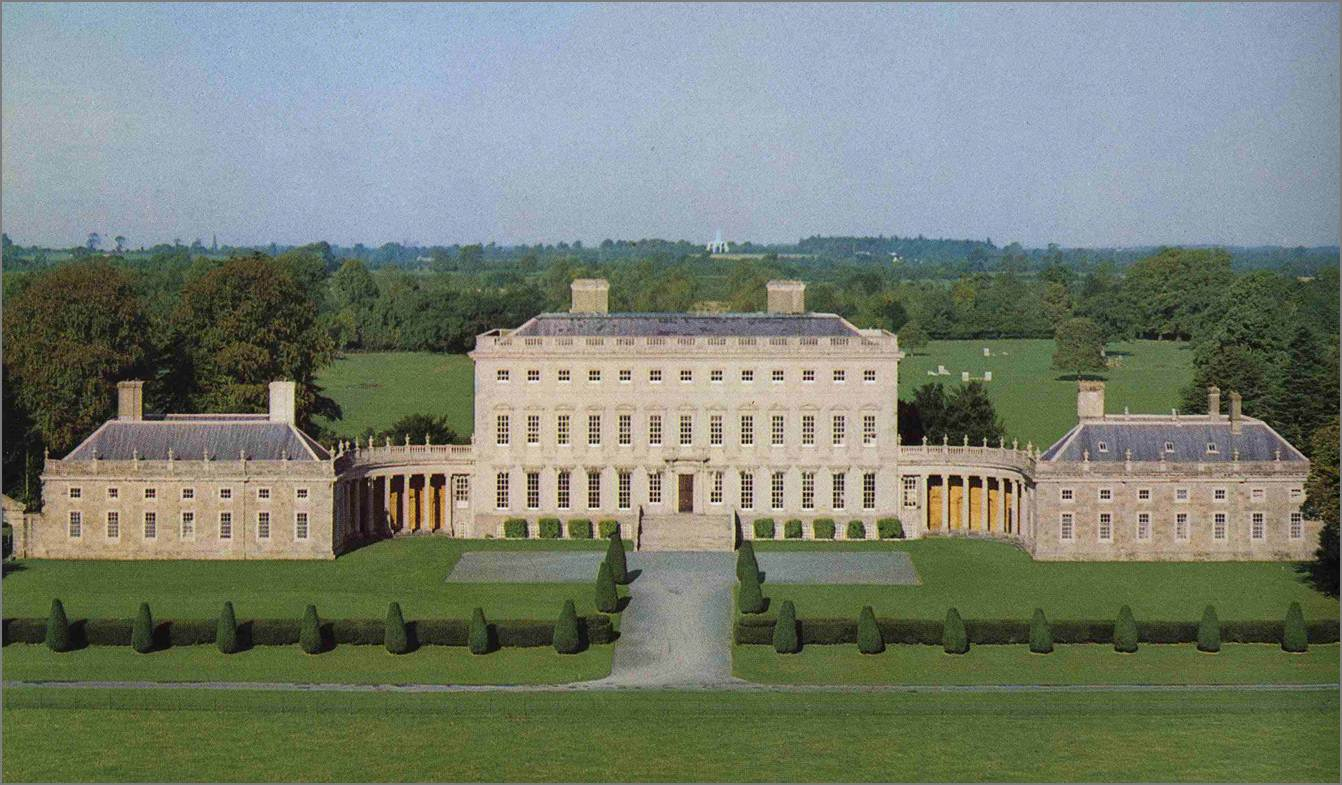
Castletown House, built in 1722 for William Conolly, a prominent member of the Ascendancy

The Protestant Ascendancy (Note: Irish: An Chinsealacht Phrotastúnach; also known as the Ascendancy) was the sociopolitical and economic dominance of largely Catholic Ireland by its Protestant minority. Originating in 17th century anti-Catholic penal laws and land confiscations, the Ascendancy was at its height in the 18th century, before gradually declining in the early 20th.

== Origin of term ==
The phrase was first used by Sir Boyle Roche in a speech to the Irish House of Commons on 20 February 1782. George Ogle MP used it on 6 February 1786 in a debate on falling land values, saying that "When the landed property of the Kingdom, when the Protestant Ascendancy is at stake, I cannot remain silent."

Then on 20 January 1792 Dublin Corporation approved by majority vote a resolution to George III that included this line: "We feel ourselves peculiarly called upon to stand forward in the crisis to pray your majesty to preserve the Protestant ascendancy in Ireland inviolate ...." The corporation's resolution was a part of the debate over Catholic emancipation. In the event, Catholics were allowed to vote again in 1793, but could not sit in parliament until 1829.

The phrase therefore was seen to apply across classes to rural landowners as well as city merchants. The Dublin resolution was disapproved of by a wide range of commentators, such as the Marquess of Abercorn, who called it "silly", and William Drennan who said it was "actuated by the most monopolising spirit".

The phrase became popularised outside Ireland by Edmund Burke, another liberal Protestant, and his ironic comment in 1792: "A word has been lately struck in the mint of the castle of Dublin; thence it was conveyed to the Tholsel, or city-hall, where, having passed the touch of the corporation, so respectably stamped and vouched, it soon became current in parliament, and was carried back by the Speaker of the House of Commons in great pomp as an offering of homage from whence it came. The word is Ascendancy." This was then used by Catholics seeking further political reforms.

In the Irish language, the term used was An Chinsealacht, from cinseal, meaning 'dominance'.

== Penal Laws ==
Flag of the Kingdom of Ireland 1542–1801

The process of Protestant Ascendancy was facilitated and formalized in the legal system after 1691 by the passing of various Penal Laws, which discriminated against the majority Irish Catholic population of the island. While the native Irish Gaels comprised the majority of the Irish Catholic population, long-standing fully Gaelicised and intermarried Norman families (e.g. de Burgo/Burke, FitzGerald/FitzMaurice Dynasty, etc.), having previously held immense power in Ireland, became major targets of the crown and of more stridently anti-Irish members of the Ascendancy. With the defeat of Catholic attempts to regain power and lands in Ireland, a ruling class which became known later as the "Protestant Ascendancy" sought to ensure dominance with the passing of a number of laws to restrict the religious, political and economic activities of Catholics and to some extent, Protestant Dissenters. These aspects provided the political basis for the new laws passed for several decades after 1695. Interdicts faced by Catholics and Dissenters under the Penal Laws were:

- Exclusion of Catholics from most public offices (since 1607), Presbyterians were also barred from public office from 1707.
- Ban on intermarriage with Protestants; repealed 1778
- Presbyterian marriages were not legally recognised by the state
- Catholics barred from holding firearms or serving in the armed forces (rescinded by the Militia Act 1793)
- Bar from membership in either the Parliament of Ireland or the Parliament of England from 1652; rescinded 1662–1691; renewed 1691–1829, applying to the successive parliaments of England (to 1707), Great Britain (1707 to 1800), and the United Kingdom of Great Britain and Ireland (1800 to 1829).
- Disenfranchising Act 1728, exclusion from voting until 1793;
- Exclusion from the legal professions and the judiciary; repealed (respectively) in 1793 and 1829.
- Education Act 1695 – ban on foreign education; repealed 1782.
- Bar to Catholics and Protestant Dissenters entering Trinity College Dublin; repealed 1793.
- On a death by a Catholic, his legatee could benefit by conversion to the Church of Ireland;
- Popery Act – Catholic inheritances of land were to be equally subdivided between all an owner's sons with the exception that if the eldest son and heir converted to Protestantism that he would become the one and only tenant of estate and portions for other children not to exceed one third of the estate. This "Gavelkind" system had previously been abolished by 1600.
- Ban on converting from Protestantism to Roman Catholicism on pain of Praemunire: forfeiting all property estates and legacy to the monarch of the time and remaining in prison at the monarch's pleasure. In addition, forfeiting the monarch's protection. No injury however atrocious could have any action brought against it or any reparation for such.
- Ban on Catholics buying land under a lease of more than 31 years; repealed 1778.
- Ban on custody of orphans being granted to Catholics on pain of a £500 fine that was to be donated to the Blue Coat hospital in Dublin.
- Ban on Catholics inheriting Protestant land
- Prohibition on Catholics owning a horse valued at over £5 (to keep horses suitable for military activity out of the majority's hands)
- Roman Catholic lay priests had to register to preach under the Registration Act 1704, but seminary priests and Bishops were not able to do so until 1778.
- When allowed, new Catholic churches were to be built from wood, not stone, and away from main roads.
- 'No person of the popish religion shall publicly or in private houses teach school, or instruct youth in learning within this realm' upon pain of a £20 fine and three months in prison for every such offence. Repealed in 1782.
- any rewards not paid by the crown for alerting authorities of offences to be levied upon the Catholic populace within the parish and county.

They also covered the non-conforming ("Dissenter") Protestant denominations such as Presbyterians, where they:

- had revolted against the government and
- had not under the 1691 Treaty of Limerick sworn allegiance to William III and Mary II, the head of the Protestant established church in Britain.

However, those protected by the Treaty were still excluded from public political life.

The situation was confused by the policy of the Tory Party in England and Ireland after 1688. They were Protestants who generally supported the Catholic Jacobite claim and came to power briefly in London from 1710 to 1714. Also in 1750, the main Catholic Jacobite heir and claimant to the three thrones, Charles Edward Stuart ("Bonny Prince Charlie"), converted to Anglicanism for a time but had reverted to Roman Catholicism again by his father's death in 1766.

The son of James II, James Francis Edward Stuart (the Old Pretender), was recognised by the Holy See as the legitimate monarch of the Kingdom of England, Kingdom of Scotland and the separate Kingdom of Ireland until his death in January 1766, and Roman Catholics were morally obliged to support him. This provided the main political excuse for the new laws, but it was not entirely exclusive as there was no law against anyone converting to Protestantism. While a relatively small number of Catholics would convert to the Church of Ireland between the 17th and 19th centuries, more often than not these "conversions" amounted to the alteration of paper work, rather than any changes in religious beliefs or practices. With job prospects and civil rights for Irish Catholics having grown quite grim since the mid-17th century, for some, converting to the Anglican Church was one of the few ways one could attempt to improve one's lot in life. A handful of members of formerly powerful Irish clans also chose to convert, learn English, swear fealty to the King, and perform roles on behalf of the Anglo-Irish of The Pale in exchange for lands and other privileges. Records of these conversions were tracked in "Convert Rolls", which can be located through various online resources. Interestingly, early 20th century census records inform us that a fair number of Irish men and women who'd converted to the Anglican Church between the mid 17th and mid 19th century actually returned to their original Catholic faith by the early 20th century. A similar phenomenon can also be observed with the return of "O" and "Mc" to surnames during the mid/late 19th and early 20th centuries, a period known to scholars as the Gaelic Revival (Athbheochan na Gaeilge).

As a result, political, legal and economic power resided with the Ascendancy to the extent that by the mid-18th century, the greater part of the land in Ireland (97% in 1870) was owned by men who rented it out to tenant farmers rather than cultivating it themselves. Smaller landlords in the east, in Ulster or on the outskirts of towns were more favourably placed than the owners of tracts of infertile bog in the west. In 1870 302 proprietors (1.5% of the total) owned 33.7% of the land, and 50% of the country was in the hands of 750 families of the Ascendency. At the other end of the scale, 15,527 (80.5%) owned between them only 19.3% of the land. 95% of the land of Ireland was calculated to be under minority control of those within the established church. Absenteeism is accepted as having been an almost universal practice in Ireland and detrimental to the country's progress.

Reform, though not complete, came in three main stages and was effected over 50 years:

- Reform of religious disabilities in 1778–82, allowing bishops, schools and convents.
- Reform of restrictions on property ownership and voting in 1778–93.
- Restoration of political, professional and office-holding rights in 1793–1829.

=== Grattan's parliament ===
The confidence of the Ascendancy was manifested towards the end of the 18th century by its adoption of a nationalist Irish, though still exclusively Protestant, identity and the formation in the 1770s of Henry Grattan's Patriot Party. The formation of the Irish Volunteers to defend Ireland from French invasion during the American Revolution effectively gave Grattan a military force, and he was able to force Britain to concede a greater amount of self-rule to the Ascendancy.

The parliament repealed most of the Penal Laws in 1771–93 but did not abolish them entirely. Grattan sought Catholic emancipation for the catholic middle classes from the 1780s, but could not persuade a majority of the Irish MPs to support him. After the forced recall of the liberal Lord Fitzwilliam in 1795 by conservatives, parliament was effectively abandoned as a vehicle for change, giving rise to the United Irishmen – liberal elements across religious, ethnic, and class lines who began to plan for armed rebellion. The resulting and largely Protestant-led rebellion was crushed; the Act of Union of 1801 was passed partly in response to a perception that the bloodshed was provoked by the misrule of the Ascendancy, and partly from the expense involved.

== Act of Union and decline ==
St. Patrick's Cross – the Geraldine symbol. It became incorporated into the Union Flag after the 1800 Act of Union merged the formerly separate Kingdom of Ireland into the United Kingdom.

The abolition of the Irish Parliament was followed by economic decline in Ireland, and widespread emigration from among the ruling class to the new centre of power in London, which increased the number of absentee landlords. The reduction of legalised discrimination with the passage of Catholic emancipation in 1829 meant that the Ascendancy now faced competition from prosperous Catholics in parliament and in the higher-level professional ranks such as the judiciary and the army that were needed in the growing British Empire. From 1840 corporations running towns and cities in Ireland became more democratically elected; previously they were dominated until 1793 by guild members who had to be Protestants.

=== Great Irish Famine ===
The festering sense of native grievance was magnified by the Great Famine of 1845–52, with many of the Ascendancy reviled as absentee landlords whose agents were shipping locally-produced food overseas, while much of the population starved, with over a million dying of hunger or associated diseases. Ireland remained a net exporter of food throughout most of the famine. About 20% of the population emigrated. The Incumbered Estates (Ireland) Act 1849 (12 & 13 Vict. c. 77) was passed to allow landlords to sell mortgaged land, where a sale would be restricted because the land was "entailed". Over ten percent of landlords went bankrupt as their tenants could not pay any rent due to the famine. One example was the Browne family which lost over 50,000 acres (200 km^{2}) in County Mayo.

=== Land War ===
As a consequence, the remnants of the Ascendancy were gradually displaced during the 19th and early 20th centuries through impoverishment, bankruptcy, the disestablishment of the Church of Ireland by the Irish Church Act 1869 and finally the Irish Land Acts, which legally allowed the sitting tenants to buy their land. Some typical "Ascendancy" land-owning families like the Marquess of Headfort and the Earl of Granard had by then converted to Catholicism, and a considerable number of Protestant Nationalists had already taken their part in Irish history. The government-sponsored Land Commission then bought up a further 13 million acres (53,000 km^{2}) of farmland between 1885 and 1920 where the freehold was assigned under mortgage to tenant farmers and farm workers.

=== Nationalist movement ===
The Irish Rebellion of 1798 was led in significant part by members of the Anglo-Irish class, some of whom feared the political implications of the impending union with Great Britain. Reformist and nationalist politicians such as Henry Grattan (1746–1820), Wolfe Tone (1763–1798), Robert Emmet (1778–1803), and Sir John Gray (1815–1875) were also Protestant nationalists, and in large measure led and defined Irish nationalism. At the same time the British Government included Anglo-Irish figures at the highest level such as Lord Castlereagh (1769–1828) and George Canning (1770–1827), as well others such as the playwright Richard Brinsley Sheridan (1751–1816). Even during the late 19th and early 20th centuries, when Irish nationalism became increasingly tied to a Roman Catholic identity, it continued to count among its leaders Protestants like Charles Stewart Parnell (1846–1891).

With the Protestant yeoman class void being filled by a newly rising "Catholic Ascendancy", the dozens of remaining Protestant large landowners were left isolated within the Catholic population without the benefit of the legal and social conventions upon which they had depended to maintain power and influence. Local government was democratized by the Local Government (Ireland) Act 1898 (61 & 62 Vict. c. 37), passing many local powers to councilors who were usually supportive of nationalism. Formerly landlords had controlled the grand jury system, where membership was based on being a large ratepayer, and therefore from owning large amounts of land locally. The final phase of the elimination of the Ascendancy occurred during the Anglo-Irish War, when some of the remaining Protestant landlords were either assassinated and/or had their country houses in Ireland burned down. Nearly 300 houses of the old landed class were burned down between 1919 and 1923. The campaign was stepped up by the Anti-Treaty IRA during the subsequent Irish Civil War (1922–23), who targeted some remaining wealthy and influential Protestants who had accepted nominations as Senators in the new Seanad of the Irish Free State.

=== Artistic and cultural role ===
Many members of the Ascendancy played a role in literary and artistic matters in 19th- and 20th-century Ireland, notably Oscar Wilde and Nobel prize-winning author George Bernard Shaw, and Lady Gregory and William Butler Yeats who started the influential Celtic Revival movement, and later authors such as Somerville and Ross, Hubert Butler and Elizabeth Bowen. Ballerina Dame Ninette de Valois, Samuel Beckett (also a Nobel prize-winner) and the artist Sir William Orpen came from the same social background. Chris de Burgh and the rock concert promoter Lord Conyngham (formerly Lord Mount Charles) are more recent high-profile descendants of the Ascendancy in Ireland.

== Sources ==
- Bence-Jones, Mark (1993). Twilight of the Ascendancy. London: Constable. ISBN 0-09-472350-8.
- Claydon, Tony and McBride, Ian (Editors). Protestantism and National Identity: Britain and Ireland, c. 1650-c. 1850 (Cambridge University Press, 1999). ISBN 0-521-62077-5
- Fitzpatrick, David. Descendancy: Irish Protestant Histories Since 1795 (Cambridge University Press, 2014).
- Gillen, Ultán. "Ascendancy Ireland, 1660–1800." The Princeton History of Modern Ireland (2016): 48-73. online
- Hayton, David. "Anglo-Irish Attitudes, Changing Perceptions of National Identity among the Protestant Ascendancy in Ireland, C. 1690–1750." Studies in Eighteenth-Century Culture 17 (1987): 145–157.
- Hill, Jacqueline R. "National Festivals, the State and 'Protestant Ascendancy' in Ireland, 1790–1829." Irish Historical Studies (1984): 30–51. in JSTOR
- Kelly, James. "The politics of Protestant ascendancy, 1730–1790." in James Kelly, ed. The Cambridge History of Ireland 3 (2018): 48-73.
- Kelly, James. "Eighteenth-century Ascendancy: a commentary." Eighteenth-Century Ireland 5.1 (1990): 173-187.
- Lecky, William Edward Hartpole. History of Ireland in the Eighteenth Century (6 vol. 1892)
  - vol 1 1700–1760, online;
  - vol 2, 1760–1789
  - vol 3, 1790–96
  - vol 4, 1796–98
  - vol 5, 1798–1801
  - vol 6, international affairs of 1790s
- McBride, Ian. Eighteenth-Century Ireland: The Isle of Slaves–The Protestant Ascendancy in Ireland (Gill & Macmillan Ltd, 2009) (vol 4 of New Gill History of Ireland) online.
- Moynahan, Julian, Anglo-Irish: The Literary Imagination in a Hyphenated Culture (Princeton: Princeton University Press, 1995, ISBN 978-0691037578)
- Walsh, Patrick. The Making of the Irish Protestant Ascendancy: The Life of William Conolly, 1662–1729 (Boydell & Brewer, 2010)
- Wilson, Rachel, Elite Women in Ascendancy Ireland, 1690–1745: Imitation and Innovation (Boydell and Brewer, Woodbridge, 2015). ISBN 978-1-78327-039-2
