= Penal laws (Ireland) =

18th-century oppressive laws in Ireland

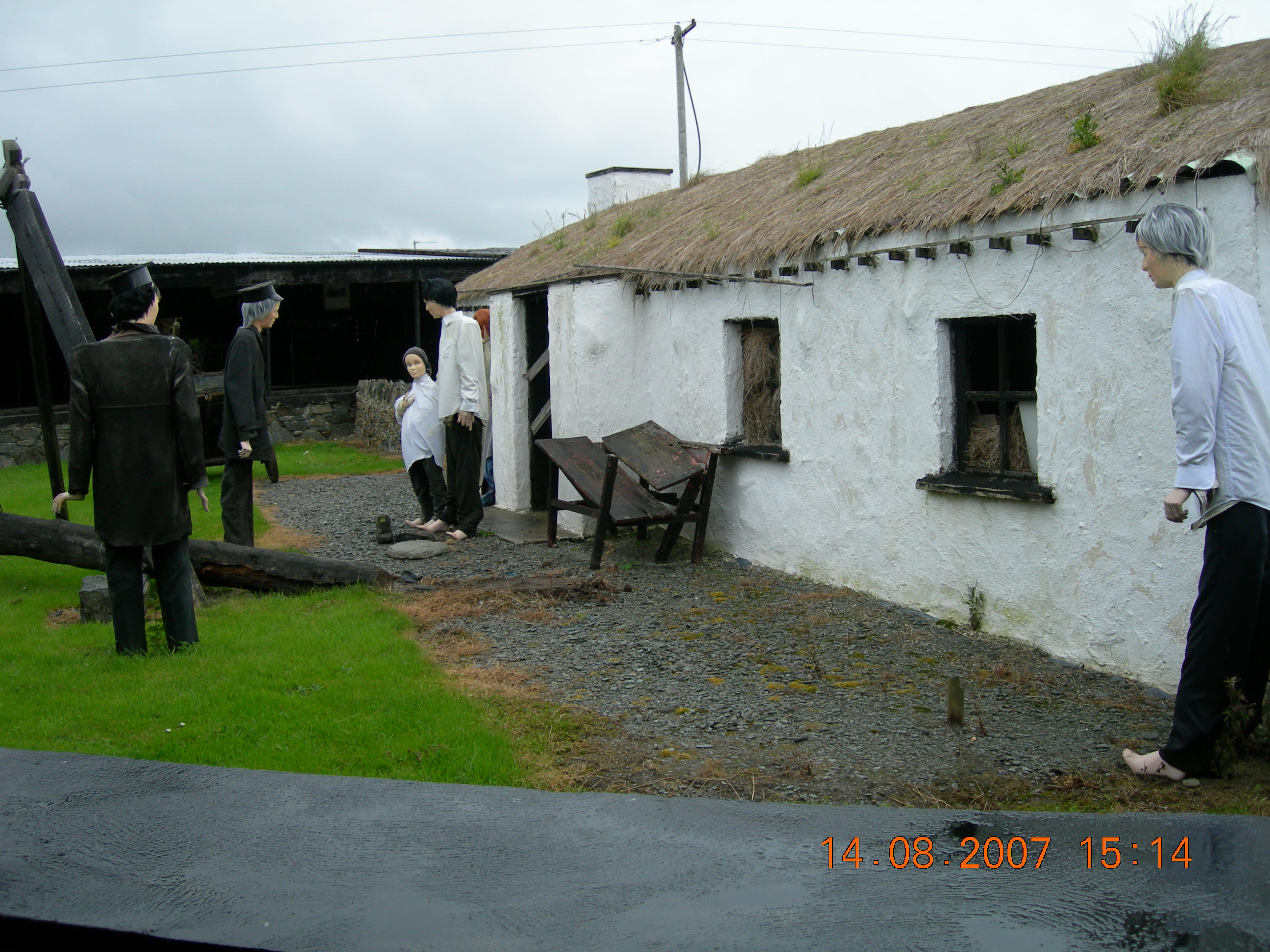
Statues of an Irish eviction scene during penal laws.

In Ireland, the penal laws (Irish: Na Péindlíthe) were a series of legal disabilities imposed in the seventeenth and early eighteenth centuries on the kingdom's Roman Catholic majority and, to a lesser degree, on Protestant "Dissenters". Enacted by the Irish Parliament, they secured the Protestant Ascendancy by further concentrating property and public office in the hands of those who, as communicants of the established Church of Ireland, subscribed to the Oath of Supremacy. The Oath acknowledged the British monarch as the "supreme governor" of matters both spiritual and temporal, and abjured "all foreign jurisdictions [and] powers"—by implication both the Pope in Rome and the Stuart "Pretender" in the court of the King of France.

The laws included the Education Act 1695, the Banishment Act 1697, the Registration Act 1704, the Popery Acts 1704 and 1709, and the Disenfranchising Act 1728. Under pressure from the British government, which in its rivalry with France sought Catholic alliances abroad and Catholic loyalty at home, the laws were repealed through a series of relief acts beginning in 1771. The last significant disability, the requirement that Members of Parliament take the Oath of Supremacy, was removed in 1829, after Ireland had been incorporated by the 1800 Acts of Union into a United Kingdom with Great Britain. The Government of Ireland Act 1920 (coming into force during the Irish War of Independence) contained an all-purpose provision in Section 5 removing any remaining sacramental tests technically still in existence.

== Stuart and Cromwellian rule ==
The penal laws were, according to Edmund Burke, "a machine of wise and elaborate contrivance, as well fitted for the oppression, impoverishment and degradation of a people, and the debasement in them of human nature itself, as ever proceeded from the perverted ingenuity of man." Burke long counselled kinder relations by London with its American and Irish cousins, fearing that the punitive spirit fostered by the British was destroying English character, and would spur violent revolt.

Initially, the dual monarchs of England and Ireland were cautious about applying penal laws to Ireland because they needed the support of the Catholic upper classes to put down the Gaelic Irish rebellion in the Nine Years War (1594–1603). In addition, a significant section of the Catholic aristocracy was composed of Old English, who had traditionally been loyal to English rule in Ireland. However, the ascent of James VI of Scotland to both the English and Irish thrones as James I in 1603 and the eventual victory in the Nine Years War saw a series of coercive new laws put into force. In 1605 the 'Gunpowder Plot' was planned by a group of English Catholics, who were disappointed in their hopes that James would relieve laws against Catholics. This provided a further impetus and justification for restrictive laws on Catholics in Ireland, Scotland and England. In 1607 the Flight of the Earls seeking Catholic help in Europe for a further revolt set the scene for a wholesale Plantation of Ulster by the Lowland Scots and Northern English.

From 1607, Catholics were barred from holding public office or serving in the Irish Army. This meant that the Irish Privy Council and the Lords Justice who, along with the Lord Deputy of Ireland, constituted the government of the country, would in future be Anglicans. In 1613, the constituencies of the Irish House of Commons were altered to give plantation settlers a majority. In addition, Catholics in all three Kingdoms had to pay 'recusant fines' for non-attendance at Anglican services. Catholic churches were transferred to the Anglican Church of Ireland. Catholic services, however, were generally tacitly tolerated as long as they were conducted in private. Catholic priests were also tolerated, but bishops were forced to operate clandestinely. In 1634 the issue of the "Graces" arose; generous taxation for Charles I (whose Queen Henrietta Maria was Catholic) was supported by Irish Catholic landlords on the understanding that the laws would be reformed, but once the tax was passed, Charles' viceroy refused two of the 51 Graces, and subsequent bills were blocked by the Catholic majority in the Irish House of Lords.

Catholic resentment was a factor in starting the Irish Rebellion of 1641 and the establishment of Confederate Ireland from 1642 with Papal support, that was eventually put down in the Cromwellian conquest of Ireland in 1649–53. The Act of Settlement 1652 barred Catholics from membership of Parliament and the major landholders had most of their lands confiscated under the Adventurers' Act 1640. They were also banned from living in towns for a short period. Catholic clergy were expelled from the country and were liable to instant execution when found. Many recusants had to worship in secret at gathering places (such as Mass rocks) in the countryside. In 1666 forty nine Catholics from hiding places in the woods in county Roscommon signed a letter in support of the Pope and protesting the loss of their 'due liberties'. (Note: Another example from 1713 is the elderly Father Connor Reynolds "of Jamestown" in the County Leitrim exiled in Spain since 1681, found hiding in a trunk on a fishing boat arriving at Dungarvan port and imprisoned at Waterford gaol.) Seventeen Catholic martyrs from this period were beatified in 1992.

== 1660–1693 ==
Much of this legislation was rescinded after the Restoration in Ireland by Charles II (1660–1685), under the Declaration of Breda in 1660, in terms of worship and property-owning, but also the first Test Act became law from 1673. Louis XIV of France increased Protestant paranoia in Europe when he expelled the Huguenots from France in 1685, and took his policy from the hard-line Bishop Bossuet. Following the flight from England to Ireland by James II caused by the English Glorious Revolution in 1688, the decisions of the Catholic-majority Patriot Parliament of 1688–9 in Dublin included a complete repeal of the 1660s land settlements. These were reversed after the largely Roman Catholic Jacobites that sided with King James then lost the Williamite war in Ireland in 1689–91. His opponents William III and Mary II were grandchildren of King Charles I, and so the war ultimately decided whether Catholic or Protestant Stuarts would reign.

The war ended with the Treaty of Limerick agreed by Sarsfield and Ginkel in October 1691. This provided in article 1 that:

The Roman Catholics of this kingdom shall enjoy such privileges in the exercise of their religion as are consistent with the laws of Ireland, or as they did enjoy in the reign of king Charles the second: and their majesties, as soon as their affairs will permit them to summon a parliament in this kingdom, will endeavour to procure the said Roman Catholics such farther security in that particular, as may preserve them from any disturbance upon the account of their said religion.

The quid pro quo to attain these privileges involved swearing an oath of loyalty to William and Mary. Many Catholics found this oath repugnant when the Papacy started to support the Jacobites in 1693. A small number of Catholic landlords had sworn this loyalty oath in 1691–3 and their families remained protected. Previous Jacobite garrison surrenders, particularly the agreement at Galway earlier in 1691, specifically provided that the Catholic gentry of counties Galway and Mayo were protected from the property restrictions, though they would be excluded from direct involvement in politics.

Articles 2 and 9 required that:

2. ... provided also, that no person whatsoever shall have or enjoy the benefit of this article, that shall neglect or refuse to take the oath of allegiance, made by act of parliament in England, in the first year of the reign of their present majesties, when thereunto required. 9. The oath to be administered to such Roman Catholics as submit to their majesties' government, shall be the oath abovesaid and no other.

At the European level, this war was a part of the War of the Grand Alliance, in which the Holy See supported William III's alliance against France, and on the news of the Battle of the Boyne a Te Deum was sung in thanksgiving at the Vatican. But from 1693 the Papacy changed its policy and supported James against William, and William's policy also moved from a degree of toleration for Catholics to greater hostility. By then, King James was based in France at Saint Germain, and was supported politically and financially by Louis XIV, the long-standing enemy of William and Mary. Religion eventually became an issue in defining a notable family's loyalty to the crown.

== Ascendancy rule 1691–1778 ==
With the defeat of Catholic attempts to regain power and lands in Ireland, a ruling class which became known later as the Protestant Ascendancy sought to ensure dominance with the passing of a number of laws to restrict the religious, political and economic activities of Catholics and Protestant Dissenters. Harsher laws were introduced for political reasons during the long War of the Spanish Succession that ended in 1714. James Stuart, the son of James II, the "Old Pretender", was recognised by the Holy See as the legitimate King of Great Britain and Ireland until his death in 1766, and Catholics were obliged to support him. He also approved the appointments of all the Irish Catholic hierarchy, who were drawn from his most fervent supporters. These aspects provided the political basis for the new laws passed for several decades after 1695. Interdicts faced by Catholics and Dissenters under the penal laws were:

- Exclusion of Catholics from most public offices (since 1607), Presbyterians were also barred from public office from 1707.
- Ban on the Irish Language being used in court, 1737.
- Ban on intermarriage with Protestants; repealed 1778
- Presbyterian marriages were not legally recognised by the state
- Catholics barred from holding firearms or serving in the armed forces, rescinded by Militia Act 1793.
- Oath of Supremacy required for membership of the Parliament of Ireland from 1652; rescinded 1662–1691; renewed 1691–1829; also applying to the successive parliaments of England, Great Britain, and the United Kingdom of Great Britain and Ireland until the Roman Catholic Relief Act 1829.
- Disenfranchising Act 1728, exclusion from the parliamentary franchise until the Roman Catholic Relief Act 1793;
- Exclusion from the legal professions and the judiciary; repealed (respectively) 1793 and 1829.
- Education Act 1695 – ban on foreign education; repealed 1782.
- Ban to Catholics and Protestant Dissenters entering Trinity College Dublin; repealed 1793.
- On a death by a Catholic, his legatee could benefit by conversion to the Church of Ireland;
- Popery Act – Catholic inheritances of land were to be equally subdivided between all an owner's sons with the exception that if the eldest son and heir converted to Protestantism that he would become the one and only tenant of estate and portions for other children not to exceed one third of the estate. This "Gavelkind" system had previously been abolished by 1600.
- Ban on converting from Protestantism to Roman Catholicism on pain of Praemunire: forfeiting all property estates and legacy to the monarch of the time and remaining in prison at the monarch's pleasure. In addition, forfeiting the monarch's protection. No injury however atrocious could have any action brought against it or any reparation for such.
- Ban on Catholics buying land under a lease of more than 31 years; repealed 1778.
- Ban on custody of orphans being granted to Catholics on pain of a £500 fine that was to be donated to the Blue Coat hospital in Dublin.
- Ban on Catholics inheriting Protestant land.
- Prohibition on Catholics owning a horse valued at over £5 (to keep horses suitable for military activity out of the majority's hands).
- Roman Catholic lay priests had to register to preach under the Registration Act 1704, but seminary priests and Bishops were not able to do so until 1778.
- When allowed, new Catholic churches were to be built from wood, not stone, and away from main roads.
- 'No person of the popish religion shall publicly or in private houses teach school, or instruct youth in learning within this realm' upon pain of a £20 fine and three months in prison for every such offence. Repealed in 1782.
- Any and all rewards not paid by the crown for alerting authorities of offences to be levied upon the Catholic populace within parish and county.

Historians disagree on how rigorously these laws were enforced. The consensus view is that enforcement depended on the attitudes of local magistrates bringing or hearing particular cases; some of whom were rigorous, others more liberal.

As a continuing reminder of their defeat in the Williamite War, the Whig historian Lord Macaulay suggested that the Penal-Law regime helps account for the failure of Irish Roman Catholics to heed the Jacobite call when the Scottish army of the Young Pretender marched on London in 1745. Their submission was the effect of "the habit of daily enduring insult and oppression" and of a "brokenness of heart". The systematic discrimination and exclusion from favour kept their "natural chiefs" abroad.

There were indeed Irish Roman Catholics of great ability, energy and ambition; but they were to be found every where except in Ireland, at Versailles and at Saint Ilfonso, in the armies of Frederic and Maria Theresa. One in exile became a Marshal of France. Another became Prime Minister of Spain. If he had staid [sic] in his native land, he would have been regarded as inferior by all the ignorant and worthless squireens who had signed the Declaration against Transubstantiation.

== Catholic relief 1771–1800 ==
From 1758, before the death of the Old Pretender, who styled himself James III, ad-hoc groups of the remaining Catholic nobility and merchants worked towards repeal of the penal laws and an accommodation within the Hanoverian system. These were based locally on county lines. An earlier attempt in 1727 had met with strong opposition from the Jacobite movement, which resisted any negotiations with the Hanoverians, being usurpers. By 1760 eminent Catholics such as Lord Trimlestown, Lord Kenmare and Charles O'Conor of Belanagare persuaded the more liberal Protestants that they presented no political threat, and that reforms must follow. Events abroad in the 1760s, such as the outcome of the Seven Years' War, the death of the Old Pretender (1766), the emerging "Age of Enlightenment", and the Suppression of the Society of Jesus by Europe's Catholic monarchs, all seemed to confirm their position.

On the death of the Old Pretender in January 1766, the Holy See recognised the Hanoverian dynasty as legitimate, and so the main political basis for the laws was removed and the slow process of Catholic emancipation began, with the repeal of some of the penal laws by the Catholic Relief Acts of 1771, 1778 and 1793. However, the long drawn-out pace of reform ensured that the question of religious discrimination dominated Irish life and was a constant source of division.

Visitors from abroad such as Arthur Young in the late 1770s also deplored the penal laws as being contrary to the spirit of the Age of Enlightenment, and illogical as they were unenforced. In his Tour in Ireland (1780), that was sponsored by many landlords, Young mentioned the laws twice:

.. the cruel laws against the Roman Catholics of this country, remain the marks of illiberal barbarism. Why should not the industrious man have a spur to his industry, whatever be his religion..?

Talking with Chief Baron Foster, Young commented:

In conversation on the Popery laws, I expressed my surprise at their severity; he said they were severe in the letter, but never executed. .. His Lordship did justice to the merits of the Roman Catholics, by observing that they were in general a very sober, honest and industrious people. This .. brought to my mind an admirable expression of Mr Burke's in the English House of Commons: Connivance is the relaxation of slavery, not the definition of Liberty.

=== The Catholic Committee and the Back Lane Parliament ===
In 1773, Kenmare convened a meeting of prominent Catholics in Dublin, representatives of the surviving Catholic gentry and senior bishops. While pleading for penal laws relief, their Catholic Committee foreswore any intention of overturning the Williamite Settlement. They also demonstrated their loyalty by helping to recruit the soldiers in Ireland to fight for the Crown in the American Colonies in the 1770s and, later, by supporting the authorities as they suppressed Whiteboy agrarian protest in the 1780s.

Assisted by Edmund Burke, who in 1764 had drafted a critical commentary on the penal laws that was widely circulated at Westminster, the pro-government policy appeared to pay dividends. The Irish act of Parliament of 1774 allowed any subject of George III "of whatever persuasion to testify their allegiance to him", and the Catholic Relief Act 1778 allowed Catholics, on taking a modified oath that abjured the temporal, but not the spiritual, authority of the Pope, to purchase land and join the army. A further measure followed in 1782: the Irish Parliament, acknowledging the tolerated practice of the Catholic faith, repealed the laws that compelled Catholic bishops to quit the kingdom, and binding those who had assisted at Mass to identify the celebrant. In addition, Catholics might now own a horse worth £5, and, with the consent of their local Protestant bishop, open their own schools. In February 1791 elections to the Committee from the counties and from the five Dublin parishes brought a dramatic change in its composition. The gentry and bishops were now outnumbered by representatives of those Burke described as the "new race of Catholics": the emergent Catholic mercantile and professional middle class. Stirred by news of revolution and reform in France and dissatisfied with the lack of progress since 1782, they demanded an immediate repeal of the remaining penal laws. This caused a split in the Committee with Kenmare leading a withdrawal of the more cautious gentry and bishops.

Under the chairmanship of the Dublin merchant, John Keogh, the Committee signalled a new departure by dismissing Edmund Burke's son, Richard Burke, as assistant secretary and replacing him with Theobald Wolfe Tone, another Protestant but a known democrat. In Dublin Tone was a leading member of the Society of United Irishmen first formed in October 1791 by his Presbyterian ("Dissenter") friends in Belfast, in the midst of the town's enthusiasm for the French Declaration of the Rights of Man and its defence by Thomas Paine.

In the 1792 Irish Parliamentary session, further petitions in favour of a Catholic relief bill, introduced at London's behest to secure Catholic loyalty in the impending confrontation with the new French Republic, were met with contempt. In response the Committee organised a country-wide election, open all male communicants in each parish, to a national convention. The Committee's insistence that it did not intend to "disturb" or "weaken" the establishment in Ireland of the Protestant religion or the security of the Protestant crown, did not reassure the authorities, who saw the hand of the United Irishmen. The Viceroy, Lord Westmorland, called on London for additional troops.

Moved by parallels with the election to the National Constituent Assembly in France, the democratic exercise also caused alarm in the Catholic hierarchy. At the opening the Convention, assembled in the Tailor's Hall in Back Lane, Dublin, in December 1792, Keogh was careful to place two prelates seated on either side of the chairmen. But the petition, as finally approved and signed by the delegates, was presented to the bishops as a fait accompli, with no implication that their sanction was sought or obtained.

=== 1793 Catholic Relief Act ===
Appealing over the heads of the Dublin Parliament and Castle administration, in January 1793 this petition was presented to the King, George III, who, persuaded by his ministers, gave audience to a delegation that included both Keogh and Tone. In April, at London's direction Dublin Castle put its weight behind Henry Grattan in the passage of the Catholic Relief Act. Catholics were admitted to the parliamentary franchise on the same limited and idiosyncratic terms as Protestants. They could take degrees on Trinity College, be called as barristers and serve as army officers and, under the terms of the accompanying Militia Act, most controversially of all, could carry arms.

However, these concessions were "permissive rather than obligatory and a newly awakened Protestant Ascendancy chose as often as not to withhold them". Moreover the retention of the Oath of Supremacy which continued to bar Catholics from parliament, from the judicial bench and from the higher offices of state, when all else was conceded, seemed petty, and was "interpreted by the newly politicised Catholic populace as final proof that the existing government was their natural enemy"

France declared war on Britain and Ireland in February 1793, and while the British government could rely on the revulsion within Catholic hierarchy against the aggressive anti-clericalism of the French Republic, it saw no need to hazard further reform. In February 1795, hopes that the Oath of Supremacy might be amended were dashed when, having declared in favour of admitting Catholics to Parliament, Earl William Fitzwilliam was recalled as Viceroy after just 6 months in post. Some former Committee members and convention delegates were content to focus their efforts elsewhere: in June 1795 they helped secure government the establishment of St. Patrick's seminary in Maynooth. Others, despite the threat of excommunication by their bishops, leaned toward the United Irishmen who, despairing of representative parliamentary reform, now moved to draw the agrarian Catholic Defenders with them toward a French-assisted republican insurrection.

=== 1798 rebellion and the 1800 Act of Union ===
In calling people to arms, the United Irishmen promised complete civil and religious equality, and with this the abolition of the hated system whereby the "landlords' church" (the established Church of Ireland) assessed tithes atop the rack rents of Catholics and Dissenters. Following the suppression of the rebellion in the summer of 1798, British Prime Minister William Pitt and his Chief Secretary for Ireland, Robert Stewart (Lord Castlereagh) moved to incorporate Ireland in a united kingdom with Great Britain. They believed that reduced to minority within a united kingdom, the Catholics could be safely relieved of their remaining disabilities and the country pacified. But they were unable overcome opposition in England, including that of the King, George III. Provision for Catholic emancipation was dropped from the Act of Union that Stewart pushed through a resisting Dublin parliament. A separate Irish executive in Dublin was retained, but representation, still wholly Protestant, was transferred to Westminster constituted as the Parliament of the United Kingdom of Great Britain and Ireland.

It took the Union thirty years to deliver on the promise of completing Catholic emancipation—to admit Catholics to Parliament—and permit an erosion of the Protestant monopoly on position and influence. An opportunity to integrate Catholics through their re-emerging propertied and professional classes as a minority within the United Kingdom may have passed.

== Final emancipation 1808-1829 ==
=== Daniel O'Connell and the Catholic Association ===
In 1808 "friends of emancipation", Henry Grattan among them, proposed that fears of Popery might be allayed if the Crown were accorded the same right exercised by continental monarchs, a veto on the confirmation of Catholic bishops. Yet even when, in 1814, the Curia itself (then in a silent alliance with Britain against Napoleon) proposed that bishops be "personally acceptable to the king", the emergent leader of the popular campaign for emancipation in Ireland, Daniel O'Connell, was unyielding in his opposition. Refusing any instruction from Rome as to "the manner of their emancipation", O'Connell declared that Irish Catholics should be content to "remain for ever without emancipation" rather than allow the king and his ministers "to interfere" with the Pope's appointment of their senior clergy.

For O'Connell any compromising of the independence of the Catholic clergy was potentially fatal to a strategy of campaign, organised from 1823 in the Catholic Association, that relied on the local priest—in most districts of the country, the sole figure, with standing independent of the Protestant landlords and magistrates—to secure the confidence of the people. Typically, it was local priest collected the "Catholic rent" of a penny a month, a rate that opened the Association to the poorest tenants. This enabled O'Connell to mount "monster" rallies (crowds of over 100,000) that stayed the hands of authorities, and emboldened larger enfranchised tenants (the forty-shilling freeholders) to vote for pro-Emancipation candidates in defiance of their landlords.

=== 1829 Catholic Relief Act ===
In 1828, O'Connell defeated a member of the British cabinet in the 1828 County Clare by-election. His triumph, as the first Catholic to be returned in a parliamentary election since 1688, made a clear issue of the Oath of Supremacy—the requirement that MPs acknowledge the King as "Supreme Governor" of the Church and thus forswear the Roman communion. Fearful of the widespread disturbances that might follow from continuing to insist on the letter of the oath, the government finally relented. With the Prime Minister, the Duke of Wellington, invoking the spectre of civil war, the Catholic Relief Act became law in 1829.

Entry to parliament did not come without a price. Bringing the Irish franchise into line with England's, the 1829 Act raised the property threshold for voting in county seats five-fold to ten pounds, disenfranchising the "forty-shilling freeholders" who had risked much in defying their landlords on O'Connell's behalf. The measure reduced the Catholic electorate in Ireland from 216,000 voters to just 37,000.

Perhaps trying to rationalise the sacrifice of his freeholders, O'Connell wrote privately in March 1829 that the new ten-pound franchise might actually "give more power to Catholics by concentrating it in more reliable and less democratically dangerous hands". The Young Irelander John Mitchel believed that this was the intent: to detach propertied Catholics from the increasingly agitated rural masses.

In a pattern that had been intensifying from the 1820s as landlords cleared land to meet the growing livestock demand from England, tenants had been banding together to oppose evictions, and to attack tithe and process servers. Alexis De Tocqueville, in his visit to Ireland in 1835, recorded these Whiteboys and Ribbonmen protesting:

The law does nothing for us. We must save ourselves. We have a little land which we need for ourselves and our families to live on, and they drive us out of it. To whom should we address ourselves?... Emancipation has done nothing for us. Mr. O'Connell and the rich Catholics go to Parliament. We die of starvation just the same.

"Emancipation" did not bring the promised relief from Church of Ireland tithes. Fearful of embarrassing his Whig allies (who in government had brutally suppressed tithe and poor law protests in England), in 1838 O'Connell rejected the call of the Protestant tenant-righter William Sharman Crawford for the complete elimination of the Anglican levy. In its stead, he accepted the Tithe Commutation Act, which offered some reductions and debt forgiveness while incorporating the charge in the rents landlords remained free to set at will. The obligation remained until the disestablishment by the Irish Church Act 1869.

== Government of Ireland Act 1920 ==
Section 5(2) of the Government of Ireland Act 1920 stated:

Any existing enactment by which any penalty, disadvantage, or disability is imposed on account of religious belief or on a member of any religious order as such shall ... cease to have effect in Ireland.

This did not affect the Act of Settlement 1701, which prohibited those married to Catholics from succeeding to the throne; these were later repealed by the Succession to the Crown Act 2013 (between 1920 and 2013 there was no Catholic heir to the throne).

As a result of Sections 5(2) and 37(1) of the 1920 Act, Catholics once again became eligible to occupy the office of Lord Lieutenant of Ireland, the British monarch's representative in Ireland. Within months of the enactment of this legislation, Viscount FitzAlan of Derwent became in April 1921 the first Catholic Lord Lieutenant of Ireland since the penal laws forbade such appointments in 1685. Because of the establishment of the Irish Free State in 1922 and the altered constitutional relationship between Ireland and the United Kingdom, FitzAlan was also the last Lord Lieutenant of Ireland.

== Northern Ireland 2025 ==
In February 2025, the Northern Ireland Office announced that the Secretary of State Hilary Benn had signed a commencement order to repeal the 1737 act which made the use of the Irish language in court a criminal offence.

== Bibliography ==
- Hanley, Gerald (1961). "Nicholas Mahon and 17th Century Roscommon". New England Historic Genealogical Society in Boston. Archived from the original on 18 January 2017.
- Burke, William P (1914). The Irish priests in the penal times (1660–1760) [microform] : from the state papers in H. M. Record Offices, Dublin and London, the Bodleian Library, and the British Museum (PDF). [S.l. : s.n.]
