= Roman Catholic Relief Act 1793 =

Act of the Parliament of Ireland

- Act of Parliament
- Parliament of Ireland
- Long title: An Act for the relief of his majesty's Roman Catholic subjects of Ireland.
- Citation: 33 Geo. 3. c. 21 (I)
- Introduced by: Robert Hobart, Chief Secretary for Ireland
- Territorial extent: Ireland

Dates
- Royal assent: 9 April 1793
- Commencement: 10 January 1793 (Note: Start of session.)
- Repealed: Northern Ireland: 18 December 1953; Republic of Ireland: 16 May 1983

Other legislation
- Amended by: Roman Catholic Relief Act 1829; Statute Law Revision (Ireland) Act 1879
- Repealed by: Northern Ireland: Statute Law Revision Act 1953; Republic of Ireland: Statute Law Revision Act 1983
- Relates to: Popery Act 1704; Disfranchising Act 1727; Roman Catholic Relief Act 1791; Roman Catholic Relief Act 1813; Roman Catholic Relief Act 1829; Roman Catholics Act 1844

Status: Repealed

History of passage through Parliament

Text of statute as originally enacted

The Roman Catholic Relief Act 1793 (33 Geo. 3. c. 21 (I)) was an act of the Parliament of Ireland, implicitly repealing some of the Irish Penal Laws and relieving Roman Catholics of certain political, educational, and economic disabilities.

The act was introduced by the Chief Secretary for Ireland, Robert Hobart, two years after the Roman Catholic Relief Act 1791, an act of the Parliament of Great Britain.

The Irish act included certain local provisions such as allowing Catholics to take degrees at Trinity College Dublin. Catholic schools had already been permitted again by the Catholic Relief Act 1782, subject to the teachers taking the Oath of Allegiance and obtaining a license from the local Church of Ireland bishop.

The 1793 act abolished many of the restrictions of the Popery Act 1704 (2 Anne c. 6 (I)) and replaced others with less onerous ones. The act also repealed the provisions of the Disfranchising Act 1727 (1 Geo. 2. c. 9 (I)), which had prohibited Catholics from voting in elections to the Irish House of Commons. However, it did not remove the terms of the parliamentary oath which prohibited Catholics from sitting in the Parliament of Ireland; section 9 of the 1793 act gave a long list of offices in the Dublin Castle administration for which the existing oaths, anathema to Catholics, remained obligatory.

This was later superseded by the Roman Catholic Relief Act 1829 (10 Geo. 4. c. 7), an act of the Parliament of the United Kingdom of Great Britain and Ireland (the kingdoms having been joined in 1801 by the Acts of Union 1800). Section 12 of the 1829 act had a much shorter list of excluded offices, in particular allowing Catholic MPs.

== Subsequent developments ==
Section 8 of the 1793 act, allowing Catholics to be professors at the Royal College of Physicians of Ireland, was superseded by an 1800 act allowing all Christians. Other restrictions introduced in 1793 were virtually repealed or superseded by the 1829 act. Particular sections were later explicitly repealed as follows:

Sections	Repealed by
12	Marriages by Roman Catholics (Ireland) Act 1833
14	Religious Disabilities Act 1846
6 (in part)	Promissory Oaths Act 1871
7 (in relation to Trinity College Dublin)	University of Dublin Tests Act 1873
1–6, 10, 11, 13	Statute Law Revision (Ireland) Act 1879

The whole act was repealed for Northern Ireland by section 2 of, and the second schedule to, the Statute Law Revision Act 1953 (2 & 3 Eliz. 2. c. 5), which came into force on 18 December 1953.

The whole act was repealed for the Republic of Ireland by section 1 of, and part I of the schedule to, the Statute Law Revision Act 1983, which came into force on 16 May 1983.

== Sources ==
- Bartlett, Thomas (2016). "'So many wheels within wheels': the 1793 Catholic relief Act revisited". In Hayton, David; Holmes, Andrew (eds.). Ourselves Alone? : Religion, Society and Politics in eighteenth- and nineteenth-century Ireland : essays presented to S.J. Connolly. Dublin: Four Courts Press. pp. 126–136. ISBN 978-1-84682-592-7 – via Internet Archive.
- "Bill 2115: For the relief of his majesty's Roman Catholic subjects of Ireland". Irish Legislation Database. Queens University Belfast.
- 33 George III c.21 from The statutes at large, passed in the Parliaments held in Ireland
