= Registration Act =

Act of the Parliament of Ireland

- Act of Parliament
- Parliament of Ireland
- Long title: An Act for registering the Popish Clergy.
- Citation: 2 Anne c. 7 (I)
- Introduced by: Marmaduke Coghill
- Territorial extent: Ireland

Dates
- Royal assent: 4 March 1704
- Commencement: 21 September 1703 (Note: Start of session.)
- Repealed: 13 August 1878

Other legislation
- Amended by: Registration Act 1705; Popery Act 1709; Roman Catholic Relief Act 1782
- Repealed by: Statute Law Revision (Ireland) Act 1878
- Relates to: Popery Act

Status: Repealed

Text of statute as originally enacted

The Registration Act (2 Anne c. 7 (I); long title An Act for registering the Popish Clergy) was an act of the Parliament of Ireland passed in 1704, which required all "Popish" (Roman Catholic) priests to register at their local magistrates' court, to pay two 50-pound bonds to ensure good behaviour, and to stay in the county where they registered.

The act was one of a series of Penal Laws passed after the Williamite War to protect the victorious Protestant Ascendancy from a church seen as loyal to the defeated Jacobites and to foreign powers. Its second section stated that if an Irish Catholic priest was to convert to the established Church of Ireland, he would receive a 20-pound stipend, levied on the residents of the area where he had last practised. Unregistered clergy were to depart Ireland before the 20 July 1704 and any remaining after 24 June 1705 would be deported. Any that returned would be punished as under the Banishment Act 1697 (as high treason). These were sought by freelance "priest hunters".

== Amendment and repeal ==
The Registration Act 1705 (4 Anne c. 2 (I)) amended the Registration Act, Banishment Act and Popery Act, to close a loophole whereby they had not applied to priests ordained after the original act first came into force. The act, originally set to expire after the 1708–09 session of Parliament, was made permanent in that session by section 17 of the Popery Act 1709 (8 Anne c. 3 (I)). The Roman Catholic Relief Act 1782 (21 & 22 Geo. 3. c. 24 (I)) provided that these acts' provisions could not apply to a priest who had registered and taken an oath of allegiance. Daniel O'Connell drafted a comprehensive Catholic Emancipation bill in the 1820s which would have repealed all these acts; in the event the Roman Catholic Relief Act 1829 (10 Geo. 4. c. 7) was more limited and the acts were not formally repealed until the Statute Law Revision (Ireland) Act 1878 (41 & 42 Vict. c. 57).

== Bibliography ==
- "Bill 523: For registering the Popish clergy". Irish Legislation Database. Queens University Belfast.
- Butler, James Goddard; Ball, William (1765). "The Statutes at Large, Passed in the Parliaments Held in Ireland". Dublin: Printed by Boulter Grierson.
  - 2 Ann c.7 pp.31–32 – "An Act for registering the Popish clergy" (1703)
  - 4 Ann c.2 pp.71–72 – "An Act to explain and amend an act, intituled, An Act for registring the popish clergy" (1705)
  - 8 Ann c.3 pp.190–216 – "An Act for explaining and amending an act intituled, An Act to prevent the further growth of popery" (1709)
