= Roman Catholic Relief Act 1813 =

Act of the Parliament of the United Kingdom

- Act of Parliament
- Parliament of the United Kingdom
- Long title: An Act to relieve from the Operation of the Statute of the Twenty fifth Year of the Reign of King Charles the Second, intituled An Act for preventing Dangers which may happen from Popish Recusants, all such of His Majesty's Popish or Roman Catholic Subjects of Ireland as, by virtue of the Act of Parliament of Ireland of the Thirty third Year of His Majesty's Reign, intituled An Act for the Relief of His Majestys Popish or Roman Catholic Subjects of Ireland, hold, exercise or enjoy any Civil or Military Offices or Places of Trust or Profit, or any other Office whatsoever, of which His Majesty's said Subjects are by the said Act of Parliament of Ireland rendered capable.
- Citation: 53 Geo. 3. c. 128
- Territorial extent: United Kingdom

Dates
- Royal assent: 12 July 1813
- Commencement: 12 July 1813 (Note: The Acts of Parliament (Commencement) Act 1793.)
- Repealed: 6 August 1861
Other legislation
Amends	Roman Catholic Relief Act 1793
Repealed by	Statute Law Revision Act 1861
Relates to	Test Act 1673; Roman Catholic Relief Act 1793

Status: Repealed

Text of statute as originally enacted

The Roman Catholic Relief Act 1813 (53 Geo. 3. c. 128) was an act of the Parliament of the United Kingdom. The act allowed Irish Roman Catholics in England to be elected to all corporations; hold all civil and military offices except the very highest; to a certain extent keep arms; and were allowed to vote. This was all provided they took the Oath of Allegiance and a new oath abjuring certain doctrines. This had previously been granted to them in Ireland by the Catholic Relief Act 1793 (33 Geo. 3. c. 44) passed by the pre-Union Parliament of Ireland.

== Subsequent developments ==
The whole act was repealed by section 1 of, and the schedule to, the Statute Law Revision Act 1861 (24 & 25 Vict. c. 101), which came into force on 6 August 1861.
