= List of acts of the Parliament of Ireland, 1701–1710 =

This is a list of acts of the Parliament of Ireland for the years from 1701 to 1710.

The number shown by each act's title is its chapter number. Acts are cited using this number, preceded by the years of the reign during which the relevant parliamentary session was held; thus the act concerning assay passed in 1783 is cited as "23 & 24 Geo. 3. c. 23", meaning the 23rd act passed during the session that started in the 23rd year of the reign of George III and which finished in the 24th year of that reign. Note that the modern convention is to use Arabic numerals in citations (thus "40 Geo. 3" rather than "40 Geo. III"). Acts of the reign of Elizabeth I are formally cited without a regnal numeral in the Republic of Ireland.

Acts passed by the Parliament of Ireland did not have a short title; however, some of these acts have subsequently been given a short title by acts of the Parliament of the United Kingdom, acts of the Parliament of Northern Ireland, or acts of the Oireachtas. This means that some acts have different short titles in the Republic of Ireland and Northern Ireland respectively. Official short titles are indicated by the flags of the respective jurisdictions.

A number of the acts included in this list are still in force in Northern Ireland or the Republic of Ireland. Because these two jurisdictions are entirely separate, the version of an act in force in one may differ from the version in force in the other; similarly, an act may have been repealed in one but not in the other.

A number of acts passed by the Parliament of England or the Parliament of Great Britain also extended to Ireland during this period, most notably the Act of Settlement 1701 and Succession to the Crown Act 1707 which secured the Protestant succession.

== 2 Anne (1703) ==
The 1st session of the 1st parliament of Anne, which met from 21 September 1703 until 4 March 1704.

This session was also traditionally cited as 2 Ann.

=== Public acts ===
Short title, or popular name	Citation	Royal assent
Long title
Additional Excise Act 1703 (repealed)	2 Anne c. 1 (I)	16 October 1703
An Act for an additional duty of excise upon beer, ale, and other liquors. (Repealed by Statute Law Revision (Ireland) Act 1878 (41 & 42 Vict. c. 57))
Importation of Iron and Staves Act 1703 (repealed)	2 Anne c. 2 (I)	16 October 1703
An Act for encouraging the importation of iron and staves. (Repealed by Statute Law Revision (Ireland) Act 1879 (42 & 43 Vict. c. 24))
Popish Priests Act 1703 (repealed)	2 Anne c. 3 (I)	16 October 1703
An Act to prevent Popish Priests from coming into this Kingdom. (Repealed by Statute Law Revision (Ireland) Act 1878 (41 & 42 Vict. c. 57))
Additional Excise Continuance Act 1704 (repealed)	2 Anne c. 4 (I)	4 March 1704
An Act for continuing the additional duty of excise on beer, ale and other liquours. (Repealed by Statute Law Revision (Ireland) Act 1878 (41 & 42 Vict. c. 57))
Treason Act (Ireland) 1703^{(United Kingdom)}	2 Anne c. 5 (I)	4 March 1704
An Act to make it High Treason in this Kingdom to impeach the Succession of the Crown, as limited by several Acts of Parliament. (Repealed for the Republic of Ireland by Statute Law Revision (Pre-Union Irish Statutes) Act 1962 (No. 29))
Popery Act 1703 or the Gavelkind Act 1703 (repealed)	2 Anne c. 6 (I)	4 March 1704
An Act to prevent the further Growth of Popery. (Repealed by Promissory Oaths Act 1871 and Statute Law Revision (Ireland) Act 1878 (41 & 42 Vict. c. 57))
Registration Act 1703 (repealed)	2 Anne c. 7 (I)	4 March 1704
An Act for registering the Popish Clergy. (Repealed by Statute Law Revision (Ireland) Act 1878 (41 & 42 Vict. c. 57))
Plus Lands Act 1703^{(Republic of Ireland)}	2 Anne c. 8 (I)	4 March 1704
An Act for quieting possessions, and disposing of the undisposed and plus acres.
Ecclesiastical Possessions Act 1704 (repealed)	2 Anne c. 9 (I)	4 March 1704
An Act for quieting ecclesiastical persons in their possessions. (Repealed by Statute Law Revision (Ireland) Act 1878 (41 & 42 Vict. c. 57))
Glebe Exchange Act 1704	2 Anne c. 10 (I)	4 March 1704
An Act for the exchange of glebes belonging to churches in this kingdom.
New Parish Churches Act 1704 (repealed)	2 Anne c. 11 (I)	4 March 1704
An Act for building several parish churches in more convenient places. (Repealed by Statute Law Revision (Ireland) Act 1878 (41 & 42 Vict. c. 57))
Benefit of Clergy and Felons Transportation Act 1704 (repealed)	2 Anne c. 12 (I)	4 March 1704
An Act for the reviving an act for taking away the benefit of clergy in some cases; and for transporting felons. (Repealed by Statute Law Revision (Ireland) Act 1878 (41 & 42 Vict. c. 57))
Tories, Robbers, and Rapparees Act 1704 (repealed)	2 Anne c. 13 (I)	4 March 1704
An Act for continuing two acts against tories, robbers, and rapparees. (Repealed by Statute Law Revision (Ireland) Act 1878 (41 & 42 Vict. c. 57))
Protestant Strangers Naturalization Act 1704 (repealed)	2 Anne c. 14 (I)	4 March 1704
An Act for naturalizing of all Protestant strangers in this kingdom. (Repealed by Naturalization Act 1870 (33 & 34 Vict. c. 14))
Sale of Livestock Act 1703^{(Republic of Ireland)}	2 Anne c. 15 (I)	4 March 1704
An Act to prohibit butchers from being graziers, and to redress several abuses in buying and selling of cattle; and in the slaughtering and packing of beef, tallow and hides.
Pawnbrokers Act 1703^{(Republic of Ireland)} (repealed)	2 Anne c. 16 (I)	4 March 1704
An Act for reducing of interest of money to eight per cent for the future. (Repealed by Usury Laws Repeal Act 1854 (17 & 18 Vict. c. 90))
Weights and Measures Act 1704 (repealed)	2 Anne c. 17 (I)	4 March 1704
An Act to supply the defects of an act past in the seventh year of the late King William, intituled, "An act for the better regulating of measures in and throughout this kingdom." (Note: Weights and Measures Act 1695 (7 Will. 3. c. 24 (I))) (Repealed by Statute Law Revision (Ireland) Act 1879 (42 & 43 Vict. c. 24))
Small Debts Recovery Act 1704 (repealed)	2 Anne c. 18 (I)	4 March 1704
An Act for the recovery of small debts. (Repealed by Statute Law Revision (Ireland) Act 1878 (41 & 42 Vict. c. 57))
Dublin Workhouse Act 1703	2 Anne c. 19 (I)	4 March 1704
An Act for erecting a Workhouse in the City of Dublin.

=== Private acts ===
Short title, or popular name	Citation	Royal assent
Long title
Duke of Ormond's Estate Act 1703	2 Anne c. 1 Pr. (I)	4 March 1704
An Act to confirm the sales, fee farms and leases made by James, duke of Ormond, and Charles, earl of Arran, and to enlarge a period for making fee farms until Michaelmas 1705, and to enable the earl of Arran to sell lands to the value of £100 per annum if need be.
Viscount Ross's and Parsons' Relief Act 1703	2 Anne c. 2 Pr. (I)	4 March 1704
An Act for the relief of Richard, Lord Viscount Ross, and Frances Parsons his sister.
Hamilton's Estate Act 1703	2 Anne c. 3 Pr. (I)	4 March 1704
An Act for the sale of part of the estate of Sir Hans Hamilton, baronet, for payment of his grandfather's debts and for other purposes.
Stopford's Estate Act 1703	2 Anne c. 4 Pr. (I)	4 March 1704
An Act for vesting certain lands and hereditaments of James Stopford, esquire, lying in the county of Meath in trustees to be sold for payment of debts and portions and for other purposes.
Poor's and Stephens' Award Confirmation Act 1703	2 Anne c. 5 Pr. (I)	4 March 1704
An Act for the confirming an award made by the honourable the barons of her majesty's court of exchequer, between Mary Poor alias Penefather, Richard, William, and Thomas Poor, and Walter Stephens, esquire, and for securing and settling the several interests as are therein designed and appointed.
Morres' Estate Act 1703	2 Anne c. 6 Pr. (I)	4 March 1704
An Act to prevent the disinheriting of Redmond Morres, esquire.
Coghlan's Relief Act 1703	2 Anne c. 7 Pr. (I)	4 March 1704
An Act to prevent the disinheriting of Captain Garret Coghlan, a Protestant in her majesty's service.
Cork Harbour Act 1703	2 Anne c. 8 Pr. (I)	4 March 1704
An Act for cleansing the channel of the harbour of Cork.
Saint Mary and Saint Paul (Dublin) Churches Act 1703	2 Anne c. 9 Pr. (I)	4 March 1704
An Act to empower the church wardens of St Mary's parish, Dublin, to distrain for money already applotted or hereafter to be applotted for the finishing the parish church of St Mary's, and the same for finishing the parish church of St Paul's.

=== Sources ===
- "The second Year of Anne". Statutes Passed in the Parliaments Held in Ireland. Vol. II: From the Seventeenth and Eighteenth Years of Charles the Second, A.D. 1665, to the Eleventh Year of Anne, A.D. 1712, inclusive. Dublin: George Grierson. 1794. pp. 382–424 – via Google Books.
- "Acts of Parliament by Session: 1703". Irish Legislation Database. Queen's University Belfast.

== 4 Anne (1705) ==
The 2nd session of the 1st parliament of Anne, which met from 10 February 1705 until 16 June 1705.

This session was also traditionally cited as 4 Ann.

=== Public acts ===
Short title, or popular name	Citation	Royal assent
Long title
Additional Duties Act 1705 (repealed)	4 Anne c. 1 (I)	16 June 1705
An act for granting to her Majesty an additional duty on beer, ale, strong waters, tobacco, callicoes, linnens, muslins, and other goods and merchanidzes. (Repealed by Statute Law Revision (Ireland) Act 1878 (41 & 42 Vict. c. 57))
Registration Act 1705 (repealed)	4 Anne c. 2 (I)	16 June 1705
An Act to explain and amend an Act, intituled "An Act for registering the popish clergy." (Note: Registration Act 1703 (2 Anne c. 7 (I)))
Linen Manufacture (Repeal) Act 1705 (repealed)	4 Anne c. 3 (I)	16 June 1705
An Act to repeal an act, intituled, "An Act for the advancement of the trade of linnen manufacture." (Note: Linen Act 1665 (17 & 18 Chas. 2. c. 9 (I))) (Repealed by Statute Law Revision (Ireland) Act 1878 (41 & 42 Vict. c. 57))
Hempen and Flaxen Manufactures Act 1705	4 Anne c. 4 (I)	16 June 1705
An Act for the improvement of the hempen and flaxen manufactures in this kingdom.
Fraudulent Devises Act 1705 (repealed)	4 Anne c. 5 (I)	16 June 1705
An Act for relief of creditors against fraudulent devises. (Repealed by Debts Recovery Act 1830 (11 Geo. 4 & 1 Will. 4. c. 47))
Grand Juries and Highways Act 1705	4 Anne c. 6 (I)	16 June 1705
An Act to prevent the illegal raising of money by grand juries, and the misapplying of money legally raised; and for the better execution of an act (Note: Highways Act 1613 (11, 12 & 13 Jas. 1. c. 7 (I))) for the mending the high ways by six days labour; and for the appointing of overseers of the high ways by the justices at their sessions, in default of naming them by the respective parishes.
Rape Seed Duty Act 1705 (repealed)	4 Anne c. 7 (I)	16 June 1705
An Act for lessening the duty of rape-seed to be exported. (Repealed by Customs Law Repeal Act 1825 (6 Geo. 4. c. 105)
Tolls Act 1705^{(Republic of Ireland)}	4 Anne c. 8 (I)	16 June 1705
An Act to regulate the taking and exacting tolls throughout this kingdom; and to prevent ingrossing coals in the city of Dublin.
Barking of Trees Act 1705	4 Anne c. 9 (I)	16 June 1705
An Act for explaining and putting in execution an act (Note: Timber Act 1698 (10 Will. 3. c. 12 (I))) for planting and preserving timber-trees and woods; and for explaining and putting in execution an act to avoid and prevent divers misdemeanors in idle and lewd persons in barking of trees.
Prevention of Fees Act 1705 (repealed)	4 Anne c. 10 (I)	16 June 1705
An Act to prevent fees being taken in certain cases. (Repealed by Statute Law Revision (Ireland) Act 1878 (41 & 42 Vict. c. 57))
Sale of Horses Act 1705^{(Republic of Ireland)}	4 Anne c. 11 (I)	16 June 1705
An Act against horse-stealing, and to prevent the buying and selling of stolen horses; and for punishing all accessaries to felons.
State Minerals Act 1705^{(Republic of Ireland)} or the Royal Mines Act 1705 or the Royal Mines Act (Ireland) 1705^{(United Kingdom)}	4 Anne c. 12 (I)	16 June 1705
An Act to repeal the statute made in the fifth of Henry the fourth, (Note: Gold and Silver Act 1403 (5 Hen. 4. c. 4 (Eng))) against multiplying gold and silver; and to prevent disputes and controversies concerning royal mines.
Poor Debtors Relief Act 1705 (repealed)	4 Anne c. 13 (I)	16 June 1705
An Act for the relief of poor prisoners for debt. (Repealed by Statute Law Revision (Ireland) Act 1878 (41 & 42 Vict. c. 57))
Weights and Measures Act 1705^{(Republic of Ireland)}	4 Anne c. 14 (I)	16 June 1705
An Act for regulating the weights used in this kingdom; and that salt and meal shall be sold by weight.

=== Private acts ===
Short title, or popular name	Citation	Royal assent
Long title
Lord Shelburne's Estate Act 1705	4 Anne c. 1 Pr. (I)	16 June 1705
An Act to confirm and make good a sale made by Henry, lord baron of Shelburne, of certain woods in the county of Kerry.
Aylmer's Estate Act 1705	4 Anne c. 2 Pr. (I)	16 June 1705
An Act to enable certain persons to sell certain parts of the estate of Sir Justin Aylmer, baronet, for payment of debts and to empower a certain other person to make leases of other parts of the said estate.
Hackett's Estate Act 1705	4 Anne c. 3 Pr. (I)	16 June 1705
An Act for vesting the estate of Sir Thomas Hackett, knight, in trustees, and for empowering them to sell the same for payment of his debts, if the value thereof amount to so much.
Magill's Estate Act 1705	4 Anne c. 4 Pr. (I)	16 June 1705
An Act for sale of part of the estate of John Magill of Gill Hall in the county of Down, esquire, and for settling an equivalent in other parts of his estate in lieu thereof.
Coghlan's Estate Act 1705	4 Anne c. 5 Pr. (I)	16 June 1705
An Act for the relief of Captain James Coghlan and Felix Coghlan, the surviving Protestant sons of John Coghlan of Cloghan.
Browne's Estate Act 1705	4 Anne c. 6 Pr. (I)	16 June 1705
An Act for the sale of Colonel John Browne's estate for payment of his Protestant creditors.
Dawson's Estate Act 1705	4 Anne c. 7 Pr. (I)	16 June 1705
An Act to enable Thomas Dawson of Castle Dawson in the county of Londonderry, esquire, to make sale of several lands for payment of debts, and for settling an equivalent or other lands for Olivia Dawson, his wife and Arabella Dawson, late wife of Thomas Dawson the younger, deceased, for their several jointures, and for provision for Joshua Dawson and Arabella Dawson, infants, children of Thomas Dawson, deceased.
Morres' Estate Act 1705	4 Anne c. 8 Pr. (I)	16 June 1705
An Act to enable John Morres, esquire, an infant, son and heir of Redmond Morres, deceased, to make a jointure on any woman he shall marry, and for relief of the younger children of the said Redmond, and for amending and explaining some clauses in an act entitled an act to prevent the disinheriting of Redmond Morres.

=== Sources ===
- "The fourth Year of Anne". Statutes Passed in the Parliaments Held in Ireland. Vol. II: From the Seventeenth and Eighteenth Years of Charles the Second, A.D. 1665, to the Eleventh Year of Anne, A.D. 1712, inclusive. Dublin: George Grierson. 1794. pp. 425–449 – via Google Books.
- "Acts of Parliament by Session: 1705". Irish Legislation Database. Queen's University Belfast.
- "Pre-Union Irish Statutes: 1705 Acts". Irish Statute Book. Attorney General of Ireland.

== 6 Anne (1707) ==
The 3rd session of the 1st parliament of Anne, which met from 1 July 1707 until 30 October 1707.

This session was also traditionally cited as 6 Ann.

=== Public acts ===
Short title, or popular name	Citation	Royal assent
Long title
Import Duties Act 1707 (repealed)	6 Anne c. 1 (I)	24 October 1707
An Act for granting to her Majesty an additional duty on beer, ale, strong waters, tobacco, callicoes, linens, muslins, and other goods and merchandizes. (Repealed by Statute Law Revision (Ireland) Act 1878 (41 & 42 Vict. c. 57))
Registration of Deeds Act 1707^{(Republic of Ireland)}	6 Anne c. 2 (I)	24 October 1707
An Act for the publick registring of all deeds, conveyances and wills that shall be made of any honors, manors, lands, tenements, or hereditaments.
Partition Act 1707 (repealed)	6 Anne c. 3 (I)	24 October 1707
An Act for continuing an act made in the ninth year of the reign of the late King William, intituled, "An Act for the more easie obtaining partitions of lands in coparcenary, joint-tenancy, and tenancy in common, and bounding and mearing of lands." (Note: Partition Act (Ireland) 1697 (9 Will. 3. c. 12 (I))) (Repealed by Statute Law Revision (Ireland) Act 1878 (41 & 42 Vict. c. 57))
Concealment of Birth of Bastards Act 1707	6 Anne c. 4 (I)	24 October 1707
Act to prevent the destroying and murthering of Bastard Children.
Small Debts Recovery Act 1707 (repealed)	6 Anne c. 5 (I)	24 October 1707
An Act for the amending and continuing an act made in the second year of the reign of her most excellent Majesty, intituled, "An Act for the recovery of small debts in a summary way before the judges of assize." (Note: Small Debts Recovery Act 1704 (2 Anne c. 18 (I))) (Repealed by Statute Law Revision (Ireland) Act 1878 (41 & 42 Vict. c. 57))
Papists Act 1707 (repealed)	6 Anne c. 6 (I)	24 October 1707
An Act to explain and amend an Act, intituled, "An Act to prevent Papists being Solicitors." (Note: Papists Act 1698 (10 Will. 3. c. 13 (I))) (Repealed by Statute Law Revision (Ireland) Act 1878 (41 & 42 Vict. c. 57))
Sheriffs Act 1707^{(Republic of Ireland)}	6 Anne c. 7 (I)	24 October 1707
An Act for lessening sheriffs fees on execution.
Privilege of Parliament Act 1707	6 Anne c. 8 (I)	24 October 1707
An Act for explaining and limiting the Privileges of Parliament. (Repealed for the Republic of Ireland by Statute Law Revision (Pre-Union Irish Statutes) Act 1962 (No. 29))
Hempen and Flaxen Manufacture Act 1707	6 Anne c. 9 (I)	30 October 1707
An Act for the encouragement and improvement of the hempen and flaxen manufacture.
Administration of Justice Act 1707^{(Republic of Ireland)}	6 Anne c. 10 (I)	30 October 1707
An Act for the amendment of the law, and the better advancement of justice.
Tories, Robbers, and Rapparees Act 1707	6 Anne c. 11 (I)	30 October 1707
An Act for explaining and amending two several acts against tories, robbers, and rapparees.
Expiring Statutes Continuance and Butter Casks Act 1707	6 Anne c. 12 (I)	30 October 1707
An Act for the continuing and perpetuating of divers laws and statutes heretofore temporary, and for amending of the law in relation to butter casks.
Servants Wages and Disorderly Servants Act 1707 (repealed)	6 Anne c. 13 (I)	30 October 1707
An Act to impower justices of the peace to determine disputes about servants wages; and to oblige masters to pay the same; and to punish idle and disorderly servants. (Repealed by Statute Law Revision (Ireland) Act 1878 (41 & 42 Vict. c. 57))
Marching Soldiers Act 1707 (repealed)	6 Anne c. 14 (I)	30 October 1707
An Act to prevent the Disorders that may happen by the marching of Soldiers, and for providing Carriages for the Baggage of Soldiers in their march. (Repealed for the United Kingdom by Statute Law Revision Act 1964 (c. 79) and for the Republic of Ireland by Statute Law Revision (Pre-Union Irish Statutes) Act 1962 (No. 29))
Outlawry Act 1707 (repealed)	6 Anne c. 15 (I)	30 October 1707
An Act to supply the defects, and for the better execution of an act, entituled, "An Act for the avoiding of privy and secret outlawries of his Majesty's subjects in personal actions." (Note: Outlawry Act 1613 (11, 12 & 13 Jas. 1. c. 8 (I))) (Repealed for the Republic of Ireland by Statute Law Revision (Pre-Union Irish Statutes) Act 1962 (No. 29) and for Northern Ireland by the Statute Law Revision Act 1950 (14 Geo. 6. c. 6))
Abductions Act 1707 (repealed)	6 Anne c. 16 (I)	30 October 1707
An Act for the more effectual preventing the taking away and marrying children against the wills of their parents or guardians. (Repealed by Offences Against the Person (Ireland) Act 1829 (10 Geo. 4. c. 34))
Lotteries and Gaming-Tables Act 1707	6 Anne c. 17 (I)	30 October 1707
An Act for supressing lotteries and gaming-tables.
Exportation of Corn Act 1707 (repealed)	6 Anne c. 18 (I)	30 October 1707
An Act for encouraging the exportation of corn. (Repealed by Statute Law Revision (Ireland) Act 1878 (41 & 42 Vict. c. 57))
Marsh's Library Act 1707^{(Republic of Ireland)}	6 Anne c. 19 (I)	30 October 1707
An Act for settling and preserving a public library forever in the house for that purpose built by His Grace Narcissus, now lord archbishop of Armagh, on part of the ground belonging to the archbishop of Dublin's palace near to the city of Dublin.
Dublin Port and Ballast Office Act 1707 (repealed)	6 Anne c. 20 (I)	24 October 1707
An Act for cleansing the port, harbour, and river of Dublin, and for erecting a ballast-office in the said city. (Repealed by Dublin Port Act 1786 (26 Geo. 3. c. 19 (I)))
St Anne's Parish Act 1707^{(Republic of Ireland)}	6 Anne c. 21 (I)	30 October 1707
An Act for dividing the several Parishes of Saint Andrew's, Saint Nicholas without the Walls, and the united Parishes of Saint. Katherine's, Saint James, and Saint John's of Kilmainham, and for making or erecting a new Parish, by the Name of the Parish of Saint Anne, on the Ground lying between Grafton-street and Merrion-street, all situate, lying, and being in or neere the Suburbs, of the City of Dublin.

=== Private acts ===
Short title, or popular name	Citation	Royal assent
Long title
Lady Clanmalier's Estate Act 1707	6 Anne c. 1 Pr. (I)	24 October 1707
An Act for settling the estate of Anne, Lady Viscountess Dowager of Clanmalier, on Richard, Lord Bellew, baron of Duleek, and for raising £3,000 thereout, for the portion of Mary Nugent, niece of the said Lady Clanmalier, and wife of Francis Bermingham, eldest son of Edward, lord baron of Athenree.
Duke of Ormond's Estate Act 1707	6 Anne c. 2 Pr. (I)	30 October 1707
An Act to enlarge the time for executing several powers and authorities given to James, duke of Ormond, and Charles Weston, earl of Arran, by several former acts of parliament, and for making effectual and confirming the bargains, sales, fee-farms and leases made by the said duke and earl.
Lord Doneraile's Estate Act 1707	6 Anne c. 3 Pr. (I)	30 October 1707
An Act to enable the Right Honourable Arthur, Lord Viscount Doneraile, to make leases of his estate, and to sell part thereof, and with the money arising thereby to purchase other lands to the same uses.
	6 Anne c. 4 Pr. (I)	
(Unknown)
Saint Mary and Saint Nicholas (Dublin) Churches Act 1707	6 Anne c. 5 Pr. (I)	30 October 1707
An Act for the raising money for the finishing the parish church of St Mary, and also for rebuilding and finishing the parish church of St Nicholas within the walls, both in the city of Dublin.
Dillon's Estate Act 1707	6 Anne c. 6 Pr. (I)	30 October 1707
An Act for vesting a certain part of the estate of Sir John Dillon, in trustees, to be sold for payment of his debts, and limiting other lands in lieu thereof to the same uses.
Hackett's Estate Act 1707	6 Anne c. 7 Pr. (I)	30 October 1707
An Act for explaining and amending an act, intituled "An Act for vesting the estate of Sir Thomas Hackett, knight, in trustees, and for empowering them to sell the same for payment of his debts, if the value thereof amount to so much." (Note: Hackett's Estate Act 1705 (4 Anne c. 3 Pr. (I)))
Cusack's and Nugent's Relief Act 1707	6 Anne c. 8 Pr. (I)	30 October 1707
An Act for the relief of Patrick Cusack and Augustin Nugent, gentlemen.

=== Sources ===
- "The sixth Year of Anne". Statutes Passed in the Parliaments Held in Ireland. Vol. II: From the Seventeenth and Eighteenth Years of Charles the Second, A.D. 1665, to the Eleventh Year of Anne, A.D. 1712, inclusive. Dublin: George Grierson. 1794. pp. 449–520 – via Google Books.
- "Acts of Parliament by Session: 1707". Irish Legislation Database. Queen's University Belfast.
- "Pre-Union Irish Statutes: 1707 Acts". Irish Statute Book. Attorney General of Ireland.

== 8 Anne (1709) ==
The 4th session of the 1st parliament of Anne, which met from 5 May 1709 until 30 August 1709.

This session was also traditionally cited as 8 Ann.

=== Public acts ===
Short title, or popular name	Citation	Royal assent
Long title
Payment of Duties (Security) Act 1709 (repealed)	8 Anne c. 1 (I)	23 June 1709
An Act for the better securing to her Majesty of the payment of such duties as shall be granted to her Majesty this session of Parliament. (Repealed by Statute Law Revision (Ireland) Act 1878 (41 & 42 Vict. c. 57))
Import Duties and Rock-Salt Act 1709 (repealed)	8 Anne c. 2 (I)	30 August 1709
An Act for granting to her Majesty an additional duty on beer, ale, strong-waters, tobacco, callicoes, linnens, and other goods and merchandizes; and also a duty on rock-salt. (Repealed by Statute Law Revision (Ireland) Act 1878 (41 & 42 Vict. c. 57))
Popery Act 1709 (repealed)	8 Anne c. 3 (I)	30 August 1709
An Act for explaining and amending an Act intituled, "An Act to prevent the further Growth of Popery." (Note: Popery Act 1703 (2 Anne c. 6 (I))) (Repealed by Promissory Oaths Act 1871 (34 & 35 Vict. c. 48))
Posthumous Children Act 1709	8 Anne c. 4 (I)	30 August 1709
An Act to enable posthumous children to take estates, as if born in their father's life-time.
Assizes and Sessions Delays Act 1709 (repealed)	8 Anne c. 5 (I)	30 August 1709
An Act to prevent Delays of Proceedings at the Assizes and Sessions. (Repealed for the Republic of Ireland by Statute Law Revision (Pre-Union Irish Statutes) Act 1962 (No. 29) and for Northern Ireland by the Statute Law Revision Act 1950 (14 Geo. 6. c. 6))
Counterfeiting Coin Act 1709 (repealed)	8 Anne c. 6 (I)	30 August 1709
An Act for the better preventing the counterfeiting the current coin of this kingdom. (Repealed by Coinage Offences Act 1832 (2 & 3 Will. 4. c. 34))
Marshalsea Prison Escapes Act 1709 (repealed)	8 Anne c. 7 (I)	30 August 1709
An Act for the better preventing escapes out of the prison of the Marshalsea of the Four courts. (Repealed by Statute Law Revision (Ireland) Act 1878 (41 & 42 Vict. c. 57))
House-breakers Discovery Act 1709 (repealed)	8 Anne c. 8 (I)	30 August 1709
An Act for encouraging the discovery and apprehending of house-breakers. (Repealed by Statute Law Revision (Ireland) Act 1879 (42 & 43 Vict. c. 24))
Delivering Declarations to Prisoners Act 1709	8 Anne c. 9 (I)	30 August 1709
An Act for delivering declarations to prisoners.
Registration of Deeds Act 1709^{(Republic of Ireland)} (repealed)	8 Anne c. 10 (I)	30 August 1709
An Act for amending an act, intituled, "An Act for the publick registring of all deeds, conveyances, and wills, that shall be made of any honors, manors, lands, tenements, or hereditaments." (Note: Registration of Deeds Act 1707 (6 Anne c. 2 (I))) (Repealed by Bills of Exchange (Ireland) Act 1828 (9 Geo. 4. c. 24))
Inland Bills of Exchange and Promissory Notes Act 1709	8 Anne c. 11 (I)	30 August 1709
An Act for the better payment of inland bills of exchange, and for making promissary notes more obligatory.
Hempen and Flaxen Manufactures Amendment Act 1709	8 Anne c. 12 (I)	30 August 1709
An Act to amend the defects of such acts as have been made relating to the hempen and flaxen manufactures, and to encourage the further improvement thereof.
Tynan and Derrynoose Parishes Act 1709	8 Anne c. 13 (I)	30 August 1709
An Act for dissolving the union of the parishes of Tynan and Derrynoose, and for building several parish-churches in more convenient places in the diocese of Armagh.

=== Private acts ===
Short title, or popular name	Citation	Royal assent
Long title
Earl of Ranelagh's Estate Act 1709	8 Anne c. 1 Pr. (I)	30 August 1709
An Act to vest part of the estate of Richard, earl of Ranelagh, in William Westgarth, esquire, to be sold for payment of the debts of the said earl.
Lord Bellew's Estate Act 1709	8 Anne c. 2 Pr. (I)	30 August 1709
An Act for enabling Richard, Lord Bellew, baron of Duleek, to sell part of his estate for discharge of debts and encumbrances affecting the same, and for settling the residue thereof on himself for life, with remainder to his Protestant issue, subject to an enlargement of the jointure already settled on the right honourable the countess of Newburgh his wife.
Blundell's Estate Act 1709	8 Anne c. 3 Pr. (I)	30 August 1709
An Act to enable Sir Montague Blundell, baronet, a minor, to make a settlement of his estate on his marriage, notwithstanding his infancy.
Vesey's Estate Act 1709	8 Anne c. 4 Pr. (I)	30 August 1709
An Act for enabling Agmondisham Vesey, esquire, to charge his estate for payment of debts.
Plunkett's Relief Act 1709	8 Anne c. 5 Pr. (I)	30 August 1709
An Act for the relief of Charles Plunkett, esquire.
Rawdon's Relief Act 1709	8 Anne c. 6 Pr. (I)	30 August 1709
An Act for the relief of Dorothy Rawdon, spinster.

=== Sources ===
- "The eighth Year of Anne". Statutes Passed in the Parliaments Held in Ireland. Vol. II: From the Seventeenth and Eighteenth Years of Charles the Second, A.D. 1665, to the Eleventh Year of Anne, A.D. 1712, inclusive. Dublin: George Grierson. 1794. pp. 520–575 – via Google Books.
- "Acts of Parliament by Session: 1709". Irish Legislation Database. Queen's University Belfast.

== 9 Anne (1710) ==
The 5th session of the 1st parliament of Anne, which met from 19 May 1710 until 28 August 1710.

This session was also traditionally cited as 9 Ann.

=== Public acts ===
Short title, or popular name	Citation	Royal assent
Long title
Payment of Duties (Security) Act 1710 (repealed)	9 Anne c. 1 (I)	20 June 1710
An Act for better securing to her Majesty the payment of such duties as shall be granted to her Majesty in this session of Parliament. (Repealed by Statute Law Revision (Ireland) Act 1878 (41 & 42 Vict. c. 57))
Import Duties Act 1710 (repealed)	9 Anne c. 2 (I)	28 August 1710
An Act for granting to her Majesty an additional duty on beer, ale, strong-waters, tobacco, and other goods and merchandizes. (Repealed by Statute Law Revision (Ireland) Act 1878 (41 & 42 Vict. c. 57))
Linen Manufacture Regulation Act 1710	9 Anne c. 3 (I)	28 August 1710
An Act to enforce such acts as have been made for the improvement of the linnen-manufacture, and for a further regulation of the same.
Appeals in Murder Cases Act 1710	9 Anne c. 4 (I)	28 August 1710
An Act for bringing an appeal in case of murder, notwithstanding the statute of the tenth of King Henry the seventh, (Note: Murder Act (Ireland) 1495 (10 Hen. 7. c. 21 (I))) whereby murder is made high treason.
Timber Act 1710	9 Anne c. 5 (I)	28 August 1710
An Act for the further explaining and putting in execution "An Act for planting and preserving timber trees and woods." (Note: Timber Act 1698 (10 Will. 3. c. 12 (I)))
Criminal Evidence Act 1710^{(Republic of Ireland)}	9 Anne c. 6 (I)	28 August 1710
An Act for taking away the benefit of clergy in certain cases; and for taking away the book in all cases; and for repealing part of the statute for transporting felons.
Butchers and Graziers Act 1710	9 Anne c. 7 (I)	28 August 1710
An Act for amending and making perpetual an act, intituled, "An Act to prohibit butchers from being graziers, and to redress several abuses in buying and selling of cattle, and in the slaughtering and packing of beef, tallow, and hides." (Note: Sale of Livestock Act 1703 (2 Anne c. 15 (I)))
Rents and Tenants Frauds Act 1710	9 Anne c. 8 (I)	28 August 1710
An Act for the better securing of rents and to prevent frauds committed by tenants.
Highways and Roads Amendment Act 1710	9 Anne c. 9 (I)	28 August 1710
An Act for the amending of the high ways and roads in this kingdom, and for the application of the six days labour.
Relief of Insolvent Debtors Act 1710 (repealed)	9 Anne c. 10 (I)	28 August 1710
An Act for the relief of insolvent debtors not in confinement. (Repealed by Statute Law Revision (Ireland) Act 1878 (41 & 42 Vict. c. 57))
Maiming of Cattle Act 1710 (repealed)	9 Anne c. 11 (I)	28 August 1710
An Act to prevent the maiming of cattle. (Repealed by Statute Law Revision (Ireland) Act 1878 (41 & 42 Vict. c. 57))
Uniting of Parishes Act 1710^{(Republic of Ireland)}	9 Anne c. 12 (I)	28 August 1710
An Act for uniting several parishes, and building several parish-churches in more convenient places.

=== Private acts ===
Short title, or popular name	Citation	Royal assent
Long title
Duke of Ormond's Estate Act 1710	9 Anne c. 1 Pr. (I)	28 August 1710
An Act for the rendering more effectual the several provisions made by the former acts for payment of the debts of James, late duke of Ormond, and of the present duke of Ormond, and for other purposes therein expressed.
Viscount Grandison's Estate Act 1710	9 Anne c. 2 Pr. (I)	28 August 1710
An Act for vesting part of the estate of the Lord Viscount Grandison in the kingdom of Ireland in trustees, to be sold for payment of a debt charged thereon.
Countess of Newburgh's Estate Act 1710	9 Anne c. 3 Pr. (I)	28 August 1710
An Act for confirming to the Right Honourable Frances, countess of Newburgh, (Note: Lady Frances Brudenell.) wife of Richard Lord Bellew, (Note: Richard Bellew, 3rd Baron Bellew of Duleek.) the provisions formerly made for the jointure of the said countess, and confirming certain estates and uses limited by a certain indenture herein mentioned, and for providing portions for the younger daughters of the said Richard Lord Bellew and the countess of Newburgh.
Nugent's Relief Act 1710	9 Anne c. 4 Pr. (I)	28 August 1710
An Act for the relief of Susanna Catharina Nugent.
Raymond's Estate Act 1710	9 Anne c. 5 Pr. (I)	28 August 1710
An Act for the enabling Samuel Raymond of Ballyloughrane in the county of Kerry, esquire, to mortgage or sell certain lands in the said county of Kerry and County Cork, for the payment of his debts.
Stoughton's Estate Act 1710	9 Anne c. 6 Pr. (I)	28 August 1710
An Act for the enabling Henry Stoughton of Rattow in the county of Kerry, esquire, and Sarah, his wife, in behalf of themselves and Anthony Stoughton, son and heir of the said Henry, an infant, to mortgage certain lands and tenements in the county of Kerry for the payment of debts.

=== Sources ===
- "The ninth Year of Anne". Statutes Passed in the Parliaments Held in Ireland. Vol. II: From the Seventeenth and Eighteenth Years of Charles the Second, A.D. 1665, to the Eleventh Year of Anne, A.D. 1712, inclusive. Dublin: George Grierson. 1794. pp. 575–594 – via Google Books.
- "Acts of Parliament by Session: 1710". Irish Legislation Database. Queen's University Belfast.

== See also ==
- List of acts of the Parliament of Ireland
- List of acts of the Oireachtas
- List of legislation in the United Kingdom
