= Disabilities (Catholics) =

Legal restrictions on Catholics in England (1534–1829)

Disabilities were legal restrictions and limitations placed on the Catholics of England since the issuance of the Act of Supremacy in 1534. These disabilities were first sanctioned by the Penal Laws, enacted under the reigns of Henry VIII and Elizabeth I. They were followed by the Clarendon Code (1661–65) and the Test Act (1673).

In spite of the promulgation of the Toleration Act (1689), which removed many civil disabilities, the Catholics still had to face limitations in respect of property rights, succession rights and education. Catholics also still had no right to assemble and pray. The oath of abjuration required, swearing against the legitimacy of the Jacobite succession, was also counted as a disability, and remained in place until 1829.

== See also ==
- Catholic emancipation
