= Banishment Act 1697 =

Act of the Parliament of Ireland

- Act of Parliament
- Parliament of Ireland
- Long title: An Act for banishing all Papists exercising any Ecclesiastical Jurisdiction, and all Regulars of the Popish Clergy out of this Kingdom.
- Citation: 9 Will. 3. c. 1 (I)
- Introduced by: Murrough Boyle, 1st Viscount Blesington (Lords)
- Territorial extent: Ireland

Dates
- Royal assent: 25 September 1697
- Commencement: 27 July 1697 (Note: Start of session.)
- Repealed: 13 August 1878

Other legislation
- Amended by: Roman Catholic Relief Act 1782
- Repealed by: Statute Law Revision (Ireland) Act 1878

Status: Repealed

Text of statute as originally enacted

The Banishment Act 1697 or Bishops' Banishment Act 1697 (9 Will. 3. c. 1 (I)) was a 1697 act of the Parliament of Ireland which banished all ordinaries and regular clergy of the Roman Catholic Church from Ireland. By 1 May 1698 all "popish archbishops, bishops, vicars general, deans, Jesuits, monks, friars, and other regular popish clergy" had to be in one of several named ports awaiting a ship out of the country. Remaining or entering the country after this date would be punished as a first offence with 12 months' imprisonment followed by expulsion. A second offence constituted high treason.

The act was one of the Penal Laws passed after the Williamite War to safeguard the Church of Ireland as the established church and from fears of Catholic clerical support for Jacobitism. It was foreshadowed by proclamations issued by the Dublin Castle administration in 1673 and 1678 with similar terms. The banishment was originally and most effectively applied to regular clergy, many of whom registered (under the Registration Act 1704) as parish priests to be treated as secular clergy and avoid deportation. The ban on bishops may have been intended to prevent ordination of new priests, which, coupled with a ban on clerical immigration, would lead to their eventual extinction. Of the eight Catholic bishops in Ireland when the act was passed, two left, one (John Sleyne) was arrested, and five went into hiding. The port authorities paid for the passage of 424 clerics who emigrated; Mary of Modena estimated that about 700 in total left, of whom 400 settled in France. Priest hunters were active in subsequent decades. Maurice Donnellan, Bishop of Clonfert, was arrested in 1703 but rescued by an armed crowd.

== Amendment and repeal ==
The act was gradually less stringently enforced as the eighteenth century progressed. The Roman Catholic Relief Act 1782 (21 & 22 Geo. 3. c. 24 (I)) provided that its provisions could not apply to a priest who had registered and taken the oath of supremacy. The act was explicitly repealed by the Statute Law Revision (Ireland) Act 1878.

== See also ==
- Catholic Emancipation
- Irish Church Act 1869
- Roman Catholicism in Ireland

== Bibliography ==
Primary

- "Bill 2059: For suppressing all friaries, monasteries, nunneries and other Popish convents, and for banishing all regulars of the Popish clergy out of this kingdom". Irish Legislation Database. Queens University Belfast.
- "9th of William III chap 1". Statutes Passed in the Parliaments Held in Ireland. Vol. II: 1665–1712. Dublin: George Grierson. 1794. pp. 287–291.
- Burke, William P. (1914). The Irish priests in the penal times (1660–1760) : from the State Papers in H.M. Record Office, Dublin and London, the Bodleian Library, and the British Museum. Waterford: Printed by N. Harvey & Co. for the author. ISBN 9780716500346.

Secondary

- Connolly, S. J. (2008). Divided Kingdom: Ireland 1630-1800. Oxford: OUP. ISBN 978-0-19-156243-3.
- Simms, J. G. (September 1970). "The Bishops' Banishment Act of 1697 (9 Will. III, c. 1)". Irish Historical Studies. 17 (66): 185–199. doi:10.1017/S0021121400111381. ISSN 0021-1214. JSTOR 30005134. S2CID 191800775.; reprinted in Simms, J. G. (1986). War and Politics in Ireland, 1649–1730. A&C Black. pp. 235–250. ISBN 978-0-8264-3609-2.
