= Popery Act =

United Kingdom legislation

Popery Act 1704 (Note: Or Popery Act 1703. No short title was assigned to the act before its repeal. Where a parliamentary session ran across more than one calendar year, an act's informal name sometimes uses the year in which it was granted royal assent, sometimes the year in which the parliamentary session began — in this case, Popery Act 1704 and Popery Act 1703 respectively.)
- Act of Parliament
- Parliament of Ireland
- Long title: An Act to prevent the further Growth of Popery
- Citation: 2 Anne c. 6 (I)
- Territorial extent: Ireland

Dates
- Royal assent: 4 March 1704
- Commencement: 24 March 1704 (Note: Section 1.)
- Repealed: 13 August 1878

Other legislation
- Amended by: Popery Act 1709; Leases for Lives Act 1777; Roman Catholic Relief Act 1793; Roman Catholic Relief Act 1829; Religious Disabilities Act 1846
- Repealed by: Promissory Oaths Act 1871; Statute Law Revision (Ireland) Act 1878
- Relates to: Education Act 1695; Security of the Succession, etc. Act 1702

Status: Repealed

Text of statute as originally enacted

An Act to prevent the further Growth of Popery (2 Anne c. 6 (I); commonly known as the Popery Act or the Gavelkind Act) was an act of the Parliament of Ireland that was passed in 1704 designed to suppress Roman Catholicism in Ireland ("Popery"). William Edward Hartpole Lecky called it the most notorious of the Irish Penal Laws.

Inheritance in traditional Irish law used gavelkind, whereby an estate was divided equally among a dead man's sons. In contrast, English common law used male primogeniture, with the eldest son receiving the entire estate. The 1704 act enforced gavelkind for Catholics and primogeniture for Protestants.

== Enactment ==
Two separate bills "to prevent the further Growth of Popery" were introduced in the parliamentary session 1703–1704. One originated with the Irish Privy Council and was referred on 4 July 1703 to the Attorney-General for Ireland; the other was introduced as heads of a bill in the Irish House of Commons on 28 September 1703 and sent to the Lord Lieutenant on 19 November. Under Poynings' Law, both bills were transmitted to the English Privy Council for approval. Formally, one bill was vetoed and the other was returned to Dublin with amendments; a lack of surviving documentation makes it impossible to determine which of the two had which fate. The approved bill was engrossed on 20 January, presented in the Commons on 14 February, sent to the Irish House of Lords on 25 February, and given royal assent on 4 March.

Sir Toby Butler, the former Solicitor General for Ireland, a Roman Catholic, made a celebrated speech at the bar of the Commons denouncing the act as being "against the laws of God and man... against the rules of reason and justice". Other eminent Catholic lawyers like Stephen Rice also denounced the measure but to no avail.

== Provisions ==
- Section 1 defined as praemunire the encouragement or act of apostasy from Protestantism to Catholicism. It also prohibited Catholics under 21 from going abroad without licence, to help enforce the prohibition in the Education Act 1695 (7 Will. 3. c. 4 (I)) on Catholic education overseas.
- Section 2 empowered judges to summon children to court to prove they had not gone abroad without licence under section 1.
- Section 3 empowered the Irish Chancery to take property from a Catholic parent to pay for their Protestant child's education. If the child was an eldest son, up to one-third of the parent's property could be transferred to him, the parent retained only a life interest.
- Section 4 prohibited Catholics from being legal guardians of Protestant children
- Section 5 extended the existing prohibition on Protestants marrying Catholics to include marriages abroad.
- Section 6 prohibited Catholics from buying land or leasing it for more than 31 years.
- Section 7 gave a Catholic acquiring title to real property six months in which to enter into possession of it, failing which it descended to the nearest Protestant relative.
- Section 8 was a proviso to section 7, whereby a nearer Catholic relative could pre-empt the Protestant relative by conforming to Protestantism within the six-month window
- Section 9 was a proviso to section 7, whereby the Protestant wife of a dispossessed Catholic remained entitled to her one-third dower.
- Section 10 mandated that inheritance from a Catholic would be by gavelkind, that is divided equally between all sons. If the deceased had no sons, the estate was likewise divided between his daughters, or the next closest kin.
- Section 11 was a proviso to section 10 to allow provision for daughters from the estate before the residue was subdivided among the sons.
- Section 12 was a proviso to section 10 to allow the eldest son to inherit the whole estate (by primogeniture) if he was a Protestant, or converted within three months of his father's death. Thus, the law had the effect of reducing the size and thus the influence of Roman Catholic landed estates, which was the act's ulterior motive.
- Section 13 mandated that inheritance from a Protestant would according to common law, that is primogeniture.
- Section 14 provided that debts of Catholics be registered with the Court of Exchequer, to ensure they were paid out of the estate before the application of gavelkind
- Section 15 required a putative Protestant to prove their religion by taking specified oaths of supremacy, abjuration and allegiance
- Section 16 required that, by August 1704, any person with an existing civil or military office must subscribe at quarter sessions to the declarations specified by the English Security of the Succession, etc. Act 1702 (1 Ann. c. 16) (Note: This is the citation in The Statutes of the Realm.) which rejected transubstantiation, abjured the Papacy and the Jacobite succession, and gave allegiance to Queen Anne. They must also "receive the sacrament of the Lord's Supper according to the usage of the Church of Ireland". As well as excluding Roman Catholics from office, the "sacramental test" excluded Protestant Dissenters, notably Presbyterians, and many had to step down from municipal corporations and other positions. For example, ten Aldermen and ten Burgesses had to resign from Londonderry Corporation.
- Section 17 required that, within three months of appointment, any person appointed to a civil or military office must take the same oath and sacrament as in section 16.
- Section 18 provided that failure to comply with sections 16 or 17 would vacate the office and void acts done by the official, who would be fined £500 and subject to civil penalties.
- Section 19 provided for rolls of those subscribing to the oaths under section 15 to 17 be kept at the Four Courts. The surviving "convert roll" details are a valuable primary source for historians of 18th-century Ireland.
- Section 20 empowered the Four Courts to administer the prescribed oaths
- Section 21 allowed someone disabled under section 18 to be rehabilitated by subsequent conformity.
- Section 22 allowed Irish people in England to take the equivalent oath and sacrament under the equivalent English laws (the Test Acts) and allowed those abroad elsewhere to do so when next in Ireland or England
- Section 23 prohibited Catholics from moving to Galway or Limerick, and required those already living there to deposit bonds with the corporations as proof of their loyalty.
- Section 24 required Catholics voting in elections for the Irish House of Commons to take oaths of allegiance and abjuration
- Section 25 provided that any advowsons of the Church of Ireland owned by Catholics would vest in the Crown
- Section 26 declared that "superstitious" gatherings at Saint Patrick's Purgatory or holy wells were punishable as unlawful assembly
- Section 27 declared that, for an assembly under section 26, the punishment for attending was a fine of 10 shillings, or public whipping in default; the punishment for hawking was a fine of 20 shillings by distraint, or debtor's prison in default
- Section 28 made an exception to section 23 for "seamen, fishermen, and day labourers" in houses worth under "forty shillings the year". A forty-shilling freehold qualified for the parliamentary franchise in a county borough constituency.

== Effect ==
Charles Ivar McGrath says that while the Popery Act had "evident ... negative effects", specific research is lacking, and that it was intended more to prevent an increase in Catholic landholding than encourage further decrease: the Catholic share of land had already fallen from 60% before the 1641 Rebellion to 22% before the Williamite War to 14% in 1704. The figure of 5% in 1776 given in Arthur Young's Tour in Ireland is probably an underestimate, although in 1778 only 1.5% of rent was paid to Catholics.

Catholic gavelkind cemented a tradition of farm subdivision, which persisted beyond the act's repeal and contributed to the Great Famine of the 1840s.

Lord Redesdale, the Lord Chancellor of Ireland, remarked in an 1805 case, based on a disputed inheritance of an estate originally purchased before and after 1704 by a Catholic:

The purpose of [2 Anne c. 6 (I)] was to disable papists from purchasing lands in future; and to make all lands of which any papist was or should be seised in fee or in tail, of the nature of gavelkind, and, if not sold in his life-time for money, really and bonâ fide paid, to descend accordingly, notwithstanding any other disposition, but subject to debts and provision for daughters: and in case of conformity of the eldest son, the act reduced the father to the condition of tenant for life, and gave the inheritance to the conforming son, subject to provisions for younger children. The second act [8 Anne c. 3 (I)] is of a different kind. It was conceived that the first act was evaded in consequence of those who had a right to avail themselves of it not doing so. The second act, therefore, gives a right to any protestant to avail himself of the former act for his own benefit, and to file a bill for a discovery of all trusts or purchases made by, or on behalf of papists, contrary to the provisions of the former act, and to take the benefit of the same, as if made to or for such protestant discoverer. The result was, that although the first act made a purchase by a papist void, the second act made the purchase valid for the benefit of a protestant discoverer; and thus, that which was void as between the parties, was good for the benefit of a third person.

These acts had so embarrassed all the titles in the country, that if no other motive had occurred, it would have been a measure of policy to relax their severity: for no law is sufficient to restrain the desire of possessing landed property, and to evade these restrictive laws, contrivances were used, which perplexed almost every title, and made every protestant insecure in the possession of lands derived through a papist.

In 1866, Chancery Commissioners reported that the Law of Judgments was much more complicated in Ireland than in England, and traced the difference back to the steps introduced in Ireland to enforce the 1704 act and ensure property was not being secretly transferred from Protestants to Catholics.

== Subsequent developments ==
The act was "explained and amended" by a Popery Act 1709, [8 Anne c. 3 (I)], which specified certain time limits left ambiguous by the original act, and closed some loopholes used by Catholics to remain beneficial owners of nominally Protestant property.

A 1719 act, 6 Geo. 1. c. 9 (I) indemnified officials who had not thitherto subscribed to the oath required by the Popery Act. The time period for Dissenters subscribing to the oath was routinely extended, initially by an Indemnity Act at the start of each biennial parliamentary session. Similar acts were passed by the British parliament, and after the union the UK parliament continued the practice. This act was repealed by Promissory Oaths Act 1871.

From the late 18th century Roman Catholic relief bills eased the Penal Laws, by explicit or implicit repeal and replacement. In 1772 Catholics were allowed to lease up to 50 Irish acres of bog-land for up to 61 years by the act 11 & 12 Geo. 3. c. 21 (I), repealed by Statute Law Revision (Pre-Union Irish Statutes) Act 1962. The 1704 oath of allegiance for Catholics was replaced in 1774 by Roman Catholic Relief Act 1773 [13 & 14 Geo. 3. c. 35 (I)], repealed by Promissory Oaths Act 1871.. Gardiner's Act, the Leases for Lives Act 1777 (17 & 18 Geo. 3. c. 49 (I)) (the Irish re-enactment of the British Papists Act 1778 (18 Geo. 3. c. 60)) implicitly repealed many other provisions of the 1704 act. Some were replaced with less onerous restrictions; for example, the maximum lease for Catholic tenants was increased from 31 years to 999 years. The restrictions on inheritance and preference for a convert eldest son were abolished. The sacramental test was repealed for Dissenters in 1780. (Note: The 1780 act referred to "Protestants". A 1793 act, 33 Geo. 3. c. 51 (I), clarified that the 1780 act only applied to Dissenters, not members of the established Church of Ireland. An 1832 act, the Sacramental Test (Ireland) Act 1832 (2 & 3 Will. 4. c. 7), repealed the 1793 act and extended the 1780 act to all Protestants.) The Roman Catholic Relief Act 1782 (21 & 22 Geo. 3. c. 24 (I)) repealed section 23 of the 1704 act. Another act of 1782, 21 & 22 Geo. 3. c. 62 (I), allowed lay Catholics to be guardians of Protestants. Most restrictions on intermarriage were removed by the Roman Catholic Relief Act 1792 (32 Geo. 3. c. 21 (I)). Many Penal Laws were repealed in general terms by the Roman Catholic Relief Act 1793; the sacramental test for Catholics was effectively replaced by the 1774 oath. (Note: In consequence, the Sacramental Test Act 1828 (9 Geo. 4. c. 17) did not extend to Ireland.)

The Roman Catholic Relief Act 1829 (10 Geo. 4. c. 7) abolished the declaration against transubstantiation specified a new public oath for Catholics, explicitly permitted Catholics to hold Irish civil or military offices other than Lord Lieutenant and Lord Chancellor, with the same oaths as required of non-Catholics (in addition to the new Catholic oath).

The Criminal Law Commission's 1845 report on oaths said sections 1, 3, and 6 of the 1704 act had fallen into disuse and should be repealed. The Religious Disabilities Act 1846 (9 & 10 Vict. c. 59), passed in consequence of the committee's report, explicitly repealed provisions of sections 1, 3, and 4 of the 1704 act.

The whole act, except section 25, was repealed by section 1 of, and part II of schedule three to, the Promissory Oaths Act 1871 (34 & 35 Vict. c. 48), which came into force on 13 July 1871.

Section 25 of the act was made redundant by the coming into force in 1871 of the Irish Church Act 1869 (32 & 33 Vict. c. 42), and was repealed by section 1 of, and the schedule to, the Statute Law Revision (Ireland) Act 1878 (41 & 42 Vict. c. 57), which came into force on 13 August 1878.

== Bibliography ==
- Bartlett, Thomas (1992). The Fall and Rise of the Irish Nation : The Catholic Question, 1690–1830. Savage, Maryland: Barnes & Noble. ISBN 978-0-389-20974-4.
- Curry, John (1786). "Appendix XVI: Account of the Debates on the Popery Laws, 2 Ann.". An Historical and Critical Review of the Civil Wars in Ireland. Vol. 2. Dublin: Luke White. pp. 386–399.
- McGrath, Charles Ivar (29 October 2021). "The Penal Laws: Origins, Purpose, Enforcement and Impact". In Costello, Kevin; Howlin, Niamh (eds.). Law and Religion in Ireland, 1700–1970. Palgrave Modern Legal History. Springer Nature. pp. 13–48. doi:10.1007/978-3-030-74373-4_2. ISBN 978-3-030-74373-4.
- Simms, J.G. (October 1960). "The making of a penal law (2 Anne, c.6), 1703–4". Irish Historical Studies. 12 (46): 105–118. doi:10.1017/S0021121400019660. JSTOR 30005169.
