= Education Act 1695 =

Act of the Parliament of Ireland

- Act of Parliament
- Parliament of Ireland
- Long title: An Act to restrain Foreign Education.
- Citation: 7 Will. 3. c. 4 (I)
- Territorial extent: Ireland

Dates
- Royal assent: 7 September 1695
- Commencement: 1695
- Repealed: 1782, 1878

Status: Repealed

Text of statute as originally enacted

The Education Act 1695 (7 Will. 3. c. 4 (I)), "An Act to restrain Foreign Education", was one of a series of Penal Laws enacted by the Parliament of Ireland to secure the Protestant Ascendancy in the wake of the Williamite War. It prohibited the Catholics from sending their children abroad to receive a Catholic education.

Section 1 ruled:

In case any of his Majesty's subjects of Ireland shall go or send any child or other person beyond the seas to be trained in any popish university, college or school, or in any private popish family, or shall send any money for the support of any such person, then the person sending and the person sent shall, upon conviction, be disabled to prosecute any action in a court of law, or be a guardian or executor, or receive any legacy or gift, or bear any public office, and shall forfeit all their lands and estates during their lives.

At the same time, it sought to prohibit Catholics from delivering formal education in Ireland.

Section 9 read:

Whereas it has been found by experience that tolerating at Papists keeping school or instructing youth in literature is one great reason of many of the natives continuing ignorant of the principles of the true religion… no person of the Popish religion shall publicly teach school or instruct youth… upon pain of 20 pounds and prison for three months for every such offence...

It further required that "every schoolmaster … conform to the Church of Ireland as it is now by law established", and that this conformity be certified by license from an Anglican bishop.

== Subsequent developments ==
A result of the act's prohibitions was the proliferation in Ireland of so-called "hedge schools," small secretly convened classes meeting behind hedgerows or more frequently, as enforcement of the law relaxed, in barns and private homes. Children of "non-conforming" faiths (principally Catholic, but also Presbyterian) were given the rudiments of a primary education (sometimes in Irish, sometimes in English, or in both). Some teachers would also teach secondary studies including classical languages and literature. Some of those teachers were beneficiaries of a prohibited continental education; or, in the case of Presbyterians, a Scottish education.

Enforcement targeted Catholic schools run by religious orders, whose property was confiscated. But from 1723 no hedge teachers are known to have been prosecuted. The 1782, a reforming Irish Parliament ("Grattan's Parliament") passed the Roman Catholic Relief Act 1782 (21 & 22 Geo. 3. c. 24 (I)) which repealed the 1695 act, although it was still provided that Catholic schoolmasters had to take an oath of allegiance to the British Crown and could not teach any Protestant children. Along with other laws of the former Irish parliament no longer enforced, the whole act was repealed by the Westminster Parliament by section 1 of, and the schedule to, the Statute Law Revision (Ireland) Act 1878 (41 & 42 Vict. c. 57).
