= Disfranchising Act 1727 =

Act of the Parliament of Ireland

- Act of Parliament
- Parliament of Ireland
- Long title: An Act for the further regulating the Election of Members of Parliament, and preventing the irregular Proceedings of Sheriffs and other Officers in electing and returning such Members.
- Citation: 1 Geo. 2. c. 9 (I)
- Territorial extent: Ireland

Dates
- Royal assent: 6 May 1728
- Commencement: 1 May 1728 (Note: Section 1.)
- Repealed: 13 August 1878

Other legislation
- Repealed by: Statute Law Revision (Ireland) Act 1878
- Relates to: Roman Catholic Relief Act 1793; Roman Catholic Relief Act 1829

Status: Repealed

Text of statute as originally enacted

The Disfranchising Act 1727 (1 Geo. 2. c. 9 (I)) was an act of Parliament of the Parliament of Ireland debated in 1727 and enacted in 1728, one of a series of Penal Laws, and prohibited all Roman Catholics from voting in parliamentary elections. Its full title is "An Act for the further regulating the Election of Members of Parliament, and preventing the irregular Proceedings of Sheriffs and other Officers in electing and returning such Members". It received royal assent on 6 May 1728.

In the 18th century, elections were held at irregular intervals and at the beginning of a new reign. The act followed the death of George I on 11 June 1727 but did not take effect until after the election of 1727, coming into force in 1728.

== Subsequent developments ==
The act was superseded by the Roman Catholic Relief Act 1793 (33 Geo. 3. c. 21 (I)), allowing the franchise in Ireland to all men holding a property with a rental value of at least two pounds annually.

The whole act was eventually repealed by section 1 of, and the schedule to, the Statute Law Revision (Ireland) Act 1878 (41 & 42 Vict. c. 57).

== See also ==
- Religion in the United Kingdom
