= William O'Brien (judge) =

Irish judge

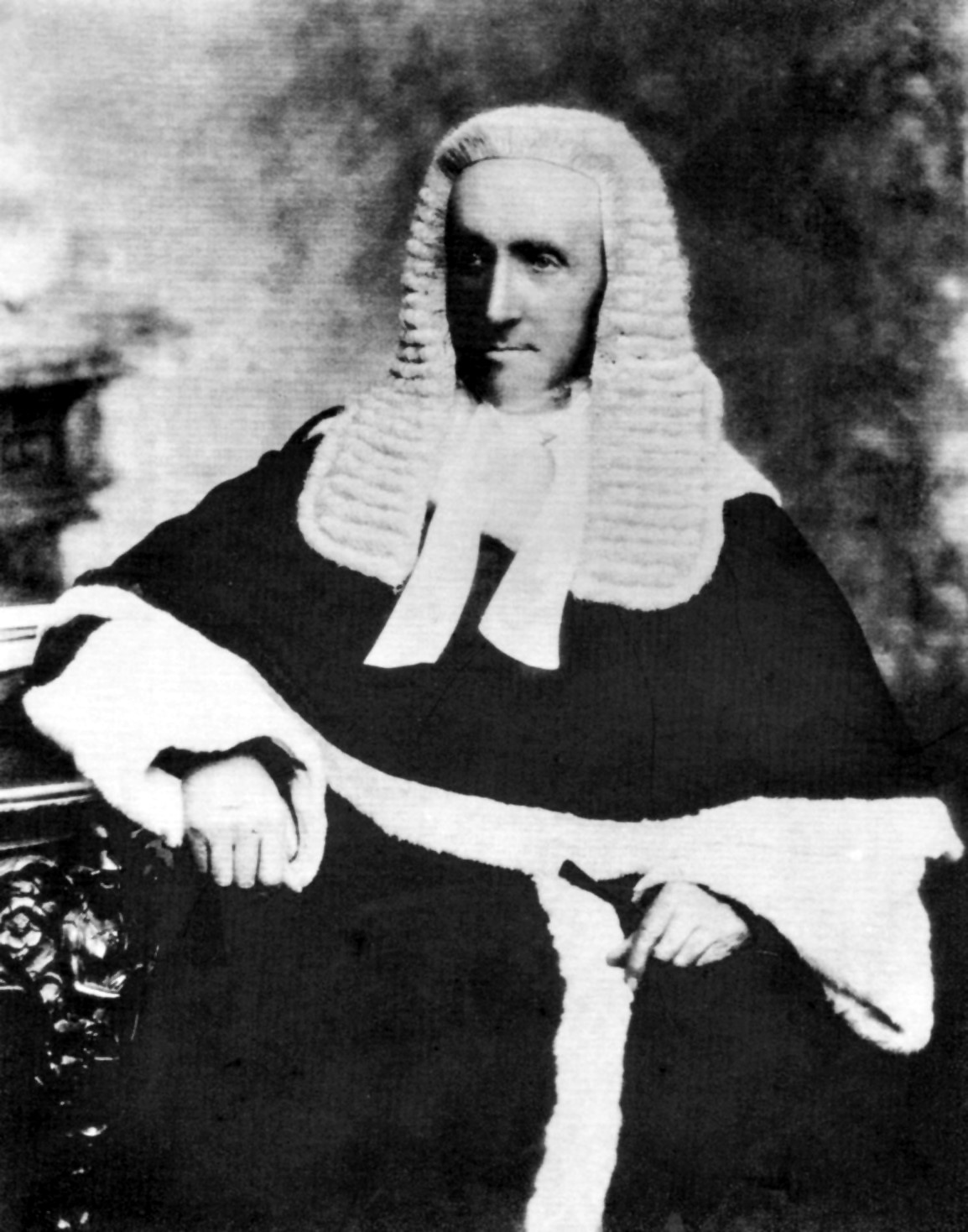
William O'Brien

William O'Brien (1832–1899) was an Irish judge. He is mainly remembered now for presiding at the trials which resulted from the Phoenix Park murders. He was also a noted bibliophile, who created one of Ireland's most valuable collections of antiquarian books.

== Biography ==
He was born at Bloomfield, County Cork, son of John O'Brien and his wife Mary Bunbury of Kilfeade. He went to school at Midleton College, entered Gray's Inn in 1852, and was called to the Irish Bar in 1855, becoming Queen's Counsel in 1872. To supplement his earnings he also worked for a time as a journalist. He built up a large practice and became wealthy enough to endow a chapel in Newman University Church, St. Stephen's Green. Elrington Ball regarded him as a fine criminal lawyer: Maurice Healy by contrast thought that he was rather lazy, with the traditional barrister's fault of arguing a case without having read his brief properly. Unlike most senior Irish barristers of his time, he was not a full-time politician, although he stood unsuccessfully for the House of Commons in 1879.

He was appointed a judge of the High Court of Justice in Ireland in 1882, serving in the Queen's Bench Division until his death in 1899. Even his glowing obituary in the Law Times admitted that he had not been highly thought of as a barrister, and it was believed that he owed his appointment to the influence of his friend the Lord Chancellor of Ireland, Sir Edward Sullivan, 1st Baronet, who was almost all-powerful in the choice of judges. Apart from the Phoenix Park case, his most notable trial was of Patrick Delaney for the attempted murder of O'Brien's colleague James Anthony Lawson. He also presided at the Lough Mask Murders trial at the end of 1882. He was a devout Roman Catholic, and notably punctilious in his religious observance. He never married.

From the 1880s, O'Brien amassed a large and valuable collection of antiquarian books, which he bequeathed on his death to the Irish province of the Jesuits, who put it up for auction in 2017. The collection includes a third folio of the Plays of William Shakespeare and a first edition of Gulliver's Travels.

== Phoenix Park Murders ==
=== Murders ===
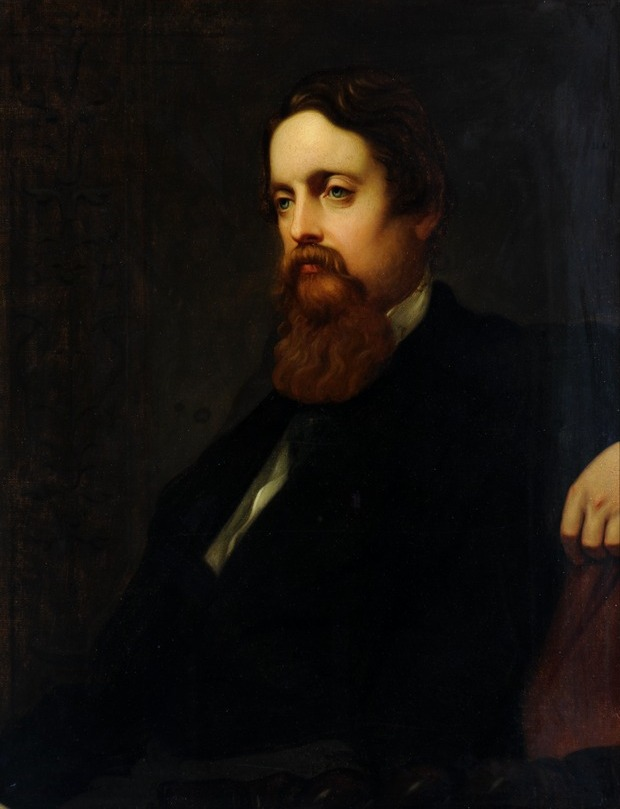
Lord Frederick Cavendish

On 6 May 1882 the newly arrived Chief Secretary for Ireland, Lord Frederick Cavendish, went for a walk in Phoenix Park, near his official residence, with Thomas Burke, the long-serving Under-Secretary. They were attacked by members of a secret society, the Irish National Invincibles, which had planned Burke's assassination. Cavendish, who was not the killers' intended target, intervened to save Burke and both men were stabbed to death.

The police were criticised in the press for conducting a dilatory investigation, but in fact, Superintendent John Mallon, who was in charge of the case, quickly learned the identity of the killers through his network of informers, and within a few months arrested all of them, together with a number of accessories to the crime.

=== Trials ===
Under interrogation James Carey, the leader of the Invincibles, cracked: he was persuaded to turn informer against his fellow assassins, as were Michael Kavanagh and Joe Hanlon.

In a lengthy series of trials beginning on 11 April 1883 Joe Brady, Tim Kelly, Dan Corley, Thomas Caffrey and Michael Fagan were tried and convicted for murder; all were subsequently hanged. The driver of the cab, James Fitzharris (nicknamed Skin-the-Goat) was acquitted of murder but served a prison sentence as an accessory, as did Patrick Delaney, the would-be assassin of Mr. Justice Lawson, and several others.

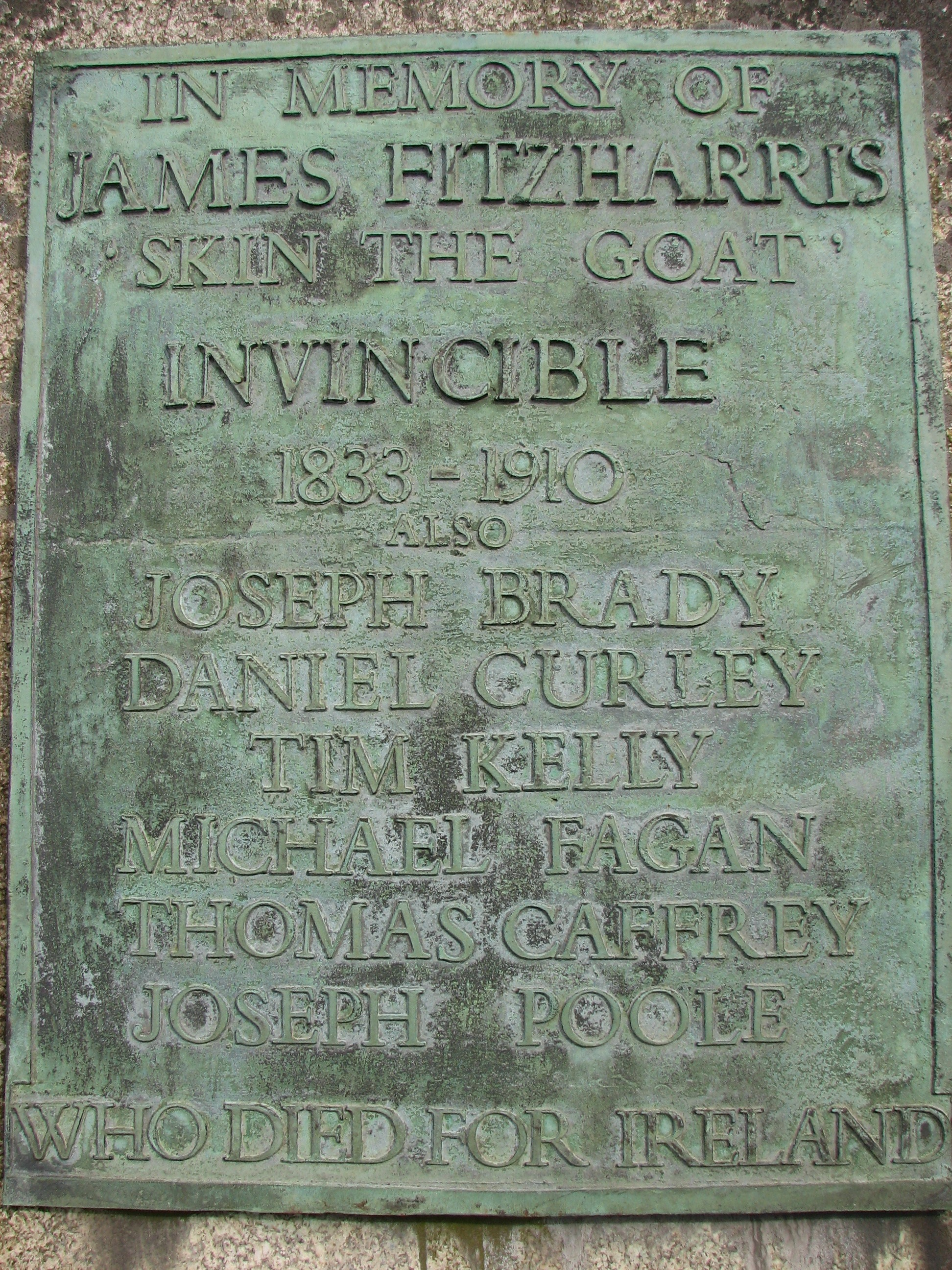
Grave of James Fitzharris, alias ""Skin the Goat", the driver in the Phoenix Park murders

The only case which gave any real difficulty was that of Tim Kelly. He was still in his teens and of exceptionally youthful appearance: the impression, of which his defence counsel took full advantage, that a child was being tried for murder, took hold of the public's imagination. Two juries had qualms about condemning him and he was convicted only after an unprecedented third trial.

=== Judge's role at the trial ===
Maurice Healy, who had an extremely poor opinion of O'Brien, called his conduct of the trials grossly unfair, in particular, the trial of Joe Brady, whose counsel in Healy's opinion were given inadequate time to prepare his defence. On the other hand, Senan Moloney, in his detailed account of the murders, makes no serious criticism of the judge. His summing-up may have indicated his belief in the guilt of all the accused, but this was permitted in the judge's summing up in Ireland, as also in England, and in fact, there is little doubt that they were all guilty. While the three trials of Tim Kelly caused some public unease, the decision to retry him was the Government's, not the judge's.

== Reputation ==
Probably the fullest sketch of O'Brien's character is by Maurice Healy in his memoir The Old Munster Circuit (1939). Since Healy was extremely proud of the overall quality of the Irish judiciary in his youth, it is interesting that he made an exception for O'Brien, whom he called "a man who worked more injustice in his daily round that the reader would believe possible". Healy's description of O'Brien must, however, be treated with caution: he was a child of twelve when the judge died, and although as a schoolboy he would sometimes attend Court when O'Brien was sitting, he admits that most of what he knew of him was second-hand.

In context, Maurice Healy's uncle Tim Healy MP was a prominent nationalist barrister and an activist in the 1880s "Land War" who had to find fault with all aspects of the British administration of Ireland, of which Judge O'Brien was inevitably a part.

O'Brien also presided over the Lough Mask murder trials and many questions about his competence and impartiality remain unanswered.

Healy thought that O'Brien's conduct of the Phoenix Park trials was unjust and that this was typical of his conduct in criminal cases in general: O'Brien invariably regarded the accused's guilt as self-evident, did everything possible to assist the prosecution, and disregarded the fundamental rule that the jury in determining the accused's guilt or innocence must not hear evidence of any prior convictions. In civil cases, though less biased, he was impatient and argumentative, but since most senior members of the Bar, at a time when barristers prided themselves on their frankness, had no respect for him he was unable to impose his authority in Court. Healy recalls a story that when O'Brien angrily told Serjeant Ronan, one of the leaders of the Irish Bar, that it is the judge's task to lay down the law, Ronan replied that if a judge does not know the law, as O'Brien clearly did not, it is counsel's task to teach it to him. On another occasion he asked Walter Boyd "where is your respect for this court?". Boyd, who was always famous for plain speaking, replied that "the Court is receiving the exact degree of respect it deserves".

A more serious charge which Healy repeated, and apparently thought credible, was that O'Brien once took a bribe to influence the outcome of a libel action; such a charge of corruption is almost without precedent in the history of the Irish judiciary. The rumour must be treated with caution since as already noted Healy's knowledge of O'Brien was largely second-hand, nor does there seem to be any other evidence that the judge was corrupt.

Francis Elrington Ball, in his definitive study of the pre-Independence Irish judiciary, gives a shorter but much more favourable view of O'Brien, whom he regarded as a good lawyer, and also a man of courage who was prepared to put his life in danger by presiding at the Phoenix Park trials. That O'Brien had his admirers is clear from his obituary in the Law Times which called him a great judge in respect of learning, intellect and character. Healy believed that he lacked all these qualities, although he admitted that in private life the judge was a kindly and charitable man.
