= Mary Ann Byrne =

Irish nationalist (1854–1894)

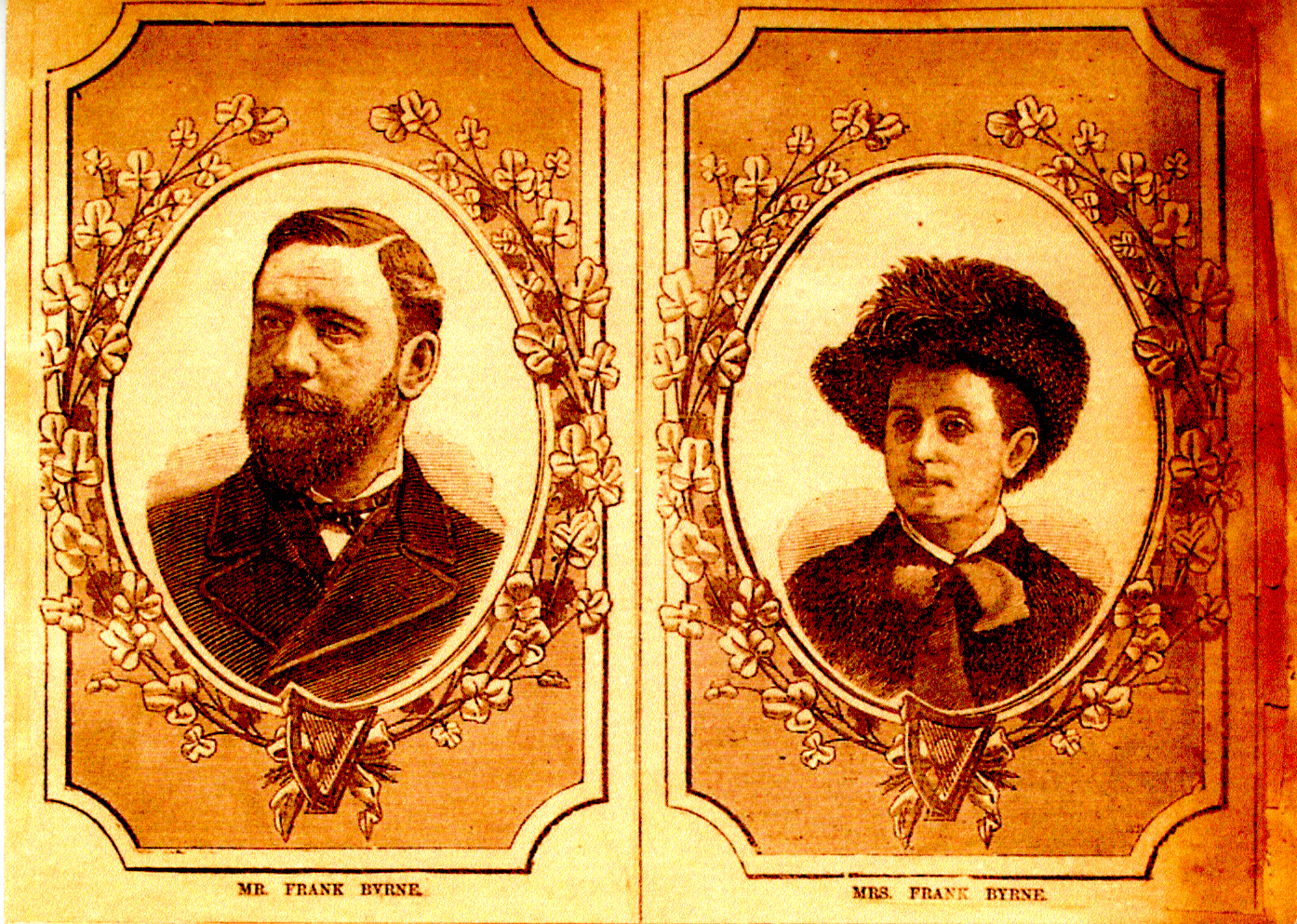
- Mr and Mrs Frank Byrne
- Born: Mary Ann Moneypenny; 9 September 1854; Haddington Road, Dublin
- Died: 4 November 1894 (aged 40); Rhode Island, United States

Mary Ann Byrne (née Moneypenny; 9 September 1854 – 4 November 1894) was an Irish revolutionary.

== Biography ==
Born Mary Ann Moneypenny on Haddington Road, Dublin on 9 September 1854, she was the second daughter of a plasterer, Arthur Moneypenny, and his wife, Frances (née Kelly). She married Frank Byrne in St Mary's Catholic Church, Dukinfield, Ashton-under-Lyne on 9 September 1876, with both living in Peel Street, Dukinfield, at the time.

Committed to the Irish nationalist cause, she is believed to have delivered the surgical knives used in the assassinations of the Permanent Under Secretary Thomas Henry Burke and the newly installed Chief Secretary for Ireland, Lord Frederick Cavendish (the Phoenix Park Murders), to the Irish National Invincibles in February 1882 when she was seven months pregnant, concealing the knives under her skirts. On another occasion, she reportedly delivered two revolvers, a rifle and a large amount of ammunition to other Invincibles.

The evidence of James Carey implicated Byrne in the Phoenix Park Murders, leading to her arrest at her home on Avondale Road, Peckham Rye, south London in February 1883. However, Carey could not positively identify her in a lineup as the woman who delivered the arms and she was released. A few weeks later she traveled to America to join her husband. At a meeting in New York to honour the five executed Invincibles in May 1885, she was presented with a "well-filled purse" and pronounced a "brave little woman" who was "as true as steel to all those heroic ideas of womanhood which typify the feminine character of Ireland." She became a member of an American ladies' committee which erected a monument to Patrick O’Donnell (who had been executed for the murder of James Carey) in Glasnevin in April 1887.

Byrne developed paralysis in 1891. In June 1894, believing she was near death, she told an American journalist that Parnell was unconnected to the Invincibles. She died on 4 November 1894. Her husband had died earlier that same year and they were buried at Old Saint Mary's Cemetery, Pawtucket, Rhode Island.
