= Patrick O'Donnell (Invincible) =

Irish assassin (1835–1883)

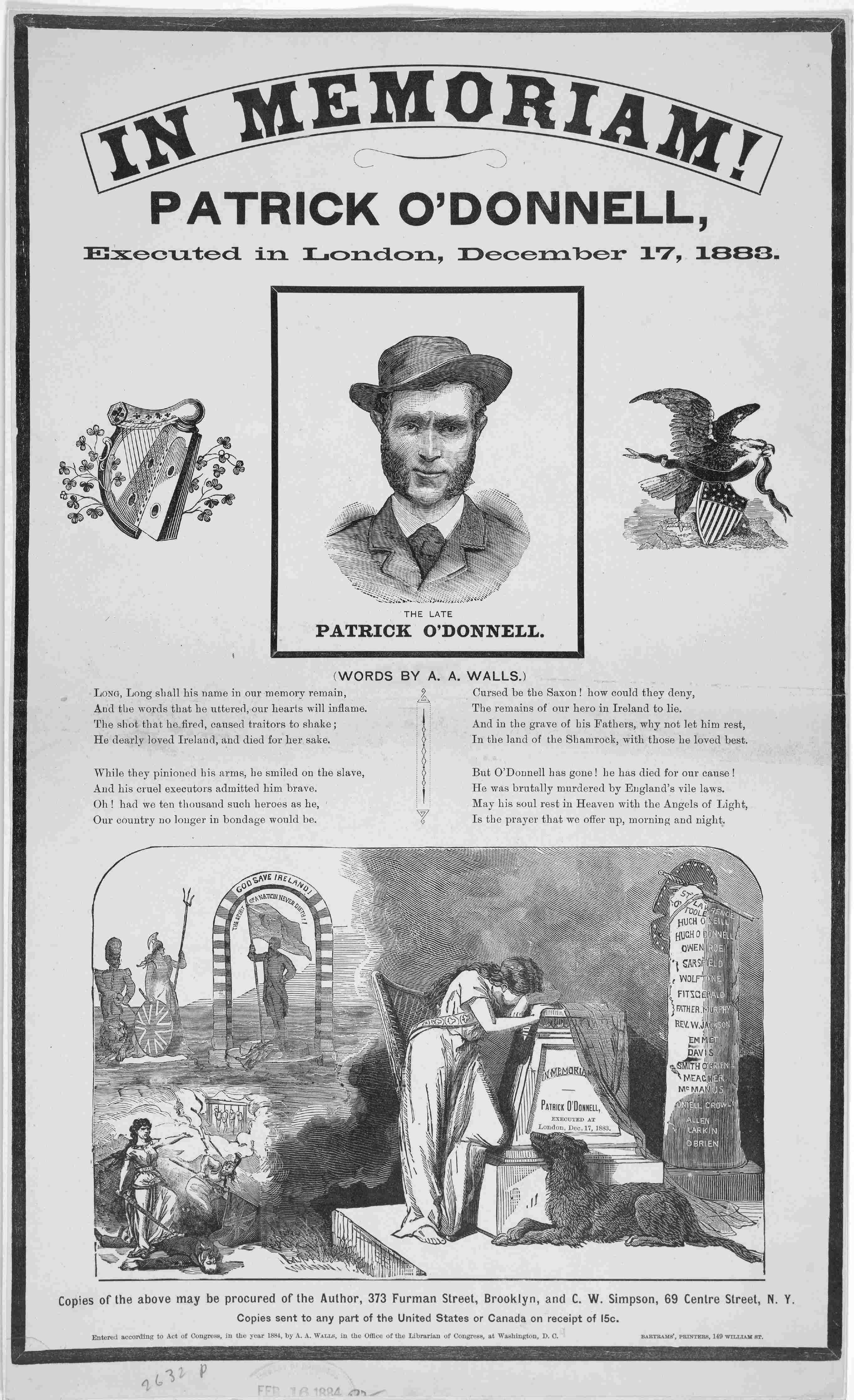
US Poster honoring Patrick O'Donnell.

Patrick O'Donnell (Irish: Pádraig Ó Domhnaill; 1835 – 17 December 1883) was an Irish republican executed for the murder of James Carey, whose testimony for the prosecution led to the executions of five men adjudged responsible for the Phoenix Park Murders. O'Donnell was from Gweedore, County Donegal.

== The Phoenix Park Murders and Carey's death ==
On 6 May 1882, the most senior Irish civil servant, the Permanent Undersecretary, Thomas Henry Burke and the newly appointed Chief Secretary for Ireland, Lord Frederick Cavendish – who was also the nephew of Prime Minister William Ewart Gladstone – were killed as they walked through Phoenix Park in Dublin by a man who stabbed them both with hospital scalpels. Most accounts indicate that Burke alone, not Cavendish, was the intended target. Cavendish happened to be in the wrong place at the wrong time.

=== The Irish National Invincibles ===
A number of republican groups were involved in revolutionary activity in the US and the UK. Among these was the Irish Republican Brotherhood, founded in the United States on 17 March (St. Patrick's Day), 1858, and widely known as the Fenians. The group carried out a number of paramilitary activities against British targets, especially in Great Britain, targeting prisons and arsenals. Their expressed goal was full independence for Ireland and the creation of an Irish Republic. A more radical splinter group, the Invincibles, planned to assassinate Thomas Burke, a Catholic civil servant who had long served as the under-secretary of the Irish Office. The new Chief Secretary of Ireland, Lord Frederick Cavendish, was not an intended victim but happened to be out walking with Burke at the time of the attack.

The "National Irish Invincibles" claimed responsibility for the killings. The hunt for the perpetrators was led by the Royal Irish Constabulary's Superintendent John Mallon, who arrested a number of suspects. Among them was James Carey, a town councilman in Dublin who struck a deal and turned Queen's evidence. Although Carey was reportedly the Mastermind of the assassinations, he agreed to testify against his underlings. Following Carey's testimony, five men were hanged at Kilmainham Jail for the killings between May and June 1883: Joe Brady, Daniel Curley, Tim Kelly, Thomas Caffrey and Michael Fagan.

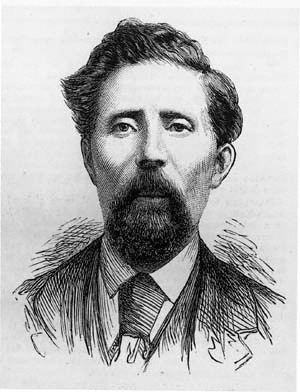
James Carey, by unknown engraver, published 1883

As part of the deal, Carey was given a new identity and safe passage to the Cape Colony. He travelled under the assumed name of "James Power" on the steamer Kinfauns Castle with his wife and seven children. He later changed boats to The Melrose for the second part of the voyage. O'Donnell, who had come from the United States via Donegal and London, travelled on the same ships, in the company of a young Donegal woman, who purported to be his wife (although it is alleged he was married to another woman). Carey maintained his assumed identity for most of the voyage, but later let his guard down, provoking a row in Cape Town and displaying his revolver. A barman there became aware of Carey's true identity, and informed O'Donnell.

The two men had been drinking together in the second class cabin aboard The Melrose before shots were fired, somewhere between Table Bay and Algoa Bay. O'Donnell shot Carey in the neck and twice more in the back as he staggered away. It was later suggested that O'Donnell was sent by the Invincibles to exact revenge upon the informer but this is disputed by historians, the prevailing opinion being that O'Donnell only discovered Carey's true identity while on board. This was a central debate at his trial. O'Donnell was arrested and transported to London to stand trial for first degree murder at the Old Bailey and executed for murder on 17 December 1883 at Newgate prison. He was 48 years old.

=== Jubilation throughout Ireland ===
Upon hearing of Carey's death, eight huge bonfires were lit around Carey's old home in Dublin, effigies in his likeness were burned, and bands playing Irish rebel songs marched followed by crowds of people.

== O'Donnell trial ==
The trial took place at the Old Bailey from 30 November 1883 to 1 December 1883.

The proceedings were presided over by Judge George Denman. The prosecution was led by Sir Henry James, Attorney General, and Messrs. Portland and Wright. O'Donnell was represented by Sir Charles Russell, MP, afterward Lord Chief Justice of England, Alexander Martin Sullivan, Messr. Guy, and assisted by General Roger A. Pryor, from the United States, sent by Irish-Americans following the case. Pryor could not legally represent O'Donnell as he was not a member of the bar in the UK and took only an advisory role.

As there was no proof that O'Donnell had set upon his voyage with the intention to murder Carey, the case was made that the informer had been recognised by a fellow passenger on the Kinfauns Castle, Robert Thomas Cubbit, who testified that he had guessed "Power"'s real identity when he was shown a copy of the Dublin Weekly Freeman with Carey's portrait in it, along with a description of his testimony against his fellow Invincibles. Cubbit told the court that when he had shown this portrait to O'Donnell, the latter had said, "I'll shoot him".

A similar portrait was later found among O'Donnell's possessions. Carey's wife appeared as a witness and claimed O'Donnell told her "I was sent to do it". Her son, Tom, testified that O'Donnell had said either "Shake hands on it, Mrs. Carey. I was sent to do it" or "I had to do it", but his testimony was discredited due to many inconsistencies between what he said at the trial and at the preliminary hearing. Among them was how his father's gun was in his possession after his murder. He alternately said he had run to their cabin to fetch the gun for his father; that he had the gun to keep it out of his mother's way. He denied he had told Walter Young, at Port Elizabeth that he had run to get his father's gun "but it was not there; father had it".

The defence put forward an argument of self-defence. Witnesses recalled seeing only one pistol, in O'Donnell's possession. Russell argued that to be surely because of poor light and that Carey most certainly had a gun on his person at all time for his own protection, especially since his identity had been discovered. The defence counsel spoke for four hours and put it to the jury that Carey had most assuredly produced his pistol. The same pistol had been found to be in his son's possession. After deliberating for only two hours, the jury returned a verdict of guilty of wilful murder at 9 p.m. on 1 December 1883, upon which O'Donnell was sentenced by the judge to death by hanging.

After passing sentence, the judge refused to let O'Donnell speak. Even so, he shouted "Three cheers for old Ireland! Goodbye, United States! To hell with the British and the British Crown!"

The President of the United States at the time, Chester A. Arthur, officially petitioned on behalf of O'Donnell once it was determined he had acquired American citizenship.

The veracity of the claim was brought into question, and it was suggested that he had stolen another individual's papers. After his execution, the United States House of Representatives passed a bill requiring the Secretary of State to present all "communications, documents and papers in his possession relating to the trial, conviction, and execution of the late Patrick O'Donnell".

== Links to secret organisations ==
=== Molly Maguires connection ===
O'Donnell spent time in the United States in the anthracite coal-mining region of Pennsylvania, where he stayed with cousins who were members of the Molly Maguires, an Irish-American secret society named after an Irish anti-landlord group of the same name. The O'Donnells comprised some of the top members involved in some of the Mollies' best-known feats. A plot was hatched by their enemies to kill the family; some were either murdered with others managing to escape, in what became known as the Wiggans Patch Massacre.

O'Donnell reportedly retaliated against some of those involved in the attacks on his family. O'Donnell's links to the Mollies and his revenge against Carey are believed to have inspired Sir Arthur Conan Doyle's book, The Valley of Fear.

== Memorial ==
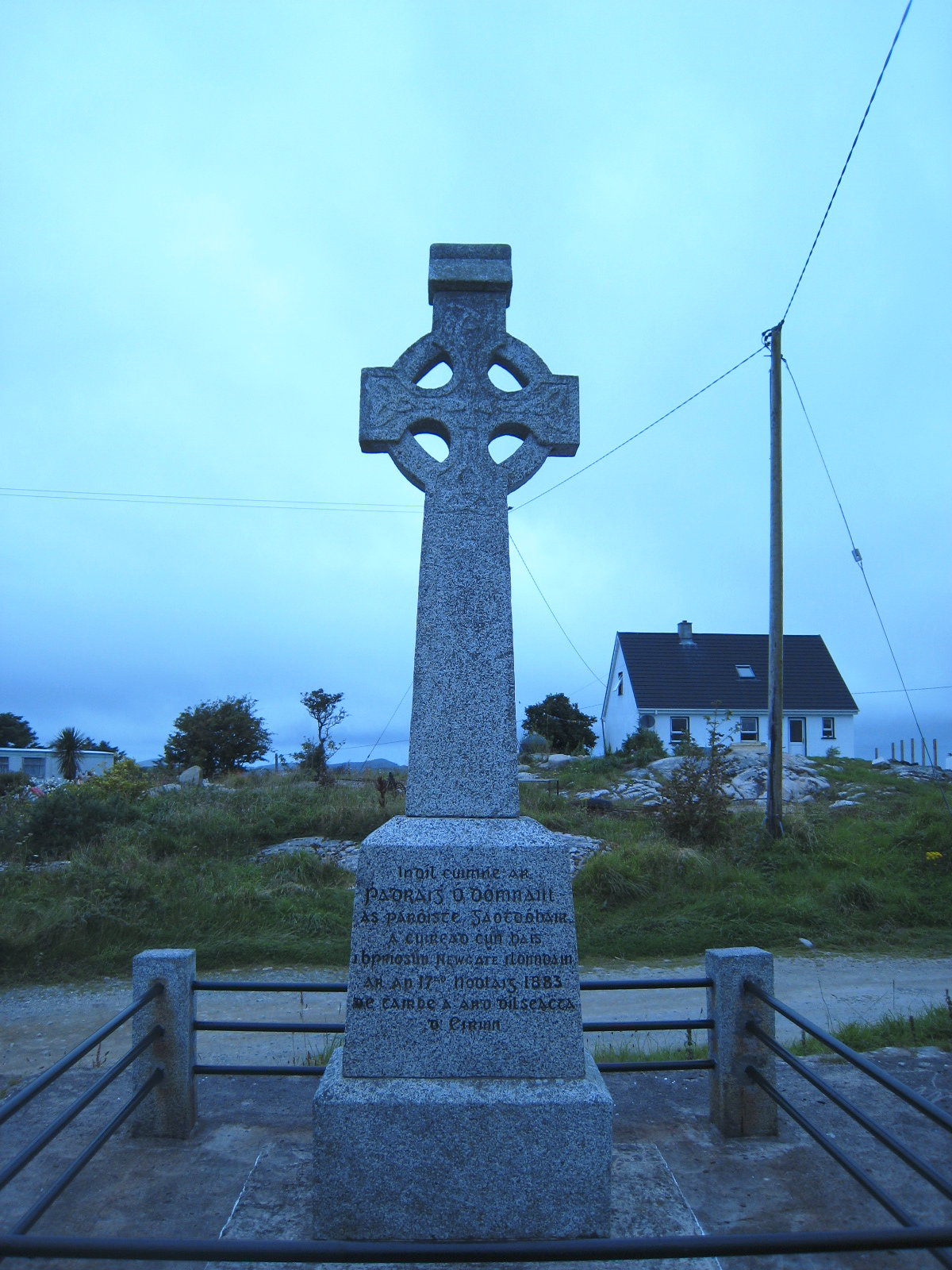
Celtic Cross Memorial in Gweedore, County Donegal.

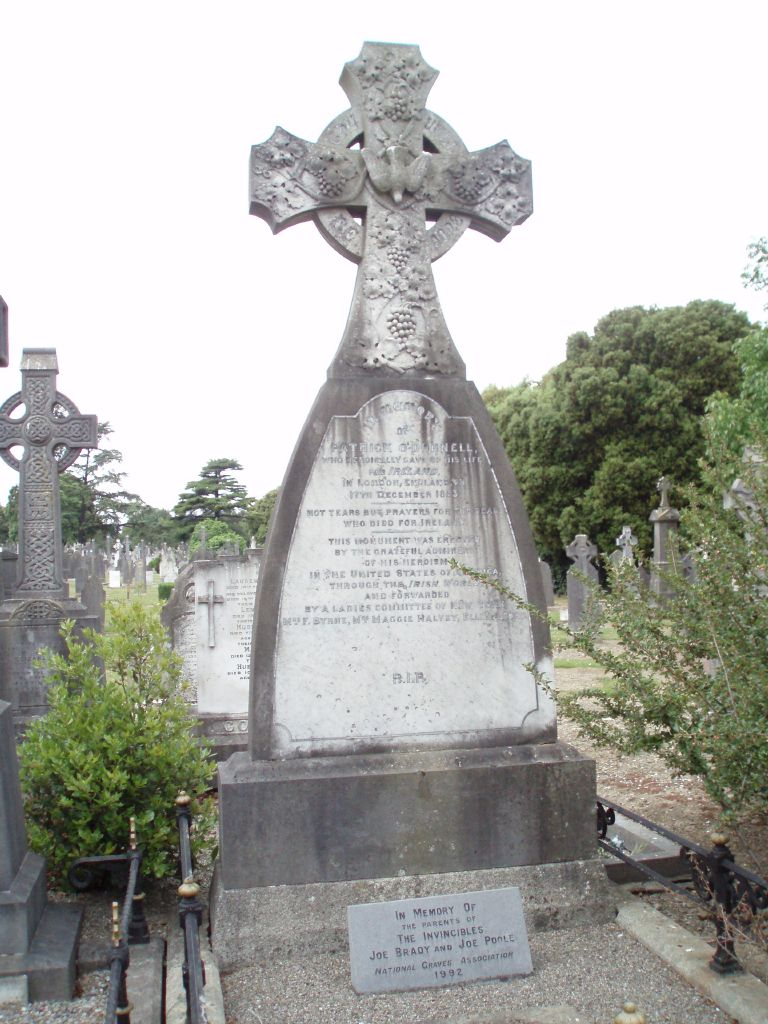
Memorial to Patrick O'Donnell, Glasnevin Cemetery, Dublin

A plaque commemorating O'Donnell's execution stands at his birthplace, Mín an Chladaigh, Gweedore, County Donegal. A huge crowd assembled in Gweedore, on 22 January 1884, to attend a Requiem Mass for the repose of his soul. There followed a mock funeral and an empty coffin was placed in the O'Donnell family burial plot, his followers kneeling in prayer around the grave. Wreaths of immortelles were placed on the coffin which bore the inscription Sacred to the memory of Patrick O'Donnell, executed at London 17 December 1883.

He is mentioned in the folk song Monto (Take Her Up to Monto), "When Carey told on Skin-the-goat/ O'Donnell caught him on the boat".

=== The Celtic Cross ===
A monument was erected in Derrybeg, Gweedore, in 1954 by a Fianna Fáil committee. The committee consisted of 21 local Fianna Fáil cumann members who held fund-raising events to finance the building of the cross. The Cross was officially unveiled by Cormac Breslin, T.D. The monument stands between the former town hall and a pub. The inscription on the cross reads as follows:

I ndíl chuimhe ar Phádraig Ó Domhnaill as paróiste Ghaoth Dobhair a cuireadh chun báis i bpríosún Newgate i Londain ar an 17 Nollaig 1883 de thairbhe a ard dhílseachta d'Éirinn
which translates as:
In memory of Patrick O'Donnell from the parish of Gweedore who was put to death in Newgate Prison in London on 17 December 1883 because of his high loyalty to Ireland.

A memorial in his honour in New York reads "In Memory of Patrick O'Donnell. who heroically gave up his life for Ireland in London, England 17 December 1883. Not tears but prayers for the dead who died for Ireland". O'Donnell's remains were located in the London cemetery by the National Graves Association. All executed prisoners are buried within prison grounds. When Newgate prison closed, the graves were moved.

=== Tribute by the Irish-Americans ===
Several pleas were made for his life by Victor Hugo According to the Freeman's Journal and Daily Commercial Advertiser: "President Chester A. Arthur received a deputation urging him to press for clemency consisting of congressmen Cox and Robinson, New York; Mirrosn, [sic] Springer, and Sinertz, Illinois; Lefevre and Foran, Ohio; Murphy, Iowa; Mabury, William Lamb, Indiana; M'Adoo, New Jersey; Collins, Massachusetts, and O'Neill and Burns, Missouri." The British government protested this plea for clemency and it was denied.

A novel about Patrick O'Donnell has been published with the premise that upon learning of the interventions on his behalf by Victor Hugo, O’Donnell is purported to have written a series of 26 letters to the famous author and humanitarian; letters which never reached their intended recipient but were apparently discovered in 2016 and published in 'The Execution, Life and Times of Patrick O'Donnell'.

In 2022, a newly discovered manuscript of a novel by the important Irish-language writer Séamus Ó Grianna about O'Donnell was published under the title Báire na Fola.
