= William Marwood =

British state hangman (1818-1883)

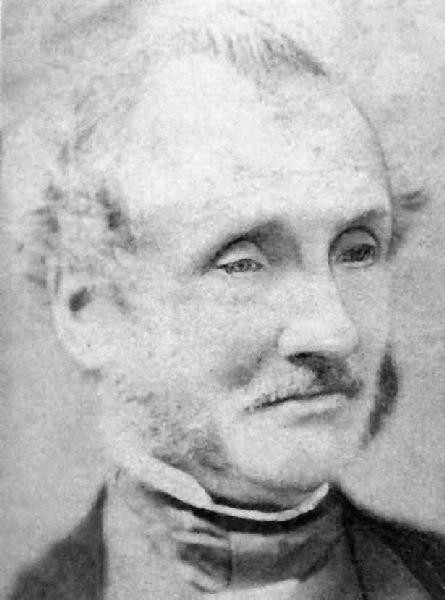
- Born: 1818; Goulceby, Lincolnshire
- Died: 4 September 1883 (aged 64–65); Lincolnshire
- Occupation: Executioner

William Marwood (1818 – 4 September 1883) was a British state hangman. He developed the technique of hanging known as the "long drop".

== Early life ==
Marwood was born in 1818 in the village of Goulceby, the fifth of ten children born to William and Elizabeth Marwood. He was originally a cobbler like his father, of Church Lane, Horncastle, Lincolnshire, England.

In 1852 he appears on the electoral roll as a shoemaker, living in Old Bolingbroke, Lincolnshire. He was married twice: first to a woman named Jessey who died during the 1860s, then to Ellen Andrews (who died aged 55 shortly after Marwood himself).

== Executioner ==
At the age of 54 he persuaded the governor of Lincoln Castle Gaol to allow him to conduct an execution. The efficient way in which he conducted the hanging of William Frederick Horry on 1 April 1872 assisted him in being appointed hangman by the Sheriffs of London and Middlesex in 1874, in succession to William Calcraft, at a retainer of £20 a year plus £10 per execution.

=== The "Long Drop" ===
Marwood developed the "long drop" technique of hanging, which aimed to ensure that the prisoner's neck was broken instantly at the end of the drop, resulting in instantaneous death. This was considered more humane than the slow death by strangulation caused by the "short drop" method, particularly distressing to prison governors and staff who were required to witness executions at close quarters following abolition of public executions by the Capital Punishment Amendment Act 1868.

=== Notable executions ===
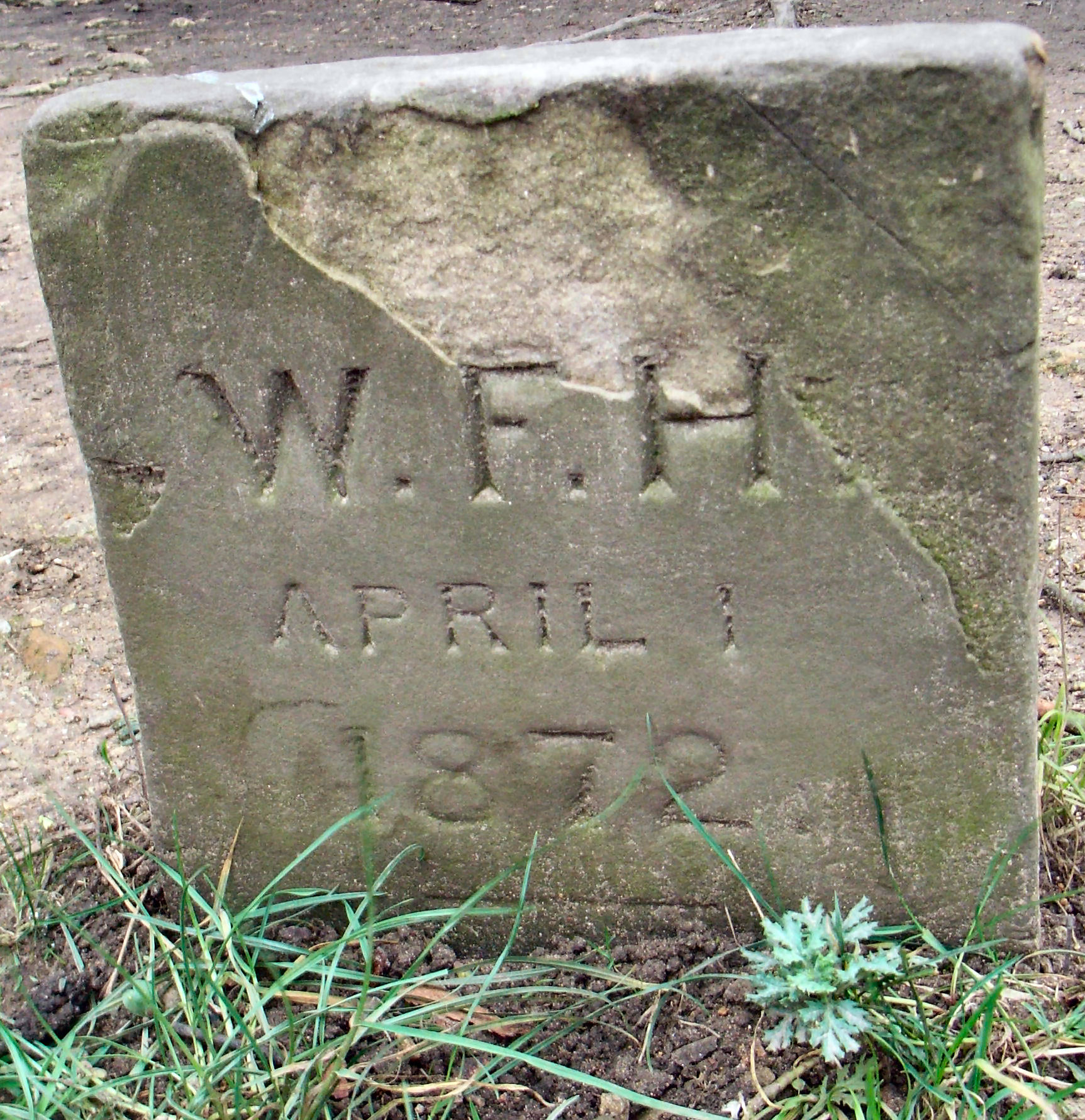
The grave of William Frederick Horry, the first person to be hanged by William Marwood.

In his nine years as a hangman, Marwood hanged 176 people, including:

- William Frederick Horry, the first person to be hanged by William Marwood and the first person to be hanged using the "long drop" method; executed at Lincoln Castle, Lincolnshire on 1 April 1872.
- Henry Wainwright, a brushmaker who murdered his mistress Harriet Lane in September 1874 and buried her body in a warehouse he owned. When declared bankrupt the next year, he disinterred the body (September 1875) and was arrested attempting to rebury it. He was hanged in Newgate on 21 December 1875.
- Selina Wadge, who dropped her disabled two-year-old son down a well. She was hanged at Bodmin Jail on 15 August 1878.
- Charles Peace, the archetypal Victorian burglar and murderer; hanged at Armley Jail, Leeds, Yorkshire, on 25 February 1879. Marwood apparently met Charles Peace on a railway journey a few years before the execution. Peace asked Marwood about his experiences. At the time of the hanging, Marwood reassured Peace he would make it fast and painless with the long drop method.
- Kate Webster, an Irish servant woman who murdered her employer; hanged at Wandsworth Prison, London, on 29 July 1879.
- Charles Shurety who viciously beat his common-law wife's young daughter to death in London; he was executed at Newgate Prison, London on 5 January 1880, after a failed attempt to stop the execution with a forged order from the Home Office.
- Percy Lefroy Mapleton, who murdered Isaac Frederick Gold on a train between London and Brighton for his watch and some coins; Mapleton was arrested almost immediately, but escaped before being arrested again, convicted, and hanged at Lewes on 29 November 1881.
- Dr George Henry Lamson, who poisoned Percy Johns (his crippled brother-in-law) with aconitine at Wimbledon so his wife could inherit some money. Lamson actually returned from France, certain he had covered his tracks; he was tried and convicted, and hanged at Wandsworth Prison on 28 April 1882.
- Maolra Seoighe, convicted, along with six other men, of the murders of five members of the Joyce family in Maamtrasna. He was hanged, alongside two of the other convicted men, on 15 December 1882 in Galway. Seoighe's hanging did not go smoothly as during his vehement protests of innocence, right up to the drop, the rope became disarranged, and he took several minutes to die. Marwood was heard to say ‘bother the fellow’ and to sit at the edge of the scaffold and move the rope back and forward to aid the process. An inquest jury severely censured Marwood for his carelessness. On 4 April 2018 the President of Ireland issued a posthumous pardon for Seoighe due to evidence that he was innocent of the murders.
- Joe Brady and four other members of the Irish National Invincibles gang who murdered Lord Frederick Cavendish, the Chief Secretary for Ireland, and Thomas Henry Burke, the Permanent Under-Secretary for Ireland, with surgical knives in Dublin's Phoenix Park; they were hanged at Kilmainham Jail in Dublin in 1883.

=== Legacy ===
William Marwood influenced James Berry, a retired police officer and friend, to take up the role of hangman. During his time Berry improved upon William Marwood's technique of the long drop.

Examples of his business card as an executioner can now be found in the Guildhall Museum in Boston (18 miles south of Horncastle) and the Crime Museum at New Scotland Yard - the latter was displayed to the public in 2025-2026 at the Metropolitan Police Museum in Sidcup.

Marwood was one of two executioners to give their name to the character of the hangman in the British Punch and Judy puppet show (Jack Ketch being the better known one).

In Marwood's time there was a popular quip as follows:

If Pa killed Ma
Who'd kill Pa?
Marwood.

In the play The Life and Adventurers of Charles Peace (1927) Marwood's role of executioner was played by the former hangman John Ellis.

== Death ==
Marwood died in 1883 from pneumonia and jaundice and was buried at Trinity Church, Horncastle, Lincolnshire.
