= Frank Byrne (Irish nationalist) =

Irish nationalist

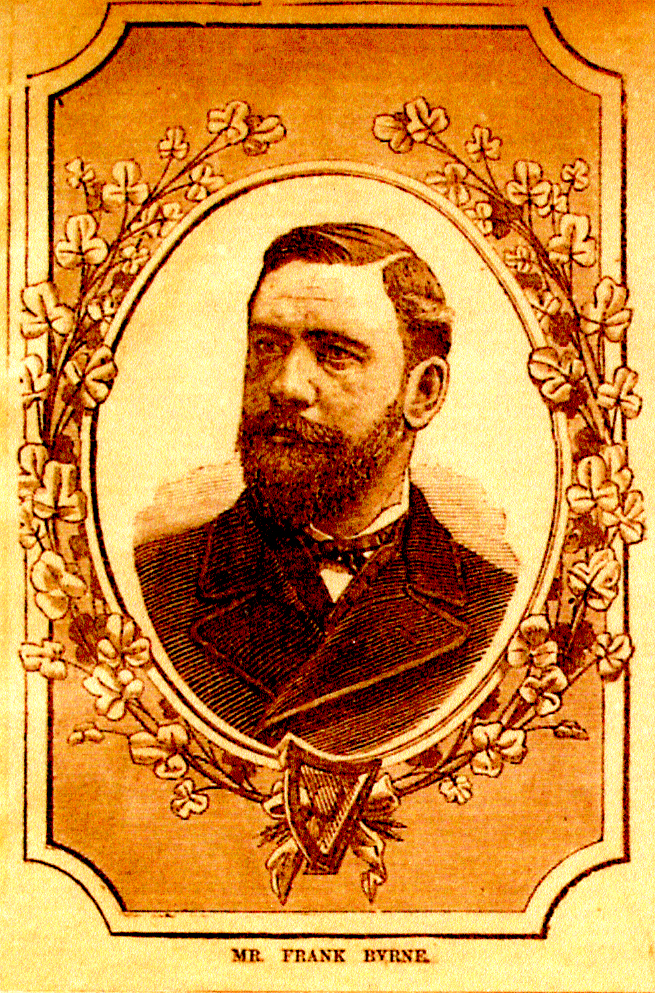
- Born: 9 November 1848; Ireland
- Died: 16 February 1894 (aged 45); Providence, Rhode Island, United States
- Known for: Irish National Invincibles; Irish Republican Brotherhood; Irish National Land League
- Spouse: Mary Ann Moneypenny

Frank Byrne (1848–1894) was an instigator of the Irish National Invincibles, the radical offshoot of the Irish Republican Brotherhood. He was implicated in the assassinations of Lord Frederick Cavendish and Under Secretary Thomas Henry Burke in the Phoenix Park murders of 6 May 1882. He was one of only two who managed to flee Ireland to escape prosecution for the crime; of the remainder, five were executed, others imprisoned, and some turned informants. His escape was the source of much legal wrangling in Ireland, France, and the United States.

== Personal life and career ==
Byrne was born in Ireland in 9 November 1848. He was married to Mary Ann Moneypenny and had two children. Mrs. Byrne's sympathies lay with her husband and she was an active participant his activities.

== Irish patriot ==
Frank Byrne was an aide to Charles Stewart Parnell and secretary of the Irish Home Rule League and the Irish National Land League. Although he was an ardent supporter of the goals of both Irish home rule and the abolishment of landlordism in Ireland, he became much more of a revolutionist and opposed to Parnell's methods of negotiation. After the Coercion Act 1881, designed to quell the Irish farmers, led to the arrest of Parnell, Byrne and a number of like-minded Land Leaguers banded together as the Irish National Invincibles who believed in violent ideas to combat the British administrators.

== Phoenix Park Murders ==
On 6 May 1882 two members of the British Government in Ireland, Chief Secretary for Ireland Lord Frederick Cavendish and the Under-Secretary for Ireland T. H. Burke, were stabbed to death in Phoenix Park, Dublin, by members of the Invincibles. Although twenty-one conspirators were arrested and tried, the leaders of the Invincibles, including Frank Byrne, had not been located or detained. Mrs. Byrne was believed to be the woman who brought to Dublin the surgical knives with which the Phoenix Park murders were committed. She was arrested but subsequently released when she was unable to be identified by the informant James Carey. These knives, it was stated, had been lying for some time in the London offices of the Irish National League of Great Britain.

== Escape ==
After the murders, Byrne escaped to Paris. Parnell was said to have given Byrne £100 to finance the escape, but Parnell continued to deny his involvement in the Invincibles and any of their activities. Byrne was arrested in Paris, but soon released. He had served in an Irish company attached to one of the French regiments in the army under Bourbaki during the Franco-Prussian War and had received several medals for meritorious conduct. He claimed this was the reason for his release.

== Life in America ==
Upon being freed, he immigrated to New York, arriving on 28 March 1883. In New York, Byrne took an active part as a Fenian activist and propagandist. At a meeting in New York on 2 July 1883, he justified the Phoenix Park murders:

"I am not fastidious as to the methods by which the cause of liberty may be advanced. I do not say you should alone use dynamite, or the knife, or the rifle, or parliamentary agitation, but I hold no Irishman true who will not use all and each method as the opportunity presents itself."

Byrne died in Providence, Rhode Island on 16 February 1894, aged 45. His widow died nine months later.
