= James Fitzharris =

Irish assassin in the late 19th century

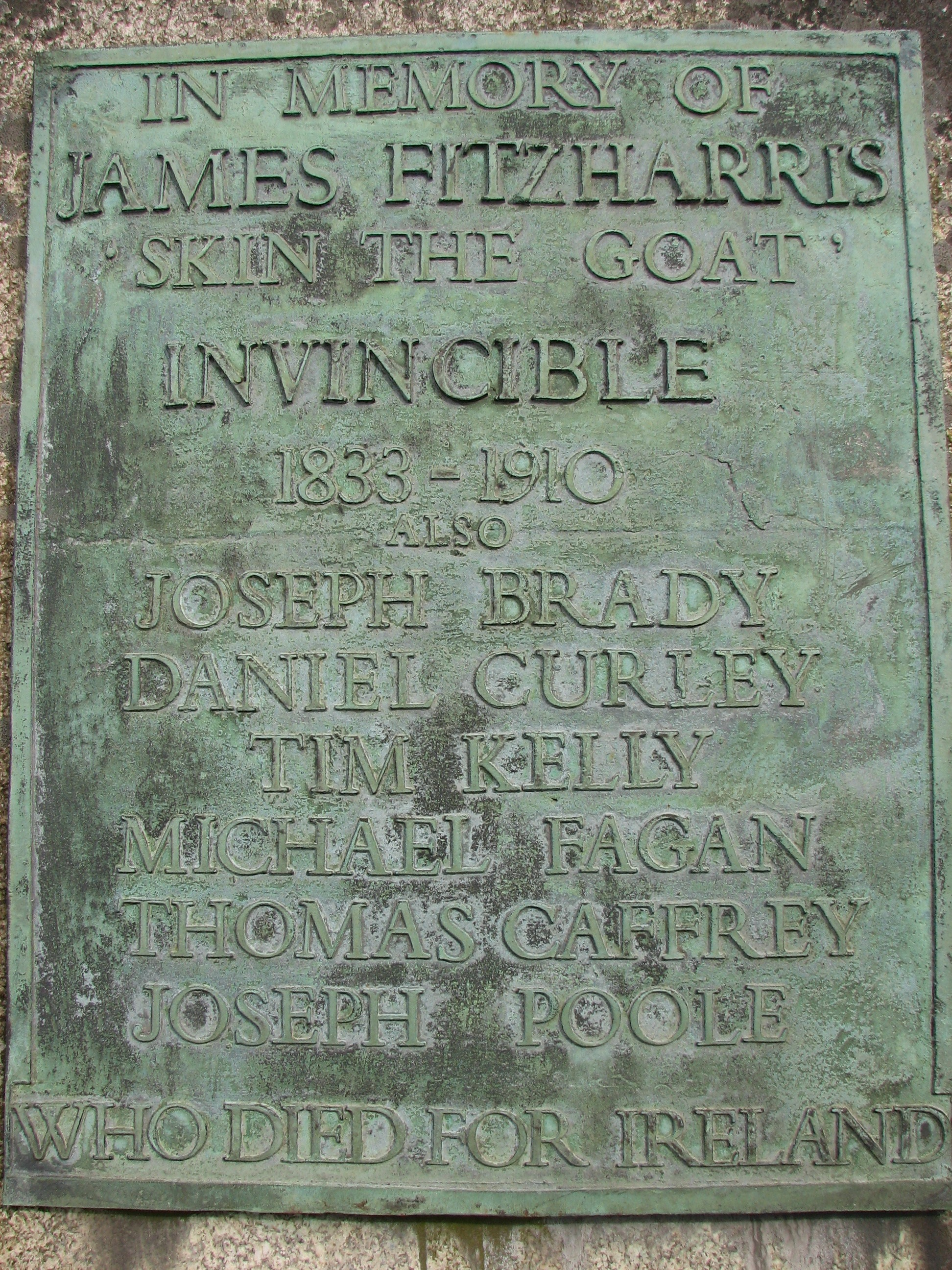
Grave of James Fitzharris (Skin the Goat)

James Fitzharris nicknamed Skin-the-Goat (4 October 1833 – 7 September 1910) was a member of the Invincibles, a Dublin-based Irish revolutionary group.

== Biography ==
Born at Sliabh Bhuí, Ferns, County Wexford, where his father was an employee at the Sinnott estate, he later became an Irish republican.

When working as a cab driver, he earned his nickname when he found a goat eating the horse hair in his horses' collar. Fitzharris killed and skinned the goat on the spot, using the hide to cover his knees when he drove his cab.

Ultimately, he served as getaway driver during the assassination of Permanent Under Secretary Thomas Henry Burke and Lord Frederick Cavendish in Phoenix Park. He was later tried, declaring on the dock that ‘Nobody from Sliabh Bhuí ever turned informer’, and found not guilty of the murders but in a retrial in May 1883, was convicted of conspiracy and accessory to murder and sentenced to penal servitude for life. He was released from prison in 1899 and visited the United States until he was deported back to Ireland in 1900.

He is mentioned in the Irish folk song, "Monto (Take Her Up to Monto)", written by George Desmond Hodnett and popularised by The Dubliners. He is also mentioned in James Joyce's Ulysses (pp. 133-134, 1934 ed.).

FitzHarris died on 7 September 1910, in the South Dublin Union workhouse where he had been living in penury. He is buried in Glasnevin Cemetery. He married twice, first, in 1865, Catherine Costello, with whom he had three children: Andrew, Margaret and Mary, and second, in 1899, Elizabeth Breslin. In 1901 the Fitzharrises were entered in the Census of Ireland at 2 Upper Erne Street.
