= Lucy Cavendish =

English pioneer of women's education (1841–1925)

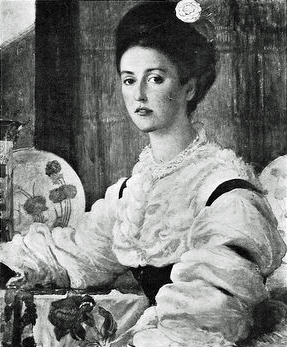
- Cavendish around the time of her marriage
- Born: Lucy Caroline Lyttelton; 5 September 1841; Hagley Hall, Worcestershire, England
- Died: 22 April 1925 (aged 83); Penshurst, Kent, England
- Spouse: Lord Frederick Cavendish (m. 1864; died 1882)
- Father: George Lyttelton, 4th Baron Lyttelton
- Relatives: Lyttelton family

Lucy Caroline Cavendish (née Lyttelton; 5 September 1841 – 22 April 1925), also known as Lady Frederick Cavendish, was an English pioneer of women's education.

A daughter of George Lyttelton, 4th Baron Lyttelton, she married into another aristocratic family, the Cavendishes, in 1864. Eighteen years later her husband, Lord Frederick Cavendish, was murdered in Dublin by Irish republicans (a victim of the Phoenix Park murders). After his death she devoted much of her time to the cause of girls' and women's education, for which she was honoured in her lifetime with an honorary degree, and posthumously when, in 1965, the University of Cambridge named its first postgraduate college for women after her.

== Biography ==
Lucy Lyttelton was born at Hagley Hall in Worcestershire, the second daughter of George Lyttelton, 4th Baron Lyttelton, and his wife, Mary Glynne, whose sister Catherine married William Ewart Gladstone. In 1863 she was appointed a Maid of Honour to Queen Victoria, whom she attended until her marriage the following year.

== Marriage and husband's murder ==
On 7 June 1864 she married Lord Frederick Cavendish, the second son of the Duke of Devonshire. They had no children. Cavendish was elected to Parliament in 1865. In the same year she was excited to join the Ladies Diocesan Association run by Catharine Tait with the prospect of visiting workhouses to try to bridge the gap between the rich and the poor.

Her husband was murdered by Irish republicans on 6 May 1882, the same day he took the oath of office of Chief Secretary for Ireland. Although devastated by the assassination, on the day before the ringleader was hanged she sent him the small gold crucifix she had long worn, as a token of her forgiveness. Gladstone was greatly moved when she told him that she could bear the loss of her beloved husband "if his death were to work good to his fellow-men, which indeed was the whole object of his life." She remained a firm supporter of Irish Home Rule. A window to Lord Frederick's memory was placed in St Margaret's Church, Westminster, at the expense of the members of the House of Commons.

== Later years ==
After her husband's death, Lucy Cavendish was active in the sphere of women's education. She was President of the Yorkshire Ladies Council of Education from 1883 to 1912. She declined the offer of the post of Mistress of Girton College, Cambridge, in 1884. She was a member of the Royal Commission on Secondary Education, one of the first women to serve in that role, and was a founding member of the Council of the Girls' Public Day School Company, which had been founded by her father. On 6 October 1904 she received the honorary degree of Doctor of Laws at the formal inauguration of Leeds University for "notable service to the cause of education".

== Death ==
Lucy Cavendish died on 22 April 1925, aged 83, in her home, the Glebe, in Penshurst, Kent. She was buried with her husband in the Cavendish family churchyard, St Peter's.

== Legacy ==
Lucy Cavendish College, Cambridge, was named in her honour in 1965. She was the great-aunt of one of its founders, Margaret Braithwaite.
