= Henry Wainwright =

English murderer (1832–1875)

Henry Wainwright (12 July 1832 – 21 December 1875) was an English murderer, dubbed the "Whitechapel murderer".

Wainwright was a brushmaker who murdered his mistress Harriet Louisa Lane in September 1874 and buried her body in a warehouse he owned. When he was declared bankrupt the next year, he disinterred the body in September 1875 and attempted to rebury it with the assistance of his brother Thomas and another brushmaker, Alfred Stokes. Stokes was suspicious of the contents of the parcels he had been given to carry, and opened one, revealing human body parts, which he immediately reported to police. Henry and Thomas were tried at the Old Bailey before Sir Alexander Cockburn and found guilty: Henry of murder and Thomas of being an accessory after the fact. Henry Wainwright was sentenced to death and hanged by William Marwood on 21 December 1875 aged 43. Despite taking place after public executions had ended, it is reputed that roughly two hundred people witnessed his execution in prison, testifying to his local notoriety.
