= Yorkshire Ladies' Council of Education =

The Yorkshire Ladies' Council of Education (Note: The apostrophe in "Ladies' " is sometimes omitted, as here on the YLCE website.) (YLCE) is an English charitable institution founded in 1875 to support women's education.

Its current principal activity is the giving of educational grants of £200–£400 to help with course fees for British women over 21 with a place on a course for which they cannot obtain student funding.

== History ==
The Yorkshire Board of Education established a Ladies Committee in 1866, and the Ladies Honorary Council of the Yorkshire Board of Education was founded on 1 January 1871. In 1875 this group became independent of the board and became the Yorkshire Ladies Council of Education. It was incorporated in 1904.

The council was involved in, or supported, the establishment of the Yorkshire School of Cookery (1874), Bradford Girls' Grammar School (1875), Leeds Girls' High School (1876), Yorkshire College of Science (precursor of the University of Leeds, 1878), Wakefield Girls' High School (1878), the West Riding Nursing Association (1907), and several other social work projects including Forest Hill residential home for the elderly, opened in 1960 and now a sheltered housing scheme operated by a separate charity Yorkshire Ladies Council (Hostels) Ltd. Lady Frederick Cavendish was the council's president 1885–1912.

The council's archive is held by West Yorkshire Archive Service. A history of the council was published by the Thoresby Society in 1979.

== Secretarial college ==
The Yorkshire Ladies Secretarial College was founded by the council in 1918 at 7 Cookridge Street, Leeds. It later moved to 18 Blenheim Terrace, opposite the University of Leeds, and closed on 1 January 1988.
