= William Frederick Horry =

British murderer

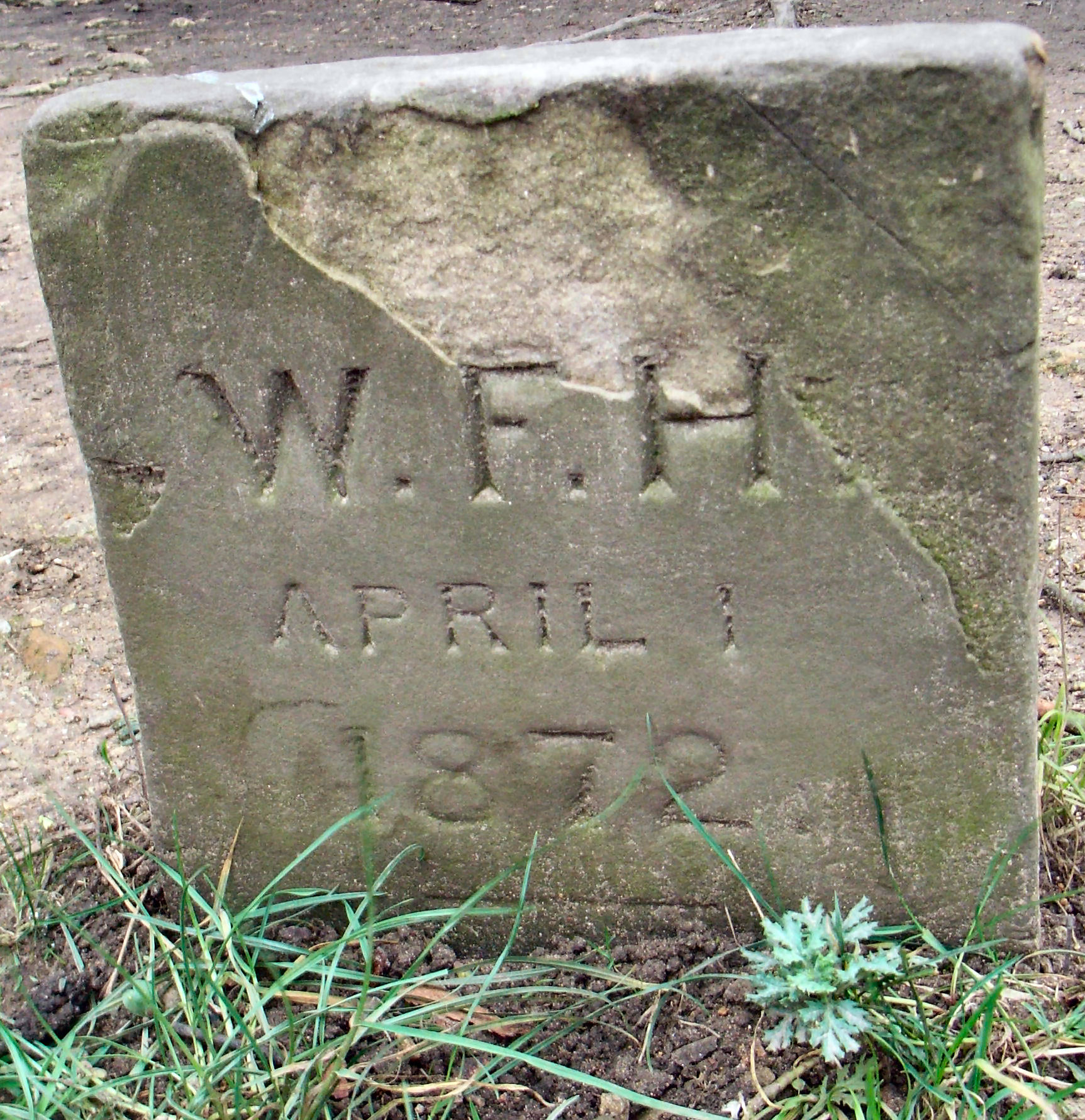
The grave of William Frederick Horry, the first person to be hanged by Victorian hangman William Marwood at Lincoln Castle, 1 April 1872.

William Frederick Horry, also known as Fred Horry (December 1843 – 1 April 1872), was the first person to be hanged by Victorian hangman William Marwood, and the first to fall using the long drop method. He was hanged at Lincoln Castle, Lincoln, England on 1 April 1872, aged 28, for the murder of his wife, Jane Horry.

== Biography and crime ==
Horry was born in December 1843, in Boston, Lincolnshire, England. He married Jane in 1866 and they took over the George Hotel together in Burslem, Staffordshire, England. By September 1871, the two were estranged due to Horry's alcoholism and accusations of Jane's infidelity with customers. Jane went to live with Horry's father in Boston with their children whilst William stayed at the hotel.

William made attempts to visit his family but due to his abusive behaviour, he was barred from further visits. Unable to maintain the business on his own, he sold the hotel and moved to Nottingham. In 1872, William pleaded with his wife a final time to return to him with their children. After being unsuccessful, he travelled to Nottingham, purchased a revolver and ammunition before returning again to Boston to murder his wife.

== Trial and execution ==
At his trial in 1872, he pleaded insanity but the prosecution successfully argued that the crime was premeditated. He was sentenced to death by hanging the following day.

William refused all appeals and was executed by William Marwood on 1 April. William Marwood had never hanged anyone before, but persuaded the authorities in Lincoln to allow him to try a new "long drop" method. The long drop method is designed to snap the condemned person's neck instantly, causing unconsciousness and eventually asphyxiation. It was considered a more humane method than the existing short drop method that had been used for centuries. The execution went without any complications and Marwood went on to hang 176 people.

A memorial to William Frederick Horry exists in Burslem, Staffordshire consisting of a granite obelisk. William is buried in a simple grave in the Lucy Tower of Lincoln Castle. The grave (featuring only the initials of the condemned and the date of death) is well preserved and is still visible, along with many other criminals' graves.

== See also ==
- Official Table of Drops - The long drop method evolved into this standardised method which was used for British hangings until 1964. It is still used in many countries around the world.
