= Lough Mask Murders =

1882 murders in Ireland

Coordinates: 53.554469°N 9.463555°W

The Lough Mask Murders were the murders on 3 January 1882 of Joseph Huddy and his grandson, John Huddy, in the townland of Upper Cloghbrack, County Galway, on the southern shore of Lough Mask in the west of Ireland. Joseph Huddy was the bailiff for Arthur Guinness, Lord Ardilaun, a wealthy Anglo-Irish landlord in a region where the Land War was growing more and more heated. The victims' bodies were weighed down and sunk in the lough itself. The lack of credible witnesses led to four well-publicised trials of the accused in December 1882. For this reason, the execution of three alleged murderers remains controversial

== Disappearance ==
Joseph Huddy, who lived in Creevagh near Cong, had been bailiff and land agent for the Guinness family for over 30 years. On the morning of the murders, Joseph Huddy left home with his 17-year-old nephew to go to Clonbur and Cornamona to serve eviction notices on twelve of Lord Ardilaun's tenant farmers who were engaged in a rent strike. The area was close to land managed by Charles Boycott, eponymous target of the most famous boycott of the Land War. The Huddys began service in the village of Middle Cloghbrack (also known as America) before proceeding to Upper Cloghbrack, a densely populated area with no defined village centre, on the southern shore of Lough Mask.

At 10:00 a.m., the Huddys left Michael Coyne, their driver, where the road intersected with the main road running south to Cornamona. After telling Coyne to meet them in about an hour, by which time they would have served all 12 eviction notices, with the last to be served on Mathias Kerrigan, they set out on foot. When they had not returned by 4:00 p.m., the driver drove on to Cornamona and alerted the Royal Irish Constabulary (RIC). The peelers proceeded to Upper Cloghbrack to look for the missing Huddys.

== Investigation ==
The next day, the police questioned all of the adults of Upper Cloghbrack, but no one revealed any information on the Huddys even though it was known that Huddy and his grandson had gone into Upper Cloghbrack for the purpose of serving ejectment papers the previous day. After tracing the Huddys' movements as far as the house of Mathias Kerrigan, the police found evidence of a struggle in Kerrigan's yard, as well as a mark made by a bullet in the wall of the gable end of Kerrigan's house and bloodstains on the wall. Kerrigan and his sixteen-year-old son Matthew were taken into custody.

For four days, the RIC dug up bogland and searched the mountains without result. Forty crewmen of HMS Banterer, a Royal Navy vessel anchored in Galway Bay, sailed up the River Corrib to Lough Mask. After dragging the lake for 12 days they recovered the decomposing bodies, first John's in a sack and then Joseph's weighted with a rock in his overcoat.

The RIC, now believing that the death of the Huddys was a result of an entire village rising up against the process servers, arrested, in addition to Mathias Kerrigan and his son, fifteen men on suspicion of complicity in the murders. Mathias Kerrigan was detained in Galway City Jail for nine months without being charged. In September 1882, he turned approver, that is, an informer, and named three men as responsible for the killings. Michael Flynn and Thomas Higgins of Middle Cloghbrack and Patrick Higgins (Long) of Upper Cloghbrack were charged with the murders.

Upon his arrest, the prosecution focused heavily on Flynn's prominent role within the regional agrarian movement. Records from the Dublin December Commission show that the Crown recovered a membership card for the Clonbur branch of the Land League along with strategic correspondence addressed to Flynn directly from the central headquarters of the Ladies' Irish National Land League in Dublin. Because the prominent male leaders of the movement—including Charles Stewart Parnell and Michael Davitt—were imprisoned by the state at the time, the executive administration had been taken over by the women of the League, who used local organisers like Flynn to coordinate resistance across Connacht.

== Legal process and executions ==
In four separate trials, one ending in a hung jury, all three men were found guilty and sentenced to death by Judge William O'Brien. .

During the Dublin December Commission of 1882, the Solicitor-General explicitly weaponised Flynn’s education to frame him as a dangerous political supervisor. The prosecution argued to the jury that because Flynn was a "tolerably educated man" who could "speak, read, and write English fluently" in a heavily monoglot, Irish-speaking region, he had naturally assumed the "position of a sort of leader of the people in the district" and acted as a "man of leading amongst his neighbours."

Historical reviews of the case emphasize that Her Majesty's Government (HMG) treated the regional unrest not as a simple tenants' dispute, but as an existential threat to the empire. The prosecution utilized the emergency provisions of the Prevention of Crimes Act 1882 to keep key figures isolated on rolling remand warrants without trial for months. While records show this mechanism successfully broke Mathias Kerrigan after nine months in custody, Flynn maintained his innocence throughout his detention and trial, refusing to sign depositions linking the national executive to local violence. He, along with Patrick Higgins and Thomas Higgins, was hanged in Galway City Jail in January 1883.

Descendants of Patrick and Thomas Higgins and Michael Flynn vigorously maintain the innocence of these men.

== Popular media ==
The historical novel, Part an Irishman ISBN 153713986X by TS Flynn is dedicated to Michael Flynn's memory.
