= Phoenix Park Murders =

1882 stabbings in Dublin

- Location: 53.35737°N 6.319411°W; Phoenix Park, Dublin, Ireland
- Date: 6 May 1882; 144 years ago 5:30pm (UTC±00:00)
- Target: Thomas Henry Burke
- Attack type: Stabbing assassination
- Weapon: Surgical knives
- Deaths: Thomas Henry Burke; Lord Frederick Cavendish
- Perpetrator: Irish National Invincibles
- Assailants: James Carey, Joe Brady, Tim Kelly, and co-conspirators
- Motive: Irish nationalism

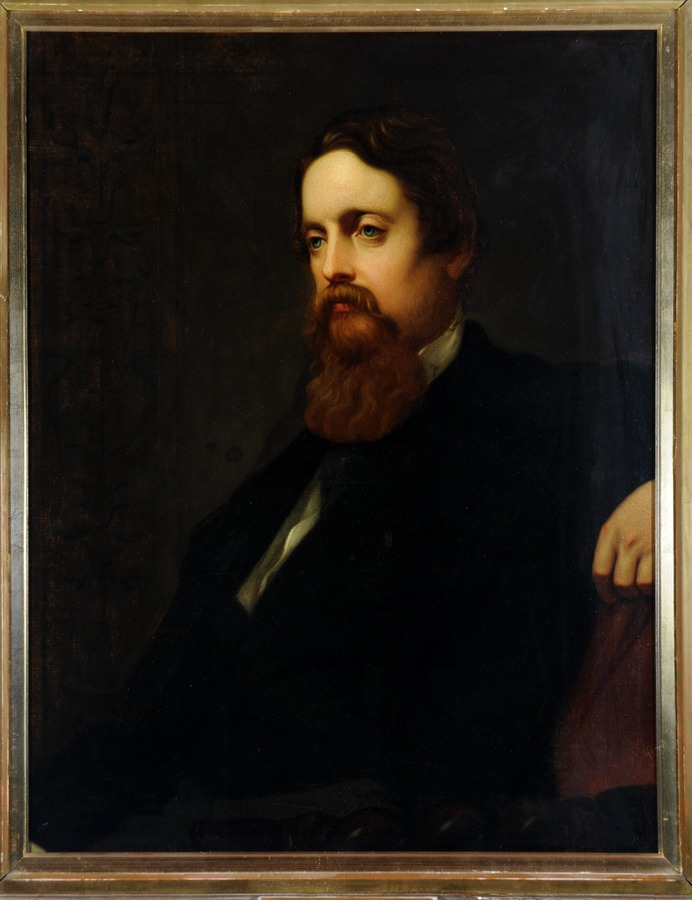
Lord Frederick Cavendish

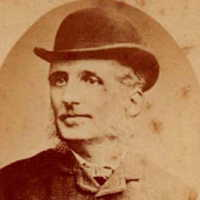
Thomas Henry Burke

The Phoenix Park Murders were the fatal stabbings of Lord Frederick Cavendish and Thomas Henry Burke in Phoenix Park, Dublin, Ireland, on 6 May 1882. Cavendish was the newly appointed Chief Secretary for Ireland and Burke was the Permanent Under-Secretary, the most senior Irish civil servant. The assassination was carried out by members of a republican organisation known as the Irish National Invincibles, a more radical breakaway from the Irish Republican Brotherhood.

== Murders ==
The Irish National Invincibles failed numerous times to kill Chief Secretary William Edward Forster before he resigned his office in protest at the Kilmainham Treaty. The group then settled on a plan to kill the Permanent Under-Secretary Thomas Henry Burke at the Irish Office. Newly installed Chief Secretary Lord Frederick Cavendish, on the evening of his arrival to Ireland, decided to walk alone from Dublin Castle to his new residence in The Phoenix Park. Close to the entrance of Dublin Zoo, Burke, who just happened to also be on his way home to his residence in The Phoenix Park, spotted Cavendish and asked his carriage driver to stop and then continued on foot with Cavendish to the Viceregal Lodge, the "out of season" residence of the Lord Lieutenant of Ireland.

The Invincibles had been following Burke for a number of days previous to this. Seven members of The Invincibles approached Burke and Cavendish. The first assassination was committed by Joe Brady, who stabbed Burke with a 12-inch knife, followed in short order by Tim Kelly, who stabbed Cavendish. Both men used surgical knives, delivered by Mary Ann Byrne, in order to avoid making a lot of noise while carrying out the killings. As previously mentioned, Cavendish had just arrived in Ireland that day so these men were completely unaware of his identity and he was not the intended target, however as he was now a witness to the assassination he could not be left alive. Thomas Myles, resident surgeon at the nearby Dr Steevens' Hospital, was summoned to render medical assistance to the victims.

The Lord Lieutenant, Lord Spencer, described hearing screams before witnessing a man running to the Lodge grounds shouting, "Lord Frederick Cavendish and Mr. Burke are killed!" The assailants were driven away in a cab by James Fitzharris, known as "Skin-the-Goat", who served as a getaway driver.

== Investigation ==
The hunt for the perpetrators was led by Superintendent John Mallon, a Catholic who came from Armagh. Mallon had a shrewd idea of who was involved, suspecting a number of former Fenian activists. A large number of suspects were arrested and kept in prison, claiming they were connected with other crimes. By playing off one suspect against another, Mallon got several of them to reveal what they knew.

The case was successfully prosecuted by the Attorney General, Solicitor General James Murphy QC (later Mr Justice Murphy), and Peter O’Brien, before Justice William O’Brien. Invincibles' leader James Carey, Michael Kavanagh and Joe Hanlon agreed to testify against the others. Joe Brady, Michael Fagan, Thomas Caffrey, Dan Curley and Tim Kelly were convicted of the murders, and were hanged by William Marwood in Kilmainham Gaol in Dublin between 14 May and 9 June 1883. Others, convicted as accessories to the crime, were sentenced to serve long prison terms. Fitzharris was acquitted of murder but retried as an accessory and convicted.

Only the case of Kelly gave any real difficulty. He was 19 and generally said to look much younger, and by referring to him as "a child", his defence counsel created enough unease for two juries to disagree. Only after an unprecedented third trial was he found guilty.

== Implications ==
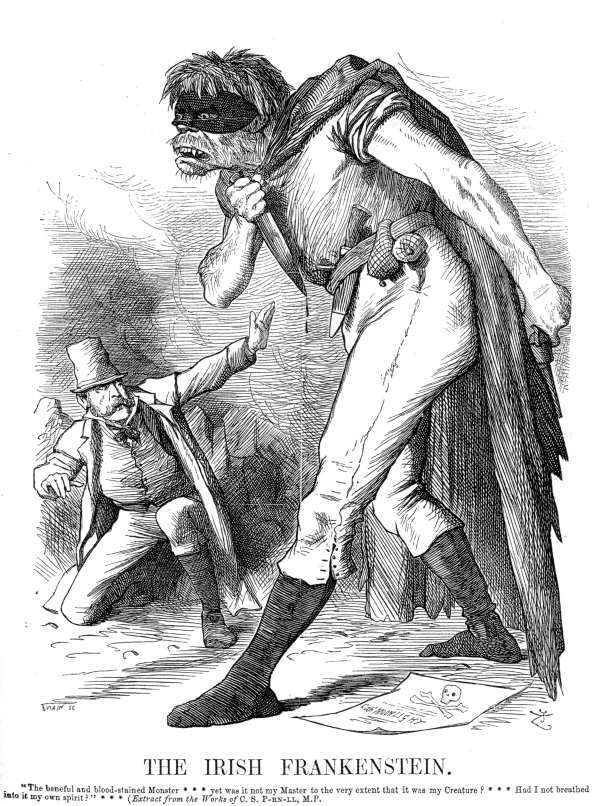
Punch magazine depicts the Fenian movement as Frankenstein's monster to Charles Parnell's Frankenstein, in the wake of the Phoenix Park Murders.

Charles Stewart Parnell's policy of allying his Irish Parliamentary Party to Prime Minister William Ewart Gladstone's Liberal Party in 1886 to enable Home Rule was undone by the murders. Gladstone's Minister Lord Hartington, the elder brother of Lord Cavendish, split with Gladstone on the Home Rule bills of 1886 and 1893 and led the breakaway Liberal Unionist Association, which allied itself to Lord Salisbury's Conservative governments. In the ensuing 1886 general election the Conservatives and Liberal Unionists swept the board. This delayed Home Rule by twenty-eight years until the Government of Ireland Act 1914, which was technically passed but was never effected.

== Reaction ==
Parnell made a speech condemning the murders in 1882, increasing his already huge popularity in both Britain and Ireland. He had just enabled some reforms under the Kilmainham Treaty four days before the murders. Parnell's reputation increased in Ireland, being seen as a more moderate reformer who would never excuse such tactics.

In March 1887, The Times printed letters purportedly from Parnell claiming sympathy with the murderers and that his public denunciation of them was insincere. It emerged that the letters were forgeries written by the journalist Richard Pigott, and Parnell was personally vindicated by the Parnell Commission in 1888–89.

== Memorial ==
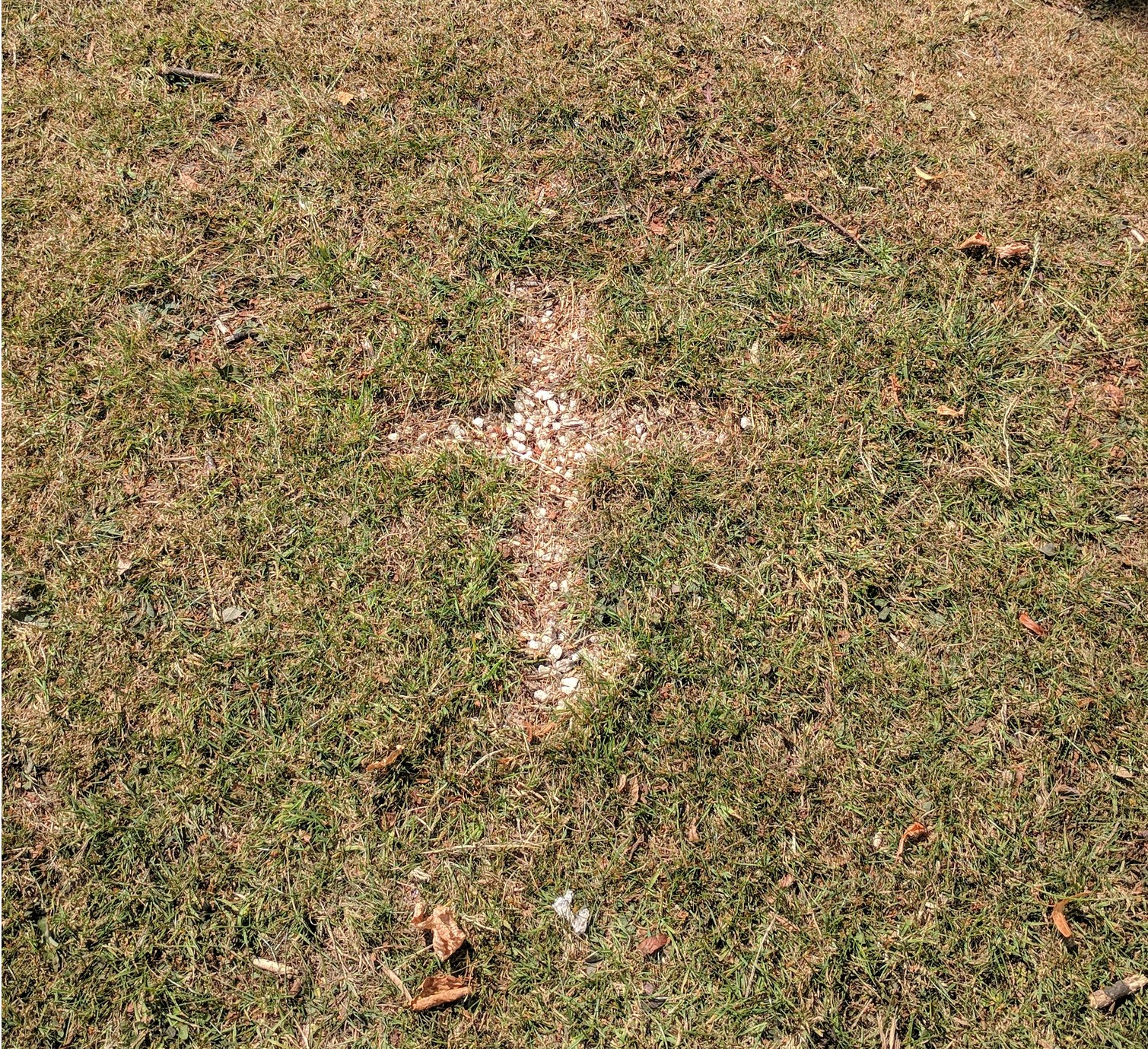
Memorial Cross

There is a cross cut into the grass at the location of the killings. It is 60 centimetres (24 in) long, filled with a small amount of gravel and cut thinly.

== Bibliography ==
- Molony, Senan (2006). The Phoenix Park Murders: Conspiracy, Betrayal and Retribution. Dublin: Mercier Press. ISBN 1-85635-511-X.
- Corfe, Tom (1968). The Phoenix Park Murders: Conflict, Compromise and Tragedy in Ireland, 1879–1882. Hodder & Stoughton. ISBN 978-0-34002-624-3.
- Lyons, F. S. L. (1977). Charles Stewart Parnell. Great Britain: Fontana. ISBN 0-00-635324-X.
