= George Desmond Hodnett =

George Desmond "Hoddy" Hodnett (25 February 1918 – 23 September 1990) was an Irish musician, songwriter and long-time jazz and popular music critic for the Irish Times.

== Life ==
Hodnett was born in Dublin, Ireland. His father, who came from a prominent Youghal, County Cork legal family, became, after the Irish War of Independence in 1922, a colonel in the Irish Army. His mother, Lauré Faschnacht, came from Murten, Switzerland.

He was educated at the Catholic University School (Leeson Street, Dublin) and at Coláiste na Rinne at An Rinn, County Waterford. He studied law at Trinity College, Dublin but preferred the music and theatres of the city to a legal career. He played jazz piano, trumpet and zither (he was probably the only zither-player in Ireland at the time). He became part of the bohemian milieu that congregated around the Catacombs in Fitzwilliam Place, which included Brendan Behan and Gainor Crist (the original Ginger Man).

In the 1950s, Hodnett was composing satirical tunes for revues at the Pike Theatre in Herbert Lane (where he was also the residential pianist) and for other Dublin theatres. After folk and Irish traditional music became popular he reviewed this music. He continued reviewing jazz and Irish trad music for the Irish Times until shortly before his death.

In 1969 he took part in the occupation of Georgian buildings in Hume Street (which became known as the Battle of Hume Street). He sustained injuries when being forcibly removed.

His best-known song was "Monto (Take Her Up To Monto)", which savagely mocks the state of Ireland and the city of Dublin during the Victorian era. It was composed for a revue in 1958. Ronnie Drew of The Dubliners knew of the song and sang it at the Gate Theatre in 1966, where it was an immediate hit.
