= James Carey (Fenian) =

Irish Fenian and informer

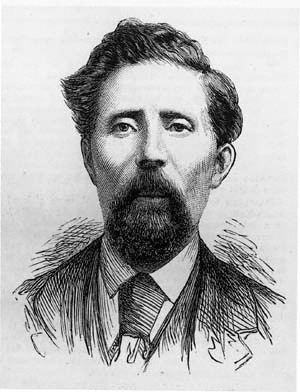
James Carey, by unknown engraver, published 1883

James Carey (1845–1883) was a Fenian, most notable for his involvement in the Phoenix Park Murders. He has been called "the most militant-minded republican you could possibly meet" by historian Dr Shane Kenna.

== Early life and nationalism ==
Carey was the son of Francis Carey, a bricklayer, who came from Celbridge to Dublin, where his son was born in James's Street in 1845. James also became a bricklayer, and for 18 years continued in the employment of Michael Meade, builder, of Dublin; he then started business on his own account as a builder in that city, at Denzille Street. In that venture, he was successful; he became the leading spokesman of his trade, and obtained several large building contracts.

During all this period Carey was engaged in an Irish nationalist conspiracy, but to outward appearance, he was one of the rising men of Dublin. He was involved in religious and other societies and at one time was spoken of as a possible lord mayor. In 1882 he was elected a town councillor.

In about 1861 he joined the Irish Republican Brotherhood (IRB), and soon afterwards became its treasurer. He broke with the IRB in 1881, forming a new group which assumed the title of the Invincibles, and established their headquarters in Dublin. Carey took an oath as one of the leaders. The object of the Invincibles was to remove all "tyrants" from the country, and several attempts, but without success, were made to assassinate The Lord Lieutenant of Ireland Francis Cowper, 7th Earl Cowper and then Chief Secretary for Ireland W. E. Forster.

== Phoenix Park Murders and aftermath ==
No. 1, the secret head of the association, then gave orders to kill Thomas Henry Burke, the under-secretary to the Lord Lieutenant of Ireland. On 6 May 1882, nine of the conspirators proceeded to the Phoenix Park, where Carey, while sitting on a jaunting car, pointed out Burke to the others, who at once attacked and killed him with knives, and at the same time also killed Lord Frederick Cavendish, the newly appointed Chief Secretary, who was not a target but happened to be walking with Burke.

For eight months no clue could be found to the perpetrators of the act; but on 13 January 1883, Carey was arrested and, with 16 other people, charged with a conspiracy to murder public officials. When arrested, he was erecting a mortuary chapel in the South Dublin Union, and the work was then carried on by his brother Peter Carey. On 13 February, Carey turned queen's evidence and betrayed the complete details of the Invincibles and of the killers in the Phoenix Park. His evidence – together with that of another informer, the getaway driver Michael Kavanagh – resulted in the execution by hanging of five of his former associates.

With his life in great danger, he was secretly, with his wife and family, put on board the Kinfauns Castle, bound for the Cape, and sailed on 6 July under the name of Power. On board the same ship was Patrick O'Donnell, a bricklayer. He became friendly with Carey, without knowing who he was. After stopping off in Cape Town, he was informed by chance of the real identity of Carey. He continued with Carey on board the Melrose for the voyage from Cape Town to Natal, and when the vessel was 12 miles off Cape Vaccas, on 29 July 1883, using a pistol he had in his luggage, shot Carey dead.

O'Donnell was brought to England and tried for murder, was found guilty and hanged at Newgate Prison on 17 December 1883.

== Personal life ==
He married Margaret (Maggie) McKenny by whom he had several children.
