= Monto (Take Her Up to Monto) =

Irish folk song by George Desmond Hodnett

Song
- Language: English
- Written: 1958
- Genre: Irish traditional
- Songwriter: George Desmond Hodnett
- Producer: Brian Masterson

"Monto (Take Her Up To Monto)" is an Irish folk song, written in 1958 by George Desmond Hodnett, music critic of the Irish Times, and popularised by the Dubliners from 1966 onward. Frank Harte was also known to sing the song. It refers to Monto, the historic red light district in the northeast of Dublin, which had not existed for decades when the song was written.

It contains many historical references to Dublin in the late 19th century, including William Edward "Buckshot" Forster, the Second Boer War, the Linenhall, Queen Victoria, the Irish National Invincibles. (The lines about the Tsar of Russia and King of Prussia visiting the Phoenix Park in a hot air balloon are fictional.)

Irish singer Róisín Murphy named her 2016 album Take Her Up to Monto in reference to the song.
