= Irish National Invincibles =

Irish 19th century assassins

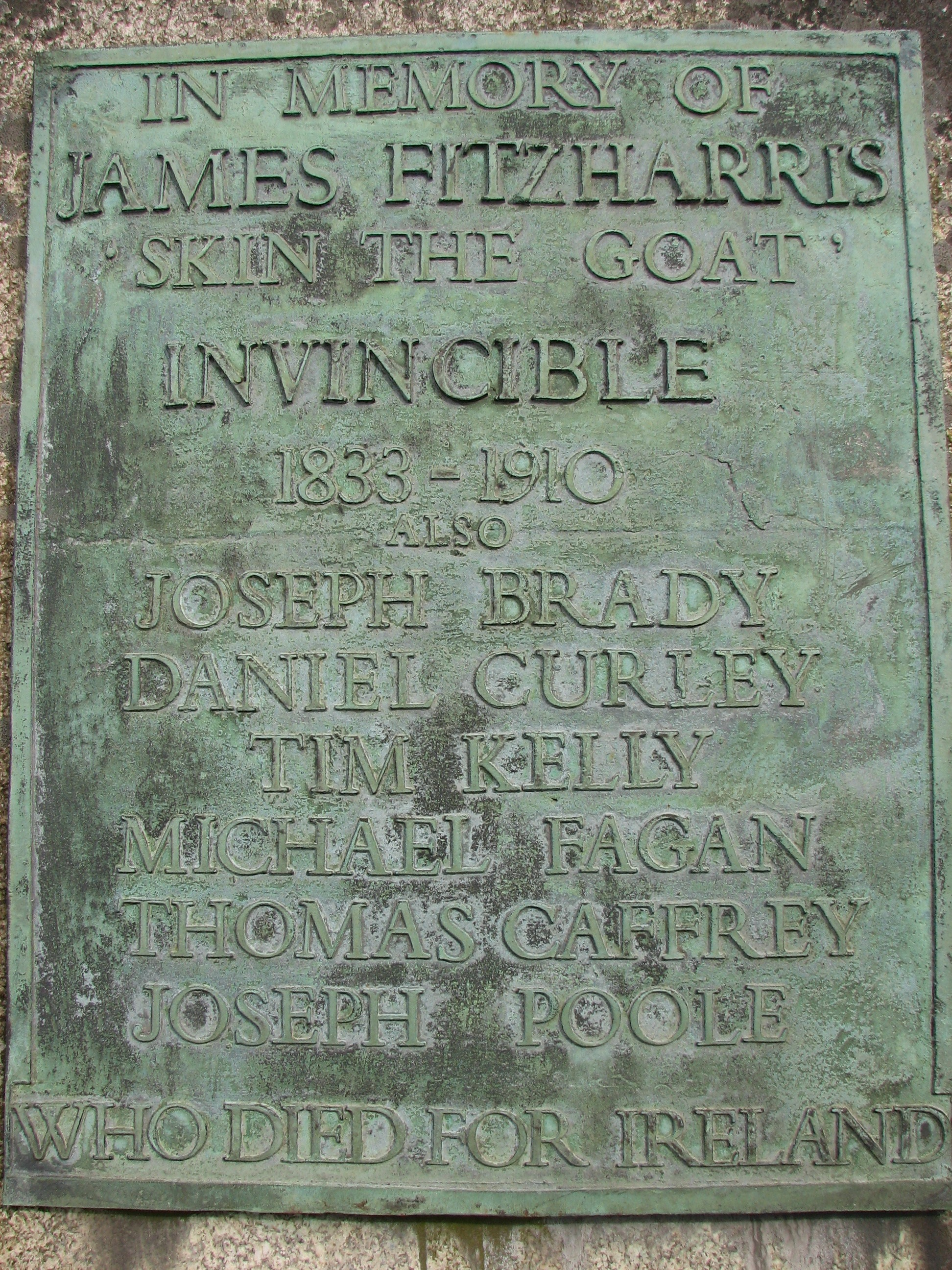
- Grave of James Fitzharris (Skin the Goat)
- Other name: Invincibles
- Leader: James Carey
- Dates active: 1881–1883
- Split from: Irish Republican Brotherhood
- Country: Ireland
- Headquarters: Dublin
- Ideology: Irish nationalism

The Irish National Invincibles, usually known as the Invincibles, were a militant organisation based in Ireland active from 1881 to 1883. Founded as splinter group of the Irish Republican Brotherhood, the group had a more radical agenda, and was formed with an intent to target those who implemented English policies in Ireland.

== Phoenix Park Murders ==
After numerous attempts on his life, Chief Secretary for Ireland William Edward Forster resigned in protest of the Kilmainham Treaty. The Invincibles settled on a plan to kill the Permanent Under Secretary Thomas Henry Burke at the Irish Office. The newly installed Chief Secretary for Ireland, Lord Frederick Cavendish, was walking with Burke on the day of his arrival in Ireland when they struck, in Phoenix Park, Dublin, at 17:30 on 6 May 1882. Joe Brady attacked Burke, followed in short order by Tim Kelly, who knifed Cavendish. Both men used surgical knives.

A large number of suspects were arrested and interrogated by the Dublin Metropolitan Police (DMP). By playing off one suspect against another, Superintendent Mallon of the DMP's G Division got several of them to reveal what they knew. The Invincibles' leader, James Carey, and Michael Kavanagh agreed to testify against the others. Joe Brady, Michael Fagan, Thomas Caffrey, Dan Curley and Tim Kelly were hanged by William Marwood in Kilmainham Gaol in Dublin between 14 May and 4 June 1883. Others were sentenced to long prison terms. No member of the founding executive, however, was ever brought to trial by the British government. John Walsh, Patrick Egan, John Sheridan, Frank Byrne, and Patrick Tynan fled to the United States.

== Aftermath ==
Carey was shot dead on board Melrose off Cape Town, South Africa, on 29 July 1883, by County Donegal man Patrick O'Donnell, for giving evidence against his former comrades. O'Donnell was apprehended and escorted back to London, where he was convicted of murder at the Old Bailey and hanged on 17 December 1883.

A novel about Patrick O'Donnell has been published with the premise that upon learning of the interventions on his behalf by Victor Hugo, O’Donnell is purported to have written a series of 26 letters to the famous author and humanitarian; letters which never reached their intended recipient but were apparently discovered in 2016 and published in 'The Execution, Life and Times of Patrick O'Donnell'. It casts doubt on O'Donnell's motives for the murder of Carey.

== In literature and song ==
In Episode Seven of James Joyce's Ulysses, Stephen Dedalus and other characters discuss the assassinations in the offices of the Freeman newspaper. In Episode Sixteen Bloom and Dedalus stop in a cabman's shelter run by a man they believe to be James 'Skin-the-Goat' Fitzharris.

The Invincibles and Carey are mentioned in the folk song "Monto (Take Her Up To Monto)":

When Carey told on Skin-the-goat,
O'Donnell caught him on the boat
He wished he'd never been afloat, the filthy skite.
Twasn't very sensible
To tell on the Invincibles
They stood up for their principles, day and night by going up to Monto Monto......"
