= Lord Frederick Cavendish =

British politician (1836–1882)

The Right Honourable Lord Frederick Cavendish
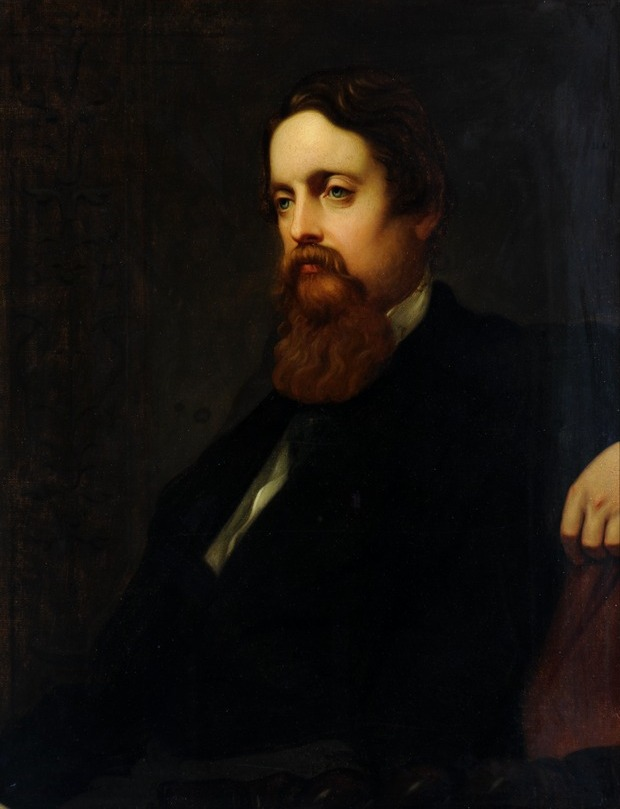
- 1883 copy by John D. Miller after a 1874 William Blake Richmond portrait of Cavendish

Chief Secretary for Ireland
- In office 6 May 1882
- Monarch: Victoria
- Prime Minister: William Ewart Gladstone
- Preceded by: William Edward Forster
- Succeeded by: George Trevelyan

Personal details
- Born: 30 November 1836 Compton Place, Eastbourne, Sussex, England
- Died: 6 May 1882 (aged 45) Phoenix Park, Dublin, Ireland
- Cause of death: Assassination by stabbing
- Resting place: St Peter's Church, Derbyshire
- Party: Liberal
- Spouse: Hon. Lucy Lyttelton (m. 1864)
- Parents: William Cavendish, 7th Duke of Devonshire; Lady Blanche Howard
- Relatives: George Lyttelton (father-in-law)
- Education: Trinity College, Cambridge

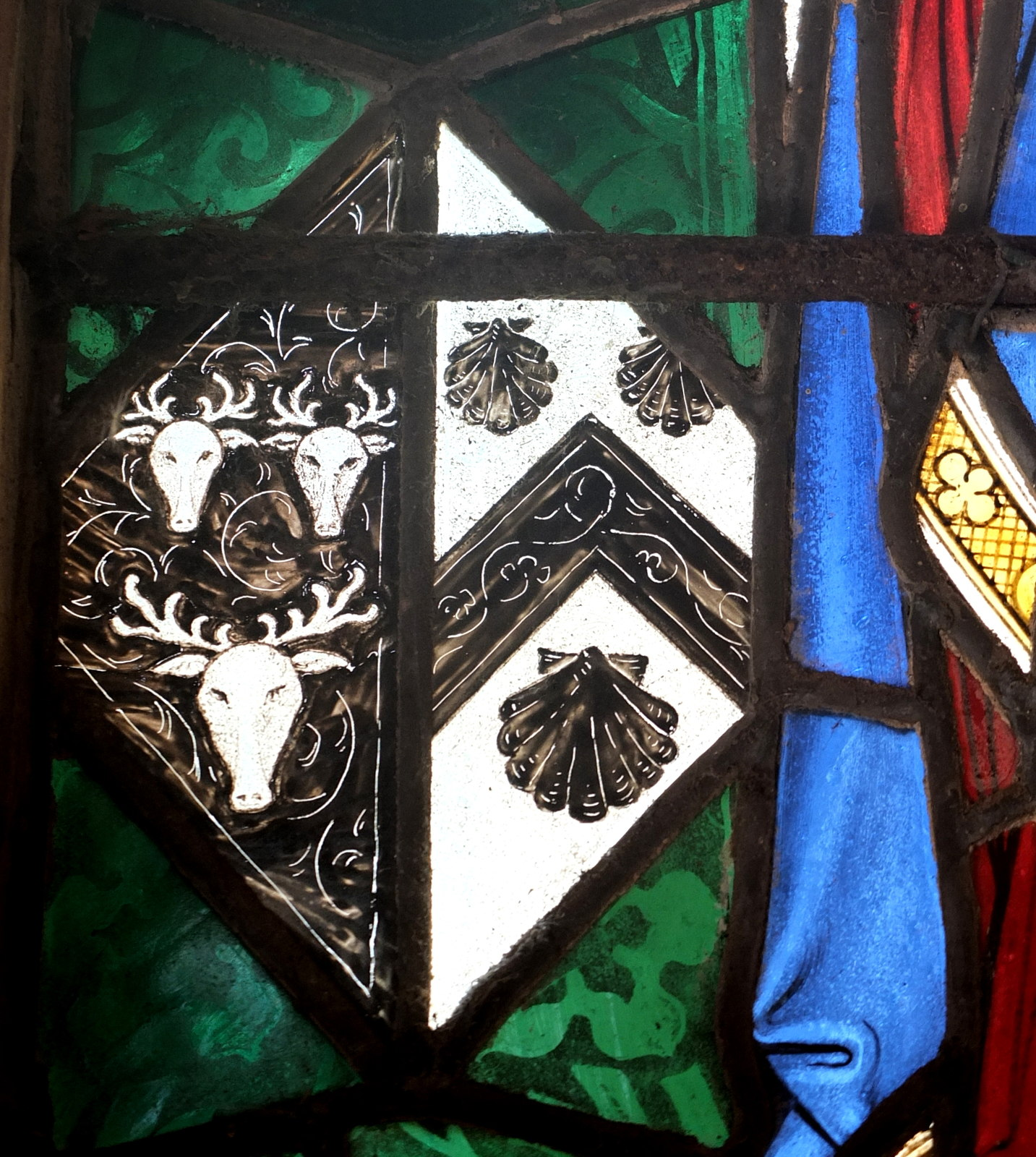
Cavendish impaling Lyttelton, funeral hatchment of Lucy Lyttelton, wife of Lord Frederick Charles Cavendish, St Deiniol's Church, Hawarden, Flintshire, Wales

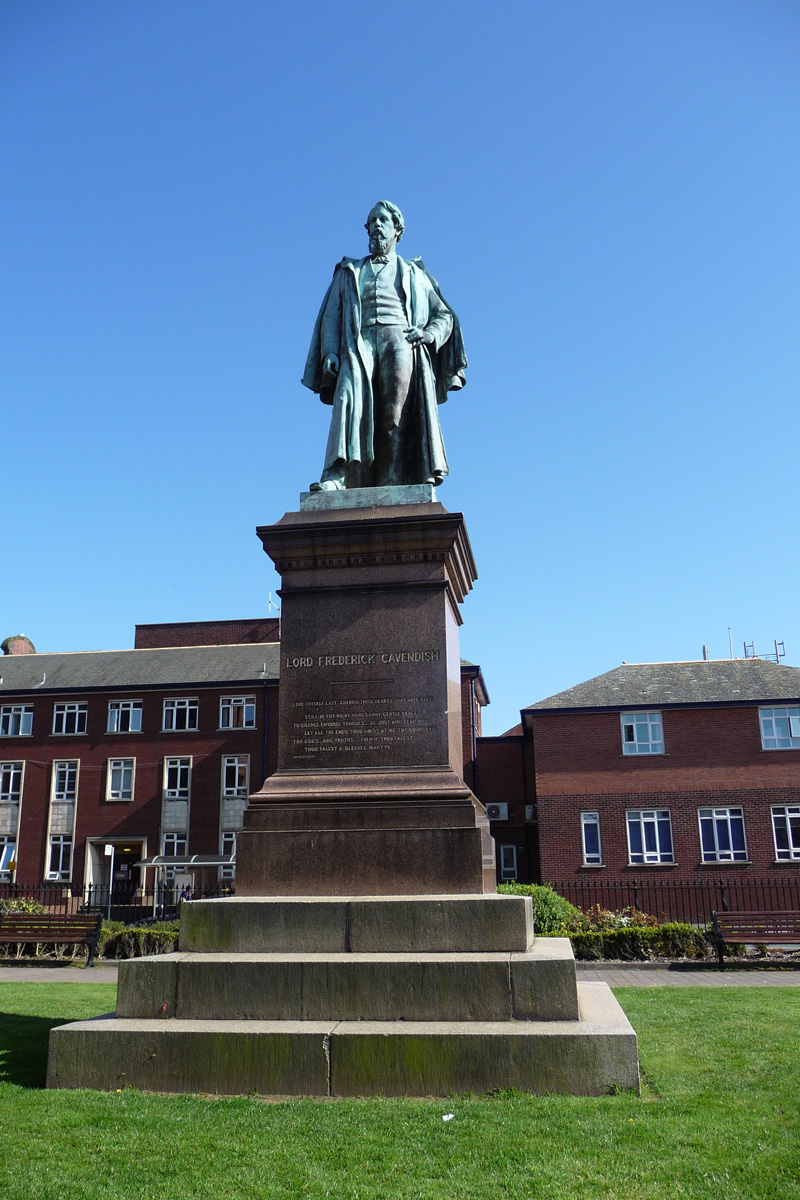
Statue in Barrow-in-Furness

Lord Frederick Charles Cavendish (Note: As the son of an earl whom he predeceased, Cavendish did not himself hold a noble title, but was entitled to the style of "Lord" as a courtesy.) (30 November 1836 – 6 May 1882) was a British Liberal politician and protégé of the Prime Minister, William Ewart Gladstone. Cavendish was appointed Chief Secretary for Ireland in May 1882 but was killed along with Thomas Henry Burke in what came to be known as the Phoenix Park Murders only hours after his arrival in Dublin, a victim of the Irish National Invincibles organisation.

== Background and education ==
Born at Compton Place, Eastbourne, Sussex, Cavendish was the second son of the 7th Duke of Devonshire by his wife, Lady Blanche Howard, fourth daughter of the 6th Earl of Carlisle, and the brother of the Marquess of Hartington, later 8th Duke of Devonshire, who had also been Chief Secretary for Ireland. Cavendish, after being educated at home, matriculated in 1855 at Trinity College, Cambridge, where he graduated B.A. in 1858, and then served as a cornet with the Duke of Lancaster's Own Yeomanry cavalry.

== Political career ==
From 1859 to 1864, Cavendish was private secretary to Lord Granville. He travelled in the United States during 1859 and 1860, and in Spain in 1860. He was elected to the House of Commons as a Liberal for the Northern Division of the West Riding of Yorkshire, 15 July 1865, and retained that office until his death. After serving as private secretary to the prime minister, William Ewart Gladstone, from July 1872 to August 1873 he became a junior Lord of the Treasury, and held office until the resignation of the ministry. He was Financial Secretary to the Treasury from April 1880 to May 1882, when soon after the resignation of William Edward Forster, Chief Secretary for Ireland, he was appointed to succeed him.

== Death ==
In company with the 5th Earl Spencer, the then Lord Lieutenant of Ireland, he proceeded to Dublin, and took the oath as Chief Secretary at Dublin Castle, on 6 May 1882; but on the afternoon of the same day, while walking in the Phoenix Park in company with Thomas Henry Burke, the Permanent Under-Secretary, he was assassinated by members of the militant Irish nationalist splinter group known as the Irish National Invincibles. Using scalpels and surgical blades, the participants stabbed Lord Frederick and Burke multiple times from behind in an incident that came to be known as the Phoenix Park killings.

=== Burial ===
His remains were returned to England and buried in the churchyard of St Peter's Church, Edensor, near Chatsworth, on 11 May, where 300 members of the House of Commons and 30,000 other persons followed to the side of the grave.

=== Trial ===
The trial of the murderers in 1883 (see James Carey) made it evident that the death of Cavendish was not premeditated, and that he was not recognised by the assassins; the plot was against Burke, and Cavendish was murdered because he happened to be in the company of Burke.

== Family ==
On 7 June 1864, Cavendish married Lucy Caroline Lyttelton, second daughter of the 4th Baron Lyttelton, granddaughter of Sir Stephen Glynne and niece of William Ewart Gladstone's wife Catherine. She was a maid of honour to the Queen.

A statue of Cavendish can be found in the plaza behind the town hall in Barrow-in-Furness in Cumbria (formerly and historically in Lancashire), where his father invested heavily in local industries. A window in memory of Cavendish was placed in St Margaret's Church, Westminster, at the cost of the members of the House of Commons. His imposing white Carrara marble tomb can be seen in Cartmel Priory, Cumbria. Cavendish was a council member of Yorkshire College, Leeds, which after his death established the Cavendish Chair of Physics. There is also a memorial fountain to him at Bolton Abbey.

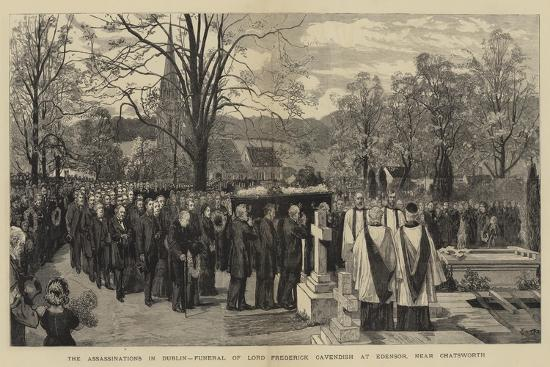
The funeral of Lord Frederick Charles Cavendish in St Peter's Churchyard, Edensor

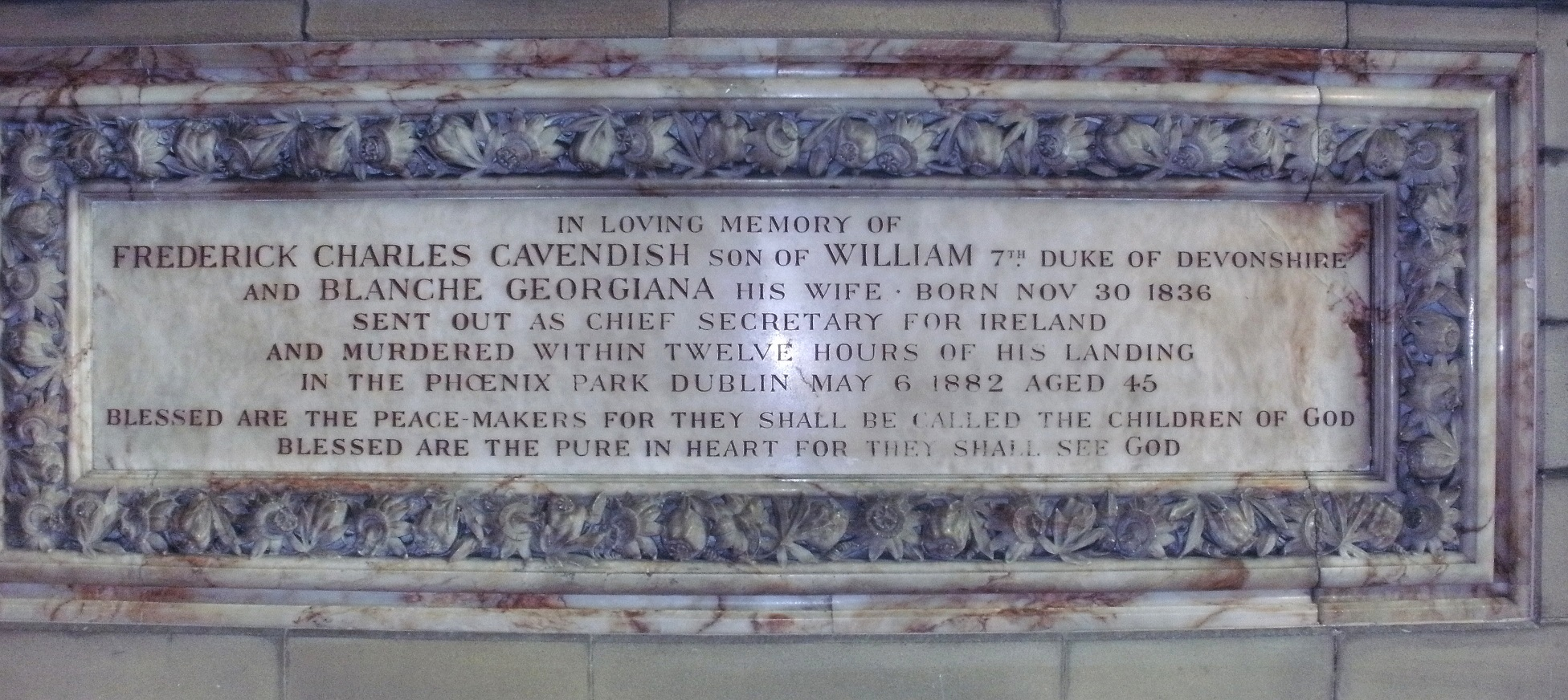
St Peter's Church, Edensor - Memorial to Lord Frederick Charles Cavendish

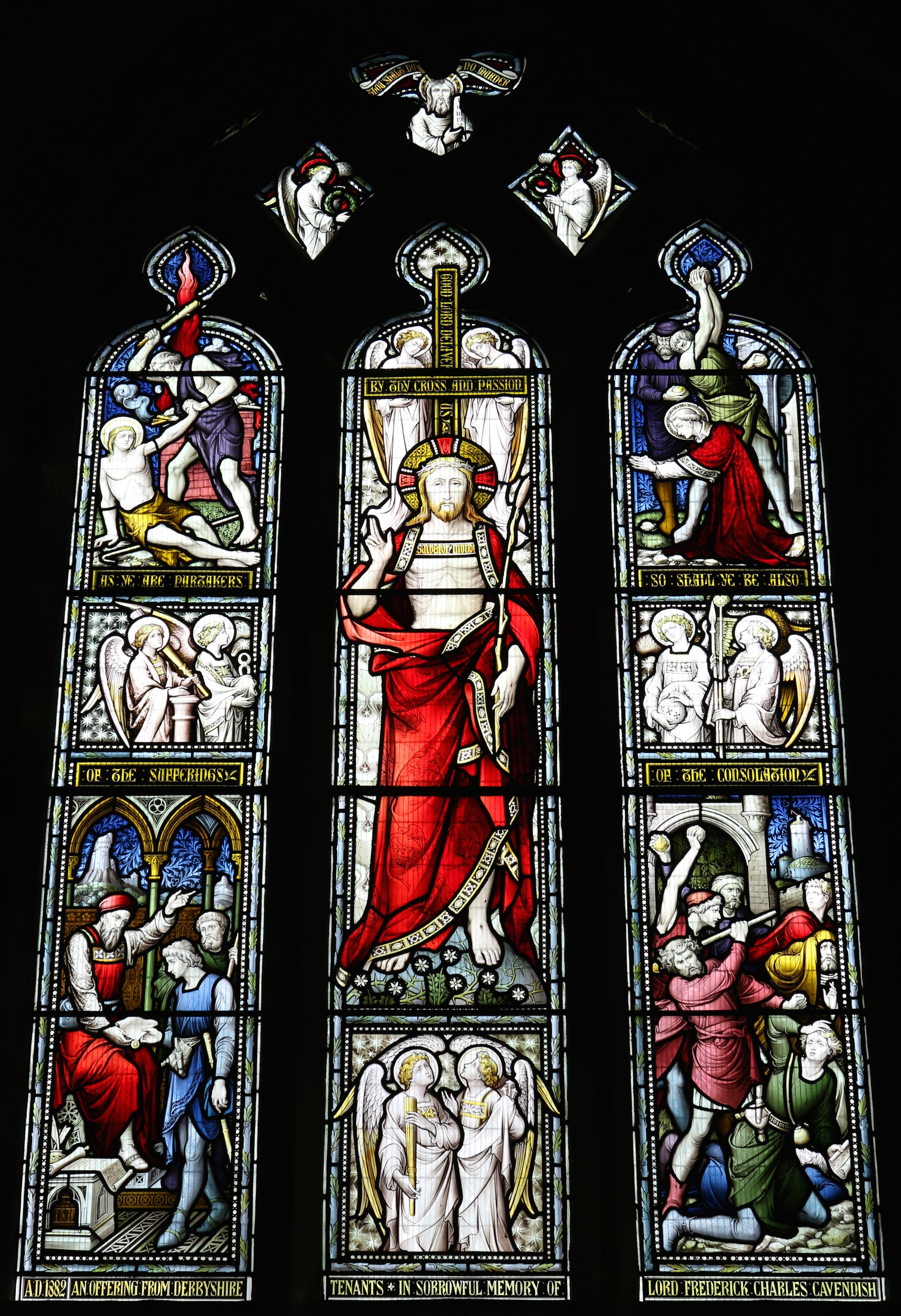
Window erected in his memory in St Peter's Church, Edensor made by Hardman & Co. in 1882

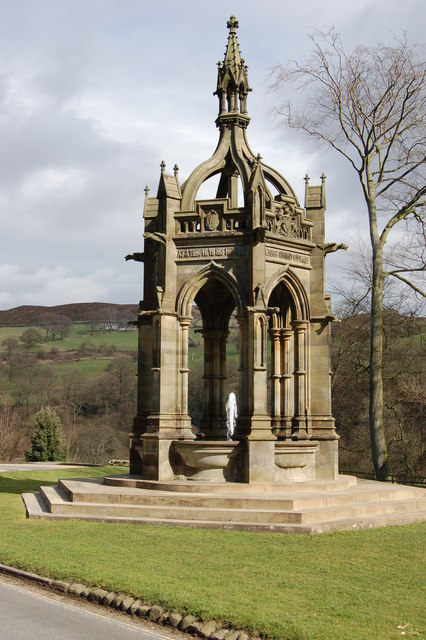
The memorial to Cavendish at Bolton Abbey

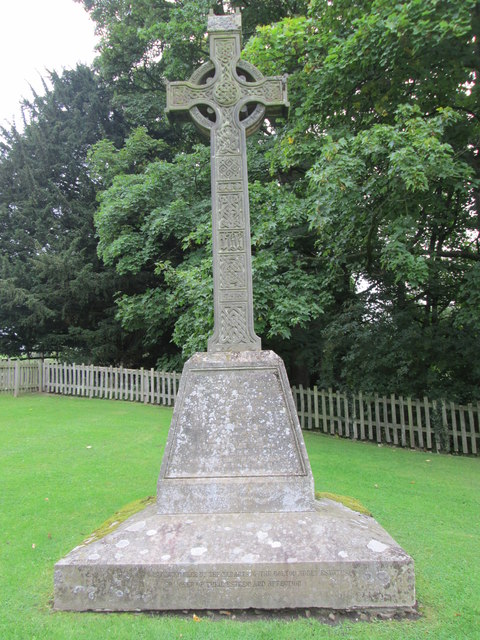
Memorial to Cavendish at Bolton Abbey erected by tenants of the Estate

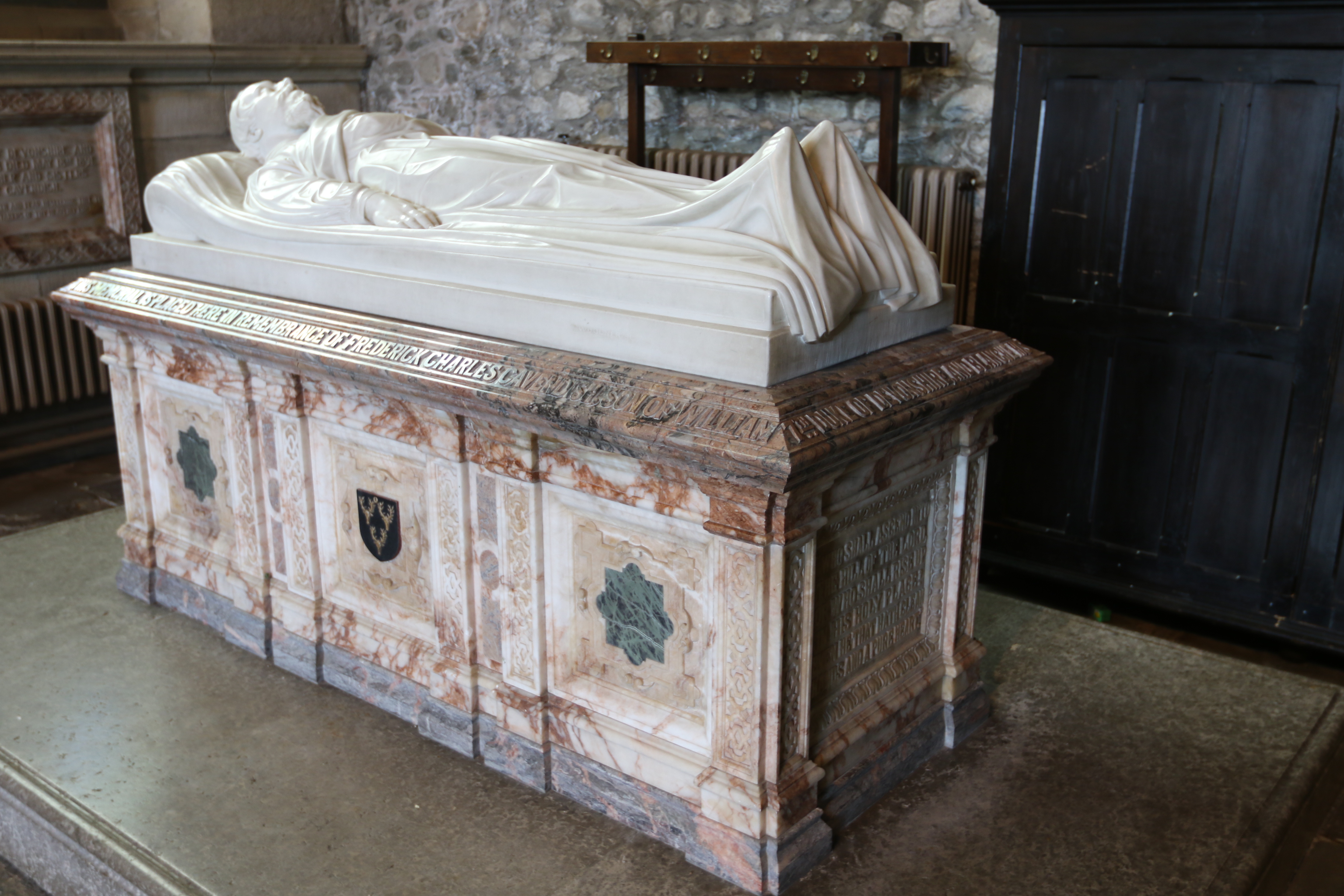
Carrara marble memorial in Cartmel Priory

== Ancestry ==
Ancestors of Lord Frederick Cavendish

8. George Cavendish, 1st Earl of Burlington
4. William Cavendish
9. Elizabeth Compton
2. William Cavendish, 7th Duke of Devonshire
10. Cornelius O'Callaghan, 1st Baron Lismore
5. Louisa O'Callaghan
11. Frances Ponsonby
1. Frederick Cavendish
12. Frederick Howard, 5th Earl of Carlisle
6. George Howard, 6th Earl of Carlisle
13. Margaret Caroline Leveson-Gower
3. Blanche Georgiana Howard
14. William Cavendish, 5th Duke of Devonshire
7. Georgiana Cavendish
15. Georgiana Spencer

== Notes ==
Parliament of the United Kingdom
New constituency	Member of Parliament for West Riding of Yorkshire North; 1865–1882; With: Sir Francis Crossley, Bt 1865–1872; Francis Sharp Powell 1872–1874; Sir Mathew Wilson, Bt 1874–1882	Succeeded by Sir Mathew Wilson, Bt; Isaac Holden
Political offices
Preceded by Sir Henry Selwin-Ibbetson, Bt	Financial Secretary to the Treasury; 1880–1882	Succeeded by Leonard Courtney
Preceded by William Edward Forster	Chief Secretary for Ireland; 1882	Succeeded by George Trevelyan
