= Thomas Henry Burke (civil servant) =

Irish civil servant (1829–1882)

Thomas H. Burke
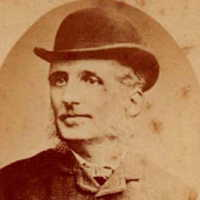

Under-Secretary for Ireland
- In office 1869 – 1882
- Preceded by: Sir Edward Robert Wetherall
- Succeeded by: Robert George Crookshank Hamilton

Personal details
- Born: Thomas Henry Burke; 29 May 1829
- Died: 6 May 1882 (aged 52) Phoenix Park, Dublin
- Resting place: Prospect Cemetery, Glasnevin
- Parents: William Burke; Emma Dillon
- Relatives: Sir Theobald Burke (brother); Augustus Nicholas Burke (brother)
- Occupation: Civil Servant
- Known for: Phoenix Park Murders

Thomas Henry Burke (29 May 1829 – 6 May 1882) was an Irish civil servant who served as Permanent Under Secretary at the Irish Office for many years before being assassinated during the Phoenix Park Murders on Saturday 6 May 1882. The assassination was carried out by an Irish republican organisation known as the Irish National Invincibles.

The newly appointed Chief Secretary for Ireland, Lord Frederick Cavendish, although not the intended victim, was assassinated alongside him while they walked through Phoenix Park in Dublin. The victims were stabbed in the neck and chest with surgical blades.

Burke was the Invincibles' intended target because he had been working for the Dublin Castle administration as head of the Civil Service for many years and was a supporter of the Irish Coercion Acts during the Land War. Irish nationalists referred to Burke as the "Castle rat".

== Life ==
Thomas Henry Burke was one of six sons of William Burke of Knocknagur, Tuam, County Galway and Emma Dillon. He was born in Waterslade House, Tuam. He was educated at Oscott College, Sutton Coldfield, near Birmingham, and also in Belgium and Germany.

Burke's family was descended from that of Sir Ulick Burke, 1st Bt of Glinsk, County Galway, on whom Charles I conferred a baronetcy in 1628. One brother was Sir Theobald Hubert Burke, 13th Baronet of Glinsk, another brother was the artist Augustus Nicholas Burke.

== Burke's outlook ==
Burke was in favour of both Home Rule and reform of land issues, although as a civil servant he did not make his views known publicly. Lord Spencer described him as a "warm-hearted Irishman of strong national tendencies". Burke's support of various Crimes Acts imposed in Ireland was an issue which marked him out for assassination. Burke supported the retention of the unpopular Act in 1882, though his position was somewhat soft.

...those who have had opportunity to be well informed have always held that Mr. Burke confined himself within the immediate duties of his post, and that he was rather averse then otherwise to coercion...in the opinion of a great many people he has for a long time been the real ruler of the country".

Burke's attitude towards land issues was demonstrated by his intervention on the Kirwan estate in Carraroe, County Galway in 1880. Numerous eviction notices were about to be served on tenants and the chances of confrontation were high. Burke used his personal acquaintance with the Kirwans to attempt to defuse the situation. Burke's report to Forster lamented the

sad flood of light this throws on the Irish land question ... an absentee landlord, careless sub-agents, fraudulent bailiffs and a wretched tenantry.

== Funeral and interment ==
Burke was interred in a private ceremony at Prospect Cemetery, Glasnevin on Tuesday 9 May 1882. The grave is situated at Plot Zb 74 & 75. His remains were removed from the Chief Secretary's Lodge at 9 am, by hearse, followed by 43 carriages containing mourners. The coffin bearing the inscription, "Thomas Henry Burke, Born 29th May 1829, Died 6th May 1882, R.I.P." The Very Rev. Monsignor Lee, Dean of Dublin officiated, assisted by the Rev. E.J. Quinn and Rev. W.J. Hurley. Thomas Burke was laid to rest beside his father William, under a Celtic cross. The ornamental carved stone cover of the grave bears the inscription, "Sacred to the memory of Thomas Henry Burke Esq. Who was murdered in the Phoenix Park on May 6th, 1882. He pleased God and was beloved".

The second monument, composed mainly of black marble from Cong erected adjacent to the grave, bears the inscription,

To the memory of Thomas Henry Burke, Under Secretary to the Lord Lieutenant of Ireland. Assassinated in the Phoenix Park. This monument is erected by his many friends among the Irish Resident Magistrates as a mark of their appreciation of his high character and eminent public service. RIP.

Thomas' estate at death was £1901 11s. 4d. according to probate records of 7 June 1882.

== Gallery ==
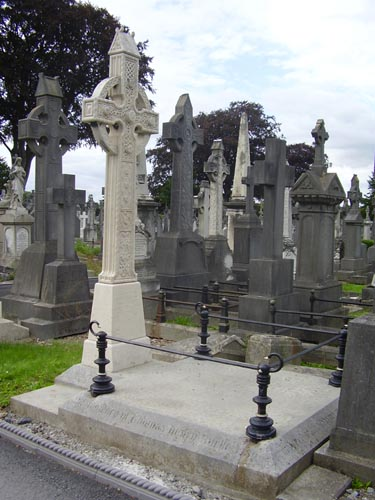
Thomas Burke's grave, Prospect cemetery, Glasnevin.

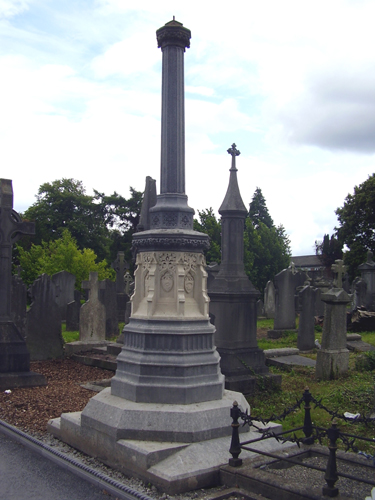
Monument dedicated to Burke from the Resident Magistrates.

== Memorial Prize ==
The Department of Education in Northern Ireland administers the Burke Memorial Fund which was established in 1883, a trust fund from which the payment of an annual prize of £150 is awarded to the best entrant to GCSE examinations taken in Northern Ireland.

== See also ==
- House of Burgh, an Anglo-Norman and Hiberno-Norman dynasty founded in 1193

Government offices
Preceded by Sir Edward Robert Wetherall	Under-Secretary for Ireland; 1869–1882	Succeeded by Robert George Crookshank Hamilton
