= Political union =

Union of smaller states or governments

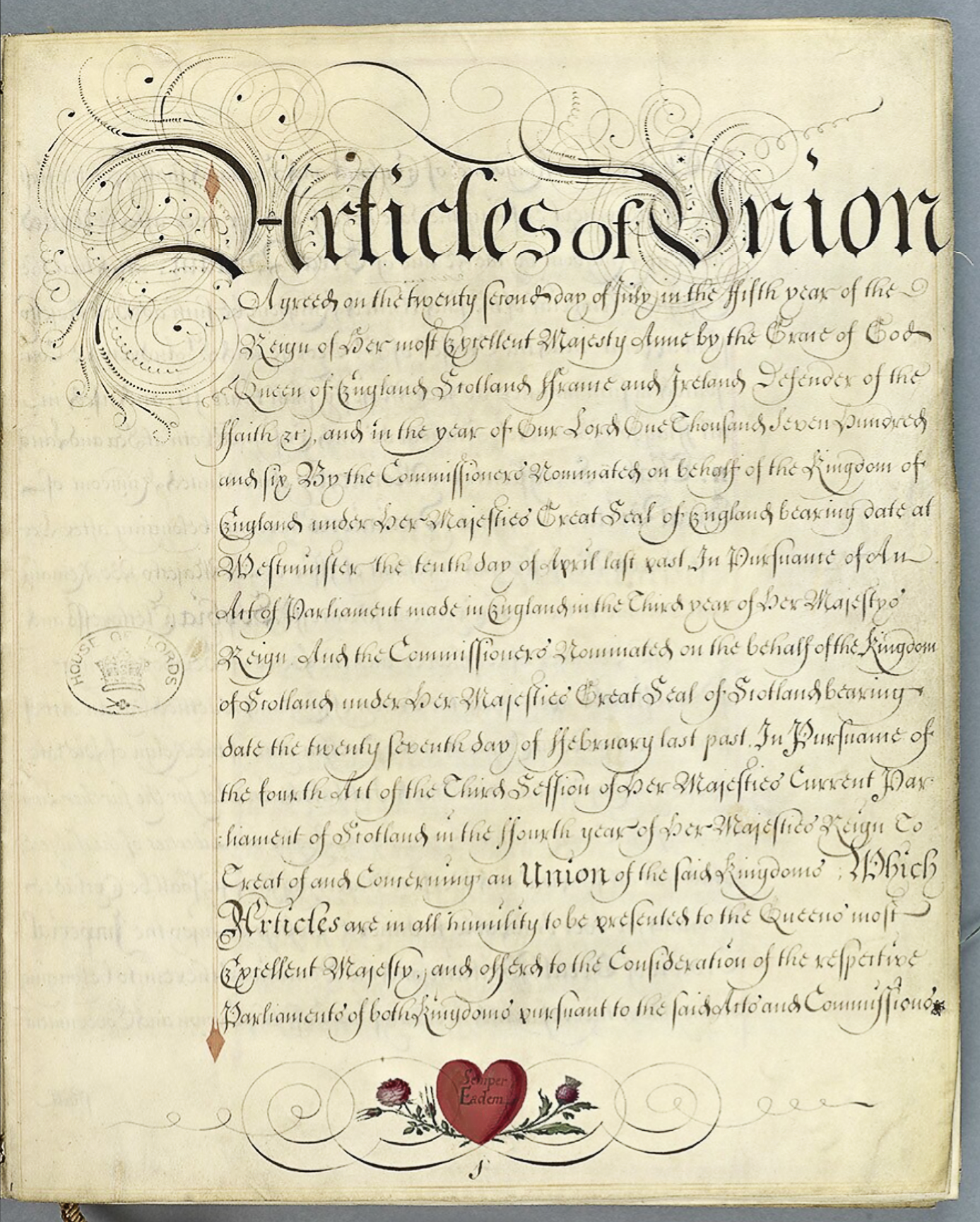
Articles of the Acts of Union 1707, which united the kingdoms of England and Scotland into Great Britain

A political union is a single political entity composed of, or created from smaller polities. The term also refers to the actual process of unifying them. These smaller polities are usually called federated states and federal territories in a federal government; they are called prefectures, regions, or provinces in the case of a centralised government. This form of government may be created through voluntary and mutual cession and is described as unionism (Note: In a different use of the term, unionism is used for membership or support of labour or trade unions. The term pro-union or -unity is sometimes used for political unionism instead of "unionism".) by its constituent members and proponents. In other cases, it may arise from political unification, characterised by coercion and conquest. The unification of separate states which, in the past, had together constituted a single entity is known as reunification. Unlike a personal union or real union, the individual constituent entities may have devolution of powers but are subordinate to a central government or coordinated in some sort of organization. In a federalised system, the constituent entities usually have internal autonomy, for example in the setup of police departments, and share power with the federal government, for whom external sovereignty, military forces, and foreign affairs are usually reserved. The union is recognised internationally as a single political entity. A political union may also be called a legislative union or state union. A union may be effected in many forms, broadly categorized as:

- Incorporating union
- Incorporating annexation
- Federal union
- Confederal union
- Federative annexation
- Mixed unions

== Incorporating union ==
In an incorporating union a new state is created, the former states being entirely dissolved into the new state (although some aspects may be preserved; see below).

Incorporating unions have been present throughout much of history, such as when:

- The Union of Lublin between the Grand Duchy of Lithuania and the Kingdom of Poland led to the creation of a Polish-Lithuanian Commonwealth, an elective monarchy where the Polish nobility elected the monarch;
- the Acts of Union (1707), between the Kingdom of Scotland and the Kingdom of England created the Kingdom of Great Britain;
- the Acts of Union (1800), between the Kingdom of Great Britain and the Kingdom of Ireland created the United Kingdom of Great Britain and Ireland;
- in 1910 the colonies of the Cape of Good Hope, Natal, Orange River Colony, and Transvaal were incorporated into the Union of South Africa;
- After the accession of the Bourbon dynasty to the throne of the Spanish Monarchy, they began to replace the system of personal union of the Crown of Castile, the states of the Crown of Aragon, and the Kingdom of Navarre into the unitary Kingdom of Spain, though the process did not become effective until the end of the War of the Spanish Succession (1701–1715), in which the Nueva Planta decrees of 1707 (kingdoms of Aragon and Valencia), 1715 (Kingdom of Majorca) and 1716 (Principality of Catalonia) abolished their respective legal jurisdictions, institutions and public laws, which were replaced by those of Castile. However, Navarre retained its political existence until the 1833 territorial division of Spain;
- in 1990 the People's Democratic Republic of Yemen (South Yemen) united with the Yemen Arab Republic (North Yemen) to form the Republic of Yemen;
- and in 1783 the Articles of Confederation were signed by each of the Thirteen Colonies, uniting them into the United States of America.

=== Preservation of interests ===
Nevertheless, a full incorporating union may preserve the laws and institutions of the former states, as happened in the creation of the United Kingdom. This may be simply a matter of practice or to comply with a guarantee given in the terms of the union. These guarantees may be to ensure the success of a proposed union (or in the least to prevent continuing resistance), as occurred in the union of Brittany and France in 1532 (Union of Brittany and France) in which a guarantee was given for the continuance of laws and of the Estates of Brittany (a guarantee revoked in 1789 at the French Revolution). The assurance that institutions are preserved in a union of states can also occur as states realize that, whilst a power imbalance exists (such as between the economic conditions of Scotland and England prior to the Acts of Union 1707), it is not so great that it precludes the possibility for concessions to be made. The Treaty of Union for creating the unified Kingdom of Great Britain in 1707 contained a guarantee of the continuance of the civil laws and the existing courts in Scotland (a continuing guarantee), which was significant for both parties. The Scottish, despite economic troubles during the Seven Ill Years preceding the union, still retained power to negotiate.

This marks a delineation of states that are able to ensure preservation of interests: there has to be some mutually beneficial reasoning behind the formal or informal preservation of interests. In the Union creating the United Kingdom of Great Britain and Ireland in 1801, no such guarantee was given for the laws and courts of the Kingdom of Ireland, though they were continued as a matter of practice. The informal recognition of such interests represents the different circumstances of the two Unions, the small base of institutional power in Ireland at the time (those who were the beneficiaries of the Protestant Ascendancy) had faced a revolution in the Irish Rebellion of 1798, and as a result there was an institutional drive toward unification, limiting the Irish negotiating power. However, informal guarantees were given to preclude the possibility of further Irish unrest in the period following the French Revolution of 1789 and the 1798 rebellion. These types of informal arrangements are more susceptible to changes; for example, Tyrol was guaranteed that its Freischütz companies would not be posted to fight outside Tyrol without their consent, a guarantee later revoked by the Austrian state. However, this case can be contrasted with the continued existence of the Scottish Parliament and a separate body of Scottish law distinct from English law.

== Incorporating annexation ==
In an incorporating annexation a state or states is united to and dissolved in an existing state, whose legal existence continues.

Annexation may be voluntary or, more frequently, by conquest.

Incorporating annexations have occurred at various points in history, such as when:

- in 1535 and 1542, under the two Laws in Wales Acts, the Kingdom of England formally annexed the Principality of Wales;
- in 1822 the Republic of Spanish Haiti was annexed by the Republic of Haiti;
- the Kingdom of Prussia used incorporating annexation to unite many of the German Princes during the Second Schleswig War, the Austro-Prussian War, and the Franco-Prussian War;
- the Kingdom of Sardinia annexed many of the Duchies and City-states in Italy during the period of Italian unification;
- in 1918, during the Podgorica Assembly, the Kingdom of Serbia annexed the Kingdom of Montenegro;
- also in 1918, following the Romanian military intervention in Bessarabia, the Kingdom of Romania annexed the Moldavian Democratic Republic;
- the People's Republic of China annexed Tibet (1951), East Turkestan (Xinjiang) (1949), Hong Kong (1997), and Macau (1999).

== Federal annexation ==
Federal annexation occurs when a unitary state becomes a federated unit of another existing state, the former continuing its legal existence. The new federated state thus ceases to be a state in international law but retains its legal existence in domestic law, subsidiary to the federal authority.

Prominent historical federal annexations include:

- Canada's annexations of British Columbia in 1871, Prince Edward Island in 1873, and the Dominion of Newfoundland in 1949;
- Ethiopia's annexation of Eritrea from 1951 to 1993;
- The First Brazilian Republic’s annexation of Acre in 1903;
- the admission of Geneva to the Swiss Confederation in 1815;
- West Germany's annexation of Saarland in 1957;
- the United States of America's annexations and subsequent granting of statehood to the Vermont Republic (1791), Republic of Texas (1846), and California Republic (1848);
- and the 2014 annexations of the Crimea and the city of Sevastopol by the Russian Federation (albeit viewed as illegal or otherwise given varying degrees of recognition by the international community).

== Mixed unions ==
The unification of Italy involved a mixture of unions. The kingdom consolidated around the Kingdom of Sardinia, with which several states voluntarily united to form the Kingdom of Italy. Others polities, such as the Kingdom of the Two Sicilies and the Papal States, were conquered and annexed. Formally, the union in each territory was sanctioned by a popular referendum where people were formally asked if they agreed to have as their new ruler Vittorio Emanuele II of Sardinia and his legitimate heirs.

The unification of Germany began in earnest when the Kingdom of Prussia annexed numerous petty states in 1866.

== Historical unions ==
- Unification of Nepal starting from 1744 A.D.
- Thai reunification in 1776 under King Taksin the Great
- Union of Moldavia and Wallachia, leading to the apparition of modern Romania, in 1859
- Bulgarian unification in 1885, after the 1396 Ottoman conquest.
- Great Union of Romania in 1918
  - Unification of Bessarabia with Romania in 1918
  - Union of Bukovina with Romania in 1918
  - Union of Transylvania with Romania in 1918
- Creation of Yugoslavia in 1918
- Ukrainian unification in 1919
- Chinese reunification (1928) or "Northeast Flag Replacement" proclaimed the victory of the Guangzhou/Nanjing government led by the Kuomintang over the Beiyang government after the 1912 division.
- German reunification after the Peaceful Revolution (East Germany) 1989–90 on 3 October 1990, divided into West Germany and East Germany since the Potsdam Agreement on 1 August 1945.
  - German unification in 1866–1871; what became Germany (1871–1918) was heavily fragmented by feudalism and partible inheritance (Salic patrimony) during the Middle Ages but remained united under the overlordship of East Francia/the Kingdom of Germany and the Holy Roman Empire. However, the states grew steadily more de facto independent through the early modern era as imperial power waned. Finally, the Empire was dissolved in 1806 during the Napoleonic Wars, and the German states became fully sovereign and were only united (between 1815 and 1866) by the non-sovereign German Confederation.
  - Anschluss (1938 Nazi reunification of "Lesser Germany" and Austria into "Greater Germany")
- Italian unification 1815–1871, divided since its partition into the Lombard Kingdom (itself divided between Langobardia Major and Langobardia Minor) and the Byzantine Exarchate of Ravenna in 568, Italy was further divided since Charlemagne's conquest of Langobardia Major and Spoleto in 774 and the subsequent fragmentation due to feudalism.
- Polish reunification in 1918–1922, divided since 24 October 1795 save for a brief revival as the Duchy of Warsaw (1807–1815) during the Napoleonic Wars.
- Vietnamese reunification after the Vietnam War (1955–1975) in 1976, divided into South and North Vietnam since 1954.
- Tanganyika united with Zanzibar in 1964 to form Tanzania from 26 April 1964 to date.
- Yemeni unification between the country's north and south halves on 22 May 1990, divided since the North Yemen's independence from the Turkish Empire in November 1918.

== Supranational and continental unions ==
In addition to regional movements, supranational and continental unions that promote progressive integration between its members started appearing in the second half of the 20th century, first by the European Union (EU). Other examples of such unions include the ASEAN (Association of Southeast Asian Nations), the Asia-Pacific Economic Cooperation Forum, and the Pacific Islands Forum.

== Academic analysis ==
The political position of the United Kingdom is often discussed, as well as former states like Serbia and Montenegro (2003–2006), the Soviet Union (1922–1991) and the United Arab Republic (1958–1961).

Lord Durham was widely regarded as one of the most important thinkers in the history of the British Empire's constitutional evolution. He articulated the difference between a full legislative union and a federation. In his 1839 Report, in discussing the proposed union of Upper and Lower Canada, he says:

Two kinds of union have been proposed – federal and legislative. By the first, the separate legislature of each province would be preserved in its present form and retain almost all its present attributes of internal legislation, the federal legislature exercising no power save in those matters which may have been expressly ceded to it by the constituent provinces. A legislative union would imply a complete incorporation of the provinces included in it under one legislature, exercising universal and sole legislative authority over all of them in exactly the same manner as the Parliament legislates alone for the whole of the British Isles.

However, unification is not merely voluntary. It requires a balance of power between two or more states, which can create an equal monetary, economic, social and cultural environment. Those states that are eligible to unify must also agree to a transition from anarchy, where there is no sovereignty above the state level, to hierarchy.

States can decide to enter a voluntary union as a solution for existing problems and to face possible threats, such as environmental threats for instance. The task of triggering a political crisis and to get the attention of the citizens toward the unification's necessity is in the hands of the elites. It rarely succeeds (with exceptions such as the Old Swiss Confederacy and the confederation of the United States), and at times even leads to a forced unification (Italy, USSR), where the unified states are deeply unequal.

From a realist perspective, small states can unify in order to face strong states or to conquer weak ones. One of the reasons to seek unification to a stronger state besides a common threat can be a situation of negligence or ignorance on behalf of the weak state.

According to a 1975 study by University of Rochester political scientist William Riker, unions were motivated by security threats. However, in contrast to Riker, Ryan Griffiths, a Syracuse University political scientist, published a paper in 2010 in which he analyzed voluntary political unifications from 1816 to 2001 and found that while unifications have occurred without security threats, they have not taken place in the absence of a common language.

== See also ==
- Confederation
- Federation
- Irredentism
- List of proposed state mergers
- Real union
- Secession
- Union (disambiguation)
- Unionism (disambiguation) § Politics
