= Nuala na Meadóige Ní Fionnachta =

Nuala na Meadóige Ní Fionnachta (fl. 1390s) was a Gaelic Irish woman. Her nickname means Nuala of the Daggers.

== Biography ==
Ní Fionnachta was a member of the Síl Muiredaig (a branch of the Uí Briúin Ai), the royal dynasty of Connacht. She was born and raised at Donamon Castle, which had been constructed by her family before 1154 and was the family seat.

Nuala was married to the lord of the district of Clanconway, but murdered him and married one of the Burkes, who seized the lands, including the castles of Dunamon and Glinsk.

Nuala's son was David Burke (a quo Mac David Burke). Local tradition holds that when attacked by O Connor of Ballintober, David considered retreating until Nuala, seeing his fear, raised up her petticoats and told him Teidh suas a bhfolach uathfa san ait as a dtainig tu ("Get thee up, my fine warrior, to the place from whence you came.") Nuala's derision caused David to stay and fight, and he was killed. The Burkes descended from David took the name Mac David Burke.

Among her descendants were those ennobled as the Burke Baronets.
