= 1700 in Ireland =

- Centuries: 15th; 16th; 17th; 18th; 19th
- Decades: 1680s; 1690s; 1700s; 1710s; 1720s
- See also: Other events of 1700; List of years in Ireland

Events from the year 1700 in Ireland.

== Incumbent ==
- Monarch: William III

== Events ==
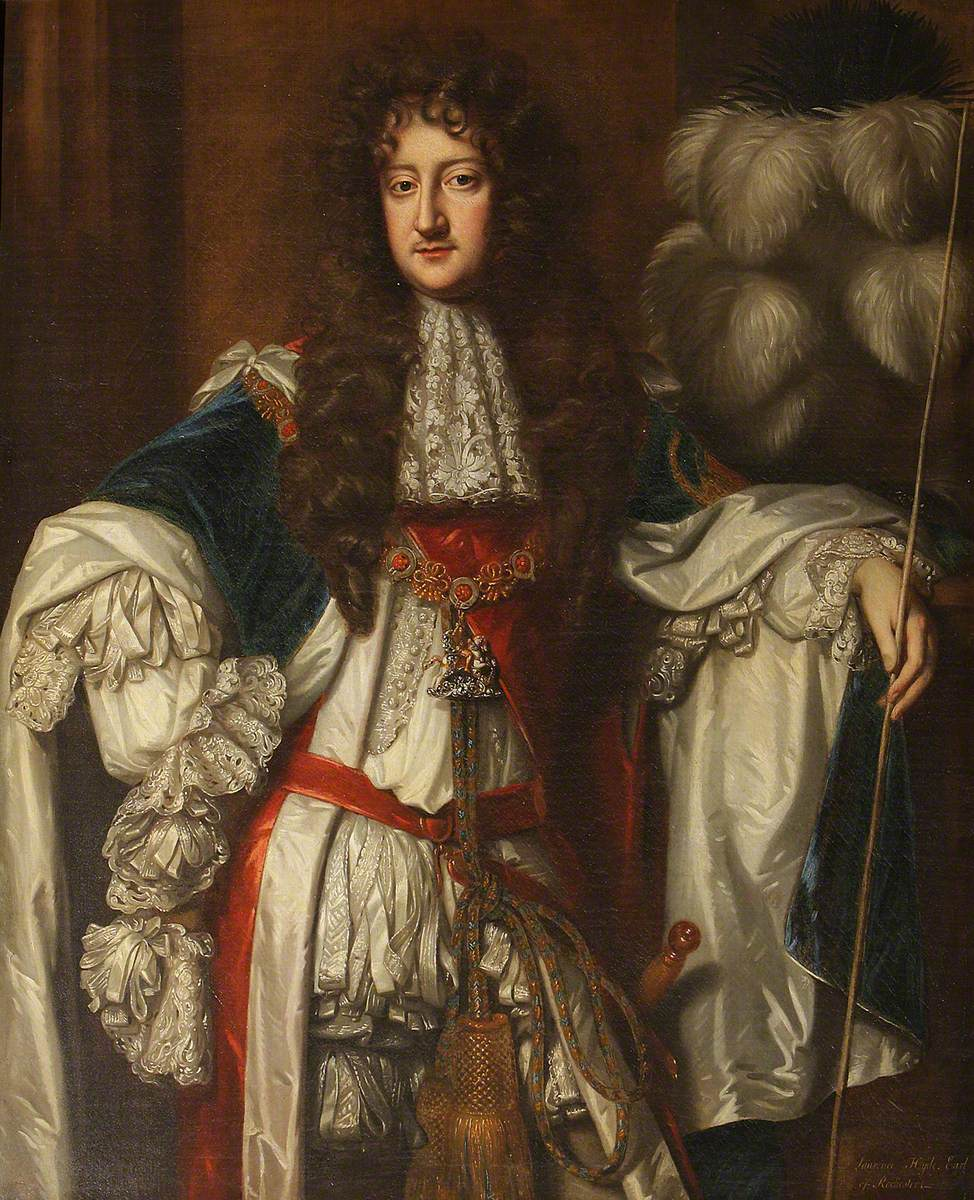
Laurence Hyde, Earl of Rochester

- December 28 – Laurence Hyde, 1st Earl of Rochester, appointed Lord Lieutenant of Ireland.

== Arts and literature ==
- c. March – the Yellow Book of Lecan is acquired by antiquary Edward Lhuyd.
- An edition of the late 16th-century Scots poet Alexander Montgomerie's The Cherrie and the Slae is printed in Ulster.

== Births ==
- James Arbuckle, poet and critic (d. 1742)
- Daniel O'Reilly, Roman Catholic Bishop of Clogher (d. 1778)
- James Stopford, 1st Earl of Courtown, politician (d. 1770)
- William O'Brien, 4th Earl of Inchiquin, peer and politician (d. 1777)

== Deaths ==
- Sir William Gore, 3rd Baronet.
