= Edward Tyrrell =

Edward Tyrrell may refer to:

- Sir Edward Tyrrell (MP for Buckingham) (1551–1606), member of the Parliament of England for Buckingham
- Edward Tyrrell (priest hunter) (died 1713), priest-hunter based in Ireland.
- Sir Edward Tyrrell, 1st Baronet, of Lynn (died 1691), Anglo-Irish landowner, Jacobite and member of the Parliament of Ireland for Belturbet
