= Gowler =

Gowler is an English language surname with its origins in Old English.

== History of the surname ==
Recorded in the spellings of Gawler and Gowler, this name is of Old English pre-7th-century origins. It is occupational and possibly a nickname for a banker, although in the original sense of the word, it means a money-changer or money-lender.

The 13th-century surname derives from the ancient word "gafol", meaning "tribute or interest", and this developed into the Middle English 12th-century "gaveler, goveler, or gowler", different spellings being found in different regions of the country. The agent suffix "-er" indicates a 'worker', although this is not the usual term associated with banking. The now mainly obsolete word "gavelkind" described a system of land tenancy found only in the county of Kent in England, and presided over by a "gaveler". At a time when tenants were expected not only to pay rent for their own lands, but also to put in time on behalf of the landlord, "gavelkind" was unique in being payment for the land only.

== First usage ==
Early examples of the surname include William Le Gaulere, in the Fees Court of Colchester, Essex, in 1305, James Gawler of Witham, Essex, in 1551, and Nicholas Gowler, who married Maudlyne Williams on 4 May 1623, at St. Giles's Cripplegate, London. The first recorded spelling of the family name is that of Ralph Gauelere, dated 1206, in the pipe rolls of the county of Dorset, where he held estates in that shire.

There appears to have been a sudden influx of Gowlers into the Fenland area of Cambridgeshire around 1400AD and it is an area where the Gowler name flourished in the centuries after, appearing in most of the Fenland villages and towns. In the early years, before Ramsey Abbey was demolished by Henry VIII, Gowlers are recorded as working for the abbey, and later they are recorded as working on the Cromwell estates in Huntingdonshire.

== Notable people with the surname ==
- Oliver Gowler (1812–1865) English born Canadian pioneer farmer
- David Gowler American author and professor at Emory University
