= 1707 in Ireland =

- Centuries: 16th; 17th; 18th; 19th; 20th
- Decades: 1680s; 1690s; 1700s; 1710s; 1720s
- See also: Other events of 1707; List of years in Ireland

Events from the year 1707 in Ireland.

== Incumbent ==
- Monarch: Anne

== Events ==
- April 14 (April 25 New Style) – at the Battle of Almansa (Spain) in the War of the Spanish Succession, the Bourbon army of Spain and France (with Irish mercenaries) under the French-born Englishman James FitzJames, 1st Duke of Berwick, soundly defeats the allied forces of Portugal, England, and the Dutch Republic led by the French-born Huguenot in English service Henri de Massue, Earl of Galway.
- October - Marsh's Library, the first public library in Ireland, is established by an Act of the Irish Parliament called ‘An Act for Settling and Preserving a Publick Library forever’.
- October 24 - an act of the Parliament of Ireland creates the Dublin Ballast Office to improve Dublin Port.
- Tailors' Hall completed in Dublin.

== Births ==
- James Cuffe, landowner and politician (d. 1762)
- Arabella Fitzmaurice, later Lady Arabella Denny, philanthropist (d. 1792)
- Matthew Dubourg, musician (d. 1767)
- Philip Skelton, Church of Ireland cleric and controversialist (d. 1787)
- Approximate date – Sir Robert Deane, 5th Baronet, lawyer and politician (d. 1770)

== Deaths ==
George Farquhar

- January 13 – Anthony Sharp, Quaker wool merchant (b. 1643)
- April 29 – George Farquhar, dramatist (b. 1677 or 1678)
- c. July 1 – William Handcock, politician (b. c.1631)
- August 9 (bur.) – William Cairnes, politician and merchant (b. c.1669)
- September 21 – Dominic Maguire, exiled Roman Catholic Archbishop of Armagh.
- December 31 – Nathaniel Foy, Church of Ireland Bishop of Waterford and Lismore
- Sir Francis Blundell, 3rd Baronet, politician (b. 1643)
- Colonel The Honourable John Caulfeild, soldier and politician (b. 1661)
- Ludowyk Smits, portrait painter (b. 1635 in Holland)
