= 1704 in Ireland =

- Centuries: 16th; 17th; 18th; 19th; 20th
- Decades: 1680s; 1690s; 1700s; 1710s; 1720s
- See also: Other events of 1704; List of years in Ireland

Events from the year 1704 in Ireland.

== Incumbent ==
- Monarch: Anne

== Events ==
- March 4 – Penal laws passed by the Parliament of Ireland to suppress the Catholic Church:
  - Popery Act enforces various restrictions on Catholics, in particular inheritance by gavelkind for Catholics and male primogeniture for Protestants, which tends to prevent an increase in Catholic landholding.
  - Registration Act requires all existing Catholic priests to register in their local magistrates' court by July 20, to pay two £50 surety bonds for good behavior, and to stay in the county where they registered, with a financial inducement to convert to the Church of Ireland.
- October 26 – Richard Levinge, member of the Irish House of Commons, is created 1st Levinge Baronet, of High Park in the County of Westmeath.
- Thomas Taylor, member of the Irish House of Commons, is created 1st Taylor Baronet, of Kells in the County of Meath.
- A House of Industry opens in Dublin to accommodate the destitute.

== Arts and literature ==
- George Farquhar co-writes the play The Stage Coach.
- Jonathan Swift publishes his first major satires, A Tale of a Tub and The Battle of the Books, in London.

== Births ==
- William Handcock, politician (d. 1741)

== Deaths ==
- January 1 – Dominic Burke Roman Catholic Bishop of Elphin.
- February 20 – Thomas FitzWilliam, 4th Viscount FitzWilliam, statesman (b. c.1640)
- c. February – Sir Thomas Butler, 3rd Baronet, politician.
- August – Francis Taaffe, 3rd Earl of Carlingford, courtier and soldier.
- November – Henry Nugent, soldier.
