= Irish farm subdivision =

Inheritance practice in Ireland from 1704

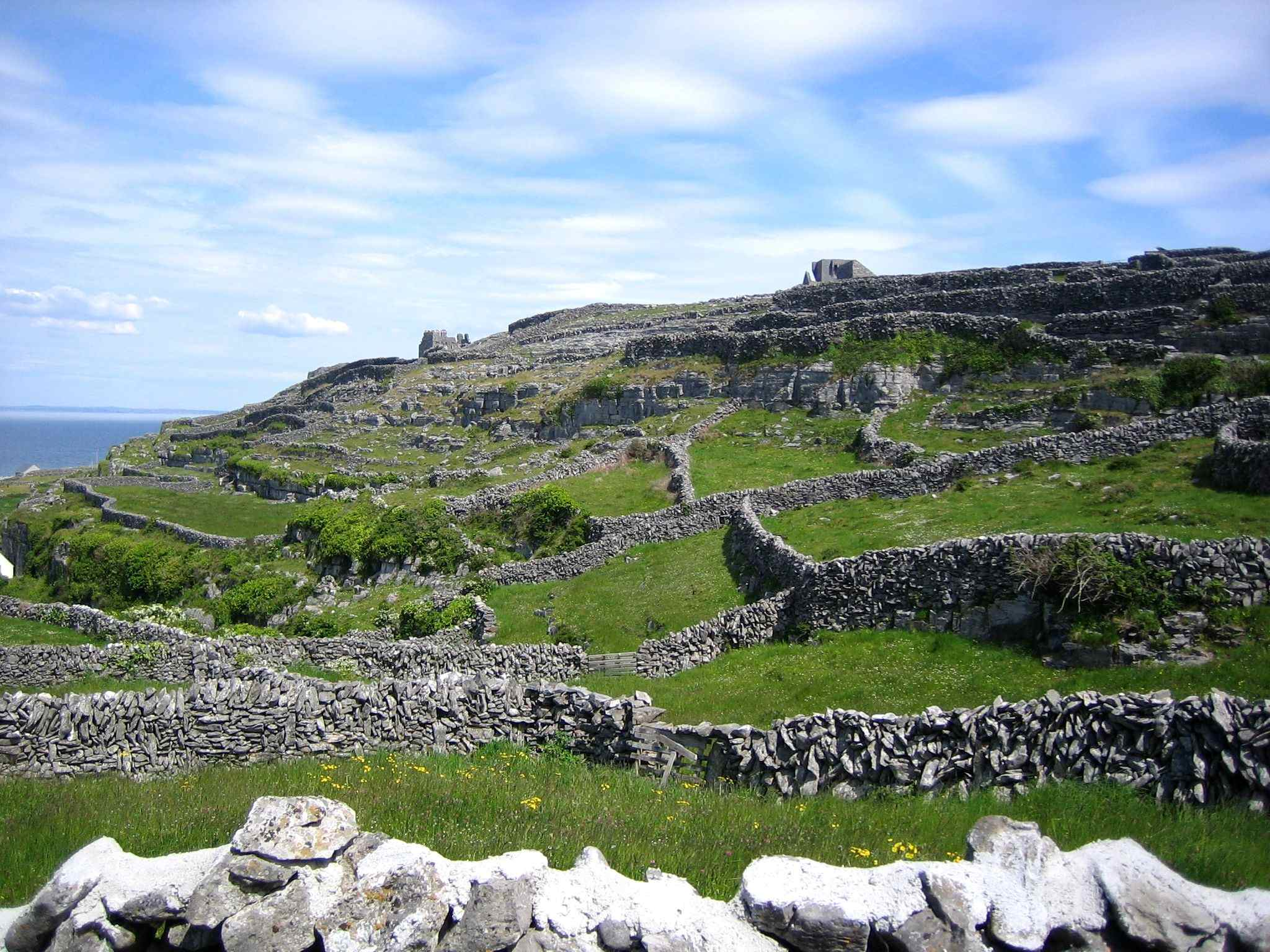
Land subdivision in Inisheer.

The Popery Act (Penal Law) of 1704 required land owned by Roman Catholics to be divided equally between all a landholder's sons, both legitimate and illegitimate, on his death. This had formerly been normal under the law of gavelkind, a law abolished by the Dublin administration in 1604. Known as sub-division, this inheritance practice continued by tradition until the middle of the 19th century.

The growth of population inevitably caused subdivision. The population grew from a level of about 500,000 in 1000 AD to about 2 million by 1700, and 5 million by 1800. On the eve of the Great Famine, the population of Ireland had risen to 8 million, with most people living on ever-smaller farms and depending on the potato as a staple diet.

By the 1840s, many farms had become so small that potatoes were the only food source that could be grown in sufficient quantities to feed a family. This was to have disastrous effects when, in the period 1844-50 a series of potato blights struck, making much of the potatoes grown inedible. This period came to be known as the Great Famine and led to the deaths and emigration of millions of people.

From the 1870s the practice arose of passing a holding to one child only, which with the benefits of the Irish Land Acts, meant that the survivors prospered.

A secondary effect of the prohibition of sub-division was that other children, who would previously have inherited part of the family farm tenancy or married into a similar small farm, were forced to seek employment elsewhere. Many emigrated. Many entered religious life, as Roman Catholic priests, nuns or monks, such options becoming available due to a re-organisation of the Roman Catholic Church in Ireland under Cardinal Cullen from the 1850s. This influx of young people into religious life, thanks to the disappearance of sub-division, in part, explains the massive growth in clerical numbers in Ireland in the period.

Irish landholdings underwent further massive change in the period between the 1880s and the 1930s when a series of Land Acts by the Irish Land Commission and Congested Districts Board for Ireland broke up the previous large estates from which tenant farmers rented property and who were empowered by British and (later) Irish government grants and loans to buy their farms instead of renting them.

- Landlord and Tenant (Ireland) Act 1870: this had little if any practical effect.
- Land Law (Ireland) Act 1881: Gave tenants real security ("the Three Fs": Fair Rent, Fixity of Tenure and Free Sale). It was too little, too late: by this time the Irish were demanding full proprietorship.
- Land Purchase (Ireland) Act 1903: offered generous inducement to landlords to sell their estates to the Land Commission, which would then collect land annuities instead of rents.

== See also ==
- Irish Land League
- Land Commission
- Great Famine (Ireland)
