= Gavelkind in Ireland =

Under Brehon law, gavelkind, a form of partible inheritance, was the system of land inheritance. The Normans called the Irish inheritance law the name gavelkind because of its apparent similarity to Jute inheritance in Kent.

== The law ==
Upon the death of a landholder, his land was divided equally among his sons. The sons of concubines, if accepted by the father as being his sons, had the same rights of inheritance as their legitimately-born brothers. The adopted sons of the landholder, if any, could also receive a share of his lands only if the landholder had made specific and public provision before his death, and the extent of land thus received by an adopted son was not necessarily equal to that received by the landholder's own sons.

While sons received equal shares of the land, the father often prescribed the division by stating which parcel of land was to go to which son. Another known custom was for the youngest son to divide the land into equal parts and for his brothers to choose their parcels. The eldest chose first, followed by the second and so on until the youngest had received the remaining land.

The purpose of the system was to ensure equitable division of the land.

If a land-holder had no sons, his widow and unwed daughters, if any, would collectively hold a life interest on the entire land. Their rights on the produce of the land would lapse upon their marriage or death, as the case may be. Upon the last such lapse of usufruct, the land would devolve upon the agnatic kin of the last male landholder.

== Queen Anne's law ==
In 1703, in the reign of Queen Anne, a law was enacted (2 Anne c. 6 (I)) by the Irish parliament, which is commonly known as the Gavelkind Act. The law made sectarian affiliation a primary determinant of the inheritance of land. When a Catholic died, his estate would normally be divided equally among his sons. However, an eldest son who converted to the Protestant faith would inherit all of the land alone, and all of his Catholic brothers would be disinherited. The law was intended to put land into the hands of Protestants and to reduce the size and therefore the influence of Catholic landed estates.

== See also ==
- Derbfine
- Gavelkind

== Sources ==
- Robinson, On Gavelkind
- Digby, History of the Law of Real Property
- Pollock and F. W. Maitland, History of English Law
- Challis, Real Property.
