= 1708 in Ireland =

- Centuries: 16th; 17th; 18th; 19th; 20th
- Decades: 1680s; 1690s; 1700s; 1710s; 1720s
- See also: Other events of 1708; List of years in Ireland

Events from the year 1708 in Ireland.

== Incumbent ==
- Monarch: Anne

== Events ==
- March 11 – the scholar Dr. Thomas Milles is appointed Church of Ireland Bishop of Waterford and Lismore, in which office he will serve until his death in 1740 (consecrated April 18 in St Patrick's Cathedral, Dublin).
- March 25 – a registry of deeds begins operation in Ireland.
- The original wooden Belfast Castle, the home of Sir Arthur Chichester, baron of Belfast, is burned down.
- St. Anne's Parish Act of 1707 is passed, dividing the parish of St. Nicholas Without, Dublin, and giving part of it the denomination of St. Luke's.

== Births ==
- January 7 (in England) – George Stone, Archbishop of Armagh (Church of Ireland) (d. 1764)
- July 13 (baptised in England) – Richard Robinson, 1st Baron Rokeby, Archbishop of Armagh (Church of Ireland) and benefactor (d. 1794)
- July 19 – Philip Francis, clergyman and translator (d. 1773)
- Risteárd Buidhe Kirwan, soldier and duellist (d. 1779)

== Deaths ==
- Sir Ulick Burke, 3rd Baronet, landowner and politician.
- Francis Makemie, clergyman, considered to be the founder of Presbyterianism in United States of America (b. 1658)
