= Sir Theobald Burke, 13th Baronet =

Irish baronet and soldier (1833–1909)

Lt-Col. Sir Theobald Hubert Burke Bt
- Teabóid Búrca
- Born: 25 March 1833
- Died: 4 April 1909 (aged 76); London
- Parents: William Burke; Emma Dillon
- Relatives: Thomas Henry Burke (brother); Augustus Nicholas Burke (brother)
- Military career
- Allegiance: United Kingdom
- Branch: British Army
- Service years: 1854–1866
- Rank: Lieutenant-Colonel (1866)
- Units: 88th Connaught Rangers; 18th Royal Irish Regiment
- Conflicts: Crimean War (1854–1856); Indian Mutiny (1857)

Lt Colonel Sir Theobald Hubert Burke, 13th Baronet (25 March 1833 – 4 April 1909) was an Irish soldier and baronet who served during the Crimean War and the Indian Mutiny.

== Background ==
Burke was born in Waterslade House, Tuam, County Galway. He was one of six sons of William Burke of Knocknagur of the ancient Galway family, the Burkes of Glinsk.

== Career ==
He was commissioned into the British Army (88th Connaught Rangers) at an early age, and served through the Crimean War and the Indian Mutiny, and later exchanged into the 18th Royal Irish Regiment in 1866, and attained the rank of lieutenant colonel.

== Family ==
He inherited the title from Sir John Lionel Burke, 12th Baronet, in 1884, and when he died in London aged 76 the Baronetcy became extinct.

- One brother Thomas Henry Burke was Permanent Under Secretary at the Irish Office.
- Another brother Augustus Nicholas Burke was an artist.

== Arms ==
Coat of arms of Sir Theobald Burke, 13th Baronet
Crest Out of a ducal coronet Or, a plume of five ostrich feathers Argent. Escutcheon Or, a cross Gules in the dexter canton a lion rampant sable Motto IN HOC SIGNO VINCES (In this sign thou shalt conquer)

== See also ==
- House of Burgh, an Anglo-Norman and Hiberno-Norman dynasty founded in 1193

Baronetage of Ireland
Preceded by John Lionel Burke	Baronet (of Glinsk); 1884–1909	Extinct
