= Sir Ulick Burke, 3rd Baronet =

Irish landowner and politician (d.1708)

Sir Ulick Burke Bt
- Ulliac Búrca

MP for County Galway
- In office 1689–1692 Serving with Sir Walter Blake, 6th Bt
- Succeeded by: John Eyre; Sir Oliver St George, 1st Bt

Personal details
- Died: 1708
- Spouse: Ismay Kelly
- Children: None
- Parent: Edmund Burke, 2nd Baronet
- Relatives: John Burke, 4th Baronet (half-brother)

Sir Ulick Burke, 3rd Baronet (English: /ˈjuːlɪk/ YOO-lik; died 1708) of Glinsk, was an Irish landowner and politician in County Galway who was MP for Galway (1689–92).

== Career ==
He was the son of Sir Edmund Burke, 2nd Baronet. The family resided at Glinsk Castle. Ulick Burke espoused the cause of King James II and was an MP for County Galway in the Patriot Parliament of 1689, and was included in the articles of the Treaty of Limerick. He married Ismay, fourth daughter of Colonel John Kelly of Skreen, County Roscommon. He died without issue in 1708 and was succeeded by his half brother, John Burke, 4th Baronet.

== Lament for Sir Ulick Burke Marbhna Uillioc Búrca ==
Sir Ulick was immortalised by the Irish composer and musician Turlough O'Carolan is his songs Ulliac Búrca (Ulick Burke) and Marbhna Uillioc Búrca (Lament for Sir Ulick Burke).

Coat of arms of Sir Ulick Burke, 3rd Baronet
Crest Out of a ducal coronet Or, a plume of five ostrich feathers Argent. Escutcheon Or, a cross Gules in the dexter canton a lion rampant sable Motto IN HOC SIGNO VINCES (In this sign thou shalt conquer)

== See also ==
- House of Burgh, an Anglo-Norman and Hiberno-Norman dynasty founded in 1193

Parliament of Ireland
Preceded by	Member of Parliament for County Galway; 1689–1692; With: Sir Walter Blake, 6th Bt	Succeeded by John Eyre; Sir Oliver St George, 1st Bt
Baronetage of Ireland
Preceded by Edmund Bourke	Baronet (of Glinsk); 1687–1708	Succeeded by John Burke
