= 1770 in Ireland =

- Centuries: 16th; 17th; 18th; 19th; 20th
- Decades: 1750s; 1760s; 1770s; 1780s; 1790s
- See also: Other events of 1770; List of years in Ireland

Events from the year 1770 in Ireland.

== Incumbent ==
- Monarch: George III

== Events ==
- 21 March – the College Historical Society, a debating society at Trinity College Dublin, founded by Edmund Burke, holds its first meeting when Burke's Club (founded 1747) merges with the Historical Club (1753).
- Lough Ree Yacht Club is founded as Athlone Yacht Club.
- July – A civil action is brought against Owen Coffee, an attorney from Clonkeen, County Westmeath by Captain Andrew Armstrong of Castle Armstrong, King's County, for having employed Armstrong's runaway East Indian slave, Peter Kent, while he was still his property. Armstrong is awarded £100 damages.

== Arts and literature ==
- John O'Keeffe's play The Giant's Causeway.

== Births ==
- 30 November – Andrew Blayney, 11th Baron Blayney, soldier, politician and peer (died 1832).
  Full date unknown
  - William Reid Clanny, physician and inventor of the Clanny safety lamp for miners (died 1850).
  - James Orr, rhyming weaver poet (died 1816).

== Deaths ==
- 12 January – James Stopford, 1st Earl of Courtown, politician (born 1700).
- 12 September – William Annesley, 1st Viscount Glerawly, politician (born 1710).
  Full date unknown
  - Francis Lucas, naval officer and merchant trader (b. c1741).
