= 1711 in Ireland =

- Centuries: 16th; 17th; 18th; 19th; 20th
- Decades: 1690s; 1700s; 1710s; 1720s; 1730s
- See also: Other events of 1711; List of years in Ireland

Events from the year 1711 in Ireland.

== Incumbent ==
- Monarch: Anne

== Events ==
- Conclusion of Islandmagee witch trials: Eight women from Islandmagee are convicted in the last known witch trial in Ireland.
- 15 December – Penal Laws (Ireland): the Occasional Conformity Act ("An Act for preserving the Protestant Religion"), passed by the Parliament of Great Britain, bars Roman Catholics from public office.
- The Houghers began a campaign of agrarian unrest spanning five western counties. This constituted an isolated period, with Ireland not experiencing regular agrarian unrest until the 1760s.
