= 1712 in Ireland =

- Centuries: 16th; 17th; 18th; 19th; 20th
- Decades: 1690s; 1700s; 1710s; 1720s; 1730s
- See also: Other events of 1712; List of years in Ireland

Events from the year 1712 in Ireland.

== Incumbent ==
- Monarch: Anne

== Events ==
- 12 November – A riot takes place in Dublin during a performance of Nicholas Rowe's Tamerlane a play which supports the Whig view of William III as a justified conqueror of Britain and Ireland. A prologue written by the Whiggish Samuel Garth is read, which inflames Tory and Jacobite opinion.
- Bridge built over the River Bann at Banbridge.
- A translation of the 1662 Book of Common Prayer into Irish, made by John Richardson (1664–1747), is published.

== Births ==
- October 15 – Leslie Corry, politician (d. 1741)
- October 22 – James Hamilton, 8th Earl of Abercorn, politician (d. 1789)
- Bartholomew Mosse, surgeon, impresario, founder of the Rotunda Hospital in Dublin (d. 1759)
- Marcus Paterson, lawyer and politician (d. 1787)
- approximate date
  - Riggs Falkiner, politician (d. 1797)
  - Arthur Jones-Nevill, politician (d. 1771)

== Deaths ==
- January 5 – Richard Jones, 1st Earl of Ranelagh, politician (b. 1641)
- October – Robert Blennerhassett, lawyer (b. 1652)
- William Edmondson, founder of Quakerism in Ireland (b. 1627)
