= 1705 in Ireland =

- Centuries: 16th; 17th; 18th; 19th; 20th
- Decades: 1680s; 1690s; 1700s; 1710s; 1720s
- See also: Other events of 1705; List of years in Ireland

Events from the year 1705 in Ireland.

== Incumbent ==
- Monarch: Anne

== Events ==
- November 5 – The Dublin Gazette, the official newspaper of the British Government in Ireland, publishes its first edition.
- Royal Mines Act enacted.

== Births ==
- Constantia Grierson, editor, poet and classical scholar (d. 1732)

== Deaths ==
- March 10 – John Temple, lawyer and politician (b. 1632)
- July 29 – Richard Tennison, Church of Ireland Bishop of Meath (b. 1642)
- December 25 – Nehemiah Donnellan, lawyer (b. 1649)
- Diarmuid mac Sheáin Bhuí Mac Cárthaigh, poet.
