= 1703 in Ireland =

- Centuries: 16th; 17th; 18th; 19th; 20th
- Decades: 1680s; 1690s; 1700s; 1710s; 1720s
- See also: Other events of 1703; List of years in Ireland

Events from the year 1703 in Ireland.

== Incumbent ==
- Monarch: Anne

== Events ==
- June 11 – Charles Hickman is consecrated as Church of Ireland Bishop of Derry.
- September 11 – a privateering expedition comprising the ships St George and Cinque Ports commanded by William Dampier leaves Kinsale for South America.
- Parliament of Ireland assembles on 21 September, the first under Anne, Queen of Great Britain, and the first for five years.
- Popery Act (An Act to prevent the further Growth of Popery), enacted by the Parliament of Ireland, reintroduces gavelkind: when a Roman Catholic dies, his estate is to be divided equally among his sons (legitimate or otherwise) if they retain their Catholic faith.
- Treason Act (Ireland) 1703, enacted by the Parliament of Ireland, enforces the Protestant line of succession to the British throne.
- Sir Robert Doyne is appointed as Chief Justice of the Irish Common Pleas.
- The Parliament of Ireland investigates the possibility of improving navigation on the rivers Shannon and Barrow and constructing a Newry Canal.

== Births ==
- January 22 (in France) – Antoine Walsh, slave trader and Jacobite (d. 1763 in San Domingo)
- February 5 – Gilbert Tennent, Presbyterian pastor in Colonial America (d. 1764)
- March 1 – Philip Tisdall, lawyer and politician (d. 1777)
- September 29 – Philip Syng, silversmith (d. 1789 in the United States)
- Arthur Gore, 1st Earl of Arran, politician (d. 1773)
- John Ussher, politician (d. 1749)
- Approximate date
  - John Blakeney, politician (d. 1747)
  - Samuel Boyse, poet (d. 1749)
  - Henry Brooke, novelist and dramatist (d. 1783)
  - George Faulkner, publisher and bookseller (d. 1775)
