= Mikak =

First Inuk to travel to Europe (c. 1740 – 1795)

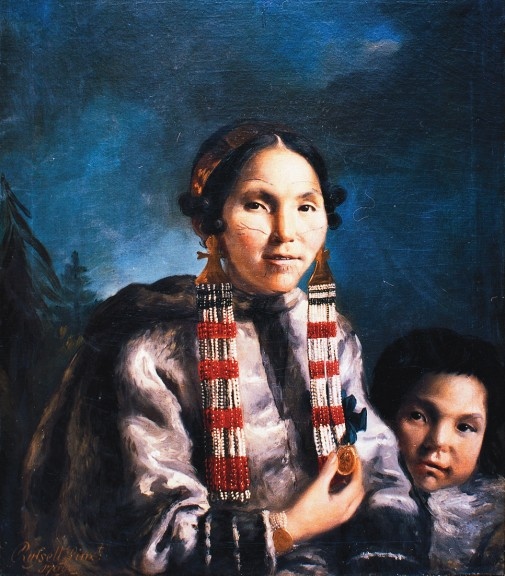
Painting of Mikak and her son Tutauk by John Russell in 1769.

Mikak (c. 1740 – October 1, 1795), also known as Micock, Mycock, or Mecock, was born in Labrador, Canada and died at Nain, Newfoundland and Labrador. As the daughter of a chief, Mikak held much respect in her tribe. She was one of several Inuit to travel to Europe in the 18th century and return to North America, although many Inuit who had travelled to Europe subsequently died from diseases, especially smallpox, before returning.

== Personal life ==
In 1762, Mikak married the son of an Inuk chief and they went on to have one son, named Tutauk. When her husband was murdered during a battle with English settlers, she adopted an orphaned boy named Karpik. It is well documented by Europeans in Labrador, as well as England, that Mikak was highly intelligent. She understood her value in the successful integration between the Moravians and indigenous Inuit residents and used her keen insight and strategy to navigate the circumstances. Even with those relationships, however, Mikak maintained a cautious distance from the Europeans.

== Moravianism & English Immigration ==
Mikak arrived in England with Newfoundland governor Hugh Palliser in November 1768 alongside her son and a young Inuit man called Karpik, having been captured during a skirmish with colonial seal-fur merchants in August of the previous year. Three Englishmen had been attempting to steal oil from Inuit stores, and were killed when discovered. This sparked a bloody combat, led by naval officer Francis Lucas, with twenty Inuit men being massacred that day, and four more being killed the following morning, including Mikak's husband. Mikak and her son Tutauk were captured during this latter encounter.

Whilst captured, Mikak endeared herself to Palliser, Lucas and a missionary called Jens Haven, who together realised the political and diplomatic opportunity she presented.

== Voyage to England ==
Haven also hoped that he could preach Moravianism to her, and she could then in turn spread the religion to her fellow Inuit. Bringing her to England, and returning her safely home, would (they thought) demonstrate the magnanimity of the colonial occupation in Labrador. Their plan, in short, was to calm ongoing hostilities with local Inuit by showing her kindness, and the apparent riches and generosity on offer in England.

She would eventually return to Labrador alongside Haven in 1770, working as a diplomatic emissary as envisaged.

== Later Life and Legacy ==
Upon her arrival back from England, her father, Nerkingoak, renamed her Nutarrak, meaning "changed or new born" to reflect the changes he saw since her voyage. She had a relationship with a second husband Tugalvina, though he quickly abandoned her for other women, including her own sister. Ultimately, she struck up a long-term relationship with one of Tugalvina's lovers' spurned husbands, a man named Pualo. In the latter decades of her life, any enmity towards the English who had captured her had faded to a such a degree that Tutauk himself had taken to using the name 'Palliser', after their captor. And though both she and Tutauk did (by Moravian accounts) profess belief in Christ, being baptised shortly before her death in 1795, she did so syncretically, never abandoning their own cultural practices and beliefs. On July 19th, 2011, Mikak was officially accepted as a National Historical Person.
