= Edward Tyrrell (priest hunter) =

Edward Tyrrell (died May 28, 1713) was a priest-hunter based in Ireland. He travelled the country from 1710 onwards looking for Catholic priests and bishops.

Tyrrell was working to enforce the Act to prevent the further Growth of Popery, commonly known as the Popery Act or the Gavelkind Act, which was an Act of parliament of the Parliament of Ireland passed in 1703 and amended in 1709, one of a series of penal laws against Roman Catholics.

He was convicted of bigamy and executed on May 28, 1713, having been reprieved for fifteen days after his original execution date.

== See also ==
- Gavelkind in Ireland

== References and sources ==
Notes

Sources

- Rafferty, Oliver (1994). Catholicism in Ulster, 1603-1983: an interpretative history. Columbia, SC: University of South Carolina Press. p. 306. ISBN 1-57003-025-1.
