= 1715 in Ireland =

- Centuries: 16th; 17th; 18th; 19th; 20th
- Decades: 1690s; 1700s; 1710s; 1720s; 1730s
- See also: Other events of 1715; List of years in Ireland

Events from the year 1715 in Ireland.

== Incumbent ==
- Monarch: George I

== Events ==
- County Palatine of Tipperary Act, an Act of the Parliament of Ireland, enables purchase by the crown of rights and revenues in County Tipperary held by the Dukes of Ormonde.
- George Evans is created 1st Baron Carbery in the Peerage of Ireland.

== Arts and literature ==
- First record of the actress and writer Eliza Haywood, performing in Thomas Shadwell's Shakespeare adaptation, Timon of Athens; or, The Man-Hater at the Smock Alley Theatre, Dublin.

== Births ==
- Sir William Johnson, 1st Baronet, pioneer and army officer in colonial New York (d. 1774).
- Patrick Lynch, emigrant to Rio de la Plata and landowner.
- Tadhg Gaelach Ó Súilleabháin, poet (d. 1795).

== Deaths ==
- December 14 – Thomas Dongan, 2nd Earl of Limerick, member of Irish Parliament, Royalist military officer during the English Civil War and governor of the Province of New York (b. 1634)
