= 1709 in Ireland =

- Centuries: 16th; 17th; 18th; 19th; 20th
- Decades: 1680s; 1690s; 1700s; 1710s; 1720s
- See also: Other events of 1709; List of years in Ireland

Events from the year 1709 in Ireland.

== Incumbent ==
- Monarch: Anne

== Events ==
- August 30 – the Parliament of Ireland passes an amending act which requires any adult male (including registered Roman Catholic priests) to take an oath of abjuration if required by a magistrate.
- September 4–8 – nearly 800 poor Protestant refugee families of German Palatines arrive in Dublin to be settled in Ireland.
- c. December – start of Hougher disturbances against the extension of livestock rearing in Connacht including maiming of cattle.

== Births ==
- October 13 – John Cole, 1st Baron Mountflorence, politician (d. 1767)
- Robert Nugent, 1st Earl Nugent, politician (d. 1788)
- Approximate date – Laetitia Pilkington, born Laetitia van Lewen, poet and memoirist (d. 1750)

== Deaths ==
- August 31 (September 11 NS) – Sir Thomas Prendergast, 1st Baronet, soldier, killed at the Battle of Malplaquet (b. c. 1660)
