= 1714 in Ireland =

- Centuries: 16th; 17th; 18th; 19th; 20th
- Decades: 1690s; 1700s; 1710s; 1720s; 1730s
- See also: Other events of 1714; List of years in Ireland

Events from the year 1714 in Ireland.

== Incumbent ==
- Monarch: Anne (until 1 August), then George I

== Events ==
- 1 August
  - George I becomes King of Great Britain and Ireland upon the death of Anne.
  - Former Governor of Londonderry and hero of the siege of Derry, Colonel John Mitchelburne, hoists the Crimson Flag on the steeple of St Columb's Cathedral to celebrate the Relief of Derry in 1689 and forms the first club known as the Apprentice Boys of Derry.
- Charles Spencer is appointed as British Lord Lieutenant of Ireland.
- Esther Vanhomrigh pursues Jonathan Swift to Ireland.
- First definitely known Dublin printing of the King James Version of the Bible.

== Births ==
- John Clegg, violinist (d. c.1746?)

== Deaths ==
- 5 July – Sir Henry Bingham, 3rd Baronet, politician (b. 1654)
- 1 August – Anne, Queen of Great Britain (b. 1665)
