= 1713 in Ireland =

- Centuries: 16th; 17th; 18th; 19th; 20th
- Decades: 1690s; 1700s; 1710s; 1720s; 1730s
- See also: Other events of 1713; List of years in Ireland

Events from the year 1713 in Ireland.

== Incumbent ==
- Monarch: Anne

== Events ==
- November–December – Parliament of Ireland meets and is prorogued without voting supply beyond the end of the year.
- Dublin election riot - A riot breaks out in Dublin during the contested election of the Dublin City constituency by the Whigs and Tories.

== Births ==
- 24 November – Laurence Sterne, Irish-born English novelist (d. 1768, England)

== Deaths ==
- 2 January – Lady Mary Butler, younger daughter of 2nd Duke of Ormonde and Jonathan Swift’s "greatest favourite" (b. 1689)
