= Augustus Nicholas Burke =

Irish artist (1838–1891)

Professor Augustus Burke RHA
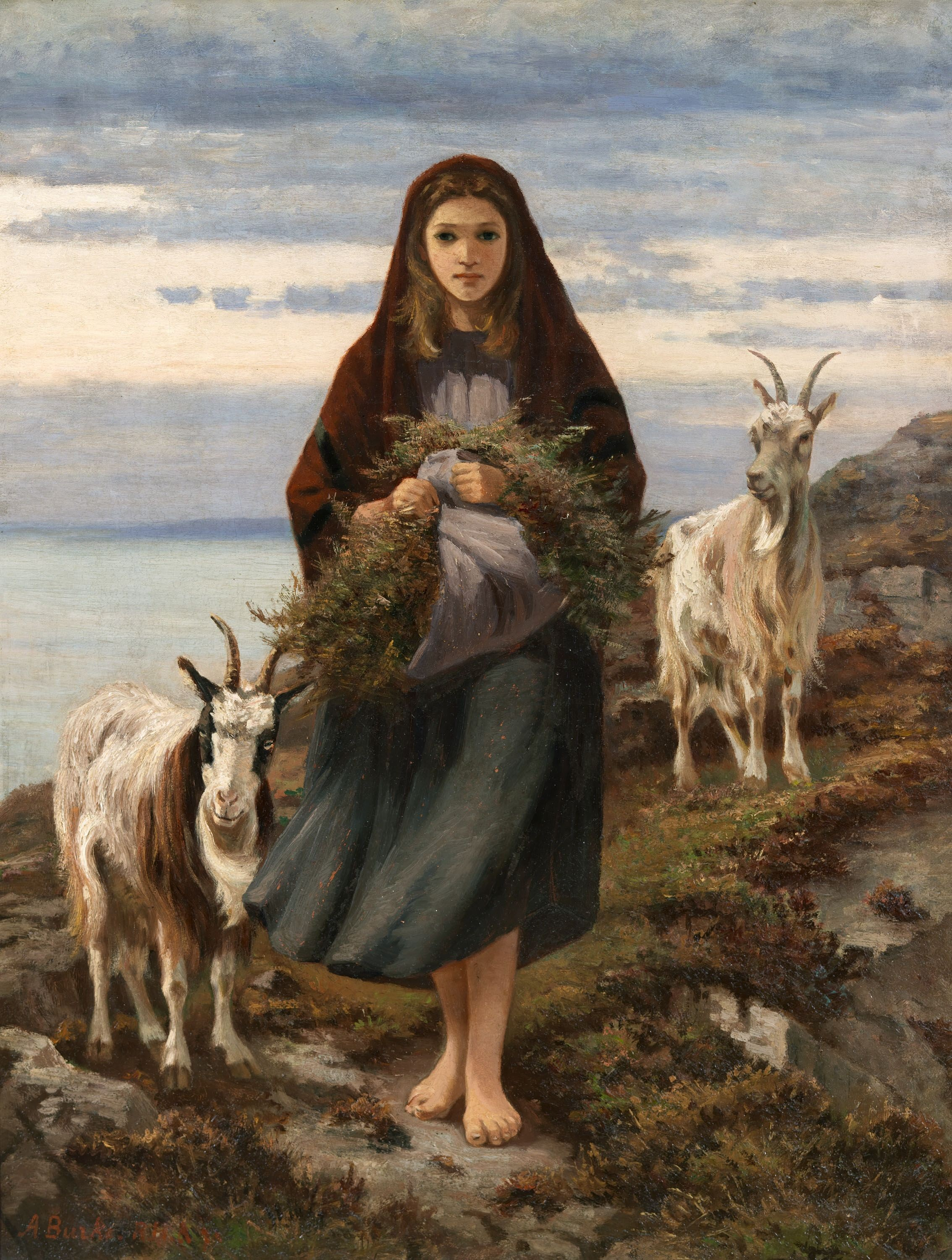
- Connemara Girl by Augustus J. N. Burke (National Gallery of Ireland)
- Born: Augustus Joseph Nicholas Burke; July 28, 1838; Glinsk, County Galway
- Died: 1891 (aged 52–53); Italy
- Education: Royal Academy of Arts, London
- Known for: Landscapes; Portraits
- Awards: Academician Royal Hibernian Academy

Augustus Joseph Nicholas Burke (28 July 1838 – 1891) was an Irish artist and an Academician of the Royal Hibernian Academy (RHA).

== Early life ==
Burke was born into the Galway Burkes of Glinsk and was the sixth son of William Burke of Knocknagur, Tuam, County Galway. He was born at Waterslade House in the town. One of his brothers was Theobald Hubert Burke, 13th Baronet of Glinsk, while another brother was Thomas Henry Burke, Permanent Under Secretary at the Irish Office.

== Career ==
He showed an early interest in drawing, displaying a love for depicting the people and land of Connemara. His career in the arts was initiated at the Royal Academy in London. He would exhibit at the Royal Academy and the Royal Hibernian Academy, from 1863 until his death, where he was also Professor of Painting. From 1870 to 1872 he resided in the Netherlands where he illustrated a handful of Dutch scenes. One of the earliest Irish artists to travel to Brittany, Burke exhibited fifteen Breton scenes at the Royal Hibernian Academy between 1876 and 1878. He painted further in his native Ireland, as well as Scotland and England. The 1880s brought Burke to Walberswick in Suffolk to an artist's colony created by Philip Wilson Steer. A student of Burke, Walter Osborne, painted with him here.

== Later life ==
Augustus, overcome with grief by his brother Thomas' murder during the Phoenix Park Murders in 1882, left his post at the Royal Hibernian Academy where he was Professor of Painting. He then moved with the remaining members of his family England and then later to Italy.

== Paintings ==
Two of his most famous paintings, Connemara Girl and A Connemara Landscape hang at the National Gallery of Ireland. His work is relatively rare, mainly because the contents of his studio were destroyed during the fire that engulfed the Abbey Street buildings of the RHA in 1916. Furthermore, many of the paintings lay hidden in a cellar for over ninety years until their recent discovery.

== Gallery ==
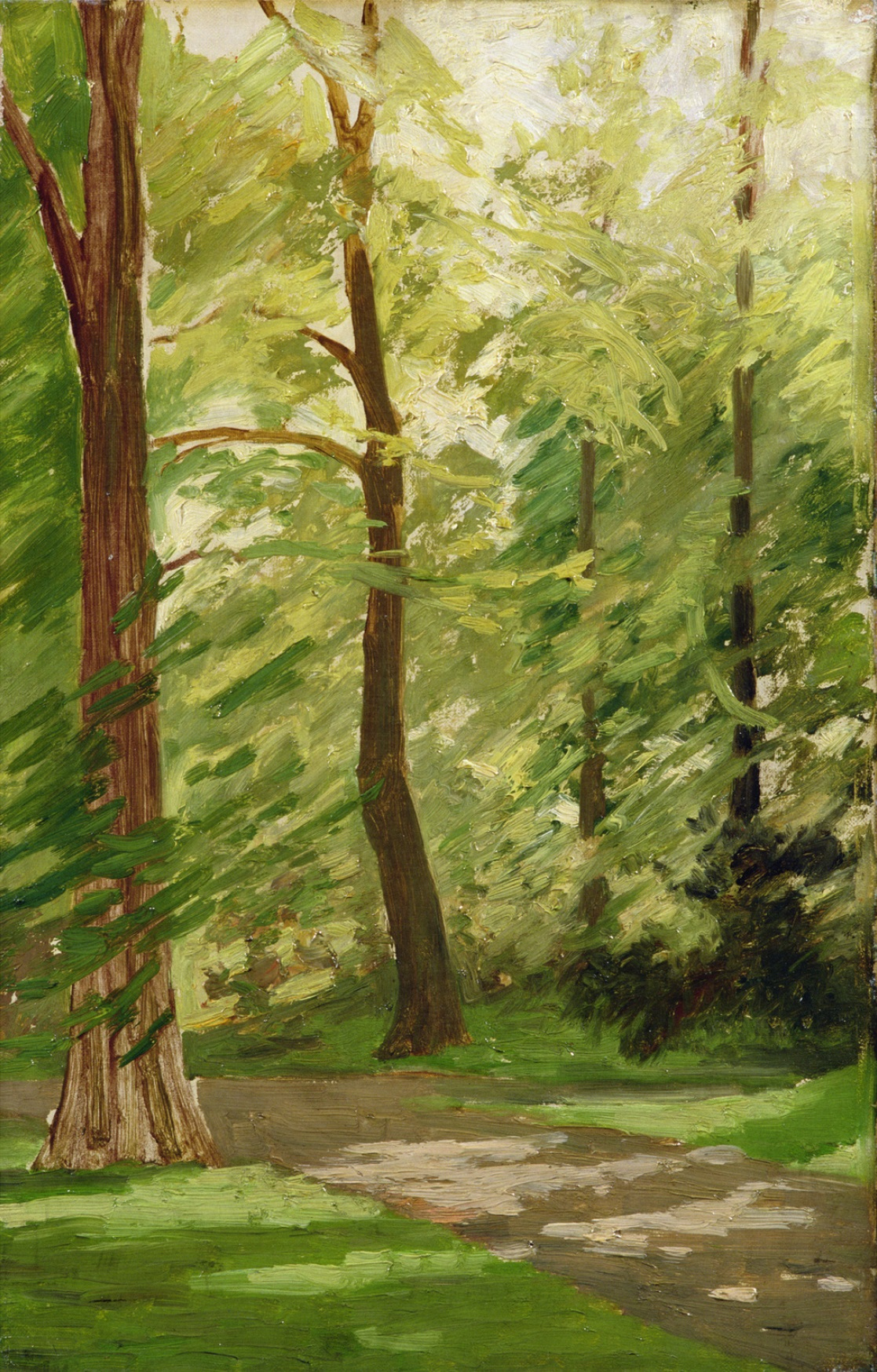
Study of Trees, Viceregal Lodge (1870), Dublin City Gallery

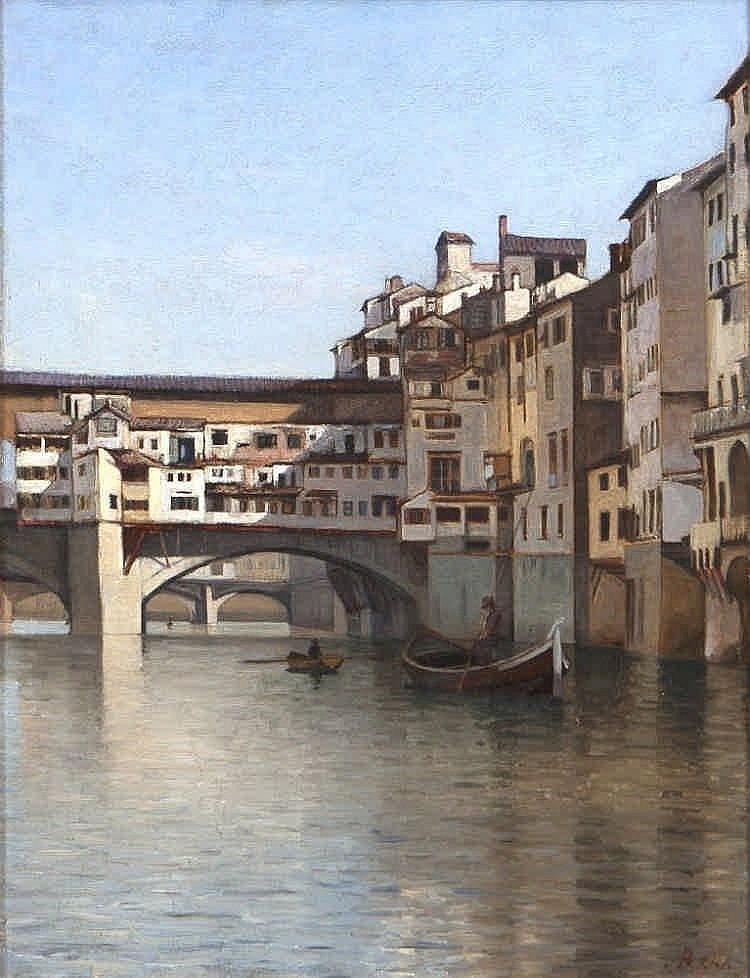
Ponte de Vecchio, Florence

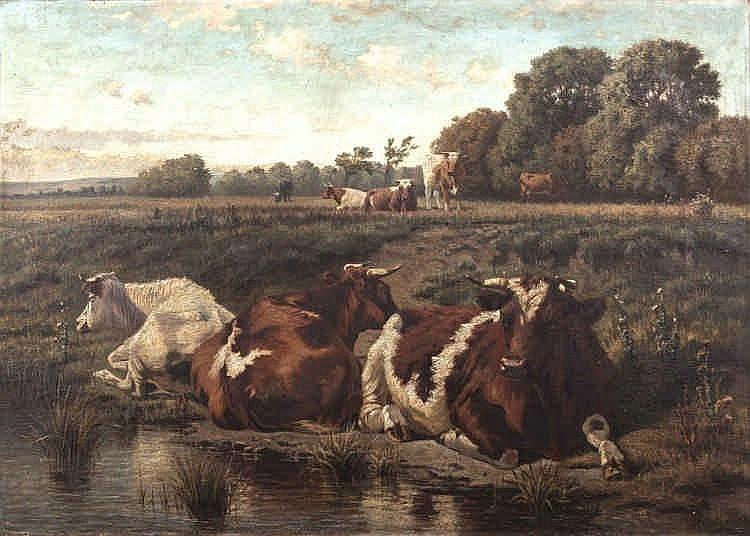
On the Banks of the Liffey, Kildare, August

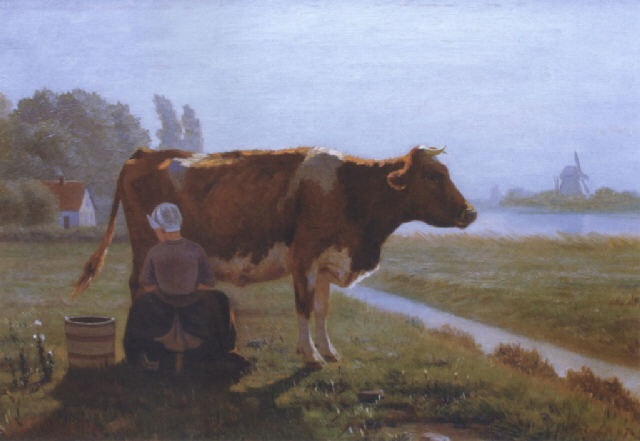
A misty morning, Holland (1874)

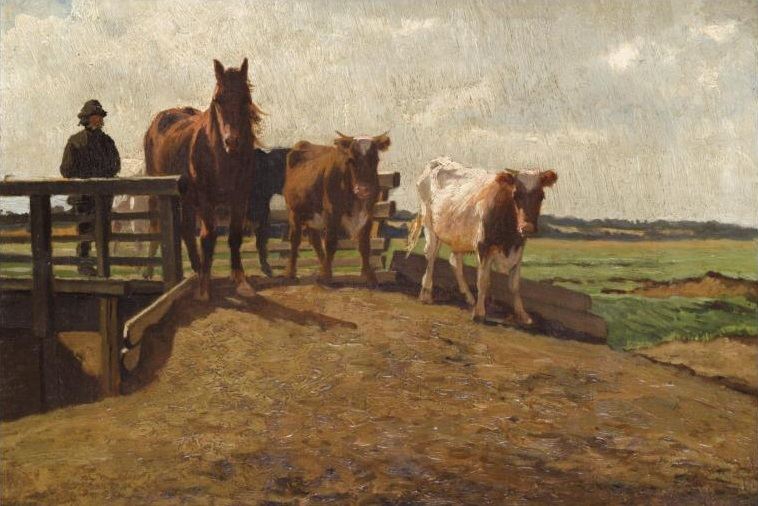
Crossing the bridge

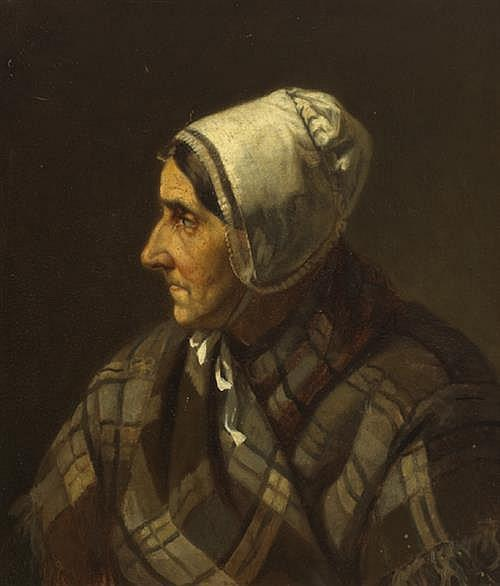
Head of old woman

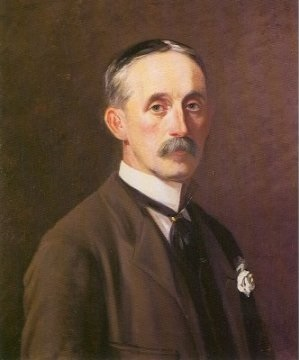
Portrait of Walter Frederick Osborne (1875)
