= A Connemara Girl =

Painting by Augustus Nicholas Burke

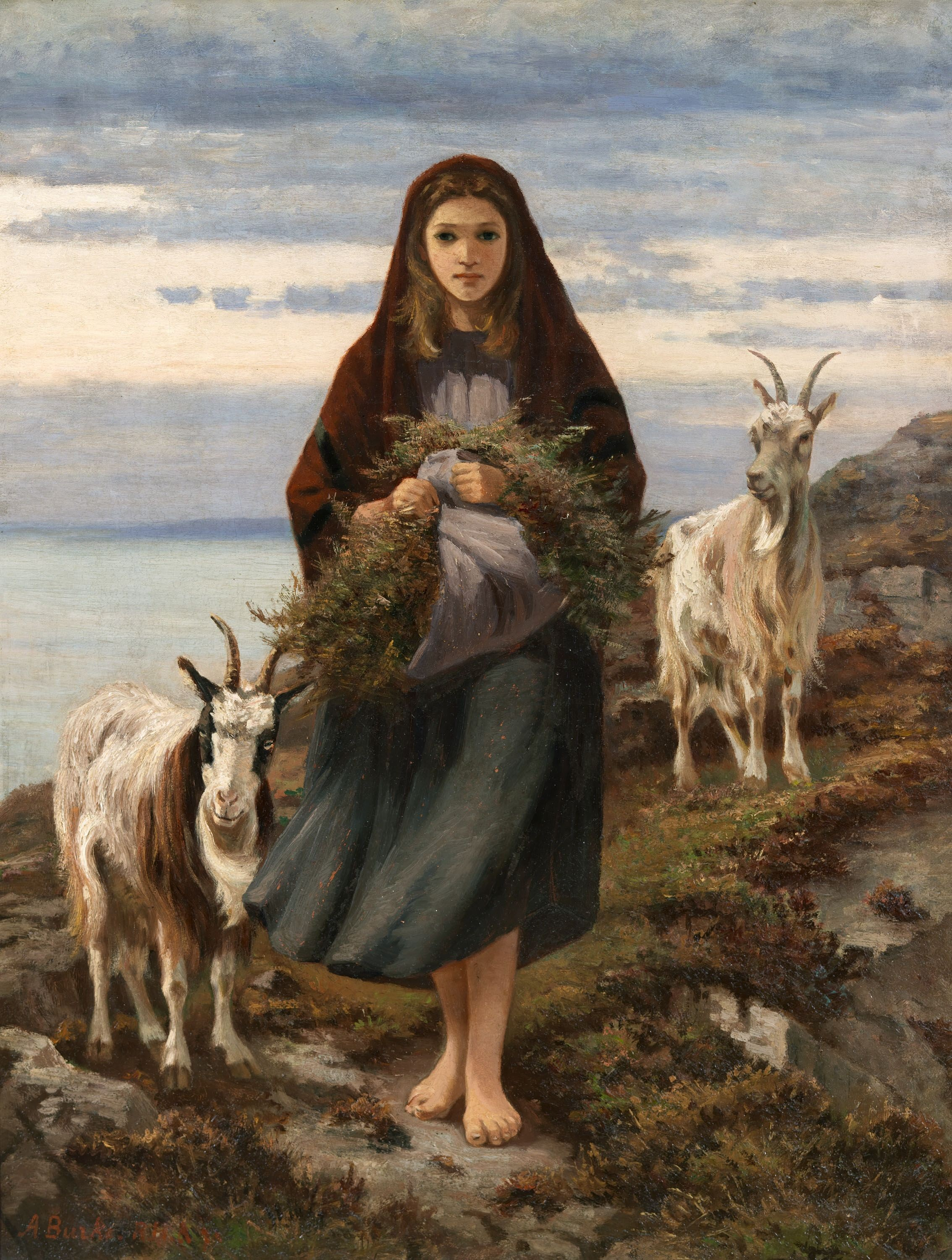
Connemara Girl (National Gallery of Ireland)

A Connemara Girl is an early 1870s painting by the Irish artist Augustus Nicholas Burke (July 28, 1838 – 1891). One of the most identifiable paintings in Ireland, it depicts a young girl in traditional Connemara attire carrying a bundle near the shore. It is one of many paintings Burke created of daily life around his native Connemara. It hangs in the National Gallery of Ireland and is one of the more popular paintings despite its simple subject matter. The painting is oil on canvas (63 x 48 cm) and was presented by Mrs Ida Monahan in 1951.

The National Gallery of Ireland label text is: "Showing a young woman in traditional Connemara attire, this painting might be said to evoke rather than illustrate Augustus Burke’s beloved west of Ireland. It was probably painted before the artist’s reluctant emigration, prompted by his brother’s murder alongside the Chief Secretary in the Phoenix Park in 1882. While the artist has relied on authentic detail, particularly in the girl’s costume and the terrain, he has made no attempt to disguise the contrived nature of the composition. The central position of the figure, her head and shoulders framed by a heavy shawl, calls to mind devotional Christian imagery."
