= Partible inheritance =

System dividing an estate between heirs

Partible inheritance, sometimes also called partitive, is a system of inheritance in which property is apportioned among heirs. It contrasts in particular with primogeniture, which was common in feudal society and requires that the whole or most of the inheritance passes to the eldest son, and with agnatic seniority, which requires the succession to pass to next senior male.

Partible inheritance systems are common ones to be found in legal systems based on both common law and the Napoleonic Code. In the latter case, there may be a further requirement implying division according to a scheme, such as equal shares for legitimate children.

Partible inheritance has been common in ancient Celtic and Germanic tribal societies, an example of the latter pattern is the so-called Salic patrimony. Historically speaking, non-partible inheritance has been associated with monarchies and the wish for landed estates to be kept together as units. In the Middle Ages, the partible inheritance systems, for example of the Merovingian dynasty, the Carolingian Empire, and the Kievan Rus, divided kingdoms into princely states, and are often thought to be responsible for their gradual decline in power.

Partible inheritance was the generally-accepted form of inheritance adopted in New England in the 18th century. The southern colonies adopted a system of male primogeniture in cases of intestacy, and the northern colonies adopted a system of partible inheritance in cases of intestacy, with the eldest son receiving a double portion of the estate. In practice, a strong bequest motive in the colonies adopting multigeniture reduced the variability in demographic experiences across colonies with different inheritance systems.

== See also ==
- Gavelkind
- Gavelkind in Ireland
