= Burke baronets =

Irish baronetcies

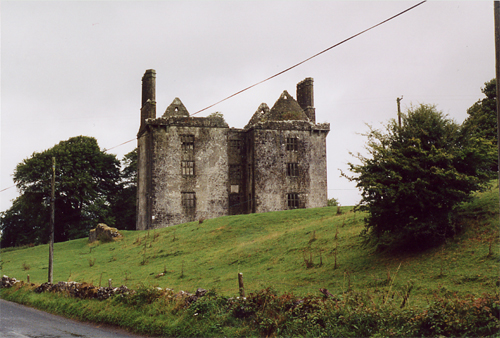
Glinsk Castle – the seat of the Burke Baronets of Glinsk

There have been two baronetcies created for persons with the surname Burke, both in the Baronetage of Ireland. As of 2014, one such creation still exists.

The Burke Baronetcy, of Glinsk in the County of Galway, was created in the Baronetage of Ireland on 2 August 1628 for Sir Ulick Burke, 1st Baronet (c.1594–c.1660). Sir Ulick Burke, 3rd Baronet, was a politician. This title became extinct upon the death of Sir Theobald Burke, 13th Baronet, in 1909. Two of his younger brothers gained distinction: Thomas Henry Burke was Permanent Under-Secretary at the Irish Office for many years before being assassinated in the 1882 Phoenix Park Murders; Augustus Nicholas Burke was a notable Anglo-Irish artist.

The family seat was Glinsk Castle, near Ballymoe, County Galway.

The Burke Baronetcy, of Marble Hill in the County of Galway, was created in the Baronetage of Ireland on 5 December 1797 for Thomas Burke. He raised an infantry regiment at his own expense during the Napoleonic Wars. The second and third Baronets both sat as Members of Parliament for County Galway. The fifth Baronet served as High Sheriff of County Galway in 1883. The seventh Baronet was a deputy lieutenant of County Galway. Three other members of the family may also be mentioned. Charles Granby Burke (1814–1898), second son of the second Baronet, was Master of the Court of Common Pleas (Ireland) from 1852 to 1882. James Henry Burke (1816–1882), third son of the second Baronet, was a major-general in the Bombay Engineers. His son James Henry Thomas Joseph FitzGerald Burke (1853–1902) was a captain in the Royal Navy.

The family seat was Marble Hill House, near Loughrea, County Galway.

== Burke baronets, of Glinsk (1628) ==
Burke of Glinsk Baronetcy Barúntacht de Búrca de Ghlinsce
- Arms of the Burke Baronets of Glinsk
- Creation date: 2 August 1628
- Baronetage: Baronetage of Ireland
- Status: Extinct
- Extinction date: 1909

- Sir Ulick Burke, 1st Baronet (c. 1594 – c. 1660)
- Sir Edmund Burke, 2nd Baronet (died c. 1686)
- Sir Ulick Burke, 3rd Baronet (died 1708)
- Sir John Burke, 4th Baronet (died c. 1724)
- Sir Festus Burke, 5th Baronet (died c. 1730)
- Sir Theobald Burke, 6th Baronet (died c. 1740)
- Sir Henry Burke, 7th Baronet (died 1748)
- Sir Ulick Burke, 8th Baronet (died 1759)
- Sir Henry John Burke, 9th Baronet (died 1814)
- Sir John Ignatius Burke, 10th Baronet (1784–1845)
- Sir Joseph Burke, 11th Baronet (1786–1865)
- Sir John Lionel Burke, 12th Baronet (1818–1884)
- Sir Theobald Hubert Burke, 13th Baronet (1833–1909)

== Burke baronets, of Marble Hill (1797) ==
Burke of Marble Hill Baronetcy Barúntacht de Búrca de Cnoc an Mharmair
- Arms of the Burke Baronets of Marble Hill
- Creation date: 5 December 1797
- Baronetage: Baronetage of Ireland
- Status: Extant

- Sir Thomas Burke, 1st Baronet (died 1813)
- Sir John Burke, 2nd Baronet (1782–1847)
- Sir Thomas John Burke, 3rd Baronet (1813–1875)
- Sir John Charles Burke, 4th Baronet (1858–1880)
- Sir Henry George Burke, 5th Baronet (1859–1910)
- Sir Thomas Malachy Burke, 6th Baronet (1864–1913)
- Sir Gerald Howe Burke, 7th Baronet (1893–1954)
- Sir Thomas Stanley Burke, 8th Baronet (1916–1989)
- Sir James Stanley Gilbert Burke, 9th Baronet (born 1956)

The heir apparent is the present holder's son Martin James Burke (born 1980).

== See also ==
- Nuala na Meadóige Ní Fionnachta
- House of Burgh, an Anglo-Norman and Hiberno-Norman dynasty founded in 1193
- Mac William Uachtar/Clanricarde, the Burke clan of Galway
- Earl of Clanricarde, earldom created in the Peerage of Ireland in 1543 and 1800
- Burke (surname), list of people with this surname
- Bourke (surname), list of people with this surname
