= 1706 in Ireland =

- Centuries: 16th; 17th; 18th; 19th; 20th
- Decades: 1680s; 1690s; 1700s; 1710s; 1720s
- See also: Other events of 1706; List of years in Ireland

Events from the year 1706 in Ireland.

== Incumbent ==
- Monarch: Anne

== Events ==
- November 21 – the Cox Baronetcy, of Dunmanway in the County of Cork, is created in the Baronetage of Ireland in favour of Richard Cox, Lord Chancellor of Ireland.
- Ulster Scots clergyman Francis Makemie organizes the first presbytery in British America.
- John O'Heyne's Epilogus chronologicus exponens (a history of the Dominican Order in Ireland) is published in Louvain.

== Arts and literature ==
- April 8 – George Farquhar's Restoration comedy The Recruiting Officer first performed at the Theatre Royal, Drury Lane, in London.

== Births ==
- John FitzGerald, politician and hereditary Knight of Kerry (d. 1741)
- approx. date – Matthew Deane, politician (d. 1751)

== Deaths ==
- April 10 – Arthur Chichester, 3rd Earl of Donegall, soldier (b. 1666) (killed in action)
- John Hayes, Member of Parliament for Doneraile
- Ambrose Aungier, 2nd and last Earl of Longford of the First Creation
