= 1702 in Ireland =

- Centuries: 16th; 17th; 18th; 19th; 20th
- Decades: 1680s; 1690s; 1700s; 1710s; 1720s
- See also: Other events of 1702; List of years in Ireland

Events from the year 1702 in Ireland.

== Incumbent ==
- Monarch: William III (until 8 March), then Anne

== Events ==
- 8 March – Anne becomes Queen of England, Scotland and Ireland upon the death of William III.

== Arts and literature ==
- October – Jonathan Swift returns to Ireland in the company of Esther Johnson.

== Births ==
- January – Thomas Arthur, comte de Lally, French general, born at Romans, Dauphin, the son of Sir Gerald Lally, an Irish Jacobite from Tuam, County Galway, who married a French noblewoman (d. 1766)

== Deaths ==
- 10 December – Michael Boyle (archbishop of Armagh) (Church of Ireland) (b. 1609?)
