= Glinsk Castle =

- Caisleán Ghlinsce (Irish)
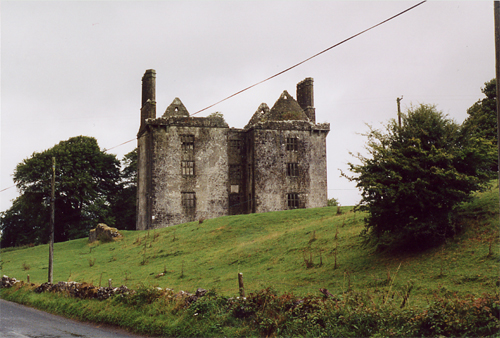

- Location within Ireland
- 53.652008°N 8.432011°W
- Type: Tower house
- Location: Glinsk, County Galway, Ireland

History
- Built: mid-17th century

National monument of Ireland
- Official name: Glinsk Castle
- Reference no.: 439

Glinsk Castle is a tower house and National Monument located in County Galway, Ireland.

== Location ==
Glinsk Castle is located in the centre of Glinsk village, halfway between Creggs and Ballymoe, in the valley of the River Suck.

== History ==
Glinsk Castle was built in the mid-17th century (begun c. 1628) and is reputed to be the last castle built in Ireland (obviously this depends on one's definition of "castle", for example Glenveagh Castle was constructed in 1870). It was the seat of the Burke baronets of Glinsk. It was gutted by fire, perhaps during the Cromwellian wars, leaving it well preserved. In 1829 Skeffington Gibbon described it as "a terrific roofless pile, haunted by a colony of rats."

== Castle ==
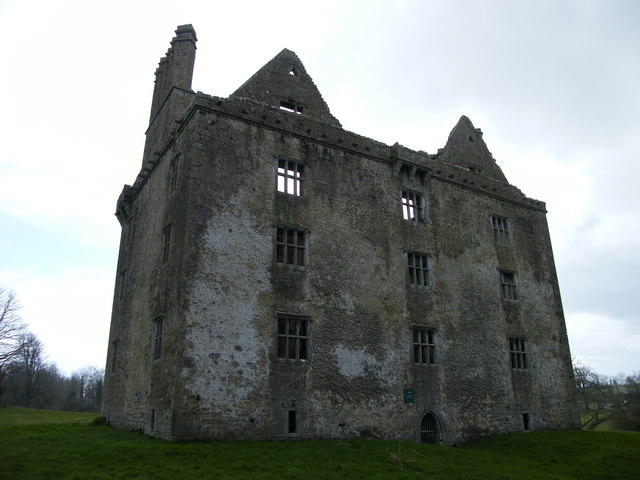
Another view of the castle

The castle stands on a limestone floor overlooking the countryside; famously, one can see all five counties of Connacht.

The castle is rectangular with two towers protruding to the south. It has two chimney shafts, each a battery of five diagonal stacks. The windows are mullioned with weepers. Defensive features included gun loops, bartizans and high basements. It was once surrounded by a bawn wall with turrets but little of that remains.
