= 1701 in Ireland =

- Centuries: 16th; 17th; 18th; 19th; 20th
- Decades: 1680s; 1690s; 1700s; 1710s; 1720s
- See also: Other events of 1701; List of years in Ireland

Events from the year 1701 in Ireland.

== Incumbent ==
- Monarch: William III

== Events ==
- March 14 – all illegal cargoes of grain brought from Ireland to the west of Scotland are ordered to be sunk.
- June 24 – the Act of Settlement 1701, passed by the Parliament of England, becomes law. Sophia of Hanover and her Protestant descendants are next in line to the throne following Anne, the heir apparent to her brother-in-law King William III, ensuring that no Catholic will inherit the throne.
- July 1 – an equestrian statue of King William III by Grinling Gibbons is unveiled by Dublin Corporation on College Green on the 11th anniversary of the Battle of the Boyne.
- September 18 – Laurence Hyde, 1st Earl of Rochester, sworn as Lord Lieutenant of Ireland (appointed 1700).

== Arts and literature ==
- Marsh's Library in Dublin is established by Narcissus Marsh (Archbishop of Dublin (Church of Ireland)) as the first public library in Ireland (architect: Sir William Robinson) with refugee French Huguenot scholar Élie Bouhéreau as its first librarian.
- Upper gallery of the Smock Alley Theatre in Dublin collapses for the second time.

== Births ==
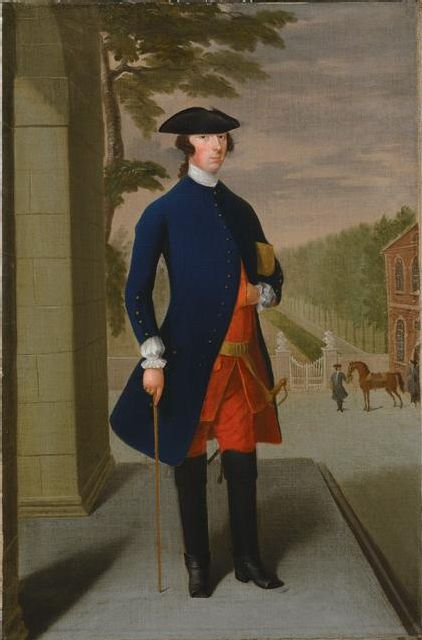
Joseph Leeson

- March 11 – Mark Kenton Sr., frontiersman, father of Simon Kenton (died near the Monongahela River in the United States 1783)
- March 11 – Joseph Leeson, 1st Earl of Milltown (d. 1783)
- Unknown
  - Matthew Concanen, wit, poet, playwright and lawyer (d. 1749)
  - Matthew Pilkington, art historian and satirist (died 1774)

== Deaths ==
- June – Charles Hamilton, 5th Earl of Abercorn, peer.
