= 1716 in Ireland =

- Centuries: 16th; 17th; 18th; 19th; 20th
- Decades: 1690s; 1700s; 1710s; 1720s; 1730s
- See also: Other events of 1716; List of years in Ireland

Events from the year 1716 in Ireland.

== Incumbent ==
- Monarch: George I

== Events ==
- June 20 – acts of the Parliament of Ireland for:
  - Confiscating the estates of James Butler, 2nd Duke of Ormonde and vesting them in the Crown, and abolishing the county palatine of Tipperary.
  - Drainage and navigation of the River Shannon.
- The titles Viscount Molesworth and Baron Philipstown, of Swords in the County of Dublin, are created in the Peerage of Ireland for Robert Molesworth.

== Arts and literature ==
- November 12 – Johann Sigismund Kusser (Cousser) is appointed "Master of the Music, attending His Majesties State in Ireland".
- Sarah Butler's Irish Tales is published in London.

== Births ==
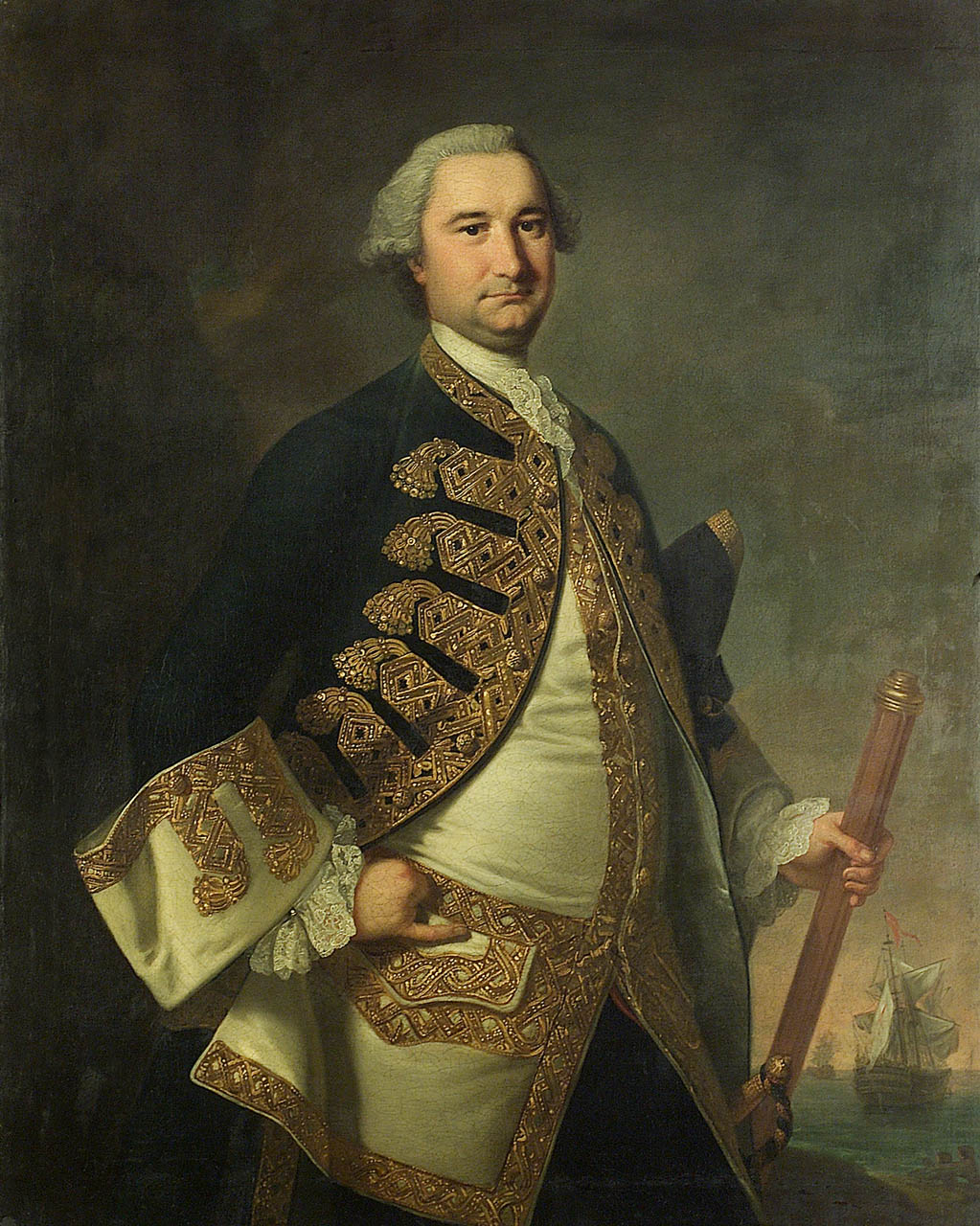
Richard Tyrrell

- November 1 – Tichborne Aston, politician (d. 1748)
- William Fisher, politician in Nova Scotia (d. 1777)
- Charles Tottenham, politician (d. 1795)
- Approximate date
  - James Daly, politician (d. 1769)
  - Richard Tyrell, naval officer (d. 1766)

== Deaths ==
- August 6 – Paul Davys, 1st Viscount Mount Cashell, nobleman (b. c. 1670)
- October 17 – Henry Folliott, 3rd Baron Folliott, nobleman, landowner and politician.
- Patrick Donnelly, Roman Catholic Bishop of Dromore and poet (b. 1650)
- Garret Morphey, painter (b. c. 1650)
- 1716 or 1718 – Ruaidhrí Ó Flaithbheartaigh, historian (b. 1629)
