= 1699 in Ireland =

- Centuries: 15th; 16th; 17th; 18th; 19th
- Decades: 1670s; 1680s; 1690s; 1700s; 1710s
- See also: Other events of 1699; List of years in Ireland

Events from the year 1699 in Ireland.

== Incumbent ==
- Monarch: William III

== Events ==
- January 26–June 14 – the Parliament of Ireland meets and enacts legislation to levy duties on exported woolens; to encourage the construction of parsonages; to oblige landowners to plant and conserve trees; and to prevent Roman Catholics from becoming solicitors.
- February 1 – the Parliament of England requires the disbandment of foreign troops in Ireland.
- May 4 – the Parliament of England enacts legislation providing for the appointment of a commission of inquiry into the administration of forfeited estates in Ireland.
- A Roman Catholic English language New Testament is probably printed in Dublin at about this date, but all copies appear to have been suppressed.

== Arts and literature ==
- c. July–August – the Welsh scholar Edward Lhuyd first travels in Ireland.
- Publication of The Dublin Scuffle: being a challenge sent by John Dunton, citizen of London, to Patrick Campbel, bookseller in Dublin.

== Births ==
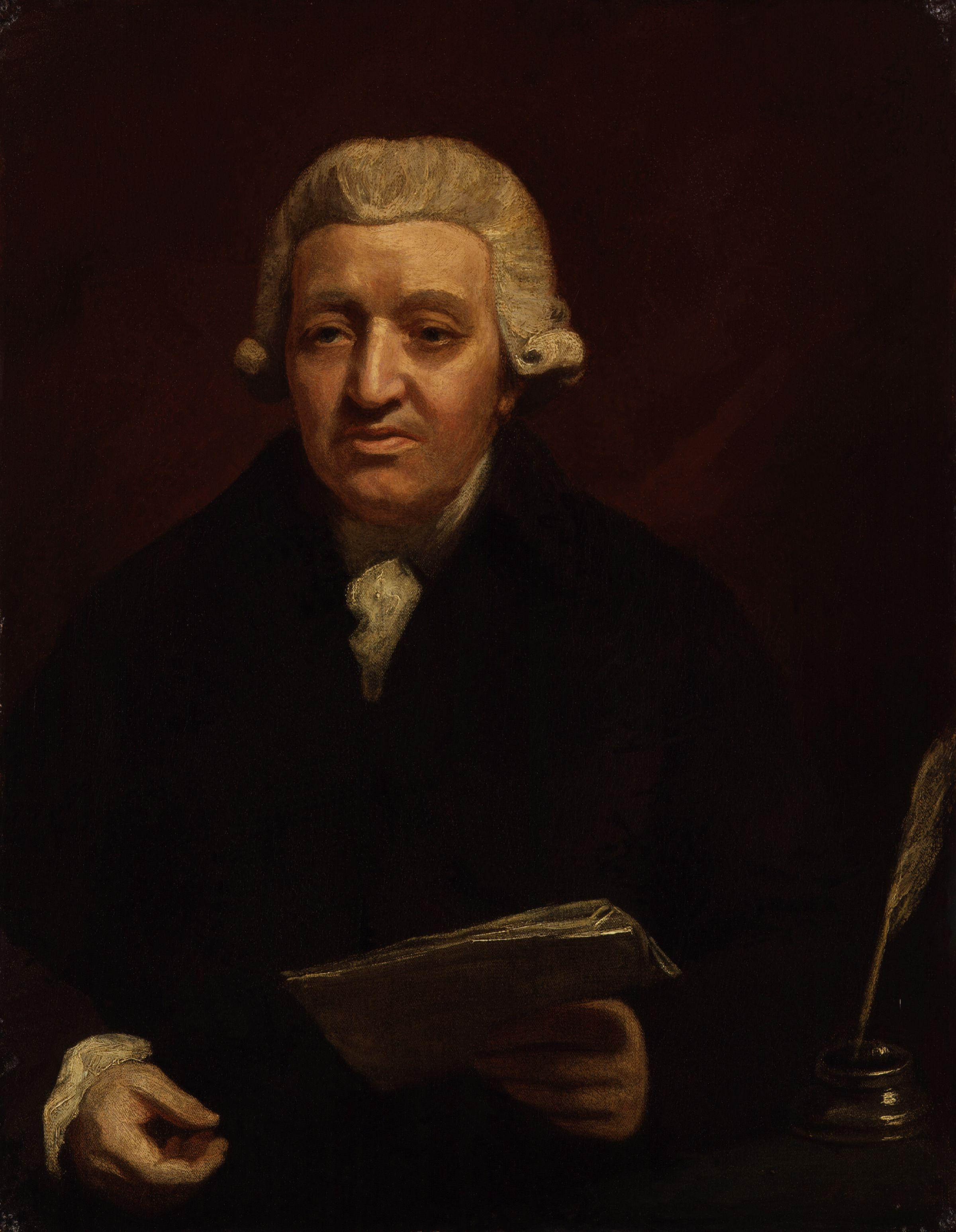
Charles Macklin by John Opie

- September 26 – Charles Macklin, actor and dramatist (d. 1797)
- Sir Richard Butler, 5th Baronet, politician (d. 1771)
- Edward Lovett Pearce, architect (d. 1733)
- Isaac Wayne, tanner (d. 1774 in the Province of Pennsylvania)

== Deaths ==
- April 6 – Sir Richard Nagle, lawyer and politician (b. 1636)
- June 18 – Popham Seymour-Conway, landowner (b. 1675) (result of a drunken duel)
- Michael Hill, politician (b. 1672)
- Dudley Persse, landowner (b. 1625)
