= 1710 in Ireland =

- Centuries: 16th; 17th; 18th; 19th; 20th
- Decades: 1690s; 1700s; 1710s; 1720s; 1730s
- See also: Other events of 1710; List of years in Ireland

The following is a list of events which took place in Ireland in 1710.

== Incumbent ==
- Monarch: Anne

== Events ==
- John Smithwick begins brewing Smithwick's ale at Kilkenny.

== Births ==
- William Annesley, 1st Viscount Glerawly, politician (d. 1770)

== Deaths ==
- April 7 – Sir Richard Bulkeley, 2nd Baronet, politician (b. 1660)
- August 28 – Thomas Bligh, politician (b. 1654)
- Richard Freeman, judge (b. 1646)
