= James Arbuckle =

- Born: 1700
- Died: 1742 (aged 41–42); Dublin, Ireland
- Education: University of Glasgow
- Writing career
- Genre: Poetry

James Arbuckle (1700 – 1742?) was an Irish poet and critic, associated politically with Presbyterianism and Whiggism.

His birthplace was possibly Belfast, but he was the son of a Presbyterian minister in Dublin, and educated at Glasgow University, where his studies were disrupted by his struggles against Calvinist authorities (concerning the right of students to cast votes for the university's rectorship). He espoused the philosophy of Anthony Ashley-Cooper, 3rd Earl of Shaftesbury. His first published work was Snuff (1717), a mock-epic, which won praise from Allan Ramsay. It was followed by Glotta, or, the Clyde (1721), a tribute to Scottish life and scenery in which the most ordinary topics (such as golf and swimming) are depicted in high-flown language. His style was similar to that of Alexander Pope, of whom he was clearly an admirer.

In 1723, Arbuckle returned to Dublin, where, under the patronage of Robert Molesworth, he edited the Weekly Journal, The Tribune and Hibernicus's Letters (a journal of essays later republished in two volumes, 1729). In 1735, he published a scathing satirical attack on Jonathan Swift, whom he had once befriended, entitled Momus Mistaken with which he inadvertently dented his own reputation. He intended to publish translations of classical works but nothing came of these plans; he became a schoolmaster in northern Ireland and his later life is obscure.

His death has been given various dates between 1734 and 1747. Some classical translations and other manuscript poetry are now in the National Library of Wales.

== Bibliography ==
- John F. Woznak. "James Arbuckle and the Dublin Weekly Journal." Journal of Irish Literature, v.22 (May 1993) pp46–52
- A.T.Q. Stewart. A Deeper Silence: The Hidden Origins of the United Irishmen. Blackstaff Press, 1998.
