= Francis Lucas (Royal Navy officer) =

- Born: 1741
- Died: 1770 (aged 28–29)
- Allegiance: United Kingdom
- Branch: Royal Navy

Francis Lucas (c. 1741 – 1770) naval officer and merchant trader born Clontibret, Ireland and died while at sea. He had helped establish trading relationships between Labrador and England that went on the secure the English fishery along that coast.

Lucas served on a naval ship in charge of monitoring the fisheries along the Labrador coast from 1764 to 1766 when in 1765 he had accompanied two Moravian missionaries Jens Haven and Christian Drachart in search of the Inuit of Labrador. These missionaries had established contact with Mikak and her family.

In 1767 Lucas became second in command of Fort York at Chateau Bay. Lucas and a group of his men had killed at least 20 Inuit for plundering a nearby fishing station. He had taken a number of them prisoner, along which was Mikak.

In 1770 Lucas left the navy and established a business partnership with Thomas Handasyd Perkins and Jeremiah Coghlan, merchants of Bristol, England, and Fogo, Newfoundland, and George Cartwright to trade with the Inuit of Labrador. He had tried in vain to make contact with Mikak but was unsuccessful. Lucas then left for Fogo where he set out for Portugal with a cargo of dry fish aboard the Enterprize which foundered at sea.

== See also ==
- List of people from Newfoundland and Labrador
- List of communities in Newfoundland and Labrador
