= Terra Salica =

Terra Salica was a type of land property invented by the Salian Franks. The Merovingians had two types of land property: de alode and terra Salica; the former could be inherited by both sexes, while the latter was restricted to men. The Frankish kings tended to grant terra Salica in exchange for servitude, and thus it was expected that it could only be inherited by someone who could continue providing the same service. King Chilperic showcased interest in allowing women to inherit family land next to their male siblings, and added that women should inherit in the absence of men.

== See also ==
- Germanic law
- Germanic kingship
