= Glinsk, County Galway =

Village in County , roscommon Ireland

Coordinates: 53°22′25″N 9°49′11″W

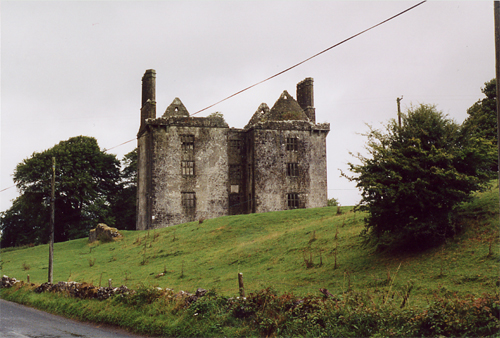
Glinsk Castle

Glinsk (Irish: Gleann Uisce, meaning 'glen of the water') is a small village in County Galway, Ireland, between Creggs and Ballymoe. Glinsk is located approximately 68 km from Galway city and approximately 30 km from Roscommon. It is located in valley of the River Suck, which has a 60-mile hiking trail. Nearby is the Glinsk Castle ruin, built by Ulick Burke in the early 17th century. Also in the area is the ruins of Ballynakill Abbey, which dates from the early 13th century. See Burke Baronets.

The services found in Glinsk include a church, a shop, a pub and a GAA pitch. The community centre also houses a childcare centre which opened in 2009. The church is called St. Michael's Church and is situated beside the local primary school, Glinsk National School.

== See also ==
- List of towns and villages in Ireland
