= Gavelkind =

System of Celtic land tenure

Gavelkind (/ˈɡævəlkaɪnd/) was a system of land tenure chiefly associated with the Celtic law in Ireland and Wales and with the legal traditions of the English county of Kent.

Kent's inheritance pattern was a system of partible inheritance and bears a resemblance to Salic patrimony. As such, it may bear witness to a wider Germanic tradition that was probably ancient. Over the centuries, various acts were passed to disgavel individual manors, but the custom was only fully abolished in England and Wales by the Administration of Estates Act 1925.

== Etymology ==
According to the Oxford English Dictionary, the word is a compound of gafol (meaning a "payment") and gecynd (meaning "species" or "kind"). Its earliest known use is in 1206 (the Middle English period) in the Charter Rolls. William Somner in A Treatise on Gavelkind said gafol was an Old English term, claiming it had been in use before the Norman Conquest, and was used in various compound forms to mean a tribute, tax, custom and sometimes a rent such as gavel-corn.

Another theory is that the word may have originated from the Old Irish phrases Gabhaltas-cinne or Gavail-kinne, which meant "family settlement" (Modern Irish gabháil chine).

The term came to describe all tenure and inheritance practices where land was divided equally among sons or other heirs.

== Gavelkind in Kent ==
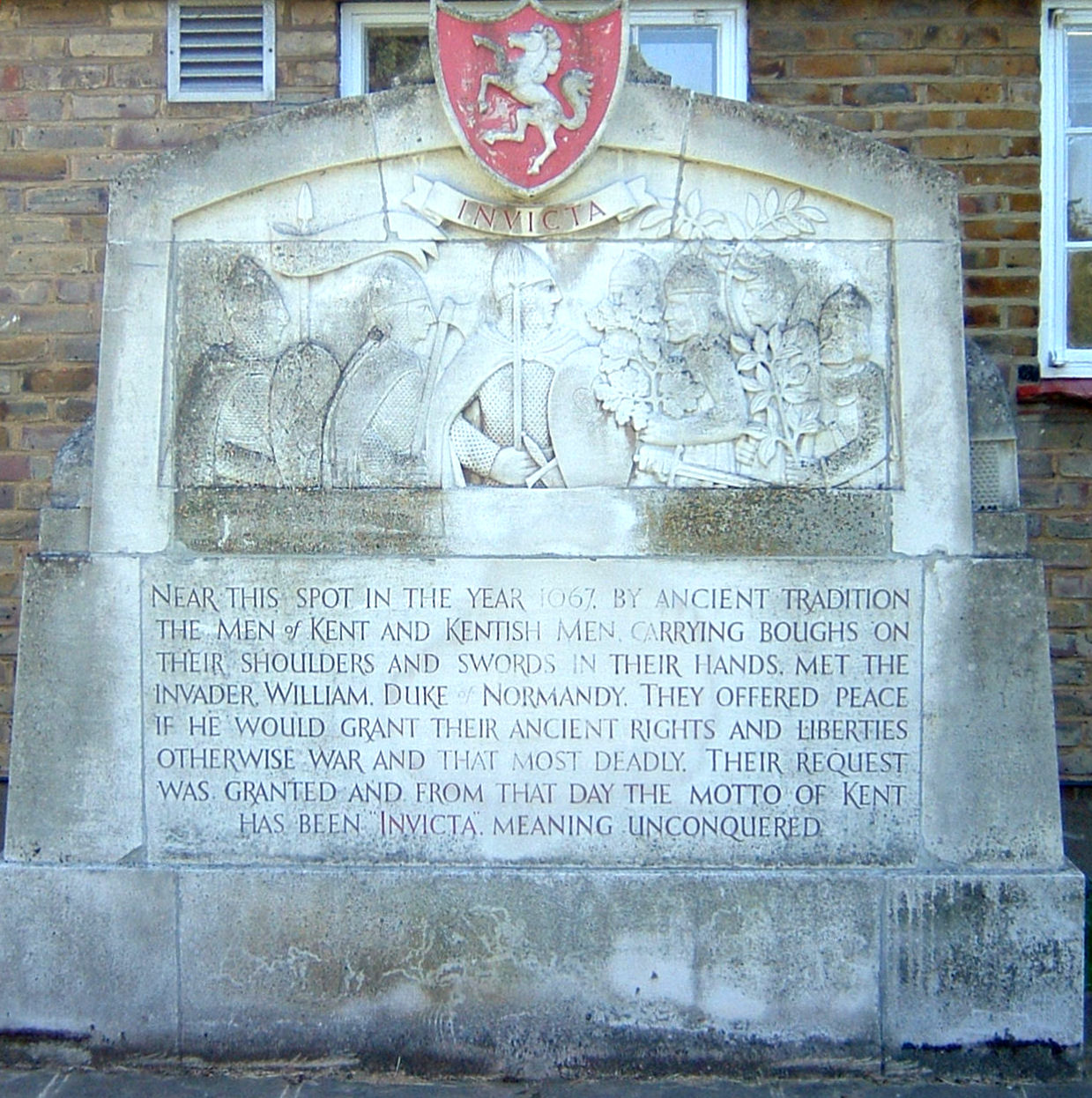
Monument at Swanscombe commemorating the legend of how Kent successfully managed to protect their rights from subjugation by the Duke of Normandy

Before the abolition of gavelkind tenure by the Administration of Estates Act 1925, all land in Kent was presumed to be held by gavelkind until the contrary was proved. It was more correctly described as socage tenure, subject to the custom of gavelkind. The chief peculiarities of the custom were the following:

- A tenant could pass on part or all of his lands as a fiefdom from the age of 15.
- On conviction for a felony, the lands were not subject to corruption of blood.
- The tenant could generally dispose of his lands in his will.
- In case of intestacy, the estate was passed on to all sons or their representatives in equal shares, with all sons being left equally a gentleman. Although daughter claiming in their own right were given a second preference, they could still inherit through representation.
- A dowager was entitled to half of the land.
- A widow who had no children was entitled to inherit half of the estate as a tenant as long as she remained unmarried.

Gavelkind, an example of customary law in England, was thought to have existed before the Norman Conquest of 1066, but was generally superseded by the feudal law of primogeniture introduced by the Normans. Its survival in Kent has been popularly attributed to favorable terms negotiated between the people of the county and William the Conqueror, who was unable to subdue them, although this suggestion has been debated by scholars.

== Gavelkind in Wales ==
In medieval Wales, a legal framework had developed based on the ancient Celtic laws and traditions similar to those in Ireland. These included a custom of gavelkind inheritance known as cyfran.

Cyfran was an ancient tradition passed down orally by jurists and bards until the mid-10th century, when the laws were codified during the reign of Hywel Dda. The Cyfraith Hywel would become the most well-known and widely-adopted Welsh legal structure, and many of the laws were concerned with inheritance. The concept of cyfran stated that on a landowner's death, his land would be divided equally among all of the sons, including those who were illegitimate.

The continual division of lands and titles with each successive generation has been seen by some historians as detrimental to the success and stability of Welsh princes and lords, especially compared to the system of primogeniture practised in Norman England and by the Marcher Lords, whose entire patrimony was often passed on directly to the eldest son. The Welsh historian Philip Yorke, writing in 1799, summarised the situation:

Our laws of gavelkind, had ill effect, applied to the succession as the freedom of the State; it balanced the power and raised the competition of the younger branches against the elder; a Theban war of Welsh brethren ending in family blood, and national destruction.

— Philip Yorke, The Royal Tribes of Wales, p. 46

The Laws in Wales Acts 1535–1542 saw the Welsh legal system being replaced with English law, and the laws associated with gavelkind were replaced with those of primogeniture. However, as in England, the custom of gavelkind was not finally abolished until the Administration of Estates Act 1925.

== Gavelkind in Ireland ==
In Ireland, gavelkind was a species of tribal succession by which the land, instead of being divided at the death of the holder amongst his sons, was thrown again into the common stock and redivided among the surviving members of the sept.

Under Traditional Irish law, land was divided at the death of the holder among his sons. The Normans called the Irish inheritance law gavelkind because of its apparent similarity to Jutish gavelkind inheritance in Kent.

== See also ==
- History of English land law
- Invicta (motto)
